= Betty Clawman =

Fictional superhero in DC Comics

- Drawn by Joe Staton in Millennium #2.

Publication information
- Publisher: DC Comics
- First appearance: Millennium #2 (January 1988)
- Created by: Steve Englehart (writer); Joe Staton (artist)

In-story information
- Alter ego: Betty Clawman
- Species: Homo magi
- Place of origin: Earth
- Team affiliations: New Guardians
- Abilities: Cosmic awareness

Betty Clawman is a fictional superhero and disembodied cosmic force in the DC Comics shared universe. She first appeared in Millennium #2 (January 1988), and was created by Steve Englehart and Joe Staton.

The Millennium series was specifically written to introduce superheroes of color into the DC universe. Betty Clawman is an Aboriginal Australian woman, and her teammates include Gloss (a.k.a. Xiang Po, from mainland China), Jet (a.k.a. Celia Windward, an Afro-Caribbean British citizen), Extraño (a.k.a. Gregorio de la Vega, from Peru) and Inuit mechanic Thomas Kalmaku.

== Fictional character biography ==
Betty Clawman was a young Aboriginal Australian girl from Uluru, who was selected by the Guardians of the Universe to take part in an experiment in human evolution, and to advance the human race. Clawman, along with the other nine "chosen", are taught about the nature of the cosmos and endowed with immortality and metahuman abilities. Clawman was given the power to enter and merge with the Dreamtime, gaining vast and ill-defined abilities. Together with Harbinger, seven of the chosen form the superhero team New Guardians.

Betty Clawman and the New Guardians appear in Teen Titans Spotlight #19.

Following the end of the New Guardians series, Betty Clawman largely fell into obscurity. In the series Doomsday Clock, Clawman assumes the alias Dreamer and joins the Sleeping Soldiers, a group of Australian metahumans founded as part of an international arms race.

== Powers and abilities ==
Betty's abilities since entering Dreamtime are vast and unspecified. She appears to have a degree of cosmic awareness, as befitting an Earth Mother figure, and has some ability to influence dreams. On one occasion she "synced" with Tom Kalmaku and amplified his abilities to unleash the genetic potential of several human clones.

== Reception ==
Writer and scholar Frederick Luis Aldama described Betty Clawman as one of several superheroes of color that began to emerge in comic books in the 1980s and 1990s, and he described her character as "interestingly fleshed out". Luke Pearson of the Special Broadcasting Service noted Clawman is one of several Aboriginal characters in comic books who was not originally written or drawn by Aboriginal authors or artists, but said she is among a handful of recent characters created with more care for Aboriginal origins and characteristics, expressing hope that this would lead to future characters written and drawn by Aboriginals themselves. Tyson Yunkaporta according to an article in The Guardian, said that Clawman made an impression when first launched, but was among a handful of Aboriginal characters who were eventually "neutralised, reconciled with the main protagonists and retired to obscurity". Tim Richards of The Sydney Morning Herald called Clawman "the most obscure of the big comic book companies' Aboriginal heroes". Pop culture writer Valerie Estelle Frankel noted that Clawman is part of a trend of female characters having telepathy, mind control, or telekinesis, which Frankel said is presented in comic books as a "specifically feminine power".

History professor Allan Austing and English professor Patrick Hamilton, both of Misericordia University, were critical of the portrayal of Betty Clawman and other members of the New Guardians, who they described as racial stereotypes rather than actual characters. Austin said he was "horrified" by the depiction, and said while the characters were an attempt to promote multiculturalism and the benefits of a more inclusive society, the way the characters were executed risked having the opposite effect. Clawman and others from the New Guardians were made part of a course the two taught at Misericorida called "Race and Graphic Narrative in Post-War United States".
