= Extraño =

- Extraño (right) as depicted in DC Pride #1 (August 2021). Art by Stephen Byrne.

Publication information
- Publisher: DC Comics
- First appearance: Millennium #2 (January 1988)
- Created by: Steve Englehart (writer); Joe Staton (artist)

In-story information
- Alter ego: Gregorio de la Vega
- Species: Homo magi (current); Human (formerly)
- Place of origin: Earth
- Team affiliations: New Guardians; Justice Foundation; Justice League Queer; Lords of Order; Justice League
- Partnerships: Tasmanian Devil (love interest/husband); Sylvan Ortega (apprentice)
- Supporting character of: Midnighter
- Notable aliases: Count Control
- Abilities: Expert magic user & extensive knowledge of the supernatural

Extraño is a superhero magician appearing in American comic books published by DC Comics. Created by writer Steve Englehart and artist Joe Staton, he first appeared in Millennium #2 (January 1988). Extraño is noted for being the first openly gay superhero in DC Comics.

Originally a minor supporting character affiliated with the Green Lantern mythos, the character in recent stories is instead cast as a powerful sorcerer in the DC Universe, serving as the magical ally of Midnighter who is both leader and founder of Justice League Queer, a loose network for LGBTQ superheroes who can call on each other for superheroic and personal support.

== Publication history ==
Extraño first appeared in Millennium #2, created by Steve Englehart and artist Joe Staton as an openly gay character. While the character originally never said the word "gay" in the comic, one writer states: "Extraño embodied nearly every stereotype of a gay man. He was flamboyant and colorful, and he referred to himself in the third person, as 'Auntie'. Extraño was mainly used as comic relief, and he never had a boyfriend". The character was controversial, both internally at DC Comics as well as with the readership; Englehart wanted to explore the character more, including a storyline about HIV, but Englehart later said that the editor, Andy Helfer, did not want gay characters in his comics, and "he thought that Extraño was 'cured' at the end of Millennium". Extraño was ultimately killed by HIV infection, but it was contracted from a fight with an "AIDS vampire" supervillain called the Hemo-Goblin.

The character was later revamped for the modern era in the post-DC Rebirth universe, as a supporting character in Midnighter and Apollo (2016–2017), a six-issue miniseries about two gay superheroes.

== Fictional character biography ==
During the 1988 Millennium storyline, Extraño was part of a group selected by the Guardians of the Universe to take part in an experiment in human evolution. Extraño was a Peruvian man, Gregorio De La Vega, from Trujillo City. As a minor magician, his magical powers were heightened by the procedure, and his fellow participants gained new abilities as well. Together, they formed the superhero team New Guardians, and they fought evil worldwide.

Extraño initially wears loose colorful garments and refers to himself as "Auntie", often imparting parental advice to his teammates. Serving as the team's resident magician, he could fire blasts of energy from his hands, levitate, and perform a large number of "stage tricks, including ping-pong 'balls' to outwit his foes. He had an earnest sense of justice and love of life that made him popular with his teammates. During The New Guardians' short run, Extraño acquired a crystal skull which seemed to greatly amplify his abilities and a more traditional, "masculine" superhero costume, perhaps as a reaction to the comments of readers.

In The New Guardians, Extraño helped his team defeat a number of supervillains while trying his best to assist teammates with their personal problems. On one mission in particular, he was attacked by an "AIDS vampire" Hemo-Goblin (a name using wordplay on the blood component hemoglobin). Extraño was subsequently confirmed to be HIV-positive, but it is unclear whether he was infected by Hemo-Goblin or had already been infected prior to his introduction. Though he showed no outward signs of the disease, his infection remained a somewhat unorthodox plot point. Although the Guardians continued to fight evildoers behind the scenes even after their comic ended, their island base was attacked and engulfed by Entropy in the series Green Lantern. For a time it was assumed Extraño died during this incident, but the subsequent reappearance of other New Guardians throws this into doubt.

=== DC Rebirth ===
The post-DC Rebirth incarnation of Extraño as depicted in Midnighter and Apollo #1 (December 2016), art by Fernando Blanco.

After the timeline-altering events of the 2016 DC Rebirth relaunch, Henry Bendix tries to recruit Extraño against Midnighter and Apollo, but Gregorio De La Vega now shuns his previous persona, and he refuses. Midnighter subsequently journeys to Gregorio's Lima, Peru home, The Sacrarium, that Gregorio shares with a man named Hugh and Suri, an adopted girl with wings. Gregorio agrees to help Midnighter, and locates Apollo's soul in Hell, where it was relegated after Apollo's encounter with Mawzir. Writer Steve Orlando, who is bisexual, explains his decision to reintroduce the character, "With a book like Midnighter & Apollo, which from cover to cover is a love letter to queer characters and our struggle to live, be visible and love, it felt right to return to one of the first and reintroduce Gregorio to a new generation".

Extraño next appears in DC Pride (2021), a special compilation celebrating Pride Month. In the story "By the Victors", also written by Steve Orlando, Extraño meets John Constantine in a bar and tells him the story of when he and Midnighter fought the homophobic vampire Count Berlin to save the canonical history of Achilles and Patroclus being lovers, which Berlin wanted to modify to make the Greek heroes straight. After leaving the bar, Constantine flirts with Extraño, who explains he is married. In the story "Love Life", by Andrew Wheeler, Extraño is summoned alongside a crew of heroes he refers to as the Justice League Queer (JLQ) to defend a Pride Parade from attack by Eclipso. Later, the heroes enjoy the festivities, and Extraño is seen kissing his husband, Tasmanian Devil.
