= Jet (DC Comics) =

- Jet as depicted in Millennium #8 (February 1988). Art by Joe Staton.

Publication information
- Publisher: DC Comics
- First appearance: Millennium #2 (January 1988)
- Created by: Steve Englehart (writer); Joe Staton (artist)

In-story information
- Alter ego: Celia Windward
- Species: Metahuman
- Place of origin: Earth
- Team affiliations: Global Guardians; New Guardians
- Abilities: Electromagnetic manipulation; Electromagnetic spectrum control; Flight

Jet is a fictional superhero published by DC Comics. She first appeared in Millennium #2 (January 1988) and was created by Steve Englehart and Joe Staton.

== Fictional character biography ==
The creators of the Green Lantern Corps, the Guardians of the Universe, had planned to create their successors, a race of new Guardians. The Guardians foresaw that their successors were destined to originate on the planet Earth, so they channeled their vast powers into the "Millennium Project", gathering ten individuals together, teaching them about the nature of the cosmos and endowing them with immortality and metahuman powers. One of these was Celia Windward, a young Jamaican woman living in Great Britain, to whom the Guardians gave the power to control electromagnetic energies. She became Jet, and joined the other heroes the Guardians had made in the team named the New Guardians. Jet fought many foes, but contracted HIV fighting the "Hemo-Goblin". As her symptoms worsen into AIDS, Jet sacrifices herself to repel an alien invasion.

In "One Year Later", Jet appears alive as the leader of the Global Guardians.

== Powers and abilities ==
Jet possesses the metahuman ability to manipulate electromagnetic energy. This enables her to generate heat and electricity, manipulate metal, see in ultraviolet and infrared vision, and fly via magnetic levitation.

== In other media ==
Celia Windward appears in Young Justice, voiced by Lauren Tom. This version is a member of Markovia's Infinity Cadets who gained her powers after being kidnapped and experimented on as part of a metahuman trafficking operation.
