= List of Doomsday Clock characters =

Some of the main characters of Doomsday Clock (from left to right): Mime, Marionette, Rorschach, Ozymandias with Bubastis, Comedian, Batman, Saturn Girl, Johnny Thunder, Green Lantern and Black Adam; Superman and Doctor Manhattan appear as mirror images.

Doomsday Clock is a superhero comic book limited series published by DC Comics, created by Geoff Johns, Gary Frank and Brad Anderson. As a direct sequel to the graphic novel Watchmen by Alan Moore, Dave Gibbons and John Higgins, this series concluded the plot established between The New 52 and DC Rebirth, featuring a massive roster of characters owned by DC Comics.

The following is a list of characters who have appeared.

== Watchmen universe ==
=== Crimebusters ===
The Crimebusters is a superhero group that succeeds the Minutemen. They disbanded following the passage of the Keene Act, which forbade non-government sanctioned superheroes.

Among its notable members are:

- Comedian / Edward Blake — A former member of the Minutemen and the Crimebusters whose death was prevented by Doctor Manhattan. (Note: Doomsday Clock #2 (December 2017)) He then began his revenge crusade against Ozymandias for attempting to kill him, as well as continuing on the trail of Mime and Marionette. (Note: Doomsday Clock #5 (May 2018)) Comedian catches up to Joker, Mime, and Marionette when they attend an underground villain meeting held by Riddler to discuss the Superman Theory. He makes himself known by shooting Typhoon in the face. While pursuing them, he evades Giganta's attacks, shoots Riddler in the leg, and uses a grenade to defeat the other villains present. When Mime and Marionette are in bed together the next morning, Comedian catches up to them, planning to use them to find Ozymandias. Before Comedian can do anything, Joker comes to Mime and Marionette's rescue and stuns Comedian with a joy buzzer. (Note: Doomsday Clock #6 (July 2018)) As Batman gets free and fights Joker, Mime and Marionette escape with Comedian and the Lantern Battery. (Note: Doomsday Clock #7 (September 2018)) After non-fatally shooting Oyzmandias, Comedian is returned to his spot in time. (Note: Doomsday Clock #12 (December 2019))
- Doctor Manhattan / Jonathan Osterman — A former member of the Crimebusters who remains skeptical of humanity's hope. He is suspected for altering the DC Universe following the Flashpoint event, and for making "experiments" in the lives of Superman and everyone else. Manhattan is confronted by most of Earth's heroes, but defeats them all. (Note: Doomsday Clock #8 (December 2018)) (Note: Doomsday Clock #9 (March 2019)) Before arriving on Earth to confront Superman, Manhattan spares the defeated heroes on Mars, but makes sure they do not interfere. (Note: Doomsday Clock #10 (May 2019)) After Superman stops Pozhar from attacking him, Manhattan meets with Superman, who convinces him to restore the timeline.
- Nite Owl / Daniel Dreiberg — Former member of the Crimebusters, who has a current relationship with Laurel Juspeczyk. They would conceive a daughter and adopt Mime and Marionette's son. (Note: Doomsday Clock #11 (August 2019)) Dan and Laurel adopt Mime and Marionette's son, who addressed himself as Clark.
- Ozymandias / Adrian Veidt — A former member of the Crimebusters who becomes a fugitive after the truth behind his alien monster's attack is exposed when Walter's journal was published. Having purportedly been diagnosed with terminal brain cancer, and knowing that his plan to save the world has failed, Veidt recruits Reggie Long as the new Rorschach and has him break Erika Manson and her husband Marcos Maez out of prison. When Rorschach returns with the two, Veidt reveals himself and his situation, explaining to the two criminals that they must follow Manhattan to another universe and convince him to save their world. (Note: Doomsday Clock #1 (November 2017)) Veidt is later confronted by Batman, who has read the contents of the original Rorschach's journal. As the two elude the police, Batman asserts that Veidt murdered millions as part of a delusional hero syndrome, and accuses him of concocting a conspiracy theory that negatively affected the public's trust in superheroes. Veidt in turn criticizes Batman for focusing all his attention on chasing supervillains while ignoring the world's social problems. A struggle ensues, leading to Batman falling out of the Owlship and into a mob of anti-hero protestors. Using his pet lynx Bubastis and Alan Scott's Green Lantern Power Battery, Veidt teleports Doctor Manhattan to the Joker's lair, where Batman is fighting Marionette and Mime. Manhattan reveals, among other things, that Veidt lied to Rorschach about having cancer in order to get his help. Rorschach punches Veidt and flees, while Veidt returns to the Owlship, attacks Imra and Johnny, and declares he can save everyone. After claiming that he arranged for Superman to convince Doctor Manhattan to save the world, Ozymandias is shot by Comedian. When returned to his world, Ozymandias is last seen standing trial.
- Rorschach / Walter Kovacs — Former member of the Crimebusters, who was killed by Doctor Manhattan seven years ago. His journal was published over time by Robert Redford and the New Frontiersman, exposing Ozymandias' role in the New York massacre.
- Silk Spectre / Laurel Juspeczyk — Former member of the Crimebusters and daughter of Edward Blake and Sally Jupiter. She would conceive a daughter with Nite Owl and adopt Mime and Marionette's son. She refused to join Ozymandias in his search to find Doctor Manhattan.

=== Minutemen ===
The Minutemen are a superhero group and the predecessor of the Crimebusters. The group was founded in 1939 during the Golden Age. The group later disbanded in 1949 following a series of public controversies.

Among its notable members are:

- Captain Metropolis / Nelson Gardner — Founding member of the Minutemen who would later found the Crimebusters. He was killed in a road accident.
- Dollar Bill / William Brady — Former member of the Minutemen who died trying to stop a bank robbery after his cape was caught in a revolving door.
- Hooded Justice — Former member of the Minutemen who had a relationship with Captain Metropolis. He was murdered by Nite Owl after the Comedian framed him for a series of child killings caused by serial killer Rolf Müller.
- Mothman / Byron Lewis — Former member of the Minutemen. Rorschach met him in an asylum following the attack of Ozymandias' creature, and learned some fighting moves from him. Byron later commits suicide by being attracted to the fires of the burning asylum. (Note: Doomsday Clock #4 (March 2018)) He used to hide the pages in Dr. Long's journal that show his mental breakdown during his time with Rorschach.
- Nite Owl / Hollis Mason — Former member of the Minutemen who died fighting the thugs that attacked his home.
- Silhouette / Ursula Zand — Former member of the Minutemen who was killed by the Liquidator.
- Silk Spectre / Sally Jupiter — Former member of the Minutemen, who still loved Edward Blake in spite of his past cruelties, giving birth to their daughter Laurel. She is mentioned to have died some time prior.

=== New Frontiersman ===
The New Frontiersman is a newspaper that published Rorschach's journal, exposing Ozymandias' role in the New York Massacre.

- Seymour David — A junior worker at the New Frontiersman magazine offices. He was “brutally beaten to death” after the publication of Walter's journal.

=== Ozymandias' team ===
- Bubastis — A genetically-altered lynx who was the former pet of Ozymandias.
- Bubastis (clone) — A genetically-altered lynx and the clone of the original Bubastis.
- Mime / Marcos Maez and Marionette / Erika Manson — A criminal husband-and-wife team. Based on the Casey and Andy character of the same name by Andy Weir, Mime is a mime artist-themed villain who wields invisible weapons while Marionette wields wires. Erika grew up around her father's marionette shop, where she befriended the mute Marcos. When her father hung himself after being threatened by crooked cops, she and Marcos badly beat up the cops and pursued a life of crime. She was sent to the orphanage in Grand Forks, North Dakota. They later married and had a child. They were imprisoned for theft and murder until Rorschach freed them on Ozymandias' behalf. Ozymandias offers Marionette and Mime an opportunity to find their son if they help him find Doctor Manhattan. After Manhattan restores the DC Universe, he asks Mime and Marionette to stay, hoping to give them a second chance in raising their daughter Anita, and also because he already planned to reunite them with their other son Clark.
- Nostalgia / Cleopatra Pak — An orphan girl residing outside of Veidt's imprisonment who takes in Bubastis.
- Rorschach / Reggie Long — The son of Malcolm and Gloria Long, who becomes Walter Kovacs's successor as Rorschach. Ozymandias then recruits him as his new employee in his quest to find Doctor Manhattan where their search for him takes them to the DC Universe. When his parents died during the New York massacre, Reggie was traumatized and put into a psychiatric institution, where Mothman taught him how to fight and defend himself. Reginald then reads Kovacs' journal and learns that Adrian Veidt caused the massacre. After escaping the institution, Reggie became Rorschach and initially planned to kill Ozymandias out of revenge. However, Reggie decided to spare Adrian after the latter claimed he had terminal cancer.
- The Squid — An "alien monster" summoned by Ozymandias that caused the New York massacre. (Note: Doomsday Clock #3 (January 2018))

=== Other characters ===
- Anita Maez — The as-yet unborn daughter of Mime and Marionette.
- Gloria Long — Wife of Malcolm Long and mother of Rorschach, who died in the New York massacre caused by Ozymandias' creature.
- Janey Slater — Ex-girlfriend of Doctor Manhattan, whom she blamed for her terminal cancer, unaware that Ozymandias was responsible. After Doctor Manhattan got rid of the nuclear weapons and rewrote his history, Jon is now married to Janey.
- Josef Osterman — The son of Jon Osterman and Janey Slater in a rewritten timeline..
- Malcolm Long — Father of Reggie and former therapist of Walter. He died in the New York massacre caused by Ozymandias' creature.
- Sally Hollis — Daughter of Night Owl and Silk Spectre.
- Watchman (Clark Maez-Driberg) — The firstborn son of Mime and Marionette. He was taken from his mother shortly after birth and raised in secret on Mars by Doctor Manhattan. After several years, he is left by Manhattan on the doorstep of Dan Drieberg and Laurie Juspeczyk to be raised by them. Having been given Manhattan's powers, it is implied Manhattan intends Clark to be that Earth's version of Superman.

== DC Universe ==
The DC Universe is where most of DC's mainline comics take place. As this reality acts as a "Metaverse", it also affects both the Multiverse and Dark Multiverse linked to it.

=== Amazons ===
- Wonder Woman / Diana of Themyscira / Diana Prince — The demigoddess daughter of Zeus and Princess of Themyscira and member of the Justice League. She comes out of hiding to address the United Nations about the metahuman arms race, only to be interrupted by Black Adam, Creeper, and Giganta. Due to a vision by the oracle, the Amazons crash Wonder Woman's battle with Adam and take her back to Themyscira.
- Hippolyta — The Queen of the Amazons in Themyscira and mother of Wonder Woman. She arranges for Wonder Woman to be brought back to Themyscira after the Oracle foretold that Wonder Woman will be severely injured if her fight with Black Adam continues.

=== Arkham Asylum ===
Arkham Asylum is a psychiatric hospital where most of Batman's enemies are locked up. Its inmates include Maxie Zeus, Professor Milo, Victor Zsasz, and Vortex.

=== Atlanteans ===
- Aquaman / Arthur Curry — Member of the Justice League and the king of Atlantis.
- Aqualad / Kaldur'ahm / Jackson Hyde
- Mera — Member of the Justice League and the queen of Atlantis.

=== Batman's team ===
Batman and his allies from Gotham City. The following characters are in this category:

- Batman / Bruce Wayne — Gotham City's superhero who tries to bond with Rorschach and discover his connection to Ozymandias and Doctor Manhattan and member of the Justice League. He once locked him up inside Arkham Asylum to interrogate him under the disguise of a psychiatrist named "Matthew Mason" to verify his claims. After discovering everything that Rorschach said was true, he apologizes to him. Batman and Alfred later persuade Reggie to operate as Rorschach again.
- Alfred Pennyworth — Batman's butler who tries to bond with Rorschach. He even suggested Batman that locking him up on Arkham was a bad idea.
- Batgirl / Barbara Gordon — The daughter of James Gordon.
- Batwoman / Kate Kane — The cousin of Batman.
- James Gordon — The police commissioner of the Gotham City Police Department.
- Lucius Fox — An employee of Wayne Enterprises who tries to convince Batman to cease his vigilante activities before LexCorp buys the company.
- Nightwing / Dick Grayson — The first Robin and former member of the Flying Graysons.
- Red Hood / Jason Todd — The second Robin.

=== Big Monster Action ===
Big Monster Action is an expanded version of Big Science Action and Japan's sanctioned superhero team. Among its members are:

- Rising Sun - The leader of Big Monster Action.
- Goraiko - A psionic construct and member of Big Monster Action.
- Hammersuit Zero-X - A member of Big Monster Action who wears a powered exoskeleton.
- Judomaster - A martial artist member of Big Monster Action.
- Naiad - An aquakinetic member of Big Monster Action.
- Ram - A computer-manipulating member of Big Monster Action.
- Samurai - A wind-manipulating member of Big Monster Action.

=== Black Adam's team ===
Black Adam and his allies from Kahndaq who are made up of those who gained asylum for the rejected metahumans around the world.

- Black Adam / Teth-Adam — Shazam's nemesis and ruler of Kahndaq, who offers to bring asylum to every rejected metahuman around the world. He has been aware of the United States' government being involved in the Superman Theory. After gaining other allies, Adam led the attack on the White House when he is briefly confronted by Superman. He then led his group into getting to Superman while competing against the People's Heroes, the Outsiders, and the Doomed. When Doctor Manhattan undid the experiment that erased the Justice Society of America and the Legion of Super-Heroes, Adam was defeated by Johnny Thunderbolt.
- Creeper / Jack Ryder — He gains asylum in Kahndaq after being rescued by Black Adam from Kobra.
- Doc Dread / Bob Fradon — A childhood friend of Metamorpho. He joins Black Adam in his attack on the White House.
- Giganta / Doris Zeul — She gains asylum in Kahndaq after the League of Villany's meeting was crashed by the Comedian.
- Killer Frost / Louise Lincoln — A former supervillainess who accuses Firestorm of being a government agent. She later joins Black Adam in his attack on the White House.
- Lady Clayface / Sondra Fuller — A former member of Kobra who claims that she was given her powers by the government.
- Man-Bat / Kirk Langstrom — One of the people who expose the Superman Theory. He later accompanied Black Adam in his attack on the White House.
- Manhunter / Leviathan / Mark Shaw — The current leader of the Leviathan organization after he overthrew Talia al Ghul. (Note: As seen in Event Leviathan (2019))
- Sandstorm / Nabil Azmah — Sandstorm is a sand-controlling vigilante.
- Stingaree / Samuel Reese — Former lover of Element Girl who was presumed dead, but later resurfaces as part of Black Adam's army.

=== Court of Owls ===
The Court of Owls are associates of the League of Villainy. Representatives of the group attended their meeting.

=== Daily Planet ===
The Daily Planet is Metropolis' official newspaper. Its employees include chief Perry White and journalists Cat Grant, Jimmy Olsen, Ron Troupe, Steve Lombard, and Jackee Winters.

=== Department of Metahuman Affairs ===
The Department of Metahuman Affairs (DMA) is a government agency established by Martin Stein that created its own metahumans in the United States. Among those involved are:

- Martin Stein — Stein is one half of Firestorm and former member of the Justice League. He founded the DMA to help other metahumans following the death of his son, who was unable to control his metahuman powers. After Doctor Manhattan undoes the experiment that erased the Justice Society of America and the Legion of Super-Heroes, Stein is arrested for his involvement with the DMA.
  - Firestorm (Ronnie Raymond) — A superhero who is the active half of Firestorm, unaware he was being used by the DMA. When Killer Frost claims that Firestorm is a government agent, he denies any knowledge of it. His powers are later manipulated by Doctor Manhattan, turning Russian citizens into glass statues. When Ronnie confronts Manhattan, the latter reveals that Stein orchestrated his transformation into Firestorm to study metahumans. Following Stein's arrest, Ronnie undergoes treatment at Doctor Mid-Nite's clinic.
- Elasti-Girl / Rita Farr — A former actress and former member of the Doom Patrol. She and the Doom Patrol are among the heroes who confront Doctor Manhattan on Mars.
- Element Girl / Urania Blackwell — A former spy whose powers were unstable, causing her to commit suicide.
- Helga Jace — A Markovian scientist who exposes the Superman Theory.
- Hyena / Summer Day — An hyena-like villain who is an enemy of Firestorm. She is among the metahumans who are said to have gained their powers from the government.
- Moonbow / Brittany Brandon — An agent of the DMA who infiltrated the League of Villainy and was later confirmed to be associated with them.
- Typhoon / David Drake — An agent of the Department of Metahuman Affairs and an enemy of Firestorm who can manipulate weather. He infiltrates the League of Villainy, during which he is killed by Comedian.

=== Doom Patrol ===
Members of the Doom Patrol are among the superheroes who confront Doctor Manhattan on Mars. They consist of:

- Chief / Niles Caulder — Leader of the Doom Patrol.
- Crazy Jane / Kay Challis — Member of the Doom Patrol.
- Negative Man / Larry Trainor — Member of the Doom Patrol.
- Robotman / Cliff Steele — Member of the Doom Patrol.
- Elasti-Girl / Rita Farr - Member of the Doom Patrol.
- Flex Mentallo — Ally of the Doom Patrol.

=== Doomed ===
The Doomed are India's sanctioned superhero team. Among its members are leader Celsius and members Aalok, Animal-Vegetable-Mineral Man, Aruna, Beast Girl, Maya, Solstice, and Son of Kalki.

=== Elite Basij ===
The Elite Basij is Iran's sanctioned superhero team. Among its members are leader Seyeh the Seer and members Blacksmith, Manticore, Patient One, Scirocco, and Super-Shayk.

=== Great Twenty ===
The Great Twenty is an expanded version of the Great Ten and China's sanctioned superhero team. Among its members are:

- Super-Man / Kong Kenan — Leader of the Great Twenty and China's version of Superman who has the life energy of a dead Kryptonian.
- Accomplished Perfect Physician — A magic-using member of the Great Twenty.
- August General in Iron — A member of the Great Twenty who has superhuman strength and can grow iron plates on his body.
- Bat-Man / Wang Baixi — A member of the Great Twenty and China's version of Batman.
- Celestial Archer — An archery member of the Great Twenty.
- Dao — Member of the Great Twenty.
- Flash / Avery Ho — A member of the Great Twenty and China's version of Flash.
- Ghost Fox Killer — A ghost-controlling member of the Great Twenty.
- Gloss — Member of the Great Twenty.
- Guanxi — Member of the Great Twenty.
- Immortal Man-in-Darkness — A member of the Great Twenty who pilots the Dragonwing aircraft.
- Mother of Champions — A member of the Great Twenty who can give birth to 25 genetically-altered super soldiers every three days.
- Night-Dragon — Member of the Great Twenty.
- Ri — Member of the Great Twenty.
- Seven Deadly Brothers — A member of the Great Twenty who can split into seven clones.
- Shaolin Robot — An automaton who is a member of the Great Twenty.
- Socialist Red Guardsman — An armored member of the Great Twenty with solar radiation abilities.
- Striker Z — Member of the Great Twenty.
- Thundermind — A telepathic member of the Great Twenty.
- Wonder-Woman / Peng Deilan — A member of the Great Twenty and China's counterpart of Wonder Woman.

=== Green Lantern Corps ===
The Green Lantern Corps are a group of intergalactic law enforcers who wield the green power ring. Prominent members include Hal Jordan, Guy Gardner, John Stewart, and Jessica Cruz.

=== Hayoth ===
The Hayoth is Israel's sanctioned superhero team. Among its members are:

- Seraph / Chaim Levon — Leader of the Hayoth.
- Dybbuk — An A.I. who is a member of the Hayoth.
- Golem — A member of the Hayoth who has a clay-like body.
- Judith — A martial artist and swordswoman member of the Hayoth.
- Pteradon — A Pteranodon-like member of the Hayoth.
- Ramban — A magician and member of the Hayoth.

=== Justice League ===
The Justice League is a superhero group that Superman, Wonder Woman, and Batman are a part of. Some of its members confronted Doctor Manhattan on Mars. Among its members are:

- Black Canary / Dinah Lance — Member of the Justice League.
- Cyborg / Victor Stone — Member of the Justice League.
- Green Arrow / Oliver Queen — Member of the Justice League and Star City's superhero.
- Hawkgirl / Kendra Saunders — Member of the Justice League.
- Martian Manhunter / J'onn J'onzz — Member of the Justice League. He suggested reasoning with Doctor Manhattan only for the superheroes to fight him instead after they see Martian Manhunter's mental broadcast of Doctor Manhattan's future encounter with Superman.
- Vixen / Mari McCabe — She is among the superheroes who confront Doctor Manhattan on Mars.

=== Justice League Dark ===
The Justice League Dark is an occult branch of the Justice League. They are among the superheroes who confront Doctor Manhattan on Mars. Doctor Manhattan's analysis states that their magic is from the "scraps of Creation." Among its members are:

- John Constantine — Streetwise exorcist and leader of the Justice League Dark.
- Deadman — Member of the Justice League Dark.
- Etrigan the Demon / Jason Blood — Member of the Justice League Dark.
- Swamp Thing / Alec Holland — Member of the Justice League Dark.
- Zatanna Zatara — Member of the Justice League Dark.

=== Justice League Europe ===
Justice League Europe is France's sanctioned superhero team. Among its members are:

- Crimson Fox — Leader of the Justice League Europe.
- Fleur-de-Lis — Member of the Justice League Europe.
- Hunchback — Member of the Justice League Europe.
- Musketeer — Member of the Justice League Europe.
- Nightrunner — Member of the Justice League Europe.
- Thief of Arts — Member of the Justice League Europe.

=== Justice Society of America ===
The Justice Society of America is a team of superheroes from the Pre-Flashpoint era that existed since the 1940s. Lois Lane later finds a flash-drive that talks about them. Lois didn't know about the Justice Society until now. It was revealed that Lex Luthor was the one who discovered the drive and sent it to Lois Lane. When Doctor Manhattan undid the experiment that erased the Justice Society of America and Legion of Super-Heroes, the Justice Society of America appeared to help Superman fight the rampaging metahumans.

Among its members are:

- Green Lantern / Alan Scott — Founder of the Justice Society of America, whose fate was altered by Doctor Manhattan resulting on his death when Doctor Manhattan moved the lantern inches from his reach. This was later undone by Doctor Manhattan as he and the Justice Society of America assist in fighting Black Adam's group and the foreign superheroes.
- Atom Smasher / Albert Rothstein — A size-shifting superhero and grandson of Al Pratt.
- Cyclone / Maxine Hunkel — A wind-manipulating superhero and granddaughter of Ma Hunkel.
- Damage / Grant Emerson — A teenage metahuman and ally of the Justice Society of America who gained his powers from Project Telemachus.
- Doctor Fate / Kent Nelson — The magical member of the Justice Society of America.
- Doctor Mid-Nite / Beth Chapel — A medical superhero who uses special goggles to see in the dark after losing her sight. Following the fight against Black Adam's group and the foreign superheroes, Doctor Mid-Nite is mentioned to have opened a metahuman medical clinic called the All-Star Clinic, where Ronnie Raymond receives treatment.
- Flash / Jay Garrick — The speedster member of the Justice Society of America.
- Hawkman / Carter Hall — A member of the Justice Society of America and member of the Justice league.
- Hourman / Rex Tyler — A member of the Justice Society of America who uses Miraclo to get superpowers for one hour.
- Hourman / Rick Tyler — The son of Rex Tyler who became the second Hourman.
- Jade / Jennifer-Lynn Hayden — A Starheart-wielding superhero who is the daughter of Alan Scott and the twin sister of Obsidian.
- Jakeem Thunder — An African-American boy who is the current owner of Johnny Thunderbolt.
- Jonathan "Johnny" Thunder — A former member of the Justice Society of America who lives in a retirement home and is the only one to remember the Justice Society. (Note: As seen in DC Universe: Rebirth Special #1 (2016)) When Doctor Manhattan undoes the experiment that erased the Justice Society of America and the Legion of Super-Heroes, Thunder is reunited with Thunderbolt.
  - Thunderbolt / Yz — A jinn from the Fifth Dimension who used to be Johnny Thunder's partner, but disappeared after Joseph McCarthy had Thunder reveal his secret identity. When Doctor Manhattan undoes the experiment that erased the Justice Society of America and the Legion of Super-Heroes, Thunderbolt is reunited with Thunder.
- Liberty Belle / Jesse Chambers — A superhero with super-speed.
- Mister Terrific / Michael Holt — A superhero with genius-level intellect who wields T-Spheres.
- Obsidian / Todd Rice — A superhero who can merge his body with his own shadow. He is the son of Alan Scott and the twin brother of Jade.
- Power Girl / Kara Zor-El / Karen Starr — An alternate universe version of Supergirl.
- Sandman / Sanderson Hawkins — A superhero with a silicon-based body and the former sidekick of the original Sandman.
- Sandman / Wesley Dodds — A member of the Justice Society of America.
- Stargirl / Courtney Whitmore — A superhero who uses the equipment that formerly belonged to the Star-Spangled Kid.
- S.T.R.I.P.E. / Patrick Dugan — The stepfather of Stargirl who pilots a large powered armor.
- Spectre / James Corrigan - A member of the Justice Society of America.
- Wildcat / Ted Grant — A cat-themed member of the Justice Society of America. He was present at Jack Johnson's third wedding.
- Wildcat / Yolanda Montez — A cat-themed member of the Justice Society of America and the goddaughter of Ted Grant.

=== Knights Inc. ===
Knights Inc is the United Kingdom's sanctioned superhero team. Among its members are:

- Knight — Leader of Knights Inc.
- Beaumont — Member of Knights Inc.
- Canterbury Cricket — Member of Knights Inc.
- Crusader — Member of Knights Inc.
- Godiva — Member of Knights Inc.
- Golden Pharaoh — Member of Knights Inc.
- Hood — Member of Knights Inc.
- Jack O'Lantern — Member of Knights Inc.
- Lionheart — Member of Knights Inc.
- Looking Glass — Member of Knights Inc.
- Mistress Hyde — Member of Knights Inc.
- Ridge — Member of Knights Inc.
- Silent Knight — Member of Knights Inc.
- Squire — Member of Knights Inc.
- Templar — Member of Knights Inc.

=== League of Villainy ===
The League of Villainy was a gathering of villains who met to discuss the Superman Theory in an abandoned subway tunnel. The group was discovered by Comedian, who crashed the meeting. The villains include the leader Riddler, as well as Black Bison, Black Mask, Doctor Poison, Doctor Psycho, Doctor Sivana, Hector Hammond, Mad Hatter, Mr. Freeze, Penguin, Professor Pyg, Sonar, Tattooed Man, and Two-Face.

- Penguin / Oswald Cobblepot — A member of the League of Villainy.
- Professor Pyg / Lazlo Valentin — A member of the League of Villainy.
- Sonar / Bito Wladon — A member of the League of Villainy.
- Tattooed Man / Abel Tarrant — A member of the League of Villainy. He states that Sanctuary "screwed up" his successor. (Note: As seen in Heroes in Crisis (2018-2019))
- Thaddeus Sivana — A member of the League of Villainy.
- Two-Face / Harvey Dent — A member of the League of Villainy.

=== Legion of Super-Heroes ===
The Legion of Super-Heroes are a superhero group that exist in the 31st century. When Doctor Manhattan undid the experiment that resulted in the Legion of Super-Heroes and the Justice Society of America being erased, the Legion appeared to help Superman fight the rampaging metahumans.

Among its members are:

- Blok — A Dryad and member of the Legion of Super-Heroes who can absorb energy.
- Bouncing Boy — A member of the Legion of Super-Heroes with an inflatable body.
- Brainiac 5 — A Coluan and member of the Legion of Super-Heroes.
- Chameleon Boy — A shapeshifting Durlan and member of the Legion of Super-Heroes.
- Colossal Boy — A size-shifting member of the Legion of Super-Heroes.
- Cosmic Boy / Rokk Krinn — A founding member of the Legion of Super-Heroes with magnetic abilities.
- Element Lad — A Tromite and member of the Legion of Super-Heroes who can transmute elements.
- Ferro Lad — A member of the Legion of Super-Heroes who can turn into iron.
- Lighting Lad / Garth Ranzz — A Winathian and founding member of the Legion of Super-Heroes with electrical abilities.
- Mon-El — A Daxamite and member of the Legion of Super-Heroes with powers similar to the Kryptonians.
- R. J. Brande — The Durlan benefactor of the Legion of Super-Heroes.
- Saturn Girl / Imra Ardeen — A Titanian and founding member of the Legion of Super-Heroes who possesses telepathy. She appears as an inmate of Arkham Asylum designated as "Jane Doe". Saturn Girl is later erased from existence, but is resurrected after Doctor Manhattan restores the timeline.
- Shadow Lass — A Talokian member of the Legion of Super-Heroes who can generate darkness within a radius around her.
- Star Boy / Thom Kallor — A Xanthuan member of the Legion of Super-Heroes who can manipulate mass, density, and gravity.
- Sun Boy — A member of the Legion of Super-Heroes who can generate heat and light.
- Timber Wolf — A Zuunian member of the Legion of Super-Heroes who possesses wolf-like abilities.
- Triplicate Girl / Luornu Durgo — A Carggite and member of the Legion of Super-Heroes who can split into three different bodies.
- Ultra Boy — A member of the Legion of Super-Heroes who possesses powers similar to Superman, but can only use one power at a time.
- Wildfire — A member of the Legion of Super-Heroes who is composed of thermonuclear energy.

=== LexCorp ===
- Alexander Luthor — The CEO of LexCorp and Superman's nemesis who works with Lois to uncover the truth behind the Superman Theory. He was previously approached by Ozymandias with an offer to find Doctor Manhattan, but their meeting was interrupted by the Comedian. Luthor later visited Lois Lane, revealing himself as the one who gave Lois the flash-drive containing the footage of the Justice Society and that he suspects that Wally West holds the answers about Doctor Manhattan's manipulations. As payback for his previous injuries, Luthor uses a device to send the Comedian back to the moment of his death.
- Mercy Graves — Luthor's assistant.

=== Metal Men ===
The Metal Men are a group of robots. They are among the superheroes who head to Mars to confront Doctor Manhattan. The Metal Men consist of Gold, Lead, Iron, Mercury, Platinum, and Tin.

=== New Gods ===
The New Gods are a group of beings that live on either New Genesis or Apokolips. Among the New Gods are:

- Big Barda / Barda Free — A New Goddess from New Genesis and the wife of Mister Miracle and member of the Justice league. She is among the superheroes who head to Mars to confront Doctor Manhattan.
- Darkseid / Uxas — A New God who rules Apokolips. He was shown in Guy Gardner's construct that Doctor Manhattan reviews.
- Mister Miracle / Scott Free — A New God from New Genesis and the husband of Big Barda and member of the Justice league. He is among the superheroes who head to Mars to confront Doctor Manhattan.

=== Outsiders ===
The Outsiders are Markovia's sanctioned superhero team. Among its members are:

- Geo-Force / Brion Markov — Prince of Markovia and leader of the Outsiders' Markovian branch.
- Baroness Bedlam — Member of the Outsiders' Markovian branch.
- Knightfall — Member of the Outsiders' Markovian branch.
- Terra — Member of the Outsiders' Markovian branch.
- Wylde — Member of the Outsiders' Markovian branch.

There is also a faction of the Outsiders that were previously established by Batman:

- Black Lightning / Jefferson Pierce — He joins Batman's incarnation of the Outsiders in confronting Doctor Manhattan.
- Halo / Gabrielle Doe — Member of Batman's incarnation of the Outsiders. She joins them in confronting Doctor Manhattan.
- Katana / Tatsu Yamashiro - Member of Batman's incarnation of the Outsiders.
- Metamorpho / Rex Mason — Former member of the Department of Metahuman Affairs. He is one of the people who expose the Superman Theory. He later joins Batman's incarnation of the Outsiders when they confront Doctor Manhattan.

=== People's Heroes ===
The People's Heroes are Russia's sanctioned superhero team. Among its members are:

- Pozhar / Mikhail Arkadin — A metahuman with powers similar to Firestorm. He is recruited by Vladimir Putin to lead the People's Heroes.
- Black Eagle — A member of the People's Heroes.
- Firebird / Serafina Arkadin —
- Lady Flash / Ivana Molotova — A speedster who joined the People's Heroes.
- Morozko / Igor Medviedenko —
- Negative Woman / Valentina Vostok — Former member of the Doom Patrol and current member of the People's Heroes.
- Perun / Ilya Trepliov —
- Red Star / Leonid Kovar — A member of the People's Heroes.
- Rusalka -
- Steel Wolf / Ivan Illyich Gort —
- Tundra — A cryokinetic super-strong heroine.
- Vikhor -
- Vostok-X — A member of the People's Heroes who wears an Atlantean helmet and a jetpack.

=== Rogues ===
The Rogues are a group of villains from Central City and enemies of Flash who join the League of Villainy.

- Captain Cold / Leonard Snart — Leader of the Rogues who joins the League of Villainy.
- Captain Boomerang / George Harkness — Former member of the Suicide Squad who joins the League of Villainy.
- Heat Wave / Mick Rory — A member of the League of Villainy.
- Mirror Master / Samuel Scudder — A member of the League of Villainy.
- Top / Roscoe Dillon — A member of the League of Villainy.

=== Shazam's team ===
Billy Batson and his foster siblings associated with the wizard Shazam.

- Shazam / William Batson — A boy chosen by the wizard Shazam to share his powers and Member of the Justice League. The character was introduced during the Golden Age of Comics by Fawcett Comics.
- Pedro Peña — Member of the Shazam Family with super-strength.
- Mary Bromfield — Sister of Shazam and member of the Shazam Family.
- Eugene Choi — Member of the Shazam Family who has technopathic abilities.
- Freddy Freeman — Member of the Shazam Family.
- Darla Dudley — Member of the Shazam Family with super-speed.

=== Sinestro Corps ===
The Sinestro Corps are enemies of the Green Lantern Corps.

- Sinestro — Leader of the Sinestro Corps.

=== Sleeping Soldiers ===
The Sleeping Soldiers are Australia's sanctioned superhero team. Among its members are:

- Dreamer — Leader of the Sleeping Soldiers.
- Argonaut — Member of the Sleeping Soldiers.
- Dark Ranger — Member of the Sleeping Soldiers.
- Miss Midnight — Member of the Sleeping Soldiers.
- Tasmanian Devil — A Tasmanian devil-like superhero and member of the Sleeping Soldiers.
- Umbaluru — Member of the Sleeping Soldiers.

=== Suicide Squad ===
The Suicide Squad are a group of prisoners that work for A.R.G.U.S. in exchange for suspended sentences. Captain Boomerang mentioned that most of the Suicide Squad members were defeated by Black Adam in their mission to Kahndaq.

- Amanda Waller — The superior of the Suicide Squad and director of A.R.G.U.S.
- Harley Quinn / Harleen Quinzel — Frenemy of Batman and ex-associate of Joker. She appears in a photograph inside Joker's funhouse.

=== Super-Family ===
Relatives and friends of Superman. (Note: As revealed in Superwoman #9 (2017))

- Superman / Kal-El / Clark Kent — A survivor of Krypton and superhero of Metropolis and founding member of the Justice League. He was initially the only superhero wanted in the world during the Metahuman Arms Race, but his status was dismissed after attempting to interfere in Russia's misleading incident with Firestorm. The explosion caused by Bubastis placed him and Batman in a coma as Lois stays by his side. Doctor Manhattan analyzes Superman's history that also includes his Earth-One, Earth-Two and New Earth counterparts. By the time Manhattan arrives on Earth, Superman wakes up from his coma in desperation. After stopping Pozhar from attacking Doctor Manhattan, Superman persuades him to undo his experiments in the past. Doctor Manhattan also foresees some later events that Superman will be involved in
- Clara Kent — A descendant of Superman in the year 2045.
- Colin Kent — A descendant of Superman in the year 2038.
- Lana Lang — Former love interest of Superman. He appeared in a nightmare of Superman's.
- Lois Lane — Superman's wife who works with Luthor to uncover the truth behind the Superman Theory, whom she originally suspected. When Superman unsuccessfully attempts to prevent Firestorm's incident in Russia, Lois stood by his comatose body at the Hall of Justice. She receives a visit from Luthor, explaining that he sent the USB drive containing information about the Justice Society of America while also mentioning that Wally West might hold the key behind Manhattan's manipulations.
- Jonathan and Martha Kent — Superman's adoptive parents who died in a car crash. When Doctor Manhattan restores the timeline, the Kents are resurrected.
- Pete Ross — Former childhood friend of Superman. He appeared in a nightmare of Superman's.
- Sam Lane — A U. S. Army General who is the father of Lois, and father-in-law of Superman whom he despised from the sole reason of being an alien. Lane later admits his personal involvement in the Superman Theory.
- Steel / John Henry Irons — An armored superhero and ally of Superman.
- Superboy / Jonathan Samuel Kent — The son of Superman and Lois Lane. He was mentioned by Lois during an argument with Perry White.
- Supergirl / Kara Zor-El / Kara Danvers — The cousin of Superman.

=== Team Flash ===
- Flash / Bartholomew Allen — The second Flash and Central City's superhero. He is among the superheroes who confront Doctor Manhattan on Mars and member of the Justice League.
- Flash / Wallace West — Barry Allen's nephew, as well as the first Kid Flash, and later the third Flash. He is the one who suspected Doctor Manhattan modified reality after the Flashpoint event.
- Iris West — A manifestation of Wally West's fear of not being able to see his family again that was born in the Dark Multiverse. She is the twin sister of Jai West and was emigrated to Earth 0 by Wally West. (Note: As seen in Flash Forward #1-6 (2019-2020)) In Doctor Manhattan's vision of a possible future, Iris becomes Kid Flash.
- Turtle / Jai West — A manifestation of Wally West's fear of not being able to see his family again who was born in the Dark Multiverse. He is the twin brother of Iris West and was emigrated to Earth 0. In Doctor Manhattan's vision of a possible future, Jai becomes a superhero called Turtle.

=== Teen Titans ===
The Teen Titans are a group of young superheroes. Among its members are:

- Donna Troy — Member of the Titans.
- Starfire / Koriand'r — A Tamaranean member of the Teen Titans and the Justice League Odyssey.

=== Other characters ===
- Albert and Karl Verner — Two brothers and film producers who used to work with Carver Colman in most of their films.
- Alpha Centurion / Roman — He is among the superheroes who confront Doctor Manhattan on Mars.
- Animal Man / Bernhard Baker — He is among the superheroes who confront Doctor Manhattan on Mars.
- Anti-Monitor / Mobius — A cosmic entity and the embodiment of antimatter.
- Atom / Ray Palmer — He is among the superheroes who confront Doctor Manhattan on Mars.
- Atomic Knight / Gardner Grayle — He is among the superheroes who confront Doctor Manhattan on Mars.
- The Batman Who Laughs — An evil counterpart of Batman from Earth -22 in the Dark Multiverse who was exposed to Joker venom and went mad. He commanded the Dark Knights under the guidance of Barbatos. (Note: As seen in Dark Nights: Metal (2017-2018)) The Batman Who Laughs was shown in Guy Gardner's construct that Doctor Manhattan reviews.
- Blue Devil / Daniel Cassidy — He is among the superheroes who confront Doctor Manhattan on Mars.
- Booster Gold / Michael Jon Carter — He is among the superheroes who confront Doctor Manhattan on Mars.
- Brainiac / Vril Dox — Another of Superman's enemies. He was shown in Guy Gardner's construct that Doctor Manhattan reviews.
- Bruce Nelson — A detective of the San Francisco Police Department who previously investigated the murder of Carver Colman. The character was introduced during the Earth-Two era.
- Bumblebee / Karen Beecher — She is among the superheroes who confront Doctor Manhattan on Mars.
- Captain Atom / Nathaniel Adam — He is the basis of Doctor Manhattan. Captain Atom is among the superheroes who confront Manhattan on Mars.
- Carver Colman — A noir film actor who portrayed the character Nathaniel Dusk. The character was introduced during the Earth-Two era. During the premiere of his last film, Colman was bludgeoned to death with an award he won. His murder started an investigation which revealed that Colman claimed to be the son of Irish immigrants and being raised on Merrillville, Indiana, but many doubts emerged after the San Francisco police discovered his true location on Beverly Hills, California. Several documents showed Colman was blackmailed by his real mother Charlotte, who conceived him with a member of the Sabella crime family, but kicked Colman out after discovering he was gay. The truth was Charlotte killed Colman after her failed blackmailing, and made it look like a robbery; among the evidence of Colman's death, there was a letter from Charlotte, which was later burnt by his cleaning maid to protect his secrets and prevent his acting career from being ruined. When visited by Doctor Manhattan, Colman's fate was prevented and he comes out to the public, preventing his death. Colman became an advocate for social activism and homosexuality, dying in 2005.
- Charlotte Colman — Carver Colman's single mother and a former exotic dancer. She killed her own son after failing to blackmail him. This was later prevented by Doctor Manhattan.
- Despero — He was shown in a hologram that Doctor Manhattan reviews.
- Doomsday — He was shown in Guy Gardner's construct that Doctor Manhattan reviews.
- Dove / Dawn Granger — Hawk's partner who gets arrested in Russia.
- Elongated Man / Randolph Dibny — He is among the superheroes who confront Doctor Manhattan.
- Firehawk (Theresa) — She is among the superheroes who confront Doctor Manhattan on Mars.
- Frank Farr — Father of Elasti-Girl, who was conceived when he was having an affair during his first marriage.
- Hawk / Extant / Hank Hall — Dove's partner, who was formerly a villain known as Extant.
- Huntress — She appears in Doctor Manhattan's vision of Earth-Two.
- Jack Johnson — A war veteran who was celebrating his third marriage. He was also a friend and comrade of Sgt. Rock as he requested a moment of silence to honor him.
- John Law — A screenwriter who was originally suspected for Carver Colman's murder, but was later released because he was on Santa Monica Boulevard. The character was introduced during the Quality Comics era.
- Joker — Batman's nemesis who takes an interest in Mime and Marionette. When Batman used Metron's Mobius Chair to know the Joker's true name, the Chair revealed that "there are three." (Note: As revealed in Justice League Vol. 2 #50 (2016))
- Joseph Morgan — Former trainer of Wildcat. The character was introduced during the Earth-Two era.
- Nightshade (Eve Eden) — She is the basis of Silk Spectre.
- Red Tornado — He is among the superheroes who confront Doctor Manhattan on Mars.
- Robert Reed — In the form of Human Starfish, he is among the superheroes who head to Mars to confront Doctor Manhattan.
- Sandra Stanyon — The ex-wife of Jonathan Lord.
- Superboy-Prime — A villainous alternate universe version of Superman from Earth-33.
- Tin Soldier / Randy Booth — An actor who interrupted Jack Johnson's third wedding.

== Guest characters ==
The following characters appearing in this version are from real life.

- Alicia Malone -
- Bryce DeWitt — A scientist who proposed the many-worlds interpretation.
- Donald Trump — The President of the United States during present day in the DC Universe. He is later mentioned to be undergoing impeachment.
- Fred Coe - A TV producer and director.
- Gary Cooper — An actor who worked with Carver Colman during his last film.
- Hedy Lamarr — An actress who worked with Carver Colman during his last film.
- John Hinckley Jr. — A man who attempted to assassinate Ronald Reagan to impress Jodie Foster. In the Watchmen universe, he succeeded in doing so.
- Jonathan Lord - A British politician.
- Otto Preminger — A film producer who worked with Carver Colman during his last film.
- Richard Nixon — President of the United States during 1985 in the Watchmen universe.
- Robert Redford — President of the United States during 1992 in the Watchmen universe.
- Ronald Reagan — President of the United States between 1981 and 1989. In the Watchmen universe, he was successfully assassinated by John Hinckley Jr.
- Vladimir Putin — The President of Russia during present day in the DC Universe and the founder of the People's Heroes.
- William F. Buckley Jr. — In the Watchmen universe, he publicly announced nuclear warfare because of the exposure of Ozymandias' massacre.

== See also ==
- List of DC Comics characters
- List of Watchmen characters
