= Secret Empire =

Secret Empire may refer to:

- Secret Empire (organization), an evil organization in Marvel Comics
  - Secret Empire (1974 comic), comic book storyline
  - Secret Empire (2017 comic), comic book storyline
- The Secret Empire, a serialized story in the TV series Cliffhangers
