= Sonar (comics) =

Sonar is the name of three fictional characters appearing in American comic books published by DC Comics.

== Publication history ==
The Bito Wladon version of Sonar first appeared in Green Lantern (vol. 2) #14 and was created by John Broome and Gil Kane.

== Fictional character biography ==
=== Bito Wladon ===
Sonar
- Sonar's first appearance in Green Lantern (vol. 2) #14 (July 1962), art by Gil Kane.

Publication information
- Publisher: DC Comics
- First appearance: Green Lantern (vol. 2) #14 (July 1962)
- Created by: John Broome (writer); Gil Kane (artist)

In-story information
- Alter ego: Bito Wladon
- Species: Metahuman
- Team affiliations: The Society
- Abilities: Sonic weaponry, unknown flight device

Bito Wladon originates from the small Balkan country of Modora. Modora was willingly isolated from the rest of the world by Fando, a leader who believed Modora should be frozen in its past, and cut off access to the outside world while making all decisions for his countrymen.

Wladon's parents are deaf, which causes them to be shunned. Although Wladon can hear, he is shunned by association. Wladon becomes the apprentice to a clockmaker while he works on creating the "nucleo-sonic motor", which utilizes sound to create destructive blasts and nullify gravity.

Realizing that Modora is not technologically advanced enough to support his endeavors, Wladon leaves for the United States. He becomes a criminal to steal the supplies necessary for his exploits. American media dubs him Sonar because of his mastery of sound.

Sonar vs. Green Lantern, art by Mike Grell.

After returning home from a meeting with the Green Lantern Corps, Green Lantern Hal Jordan visits Modora to get a stamp for Tom Kalmaku's stamp collection, during which he learns of Sonar and his scientific discoveries.

Meanwhile, Sonar returns to Modora by crossing the Atlantic Ocean. His tuning fork gun leaves a trail of radiation, which allows Jordan to track him down and stop him. Although he is stripped of his weapons and stolen technology before being imprisoned, Sonar is proud of his newfound notoriety. The people of Modora show their gratitude to Green Lantern by creating a postage stamp for him, which he gives to Kalmaku to complete his stamp collection.

Weeks later, Sonar is released from prison due to his assistance in the annual harvest. He secretly orchestrates an invasion of one of Modora's bordering countries, then murders Fando and the royal family and becomes the ruler of Modora.

Sonar is reintroduced in "The New 52" continuity reboot, where he attacks a carnival in Coast City with his bomb. Sonar sends a broadcast message to Modora, say that he will terrorize with more bombs with his sound. Hal Jordan pursues Sonar to Kahndaq, where the former captures Modoran soldiers, demanding they tell him where Sonar is. The Modoran soldiers kill themselves with bombs implanted in their necks to avoid being caught. In an unknown lair, Sonar watches the news of the United Nations General Assembly. He secretly plants a bomb device made of hearing aids, waiting to trigger the sound bomb at the ambassador debate, but his plan fails when Jordan prevents the debate, removes all the hearing aids and shields the ambassadors from the explosion radius. Sonar is furious and vows that Modora will be rebuilt.

=== Second Sonar ===
An unnamed incarnation of Sonar appears in Doom Patrol (vol. 2) #6.

=== Third Sonar ===
The third Sonar, Green Lantern (vol. 3) #67, art by Paul Pelletier.

The third Sonar is alleged to be Bito Wladon's son, Bito Wladon Jr. Sonar first appears in Keystone City, where he fights Flash. The battle is brief, with Sonar fleeing from Keystone to find a larger city to conquer. Sonar later arrives in New York City and uses the sounds of Manhattan against Kyle Rayner. Sonar is defeated when the Flash causes him to accelerate faster than sound.

== Powers and abilities ==
Bito Wladon carries a Sonic Sceptre, a device that enables him to absorb sound, which he can also use to fly, project illusions, fire sonic attacks, and telekinetically manipulate objects.

The third Sonar is cybernetically enhanced to harness ambient sound and use for his own purposes. He usually attacks by firing sonic blasts.

== Other versions ==
- Lady Sonar, a heroic counterpart of Sonar from the antimatter universe, appears in JLA Secret Files and Origins.
- Sonarr, an unrelated superhero, is introduced in Justice League Quarterly #8.
- Sonar appears in JLA/Avengers #3 as a brainwashed minion of Krona.
- An alternate universe version of Sonar appears in Flashpoint. This version is a member of Deathstroke's pirate crew who is later killed during a mutiny.
- An alternate universe version of Sonar appears in JLA: Act of God. This version possesses cybernetic augmentations and a fixation on Kyle Rayner, who he later kills.

== In other media ==
- The Bito Wladon incarnation of Sonar makes non-speaking cameo appearances in Justice League Unlimited as a member of Gorilla Grodd's Secret Society.
- The Flashpoint incarnation of Bito Wladon / Sonar appears in Justice League: The Flashpoint Paradox.
- The Bito Wladon incarnation of Sonar appears as a character summon in Scribblenauts Unmasked: A DC Comics Adventure.
