= Superman & Bugs Bunny =

2000 comic miniseries

- A page of Superman & Bugs Bunny #3 (September 2000).

Publication information
- Publisher: DC Comics
- Schedule: Monthly
- Format: Limited series
- Genre: Science fiction
- Publication date: July 2000 - October 2000
- No. of issues: 4
- Main character(s): Justice League; Looney Tunes

Creative team
- Written by: Mark Evanier
- Penciller: Joe Staton
- Inker(s): Mike DeCarlo; Tom Palmer
- Letterer: Phil Felix
- Colorist: Patricia Mulvihill
- Editor: Joey Cavalieri

Superman & Bugs Bunny is a four-issue comics miniseries released in 2000 by DC Comics. It is the first official DC crossover between the DC Universe and the Looney Tunes characters.

== Plot ==
=== The DC Superheroes Meet the Looney Tunes! ===
In Metropolis, Clark Kent and Lois Lane are investigating reports of a mysterious giant plane (the work of the villainous Toyman) when they encounter Mr. Mxyzptlk. He causes a 'Czarbucks' coffee shop to grow out of the ground like a plant and begins to "seed" the whole city with similar pointless businesses. Clark switches to Superman to pursue him, but ultimately uses his civilian identity to trick Mxyzptlk into saying his name backwards (by getting him to read a list to which Clark has added "Kltpzyxm").

Meanwhile, "in a forest on the edge of some other city in some other universe", Elmer Fudd corners Bugs Bunny. When he tries to shoot Bugs, though, his bullets turn into flowers. This is the work of Yoyo the Dodo, who has left Wackyland via a dimensional transporter in search of people to annoy, but is feeling inadequate due to the fact everyone in the Looney Tunes' world is already crazy. The transporter is not working, leaving him unable to search elsewhere. Inspired by a Superman comic, Bugs tricks Yoyo into saying "Od-od" (Do-do backwards), which sends him to another dimension.

During their respective trips, Mxyzptlk and Yoyo collide and crash-land in yet another dimension. When Mxyzptlk learns that the world Yoyo just left has no superheroes, they build a larger transporter so Mxyzptlk can go to the Looney Tunes' world and cause chaos there. However, he soon learns why Yoyo left when he encounters Foghorn Leghorn (who pies him in the face), Daffy Duck (who drops an anvil on him) and the Tasmanian Devil (who tries to eat him). Mxyzptlk's disappointment is short-lived, as he then comes up with a plan to cause chaos in the DC Universe by sending the Looney Tunes there. Soon the DC superheroes are encountering the Looney Tunes; Green Lantern catches Marvin the Martian plotting to destroy Earth on the Moon, the Flash finds himself racing Speedy Gonzales and later the Road Runner (the latter being pursued by Wile E. Coyote), Plastic Man disguises himself as a cat to spy on a cat-loving gangster only to be romanced by Pepé Le Pew before encountering Sylvester and Tweety, Aquaman is nearly blown out of the water by Yosemite Sam's pirate ship and Batman, on the trail of the Penguin, instead finds Playboy Penguin. The Looney Tunes do not find this unusual, but the fact that they only appear briefly and then vanish means that the superheroes are soon questioning their own sanity. Meanwhile, Mxyzptlk plots to cause even more havoc by swapping Superman with Elmer Fudd.

=== The Wast Son of Kwypton! ===
Mr. Mxyzptlk and the Do-do's partnership turns sour (mostly because the Do-do keeps playing pranks on Mxyzptlk) as the DC superheroes continue to encounter the Looney Tunes - Batman and Plastic Man team up to defeat the Penguin and the gangster Plastic Man was tailing only to meet Charlie Dog immediately afterwards. Meanwhile, Bugs Bunny disguises himself as a park ranger and makes Elmer Fudd perform several embarrassing stunts (including wearing a clown suit) to earn a "wabbit hunting license" before Fudd realizes that he has been fooled (because the stunts are actually to get a FISHING license) and angrily chases Bugs. At this point, Mxyzptlk and the Do-do effect their plan. In the Daily Planet office Clark Kent wants to go rabbit hunting while Bugs is confused by Fudd wearing Superman's costume and reciting heroic monologues. While Perry White encounters Henery Hawk (who believes Perry to be a chicken due to Perry using the term in an argument regarding his courage), news suddenly comes in that the Toyman's giant plane is attacking Metropolis. Mxyzptlk and the Do-do arrange for the broadcast to be heard in the Looney Tunes' world as well, prompting Fudd to fly to the rescue with a terrified Bugs (who sarcastically asked to accompany him, believing Fudd was delusional) in tow. Meanwhile, Kent attempts to switch to Superman, only to discover that he is now wearing Fudd's clown suit and has no superpowers. Daffy Duck, Porky Pig and Foghorn Leghorn witness the chaos on the streets and note how "weird and dark and scary!" the DC Universe is before Daffy is suddenly teleported away (the Do-do intends to swap him for Batman). Fudd and Bugs have been transported to Metropolis, where Fudd lands on the plane to confront the Toyman's goons who, like the general public, are confused to see Superman shorter than usual and accompanied by a cartoon rabbit. On the Toyman's orders, the goons prepare to fire a deadly cannon.

=== The Duck Knight Weturns! ===
Green Arrow meets Junior Bear and is given a box that turns out to contain Michigan J. Frog, whose tendency to sing and dance for only one person causes several people to doubt his sanity.

Elmer Fudd, meanwhile, survives being blasted by the Toyman's goons. The cannon is calibrated for the real Superman and the blast goes harmlessly over the much shorter Fudd's head, while Mr. Mxyzptlk gets angry when he finds out that the Do-do swapped Daffy Duck and Batman without his say-so. The two pranksters start fighting and part of the transporter machine gets damaged, causing the Fudd/Superman switch to be undone and leaving Fudd cowering in terror as the goons prepare to shoot him. Luckily, Bugs Bunny rescues Fudd by tricking the goons into arguing and shooting each other, but this leaves the plane spiralling out of control. Clark Kent is watching helplessly from the street when Foghorn Leghorn (who is a fan of Action Comics) recognises him and encourages him to change to Superman, tearing off Kent's shirt for him and revealing that his costume and superpowers have been restored. The Man of Steel rescues Bugs, Fudd and the unconscious goons and crashes the plane harmlessly in the ocean.

In Gotham City, Commissioner Gordon calls Batman only for Daffy to turn up wearing his costume. He heads off to investigate a lead on stolen mechanical parts while Batman puts on a spare Bat-suit and wonders why he wants to fly south for the winter.

Mxyzptlk has tied up the Do-do and taken control of the whole process, only for the transporter (sabotaged by the Do-do) to blow up in his face. This causes the Justice League (consisting of: Superman, Batman, Wonder Woman, Martian Manhunter, Green Lantern, Flash, Aquaman, Green Arrow and Plastic Man) and several Looney Tunes (consisting of: Bugs Bunny, Elmer Fudd, Porky Pig, Foghorn Leghorn, Speedy Gonzales, Pepé Le Pew, Taz, Yosemite Sam, Sylvester and Tweety) to find themselves in the same location. Discussing what has happened so far, they realize that their two realities are being merged and, when Superman mentions Mxyzptlk and Foghorn remembers meeting him, suspicions arise that he is responsible. Checking the new broadcasts, they discover a more immediate threat - three of the Toyman's deadly giant toys are attacking the Federal Reserves. The Justice League prepare to head to the rescue, but Bugs protests and convinces them to let him and the other Looney Tunes accompany them (after all, they too have done heroic things in their time). Superman appoints them honorary Justice League members.

While Mxyzptlk tries to fix the transporter, the Do-do breaks free and declares that, as he belongs in neither the Looney Tunes' world nor the DC Universe, he will instead merge the two universes forever.

=== Cwisis on Infinite Earths! ===
The Justice League and the Looney Tunes split up into three teams to take out the Toyman's machines:

Superman, Flash, Green Arrow, Elmer Fudd, Foghorn Leghorn and Pepé Le Pew encounter a tank with a cannon powerful enough to incapacitate Superman. Flash warns the Looney Tunes to stay back, but Foghorn wants to help. After hearing Fudd and Pepé argue about Pepé's smell, he comes up with "an idea so good, I wish I could steal it from myself!" They get Green Arrow to shoot an arrow Pepé is clinging onto into the tank, causing the goons inside to rapidly evacuate to escape the cartoon skunk's stench.

Batman, Green Lantern, Plastic Man, Bugs Bunny, Speedy Gonzales and Taz face a giant toy soldier that knocks Green Lantern unconscious and causes him to fall. Speedy quickly stretches Plastic Man into a safety net to rescue the Emerald Gladiator while Bugs convinces Taz to eat one of the robot's feet, causing the whole thing to fall over.

Wonder Woman, Aquaman, Martian Manhunter, Porky Pig, Yosemite Sam, Sylvester and Tweety run into a robotic dragon that easily bests Martian Manhunter with its fiery breath and grabs Wonder Woman and Aquaman. Tweety angrily flies at the dragon and finds himself inside it with the piloting goons. They ignore Tweety, believing him to be harmless, but Tweety starts pressing every button and pulling every switch that he can find, causing the dragon to shake itself to bits.

Meanwhile, Mr. Mxyzptlk tricks the Do-do into trusting him again and proceeds to tie him up a second time before embarking on the "merge the two universes forever" plan himself.

Daffy Duck, still believing he is Batman, finds the Toyman. The criminal easily convinces him to join his organization with a job offer (and a very large salary), but just as they shake on it they find themselves transported through dimensions (their hands get stuck together thanks to some superglue Daffy got himself covered in earlier). The furious Toyman prepares to shoot Daffy, but is put off the idea by the revelation that all the other Looney Tunes and the DC superheroes are all there too. After the Toyman surrenders and is arrested, Bugs and Superman start wondering how they can get everyone home before it is revealed they are all at Mxyzptlk's base. He gleefully threatens to merge the Looney Tunes' world and the DC Universe into one forever, much to the terror of the Looney Tunes (who all note how many problems the DC Universe has).

While Superman and Batman waste time wondering what to do, Bugs takes action. He pretends to congratulate Mxyzptlk, convincing him to brag of his victory by posting it on the popular website "www.kltpzyxm.com"; when Mxyzptlk says it aloud he is transported back to the Fifth Dimension. Freed, the Do-do resets the machine to separate the two universes forever, announcing he intends to stay to run amok in the DC Universe and sending the Looney Tunes home because "I don't need the competition". Superman and Bugs Bunny shake hands as they leave, the Man of Steel commenting that the Looney Tunes are real superheroes.

Back at the Daily Planet, Clark Kent reads a Looney Tunes comic and happily notes that Bugs and the others are back home before being sent on another assignment by Perry White. Perry notices that Kent has left a mysterious box on his desk and opens it out of curiosity, revealing Michigan J. Frog. Perry dreams of fame and fortune with the frog while, back in the Looney Tunes' world, Bugs reads the scene in a Superman comic and glumly foretells the disappointment that awaits Perry. Daffy wonders aloud whether people in the DC Universe would believe what has happened if they knew the truth, to which Bugs replies "Let's put it this way - they'd believe that before they'll believe what Perry White's gonna try and tell them!" as Porky signs off with his classic "Th-th-th-that's all, folks!"
