= Snowflame =

DC Comics supervillain

- Snowflame as depicted in Catwoman vol. 5 #24 (October 2020). Art by Cian Tormey (penciler/inker), FCO Plascencia (colorist), and Gabriela Downie (letterer).

Publication information
- Publisher: DC Comics
- First appearance: New Guardians #2 (October 1988)
- Created by: Steve Englehart; Cary Bates

In-story information
- Alter ego: Stefan
- Abilities: Pyrokinesis; Superhuman strength; Contact high

Snowflame is a supervillain appearing in comic books published by DC Comics. The character was created by Steve Englehart and Cary Bates to serve as a villain for the superhero team the New Guardians. In later appearances, Snowflame also fought Catwoman and Peacemaker.

== Character biography ==
=== Origins ===
Snowflame first appeared in the 1988 comic book New Guardians #2 in a story titled Jungle Snow. In it, he meets the New Guardians in Colombia as the leader of a drug cartel. In their first encounter he defeats the superhero team, but is later killed by them in a chemical shed explosion.

=== New Justice ===
In Catwoman #23, Catwoman travels to South America and encounters Snowflame, whose real name is revealed to be Stefan. Snowflame reveals that he faked his death in the chemical shed explosion to take over the island of Isla Nevada. He then escorts Catwoman to his home, where he is auctioning off expensive and dangerous artifacts to other supervillains. In Catwoman #24, Catwoman sneaks into the jungle and meets Kisin, the island's mythical giant panther and god of death, before returning to do battle with Snowflame. She defeats him with the help of Kisin.

Snowflame returns in the Dawn of DC series Peacemaker Tries Hard!, in which he fights against Peacemaker. He is defeated and seemingly killed after choking on a poison dart frog that Peacemaker snuck into his cocaine.

== Powers and abilities ==
By inhaling cocaine, Snowflame is capable of granting himself superhuman strength, speed, an immunity to pain, pyrokinesis, and the ability to give targets an instant contact high by touching them.

== In other media ==
- Snowflame appears in a fan-made webcomic created by artist Julie Sydor. This version lives in Gotham City.
- Snowflame appears in the fourth season of Harley Quinn, voiced by James Adomian. This version is a member of the Legion of Doom.
