= Floronic Man =

DC Comics character

- Floronic Man as depicted in The Flash #245 (November 1976). Art by Dick Dillin (pencils) and Terry Austin (inks).

Publication information
- Publisher: DC Comics
- First appearance: As Jason Woodrue: The Atom #1 (June–July 1962); As the Floronic Man: The Flash #245 (November 1976); As the Seeder: Swamp Thing #21 (February 1984)
- Created by: Gardner Fox; Gil Kane

In-story information
- Alter ego: Jason Woodrue
- Species: Metahuman
- Team affiliations: Injustice Gang; New Guardians; Secret Society of Super Villains
- Notable aliases: Dr. Jason Woodrue; The Plant Master; Floro; The Seeder
- Abilities: Plant manipulation; Botany expertise

Floronic Man (Jason Woodrue), also known as the Plant Master, Floro, and the Seeder, is a supervillain and antihero appearing in American comic books published by DC Comics.

The character has been portrayed in live-action by John Glover in the 1997 film Batman & Robin and Kevin Durand in the DC Universe series Swamp Thing.

== Publication history ==
He first appeared as an enemy of the Atom in The Atom #1 and was created by Gardner Fox and Gil Kane. His Floronic Man appearance first appeared in the Green Lantern backup in The Flash #245. His Seeder appearance first appeared in Swamp Thing #21. He became known as "Floro" and a superhero, in The New Guardians.

== Fictional character biography ==
Dr. Jason Woodrue first appears in The Atom #1 (June–July 1962). Woodrue is an exile from an interdimensional world (Floria) inhabited by dryads. Woodrue, sometimes called the Plant Master, uses his botanical knowledge to control plants in an attempt to take over the world. He is defeated by the superhero Atom. The Plant Master returns to face the Atom and the Justice League.

In The Flash #245 (November 1976), Woodrue uses an experimental formula to transform his body into a plant/human hybrid. His skin now resembled bark and his hair had turned into leaves. Now calling himself Floronic Man, he is defeated by Green Lantern. After a rematch with the Atom and Wonder Woman, Floronic Man later becomes a member of the Secret Society of Super-Villains.

In Swamp Thing, Woodrue is hired by General Avery Sunderland to discover how scientist Alec Holland had been turned into the Swamp Thing. Woodrue discovers that the creature, instead of being a mutated version of Holland, is rather an intelligent mass of plant life that fed on Holland's dead body and absorbed his knowledge and memories. Floronic Man tries to warn Sunderland that the Swamp Thing is not dead, but Sunderland refuses to listen and announces his intent to terminate Woodrue's employment. Subsequently, Floronic Man traps Sunderland in his office with a thawed and enraged Swamp Thing, who kills him.

Floronic Man uses Swamp Thing's body to contact the Green, which is composed of the life force of all plants on Earth. The experience drives Floronic Man insane; he refers to himself as "Wood-Rue", and sets out to destroy all non-plant life on Earth by forcing the plants to produce an excess amount of oxygen to force humans and animals into extinction, in the belief that he is "saving" Earth from mankind. Woodrue is confronted by a revived Swamp Thing, who reveals to the Green that plants cannot survive without humans and animals, as his actions would deprive them of the carbon dioxide that they require to breathe that comes from humans and animals, forcing Woodrue to acknowledge that his actions are the actions of a man rather than a plant. The Green abandons Floronic Man, who is then taken into custody by the Justice League after undergoing a complete mental breakdown.

The 1988 Neil Gaiman/Dave McKean miniseries Black Orchid reveals that Jason Woodrue was previously a university professor and taught botany to Philip Sylvian, Alec Holland, and Pamela Isley. The character Philip Sylvian, apparently unaware of Woodrue's transformation, refers to him as a "poor old guy" and states: "Last I heard he was in Arkham Insane Asylum...".

Following the events of Millennium, Woodrue briefly joins the New Guardians under the name Floro. After the death of most of his teammates, he reverts to his original status as a villain.

Poison Ivy and Floronic Man as depicted in Batman: Shadow of the Bat #57 (December 1996). Art by Dave Taylor.

Floronic Man returns in Batman: Shadow of the Bat #56 (November 1996). After breaking Poison Ivy out of Arkham with his two underlings Holly and Eva, Floronic Man explains his past to Batman and Poison Ivy, telling the story of how he prevented a plot of Swamp Thing's, only to be killed soon afterward. After scientists manage to keep his head alive, the first thing he comes in contact with is marijuana. Regenerating a plant body, he aims to flood Gotham with marijuana. Floronic Man takes some of Poison Ivy's DNA in an attempt to create a "child". Poison Ivy, in exchange, gets a trunk full of dope money, and is free to walk away. Deciding that she does not want Floronic Man running the world, she frees the Batman. After a short battle, the Batman notices that Floronic Man is standing in a puddle, and uses an electrical cable to electrocute the villain, killing him once again.

The character has since appeared in various other comics and storylines. He assists Starman, Alan Scott, Batman, and others in trying to save Solomon Grundy. In a later issue of Batman, he is killed after assassins shoot him repeatedly with bullets. He is one of the many villains who was mind-wiped by the JLA, but he has since recovered those memories.

In Infinite Crisis, Floronic Man appears as a member of Alexander Luthor Jr.'s Secret Society of Super Villains and takes part in the Battle of Metropolis.

In the post-Infinite Crisis DC universe, Woodrue is responsible for Pamela Isley's transformation into Poison Ivy.

In 2011, "The New 52" rebooted the DC universe. Woodrue is re-introduced making a deal with the Green by taking care of Alec Holland. Woodrue is later revealed to be the Seeder, now endowed with power by the Parliament of Trees. The Swamp Thing had been hunting him for disrupting the balance of the Green. The Parliament of Trees decides that he and the Swamp Thing must fight, once they have fully realized their powers, to decide who shall be the champion of the Green. As he did in his previous incarnation, he briefly takes the powers of the Swamp Thing, becoming the Champion of the Green, before the Swamp Thing tricks him from within the Green and steals back the title, which nearly kills the Seeder, until the Swamp Thing places him within the Green to save him. He later re-emerges to fight alongside the Swamp Thing against the combined forces of the Metal, the Gray/Fungi and the Rot. He fights the Avatar of the Gray, resulting in both of their deaths.

In the series Poison Ivy, Floronic Man is revealed to have survived. Shortly afterward, he is killed by Harley Quinn using a flamethrower.

== Powers and abilities ==
In his original form, Jason Woodrue has advanced knowledge of botany, which he utilizes to accelerate plant growth. As Floronic Man, Woodrue can merge with and control plants.

== Other versions ==
An alternate timeline variant of Jason Woodrue appears in Flashpoint Beyond. This version has become Swamp Thing and created an oasis to accommodate refugees and repent for his previous crimes.

== In other media ==
=== Television ===
- A character loosely based on Jason Woodrue as Plant Master named Straal appears in The Superman/Aquaman Hour of Adventure episode "The Plant Master", voiced by Ted Knight. He is a scientist who discovered a way to use wave patterns to increase plant growth.
- Jason Woodrue appears in Swamp Thing, portrayed by Kevin Durand. This version seeks to use the properties of Marais, Louisiana's swamp to cure his wife Carolyn's Alzheimer's disease. After learning of the eponymous Swamp Thing, Woodrue collects and eats some of his plant matter before attempting to force Carolyn to do the same, only to be interrupted by Abby Arcane and the Marais Police Department. Woodrue later experiments on himself and transforms into Floronic Man.
- Jason Woodrue as Floronic Man appears in the fifth season of Harley Quinn, voiced by John Slattery. This version is a botany professor who pursued an affair with his student Pamela Isley, during which he turned her into Poison Ivy via a chemical spill in a failed attempt at killing her after trying to steal her research to claim as his own. In the present, she seeks revenge on him by exposing him to similar chemicals, only to unknowingly turn him into Floronic Man.

=== Film ===
Jason Woodrue as depicted in Batman & Robin.

- Jason Woodrue appears in Batman & Robin, portrayed by John Glover. This version is a Wayne Enterprises scientist who operates in the Amazon rainforest and uses plant toxins to create a super-soldier serum called "Venom". While experimenting on Bane, Woodrue's assistant Pamela Isley discovers his criminal nature. He shoves her into a shelf of chemicals in an attempt to kill her, but she transforms into Poison Ivy, kills him with a poisonous kiss, and escapes with Bane.
- Floronic Man was reportedly featured in David S. Goyer's unproduced script Green Arrow: Escape from Super Max as an inmate of the titular metahuman prison.
- Floronic Man was planned to appear in Guillermo del Toro's Justice League Dark.
- Jason Woodrue as Floronic Man appears in Batman and Harley Quinn, voiced by Kevin Michael Richardson.

=== Video games ===
Jason Woodrue as Floronic Man appears as a character summon in Scribblenauts Unmasked: A DC Comics Adventure.

=== Miscellaneous ===
Jason Woodrue as Floronic Man appears in Justice League Adventures #6.
