= New Guardians =

Comic book and DC Comics superhero team

- The New Guardians, art by Joe Staton.

Publication information
- Publisher: DC Comics
- First appearance: Millennium #1 (January 1988)
- Created by: Steve Engelhart (writer); Joe Staton (artist)

In-story information
- Base(s): Mobile
- Member(s): Betty Clawman; Extraño; Floronic Man; Gloss; Harbinger; Jet; Ram; Thomas Kalmaku

The New Guardians are a DC Comics superhero team featured in the short-lived eponymous series The New Guardians. It was a spin-off from the Millennium event and ran for twelve issues, from 1988 through 1989, before being canceled. The characters first appeared in Millennium #1, (January 1988), written by Steve Engelhart and drawn by Joe Staton. The series has since gained infamy among comic fans due to its poor writing and second issue, which features "Snowflame", a supervillain who gained powers from the use of cocaine.

== History ==
The New Guardians, who were also initially known as the Chosen, were a group of people selected by a Guardian of the Universe named Herupa Hando Hu and a Zamaron named Nadia Safir in the DC Comics crossover Millennium. These "Chosen" were then given powers by their selectors.

Members of the Chosen were selected from several nationalities to form a superhero group representative of the entire human race.

=== Original members ===
- Betty Clawman - An Aboriginal Australian woman, Clawman gained psychic abilities derived from the aboriginal Dreamtime.
- Extraño - A Peruvian magician, male, Extraño was among the first openly gay characters in comics.
- Floronic Man - Originally a supervillain with power over plants, Floronic Man was briefly a member of the Global Guardians.
- Gloss - A Chinese woman who channels the mystic ley lines, giving her a variety of earth-based abilities. She later joined the Global Guardians, where she remained a member until she was killed by Prometheus. Gloss returned following The New 52 continuity reboot.
- Harbinger - An agent of the Monitor, Harbinger possessed the powers of flight, self-replication and energy blasts. Keeper of the histories of the multiverse, Harbinger died in the pages of Superman/Batman. Donna Troy has since taken up her mantle.
- Jet - An English girl who could manipulate electromagnetic fields to a variety of effects. She was infected with HIV after being bitten by the Hemogoblin, a vampire with AIDS. After apparently giving her life to fend off an alien invasion, Jet is now alive again and leading the Global Guardians.
- Ram - Formerly a Japanese man, now a being of silicon and electronics, Ram was physically durable and also had the ability to communicate with electrical equipment over great distances (such as satellites in orbit). He was reportedly killed during a battle in Roulette's casino.
- Thomas Kalmaku - An Inuk friend of Hal Jordan's, Tom originally turned down the Guardian's offer of advancement, but later developed the super power to "bring out the best in people". He subsequently left the team and has shown no further signs of possessing such powers.

== Green Lantern: New Guardians ==
Green Lantern: New Guardians is an American comic book series written by Tony Bedard with art by Tyler Kirkham and Batt and published by DC Comics.

The team is made up of a representative of each of the Corps that tap into a particular portion of the emotional spectrum; its members are Kyle Rayner (Green Lantern Corps), Arkillo (Sinestro Corps), Bleez (Red Lantern Corps), Glomulus (Orange Lantern Corps), Munk (Indigo Tribe), Saint Walker (Blue Lantern Corps), and Fatality (Star Sapphires).

An earlier version of the team, consisting of Hal Jordan, Carol Ferris, Sinestro, Atrocitus, Larfleeze, Saint Walker, and Indigo-1, was seen during the Brightest Day story arc in Green Lantern.
