= Joe Staton =

American comics artist and writer (born 1948)

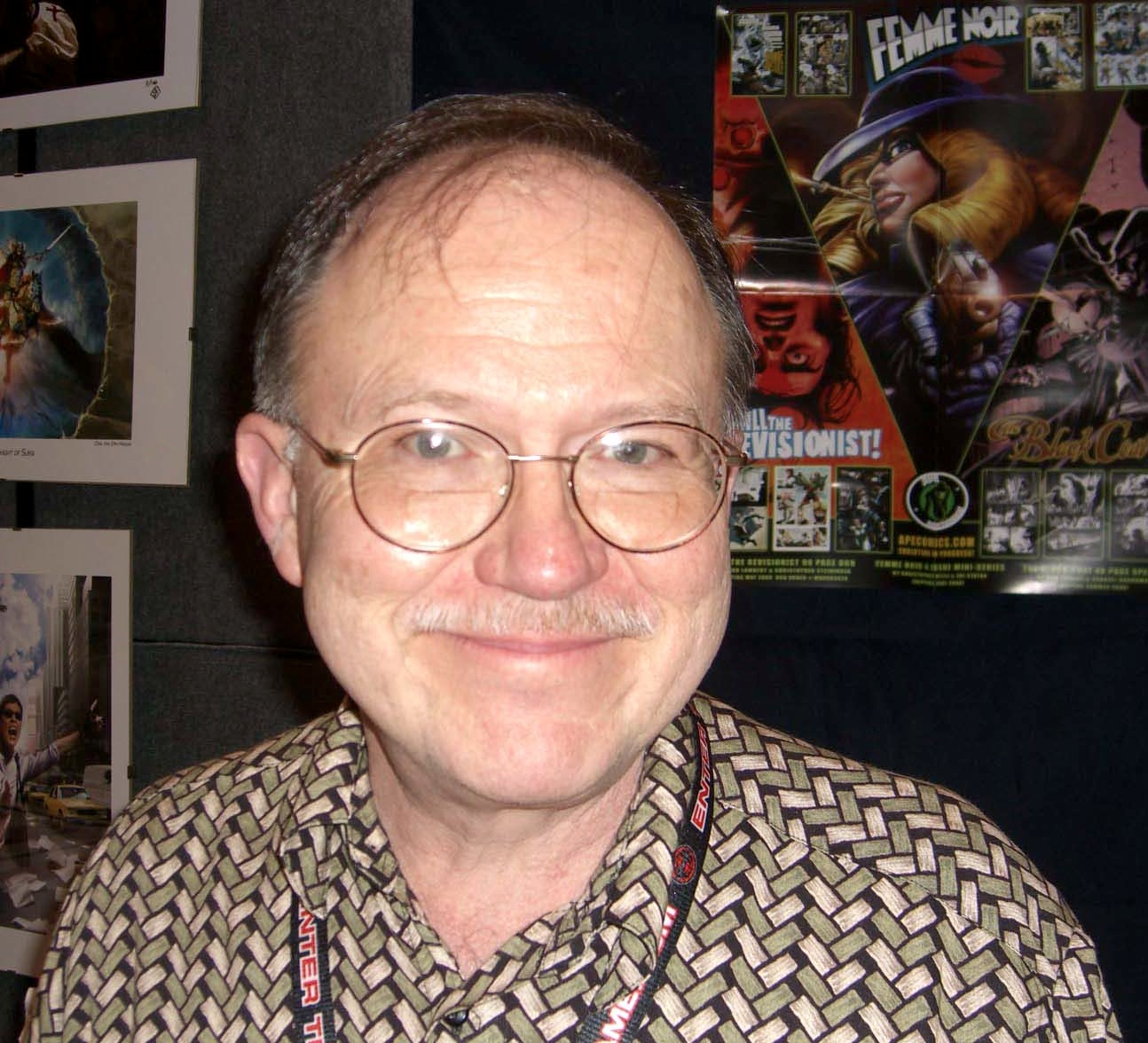
- Staton at the 2008 New York Comic Con
- Born: January 19, 1948 (age 78) North Carolina, U.S.
- Areas: Writer, Penciller, Inker
- Notable works: Dick Tracy; E-Man; Green Lantern Corps; Guy Gardner; Huntress
- Awards: Inkpot Award 1983; Eisner Award 1998; Harvey Award 2013, 2014, 2015; Inkwell Awards 2026 Stacey Aragon Special Recognition Award (SASRA)

Joe Staton (/ˈsteɪtən/; born January 19, 1948) is an American comics artist and writer. He co-created the Bronze Age Huntress (Helena Wayne), as well as the third Huntress (Helena Bertinelli), Kilowog and the Omega Men for DC Comics. He was the artist of the Dick Tracy comic strip from 2011 to October 2021.

== Early life ==
Joe Staton grew up in Tennessee and graduated from Murray State University in 1970.

== Career ==
Staton started his comics career at Charlton Comics in 1971 and gained notability as the artist of the super-hero series E-Man. Staton produced art for various comics published by Charlton, Marvel Comics, and Warren Publishing during the 1970s.

Hired initially by Roy Thomas to work for Marvel, Staton was then recruited by Paul Levitz to work on DC Comics' revival of the Justice Society of America in All Star Comics and later Adventure Comics. In these titles he illustrated stories including the origin of the JSA in DC Special #29 and the death of the Earth-Two Batman. Staton also illustrated the solo adventures of two female JSA members created during the JSA revival – drawing Power Girl in Showcase and the Huntress. During that time, Staton additionally drew Superboy and the Legion of Super-Heroes, the 1970s revival of the Doom Patrol in Showcase, and the Metal Men. In 1979, Staton began a two-and-a-half-year run on Green Lantern, during which he co-created the Omega Men with writer Marv Wolfman.

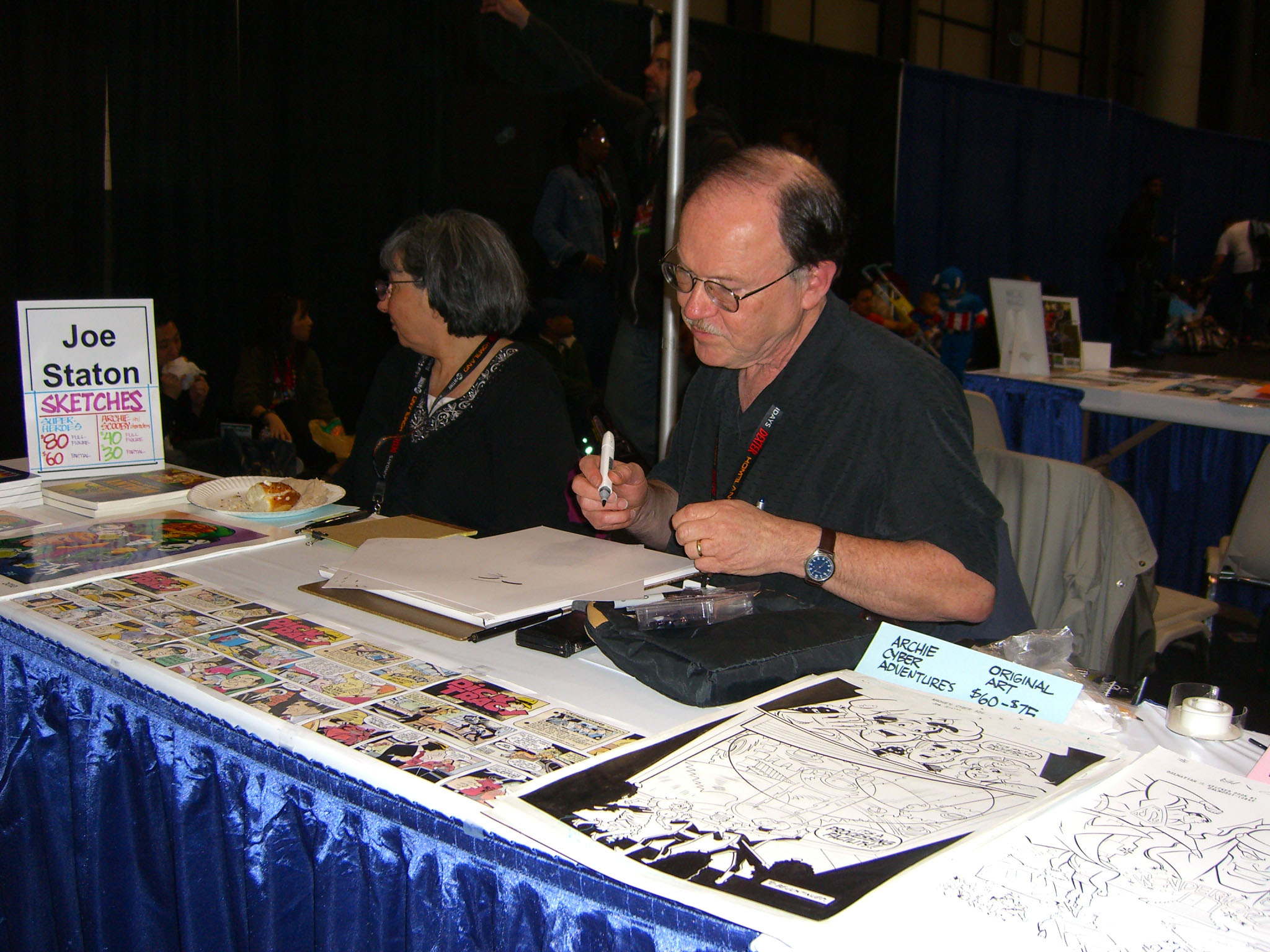
Staton sketching at the 2011 New York Comic Con

Staton served as art director for First Comics for three years in the 1980s. He returned to DC Comics afterwards for a second run on Green Lantern and with writer Steve Englehart, oversaw the title's name change to Green Lantern Corps. Staton and Englehart also created the DC weekly crossover series Millennium (Jan.–Feb. 1988). Staton was one of the contributors to the DC Challenge limited series in 1986. In addition, he illustrated Guy Gardner, The Huntress, The New Guardians, and Superman & Bugs Bunny.

In the early 1990s, Staton provided the artwork on the Mike Danger Sunday comic strip, written by Max Allan Collins. From the late 90s to the late 2000s, Staton drew DC's Scooby-Doo title for younger readers, as well as the more mature-themed Femme Noir for Ape Entertainment. On January 19, 2011, Tribune Media Services announced that Staton and writer Mike Curtis would replace Dick Locher as the creative team of the Dick Tracy comic strip. The new creative team has worked together on Scooby-Doo, Richie Rich, and Casper the Friendly Ghost and started on March 14, 2011. He pencilled DC Retroactive: Green Lantern – The '80s #1, written by Len Wein, published the same year. Staton also illustrated Charles Santino's graphic novel adaptation of Ayn Rand's Anthem (2011).

== Awards ==
Joe Staton received an Inkpot Award in 1983.

Staton and writer Mike Curtis received the Best Syndicated Strip Harvey Award for Dick Tracy in 2013, 2014, and 2015.

In 2026, Staton was awarded the Inkwell Awards Stacey Aragon Special Recognition Award (SASRA).

== Bibliography ==
=== AC Comics ===
- Femforce #121 (Femme Noir) (2003)

=== Alpha Productions ===
- The Detectives #1 (Michael Mauser, Private Eye) (1993)
- E-Man #1 (1993)
- E-Man Returns #1 (1994)

=== Ape Entertainment ===
- Ape Entertainment's Cartoonapalooza #2 (Femme Noir) (2009)
- Femme Noir: The Dark City Diaries #1–4 (2008)

=== Apple Press ===
- ElfQuest: Siege at Blue Mountain #1–5 (inker) (1987–1988)
- The New Crime Files of Michael Mauser, Private Eye #1 (1992)

=== Archie Comics ===
- Archie & Friends Double Digest Magazine #1–5 (2011)
- Archie's Super Teens #1 (1994)
- Jughead's Double Digest #139–142 (2008)

=== Bill Spicer ===
- Fantasy Illustrated #2 (1964)

=== Caliber Press ===
- Dominique: Protect and Serve #1 (1995)
- Negative Burn #18, 20, 33, 49 (1995–1997)

=== Century Comics For Action Hero ===
- Actor Comics Presents #1 (2006)

=== CFD Productions ===
- Noir #2 (Michael Mauser, Private Eye) (1995)

=== Charlton Comics ===
- Charlton Bullseye #4 (E-Man) (1976)
- E-Man #1–10 (1973–1975)
- Ghost Manor #5–6, 10, 13 (1972–1973)
- Ghostly Haunts #28, 32, 35–36 (1972–1973)
- Ghostly Tales #104, 117 (1973–1975)
- Haunted #11–12, 18, 21–22, 26 (1973–1976)
- Haunted Love #1–5 (1973)
- I Love You #91, 110 (1971–1975)
- Love and Romance #6 (1972)
- Love Diary #79, 88 (1972–1974)
- The Many Ghosts of Dr. Graves #30, 36–37, 41, 43, 47 (1972–1974)
- Midnight Tales #1–11, 13–14 (1972–1975)
- Monster Hunters #1 (1975)
- Primus #1–7 (1972)
- Scary Tales #1, 4 (1975–1976)
- Secret Romance #21 (1972)
- The Six Million Dollar Man #1–6 (1976–1978)
- Space 1999 #1–3, 5 (1975–1976)
- Sweethearts #133 (1973)
- Teen-Age Love #87 (1972)
- Teen Confessions #78 (1973)
- Vengeance Squad #1–6 (Michael Mauser, Private Eye) (1975–1976)
- Wheelie and the Chopper Bunch #1, 4–5 (1975–1976)

=== Charlton Neo ===
- Paul Kupperberg's Secret Romances #2 (2015)
- The Charlton Arrow vol. 2 #1–3 (E-Man) (2017–2018)

=== Comico ===
- E-Man #1–3 (1989–1990)
- Johnny Quest #2 (inker), #11 (penciller) (1986–1987)
- Maze Agency #6 (1989)

=== CPL/GANG Publications ===
- The Charlton Bullseye #4 (E-Man) (1976)

=== CrossGen ===
- Crossovers #7–9 (2003)

=== Dark Horse ===
- Michael Chabon Presents: The Amazing Adventures of the Escapist #2 (2004)

=== DC Comics ===
- 9-11: The World's Finest Comic Book Writers & Artists Tell Stories to Remember, Vol. 2 (2002)
- Action Comics #525–526, 531, 535–536 (1981–1982)
- Adventure Comics #445–447 (inker); #456–478 (penciller) (1976–1980)
- All-Star Comics #66–74 (1977–1978)
- Batman #334 (1981)
- Batman 80-Page Giant #3 (2000)
- Batman & Superman Adventures: World's Finest #1 (1997)
- Batman and Robin Adventures #17, 21, Annual #2 (1997)
- Batman and Robin Adventures: Sub-Zero #1 (1998)
- Batman Beyond #4–6 (1999)
- Batman Chronicles #15 (1999)
- Batman Family #18–20 (Huntress) (1978)
- Batman: Blackgate #1 (1997)
- Batman: Death of Innocents #1 (1996)
- Batman: Gotham Adventures #29 (2000)
- Batman: Legends of the Dark Knight #65–68, Annual #4 (1994–1995)
- Batman: Penguin Triumphant #1 (1992)
- Batman: Shadow of the Bat #14–15, 42, Annual #2 (1993–1995)
- Batman: Two-Face Strikes Twice #1–2 (1993)
- Blackhawk #271 (1984)
- Brave & the Bold #148, 197 (1979, 1983)
- DC Challenge #7 (1986)
- DC Comics Presents #9–11, 15–16, 21, 23, 39, 96 (1979–1981, 1986)
- DC Retroactive: Green Lantern – The '80s #1 (2011)
- DC Special #29 (1977)
- DC Special Series #10 (Doctor Fate) (1978)
- DC Super Friends #2 (2008)
- DC Super Stars #17 (Huntress) (1977)
- DCU Holiday Bash #3 (1998)
- Doctor Fate #21 (1990)
- Family Man #1–3 (1995)
- Green Lantern vol. 2 #123–155, 188–205 (1979–1982, 1985–1986)
- Green Lantern vol. 3 #9–13, 18–19, 25 (1991–1992)
- Green Lantern Corps #206–217, 221–222 (1986–1988)
- Green Lantern Corps Quarterly #1 (1992)
- Green Lantern Secret Files #2 (1999)
- Gross Point #2, 4–7, 9–12 (1997–1998)
- Guy Gardner #1–14, 44, Annual #2 (1992–1993, 1996)
- Guy Gardner Reborn #1–3 (1992)
- Heroes Against Hunger #1 (inker) (1986)
- House of Mystery #300 (1982)
- Huntress #1–19 (1989–1990)
- Karate Kid #1–9 (inker) (1976–1977)
- Justice League Adventures #7 (2002)
- Justice League of America #244 (1985)
- Justice League International Special #2 (1991)
- Legion of Superheroes #259–260 (1980)
- The Life Story of the Flash HC (with Gil Kane) (1998)
- Looney Tunes #140 (2006)
- Metal Men #50–56 (1977–1978)
- Millennium #1–8 (1988)
- Mystery in Space #113 (1980)
- New Guardians #1–9 (1988–1989)
- Outsiders #4 (Metamorpho story) (1986)
- Power Company: Skyrocket #1 (2002)
- Power of Shazam #19 (1996)
- Secret Origins #36, 50 (1989–1990)
- Scooby-Doo #3, 5, 10–14, 16–23, 26–39, 41–48, 50, 52–67, 69, 71, 73–75, 77–78, 80–89, 91, 93, 95–100, 102–107, 109, 111–112, 119, 125–126, 143, 158 (#16 also writer) (1997–2010)
- Showcase #94–96 (Doom Patrol); #97–99 (Power Girl); #100 (1977–1978)
- Showcase '95 #10 (1995)
- Superboy and the Legion of Superheroes #227, 243–249, 252–258 (1976, 1978–1979)
- Superman & Bugs Bunny #1–4 (2000)
- Superman Adventures #41, Annual #1 (1997, 2000)
- Superman Adventures: Dimension of the Dark Shadows #1 (promo) (1998)
- Superman Family #191–194 (Superboy) (1978–1979)
- Super Friends #43, 45 (Plastic Man) (1981)
- Tales of the Green Lantern Corps #1–3 (1981)
- Who's Who: The Definitive Directory of the DC Universe #3–4, 7 (1985)
- Wonder Woman #241; #271–287, 289–290, 294–299 (Huntress feature) (1978, 1980–1983)
- World's Finest Comics #262, 273 (1980–1981)

=== Digital Webbing ===
- E-Man Recharged #1 (2006)
- E-Man: Course of the Idol oneshot (2009)
- E-Man: Dolly #1 (2007)
- Digital Webbing Jam 2007 oneshot (E-Man) (2007)

=== Disney ===
- Disney Adventures #4 (1997)

=== EC ===
- Mad #340 (1995)

=== Eclipse Comics ===
- Destroyer Duck #1 (1982)

=== First Comics ===
- American Flagg! #28–32, 39–40 (1986–1987)
- Badger Goes Berserk #3 (1989)
- Crossroads #3 (1988)
- E-Man #1–25 (#9, 11–23 also writer) (1983–1985)
- Gift #1 (1990)
- Grimjack #5, 33 (1984, 1987)
- Meta-4 #3 (inker) (1991)
- P.I.'s: Michael Mauser and Ms. Tree #1–3 (1984–1985)
- Warp #1 (inker) (1983)

=== Hamilton Comics ===
- Captain Cosmos, The Last Starveyer #0 (1997)
- Grave Tales #1–3 (1991–1992)
- Maggots #1, 3 (1991–1992)

=== Innovation Comics ===
- Maze Agency Special #1 (1990)

=== IPC ===
- 2000 AD and Tornado #133 (1979)

=== Kitchen Sink Press ===
- The Spirit #30 (penciller, two pages) (1981)

=== Malibu Comics ===
- Dinosaurs for Hire #8 (1993)
- Prime #21 (1995)

=== Marvel Comics ===
- The Amazing Spider-Man #150 (layouts, with Gil Kane) (1975)
- Avengers #127–134 (1974–1975)
- Avengers: Celestial Quest #7 (2002)
- The Deadly Hands of Kung Fu #28, 31–32 (1976–1977)
- Fallen Angels #5–6, 8 (1987)
- Fred Hembeck Destroys the Marvel Universe #1 (inker, with Vince Colletta) (1989)
- Incredible Hulk #187–189, 191–209 (inker) (1974–1977)
- Justice #4 (1987)
- Marvel Comics Presents #74 (1991)
- Marvel Fanfare #39, 50 (1988, 1990)
- Silver Surfer vol. 3 #11, 13–14, Annual #1 (1988)
- Toxic Crusaders #2, 4 (1992)
- Vampire Tales #8 (1974)
- What The--?! #21–22 (1992)

=== Ni-Cola Productions ===
- Captain Cosmos, The Last Starveyer #2, 4 (2001–2006)

=== Penguin (New American Library) ===
- Anthem GN (2011)

=== Star*Reach ===
- Star*Reach #5–7 (1976–1977)

=== Topps Comics ===
- Exosquad #0 (1994)
- Return to Jurassic Park #1–4 (1995)

=== TSR Comics ===
- Intruder Comic Module #7-8, 10 (1991)

=== Warren Publishing ===
- Creepy #42, 136 (1971, 1982)

=== Wonderful Publishing Company ===
- Witzend #10 (1976)

=== Ybor City Publishers ===
- Captain Cosmos, The Last Starveyer #1 (1998)

Preceded by Wally Wood	All Star Comics penciller 1977–1978	Succeeded by n/a
Preceded by Don Heck	Green Lantern penciller 1979–1982	Succeeded by Gil Kane
Preceded by Bill Willingham	Green Lantern/Green Lantern Corps penciller 1985–1988	Succeeded by Gil Kane
