= Nathaniel Dusk =

- Advertisement for the 1985 miniseries, drawn by Gene Colan

Publication information
- Publisher: DC Comics
- First appearance: Nathaniel Dusk #1 (February 1984)
- Created by: Don McGregor; Gene Colan

Nathaniel Dusk is a private investigator and the title character of two four-issue comic book miniseries published by DC Comics in 1984 and 1985. Don McGregor wrote both series and Gene Colan provided the pencils.

== Creation ==
McGregor has said that he based Dusk on characters played by actor Robert Culp. He was watching I Spy, a series starring Culp, when the idea for the character came to him.

== Fictional character biography ==
Dusk works in New York City in the 1930s. He served in the United States Armed Forces in World War I and then joined the New York City Police Department. He falls in love with Joyce Gulino, a saleswoman with two children, Jennie and Anthony. Her ex-husband, the gangster Joseph Costilino, later kills the family.

In the DC Universe, the 2017–2019 miniseries Doomsday Clock by Geoff Johns and Gary Frank presents Nathaniel Dusk as a film noir character played by the fictional actor Carver Colman. In 1954 Colman is found bludgeoned to death with the award he had won. Colman was the first actor Doctor Manhattan met after arriving in the DC Universe, and he served as an "anchor" while Manhattan adjusted to life there.

== In other media ==
=== Television ===
- In the third season of Stargirl, several movies starring Dusk are advertised at a movie theater.

== Collected editions ==
- DC Through the 80s: The Experiments (includes Nathaniel Dusk #1, 504 pages, May 2021, ISBN 978-1-77950-709-9)
