= Secret Empire (1974 comic) =

Marvel Comics storyline

- Captain America renounces his title on the cover of Captain America and the Falcon #176
- Publisher: Marvel Comics
- Publication date: January – August 1974
- Genre: Superhero, conspiracy
Title(s)
Captain America and the Falcon #169–176
- Main characters: Captain America; Secret Empire

Creative team
- Writers: Steve Englehart (plot & script); Mike Friedrich (script)
- Artist: Sal Buscema
- Inkers: Vince Colletta; Frank McLaughlin
- Letterers: Charlotte Jetter; Artie Simek
- Colorists: Michelle Brand; Petra Goldberg; Linda Lessmann; George Roussos
- Editor: Roy Thomas

"Secret Empire" is a story arc that ran from January to August 1974 in Captain America and the Falcon, an American comic book series published by Marvel Comics. It was written by Steve Englehart with additional scriptwork by Mike Friedrich, and drawn by Sal Buscema. The comic follows the superhero Captain America as he uncovers a conspiracy to discredit him perpetrated by the Secret Empire, which extends to the heights of the American presidency.

Englehart conceived of "Secret Empire" as an allegory for the Watergate scandal, and sought to examine how that event would have a disillusioning effect on Captain America's belief in an idealized America. The storyline was a critical success, with praise offered for its political content, though more recent reviews have noted how its typically 1970s comic book dialogue likely reads as aged to a modern audience. "Secret Empire" has been cited as an example of how comic books reflect the political conditions under which they are produced, and is credited with introducing the tension between America as it idealizes itself to be and America as it exists in reality as a perennial theme in stories featuring Captain America.

== Synopsis ==
Captain America (Steve Rogers) is targeted by an attack ad campaign organized by the conservative special interest group "The Committee to Regain America's Principles", (Note: The implied acronym "CRAP" is never used within the text of the comic itself.) which uses deceptive claims and footage to present him as unaccountable to legal institutions and a menace to civilians. As public opinion turns against him, he discovers that the committee is a front for the Secret Empire – a splinter from the neo-Nazi terrorist group Hydra – which, under the leadership of the mysterious "Number One", seeks to discredit Captain America as part of a conspiracy to assume control of the United States government. In a climactic battle at the White House, Captain America pursues Number One to the Oval Office. His plot foiled, Number One unmasks to reveal himself to be the president of the United States, and commits suicide. (Note: While Number One's face is never revealed on-panel, he is strongly implied to be then-incumbent president Richard Nixon.) Shaken by the realization that political corruption in America extends to the heights of the presidency, a disillusioned Rogers renounces the mantle of Captain America.

== Development ==
=== Context ===
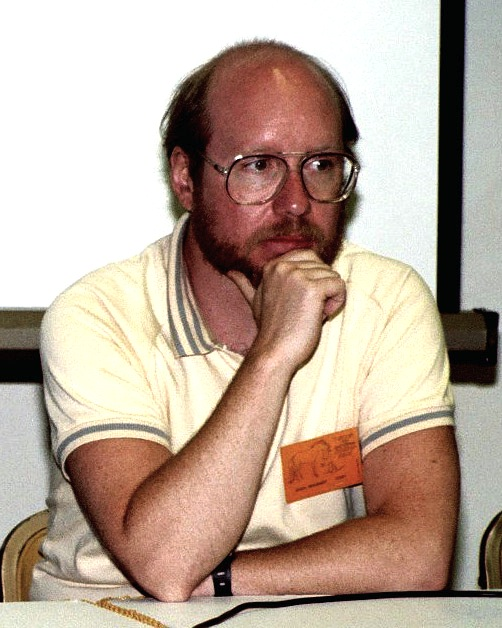
"Secret Empire" author Steve Englehart (pictured 1982)

Writer Steve Englehart assumed authorship of the comic book series Captain America starting with issue #153 in 1972. Captain America was at the time facing cancellation due to low sales, which Marvel editor Tom Brevoort attributed to a political climate characterized by public opposition to the Vietnam War and a general perception among readers that characters such as Captain America who "had the seeming [image] of being pro-establishment" were "out of step". Contemporaneously, Marvel publisher Stan Lee was pulling back in his role of running the day-to-day operations of Marvel, resulting in writers for the company operating with increasing autonomy. Englehart was given wide license by his editor Roy Thomas for Captain America who, according to Englehart, told him that his sole expectations for the series were that "you have to turn it in on time and you have to make it sell".

Englehart sought to examine what he saw as the contradiction between Captain America's persona as a 1940s patriotic wartime superhero and the political realities of America in the 1970s. To this end, he shifted Captain America away from stories focused on supervillains and towards those focused on real-life domestic social issues, such as poverty, racism, and political corruption. The shift resulted in a critical and commercial reversal of fortune for the series, and six issues into Englehart's run, Captain America had become one of Marvel's top-selling titles.

=== Production ===
"It seemed to me that if Cap existed, which was how I approached all my characters, then [he] couldn’t fight the Yellow Claw or Doctor Faustus while the president of the United States was being brought to justice. So I turned my storyline toward a version of the day’s events."

– Steve Englehart

As the Watergate scandal intensified, Englehart felt obliged to address the issue in Captain America, stating that "I was writing a man who believed in America’s highest ideals at a time when America's president was a crook. I could not ignore that." Englehart was particularly compelled by the intensity of the press coverage of the scandal, likening it to an "epic movie unfolding day by day", and elected to write "Secret Empire" as an allegory for Watergate and its coverage in the media. Noting that a "story about people breaking into a campaign office [...] would make a pretty boring comic book", he instead elected to reconfigure the scandal's core element of political corruption, with a focus on Captain America coming "to terms with the stark fact that America in practice is different from the ideals of America."

Several aspects of the story are lifted directly from Nixon's political career: the Committee to Regain America's Principles ("CRAP") was a reference to Nixon's Committee to Re-Elect the President (disparagingly referred to as "CREEP"), and the leader of CRAP was based on top Nixon aide H. R. Haldeman. As issues of Captain America were written three months in advance of their publication date, Englehart was limited in the extent to which he could comment on Watergate in realtime. "Secret Empire" would ultimately conclude before Watergate was resolved, though the decision to have Number One commit suicide at the story's climax was based on Englehart's belief that "the conclusion [to the scandal] seemed obvious". Englehart sought a "really shocking ending" that could lead into the subsequent storyline of Rogers' decision to give up the mantle of Captain America, stating that "Nixon didn’t blow his brains out, but he destroyed his own career and that's political suicide." While there was frequent speculation that Englehart was pressured by Marvel into not explicitly revealing that Number One was Nixon, he stated that it was at his own discretion that the character's identity was left ambiguous, but qualified that "no one in that time and place could be unaware of my point."

Beyond Englehart, the creative team for "Secret Empire" included Sal Buscema, who served as the artist for the series. Mike Friedrich is credited for the script for the second half of the story's first issue, the scripts for the entirety of the subsequent two issues, and is given the special credit of "Amigo" for the fourth issue. Vincent Colletta and Frank McLaughlin served as inkers; Petra Goldberg, Linda Lessmann, Michelle Brand, and George Roussos are credited as colorists; and Charlotte Jetter and Artie Simek served as letterers.

=== Releases ===
"Secret Empire" was serialized in Captain America and the Falcon from issue #169 (cover dated January 1974) to #176 (August 1974). These issues have been anthologized several times by Marvel, including as a trade paperback published on December 28, 2005 that was re-printed on March 29, 2017.

== Reception ==
=== Legacy and impact ===
As a result of the events of "Secret Empire", Steve Rogers abandons the title of Captain America and adopts the superhero identity of "Nomad, the man without a country". While this change lasted for only four issues of Captain America, comics scholar Jason Dittmer notes how these issues, in which Rogers travels across the United States from coast to coast, were significant in their emphasis on "a different relationship between the hero and the polity". "Secret Empire" also contains the first appearance of The Falcon's (Sam Wilson) flying suit, which is given to him by the superhero Black Panther.

"Secret Empire" has been cited in scholarship as an example of how comic books reflect the political conditions under which they are produced. Writing for The Journal of Popular Culture, Andrew and Virginia MacDonald note how the storyline represented a "metamorphosis" for Captain America, moving away from his wartime roots as a character "who knew the Nazis were rotten and where his duty lay" to a figure who comes to realize that "America is not the single entity we all once thought it was". For the titular Secret Empire, the storyline represented what comics scholar David Walton described as a transformation from "one of Marvel's clichéd, subversive organizations into a metaphor for government transparency", representing "the invisible merger of private, corporate, and political interests".

Disillusionment and the tension between America as it idealizes itself to be and America as it exists in reality have become perennial themes in stories featuring Captain America, notably the Captain America films of the Marvel Cinematic Universe (MCU). MCU producer Nate Moore specifically cited "Secret Empire" as inspiration for the 2025 film Captain America: Brave New World.

Marvel published a crossover storyline with the same name in 2017, though its plot bears no resemblance to the 1974 "Secret Empire".

=== Critical reception ===
According to Englehart, reader reaction to "Secret Empire" was largely positive. The political content of the story has been the subject of praise, with Kieran Shiach of Polygon describing "Secret Empire" as "one of the most politically resonant superhero stories of all time". MacDonald and MacDonald wrote that the political shifts the series represented constituted more than a "switch in politics by a corporation anxious to pander to the prejudices of its audience. The writers have clearly tried to identify and articulate the feelings about patriotism and succeeding generations of Americans" and "accurately caught the changing moods of the past thirty years". Further, they noted that while the story "may be casually dismissed by elitist critics who sneer at the necessarily shallow and simplified comic book genre [...] it is fair to say that many more Americans know about Cap than about Richard Hofstadter".

Retrospective reviews of "Secret Empire" have acknowledged the somewhat dated nature of the story's dialogue, with Shiach describing it as "as comic-booky as they come" and Matthew Peterson of Major Spoilers writing that "Secret Empire" is "all very 70's, and by today's standards awkward, but the story is still a quick and entertaining read". Mike Avila of Syfy wrote that "some elements of the story have certainly aged more gracefully than others, but it remains a great time capsule [...] of the disenchantment that permeated in large sections of America during the tail end of the Vietnam War."
