= Avengers: Celestial Quest =

- Cover to Avengers: Celestial Quest #3

Publication information
- Publisher: Marvel Comics
- Schedule: Monthly
- Format: Limited series
- Genre: Superhero
- Publication date: November 2001 – June 2002
- No. of issues: 8
- Main character(s): Mantis; Scarlet Witch; Vision; Thor; Silverclaw; Haywire

Creative team
- Written by: Steve Englehart
- Penciller: Jorge Santamaria
- Inker: Scott Hanna

Avengers: Celestial Quest is an eight-issue comic book limited series published from November 2001 to June 2002 by Marvel Comics. The series was written by Steve Englehart and drawn by Jorge Santamaria.

== Plot summary ==
Thanos decides to hunt down and kill fragments of the former Avenger called Mantis. Opposing him are The Avengers and Haywire. The heroes head for Tamal, the Cotati homeworld, to save Mantis's son Sequoia (AKA Quoi) from Thanos. The Avengers then defeat Saurian space pirates, while Thanos gives Reptyl god-like powers. Thanos also turns Primo into a god, while Mantis tries to bond with her son, and the Titans have a failed attack on Thanos. Raptra then escapes from Thanos's ship and kidnaps Quoi, who she attempts to trade to Thanos for her life. Thanos refuses, so Raptra heads for the Rot, the child of Death and Thanos, to hide with Quoi. The Avengers escape from the Cotati, who are angered at them for failing to guard Quoi. Quoi and Raptra become romantically involved while on the run, Mantis finds out that the patch of utter darkness known as the Rot is a cancer for Eternity, and Thanos captures Raptra, Sequoia, Mantis and Vision. Thanos then tries to get into Mantis's and Quoi's minds but fails. His prisoners escape, and he's attacked by the Avengers. They all are then surrounded by the Rot, who is defeated by the heroes and villains.
