= Harbinger (DC Comics) =

Fictional DC comics character

- Harbinger as depicted in Crisis on Infinite Earths #3 (June 1985). Art by George Pérez.

Publication information
- Publisher: DC Comics
- First appearance: As Lyla Michaels: The New Teen Titans Annual #2 (July 1983); As Harbinger: Crisis on Infinite Earths #1 (April 1985)
- Created by: Marv Wolfman; George Pérez

In-story information
- Alter ego: Captain Lyla Michaels
- Species: Metahuman
- Team affiliations: New Guardians; Black Lantern Corps; United States Army
- Abilities: Self-duplication and reintegration; Energy manipulation; Electromagnetism; Superhuman strength, durability, and speed; Dimensional travel; Time travel; Chronokinesis; Cosmic awareness; Flight

The Harbinger (Lyla Michaels) is a superheroine appearing in publications by DC Comics. She had a supporting role in the "1986 Crisis on Infinite Earths" storyline, in which she gathers heroes to protect the multiverse from the Anti-Monitor.

The character appeared as a recurring character in The CW television series Arrow and The Flash television series, portrayed by Audrey Marie Anderson.

== Publication history ==
Lyla Michaels was created by Marv Wolfman and George Pérez, and first appeared in The New Teen Titans Annual #2 (July 1983). She first appeared as Harbinger in Crisis on Infinite Earths #1 (April 1985).

== Fictional character biography ==
Lyla Michaels is an orphan whose ship sunk during a violent storm before she was rescued by the Monitor, a cosmic being locked in an eternal war against his anti-matter counterpart, the Anti-Monitor. Raising Lyla as an assistant, the Monitor observes the multiverse's heroes and tests them for an impending final battle against the Anti-Monitor.

During the "Crisis on Infinite Earths" storyline, Lyla enters a womb-like chamber on the Monitor's instructions, gaining energy-based powers and the ability to clone herself. Assuming the guise of "Harbinger", she sends clones to recruit various heroes and villains to fight the Anti-Monitor's shadow demons and protect a series of vibration towers, designed to protect Earth-One and Earth-Two from the Anti-Monitor's antimatter waves.

While Harbinger is recruiting the hero Arion, a shadow demon merges with one of the Harbinger's duplicates, allowing the Anti-Monitor to control her. Under the Anti-Monitor's control, the Harbinger kills the Monitor. The Monitor, having foreseen the Anti-Monitor's gambit, has his life force power the vibration towers, saving Earth-One and Earth-Two. Harbinger reverts to her normal form and sacrifices her powers to save the other three remaining universes (home of the Freedom Fighters, the Charlton heroes, and the Marvel Family respectively) from annihilation.

When the five remaining universes merge, Harbinger records the history of the post-Crisis DC Universe into a computer satellite, which the Manhunters use as part of a greater plan to infiltrate the superhero community. Afterwards, she is offered membership with the Amazon tribe of Themyscira as the Amazons' historian.

In Superman/Batman, Kara Zor-El is resurrected, arrives on Earth, and is given shelter on Themyscira, where she befriends Harbinger. Remembering Supergirl's sacrifice during the Crisis, the Harbinger sacrifices herself in a failed bid to prevent Darkseid from kidnapping Kara.

Harbinger is reanimated as a Black Lantern during the "Blackest Night" storyline. She uses her knowledge of history to provoke her targets by bringing up emotional memories, but is destroyed with the other Black Lanterns.

An artificial intelligence of Harbinger who bears a resemblance to the original version is part of the House of Heroes, the Monitor's watchstation.

== In other media ==
=== Television ===
Audrey Marie Anderson as Lyla Michaels / Harbinger in the Arrowverse crossover "Crisis on Infinite Earths".

Lyla Michaels appears in the Arrowverse series Arrow and The Flash, portrayed by Audrey Marie Anderson. This version is an agent, later the director, of A.R.G.U.S. and John Diggle's estranged wife who secretly works for Mar Novu.

=== Film ===
- Lyla Michaels / Harbinger appears in Superman/Batman: Apocalypse, voiced by Rachel Quaintance.
- An original incarnation of Harbinger, Kara Zor-El, appears in the Tomorrowverse films Justice League: Warworld and Justice League: Crisis on Infinite Earths, voiced by Kari Wahlgren in the former.

=== Video games ===
- The AI incarnation of Harbinger appears in DC Universe Online.
- Lyla Michaels / Harbinger appears as a character summon in Scribblenauts Unmasked: A DC Comics Adventure.

=== Merchandise ===
Lyla Michaels / Harbinger received an action figure in DC Direct's Crisis line in 2005.
