= Millennium (comics) =

1988 DC Comics crossover story line

- Cover of Millennium #5 (February 1988), art by Joe Staton and Bruce D. Patterson.
- Publisher: DC Comics
- Publication date: January – February 1988
- Genre: Superhero; Crossover
Title(s)
Action Comics #596
Adventures of Superman #436-437
Batman #415
Blue Beetle vol. 6 #20-21
Booster Gold #24-25
Captain Atom vol. 2 #11
Detective Comics #582
Firestorm #67-68
Flash vol. 2 #8-9
The Green Lantern Corps #220-221
Infinity Inc. #46-47
Justice League International #9-10
Legion of Super-Heroes vol. 3 #42-43
Millennium #1-8
The New Guardians #1-12
The Outsiders #27-28
Secret Origins vol. 2 #22-23
The Spectre vol. 2 #10-11
Suicide Squad #9
Superman vol. 2 #13-14
Swamp Thing vol. 2 #65-66
Teen Titans Spotlight #18-19
Wonder Woman vol. 2 #12-13
Young All-Stars #8-9
- Main character(s): Justice League International; Green Lantern Corps; New Guardians; Manhunters

Creative team
- Writer: Steve Englehart
- Penciller: Joe Staton
- Inker: Ian Gibson
- Letterer: Bob Lappan
- Colorist: Carl Gafford
- Editor: Andy Helfer
- Softcover: ISBN 978-1-4012-2065-5

"Millennium" was a comic book crossover story line that ran through an eight-issue, self-titled, limited series and various other titles cover dated January and February 1988 by DC Comics. The limited series was published weekly, which was a departure for an American series. It was written by Steve Englehart, and with art by Joe Staton and Ian Gibson.

== Plot ==
The story takes place at a time when the Guardians of the Universe left Earth's dimension along with their mates, the Zamarons. However, one Guardian, Herupa Hando Hu, and his Zamaron mate, Nadia Safir, travel to Earth and announced to the world that they would select ten people to become the new Guardians of the Universe and give birth to a new race of immortals. They gather Earth's superheroes and sent them to find the chosen people around the world, including Thomas Kalmaku and the Floronic Man.

Unknown to everyone, the robotic Manhunters had obtained the sphere that Harbinger used to store the information she had gathered about the universe after Crisis on Infinite Earths. Using the sphere, the Manhunters learn the secret identities of Earth's heroes, and had planted their agents close to them. On finding out about the search for The Chosen, the Manhunters decided to prevent it, and had their agents reveal themselves and attack Earth’s heroes. The heroes, joined by Harbinger, defeat the Manhunter agents.

The Heroes managed to gather most of the Chosen, but two were killed over the course of the series, one (Terra of the Teen Titans) was dead, and one was senile. Another Chosen, a white supremacist from South Africa named Janwillem Kroef, eventually left the group because it contained non-white members. The Guardian and the Zamaron then died activating the latent powers of the remaining Chosen. They became a new superhero group, The New Guardians, which had its own comic book series afterwards, also by Englehart and Staton. The new series only lasted 12 issues.

The spirits of Herupa Hando Hu and Nadia Safir reappear and explain that alternate plans had been put in motion, and that a group of beings created by Kroef would be the true Chosen. The New Guardians later disbanded. The current status of the second Chosen is unknown.

=== Tie-in issues ===
- Action Comics #596
- Adventures of Superman #436-437
- Batman #415
- Blue Beetle vol. 6, #20-21
- Booster Gold #24-25
- Captain Atom vol. 2, #11
- Detective Comics #582
- Firestorm vol. 2 #67-68
- Flash vol. 2 #8-9
- Green Lantern Corps #220-221
- Infinity, Inc. #46-47
- Justice League International #9-10
- Legion of Super-Heroes vol. 3 #42-43
- The Outsiders #27-28
- Secret Origins vol. 2 #22-23
- The Spectre vol. 2 #10-11
- Suicide Squad #9
- Superman vol. 2 #13-14
- Teen Titans Spotlight #18-19
- Wonder Woman vol. 2 #12-13
- Young All-Stars #8-9
- Swamp Thing vol. 2 #65-66; an unofficial tie-in with the Millennium-related story of the Floronic Man
