= Thomas Kalmaku =

- Thomas Kalmaku, from Green Lantern vol. 4, #35 (Nov. 2008). Art by Ivan Reis.

Publication information
- Publisher: DC Comics
- First appearance: Green Lantern vol. 2, #2 (Oct. 1960)
- Created by: John Broome; Gil Kane

In-story information
- Team affiliations: Ferris Aircraft; New Guardians
- Supporting character of: Hal Jordan
- Notable aliases: Pieface
- Abilities: Aerospace engineering Business executive Mechanic

Thomas "Pieface" Kalmaku is a fictional character, a supporting character associated with Green Lantern in comic books published by DC Comics. He was created by writer John Broome and penciler Gil Kane.

== Fictional character biography ==
Thomas Kalmaku was introduced in Green Lantern vol. 2, #2 (Oct. 1960) as a young Inuk mechanic at Ferris Aircraft, also the employer of test pilot Hal Jordan. In the Silver Age he was referred to as Pieface; however, this has not been used for some time. As one journalist described:

Hal Jordan's mechanic was an Inuit unfortunately called "Pieface"—and despite fan speculation, that comes not from the ice-cream treat Eskimo Pie, which goes unmentioned in the early comics, but from an existing term for 'a person with a round face and a blank ... expression', according to the 1960 edition of The Dictionary of American Slang. Yet Thomas Kalmaku, as he was formally named, was Jordan's smart, capable, and always respectfully depicted best friend, eventually becoming a business executive and more. As played by Taika Waititi in the [2011 Green Lantern] film, he's an aerospace engineer.

In his early appearances, Kalmaku had a girlfriend named Terga. They later married and gave birth to their son Keith and daughter Kari.

Kalmaku was one of the few people who knew Jordan's secret identity and kept a journal of Green Lantern's adventures, which he later published as a biography. In several stories, as a non-costumed sidekick, he either assisted the hero or required rescuing.

In Millennium, Kalmaku becomes a founding member of the New Guardians despite his lack of powers and helps Guy Gardner with his anger issues. He eventually leaves the team to be with his family.

The graphic novel Legacy: The Last Will and Testament of Hal Jordan focuses on Kalmaku and his difficulty dealing with the aftermath of Jordan's time as Parallax. In it, he goes on a final mission on Jordan's behalf, eventually reconstructing the planet Oa and the Great Battery and mending his relationship with his family.

It is later revealed that the Guardians of the Universe once offered Kalmaku a power ring, but he turned it down. Additionally, Hal Jordan had once considered him as a potential replacement.

Kalmaku appears in Green Lantern: Secret Origin, which reworks some aspects of the Green Lantern mythos. In this new origin, he greatly disliked being called "Pieface", leading Hal Jordan to defend him from an arrogant pilot.

== Other versions ==
- An alternate universe variant of Thomas Kalmaku from Earth-21 appears in DC: The New Frontier.
- An alternate universe variant of Thomas Kalmaku appears in Flashpoint.

== In other media ==
=== Television ===
- Kairo, a character inspired by Tom Kalmaku, appears in The Superman/Aquaman Hour of Adventure, voiced by Paul Frees.
- Tom Kalmaku appears in the Young Justice episode "Depths", voiced by Kevin Michael Richardson.

=== Film ===
- Tom Kalmaku makes a non-speaking cameo appearance in Justice League: The New Frontier.
- Tom Kalmaku appears in Green Lantern, portrayed by Taika Waititi. This version is an aerospace engineer and employee of Ferris Aircraft.

=== Video games ===
Tom Kalmaku appears as a character summon in Scribblenauts Unmasked: A DC Comics Adventure.
