= Howard the Duck (video game) =

1986 video game

- Commodore 64 cover art
- Developer: Alternative Software
- Publisher: Activision
- Platforms: Apple II, Commodore 64, MSX, Amstrad CPC, ZX Spectrum
- Release: Apple II, C64: NA: 1986; ZX Spectrum: UK: 1986; MSX: NA: 1987; Amstrad CPC: UK: 1987
- Genre: Action

Howard the Duck, also known as Howard the Duck: Adventure on Volcano Island, is an action video game released in 1986 by Activision for the ZX Spectrum, Commodore 64 and Apple II. The game is a tie-in to the film Howard the Duck from the same year.

== Gameplay ==
The game involves players controlling Howard the Duck to save his best friends, Phil and Beverly. After being parachuted to Volcano Island, Howard needs to find a backpack to proceed with the search. The game consists then of four levels, in the last of which Howard, armed with a neutron gun, will finally face Overlord.

== Reception ==
Like the film, the game also received fairly negative reviews. Computer Gamer gave an overall 55%, by stating "beautifully presented, and well-programmed, it rates as one of Activision's better recent releases and deserves consideration outside its unfortunate tie-in", predicting, however, low longevity. Aktueller Software Markt described the game as not fulfilling the expectancies and not worth the money.
