= Howard the Duck =

Marvel Comics character

- Howard the Duck as depicted on a variant cover of Howard the Duck #1 (November 2015)

Publication information
- Publisher: Marvel Comics
- First appearance: Adventure into Fear #19 (Dec. 1973)
- Created by: Steve Gerber (writer); Val Mayerik (artist)

In-story information
- Alter ego: Howard Duckson
- Species: Duckworldian
- Place of origin: Duckworld
- Team affiliations: Circus of Crime; Defenders; All-Night Party; Daydreamers; A.R.M.O.R.; Fearsome Four; Ducky Dozen
- Partnerships: Man-Thing; Beverly Switzler
- Notable aliases: Leonard the Duck; Howard the Human; Iron Duck; Agent Duck; Cynical Duck
- Abilities: Master of Quack-Fu As Iron Duck: Armored suit grants: * Superhuman strength and durability * Foot-mounted leaping coils * Chest-mounted searchlight * Flamethrowers in both arms

Howard the Duck is a fictional character appearing in American comic books published by Marvel Comics. The character was created by writer Steve Gerber, based very loosely on his college friend Howard Tockman, and artist Val Mayerik. Howard the Duck first appeared in Adventure into Fear #19 (cover-dated Dec. 1973) and several subsequent series have chronicled the misadventures of the ill-tempered anthropomorphic animal trapped on a human-dominated Earth. Echoing this, the most common tagline of his comics reads 'Trapped In a World He Never Made!'.

Howard's adventures are generally social satires, while a few are parodies of genre fiction with a metafictional awareness of the medium. Their tone is existentialist, and their main joke, according to Gerber, is that there is no joke: "...that life's most serious moments and most incredibly dumb moments are often distinguishable only by a momentary point of view."

Howard the Duck was portrayed by Ed Gale and voiced by Chip Zien in the critically and commercially unsuccessful 1986 self-titled film. Starting in 2014, the character, voiced by Seth Green, appeared in cameos in several Marvel Cinematic Universe (MCU) films, the Disney XD animated series Guardians of the Galaxy (2015–19) and Ultimate Spider-Man (2016; with Kevin Michael Richardson), and the Disney+ series What If...? (2021–2024).

== Publication history ==
Howard the Duck's first appearance in Adventure into Fear #19 (Dec. 1973). Art by penciler Val Mayerik and inker Sal Trapani.

Howard the Duck was created by writer Steve Gerber and penciler Val Mayerik in Adventure into Fear #19 (Dec. 1973) as a secondary character in that comic's "Man-Thing" feature. He graduated to his own backup feature in Giant-Size Man-Thing #4–5 (May and Aug. 1975), confronting such bizarre horror-parody characters as Garko the Man-Frog and Bessie the Hellcow, before acquiring his own comic book title with Howard the Duck #1 in 1976.

Howard the Duck #1 (Jan. 1976), with series co-star Beverly Switzler in background. Cover art by Frank Brunner.

Gerber wrote 27 issues of the series (for the most part ditching the horror parodies), illustrated by a variety of artists, beginning with Frank Brunner. For Gerber, Howard was a flesh-and-blood duck and explained that "If Wile E. Coyote gets run over by a steamroller, the result is a pancake-flat coyote who can be expected to snap back to three dimensions within moments; if Howard gets run over by a steamroller, the result is blood on asphalt." Gene Colan became the regular penciller with issue #4. Gerber later said to Colan: "There really was almost a telepathic connection there. I would see something in my mind, and that is what you would draw! I've never had that experience with another artist before or since."

Sporting the slogan "Get Down, America!", the All-Night Party was a fictional political party that appeared in Gerber's Howard the Duck series during the U.S. Presidential campaign of 1976, and led to Howard the Duck allegedly receiving thousands of write-in votes in the actual election. Gerber addressed questions about the campaign in the letters column of the comic book and, as Mad Genius Associates, sold merchandise publicizing the campaign.

Marvel attempted a spin-off with a short-lived Howard the Duck newspaper comic strip from 1977 to 1978, at first written by Gerber and drawn by Colan and Mayerik, later written by Marv Wolfman and drawn by Alan Kupperberg.

Gerber gained a degree of creative autonomy when he became the comic series' editor in addition to his usual writing duties. With issue #16, unable to meet the deadline for his regular script, Gerber substituted an entire issue of text pieces and illustrations satirizing his own difficulties as a writer.

The Walt Disney Company contacted Marvel in 1977 over concerns that the visual design of Howard infringed on their trademark for Donald Duck. Marvel agreed to a redesign of the character by Disney artists. A key feature of the redesign was that the character would wear pants.

In 1978, Gerber was removed from the newspaper strip and the comic-book series due to chronic problems with deadlines. His final issue of the comic-book series was #27 (September 1978). The series continued for four more issues with stories by Marv Wolfman, Mary Skrenes, Mark Evanier, and Bill Mantlo.

The final episode of the newspaper strip was published on October 29, 1978. Issue #31 (May 1979) of the comic-book series announced on its letters page that it would be the final issue of Howard the Duck as a color comic. Marvel then relaunched the series that year as a bimonthly black and white magazine, with scripts by Mantlo, art by Colan and Michael Golden and unrelated backup features by others. The magazine was canceled after nine issues.

On August 29, 1980, after learning of Marvel's efforts to license Howard for use in film and broadcast media, Steve Gerber filed a copyright infringement lawsuit against Marvel corporate parent Cadence Industries and other parties, alleging that he was the sole owner of the character. This was one of the first highly publicized creator's rights cases in American comics, and attracted support from major industry figures, some of whom created homage/parody stories with Gerber to fund a lawsuit against Marvel; these included Destroyer Duck with Jack Kirby. The lawsuit was settled on September 24, 1982, with Gerber acknowledging that his work on the character was done as work-for-hire and that Marvel parent Cadence Industries owned "all right, title and interest" to Howard the Duck and the Howard material he had produced. On November 5, 1982, Judge David Kenyon approved the motion and dismissed the case.

The only new story featuring the character between 1981 and 1986 appeared in Bizarre Adventures #34 (1983) Scripted by Steven Grant, it featured a suicidal Howard being put through a parody of It's a Wonderful Life.

The original comic book series reappeared with issue #32 (January 1986). It featured a story that had been written by Grant four years earlier. Steve Gerber had submitted a script for the issue, but withdrew it after it had been revised to conform to editorial guidelines. Issue #33 (October 1986), scripted by Christopher Stager, featured a parody of the film Bride of Frankenstein. Howard co-creator Val Mayerik co-plotted the story and provided the art. It was released alongside an adaptation of the Howard the Duck feature film, which was published in Marvel Super Special #41 (November 1986) and a three-issue comic-book series.

Gerber returned to Howard in 1989 in The Sensational She-Hulk #14–17. The character was again living with Beverly Switzler, now working as a rent-a-ninja. How they got back together was never explained. Beverly was not involved in the story, in which She-Hulk takes Howard on a trip through several dimensions with a theoretical physicist from Empire State University.

Gerber's next story featuring Howard appeared in Spider-Man Team-Up #5 (December 1996), around the same time he was writing a "Savage Dragon/Destroyer Duck" crossover for Image. He had the idea to create an unofficial crossover between the two issues, where the characters would meet momentarily in the shadows, but which would not affect either story. Soon after, Gerber discovered that Howard was scheduled to appear in Ghost Rider vol. 3, #81 (Jan. 1997) alongside Devil Dinosaur and Moon-Boy, and issues of Generation X, as well as the three issue Daydreamers miniseries by J.M. DeMatteis. Gerber was not pleased with this development, and changed the "unofficial crossover" somewhat.

In Spider-Man Team-Up #5, Spider-Man, Beverly and Howard meet the Elf with a Gun and two shadowy figures (presumed to be Savage Dragon and Destroyer Duck) in a darkened warehouse, grab a disc, then leave shortly afterwards. But in the Savage Dragon/Destroyer Duck crossover comic, Elf with a Gun creates thousands of clones of Howard during a fierce battle. As Savage Dragon and Destroyer Duck escape the warehouse, they reveal that they rescued the "real" Howard and Beverly, while Spider-Man left with one of the clones. Howard has his feathers dyed green, and is renamed "Leonard the Duck", and Beverly has her hair dyed black and is renamed "Rhonda Martini". Leonard later had a cameo appearance in Savage Dragon #41, and Leonard and Rhonda have a single-panel cameo when they meet Gerber's Nevada in Vertigo Comics' Winter's Edge #2.

In 2001, when Marvel launched its MAX imprint of "mature readers" comics, Gerber returned to write a six-issue Howard the Duck miniseries illustrated by Phil Winslade and Glenn Fabry. Featuring several familiar Howard the Duck characters, the series, like the original one, parodied a wide range of other comics and pop culture figures, but with considerably stronger language and sexual content than what would have been allowable 25 years earlier. The series has Doctor Bong causing Howard to go through multiple changes of form, principally into a mouse (as a parody of Mickey Mouse, in retaliation for the Disney-mandated redesign), and entering a chain of events parodying comics such as Witchblade, Preacher and several others, with Howard ultimately having a conversation with God in Hell.

Howard had cameo appearances in She-Hulk (vol. 2) #9 in February 2005 and in She-Hulk vol. 3 #3/#100 in February 2006 (issue #3 was also the numbered as the 100th total issue of all the various She-Hulk series). In 2007, he returned in Howard the Duck vol. 4 #1-4, a miniseries by writer Ty Templeton and artist Juan Bobillo. This series was rated for ages 9 and up, though one issue was published with a Marvel Zombies tie-in cover with a parental advisory claim.

In November 2014, Marvel announced an ongoing series starting in March 2015 featuring Howard as a private investigator on Earth. The creative team consisted of writer Chip Zdarsky and artist Joe Quinones. Howard the Duck (vol. 5) ran for 5 issues before Marvel relaunched many of their existing titles with the All-New, All-Different Marvel line of comics. This led to a reboot produced by the same creative team starting with Howard the Duck (vol. 6) #1 in November 2015. This series included a two-part crossover with The Unbeatable Squirrel Girl. The 11th and last issue was released in October 2016.

== Fictional character biography ==
Howard's first appearance in comics is when he is abruptly abducted from his home planet by an unseen force and randomly dropped into the Florida Everglades by the demon-lord Thog the Nether-Spawn. He meets the Man-Thing, along with a barbarian named Korrek of Katharta, Dakimh the Enchanter and apprentice sorceress Jennifer Kale, but while travelling with them across dimensions to confront and defeat Thog, he accidentally falls off the inter-dimensional stepping stones that the group were traveling on and materializes in Cleveland, Ohio, where he battles Garko the Man-Frog. Howard is arrested at this time for disturbing the peace, but when the police commissioner discovers to his shock that Howard really is a duck rather than a man in a duck suit, the commissioner orders him released to avoid the embarrassment of having to report that they had arrested a duck. Howard also briefly encounters and kills a vampiric cow named Bessie the Hellcow.

Howard makes friends with an artists' model named Beverly Switzler and a bizarre series of encounters follow. He battles Pro-Rata, the cosmic accountant, then meets Spider-Man at the end of the battle. He battles Turnip-Man and the Kidney Lady, then learns the fictional martial art of "Quack-Fu". Howard then encounters the Winky Man, who is actually the sleepwalking alter-ego of Beverly's artist friend, Paul Same, and Howard also briefly becomes a professional wrestler.

Howard and Beverly hit the road, seeking shelter in a gothic mansion where they battle a girl named Patsy and her giant, animated-to-life gingerbread man. They eventually end up in New York City, where Howard is nominated for President of the United States by the All-Night Party and he later battles the Band of the Bland, alongside the Defenders. His presidential campaign derailed by a doctored-photo sex scandal, he travels to Canada where he defeats a supervillain, the Beaver, who caused the scandal. Howard then suffers a nervous breakdown and flees Bev and their situation on a bus. Unfortunately, the bus' passengers are all believers in various weird cults, and try to interest Howard in them. His seatmates are Winda Wester and the Kidney Lady, a woman who believes that the soul of a person lives in their kidneys and attempts to stop anything she sees as "anti-kidney health". After the bus crashes, Howard and Winda are sent to a mental institution. There he meets Daimon Hellstrom, and is briefly possessed by Hellstrom's demonic soul, becoming the new Son of Satan. Beverly and Paul manage to get them both back to Cleveland. Later, while on the S. S. Damned, a cruise ship returning from scenic Bagmom, Howard and Beverly are taken captive by Lester Verde. Verde had known Beverly in college where he had a crush on her, and has now assumed the identity of the supervillain Doctor Bong, who illegally marries Beverly against her will and transforms Howard into a human.

After escaping back to New York and being restored to his natural form, Howard is hired as a dishwasher by Beverly's uncle, Lee Switzler. Howard is later reunited with Dakihm the Enchanter, the Man-Thing, Korrek and Jennifer Kale, and they all battle the demon Bzzk'Joh. Korrek pilots the ship the Epoch Weasel and drops Howard back off at Cleveland before he and their allies fly away. Howard finally meets up with the cruise ship that rescued Paul and Winda from Doctor Bong, and finds that Paul and Winda have befriended socialite Iris Raritan.

Howard is later kidnapped by the Ringmaster and his Circus of Crime. Winda is abandoned by Paul and Iris and Paul is shot and left in a coma. After defeating the Circus of Crime, Howard is plagued by pessimistic dreams and goes his way alone, just as he had at the series' beginning.

Writer Bill Mantlo, beginning with issue #30, returned the series to its former status quo, bringing Beverly back into the picture and having her divorce Doctor Bong. Howard's creator Steve Gerber, who left the series after issue #27, originally intended for Beverly and Bong's marriage to be lasting and for Beverly to be written out of the series from that point on. Howard and Beverly's friend Paul, who had ended up in a coma after he had previously been shot by the Ringmaster, awakens from his coma and is released from the hospital. Beverly's uncle Lee brings everyone back to Cleveland and employs Howard as a cab driver, while Paul, back to being a somnambulist after his release from the hospital, becomes Winda's boyfriend. Howard dons a suit of "Iron Duck" armor made by Claude Starkowitz, a man who has delusions of being related to Tony Stark and dreams of being the personal armorer to Iron Man, and battles Doctor Bong in the final issue of the original 70s Howard the Duck series (issue #31). Howard later encounters Dracula and even once returns to Duckworld. At the end of the nine-issue magazine series, Howard leaves Beverly (at her request) and is later offered a genetically-constructed female duck mate, whom he does not take to.

On a later occasion, She-Hulk accidentally pulls Howard though a cosmic wormhole along with theoretical physicist Brent Wilcox and they are able to prevent other universes from crowding out Earth-616. During this time, Howard meets a character called the Critic, travels to a dimension known as the Baloneyverse and again battles a group called the Band of the Bland, whom he had previously battled with the Defenders.

In an encounter with Peter Parker and Ben Reilly (the then-current Spider-Man), Howard gets a rematch with the Circus of Crime and the Circus is defeated. During the fight, Howard and Beverly get stuck in a warehouse full of anthropomorphic ducks, briefly meeting the Savage Dragon and Destroyer Duck. Parker and Reilly leave the warehouse believing that they have the correct versions of Howard and Beverly with them. However, in the Savage Dragon/Destroyer Duck companion story that takes place simultaneously and that was written by Gerber, it is explained that the version of Howard and Beverly that left the warehouse with Parker and Reilly are simply clones taken by mistake and that the real Howard and Beverly actually left the scene with Savage Dragon and Destroyer Duck.

The sorceress Jennifer Kale, in a weekly attempt to return Howard to his home world, inadvertently teleports Devil Dinosaur and Moon-Boy into her New York apartment. The disoriented dinosaur attempts to eat Howard, but spits him out when shot with Johnny Blaze's hellfire gun. Devil Dinosaur and Moon-Boy then rampage through the city before being subdued by Ghost Rider (Daniel Ketch). Howard says that he relates to the pair being trapped in a world they never made before wandering off.

=== Heroes Reborn ===
After a brief series of adventures with Generation X, Howard gets a job as a department store Santa Claus, which gets him dragged to the North Pole where the real Santa Claus has sold out to Hydra. Howard goes through several dimensions, apparently through the power of Man-Thing, who can now talk but does not understand this new, unknown ability, and lands on a version of Duckworld where his parents are essentially Ward and June Cleaver, he has a sister named Princess, and he is regarded as a hero because his activities on Earth-616 were recognized by Duckworld's version of Reed Richards. This origin traces the source of these dimensions to be projections from Franklin's mind. Throughout the course of the adventure, Howard has a romance with Tana Nile, culminating in a kiss, after which he apologizes and tells her of his attachment to Beverly. When Franklin understands that he has shaped all of these worlds, the group finds themselves back in the Man-Thing's swamp. While Man-Thing becomes a self-appointed guardian to Franklin Richards, Howard goes off on his own and is captured by the Cult of Entropy, who wrap him in swaddling clothes. Although last seen in the swamp, Howard states that he was thrown into baggage and transported on a plane. The cult wants Howard because he has part of the Nexus of All Realities, which shattered during Heroes Reborn, inside of him. Man-Thing then enters Howard's mouth, and Howard vomits him back out with the fragment, but Man-Thing is left desiccated and practically dead. Howard then encounters Namor, who thought he had slain Man-Thing, but Howard explains that he would not be lugging his friend's body around if that were the case. Howard sets the Man-Thing down in the water, and he revives during Howard's conversation with Namor. Once he sees that the Man-Thing is alive and well, he bids Namor farewell and says that he is returning to Cleveland.

Years later, back with Beverly, he undergoes further shapeshifting experiences after an accident at a chemical facility of Doctor Bong's. Beverly is hired by Bong's Globally Branded Content Corporation, which manufactures boy bands from protein vats based on the sexual arousal of a focus group of gay men. Attempting to destroy an escapee whom Beverly has taken in, Bong inadvertently knocks Howard into a vat, which changes him, unstably, into a rat. When Howard later showers, he changes his form multiple times before again permanently returning to the form of the giant rat. Verde then goes to the press and claims that his building was attacked by Osama el-Barka ("Osama the Duck" in Arabic). Howard and Beverly are sent back on the road after the junkyard office where they are living is destroyed by a S.W.A.T. team. Denied admittance to every possible shelter due to lack of funds, the pair and their dog find a sign for the Boarding House of Mystery, but are taken to the police station for questioning and strip searches by Suzy Pazuzu, with whom Beverly had attended high school. One of the officers on the case is the same beat cop who mistook Howard for a mutant many years before. Suzy is the inheritor of the doucheblade, which starts to take her over when she wears an enchanted bracelet. In a skirmish, the bracelet is caught by Howard causing him to be the wielder of the doucheblade. The doucheblade causes its holder to grow enormous bare breasts and armor in a parody of Witchblade, and, possessed by this, Howard kills the male lover of a businessman who works with Verde as he and Verde break into Suzy's house.

Arriving at the Boarding House of Mystery, Howard and Beverly encounter Cain and Abel, the latter with a rock stuck in his head that allows him only moments of lucidity. There, they are granted their every wish, including Howard's return to his true form, and Beverly never being poor again, and meet parodies of John Constantine, Wesley Dodds, the Endless, Spider Jerusalem, and Gerber's own Nevada (called Utah), all characters from DC Comics' Vertigo imprint. The downside to the House is that everyone staying there gets their every wish; so Che Guevara can have his revolution, but someone else can easily slaughter him. One tenant, a writer named Mr. Gommorah (a parody of Spider Jerusalem), later takes Beverly and Howard to be on the Iprah show with the topic "Why Women Give It to Men Who Don't Get It", guest starring Dr. Phlip.

Upon leaving the House of Mystery, Howard is once again transformed into an anthropomorphic mouse. It is revealed that Iprah has been merged with an experiment by the Angel Gabriel called Deuteronomy, intended to replace God, because God has been spending all his time in a bar in Hell since 1938. Deuteronomy is a creature half-id and half-superego, while Iprah is an all-ego promoter of self-indulgent pop psychology. Considering her dangerous, Gabriel sends the cherub Thrasher to resurrect Sigmund Freud, whose cigar blasts out half of Thrasher's brains (being immortal, this just makes him act drunk). Iprah destroys Freud, but Howard blasts her with the cigar, separating her from Deuteronomy. Puffing on the cigar, Howard disintegrates and arrives in Hell. He is eventually freed by Yah, a being who claims to be "God".

=== Civil War ===
Sometime later, Howard attempts to register under the Superhero Registration Act during the superhero Civil War, but learns his socially disrupted life has created so many bureaucratic headaches that the government's official policy is that Howard does not exist. This lack of government oversight delights him: "For the rest of my life, no more parking tickets, or taxes, or jury duty. Heck, I couldn't even vote if I wanted to!" In this story, Howard says he was pressured to give up his cigars.

After he defeats the supervillain M.O.D.O.T.'s (Mobile Organism Designed Only for Talking) scheme to control the public through mass media, his attorney, Jennifer Walters, successfully restores his citizenship, including all relevant responsibilities.

=== Secret Invasion ===
Howard the Duck is briefly seen as part of the superpowered army gathered to battle invading Skrull forces. He is seen armed with a pistol and wearing a Skrull's hand around his neck. He is later seen kicking a Skrull during interrogation after the invasion. Brian Michael Bendis has commented when asked of Howard: "That character has shown up in six issues I've done, and I've never typed the words Howard the Duck."

=== Marvel Zombies 5 ===
In Marvel Zombies 5, Howard the Duck of Earth-616 teams up with Machine Man to travel across the multiverse fighting zombies.

=== Fear Itself ===
During the Fear Itself storyline, Howard forms a team called the Fearsome Four with She-Hulk, Frankenstein's Monster and Nighthawk to stop the Man-Thing when he goes on a rampage in Manhattan, due to the fear and chaos he senses on the citizens. They later discover a plot by Psycho-Man to use the Man-Thing's volatile empathy to create a weapon.

=== Spider-Man: Back in Quack ===
Howard and Beverly are brainwashed and forced to work for Save Our Offspring From Indecency (S.O.O.F.I.) as Cynical Duck and Swizzle. They promote S.O.O.F.I. at a public speech held for them by J. Jonah Jameson. Spider-Man later interrupts a S.O.O.F.I. indoctrination at the New York Public Library, and Beverly and the other S.O.O.F.I.s see Spidey as a semi-demonic figure and attack him. Spidey escapes with Howard and breaks his brainwashing when Beverly is threatened. Howard quickly explains S.O.O.F.I.'s goals to Spider-Man. As Spider-Man publicly announces his long-standing support for S.O.O.F.I., Howard confronts Bev as she stands beside the Supreme S.O.O.F.I. Howard is able to break through to Beverly, reminding her of their past together. The Supreme S.O.O.F.I. orders the S.O.O.F.I.s to throw the pair into the special Blanditron at Guantanamo Bay, but Beverly keeps them at bay with a whip. Spidey attacks the S.O.O.F.I.s and unmasks the Supreme S.O.O.F.I., while the others escape through their teleporter. Howard states that he believes S.O.O.F.I. will lay low for a while after such a defeat and he also hopes that the group's Florida Everglades base might lead them to meet up with the Man-Thing.

=== The Ducky Dozen ===
Because of his experience with zombie-infested worlds and his leadership of Machine Man, Howard is chosen as the leader of, as he dubs them, the Ducky Dozen. The team is composed of him, several Golden Age heroes, Dum-Dum Dugan, and Battlestar, who is also a veteran of a zombie incident. Upon entering Earth-12591, the Ducky Dozen fight hordes of zombie Nazis and Asgardians, but suffer grave losses as the team's members are either killed or zombified during the battle. After successfully accomplishing their mission, Howard, Dugan, Taxi Taylor and Battlestar are the only members to survive and return to Earth-616 along with the Riveter, the only survivor of Earth-12591's resistance team, the Suffragists.

=== Wolverine and the X-Men ===
Howard later teams up with his friend Doop to battle the Robo-Barbarians in Dimension ZZZ. They beat the horde back with nothing but a broken sword, a rubber chicken with nails in it and a gun that shoots bees.

=== Original Sin ===
After the death of Uatu the Watcher and the activation of the secrets buried in his eye, Howard discovers that he has the potential to be the most intelligent being in Duckworld. After evading a squirrel while driving, he is thrown flying from his vehicle but uses his intellect to calculate a way to land safely in a nearby dumpster.

=== Back to New York ===
Howard returns to his business as a private eye, working in the same building as She-Hulk, in Brooklyn. One of his first new clients is Jonathan Richards, who hires Howard to retrieve a necklace stolen by the Black Cat. With the help of Tara Tam, his new friend and assistant, Howard manages to recover the necklace. However, on his way to give it back to Richards, he finds himself kidnapped by the Collector and allied with the Guardians of the Galaxy to escape the villain, who was attempting to add Howard to his collection of rare space objects and entities. Upon returning to Earth, Howard is robbed by May Parker, Spider-Man's aunt, and later re-encounters the Ringmaster, who is revealed to have brainwashed the elderly into committing robberies. After recovering the necklace for a third time, Howard is approached by Richards in the middle of his fight against the Ringmaster and Richards reveals himself to be Talos the Untamed, who reveals that the necklace was part of a marginally powerful item known as the Abundant Glove. With help from Doctor Strange, Howard and Tara locate the final piece of the Abundant Glove, but are unable to put it back together when Talos grabs it and proceeds to use it to wreak havoc on the city. Talos is confronted by numerous heroes while Howard and Tara take cover. Howard is able to point out that Tara, who is revealed to possess shapeshifting powers similar to that of a Skrull, could help him defeat Talos. Tara used her powers to impersonate Skrull Emperor Kl'rt (the Super-Skrull), distracting Talos long enough for Howard to snatch the Abundant Glove from his hand. Talos is later apprehended by the Fantastic Four and everything returns to normal.

Afterwards, with the help of new arrival Gwenpool, Howard prevented Hydra from infecting the world with a deadly virus. Actress Lea Thompson hires Howard to discover why she has been having memory lapses and dreams about a "duck man" similar to him, and the investigation discovered Mojo had been broadcasting Howard's adventures as a reality show, and to fill in the gaps on his life, Mojo filmed footage of a small alien in a duck costume interacting with Thompson performing as Switzler (referencing the 1986 film adaptation of Howard). He also has a crossover event with The Unbeatable Squirrel Girl. Howard the Duck is shown to be living in the She-Hulk's apartment building when Patsy Walker moved out.

=== War of the Realms ===
During the War of the Realms storyline, Howard, (whose last name is revealed to be Duckson), is hired by a wealthy lady to find her pet dog. Howard, along with Tara and May Parker, finds the dog on a park surrounded by Frost Giants and manages to call it over to May's car, until the dog gets itself filthy forcing Howard to pay May for the car wash.

== Powers and abilities ==
Howard has no superhuman powers, but is skilled in the martial art known as Quak-Fu, enough to defeat, or at least to hold his own against, far larger opponents. He has shown some degree of mystic talent in the past, to the point that Stephen Strange taught some spells to Howard and even offered to train him, but Howard declined.

On one occasion, Howard used a suit of powered armor known as the "Iron Duck", designed by Claude Starkowitz. Besides its property as body armor, the suit was equipped with foot-mounted leaping coils, a chest-mounted searchlight, and arm-mounted flamethrowers.

== Characteristics and associations ==
Howard the Duck is a two-foot-seven-inch-tall anthropomorphic duck. He generally wears a tie and shirt and is almost always found smoking a cigar. Originally, like many cartoon ducks, he wore no pants; Disney threatened legal action due to Howard's resemblance to Donald Duck, and Marvel redesigned that aspect of the character by writing into the script that Howard was the target of anti-nudity protests, and was forced to do business with "Wally Sidney", a failed cartoonist who made his fortune through a chain of conservative clothing retailers known as "Sidney World". Howard tries on various outfits, including ones akin to Donald Duck's sailor uniform and Uncle Scrooge's coat and top hat, before settling on his new attire of a business suit complete with trousers. Although Howard sulks that he has lost, Beverly reassures him that she does not want him to be a victim of a mob, and loves him no matter what he wears.

Howard has an irritable and cynical attitude towards the often bizarre events around him; he feels there is nothing special about him except that he is a duck, and though he has no goals other than seeking comfort and to be left alone, he is often dragged into dangerous adventures simply because he is visibly unusual. He often tends to exclaim or mutter "Waugh!" as a catchphrase in moments of frustration, surprise, or anger. His series' tagline, "Trapped in a world he never made", played off the genre trappings of 1950s science fiction.

His near-constant companion and occasional girlfriend is former art model and Cleveland native Beverly Switzler. Like Howard, Beverly wants an ordinary life but is frequently singled out for her appearance, though as a beautiful woman rather than a duck. His other friends include Paul Same (a painter who briefly became a sleepwalking crime-fighter named the Winky Man), Winda Wester (a lisping ingénue with psychic powers), and country music singer Dreyfus Gultch. Howard has worked with Spider-Man and the Man-Thing on various occasions.

Howard found himself on Earth due to a shift in the "Cosmic Axis" from a world similar to Earth, but where there are "more ducks" and "apes don't talk." In the black-and-white Howard the Duck magazine series, writer Bill Mantlo theorized that Howard came from an extra-dimensional planet called Duckworld, a planet similar to Earth where ducks, not apes, had evolved to become the dominant species. In 2001, Gerber dismissed this idea, calling it "very pedestrian" and 'comic-booky' — in the worst sense of the term." Gerber stated that Howard came from an alternate Earth populated by a variety of anthropomorphic animals and not Duckworld. A panel in Fear #19, prior to Howard's introduction, depicts Howard or someone like him near an anthropomorphic mouse and an anthropomorphic dog, in a panel about hypothetical other dimensions. Gerber later depicted his character Destroyer Duck as existing in such a world.

His antagonists (who usually appear in a single story each) are often parodies of science fiction, fantasy, or horror characters, as well as frequent parodies of political figures and organizations. The chief recurring villain, Lester Verde, better known as Doctor Bong – modeled on Doctor Doom and writers Bob Greene and Lester Bangs – is a former tabloid reporter who has the power to "reorder reality" by smashing himself on the bell-shaped helmet on his head and his main goal is to marry Beverly. Beverly eventually agreed to marry him to save Howard from Bong's evil experimentation, but the two were divorced shortly thereafter. Doctor Bong would reappear in issues of She-Hulk and Deadpool in the mid-1990s. Other recurring villains include the Kidney Lady, an older woman who has been convinced by her former lover that the soul is in the kidneys and attacks anything she sees as a threat to them, and Reverend Jun Moon Yuc and his Yuccies, a parody of Reverend Sun Myung Moon and the Unification Church ("Moonies"). Another important villain was the organization S.O.O.F.I. (Save Our Offspring From Indecency), whose leader was implied to be Anita Bryant, though she looked like an old, fat Elvis Presley with a smiley face/orange on her head.

Other Marvel Comics characters occasionally appeared with Howard, including Spider-Man, the Son of Satan and the Ringmaster. Omega the Unknown appeared to him in a dream, as did Spider-Man and the founding members of the rock group Kiss on other occasions.

Seemingly an autodidact, Howard at various times references Georg Wilhelm Friedrich Hegel, Albert Camus (whose novel The Stranger Gerber considers the principal influence on the comic series), the Brontë sisters, and other figures of philosophical and political significance. In a parody of the Marvel comic character Shang-Chi, Howard was trained in the martial art of Quak-Fu. In the 2001 miniseries, as a mocking gesture toward Disney's mascot Mickey Mouse and as a reference to a previous lawsuit with the company over Howard's similarity to Donald Duck, Howard was turned into various other animals, but primarily appeared in the series as an anthropomorphic mouse.

== Other versions ==
=== Amalgam Comics ===
Lobo the Duck, a fusion of Howard the Duck and DC Comics character Lobo, appears in a self-titled Amalgam Comics one-shot.

=== Legion of Howards ===
In a parody of the Spider-Verse event, Howard and Leo Fitz team up with a group of Howards from across the Multiverse who collectively call themselves the Legion of Howards. Their ranks include:

- Howard the Duck - A version of Howard who wields Mjolnir and possesses the power of Thor.
- Sister Howard the Duck - A female version of Howard who is a nun on her world.
- Howard the Roboduck - A Japanese-style giant mecha piloted by an alternate version of Beverly Switzler.
- The Ever-Lovin' Blue-Eyed Howard the Duck - A version of Howard who possesses the abilities and appearance of the Thing.
- Strange-Duck - A mystical version of Howard who acts as his world's Sorcerer Supreme.

=== Marvel Zombies ===
A zombified alternate universe version of Howard the Duck from Earth-2149 appears in Marvel Zombies.

=== MC2 ===
In the Marvel Comics 2 universe, Howard is seen as a blindfold-wearing martial arts teacher, a reference harkening back to his mastery of "Quack Fu" in the original 1970s series.

=== Spider-Gwen ===
On Earth-65 in the Spider-Gwen series, a human named Howard T. Duck is the President of the United States.

=== Ultimate Marvel ===
In the miniseries Ultimate Comics: Armor Wars, a billboard advertising for "HDTV" is seen in the first panel, showing Howard.

=== Ultimate Universe ===
An alternate universe version of Howard the Duck appears in the Ultimate Universe imprint. He was seen among the prisoners of H.A.N.D. Wasp later frees him.

=== Universe X ===
- While Howard does not appear, the Beast says "I still feel badly about Howard," who had been "hunted down and consumed."
- In the original draft for Earth X, Howard was supposedly served as a feast during the Skrull's invasion of New York City. The scene was cut due to space constraints.

== In other media ==
=== Television ===
- Howard the Duck makes a cameo appearance in the Ultimate Spider-Man episode "Awesome", voiced by Kevin Michael Richardson. This version is contained in a lab on the S.H.I.E.L.D. Helicarrier.
  - Additionally, an alternate reality pirate version of Howard appears in the episode "Return to the Spider-Verse" Pt. 2, voiced by Seth Green. This version is a member of Captain Web Beard's crew.
- Howard the Duck makes a non-speaking cameo appearance in the Hulk and the Agents of S.M.A.S.H. episode "The Collector" as one of the eponymous character's prisoners.
- Howard the Duck appears in Guardians of the Galaxy (2015), voiced again by Seth Green. This version is an old acquaintance of Rocket Raccoon.
- Hulu intended to air a Howard the Duck animated series, written and executive produced by Kevin Smith and Dave Willis, that would have led up to a crossover special involving MODOK, Hit-Monkey, Tigra, and Dazzler called The Offenders. However, in January 2020, it was announced that the Howard the Duck series was cancelled.

=== Film ===
Howard the Duck appears in a self-titled film, voiced by Chip Zien and portrayed by stunt actors Peter Baird, Ed Gale, Jordan Prentice, Tim Rose, Steve Sleap, Lisa Sturz, and Mary Wells. This version was transported to Earth following a laser spectroscope experiment gone awry.

=== Marvel Cinematic Universe ===
Howard the Duck makes cameo appearances in media set in the Marvel Cinematic Universe, voiced by Seth Green.

- Howard first appears in the live-action film Guardians of the Galaxy, as a living exhibit in the Collector's museum on Knowhere before the Collector's slave Carina uses the Power Stone to cause an explosion that kills her and frees the Collector's imprisoned creatures. In a post-credits scene, Howard has a drink with the Collector and Cosmo amidst the wreckage. In August 2014, Guardians of the Galaxy director James Gunn said, "It's possible Howard could reappear as more of a character in the Marvel [Cinematic] Universe. But if people think that's going to lead to a Howard the Duck movie, that's probably not going to happen in the next four years. Who knows after that?"
- Howard makes appearances in the live-action films Guardians of the Galaxy Vol. 2, Avengers: Endgame, and Guardians of the Galaxy Vol. 3. He was also meant to make a cameo appearance in the live-action film Avengers: Infinity War. While the scene was cut, Howard was confirmed to have survived the Blip.
- Alternate timeline variants of Howard appear in the Disney+ animated series What If...?, voiced again by Green.
- Plans have also occurred for Howard to star in his own film. In 2016, Rob Zombie claimed that he had pitched a Howard the Duck film to Marvel, but was turned down. After a rumor in June 2017 incorrectly stated that Marvel Studios was developing a film based on Howard that would involve Gunn as a producer, Gunn himself confirmed later that September that a film for the character was not being made. In June 2018, Lea Thompson revealed that she was preparing to meet with Marvel Studios about her pitch for a new Howard the Duck film she wanted to direct after starring in the 1986 film as Beverly Switzler. Thompson had developed the pitch to be set in the MCU and worked on it "for a really long time" with modern Howard the Duck comic book writers Chip Zdarsky and Joe Quinones, who had included her as a character in one of their comic runs. That September, Thompson said Marvel Studios loved her pitch but told her they had no plans for a Howard the Duck film and that they would contact her again following the development of their MCU television series on Disney+. Thompson expressed further interest in directing an MCU reboot for the character following his appearances in What If...?.

=== Video games ===
- Howard the Duck appears in a self-titled video game.
- Howard the Duck appears as a support card in Ultimate Marvel vs Capcom 3.
- Howard the Duck appears as a playable character in Lego Marvel Super Heroes.
- Howard the Duck appears as a playable character in Marvel Avengers Alliance.
- Howard the Duck wearing his Iron Duck armor and Venom the Duck appear as playable characters in Marvel Contest of Champions,
- Howard the Duck appears as a playable character in Marvel Puzzle Quest. Chip Zdarsky and Joe Quinones, who were writing Howard's comic at the time, served as consultants in the development of the character.
- Howard the Duck wearing a variation of his Iron Duck armor appears as a playable character in Lego Marvel Super Heroes 2, voiced by Greg Miller.

=== Miscellaneous ===
- In 1980, a pilot for a Howard the Duck radio show was recorded, with James Belushi in the title role, though the program was never aired.
- Howard the Duck, based on the MCU incarnation, makes a cameo appearance in the Disney California Adventure attraction Guardians of the Galaxy – Mission: Breakout!, voiced again by Seth Green.

=== Other comics ===
- In Savage Dragon/Destroyer Duck #1 (Nov. 1996), Gerber claims that Howard and Beverly Switzler changed their names to Leonard the Duck and Rhonda Martini, remained in the Image Comics Universe, and "were last sighted in Chicago boarding the Amtrak for Buffalo" while the duck who returned to Marvel is "only an empty trademark, a clone whose soul departed him at the corner of Floss and Regret." This was done because Tom Brevoort invited Gerber to write the comic, claiming he was the only one to write Howard, then Gerber noticed the Howard guest appearances in Ghost Rider and Generation X and felt as though he had been tricked.
- In the Don Simpson's Megaton Man feature, a comedy relief character is Gower Goose, an intended parody of Howard.
- In the Claypool Comics series Elvira Mistress of the Dark, Gordon the Goose (clearly modelled on Howard) appears, together with Dorkheem the Sorcerer and the Heap-Thing, in issues #49, 58, and 59.
- In America's Best Comics' Top 10 #8, a duck appearing to be Howard (with his distinctive blue hat & jacket) can be seen at the Transworld Transport Terminus.
- In several issues of The Maxx, Howard appears, along with many other characters, seemingly cut and pasted into the story.
- In Adam Beechen's ending of Doctor Fate: More Pain Comics, which Gerber left unfinished when he died, Howard, who is heard but unseen (his speech balloon ends with "waaugh"), dispatched the Elf with a Gun to destroy Negal and Ymp, then invited for one last drink with Yah, Bev, Thunny, and Megs before Yah goes back "upstairs".
- He is also seen being roasted in one of the Deadpool Kills The Marvel Universe issues, where the reporter states that Deadpool has gone into a killing spree, looking for heroes and villains alike, and also some characters that were never too special to begin with.

=== Newspaper comic strip ===
Between June 6, 1977 and October 29, 1978, Howard the Duck appeared in a syndicated daily comic strip that comic strip historian Allan Holtz has described as having low distribution and that was eventually replaced by the Incredible Hulk comic strip. The strip was syndicated in almost 70 newspapers (by the Register and Tribune Syndicate), including the Toronto Star and Spokane Daily Chronicle. When the strip was dropped by the Cleveland Plain Dealer, a Cleveland TV station began televising the strip for two minutes each night.

A total of eleven story arcs, as well as a number of single-joke strips, constitute the 511 individual strips that were printed.

The strip started with original stories written by Steve Gerber and illustrated by Gene Colan: "Pop Syke -- The Consciousness of Success", "The Cult of Entropy" and "Fred Feenix the Self-Made Man". The latter was started by Colan and completed by Val Mayerik, who stayed on to do two additional Gerber-scripted stories: "The Sleigh Jacking" and "In Search of the Good Life".

These were followed by an adaptation of the "Sleep of the Just" story from issue #4 of the Marvel comic, scripted by Gerber and illustrated by Alan Kupperberg. Gerber was fired from the strip in early 1978 over chronic problems with deadlines. He was replaced by Marv Wolfman as writer, while Alan Kupperberg continued as artist. The remaining stories were: "Close Encounters of the Fowl Kind", "The Tuesday Ruby", "The Clone Ranger", "Bye Bye, Beverly" and "The Mystery of the Maltese Human". As the series drew to an end, its already meager list of client papers shrank, making copies of these last post-Gerber stories particularly hard to find.

In November 1978, the first of a projected eight-issue series reprinting the entire strip was published by John Zawadzki. Titled It's Adventure Time With...Howard the Duck, only the initial issue was published.

== Collected editions ==
| Title | Material collected | Published date | ISBN |
|---|---|---|---|
| Essential Howard the Duck | Fear #19, Giant-Size Man-Thing #4–5, Howard The Duck (vol. 1) #1–27, Howard The Duck Annual #1, and Marvel Treasury Edition #12 | March 2002 | 978-0785108313 |
| Howard the Duck Omnibus | Fear #19, Man-Thing #1, Giant-Size Man-Thing #4–5, Howard the Duck (vol. 1) #1–33, Marvel Treasury Edition #12, and Marvel Team-Up #96 | August 2008 | 978-0785130239 |
| Marvel Masterworks: Howard the Duck Vol. 1 | Fear #19, Giant-Size Man-Thing #4–5, Man-Thing #1, Howard The Duck (vol. 1) #1–14, Marvel Treasury Edition #12 and Foom #15 | March 2021 | 978-1302922160 |
| Marvel Masterworks: Howard the Duck Vol. 2 | Howard the Duck (vol. 1) #15–31 and Howard The Duck Annual #1 | March 2023 | 978-1302949273 |
| Howard the Duck: The Complete Collection Vol. 1 | Fear #19, Man-Thing #1, Giant-Size Man-Thing #4–5, Howard the Duck (vol. 1) #1–16, Marvel Treasury Edition #12, and Howard the Duck Annual #1 | June 2015 | 978-0785197768 |
| Howard the Duck: The Complete Collection Vol. 2 | Howard the Duck (vol. 1) #17–31 and Howard the Duck (vol. 2) magazine #1 | March 2016 | 978-0785196860 |
| Howard the Duck: The Complete Collection Vol. 3 | Howard the Duck (vol. 2) magazine #2–7 and material from Crazy #59, 63, and 65 | August 2016 | 978-1302902049 |
| Howard the Duck: The Complete Collection Vol. 4 | Howard the Duck (vol. 2) magazine #8–9, Marvel Team-Up #96, Howard the Duck vol. 1 #32-33, Sensational She-Hulk #14-17, and material from Bizarre Adventures #34, Marvel Tales #237, Spider-Man Team-Up #5 | October 2017 | 978-1302908607 |
| Howard the Duck | Howard the Duck (vol. 3) #1–6 | September 2002 | 978-0785109310 |
| Howard the Duck: Media Duckling | Howard the Duck (vol. 4) #1–4, Howard the Duck Vol. 1 #1 and material from Civil War: Choosing Sides. | April 2008 | 978-0785127765 |
| Spider-Man: Animal Magnetism | Spider-Man: Back in Quack and Spider-Ham 25th Anniversary Special, Ultimate Civil War Spider-Ham and Top Dog #10 | February 2011 | 978-0785151937 |
| Howard the Duck Vol. 0: What the Duck | Howard the Duck (vol. 5) #1–5 | October 2015 | 978-0785197720 |
| Howard the Duck Vol. 1: Duck Hunt | Howard the Duck (vol. 6) #1-6 and The Unbeatable Squirrel Girl (vol. 2) #6 | June 2016 | 978-0785199380 |
| Howard the Duck Vol. 2: Good Night, and Good Duck | Howard the Duck (vol. 6) #7-11 | November 2016 | 978-0785199397 |
| Howard the Duck by Zdarsky & Quinones Omnibus | Howard the Duck (vol. 5) #1–5, Howard the Duck (vol. 6) #1-11, The Unbeatable Squirrel Girl (vol. 2) #6, and material from War of the Realms: War Scrolls #1 | November 2021 | 978-1302932015 |

=== Alternate versions ===
| Title | Material collected | Published date | ISBN |
|---|---|---|---|
| Secret Wars Journal/Battleworld | Howard the Human #1 and Secret Wars Journal #1-5, Secret Wars: Battleworld #1-4 and Secret Wars: Agents of Atlas #1 | March 2016 | 978-0785195801 |
| Deadpool the Duck | Deadpool the Duck #1-5 | May 2017 | 978-1846538018 |

== Reception ==
Michael Burkett of the Orange County Register described Howard the Duck as a "cantankerous, stogie-chomping, nattily dressed" antihero with an "acerbic wit, irascible personality and down-and-dirty street smarts" that distinguished him from other cartoon animal characters. Burkett likened Howard to "Donald Duck cross-bred with Groucho Marx and Jean-Paul Sartre." He wrote that Howard's "cult-worshipped" 1970s comic book series brought the "surrealism, social commentary, political satire and what-the-hell-am-I-doing-here philosophy" of 1960s "underground comics" into the mainstream. The New Yorker said Howard believed in "mainstream social Darwinism" and was "a web-footed Eric Hoffer". Kenneth Turan of The Washington Post called Howard "an Everyman with feathers, forever shooting his mouth off, battling a gloomy reality."

Marvel editor-in-chief Roy Thomas thought that Howard, as a "funny animal" character, was inappropriate for the horror comic book in which he was introduced. He told Gerber to dispose of the character "as fast as you can." After Gerber showed Howard seemingly dying by falling into a void, Marvel's "office was flooded with letters" of protest. One fan even sent in a duck carcass to make his point. At San Diego Comic-Con, the auditorium stood up and applauded when a fan asked Thomas if Howard would ever come back. Marvel responded by bringing Howard back for more appearances and soon launching his own self-titled comic book series.

Howard the Duck #1 "was the best-selling book Marvel ever had (that wasn't based on a movie)" according to artist Frank Brunner. The debut issue of his series instantly became a target of speculators and "occasionally sold for as much as $25." Comic-book dealer Jim Kovacs said he followed a delivery truck on the day of its release and "bought 900 copies right off the newsstands." Marvel's circulation director Ed Shukin said he "underestimated" demand, only printing 275,000 copies, the minimum amount allowed at the time. By December 1977, the issue was selling for an average price of $12.50, which comic book price guide publisher Robert Overstreet described as "the most phenomenal growth of any comic book that has been published." Gerber was angry about the hoarding situation, "I felt as if the book had been sabotaged by the very people who supposedly liked the character." He suspected that the lack of availability of issue #1 eventually led to lower sales on the entire series. Howard's first issue has been cited as "the first big speculative book in the collectors market" for comic books.

The Howard the Duck comic book has been described as "the first successful title aimed at an older audience." Former Marvel editor-in-chief Jim Shooter said that Howard "had developed some cult favorite status that extended as far as Hollywood." During post-production on Star Wars, George Lucas showed issue #1 to his friends and collaborators Willard Huyck and Gloria Katz, telling them, "this would make a great movie." Gerber was surprised at how quickly the character attracted mainstream media attention. He was contacted for interviews by New York magazine, The New Yorker, The Washington Post, and others.

"Precious", a song written by Chrissie Hynde for The Pretenders' first album, features the lyric "Now Howard the Duck and Mr. Stress both stayed / Trapped in a world they never made". According to lead guitarist James Honeyman-Scott, quoted in Beat magazine, "Chrissie used to read Howard the Duck comic books and then she introduced Howard to [bassist] Pete [Farndon] and Pete was well over the top on it. He's got every Howard the Duck comic ever."

After Gerber parted ways with Marvel in 1978 amid numerous legal and creative disputes, and other writers took over for him, Howard the Duck's popularity diminished rapidly. Stan Lee, Shooter and Gerber himself criticized the post-Gerber stories for their lack of substance and clever humor. Within three years of Gerber's departure, Marvel had ceased publishing new Howard the Duck material. Lucasfilm's big-budget 1986 Howard the Duck film disappointed critics, audiences and the character's fans alike. Although Marvel has occasionally released new Howard comic books, some written by Gerber, and sometimes features the character in other media, Howard's popularity has never again approached what it was in the 1970s.

In August 2009, Time listed Howard the Duck as one of the "Top 10 Oddest Marvel Characters".
