= Mary Skrenes =

Comic book writer

- Area: Writer
- Pseudonym: Virgil North
- Notable works: Omega the Unknown

Mary Skrenes (/skriːnz/) is an American comic book writer and screenwriter.

She may be best known as co-creator (with Steve Gerber) of Omega the Unknown for Marvel Comics, although she worked on other Marvel characters such as the Defenders and Guardians of the Galaxy. She was the creator of and inspiration for Beverly Switzler, the companion of Howard the Duck. For Omega the Unknown, Skrenes created the supporting characters Amber Grant and Dian Wilkins. She published a number of horror stories for DC under the name Virgil North, and began a long collaboration with Steve Skeates. According to Skeates, a number of his mystery stories were actually co-written with Skrenes, but she insisted on submitting them under Skeates's name alone because of bad blood between her and editor Joe Orlando.

Skrenes got her first professional work for DC Comics in the early 1970s, writing horror and romance stories under the tutelage of editor Dick Giordano.

Skrenes wrote several episodes of Jem, GI Joe and Transformers in the 1980s. In 2004 she re-united with Gerber to write the short-lived comic Hard Time. For contractual reasons, she was credited only on Season Two; however, the first issue stated that she had been involved with the series from the beginning.

== Personal life ==
Collaborator Steve Gerber once described Skrenes in his blog as "such a private person that when she gets back to town she’ll probably castigate me for having just revealed that she’s such a private person."

== Bibliography ==
=== Comic books ===
==== DC Comics ====
- The Dark Mansion of Forbidden Love #2 (1971)
- House of Secrets #92, 120 (1971,1974)
- House of Mystery vol. 1 #204 (1972)
- Plop! #4, 9, 16 (1974–1975)
- Detective Comics #449 (1975)
- The Unexpected #201 (1980)
- Hard Time vol. 1 #1–12 (2004–2005), vol.2 #1–7 (2005–2006)

==== Marvel ====
- The Deadly Hands of Kung Fu #5, 13 (1974–1975)
- The Defenders vol. 1 #36 (1976)
- Omega the Unknown #1–6,9–10 (1976–1977)
- Howard the Duck Annual 1 (1977), #28 (1978)

==== Star*Reach ====
- Star Reach #4–5 (1976)
- Quack #2 (1977)

== Television credits ==
- G.I. Joe: A Real American Hero (1985–1986)
- The Transformers (1986)
- Jem (1986–1987)
