= Hellcow =

- Hellcow as seen in Deadpool Team-Up #885 (April 2011)

Publication information
- Publisher: Marvel Comics
- First appearance: Giant-Size Man-Thing #5 (1975)
- Created by: Steve Gerber (writer); Frank Brunner (artist)

In-story information
- Alter ego: Bessie
- Species: Vampire cattle
- Place of origin: Earth
- Partnerships: Deadpool
- Notable aliases: Bovine, Blood-Beast, Cowled Cow, Farm Killer, Recreant Ruminant
- Abilities: Cow/vampire physiology; Immortality; Flight; Shapeshifting

Bessie, better known as Hellcow, is a fictional character appearing in American comic books published by Marvel Comics. The character, a vampire cow, was created by writer Steve Gerber and artist Frank Brunner. She made her first appearance in Giant-Size Man-Thing #5 (1975).

== Publication history ==
Bessie, or Hellcow, made her official debut in Giant-Size Man-Thing #5, published in August 1975. The creative team in charge of the issue comprised writer Steve Gerber, penciller Frank Brunner, and inker Tom Palmer. The same story is reprinted in the bonus pages of Silver Surfer vs. Dracula (February 1994). The character reappeared in April 2011's Deadpool Team-Up #885, written by Rick Spears, pencilled by Philip Bond and inked by Daniel Brown.

== Fictional character biography ==
Circa 1675, Bessie, a domesticated cow living in a Swiss farm, becomes the prey of Count Dracula, who is unable to find any available humans to feed on. Bessie seemingly dies and her upset owner Hans lays her to rest. Unbeknownst to Hans, Bessie has become an undead monster known as Hellcow, and rises from her grave seeking revenge on Dracula.

In the present day, Howard the Duck is investigating the deaths of four farmers in Cleveland, Ohio. Howard initially concludes that the perpetrator must be a chicken. Later, early in the morning, he disguises himself as a human. Hellcow notices him and lunges for him. A scuffle commences and Howard prevails, driving a stake through her heart and apparently ending her reign of terror.

Hellcow survives, as her head remains intact. Her corpse is recovered by insane scientist Doctor Kilgore, who revives her and attempts to use her milk to cure his tuberculosis and gain immortality. When this plan does not work, Kilgore abducts Deadpool and extracts his pituitary gland to gain his healing factor. However, the mixture of Hellcow's milk and Deadpool's gland goes awry, damaging Kilgore's mind. Deadpool and Hellcow subsequently join forces to stop him. Deadpool and Hellcow escape from Kilgore's abode, but Hellcow is instantly killed by the sunlight. Deadpool travels back to the previous comic book panel and rescues Hellcow.

== Powers and abilities ==
Before becoming a vampire, Bessie could produce more milk than the average cow and hence was well-favored by her owner. As Hellcow, she possesses characteristics tantamount to that of Dracula's, such as being able to suck blood from humans and being immortal. She could transform into a half-cow, half-bat form, and an intangible gas cloud.

== Reception ==
Numerous Internet critics have commented on the bizarre premise behind Hellcow. Bjarki Dagur of Filmophilia found Hellcow to be either "the worst idea for a character I have ever heard, or the greatest thing that has ever existed" in his 2012 article "Best/Worst: Marvel Heroes That Should/Should Never Get Movies".

== In other media ==
- Hellcow appears in Lego Marvel Super Heroes 2.
- Hellcow appears in Marvel Snap.
- Hellcow appears in Marvel Puzzle Quest.
