= Steve Gerber =

American comic writer (1947–2008)

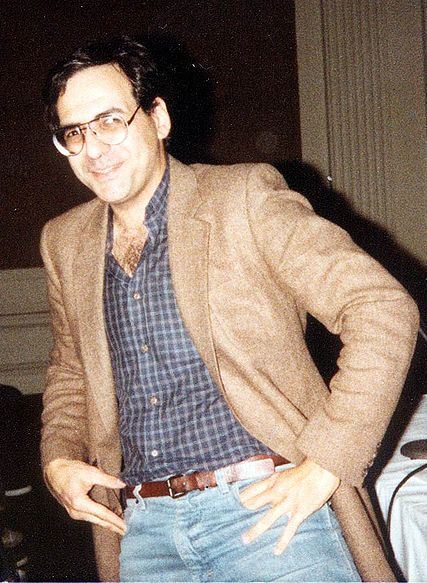
- Gerber circa 1979
- Born: Stephen Ross Gerber; September 20, 1947 St. Louis, Missouri, U.S.
- Died: February 10, 2008 (aged 60) Las Vegas, Nevada, U.S.
- Pseudonym: Reg Everbest
- Notable works: Howard the Duck; The Defenders; Man-Thing; Omega the Unknown
- Awards: Eagle Award, 1977; Inkpot Award, 1978; Will Eisner Comic Book Hall of Fame, 2010; Bill Finger Award, 2013

Stephen Ross Gerber (/ˈɡɜːrbər/; September 20, 1947 – February 10, 2008) was an American comic book writer and creator of the satiric Marvel Comics character Howard the Duck. Other works include Man-Thing, Omega the Unknown, Marvel Spotlight: "Son of Satan", The Defenders, Marvel Presents: "Guardians of the Galaxy", Daredevil and Foolkiller. Gerber often included lengthy text pages in the midst of comic book stories, such as in his graphic novel, Stewart the Rat. Gerber was posthumously inducted into the Will Eisner Comic Book Hall of Fame in 2010.

== Biography ==
=== Early life ===
Steve Gerber was born to a Jewish family in St. Louis, Missouri, the son of Bernice Gerber, and one of four children, with siblings Jon, Michael, and Lisa. A letter from Steve Gerber of "7014 Roberts Court, University City 30, Mo." was published in Fantastic Four #19 (Oct. 1963). Other letters from Steve Gerber appeared in The Amazing Spider-Man #26 (April 1965) and Captain America #118 (October 1969). After corresponding with fellow youthful comics fans Roy Thomas and Jerry Bails, and starting one of the first comics fanzines, Headline, at age 13 or 14, Gerber attended college at the University of Missouri–St. Louis, the University of Missouri in Columbia, Missouri, and St. Louis University, where he finished his communications degree.

=== Career ===
Gerber began work as a copywriter for a St. Louis advertising agency. During this time he wrote short stories, some of which, such as "And the Birds Hummed Dirges," later appeared in Crazy Magazine during his stint as editor.

In early 1972, Gerber asked Thomas, by this time Marvel editor-in-chief, about writing comics; Thomas sent him a writer's test – six pages of a Daredevil car-chase scene drawn by Gene Colan – which Gerber passed. He accepted a position as an associate editor and writer at Marvel Comics. Thomas said in 2007,

Steve and I had been in touch, off and on....I [eventually] got a letter from Steve saying, in essence, 'Help! I'm going crazy in this advertising job'....So I thought, 'Gee, he'd be a good person to get up here, so if he wants to make a change, let's give it a try'. He was brought in to be an assistant editor on staff. That didn't work out so well, because for whatever reason...he had trouble staying awake. At the time, he wasn't a staff kind of person, at least in terms of what Marvel needed, but he was a real good writer and did some interesting things...

Gerber's comics writing career at Marvel began with three comic books cover-dated December 1972: Adventure into Fear #11, The Incredible Hulk #158, and a collaboration with writer Carole Seuling on Shanna the She-Devil. Gerber initially penned superhero stories for titles such as Daredevil (20 issues), Iron Man (three issues) and Sub-Mariner (11 issues). Gerber penned adaptations of Lin Carter's barbarian sword-and-sorcery hero Thongor for Creatures on the Loose; short horror stories for Monsters Unleashed, Chamber of Chills and Journey into Mystery and humor pieces for Crazy Magazine, becoming editor of that satirical magazine for issues #11–14.

==== The Man-Thing and Howard the Duck ====
Gerber scripted one of his signature series, Man-Thing, about an empathic swamp-monster, beginning in Adventure into Fear #11 (Dec. 1972). On page 11 of that issue, he created the series' narrative tagline, used in captions: "Whatever knows fear burns at the Man-Thing's touch!" After issue #19 (Dec. 1973), Man-Thing received a solo title, which ran 22 issues (Jan. 1974 – Oct. 1975), of which issue #1 was originally intended for Adventure into Fear #20. Gerber and Mayerik introduced the original Foolkiller in issue #3 (March 1974). In the final issue, Gerber appeared as a character in the story, claiming he had not been inventing the Man-Thing's adventures but simply reporting on them and that he had decided to move on.

With penciler Val Mayerik, Gerber created Howard the Duck as a secondary character in a Man-Thing story in Adventure into Fear #19 and Man-Thing #1 (Dec. 1973 - Jan. 1974). Howard graduated to his own backup feature in Giant-Size Man-Thing #4-5, confronting such bizarre horror-parody characters as Garko the Man-Frog and Bessie the Hellcow, before acquiring his own comic-book title with Howard the Duck #1 (Jan. 1976). Gerber wrote 27 issues of the series, penciled initially by Frank Brunner and for most of its run by Gene Colan. The series developed a substantial cult following, which Marvel helped to promote by Howard's satiric entry into the 1976 U.S. presidential campaign under the auspices of the All-Night Party.

Marvel attempted a spin-off with a short-lived Howard the Duck syndicated comic strip from 1977 to 1978, initially scripted by Gerber, and drawn by Colan then Mayerik and finally Alan Kupperberg. Gerber was replaced on the strip in mid-1978, by another comic book writer, Marv Wolfman, creating acrimony. Marvel's then editor-in-chief, Jim Shooter, blamed Gerber's chronic tardiness, saying the creative team was "producing strips within six days of their publication dates," which he said caused several newspapers to drop the strip. Shooter added that while the syndicate threatened to drop the strip if a new writer were not brought in, "Steve can tell you a good number of horror stories – and they're all true – about the trouble we had getting artists."

==== Other comics work ====
Gerber often collaborated with writer Mary Skrenes. Among other Marvel projects, Gerber, Skrenes, and artist Jim Mooney created Omega the Unknown, which explored the strange link between a cosmic superhero and a boy, and wrote the first issue of Marvel Comics Super Special featuring the rock band Kiss. He created the characters Starhawk, Aleta Ogord, and (with Skrenes) Nikki for the Guardians of the Galaxy series. He scripted the adventures of Daimon Hellstrom, Morbius, and Lilith.

Gerber often revived forgotten characters. In The Defenders, he revived three pre-superhero-era characters, the Headmen. He reintroduced the 1969 one-time feature Guardians of the Galaxy, first as guest stars in Marvel Two-in-One and The Defenders, then as a feature in Marvel Presents.

Toward the end of his work at Marvel, he wrote Hanna-Barbera stories for Mark Evanier under the anagrammatic pseudonym Reg Everbest. Only two of these, featuring Magilla Gorilla and the Clue Club, were published in English.

==== Battle for Howard the Duck ====
In the first half of 1978, Gerber was fired from first the newspaper strip and then the comic book series purportedly for failure to meet deadlines. On August 29, 1980, after learning of Marvel's efforts to license Howard for use in film and broadcast media, Gerber filed a copyright infringement lawsuit against Marvel corporate parent Cadence Industries and other parties, alleging that he was the sole owner of the character.

==== DC work ====
During the mid-1970s and early 1980s, Gerber worked for DC Comics, including an issue of Metal Men, the last three issues of Mister Miracle, The Phantom Zone limited series, and a run of "Doctor Fate" backup stories in The Flash co-written with Martin Pasko. Gerber had planned to write for DC's Time Warp science fiction anthology series, but objected to the submission guidelines for that series. Gerber also wrote for independent comic companies. One of Gerber's first major works away from Marvel was the original graphic novel Stewart the Rat for Eclipse Comics, with art by Gene Colan and Tom Palmer. For Eclipse Magazine, Gerber and Mayerik created the anti-censorship horror story, "Role Model/Caring, Sharing, and Helping Others".

==== Resolution of the court case ====
In 1981 he teamed with Jack Kirby at Eclipse to create Destroyer Duck, a satirical comic created to raise funds for his court case against Marvel.

The lawsuit was settled on September 24, 1982. Gerber acknowledged that his work on the character had been done as work-for-hire and that Marvel parent Cadence Industries owned "all right, title and interest" to Howard the Duck and related material. On November 5, 1982, Judge David Kenyon approved the motion and dismissed the case.

==== 1980s and 1990s career ====
In the early 1980s, Gerber and Frank Miller made a joint proposal to revamp DC's three biggest characters, namely Superman, Batman and Wonder Woman. The proposal was not accepted.

Gerber was slated to write a new Spectre series in 1986, but he missed the deadline for the first issue so that he could watch the last day of shooting on the Howard the Duck film and DC assigned another writer to the series in response.

After Marvel had cancelled his contract in May 1978, Gerber scripted assorted free-lance projects for Marvel, including the controversial creator-owned book Void Indigo (1984) for Epic Comics, a serialized, eight-page Man-Thing feature in the anthology series Marvel Comics Presents (Sept. 1988–Feb. 1989), The Legion of Night and the 1991 Suburban Jersey Ninja She-Devils one-shot issue. For DC, his works include A. Bizarro. At Marvel, Gerber scripted a 12-issue run on The Sensational She-Hulk (several issues of which guest-starred Howard the Duck). He also scripted three issues of Cloak and Dagger, a Hawkeye story in Avengers Spotlight, and two issues of Toxic Crusaders. During this time he did a serial in Marvel Comics Presents featuring Poison, a character he had created in "The Evolutionary War" crossover. He scripted a A Nightmare on Elm Street black and white magazine format comic book which detailed the backstory of the character of Freddy Krueger.

==== Television work ====
In collaboration with Beth Woods (later Slick), Gerber wrote the "Contagion" episode of the syndicated television series Star Trek: The Next Generation.

Gerber's work in television animation included story editor duties on The Transformers, G.I. Joe and Dungeons & Dragons; creating Thundarr the Barbarian; and sharing a 1998 Daytime Emmy Award for Outstanding Special Class – Animated Program, for the WB program The New Batman/Superman Adventures.

==== Ultraverse ====
He was one of the founders of the Malibu Comics superhero setting the Ultraverse and co-created Sludge and Exiles. For Image Comics, he co-created The Cybernary with Nick Manabat and disbanded Codename: Strykeforce, in addition to guest-writing Pitt.

==== 2000s work ====
In 2002, he wrote a new Howard the Duck miniseries for Marvel's MAX line. For DC, he created Nevada for the Vertigo imprint in 1998 with artist Phil Winslade and Hard Time with long-time collaborator Mary Skrenes, which outlasted the short-lived imprint DC Focus, but slow sales led Hard Time: Season Two to be cancelled after only seven issues.

Later, Gerber wrote the Helmet of Fate: Zauriel one-shot and continued writing the Doctor Fate serial in the Countdown to Mystery limited series for DC Comics up to the time of his death, working on stories in the hospital. Gerber died before being able to write the concluding chapter of the serial; in his honor, four separate writers (Adam Beechen, Mark Evanier, Gail Simone, and Mark Waid) provided their own conclusions to the story.

In 2010, Comics Bulletin ranked Gerber's run on The Defenders first on its list of the "Top 10 1970s Marvels", while Omega the Unknown was 10th on the same list.

Gerber's posthumous Man-Thing story "The Screenplay of the Living Dead Man", with art by Kevin Nowlan, originally planned as a 1980s graphic novel before being left uncompleted by the artist, was revived in the 2010s and appeared as a three-issue miniseries cover-titled The Infernal Man-Thing (early Sept.-Oct. 2012). The story was a sequel to Gerber's "Song-Cry of the Living Dead Man" from Man-Thing #12 (Dec. 1974).

=== Death ===
In 2007, Gerber was diagnosed with an early stage of idiopathic pulmonary fibrosis, and was eventually hospitalized while continuing to work. He had gotten onto the waiting list for a lung transplant at UCLA Medical Center. On February 10, 2008, Gerber died in a Las Vegas hospital from complications stemming from his condition. His final comics work was writing Countdown to Mystery: Doctor Fate for DC Comics, having briefly worked with a version of the character in 1982.

At the time of his death, Gerber was separated from his wife, Margo Macleod. He had a daughter, Samantha Gerber.

== In fiction ==
Gerber used the anagrammatic Reg Everbest pseudonym for Marvel-published Hanna-Barbera stories after he was banned from Marvel by Jim Shooter. Echoing that pseudonym, Roger Stern named the original, deceased Foolkiller "Ross G. Everbest" in The Amazing Spider-Man #225, in homage to Gerber, who had created the character, using Gerber's middle name as the character's first name, the middle initial restoring the anagram save for a silent e. The character's real name had never appeared in the two Gerber stories, but is seen on a computer screen in the second Foolkiller's van, next to the face of the original user of that identity.

The Marvel Universe villain Thundersword (by Jim Shooter, Al Milgrom and Steve Leialoha) is considered a parody of Gerber and his creation Thundarr the Barbarian. Stewart Cadwall is a TV scriptwriter who acquires superpowers, becomes Thundersword and fights the current state of the media.

== Awards and nominations ==
- 1977: Eagle Award for Favourite Single Comicbook Story for Howard the Duck #3: "Four Feathers of Death", with artist John Buscema
- 1977: Also nominated for same award for Howard the Duck #1: "Howard the Barbarian", with artist Frank Brunner
- 1977: Nominated for Eagle Award for Favourite Comicbook Writer
- 1977: Nominated for Eagle Award for Favourite Continued Comicbook Story for The Defenders #31–40 and The Defenders Annual #1, with artist Sal Buscema
- 1977: Eagle Award for Howard the Duck as Favourite Comicbook – Humour
- 1977: Eagle Award for Howard the Duck as Favourite New Comic Title
- 1977: Howard the Duck nominated for Eagle Award for Favourite Comicbook Character
- 1978: Inkpot Award
- 1978: Nominated for Eagle Award for Favourite Comicbook Writer
- 1978: Nominated for Eagle Award for Favourite Single Comicbook Story for Howard the Duck #16: "The Zen and Art of Comic Book Writing"
- 1978: Beverly Switzler nominated for Eagle Award for Favourite Supporting Character
- 1978: Howard the Duck nominated for Eagle Award Roll of Honour
- 1979: Nominated for Eagle Award for Best Comicbook Writer (US)
- 1979: Howard the Duck nominated for Eagle Award Favourite Character (US)
- 1979: Doctor Bong nominated for Eagle Award for Favourite Villain
- 1979: Beverly Switzler nominated for Eagle Award for Favourite Supporting Character
- 1979: Nominated for Eagle Award for Favourite Single Story for The Avengers #178: "The Martyr Perplex", with artist Carmine Infantino
- 1979: Nominated for Eagle Award Roll of Honour
- 1980: Nominated for Eagle Award Roll of Honour
- 2002: Nominated for Bram Stoker Award for Best Illustrated Narrative for Howard the Duck vol. 2, #1–6
- 2010: Inducted into the Will Eisner Comic Book Hall of Fame
- 2013: Received the Bill Finger Award

== Bibliography ==
=== Comic books ===
==== DC Comics ====
- A. Bizarro #1–4 (1999)
- Countdown to Mystery #1–7 (Doctor Fate) (2007–2008)
- DC Comics Presents #97 (1986)
- The Flash #310–313 (Doctor Fate backup stories, reprinted in The Immortal Doctor Fate #3) (1982)
- Hard Time #1–12 (2004–2005)
- Hard Time: Season Two #1–7 (with Mary Skrenes; the first issue noted that she was denied credit on the first series) (2006)
- Heartthrobs #4 (1999)
- Helmet of Fate: Zauriel #1 (2007)
- Metal Men #45 (1976)
- Mister Miracle #23–25 (1978)
- Nevada #1–6 (1998)
- The Phantom Zone #1–4 (1982)
- Superman: Last Son of Earth #1–2 (2000)
- Superman: Last Stand on Krypton #1 (the sequel to Superman: Last Son of Earth) (2003)
- Vertigo: Winter's Edge #1–2 (Nevada stories; Leonard the Duck cameo) (1998–1999)
- Weird War Tales #80 (1979)

==== Eclipse Comics ====
- Destroyer Duck #1–5 (1982–1983) (also editor in #6–7)
- Eclipse: The Magazine #2–3 (1981) ("Role Model: Caring, Sharing, and Helping Others" (horror story))
- Miracleman Book One (introduction only) (1988)
- Stewart the Rat graphic novel (1980)
- Total Eclipse #3 (1988) (Tachyon backup; first appearance)

==== Image Comics ====
- Codename: Strykeforce #10–14 (1995)
- Cyberforce, Strykeforce; Opposing Forces #1–2 (1995)
- Cybernary #1–5 (1995–1996)
- Deathblow #1–4 (Cybernary backup stories) (1993–1994)
- Pitt #9–10 (1995)
- Savage Dragon / Destroyer Duck #1 (1996)

==== Malibu Comics ====
- Exiles #1–4 (1993)
- Sludge #1–3, 6–11 (1993–1994)
- Sludge Red X-Mas #1 (1994)

==== Marvel Comics ====
- Adventure into Fear #11–19 (the Man-Thing), #21–25 (Morbius) (1972–1974)
- Avengers Spotlight #30–34, 36 (Hawkeye) (1990)
- The Avengers #178 (the Beast) (1978)
- Captain America #157, 221–223, 225 (1973–1978)
- Chamber of Chills #2 (1973) "Thirst"
- Cloak and Dagger (vol. 3) #14–16 (1990–1991)
- Crazy Magazine #2–14 (1974–1975)
- Creatures on the Loose #28–29 (Thongor, Lin Carter adaptation) (1974)
- Daredevil #97–101, 103–117 (1973–1975)
- The Defenders #20–29, 31–41, Annual #1 (1975–1976)
- Dracula Lives #1–2, 6, 10–11 (1973–1975)
- Foolkiller #1–10 (1990–1991)
- A Nightmare on Elm Street (comics) #1–2 (1989)
- Giant-Size Defenders #3–5 (1975)
- Giant-Size Man-Thing #1–5 (1974–1975)
- Haunt of Horror #1–3 (1974) ("In the Shadows of the City;" 2-part round-table discussion of The Exorcist)
- Howard the Duck #1–29, Annual #1 (1976–1979)
- Howard the Duck (vol. 2) #1–6 (2002)
- The Incredible Hulk #158 (1972)
- The Infernal Man-Thing #1–3 (2012)
- Iron Man #56–58, Annual #3 (1973–1976)
- Journey into Mystery (vol. 2) #4 (1973) ("The Price Is Flight!")
- The Legion of Night #1–2 (1991)
- Man-Thing #1–22 (1974–1975)
- Marvel Comics Presents #1–12 (Man-Thing serial), #60–67 (Poison serial) (1988–1990)
- Marvel Comics Super Special #1 (KISS) (1977)
- Marvel Fanfare #56–59 (Shanna the She-Devil) (1991)
- Marvel Graphic Novel #11 (Void Indigo) (1984)
- Marvel Presents #3–7, 9 (Guardians of the Galaxy) (with Mary Skrenes) (1976–1977)
- Marvel Preview #12, 16 (Lilith, Daughter of Dracula) (1977–1978)
- Marvel Spotlight #14–23 (Daimon Hellstrom, the Son of Satan) (1974–1975)
- Marvel Treasury Edition #12 (Howard the Duck; The Defenders) (1976)
- Marvel Two-in-One #1–9 (1974–1975) (tying in with his Man-Thing, Sub-Mariner, Daredevil/Shanna the She-Devil and Guardians of the Galaxy/Defenders storylines; plus Ghost Rider and Thor)
- Midnight Sons Unlimited #9 (1995) (The Legion of Night)
- Monsters Unleashed #4, 8–9 (1974) (Golem story; Man-Thing prose story, "Several Meaningless Deaths")
- Omega the Unknown #1–6, 9–10 (with Mary Skrenes) (1976–1977)
- The Rampaging Hulk #7–9 (1978) (backups starring the Man-Thing, Ulysses Bloodstone and Shanna the She-Devil, respectively)
- Sensational She-Hulk #10–11, 13–23 (1990–1991)
- Shanna the She-Devil #1, 4–5 (1972–1973)
- Spider-Man Team-Up #5 (1996)
- Spoof #3–4 (1973) ("The Part-Rich Family" and "What If Famous People Were Santa Claus?")
- Spotlight #4 (Magilla Gorilla) (1979)
- Sub-Mariner #58–69 (1973–1974)
- Suburban Jersey Ninja She-Devils #1 (1991)
- Supernatural Thrillers #5, 7 (N'Kantu, the Living Mummy) (1974)
- Tales of the Zombie #1–8, Annual #1 [all reprints] (1973–1975); also letter response in #10
- Toxic Crusaders #3, 5 (1992)
- TV Stars #4 (the Clue Club) (1979)
- Vampire Tales #1, 6 (Morbius and Lilith, respectively) (1973–1974)
- Void Indigo #1–2 (1984–1985)
- Web of Spider-Man Annual #4 (1988) (featuring the Man-Thing and introducing Poison)

==== Star*Reach ====
- Quack #2 (1977) (assistance with Alan Kupperberg story)

== Television credits ==
(Series head writer denoted in bold)

- The Plastic Man Comedy/Adventure Show (1979)
- **Thundarr the Barbarian** (1980–1981)
- **Goldie Gold and Action Jack** (1981)
- The Scooby & Scrappy-Doo/Puppy Hour (1982)
- Dungeons & Dragons (1983)
- Mister T (1983)
- **G.I. Joe: A Real American Hero** (1985): season 1 head writer
- **The Transformers** (1986–1987): season 3 head writer
- Superman (1988)
- Star Trek: The Next Generation (1989)
- Superman: The Animated Series (1997)
- The New Batman Adventures (1997)
- Yu-Gi-Oh! (2000)

Preceded by Gerry Conway	Man-Thing writer 1972–1975	Succeeded by Michael Fleisher (in 1979)
Preceded by Mike Friedrich	Iron Man writer 1973	Succeeded by Mike Friedrich
Preceded by Gerry Conway	Daredevil writer 1973–1975 (#102 and #118 by Chris Claremont)	Succeeded by Tony Isabella
Preceded by Len Wein	The Defenders writer 1975–1976	Succeeded by Gerry Conway
Preceded by n/a	Howard the Duck writer 1976–1979	Succeeded by Bill Mantlo
Preceded by Donald F. Glut	Captain America writer 1978	Succeeded by Roger McKenzie
