= Stewart the Rat =

1980 graphic novel

- Date: 1980
- Publisher: Eclipse Enterprises

Creative team
- Creator: Steve Gerber

Stewart the Rat is a graphic novel written by Steve Gerber, penciled by Gene Colan, and inked by Tom Palmer. It was published in November 1980 by Eclipse Enterprises. Stewart the Rat was reprinted in January 2003 by About Comics.
