= 1986 Stinkers Bad Movie Awards =

9th Award ceremony by the Stinkers Bad Movie Awards

The 9th Stinkers Bad Movie Awards were released by the Hastings Bad Cinema Society in 1987 to honour the worst films the film industry had to offer in 1986. As follows, there was only a Worst Picture category with provided commentary for each nominee, as well as a list of films that were also considered for the final list but ultimately failed to make the cut (27 films total).

== Worst Picture Ballot ==
Film	Production company(s)
Howard the Duck	Universal Pictures
Band of the Hand	TriStar Pictures
The Care Bears Movie II: A New Generation	Columbia Pictures
Shanghai Surprise	Handmade Films, MGM
Under the Cherry Moon	Warner Bros.

=== Dishonourable Mentions ===
- Big Trouble in Little China (Fox)
- Blue City (Paramount)
- The Clan of the Cave Bear (Warner Bros.)
- Club Paradise (Warner Bros.)
- Cobra (Warner Bros.)
- 8 Million Ways to Die (TriStar)
- The Golden Child (Paramount)
- Hamburger: The Motion Picture (F/M Entertainment)
- Hardbodies 2 (CineTel)
- Haunted Honeymoon (Orion)
- Invaders from Mars (Cannon)
- Jo Jo Dancer, Your Life Is Calling (Columbia Pictures)
- Jumpin' Jack Flash (Fox)
- The Karate Kid Part II (Columbia Pictures)
- King Kong Lives (De Laurentiis)
- Little Shop of Horrors (Warner Bros.)
- Maximum Overdrive (De Laurentiis)
- 9½ Weeks (MGM/UA)
- Police Academy 3: Back in Training (Warner Bros.)
- Poltergeist II: The Other Side (MGM)
- Psycho III (Universal Pictures)
- Ratboy (Warner Bros.)
- Short Circuit (TriStar)
- Tai-Pan (De Laurentiis)
- The Texas Chainsaw Massacre 2 (Cannon)
- Vamp (New World)
- The Whoopee Boys (Paramount)
