= Destroyer Duck =

1982 anthology comic book

- Cover to Destroyer Duck #5 by Jack Kirby and Alfred Alcala.

Publication information
- Publisher: Eclipse Comics; Image Comics
- Genre: Action; Satire
- Publication date: 1982

Creative team
- Created by: Steve Gerber; Jack Kirby
- Written by: Steve Gerber (issues #1-5); Buzz Dixon (issues #6-7)
- Penciller(s): Jack Kirby (issues #1-5); Gary Kato (issues #6-7)
- Inker(s): Alfred Alcala (issues #1-7); Steve Leialoha (issue #1)
- Letterer(s): Tom Orzechowski (issues #1-2); Adam Kubert (issue #3); Ken Bruzenak (issue #4); Peter Iro (issue #5); Gary Kato (issues #6-7)

Destroyer Duck was an anthology comic book published by Eclipse Comics in 1982, as well as the title of its primary story, written by Steve Gerber and featuring artwork by Jack Kirby and Alfredo Alcala.

The book was published as a way to help Gerber raise funds for a lawsuit he was embroiled in at the time, in which he was battling industry giant Marvel Comics over the ownership of the character Howard the Duck, which Gerber created for the company in 1973.

== Overview ==
The main story of the comic told of Louis "Duke" Duck, a resident of a typical anthropomorphic comic-book world, who witnessed his best friend, identified only as "The Little Guy" or "TLG", vanish into thin air before his eyes. Some years later, TLG reappeared only to die at Duke's feet—but not before telling the tale of how he was exploited and destroyed by a thoughtless conglomeration, "Godcorp." Swearing revenge, Duke vowed to take down Godcorp no matter what the cost.

Subsequent Destroyer Duck tales would reveal that the Little Guy who died at Duke's feet was in fact a clone, and the original was still held captive by Godcorp; eventually, Gerber (by that point on better terms with Marvel, the lawsuit having long since been settled) revealed that The Little Guy's real name was actually "Leonard" - a new duck character who, for all intents and purposes, was identical in every way (except in name and character ownership) to Howard.

The stories introduced sentient scented dolls and Wobblina Strangelegs, who nearly got her own one-shot. After five issues, Gerber gave up writing the title, but remained its editor. Buzz Dixon wrote the last two issues, about a STD-infected parody of Gilligan’s Island. Frank Miller drew the cover of the final issue. The seven issues of the comic were published very sporadically.

Issue #1 of the original Destroyer Duck series, labeled the "Special Lawsuit Benefit Edition", is notable for containing the first appearance of Sergio Aragonés’s Groo the Wanderer and also featuring additional stories by Mark Evanier, Dan Spiegle, Shary Flenniken, Martin Pasko, and Joe Staton. The rest of the series contained the back-up feature The Starling, written by Superman co-creator Jerry Siegel, with art by Val Mayerik.

In 1994, while Gerber was working at Image for Top Cow Studio on Codename: Strykeforce, Gerber planned for issue #14 to include Destroyer Duck. At the last minute, Marc Silvestri declined, forcing Gerber and his editor, David Wohl, to revise the story. Destroyer Duck does not appear as such in the story, but Gerber introduces Specimen Q, a mysterious character imprisoned in his armor who is Destroyer Duck, as revealed in the Savage Dragon/Destroyer Duck one-shot in 1996.
