= Howard the Duck (film) =

1986 American superhero comedy film by Willard Huyck

- Theatrical release poster
- Directed by: Willard Huyck
- Written by: Willard Huyck; Gloria Katz
- Based on: Howard the Duck by Steve Gerber
- Produced by: Gloria Katz
- Starring: Lea Thompson; Jeffrey Jones; Tim Robbins
- Cinematography: Richard H. Kline
- Edited by: Michael Chandler; Sidney Wolinsky
- Music by: John Barry; Sylvester Levay; Songs: Thomas Dolby
- Production companies: Lucasfilm; Marvel Comics Group
- Distributed by: Universal Pictures
- Release date: August 1, 1986
- Running time: 111 minutes
- Country: United States
- Language: English
- Budget: $30–37 million
- Box office: $38 million

Howard the Duck (released in the United Kingdom as Howard... A New Breed of Hero) is a 1986 American superhero comedy film directed by Willard Huyck and starring Lea Thompson, Jeffrey Jones and Tim Robbins. Based on the Marvel Comics character Howard the Duck, the film was produced by Gloria Katz and written by Huyck and Katz, with George Lucas as executive producer. The screenplay was originally intended to be an animated film, but the film adaptation became live-action because of a contractual obligation. While several TV adaptations of Marvel characters were aired, this was the first theatrical release since the Captain America serial of 1944.

Lucas proposed adapting the comic book following the production of American Graffiti (1973). After multiple production difficulties and mixed response to test screenings, Howard the Duck was released in theaters on August 1, 1986. Upon its release, the film was a critical and commercial failure and was panned for its humor, performances, inconsistent tone, and appearance of the title character, though the cast performances, effects and soundtrack were mostly praised. In the years since, it has been considered among the worst films ever made, but has also developed a cult following. It was nominated for seven Golden Raspberry Awards (winning four), and made about US $16.3 million domestically compared to its US $30–37 million budget.

== Plot ==
On Duckworld, an Earth-like planet inhabited by anthropomorphic ducks, Howard the Duck is propelled out of his apartment building and into outer space; he lands on Earth, in Cleveland, Ohio. Upon arriving, he encounters a woman being attacked by thugs, whom he defeats using a unique style of martial arts. The woman, Beverly Switzler, takes Howard to her apartment and lets him spend the night.

The following day, Beverly takes Howard to Phil Blumburtt, a scientist who Beverly hopes can help Howard return to his world. When Phil is revealed to be only a lab assistant, Howard resigns himself to life on Earth and rejects Beverly's aid. He gets a job as a janitor at a romance spa, but eventually quits and returns to Beverly, who plays in a band called Cherry Bomb. At the club where Cherry Bomb is performing, Howard confronts their manager when he insults the band and plans to coerce Beverly. A fight breaks out, which Howard wins.

Howard rejoins Beverly backstage and accompanies her back to her apartment, where Beverly persuades him to be the band's new manager. The two flirt and get into bed, but they are interrupted by Phil and two of his colleagues, who reveal that a laser spectroscope they were inventing was aimed at Howard's planet and transported him to Earth when it was activated. They theorize that Howard can be sent back to his world through a reversal of this process.

Upon their arrival at the laboratory, the laser spectroscope malfunctions, raising the possibility of something else being transported to Earth. At this point, Dr. Walter Jenning is possessed by a life form from a distant region of space. When they visit a diner, the creature introduces himself as a "Dark Overlord of the Universe" and demonstrates his developing mental powers by destroying the table, utensils, and condiments. A fight ensues when a group of truckers in the diner insults Howard. He is captured and is almost killed by the diner chef, but the Dark Overlord destroys the diner and escapes with Beverly.

Howard locates Phil, and they discover an ultralight aircraft, which they use to search for the Dark Overlord and Beverly. At the laboratory, the Dark Overlord plans to transfer another of his kind into Beverly's body with the dimension machine. Howard and Phil arrive and seemingly destroy the Dark Overlord with an experimental neutron disintegrator, but the creature is merely forced out of Jenning's body and attacks them in its true form. Howard fires the neutron disintegrator at the beast, obliterating him. He then destroys the laser spectroscope to seal off Earth from any further invasions, sacrificing his only way back to Duckworld in the process. In the aftermath, Howard takes on the roles of Beverly's manager and tour partner, with Phil joining them as part of the crew.

== Cast ==
- Ed Gale as Howard the Duck (suit performer)
  - Jordan Prentice as Howard the Duck (additional suit performer)
  - Tim Rose, Steve Sleap, Peter Baird, Mary Wells and Lisa Sturz as Howard the Duck (puppeteers)
  - Chip Zien as Howard the Duck (voice)
- Lea Thompson as Beverly Switzler
- Tim Robbins as Phil Blumburtt
- Jeffrey Jones as Dr. Walter Jenning
- David Paymer as Larry
- Paul Guilfoyle as Lieutenant Welker
- Liz Sagal as Ronette
- Dominique Davalos as Cal
- Holly Robinson as K.C.
- Tommy Swerdlow as Ginger Moss
- Richard Edson as Ritchie
- Miles Chapin as Carter
- Paul Comi as Dr. Chapin
- Richard McGonagle as First Cop
- Virginia Capers as Coramae
- Miguel Sandoval as Bar Entertainment Supervisor
- William Hall as Officer Hanson
- Richard Kiley as The Cosmos (voice)
- John Fleck as Pimples

Thomas Dolby, who composed the songs for the film, has a cameo as a bartender. Future Nirvana and Foo Fighters guitarist Pat Smear appears as an extra.

== Production ==
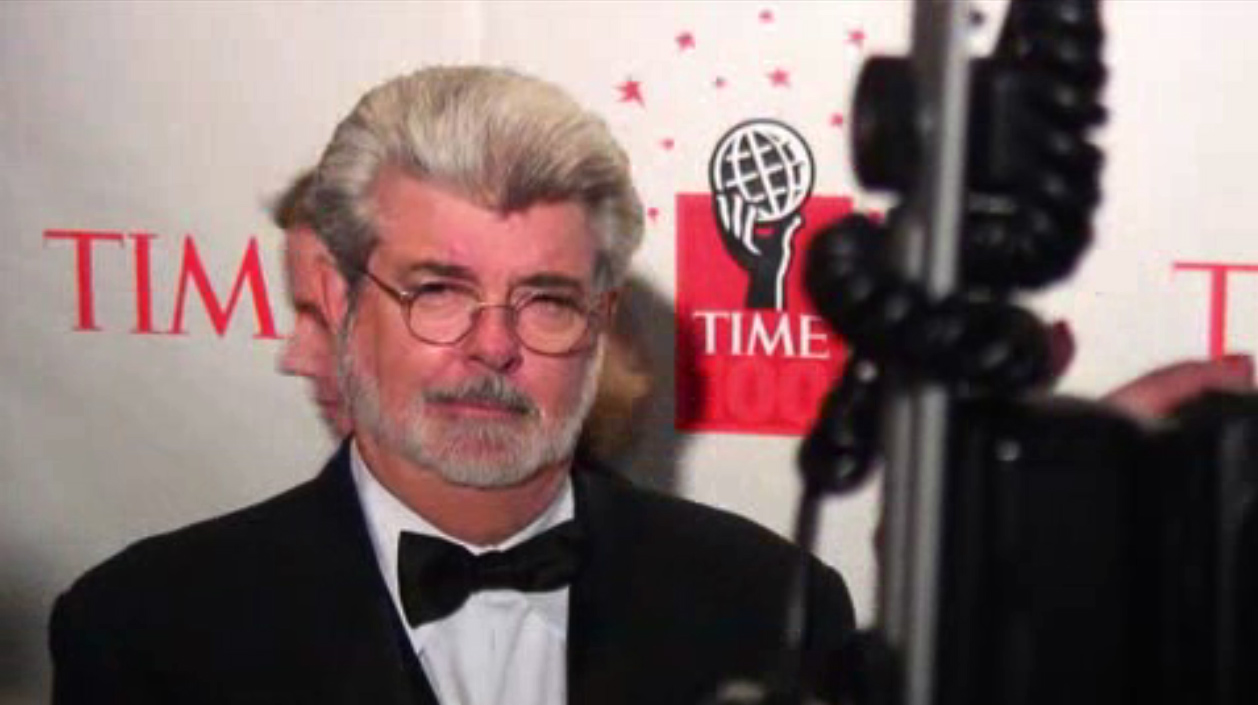
George Lucas stepped down as the president of Lucasfilm to focus on producing films, including Howard the Duck.

George Lucas attended film school with Willard Huyck and Gloria Katz, who later co-wrote American Graffiti with Lucas. After the film's production concluded, Lucas told Huyck and Katz about the comic book Howard the Duck, primarily written by Steve Gerber, describing the series as being "very funny" and praising its elements of film noir and absurdism. In 1984, Lucas relinquished his presidency of Lucasfilm to focus on producing films. Lucas wanted John Landis to direct the film, but Landis declined. According to the documentary A Look Back at Howard the Duck, Huyck, Katz and Lucas began to seriously consider adapting Howard the Duck as a film, and met with Gerber to discuss the project. Steve Gerber's account differs slightly; he recalls that at the time he was approached to discuss the film, Lucas was not yet involved with the project.

The film was optioned by Universal Studios after a partnership with Marvel Comics. According to Marvin Antonowsky, "Sidney [Sheinberg] lobbied very hard for Howard the Duck", because the studio had passed on previous projects in which Lucas was involved, which had been very successful. Sheinberg denied any involvement in Howard the Duck, claiming that he never read the screenplay. Huyck and Katz strongly felt that the film should be animated. Because Universal needed a film for a summer release and thinking that animating the film would take too long or cost too much, Lucas suggested that the film could be produced in live-action, with special effects created by Industrial Light & Magic.

Production designer Peter Jamison and director of photography Richard H. Kline were hired to give the film a look similar to that of a color comic book. Throughout the shoot, Huyck shot multiple segments establishing Duckworld, designed by Jamison. In the opening shot, the skyline displayed could easily be New York City, but the two moons visible in the sky (at similar angles from one another as the two suns of Tatooine in the original Star Wars film). Howard the Duck's apartment is filled with detailed props, including books and magazines featuring duck-oriented puns. Because Lucas often worked with dwarf actors, he was able to hire several extras to work on these sequences.

Though Gerber's schedule generally prevented him from being present during the shooting, he chose to miss the deadline on the first issue of The Spectre so he could watch the final day.

=== Development ===
Huyck and Katz began to develop ideas. Early on in production, it was decided that the personality of the character would be changed from that of the comics, in which Howard was rude and obnoxious, to make the character nicer. Gerber read over the script and offered his comments and suggestions. In addition, Huyck and Katz met with Gerber to discuss a horror sequence with which they were having difficulty.

During the screenwriting process, a stronger emphasis was placed on special effects, rather than satire or narrative. The tone of the film is in diametric opposition to the comics, which Gerber described as an existential joke: "'This is no joke!' There it is. The cosmic giggle. The funniest gag in the universe. Life's most serious moments and most incredibly dumb moments are often distinguishable only by a momentary point of view. Anyone who doesn't believe this probably cannot enjoy reading Howard the Duck." Regarding the film's approach to the source material, Katz declared, "It's a film about a duck from outer space [...] It's not supposed to be an existential experience [...] We're supposed to have fun with this concept, but for some reason, reviewers weren't able to get over that problem." Despite this, after shooting had wrapped, Gerber stated that he felt the film was faithful to both the spirit of his comics and the characters of Howard and Beverly.

An early proposed storyline involved the character being transported to Hawaii. Huyck states that this storyline was considered because "we thought it would be sort of fun to shoot there". According to Katz, they did not want to explain how Howard arrived on Earth initially, but later rewrote the screenplay so that the film would begin on Howard's homeworld. Huyck and Katz wanted to incorporate both lighter, humorous elements and darker, suspenseful elements. Katz states that some readers were confused by the sexual elements of the screenplay, as they were unsure as to whether the film was intended for adults or children. Huyck and Katz wrote the ending, leaving the story open for a sequel, which was never produced.

=== Adaptation ===
The film was originally intended to be animated based on the character created by Steve Gerber and quoting scripts by Bill Mantlo. In particular, the "Duckworld" story of Howard the Duck magazine #6 was to serve as a basis for the script. A contractual obligation required Lucas to provide a distributor with a live-action film, so he decided to make the film using live actors and to use special effects for Howard. Katz said that an animated film "would have taken too much time and too much money."

The script significantly altered the personality of the title character, played the story straight instead of as a satire, removed the surrealist elements, and added supernatural elements that could highlight special effects work done by Lucas' Industrial Light & Magic. The filmmakers consulted with Disney's lawyers to make sure Howard did not resemble the Disney character Donald Duck too closely. Howard's appearance was redesigned several times during the process, including his clothes and the shape of his bill.

The film's screenplay was adapted into comic book format by the writer Danny Fingeroth and artist Kyle Baker for Marvel Comics. The adaptation appeared in both Marvel Super Special #41 and in a three-issue limited series.

=== Casting ===
After auditioning several actresses, singers, and models for the role of Beverly Switzler, including Tori Amos, Lea Thompson was cast due to her appearance in Back to the Future. Thompson purchased clothing from thrift stores because she wanted to appear at the audition as "a cross between Madonna and Cyndi Lauper." During the shoot, Thompson complained that the filmmakers chose to shoot Howard's close-up before hers. Thompson also states that she regrets not wearing a wig, as her hairstyle took two hours a day to prepare. Jeffrey Jones was cast because of his performance in Amadeus. Although Tim Robbins had no prior film experience, Huyck and Katz were confident that he was right for the part of Phil Blumburtt.

Robbins said in a later interview that he doesn't look back negatively at the film as he "got this big job that was paying a really decent salary and it was for George Lucas [...] so it was a huge deal at the time. And then it wound up going over its shooting schedule, and I ended up getting paid twice for that movie because of all the overtime." Robbins admitted that he thinks more about the money he made than the quality of the film.

To play the physical role of Howard, Huyck and Katz held casting calls with dwarf actors, eventually casting child actor Jordan Prentice and hiring Ed Gale, who had been rejected because he was too tall for the role, to perform stunts and play the role during evening shoots. Prentice found the shooting conditions to be too difficult to handle, and the film's editors were unable to match day and evening sequences because of the difference in the two portrayals. Because Gale also served as an understudy, he took over the role.

Although many actors and comedians wanted to voice Howard such as Jay Leno, they were all turned down; Huyck and Katz auditioned several actors including John Cusack, Robin Williams and Martin Short for Howard's voice. Williams worked for a week before quitting, stating, "I can't do this. It is insane. I can't get the rhythm of this. I am being confined. I am being handcuffed to match the flapping duck's bill." As a result, Chip Zien was cast because the filmmakers felt his nasal voice suited the part. Because Howard's voice was not cast until the film had begun editing, synchronization was extremely difficult.

=== Filming ===
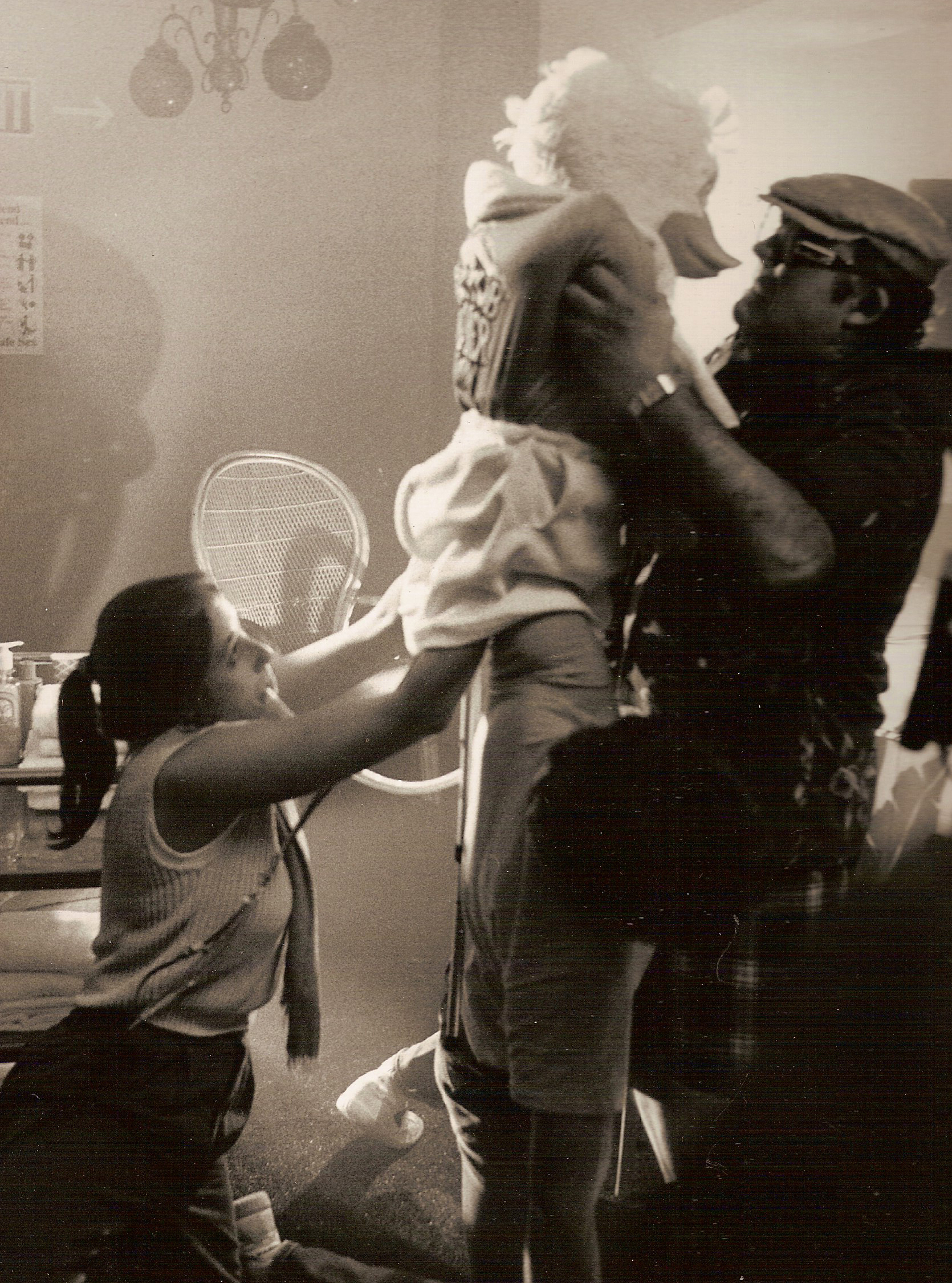
Lisa Sturz during the filming of the film

Principal photography began on November 11, 1985, and wrapped on March 27, 1986. Jeffrey Jones altered his voice for Dr. Walter Jenning after the character's possession by the Dark Overlord, which he demonstrated when interviewed by Dallas-Fort Worth reporter Bobbie Wygant.

The ultralight sequence was difficult, requiring intense coordination and actors Robbins and Gale to actually fly the plane. The location scout was stumped for a location for the sequence; after she described what she was looking for, a telephone repairman working in her office in San Francisco suggested Petaluma, California for the scene. Because of the limited shooting time, a third unit was hired to speed up the process. The climax was shot in a naval installation in San Francisco, where conditions were cold throughout. The film cost an estimated US$30–36 million to produce.

=== Special effects ===
Howard was initially intended to be a fully computerized character, but these attempts proved unsuccessful. The idea of fully puppeteering Howard was explored, but the filmmakers determined they would need an actor in a suit to portray him for much of the film. Lucasfilm built animatronic suits, costumes and puppets. Because of the limited preparation time, the varied "ducks" created for the film would explode or lose feathers, and multiple ducks were built with the wrong proportions. On the first day of shooting, the crew realized the poor quality when they found that the inside of the puppet's neck was visible when its mouth opened. Huyck repeatedly reshot scenes involving Howard as the animatronics were improved. Because multiple puppeteers were in charge of controlling different parts of the animatronic body, Huyck was unable to coordinate the shoot properly. The opening sequence, in which Howard's chair is propelled out of his apartment, used wires that were later digitally erased by a computer. This was the first use of this technique, which soon became popular and was used in films such as Back to the Future Part II (1989), Terminator 2: Judgment Day (1991) and The Matrix (1999). The effect of the feathers on Howard's head becoming erect during the love sequence took months to prepare.

The voice of Howard, Chip Zien, was not cast until after the shooting was completed. Because Gale's voice was difficult to hear through the suit, Huyck ordered Gale to perform his scenes without speaking any of the required dialogue, which was later synchronized during the editing process. Lead puppeteer Tim Rose was given a microphone attached to a small speaker, which would allow Rose to speak the dialogue to help the actors respond to Howard's dialogue. While wearing his suit, Gale could only see through Howard's mouth and had to sense his location without proper eyesight. Gale often had to walk backward before beginning rehearsals. In between takes, a hair dryer was stuffed in Howard's bill to keep Gale cool. Gale taped two of his fingers together to wear the three-fingered hands created for the Howard costume. A total of six actors gave physical performances as Howard.

Gerber was impressed by Howard's appearance, and commented, "It was very bizarre to meet it and [...] realize not just that I created it – that would have been bizarre enough [...] you know, it was sort of like meeting a child I didn't know I had".

Makeup artists Tom Burman and Bari Dreiband-Burman and actor Jones discussed the appearance of the Dark Overlord with Huyck and Katz and developed the character's progressing looks. When Katz's daughter visited during filming, she was terrified by Jones's appearance in makeup. The diner sequence combines practical effects, including squibs and air cannons, with visual effects created by ILM. Jones provided the altered voice of Jenning during his possession by the Dark Overlord "with a slight bit of enhancement now and then" by sound designer Ben Burtt. Stop motion effects during the climax were designed by Phil Tippett, who began with a clay model before upgrading to more sophisticated pieces.

== Soundtrack ==
Howard the Duck (Music from the Motion Picture Soundtrack)

Soundtrack album by John Barry
- Released: 1986
- Genres: Electronic; rock; film score
- Length: 37:26 (original release); 213:42 (2019 expansion)
- Labels: MCA (original), Intrada Records (expansion)

The film's score was written by John Barry, although some of it was replaced by material composed by Sylvester Levay (most notably the music for the scene where Howard and Phil fly the ultralight—Barry's original cue is heard on the soundtrack album). Thomas Dolby wrote the film's songs and chose the members of Cherry Bomb. Actress Lea Thompson performed her own singing for the role, although she states that the filmmakers were unsure as to whether they would keep her vocals in the final film. Thompson was required to learn choreography with the band and record the songs so they could be synchronized during filming. The final sequence, in which Cherry Bomb performs the film's title song, was shot in front of a live audience at The Warfield in San Francisco. The song was co-written by Dolby, Allee Willis, and George Clinton. Gale was choreographed to dance and play guitar as Howard. Dolby built a special guitar for Gale to use for rehearsal and filming.

In 2019, Intrada Records released a three -disc expansion including the first compact disc release of the original soundtrack album, as well as John Barry's complete score for the film.

=== 2019 Intrada Release ===
Original Score by John Barry - Disc 1
No.	Title	Length
1.	"Lullaby of Duckland"	2:32
2.	"Disco Duckland (Original)"	0:37
3.	"Main Title"	2:41
4.	"Howard to the Rescue"	2:28
5.	"Flashback"	0:23
6.	"Beak Jobs and Tail Tucks"	1:15
7.	"Special Destiny"	0:32
8.	"You're the Duckiest"	2:09
9.	"Taxi Ride (Alternate)"	1:00
10.	"Taxi Ride"	0:54
11.	"Man's Oldest Fantasy"	0:43
12.	"Super Powers"	0:43
13.	"Ascent of Duck"	1:20
14.	"So Long Ducky"	0:57
15.	"Lonely Duck"	1:04
16.	"Duck Bond I Presume"	1:28
17.	"Beddy-Bye for Howard"	3:21
18.	"Experiment Video"	1:09
19.	"Experiment Video (Alternate)"	1:10
20.	"Hard Boiled Egg"	1:44
21.	"My Eyes, My Eyes"	1:00
22.	"Take His Clothes Off"	0:31
23.	"So Long, Copper"	0:32
24.	"Shoot to Kill"	4:14
25.	"Shoot to Kill (Alternate)"	3:03
26.	"Dark Overlord – Introduction (Alternate)"	1:42
27.	"He's Got a Whole Gang"	1:48
28.	"Howard's Bar Brawl"	1:37
29.	"Give Me the Code Key, Howard"	1:20
30.	"It's Closing Time"	1:08
31.	"Filthy Scum Bucket"	2:16
32.	"Ultralight Discovery"	0:29
33.	"Nuclear Drive"	0:36
34.	"Ultralight #1 (Alternate)"	1:33
35.	"Ultralight #1"	1:37
36.	"Power!"	1:09
37.	"Ultralight #2"	2:22
38.	"Smog Inspection"	0:48
39.	"Ultralight #3"	3:38
40.	"Jenning as Dark Overlord"	7:18
41.	"Jenning as Dark Overlord – Part II"	0:47
42.	"Dr. Jenning"	0:17
43.	"Dark Overlord"	5:25
44.	"Fallout"	1:27
45.	"End Credits – Suite (Version #1)"	2:13

Alternate Score Cues by John Barry, Additional Music by Sylvester Levay - Disc 2
No.	Title	Writer(s)	Length
1.	"Main Title (Alternate)"	John Barry	2:42
2.	"You're the Duckiest (Alternate)"	John Barry	2:07
3.	"Man's Oldest Fantasy (Alternate)"	John Barry	0:44
4.	"My Eyes, My Eyes (Alternate)"	John Barry	1:01
5.	"Ultralight #2 (Alternate)"	John Barry	2:13
6.	"Ultralight #3 (Alternate)"	John Barry	3:34
7.	"Jenning as Dark Overlord – Part II (Alternate)"	John Barry	0:46
8.	"Dark Overlord (Alternate)"	John Barry	5:24
9.	"End Credits – Suite (Version #2)"	John Barry	3:25
10.	"Howard's Bar Brawl (Rescore)"	Sylvester Levay	1:31
11.	"Shoot to Kill (Rescore)"	Sylvester Levay	4:13
12.	"I Need Your Body (Rescore)"	Sylvester Levay	2:22
13.	"Nuclear Drive (Rescore)"	Sylvester Levay	0:38
14.	"Ultralight #1 (Rescore)"	Sylvester Levay	1:45
15.	"Power! (Rescore)"	Sylvester Levay	1:09
16.	"Ultralight #2 (Rescore)"	Sylvester Levay	2:34
17.	"Ultralight #3 (Rescore)"	Sylvester Levay	4:18
18.	"Shoot to Kill (Alternate Rescore)"	Sylvester Levay	4:12
19.	"I Need Your Body (Alternate Rescore)"	Sylvester Levay	2:22
20.	"Nuclear Drive (Alternate Rescore)"	Sylvester Levay	0:38
21.	"Ultralight #1 (Alternate Rescore)"	Sylvester Levay	1:45
22.	"Power! (Alternate Rescore)"	Sylvester Levay	1:09
23.	"Power! (Alternate End) (Rescore)"	Sylvester Levay	1:09
24.	"Ultralight #2 (Alternate Rescore)"	Sylvester Levay	2:36
25.	"Smog Inspection (Alternate Rescore)"	Sylvester Levay	0:50
26.	"Ultralight #3 (Alternate Rescore)"	Sylvester Levay	3:30

CD 3 - Original Songs and Music Produced by Thomas Dolby, plus 1986 Soundtrack Album (tracks 9–19)
No.	Title	Writer(s)	Performer	Length
1.	"Hunger City – With Extended Intro"	Allee Willis, Thomas Dolby	Dolby's Cube feat. Cherry Bomb (Lea Thompson, Holly Robinson, Dominique Davalos and Liz Sagal)	4:38
2.	"Don't Turn Away"	Allee Willis, Thomas Dolby	Thomas Dolby	5:16
3.	"I'm on My Way"	Trad., Adapted & Arranged by Thomas Dolby	Dolby's Cube feat. Táta Vega	2:55
4.	"It Don't Come Cheap"	Allee Willis, Thomas Dolby	Dolby's Cube feat. Cherry Bomb (Lea Thompson, Holly Robinson, Dominique Davalos and Liz Sagal)	4:47
5.	"Beverly's Loft (Howard The Duck – Instrumental)"	Allee Willis, Thomas Dolby, George Clinton		0:35
6.	"Don't Turn Away – Version 2"	Allee Willis, Thomas Dolby	Dolby's Cube feat. Cherry Bomb (Lea Thompson, Holly Robinson, Dominique Davalos and Liz Sagal)	6:22
7.	"Howard the Duck – Extended"	Allee Willis, Thomas Dolby, George Clinton	Dolby's Cube feat. Cherry Bomb (Lea Thompson, Holly Robinson, Dominique Davalos and Liz Sagal)	5:10
8.	"Howard the Duck (Alternate)"	Allee Willis, Thomas Dolby, George Clinton	Dolby's Cube feat. Cherry Bomb (Lea Thompson, Holly Robinson, Dominique Davalos and Liz Sagal)	4:53
9.	"Hunger City"	Allee Willis, Thomas Dolby	Dolby's Cube feat. Cherry Bomb (Lea Thompson, Holly Robinson, Dominique Davalos and Liz Sagal)	4:14
10.	"Howard the Duck"	Allee Willis, Thomas Dolby, George Clinton	Dolby's Cube feat. Cherry Bomb (Lea Thompson, Holly Robinson, Dominique Davalos and Liz Sagal)	3:57
11.	"Don't Turn Away"	Allee Willis, Thomas Dolby	Thomas Dolby	5:02
12.	"It Don't Come Cheap"	Allee Willis, Thomas Dolby	Dolby's Cube feat. Cherry Bomb (Lea Thompson, Holly Robinson, Dominique Davalos and Liz Sagal)	4:47
13.	"I'm on My Way"	Trad., Adapted & Arranged by Thomas Dolby	Dolby's Cube feat. Táta Vega	2:55
14.	"Lullaby of Duckland"	John Barry		2:27
15.	"Journey to Earth"	John Barry		2:40
16.	"You're the Duckiest"	John Barry		2:06
17.	"Ultralight Flight"	John Barry		2:58
18.	"Beddy-Bye for Howard"	John Barry		2:45
19.	"Dark Overlord"	John Barry		5:27

== Reception ==
Huyck said that test screenings "went all right" and "people laughed"; however, Katz claimed she "tore up" negative response cards so that they could say, "Hey, we got a ninety-five percent on the screening!"

=== Critical response ===
Howard the Duck received mainly negative reviews from critics. On Rotten Tomatoes, the film has an approval rating of 14%, based on 158 reviews, with an average rating of 3.8/10, making it the lowest-rated Lucasfilm production. The site's consensus states, "Tonally muddled and joyless, Howard the Duck squanders its visual effects and offbeat premise on an aimless script, juvenile humor, and a thoroughly unappealing protagonist." On Metacritic the film has a score of 28 out of 100, based on reviews from 21 critics, indicating "generally unfavorable" reviews. Audiences surveyed by CinemaScore gave the film a grade "B−" on a scale of A to F.

Gene Siskel of the Chicago Tribune gave one star out of four, called it a "stupid film" and said, "the story has no center; the duck is not likable, and the [...] special effects [...] are less impressive than a sparkler on a birthday cake." On their television show, both Siskel and his co-host Roger Ebert complained that the movie was not enough of a comedy and that Howard should have been given either the Groucho Marx–like personality from his comic books or a fun Donald Duck–like persona. Ebert also criticized the soundtrack for being downbeat and bittersweet. Orange Coast writer Marc Weinberg and Leonard Maltin criticized the decision to shoot the film in live action. Maltin described the film as "hopeless [...] a gargantuan production which produces a gargantuan headache". People magazine seemed to agree: "Lucasfilm promised us The Mallard Who Fell to Earth; the result turned out to be more like Xanaduck [...] Who'd have imagined that Howard T. Duck, the same web-footed wiseacre who conquered the incredible Space Turnip and the horrible Hellcow, might be done in by something even more ridiculous: Hollywood?"

John Nubbin reviewed Howard the Duck for Different Worlds magazine and stated that "Nor should one try and drag high consequence into a film obviously designed to be nothing more than entertaining. Howard The Duck is not Rambo in feathers. There is no ideology being pressed to the fore here. The movie was meant to make a few wry observations about human behavior and to give everyone a few laughs and a good time. It did this in spades. Anyone who missed the point, who could look past the good-natured fun being had and see plots to twist our children or turn them into zoophilous little monsters had better slow down and take a vacation. Howard the Duck was only a comedy - a fast-moving, rollicking barnstorm of a comedy; nothing more, and nothing less. See it when you can."

The appearance of Howard was criticized as being unconvincing due to his poorly functioning mouth and expressionless face. Reviewers also criticized the acting and humor and found the film boring. In The Psychotronic Video Guide, Michael Weldon described the reactions to Howard as being inconsistent, and, "It was obviously made in LA and suffered from long, boring chase scenes", but praised the stop-motion special effects in the film's final sequences. Common Sense Media criticized the film for the pointless plot lines and the excessive use of sexual innuendo. The group set the appropriate age for the movie at 13+.

=== Box office ===
The film grossed US $16.3 million in the United States and $21.7 million internationally. When the film was screened for Universal, Katz said that the studio's executives left without commenting on the film. Screenings for test audiences were met with mixed responses. Rumors circulated that Universal production heads Frank Price and Sidney Sheinberg engaged in a fistfight after arguing over who was to blame for green-lighting the film. Both executives denied the rumors. News reports speculated that one or both would be fired by MCA chairman Lew Wasserman. Price soon left the studio and was succeeded by Tom Pollock. In an article titled "Duck Cooks Price's Goose", the September 17, 1986 issue of Variety attributed his departure to the failure of the movie, although Price had not approved the film's production. The film's marketing campaign was also seen as one of the reasons for its box office failure.

In July 1986, Huyck and Katz stated that the film's ending left it open for a sequel, which they seemed interested in making. However, after the film bombed, talks of a sequel ceased. Following the box office failure, Huyck and Katz left for Hawaii and refused to read any reviews.

=== Accolades ===
The six actors who gave physical performances as Howard received a Golden Raspberry Award for "Worst New Star". The appearance of Howard was generally seen as being unconvincing.

Award	Category	Nominee(s)	Result	Ref.
Golden Raspberry Awards (1986)	Worst Picture	Gloria Katz	Won (Note: Tied with Under the Cherry Moon.)	
Golden Raspberry Awards (1986)	Worst Director	Willard Huyck	Nominated	
Golden Raspberry Awards (1986)	Worst Supporting Actor	Tim Robbins	Nominated	
Golden Raspberry Awards (1986)	Worst Screenplay	Willard Huyck and Gloria Katz; Based on the Marvel Comics character created by Steve Gerber	Won	
Golden Raspberry Awards (1986)	Worst New Star	The six guys and gals in the duck suit	Won	
Golden Raspberry Awards (1986)	Worst Original Song	"Howard the Duck"; Music and Lyrics by Thomas Dolby, Allee Willis and George Clinton	Nominated	
Golden Raspberry Awards (1986)	Worst Visual Effects	Industrial Light and Magic	Won	
Golden Raspberry Awards (1989)	Worst Picture of the Decade		Nominated	
Stinkers Bad Movie Awards	Worst Picture	Gloria Katz	Won	

== Home media ==
Howard the Duck was first released on VHS and LaserDisc in January 1987. It was released on a Special Edition DVD by Universal Studios on March 10, 2009. The film was released on Blu-ray on March 8, 2016. It was later released on 4K Blu-ray to commemorate the film's 35th Anniversary in 2021.

== Novelization ==
A novelization of Howard the Duck was written by former National Lampoon editor Ellis Weiner.

== Legacy ==
The reaction to the film had a negative effect on the cast, who found themselves unable to work on other projects because of the film. The bad press right at the opening weekend had Lea Thompson accepting a role in Some Kind of Wonderful, which she had refused previously, because, as she said, "I had to get on another movie, I wouldn't have done the movie if Howard wasn't such a bomb."

According to Ed Gale, he was hired to work on Spaceballs because Mel Brooks had said, "Anybody who's in Howard the Duck can be in my movie." Gale also said he receives more fan mail for his Howard the Duck portrayal than for his Chucky performances, the antagonist in the Child's Play horror film series. After the film's release, Huyck and Katz chose to work on more dramatic projects to separate themselves from Howard the Duck. Katz said Lucas continued to support the film after its failure because he felt it would later be seen in a better light than it had been at the time of its release. Huyck said he later encountered fans and supporters of the film who felt that it had been unfairly treated by critics. Lea Thompson has stated that she had fun making the film and is happy to find fans "celebrating Howard the Duck in all its great silliness and blemishes." Jeffrey Jones also said he is happy with his role in the film. In retrospect, Huyck and Katz suggested that the film "could have had a more Ted-like tone" and "been edgier and dirtier," but that at the time "Universal wanted a family-friendly movie."

In 1997, Steve Gerber expressed his overall dissatisfaction with the film:

What can I say? It sucks. In retrospect, though, after eleven years that have brought us so many worse films, it's not quite as sucky as the reviews might have led you to believe. Still, there are big problems with it, chief among them the duck costume and the duck's bland voice. I liked the performances by Jeffrey Jones, Tim Robbins, and Lea Thompson, though. Lea wasn't playing "my" Beverly, but she did reasonably well with the role as it was written.

In June 2012, the YouTube series Marvel Superheroes: What the--?! featured an episode starring Howard the Duck complaining to Marvel that his movie was not given a special Blu-ray re-release to celebrate its 25th anniversary. He eventually gets Joe Quesada to try to appeal to and bribe George Lucas into supporting the re-release. In 2014, the Los Angeles Times listed the film as one of the costliest box-office flops of all time. Filmmaker James Gunn, a fan of the character, stated he was disappointed of the film.

Writer Chip Zdarsky, who took on Howard's comics in the 2010s, revealed he was a fan of the movie growing up and had the 2016 run of the title featuring metafictional references to the film. The plot had Lea Thompson hiring Howard and discovering the villain Mojo had hypnotized her into playing Beverly opposite an alien in a Howard costume.

In a June 2018 interview, Lea Thompson said that she was going to pitch Marvel Studios a new Howard the Duck movie following the character's cameo appearances in Guardians of the Galaxy and its 2017 sequel voiced by Seth Green, expressing hope at directing it herself. In 2021, following the release of a trailer for the Disney+ animated series What If...?, which prominently featured Howard, Thompson once again indicated her interest in directing the film. She later revealed that she had pitched the film, following Howard stranded on Earth after the events of Avengers: Endgame, with Joe Quinones supplying artwork. While she received a positive response, Marvel Studios ultimately passed on it. However, she revealed that they indeed have plans for the character.

== Video game ==
A video game sequel was released for the ZX Spectrum, Commodore 64, and Apple II in 1986 and for the ZX Spectrum and Amstrad CPC in 1987, developed by Arnative Software and published by Activision. The game received generally negative reviews.

== See also ==
- List of 20th century films considered the worst

== Notes ==
Awards
Preceded by Rambo: First Blood Part II	Razzie Award for Worst Picture (tied with Under the Cherry Moon); 7th Golden Raspberry Awards	Succeeded by Leonard Part 6
Preceded by Revolution	Stinker Award for Worst Picture; 1986 Stinkers Bad Movie Awards	Succeeded by Spaceballs
