= Nevada (comics) =

DC comic book series from 1998

- Cover of the first issue

Publication information
- Publisher: DC Comics
- Format: Limited series
- Genre: Urban fantasy
- Publication date: May–October 1998

Creative team
- Written by: Steve Gerber
- Artist(s): Phil Winslade; Steve Leialoha; Dick Giordano

Collected editions
- Nevada: ISBN 1-56389-518-8

Nevada is the title of an American comic book limited series published by DC Comics under its Vertigo imprint in 1998. The series was written by Steve Gerber and with art by Phil Winslade, Steve Leialoha, and Dick Giordano.

The origin of the character is to be found in a Howard the Duck story that contained a "mandatory fight scene" between a Las Vegas chorus girl, an ostrich and a standing lamp. Writing on the CompuServe comics forum, Neil Gaiman said he would like to see that story. When Gerber was asked to come up with something original by Vertigo editor Karen Berger (who rejected his Vertigo take on Inferior Five), he created Nevada.

== Plot ==
Nevada is a Las Vegas chorus girl with a pet performing ostrich named "Bolero". One day, reality begins to change; while investigating, she finds herself fighting against a mobster with a lava lamp for a head.

The character also appeared in Vertigo: Winter's Edge #1 (January 1998) and #2 (January 1999), and was parodied by Gerber as "Utah" in Howard the Duck vol. 2, #4 (June 2002). Leonard the Duck appeared in the story in #2. As Nevada is a creator-owned character, she has made no more subsequent appearances.

== Collected editions ==
The series has been collected into a trade paperback:

- Nevada (156 pages, 1999 ISBN 1-56389-518-8)

== Awards ==
Nevada was nominated for the Comics Buyer's Guide Fan Award for Favorite Limited Series for 1999.
