= Doctor Bong =

Fictional Marvel Comics villain

Publication information
- Publisher: Marvel Comics
- First appearance: Howard the Duck #15 (August 1977)
- Created by: Steve Gerber; Marie Severin

In-story information
- Alter ego: Lester Verde
- Partnerships: Fifi the Duck
- Abilities: Genius scientist Advanced knowledge of genetic engineering Wears a bell-shaped helmet that can be struck to create a number of effects

Doctor Bong (Lester Verde) is a supervillain appearing in American comic books published by Marvel Comics. The character possesses an advanced knowledge of genetic engineering, and his bell-shaped helmet can be struck to create a number of effects. Intended as a parody of Doctor Moreau, he is an archenemy of Howard the Duck.

== Publication history ==
Doctor Bong first appeared in Howard the Duck #15 (August 1977), and was created by Steve Gerber and Marie Severin. The character's personality was loosely based on journalist Bob Greene.

The character subsequently appears in Howard the Duck #16–20 (Sept. 1977–Jan. 1978), #24–25 (May–June 1978), #27 (Sept. 1978), #30–31 (March, May 1979), The Sensational She-Hulk #5 (Sept. 1989), Deadpool #26–27 (March–April 1999), Howard the Duck #1–3 (March–May 2002), Daughters of the Dragon #3 (May 2006), and The Amazing Spider-Man #552 (April 2008).

Doctor Bong received an entry in the Official Handbook of the Marvel Universe Update '89 #2.

== Fictional character biography ==
As a child, Lester Verde was severely bullied. When complaining about it to his mother, she noted his creative use of insults against his tormentors and sparked his desire to use his creativity to become a writer.

Originally a journalism student whose yellow journalism got his professor fired, his hand is severed by a miniature guillotine when performing with the punk band Mildred Horowitz. This is a large factor in his becoming the villain Doctor Bong. How he developed his paraphernalia was never explained.

It is revealed that he was also a skilled scientist, using his knowledge of chemistry and physics to create several devices and creatures to do his bidding, particularly Fifi the Duck, who was the closest thing Bong had to a henchwoman. He lives in a castle on a remote island, and can stun or kill by ringing his bell-shaped head.

He had a longtime crush on Beverly Switzler, whom he eventually married. Before he was removed from the book, Steve Gerber had intended their marriage to last and for her to no longer be a main character in the Howard the Duck series. After Gerber left, Bill Mantlo brought Beverly, now single again, back to the book.

John Byrne later pitted Bong against She-Hulk, trying to uncensor sanitized violent television so that his genetically-engineered quintuplets would be raised not finding violence at all attractive. She-Hulk, using her abilities to break the fourth wall, manages to defeat him.

It is later revealed in his initial appearance that he had given up supervillainy to obtain a PhD in psychology. His first patient is Deadpool, who came to him for treatment after the events of Dead Reckoning. He was, however, back to supervillainy by the Max Howard the Duck series.

Doctor Bong creates imperfect clones of Captain America, Moon Knight, and Black Widow and lures Deadpool into teaming up with them. While at their main base, the real Secret Avengers infiltrate the base, causing the real Steve Rogers to battle with Deadpool. After pummeling each other, the real Moon Knight steps in and things finally calm down enough that Captain America and Deadpool can talk, Bong realizes that he has officially lost. He sets off an explosion that kills the Moon Knight and Black Widow clones, apparently collapsing the building on all the occupants. Bong attempts to set off an explosion, but Deadpool slices off his arm, leaving him helpless.

== Powers and abilities ==
Doctor Bong is a genius scientist with advanced knowledge of genetic engineering. His main weapon is his bell-shaped helmet which creates a number of effects when struck, including generating concussive blasts and teleporting him.
