= Omega the Unknown =

- Cover art to Omega the Unknown #1, the first appearance of Omega. Cover art by Ed Hannigan and Joe Sinnott.

Publication information
- Publisher: Marvel Comics
- First appearance: Omega the Unknown #1 (March 1976)
- Created by: Steve Gerber; Mary Skrenes; Jim Mooney

In-story information
- Partnerships: James-Michael Starling
- Notable aliases: "Sam"
- Abilities: Superhuman strength Flight; Energy burst projection

Omega the Unknown is an American comic book published by Marvel Comics from 1976 to 1977, featuring the eponymous fictional character. The series, written by Steve Gerber and Mary Skrenes and illustrated by Jim Mooney, ran for 10 issues before cancellation for low sales. Despite its short run, it has endured as a cult classic due to its intriguing characters and unusual storytelling. A 10-issue series revamping the character was published from 2007 to 2008, written by novelist Jonathan Lethem and illustrated by Farel Dalrymple.

== Creation and concept ==
Unlike many other superhero titles, the main focus of Omega the Unknown is not on the superpowered person in an iconic costume and cape. Instead the story largely deals with an unusually mature 12-year-old boy named James-Michael Starling. Through the 10-issue run of the original comic book series it is made clear that there is a connection between Omega and James-Michael, with most issues adding to the mysterious nature of their relationship. Interviewed in 2005 after the sequel was announced, co-creator Steve Gerber stated that he "wanted to do a series about a real kid who was nobody's sidekick, facing real problems in what today would be called a 'grim 'n gritty' setting." The series was cancelled in 1977, but Steve Gerber promised to wrap up its unfinished plotlines in The Defenders. Gerber was fired by Marvel Comics in 1978 and never completed the storyline.

In late 1978, Al Milgrom, the editor of The Defenders, assigned writer Steven Grant to complete the story, the conclusion of which was still being sought after in fan correspondence. Grant did this in two issues of The Defenders in 1979, at the end of which most of the original series' characters were killed. While Gerber seemed unhappy with Grant's conclusion, it nevertheless tied up the loose ends of the comic series, and is considered "canon" by Marvel. Grant later wrote that the character held no interest for him, but he had tried to approach writing the story in the way that he felt that Gerber would have, had he been allowed to complete it himself.

== Plot synopsis ==
In the premiere issue, the character of Omega is shown as the last surviving member of an unnamed alien race. He escapes the mechanical beings who have devastated his planet in a ship headed to Earth. The story then cuts to James-Michael waking up in bed having dreamed the events that just occurred with Omega.

In his waking world, James-Michael and his parents are moving to New York City from the mountains so he can improve his socialization skills after years of home-schooling. En route to New York, the Starlings' car is driven off the road and both of James-Michael's parents are killed, but not before the boy discovers that both of them are robots. James-Michael collapses into a coma and awakens a month later in a private hospital, exhibiting an eerie lack of emotional response to his parents' deaths. The hospital is later attacked by one of the mechanical beings that destroyed Omega's home world, and Omega appears to defend James-Michael. The superhero and the android fight but the conflict ends when James-Michael destroys the alien mechanism with energy bursts from his hands, a power also used by Omega.

After this beginning, the story follows James-Michael's life as he is fostered to two young women in the Hell's Kitchen neighborhood of New York City. The series explores the problems he encounters in a strange new place, and his trials and friendships in a New York City public school. Issues of racism and bullying are addressed, although the stories' focus is on how the reserved and detached James-Michael relates to the world around him.

Meanwhile, Omega the Unknown becomes a superhero figure in New York City, tending to fight only second-string supervillains with a variety of outcomes. Otherwise, Omega tends to appear when James-Michael is in danger and then takes a more proactive role. As the series progresses Omega and James-Michael eventually meet and interact, although the nature of their relationship remains unclear. Omega is killed in the final issue, leaving the mysteries of the story unresolved.

== Fictional character biography ==
Omega the Unknown is a humanoid being of superhuman power bio-engineered by an extraterrestrial mechanoid race named the Protar, from the planet Protaris in the Regreb (an anagram of "Gerber") System in the Milky Way Galaxy. The Protar, foreseeing their own extinction, decided to create an ideal race of true humanoids as their legacy to the cosmos. Their penultimate model, later called Omega, was placed on the planet Srenesk (an anagram of series co-writer [Mary] "Skrenes") to learn. He commandeered a Protar starship and fled to Earth after inadvertently destroying the world on which he was placed. The Earth was the home of the final "model" in his series, the artificially created boy James-Michael Starling, whom Omega sought to protect from the Protar.

While on Earth, Omega was employed for odd jobs by a New York City pawn-broker, and had a number of battles with local beings. He battled the Hulk, Electro, Blockbuster, and Nitro. While later embroiled in a rematch with Blockbuster, the second Foolkiller saved Omega's life by murdering Blockbuster.

Omega was finally shot dead in Las Vegas by the Las Vegas Police while battling Ruby Thursday; the police thought Omega was assaulting Ruby. James-Michael Starling, who had inherited Omega's power, learned the true origin of himself and Omega but refused to accept the truth. He threatened to use the power of Earth's biosphere against the Defenders. Seeing the error of his decision, he ended his own life when he turned the power inward and self-destructed.

In the series The Darkhold Omega, it is revealed that James-Michael Starling was lost in the dimension called Other-Realm, and that the original Omega had died. In Other-Realm, James battled the demonic entity Chthon, before being returned to earth by the Scarlet Witch. Afterward he is seen to have taken on the costume and title of Omega, and was living in rural Pennsylvania where his "mother", a floating robotic head, vowed to take care of him.

== Powers and abilities ==
Omega was created through Protarian technology, and has superhuman strength. He has limited psychokinetic abilities, and has a psionic rapport with other Protarian organic creations.

Omega was educated as a warrior on the planet Srenesk, trained in the fighting skills of a Srenesk warrior. The extraterrestrial Sreneskian endowed him with the ability to draw upon the psionic energy of the biosphere to project energy bolts from his hands and fly. Using biospheric energy beyond a certain level could result in global destruction.

== Reception ==
In 2010, Comics Bulletin ranked Gerber and Mooney's run on Omega the Unknown tenth on its list of the "Top 10 1970s Marvels".

Comic Book Resources placed Omega the Unknown as one of "15 Superheroes Marvel Wants You To Forget", stating "his complicated history makes it exceedingly unlikely that he'll return to the Marvel universe."

== 2007 series ==
Cover of the first issue of the revamped Omega the Unknown, illustrated by Farel Dalrymple.

Novelist Jonathan Lethem and artist Farel Dalrymple revived Omega the Unknown in a 10-issue limited series published in 2007. Lethem was a childhood fan of the first Omega series, and referenced the character in his 2003 novel The Fortress of Solitude. When asked about Omega's appeal, Lethem stated,

When Marvel invited me into their vault of iconography, I simply leapt at the icon that resonated most deeply with me. It didn't hurt that Omega had been laying in neglect for so long, I might have had trouble trying to utilize a character who'd been put through so many paces as Spider-Man or the Hulk, say. Omega seemed a resource of thwarted possibility, open to speculation, not plumbed-out.

After hearing of Lethem's plans to revive Omega, the character's co-creator Steve Gerber expressed personal outrage over the use of the character without his participation, though he and Mary Skrenes later discussed the project with Lethem and Gerber admitted that he had "misjudged" him. The first issue of the revamped Omega the Unknown was published in October 2007, and Marvel released another issue each month until the 10th was published in July 2008. All 10 issues have been collected and reprinted in a single volume.

The series was nominated in the "Best Limited Series" and "Best Lettering" categories in the 2009 Eisner Awards. An excerpt was selected by Neil Gaiman to be anthologized in The Best American Comics 2010.

== Collected editions ==
- Omega: The Unknown Classic (collects Omega: The Unknown #1–10 and Defenders #76–77, 224 pages, January 2006, ISBN 0-7851-2009-2)
- Omega: The Unknown (collects Omega: The Unknown (vol. 2) #1–10, 240 pages, premiere hardcover, October 2008, ISBN 0-7851-3052-7)
