= Frank Brunner =

American comics artist and illustrator (born 1949)

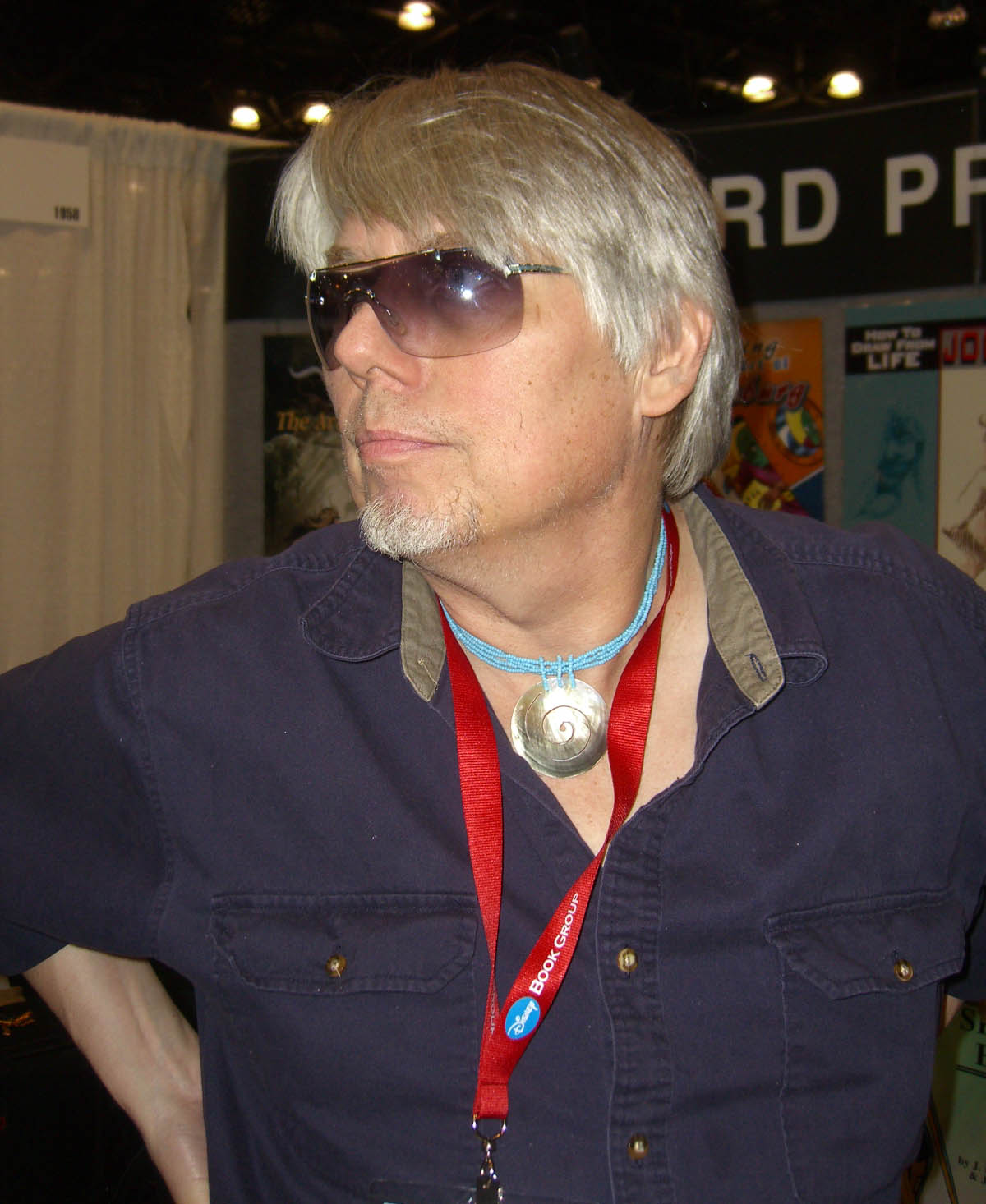
- Brunner in 2008
- Born: February 21, 1949 (age 77)
- Area: Artist
- Notable works: Creepy; Doctor Strange; Eerie; Howard the Duck; Vampirella
- Awards: Inkpot Award 1976

Frank Brunner (born February 21, 1949) is an American comics artist and illustrator best known for his work at Marvel Comics in the 1970s.

== Early life ==
Brunner attended Manhattan's High School of Art and Design. He was in the same graduating class as Larry Hama and Ralph Reese. He studied at the New York University Film School.

== Career ==
=== Comics ===
Brunner entered the comics profession as a horror writer-artist for the black-and-white comics magazines Web of Horror, Creepy, Eerie, and Vampirella. His first work for Marvel Comics was inking an 11-page Watcher backup story in The Silver Surfer #6 (June 1969). Brunner's best-known color-comics work is his Marvel Comics collaboration with writer Steve Engelhart on the supernatural hero Doctor Strange in Marvel Premiere #9–14 (July 1973 – March 1974) and in Doctor Strange: Master of the Mystic Arts #1–2 and #4–5 (June–August 1974 and Oct.–Dec. 1974). The two killed Dr. Strange's mentor, the Ancient One, and Strange became the new Sorcerer Supreme. Englehart and Brunner created a multi-issue storyline in which a sorcerer named Sise-Neg ("Genesis" spelled backward) goes back through history, collecting all magical energies, until he reaches the beginning of the universe, becomes all-powerful and creates it anew, leaving Strange to wonder whether this was, paradoxically, the original creation. Stan Lee, seeing the issue after publication, ordered Englehart and Brunner to print a retraction saying this was not God but a god, so as to avoid offending religious readers. The writer and artist concocted a fake letter from a fictitious minister praising the story, and mailed it to Marvel from Texas; Marvel unwittingly printed the letter, and dropped the retraction order. In 2010, Comics Bulletin ranked Englehart and Brunner's run on the "Doctor Strange" feature ninth on its list of the "Top 10 1970s Marvels".

Other Marvel credits include Howard the Duck's first two solo stories in Giant-Size Man-Thing #4 and #5 (May and Aug. 1975) and the first two issues of the Howard the Duck comic book series (Jan. and March 1976), as well as the anthologies Chamber of Chills, Haunt of Horror, and Unknown Worlds of Science Fiction. He drew covers for the supernatural series The Tomb of Dracula and the swamp-monster series Man-Thing.

Also for Marvel, Brunner adapted Robert E. Howard's sword-and-sorcery pulp fiction hero Conan the Barbarian in the 42-page story "The Scarlet Citadel", and drew many covers for the similar series Red Sonja and Savage Sword of Conan. Brunner left Marvel in 1979 and wrote an essay in The Comics Journal stating that he "felt the romance with comics was over".

Brunner and novelist Michael Moorcock collaborated on a comics adaptation of Moorcock's sword-and-sorcery hero Elric in Heavy Metal magazine. It was reprinted in publisher Mike Friedrich's Star Reach Greatest Hits.

Brunner briefly returned to comics in the early-1980s as artist on the First Comics title Warp!, based on the science fiction play that ran briefly on Broadway in the 1970s. He then wrote and drew the graphic novel The Seven Samuroid (1984), a science-fiction takeoff of the movie classic Seven Samurai.

=== Film and television ===
Brunner moved to Hollywood and began a career in movie and television animation, working on projects for Hanna-Barbera (Jonny Quest), Walt Disney Imagineering (Euro Tomorrowland movie), Warner Bros. (preproduction Batman design) and DreamWorks (Invasion USA). He was the head of character design for the Fox animated series X-Men.

== Awards ==
Brunner received an Inkpot Award in 1976.

== Bibliography ==
=== Books ===
- The Brunner Mystique (Artist Index Series Volume One) (Hendrik Sharples and Steven R. Johnson, March 1976)
- Brunner's Beauties (Eros Comix, August 1993)
- Eyes Of Light: the Fantasy Art of Frank Brunner (Vanguard Productions, 2002)
- Mythos: The Fantasy Realms of Frank Brunner (Vanguard Productions, 2007)

=== Comics and magazines ===
Interior art (except where noted) includes:

==== First Comics ====
- Warp! #1–9 (1983)

==== Marvel Comics ====
- Chamber of Chills #2–4 (1973)
- Doctor Strange #1–5 (also covers) (1974)
- Giant-Size Man-Thing # 4–5 (1975) (first two Howard the Duck solo appearances)
- Howard the Duck #1–2 (also covers) (1976)
- Marvel Premiere (Doctor Strange feature) #4 (inker); #6, 9–14 (1972–1974)
- Monsters Unleashed #2 (1973)
- Mystic Hands of Dr. Strange #1 (2010)
- Savage Sword of Conan #30 (1978)
- Silver Surfer #6 (inker) (1969)
- Unknown Worlds of Science Fiction #1 (1975)

==== Pacific Comics ====
- Alien Worlds #6 (cover and interior art) (1984)

==== Star Reach ====
- Quack #1, 6 (1976–1977)
- Star Reach #3 (also painted cover); #10, 12 (covers only) (1974–1977)

==== Warren Publishing ====
- Creepy #39, 45 (1971–1972)
- Eerie #35 (1971)
- Vampirella #10 (1971)

==== Other publishers ====
- Adventures of Chrissie Claus #31 (cover)
- Brunner's Carnal Delights #1 (cover) (Carnal)
- Castle of Frankenstein (Kable News)
- Crawdaddy!
- Flare #29 (cover) (Hero)
- Flare Adventures #13, 15–19 (covers) (Hero)
- Monster Times
- Red Sonja #2 (cover) (Dynamite Entertainment)
- Unknown Worlds of Frank Brunner (cover) (Eclipse Comics)
- Silver Comics #1, 4, 6 (covers) (Silver)
- Karmatron #20 (cover and interior art, 1987) (Cepsa)
- The War of the Worlds (covers) (Best Sellers Illustrated)
- Witchgirls Inc. #1–3, 5 (covers)
- Wild Stars #1–6 (covers) (Little Rocket)

=== Art portfolios ===
- Flesh & Fantasy Bran Mak Morn
- Elric
- Alice in Wonderland
- Through the Looking-Glass (Alice II)
- Stormbringer (Elric II)
- Flesh & Fantasy II
- Legends of Arzack

=== Trading cards (Topps) ===
- Jurassic Park
- Star Wars Galaxy
- Vampirella
- Mars Attacks
- Satan's Six

=== Film ===
==== Live-action ====
- Cellar Dweller
- From Time To Time (Disney)
- Dr. Strange (CBS)
- Dinosaur Valley Girls

==== Animation ====
- The Real Adventures of Jonny Quest
- Sky Commanders
- Dark Water
- Dino-Riders
- Once Upon a Forest (feature)
- X-Men: The Animated Series (1992–1995)
- Darkstalkers
- Skeleton Warriors
- Extreme Ghostbusters

=== Record-album covers ===
- Faithful Breath
- Mandator
- Necronomicon (German heavy metal bands)
- Veto (Danish heavy metal band)

=== Poster prints ===
- The Faerie Princess (Dreamweaver Studios)
- Four Queens Of The Tarot (Color)
- Dreamtide (Dreamweaver)
- Go Ask Alice (Dreamweaver)
- Raiders Of The Lost Egg (Vanguard)

Preceded by Jim Starlin	"Doctor Strange" feature in Marvel Premiere artist 1973–1974	Succeeded by n/a
Preceded by n/a	Doctor Strange vol. 2 artist 1974	Succeeded by Gene Colan
Preceded by n/a	Howard the Duck artist 1976	Succeeded by John Buscema
