= List of Ultraverse characters =

This is a list of fictional characters in the Ultraverse.

The line was published first by Malibu Comics and after a purchase, by Marvel Comics.

== A ==
- Aeon
- The Alternate
- Anything
- Nick Apocaloff a.k.a. The Werewolf
- Archimage
- Arena
- Argus
- Atalon
- Atom Bob

== B ==
- Backstabber
- Battlewagon
- Black Tiger
- Blind Faith
- Blood Mama
- Bloodbath
- Bloodgrip
- Bloodrattle
- Bloodshed
- Bloodstorm
- Bloodtrap
- Bloodyfly
- Boneyard
- Book
- Boomboy
- Brazen
- Breakdown
- Bruut
- Byter

== C ==
- Captain USA
- Casino
- Catapult
- Cayman
- Chalk
- Choice
- Codename: Firearm
- Contrary
- Culebra

== D ==
- Dark Wave
- Deadeye
- Death Dance
- Death Mask
- Deathwish
- Degenerate
- Dr. Rachel Deming
- Dirt Devil
- Discus
- D.J. Blast
- Doc Gross
- Doc Virtual
- Dog
- Double Edge
- Dragonfly
- Dropkick
- Duet
- Duey

== E ==
- ElectroCute
- Eliminator
- Elven
- The Entity

== The Exiles ==
The first Exiles comic was written by Steve Gerber and illustrated by Paul Pelletier, with plot contributions from Tom Mason, Dave Olbrich, and Chris Ulm (who came up with the concept and handed it to Gerber to expand upon when they got too busy to execute it).

The four issues of Exiles covered a time period of only 18 hours. This group was founded and led by Dr. Rachel Deming, and introduced Ghoul (one of Ultraforce's main members) and Amber Hunt to the Ultraverse. Much of the plot revolved around a fatal "Theta Virus", the treatment of which gave the characters their superhuman powers. Dr. Deming assumed that people with powers are automatically superheroes, and their lack of training, cohesion, and leadership led to disaster. Aside from Deming (who suffered many fractures), Ghoul (who was already more or less a zombie, and thus later rose from his grave), Deadeye (who survived the tidal wave and later left the team) and Hunt, the other members of the team were Catapult, Mustang, Tinsel, and Trax. Mastodon was introduced in the series, but never joined the team, and eventually appeared in the pages of Foxfire.

Their members were:

- Catapult (Kevin Albers) had the ability to absorb inertia and turn it into super strength. He is killed by aliens while in a coma.
- Deadeye (Frank Hayes): Frank has incredible accuracy with ranged weapons. His current whereabouts are unknown.
- Dr. Rachel Deming cured the others of the Theta Virus and put them together as a team when the cure gave them superpowers. Her current whereabouts are unknown.
- Ghoul (Jonathan Martin) has appearance of a corpse, can reform body after it was damaged, talk to the dead, and sense when a person was near death. He joined to Ultraforce.
- Amber Hunt can manipulate heat and flames, as well as fly. She joined to Ultraforce.
- Mustang (Roderick Hartley) can generate electricity, killed in explosion.
- Tinsel (Melissa Scott): Blinded by cure so she had to wear a special visor to see, and could generate light for various effects, she was shot to death by Bloodbath.
- Trax (Judd Shepard) has ability to sense danger and track others by their bio-signature. He was killed in explosion.

== F ==
- Feline
- Firearm
- Flygirl
- Forsa
- Foxfire

== G ==
- G.E.N.I.E. (see Aladdin)
- Gangsta
- Gate
- Gecko
- Gemini
- Generator X
- The Genius
- Ghoul
- Glare
- Guise
- Grenade
- The Grip
- Gun Nut
- Gunk

== H ==
- Hardcase
- Hardwire
- Harmonica
- Headknocker
- Heater
- Hellblade
- Hellion
- Hot Rox
- Amber Hunt
- J.D. Hunt

== I ==
- Incoming
- Iron Clad

== J ==
- Janus
- Jinn
- Erik Johnson (see Aladdin)
- Juggernaut

== K ==
- King Pleasure
- Kismet Deadly
- Malcolm Kort
- Kutt

== L ==
- Lady Killer
- Lament
- Stanley Leland
- Lightshow
- Antone Lone
- Lost Angel
- Lord Pumpkin - a sorcerer and enemy of Ultraforce created by writer Dan Danko

== M ==
- Mangle
- Manhattan Project
- Maniac
- Mannequin
- Mantra
- Master of the Hunt
- Mastodon
- Maxi-Man
- Maxis
- Meathook
- Mister Mischief
- Monkey Woman
- Moon-Man
- Mosh
- Edwin Mosley
- Rex Mundi
- Mustang

== N ==
- Naiad
- Necromantra
- Needler
- Nemesis (see Infinity Gems)
- Neuronne
- The Night Man
- NM-E
- Notch

== O ==
- The Old Man
- The Operator
- Outrage

== P ==
- Papa Verité
- Phade
- The Pilgrim
- Pinnacle
- Pistol
- Pixx
- Planet Class
- Plug
- Powerhouse
- Pressure
- Prime
- Primevil
- Prototype

== Q ==
- Quixote

== R ==
- Rafferty
- Ranger
- General Holden S. Rayder (see Aladdin)
- Rhiannon
- Rigoletto
- Ripfire
- Rivermen
- Noel Robinson
- Rodent
- Rune
- Rush

== S ==
- Shadowmage
- Shuriken
- Siren
- Slayer
- Sludge
- Solitaire
- Spectral
- Starburst
- Strike
- Supreme Soviet
- Sweetface

== T ==
- Taboo
- Tech
- Teknight
- Tinsel
- Topaz
- Torso
- Trax
- Trouble
- Tugun
- Turbo
- Turf
- Tyrannosaur

== V ==
- Veffir Voon Lyax
- Veil
- Vinaigrette

== W ==
- War Eagle
- Warstrike
- Wicca
- Witch Hunter
- Wrath
- Wreckage

== X ==
- Xanadu Amalgamated

== Y ==
- Yrial

== Z ==
- Zip-Zap

== Teams ==
- Aladdin Assault Squad
- Bash Brothers
- Blood Brothers
- The Cabal
- The Dragon Fang
- Eliminators
- Exiles
- The All-New Exiles
- Freex
- The Inquisitors
- Omega Team
- Quattro
- The Radicals
- The Raiders
- The Solution
- The Sportsmen
- The Squad
- The Strangers
- TNTNT
- Techuza
- Terrordyne
- Ultraforce
- Ultra-Violence

== Government agencies ==
- Aladdin
- The Lodge

== Races ==
- Aerwa
- Darkur
- Fire People
- Hesshites
- The Primals
- The Tradesmen
- The Vyr
- Ultras
