= List of Night Man episodes =

Night Man is an American-Canadian live-action superhero television series, developed by Glen A. Larson, starring Matt McColm as Johnny Domino, that aired in syndication from September 15, 1997 to May 17, 1999. The series is loosely based on the character from The Night Man comic book published, through the Ultraverse imprint, by Malibu Comics, which was later purchased by Marvel Comics, and was created by Steve Englehart, who also wrote three episodes of the series.

== Series overview ==
Season	Episodes	Originally released	
Season	Episodes	First released	Last released
1	22	September 19, 1997	May 17, 1998
2	22	October 11, 1998	May 23, 1999

== Episodes ==
=== Season 1 (1997–98) ===
No. overall	No. in season	Title	Directed by	Written by	Original release date	Prod. code
1	1	"Pilot"	Nick Daniel	Glen A. Larson	September 19, 1997	101a-101b
2	2	"Pilot"	Nick Daniel	Glen A. Larson	September 19, 1997	101a-101b
Musician Johnny Domino (Matt McColm), develops superpowers after being struck by lightning, and must battle gun thieves. Johnny becomes Night Man by using his newfound powers and the advanced weapons wanted by the foreign thieves against them. Guest stars: David Hasselhoff, James Karen, Brian George, Daniel Dae Kim, Nicole Nagel.
3	3	"Whole Lotta Shakin'..."	Rex Piano	Story by : Bruce Kalish; Teleplay by : Bruce Kalish & Stephen A. Miller	October 6, 1997	102
Bay City is evacuated after a massive earthquake is predicted, leaving the town vulnerable to the robbery plans of international terrorists. Guest star: Little Richard
4	4	"I Left My Heart"	Nick Daniel	Stephen A. Miller	October 13, 1997	103
A dying drug lord (Henry Darrow) takes party-goers hostage when he finds that the entertainer - Johnny - has the one thing he needs to keep living: a healthy heart. Casey Biggs also guest stars.
5	5	"Still of the Night"	Clay Borris	D.G. Larson	October 20, 1997	104
Night Man is infected with a mysterious and deadly virus after he has a run-in with a beast from another dimension. Now he must find the cure and send the beast back to where it came. Guest stars: J. Kenneth Campbell, Sarah Lancaster, Carlos Bernard.
6	6	"Face to Face"	Robert Munic	Stephen A. Miller	October 27, 1997	105
A plastic surgeon helps a vengeful ex-con save face by helping him alter his features at will, causing trouble for his past captors, including Charlie and Frank. Guest stars: Cyril O'Reilly, Brian McNamara, Lucinda Weist, Jim Hanks, Frederick Coffin, Donald Trump.
7	7	"Chrome"	Robert Munic	Glen A. Larson	November 3, 1997	106
Bay City is targeted by a supervillain known as Chrome, who received his predatory powers from the same lightning bolt that changed Johnny into NightMan.
8	8	"Takin' It to the Streets"	Rex Piano	Stephen A. Miller	November 10, 1997	107
Johnny jumps through hoops to save a basketball hopeful from falling in with a crime boss (Evan Lionel), but Night Man may have a better shot at saving the kid's career.
9	9	"Lady In Red"	Mark Andrew	Story by : Karl Bakke & Glen A. Larson; Teleplay by : Karl Bakke	November 17, 1997	108
Johnny gets some bad vibrations from a woman (Natasha Pavlovich), only to learn of her past as a KGB assassin, and of her future as a pawn for the Russian mafia.
10	10	"That Ol' Gang of Mine"	Robert Munic	Doug Heyes, Jr.	November 24, 1997	109
A descendant of J. Edgar Hoover frees Al Capone, John Dillinger, and Bonnie Parker from suspended animation.
11	11	"Bad Moon Rising"	David Francis	Christopher Scott	January 11, 1998	110
Johnny, Frank and Charlie hunt down the syndicate responsible for smuggling a shipment of tainted heroin into Bay City.
12	12	"Constant Craving"	Bud Bashore	Janet Curtis & Stephen A. Miller & Glen A. Larson	January 18, 1998	111
Night Man makes the ultimate sacrifice to save his father from two vampires who are fighting for control of the man's soul.
13	13	"You Are Too Beautiful"	Robert Munic	Steve Englehart	January 25, 1998	112
Night Man steps into the ring as a mysterious, masked gladiator, to clear a wrestler (Brian McGovern) who's being framed by his murderous manager.
14	14	"Do You Believe in Magic?"	Mark Jones	Steven Kriozere	February 1, 1998	113
Night Man's powers are tested when he battles a sorceress (Jacinda Barrett), who uses her wicked ways to uncover the secrets of Johnny and his loved ones.
15	15	"The House of Soul"	Mark Jones	Reuben Leder	February 8, 1998	114
Jerry Springer guest stars as the House of Soul is discovered to be built over a section of an Asian community from the 1908 San Francisco earthquake, and is still inhabited by a ghost.
16	16	"Nightwoman"	Robert Spera	Story by : Mark Jones & Glen A. Larson; Teleplay by : Glen A. Larson	February 15, 1998	115
A cop (Jennifer Campbell) is turned into Night Man's female counterpart by her scientist father after she is left for dead following an attack by the mob. Her new powers may lead her into an even deadlier situation.
17	17	"Chrome II"	David Francis	Stephen A. Miller & Glen A. Larson	February 22, 1998	116
Night Man must once again battle the revitalized Joran/Chrome, who has joined a telepathic woman to put in practice his devious plan to control the thoughts of Bay City.
18	18	"Bad to the Bone"	Robert Munic	Stephen A. Miller	March 1, 1998	117
An old foe (Cyril O'Reilly) with the ability to alter his appearance turns Bay City against Johnny by assuming the musician's identity and going on a killing spree.
19	19	"Hitchhiker"	Nick Daniel	Glen A. Larson	April 26, 1998	118
Night Man infiltrates a mysterious crash site outside Bay City, where he finds the wreckage of a UFO and a trail of dead military men left by a rampaging alien.
20	20	"Devil in Disguise"	Rex Piano	Story by : Jerry Skeels & Randy McLaughlin; Teleplay by : Jerry Skeels & Stephen A. Miller	May 3, 1998	119
The evil diplomat Chang, who played a part in Johnny's transformation into Night Man, returns to Bay City with a deadly plan to do away with the high-flying superhero.
21	21	"Double Vision"	Robert Munic	Story by : Eric Larson; Teleplay by : Eric Larson & Stephen A. Miller	May 10, 1998	120
After running over the star athlete of a local college, Johnny discovers that the victim's amazing recovery may be thanks to a scientist's work in the field of cloning.
22	22	"Amazing Grace"	Nick Daniel	D.G. Larson	May 17, 1998	121
After a saxophonist friend is shot and killed during a gas station robbery, Johnny feels he is not doing anything effective to protect Bay City as Night Man. He is, however, killed in a car accident and goes to heaven, where an angel is tasked to send him back to Earth.

=== Season 2 (1998–99) ===
No. overall	No. in season	Title	Directed by	Written by	Original release date	Prod. code
23	1	"The Ultraweb"	Allan Eastman	Glen A. Larson	October 11, 1998	201
Night Man gains a new nemesis in the form of Kieran Keyes (Kim Coates), a sociopathic billionaire who uses his invention, the virtual reality based Ultraweb, to take over Johnny's father.
24	2	"The Black Knight"	George Mendeluk	Stephen A. Miller	October 18, 1998	202
A mysterious new crimefighter called the Black Knight declares war on a local crime organization. Night Man and enigmatic fellow vigilante are forced to work together to stop him.
25	3	"It Came from Out of the Sky"	Michael Keusch	D.G. Larson	October 25, 1998	203
An alien hunter comes to Earth to put a stop to an alien cult leader from placing the youth of Bay City under her control. This episode also states that the lightning bolt that gave Johnny his power was not a random accident, but the workings of higher powers.
26	4	"Book of the Dead"	George Mendeluk	D.G. Larson	November 1, 1998	204
Night Man must stop an evil professor from using a book of spells to unleash an ultimate form of evil.
27	5	"Fear City"	David Winning	Steve Kriozere	November 8, 1998	205
Kieran Keyes returns, this time using the Ultraweb to abduct the players of his company's video game, Fear City.
28	6	"Manimal"	Allan Eastman	Glen Larson	November 15, 1998	206
In the crossover with Glen Larson's Manimal, Night Man works with the shapeshifting Dr. Jonathan Chase and his daughter to put an end to the homicidal rampage of a time-travelling Jack the Ripper.
29	7	"Knight Life"	Mick MacKay	Stephen A. Miller	November 22, 1998	207
Night Man and the Black Knight team up again to stop a genetically engineered assassin named Slade, whose orders come from the last people either hero would suspect.
30	8	"The People's Choice"	David Winning	Stephen A. Miller	November 29, 1998	208
Keyes returns with the intent to become mayor of Bay City.
31	9	"Ring of Fire"	Michael Keusch	Stephen A. Miller	January 10, 1999	209
Night Man investigates two murders connected to an ancient legend.
32	10	"Sixty Minute Man"	Michael Robison	Glen A. Larson	January 17, 1999	210
An alien criminal who can stop time goes on a crime spree.
33	11	"Blader"	George Mendeluk	Jim Korris	January 24, 1999	211
Raleigh encounters a face from the past while Night Man combats a group of thieves using high-tech roller blades.
34	12	"Love and Death"	Richard Flower	Stephen A. Miller	January 31, 1999	212
An ex-con begins to stalk Briony.
35	13	"Burning Love"	Mick MacKay	Mark Onspaugh & Scott Thomas	February 7, 1999	213
An evil scientist seeks to harness the more than human power of a young woman.
36	14	"Scent of a Woman"	Allan Eastman	D.G. Larson	February 14, 1999	214
The tracker from "It Came from Out of the Sky" returns to Earth, protecting a princess from an assassin.
37	15	"Dust"	Allan Harmon	Steven Englehart	February 21, 1999	215
An evil Egyptian queen is accidentally resurrected by Night Man, and brainwashes Raleigh, forcing the Champion of the Dark to battle his best friend.
38	16	"Spellbound"	Brenton Spencer	D.G. Larson	February 28, 1999	216
An evil priest seeks to control a demon through the latter's half human daughter.
39	17	"Double Double"	Brenton Spencer	Steve Englehart	March 7, 1999	217
Keyes returns and kidnaps Night Man's friends in an attempt to force Night Man to work for him, and suggests, perhaps, he and Night Man are brothers.
40	18	"The Enemy Within"	Allan Eastman	Stephen A. Miller	April 25, 1999	218
Raleigh suffers a nightmare where Keyes destroys the House of Soul
41	19	"Gore"	David Winning	Glen A. Larson	May 2, 1999	219
Slade's creators strike again with an identical (and less intelligent) monster named Gore.
42	20	"Revelations"	Simon MacCorkindale	D.G. Larson	May 9, 1999	220
A bizarre encounter results in NightMan learning a dark family secret.
43	21	"Nightwoman Returns"	Brenton Spencer	Michael Gleason	May 16, 1999	221
Nightwoman seeks Night Man's help to protect a queen and her infant son from the woman's evil husband and his voodoo priestess.
44	22	"Keyes to the Kingdom of Hell"	Allan Eastman	Stephen A. Miller	May 23, 1999	222
Johnny must clear his name and rescue Raleigh when Keyes frames him for assault.
