= The Strangers (Malibu Comics) =

Comic book series created and written by Steve Englehart

- Cover to Strangers #1, art by Rick Hoberg and Tim Burgard.

Publication information
- Publisher: Malibu Comics; Marvel Comics
- Main character(s): Atom Bob; Electrocute; Grenade; Lady Killer; Spectral; Yrial; Zip-Zap

Creative team
- Created by: Steve Englehart; Rick Hoberg

The Strangers is the title of a comic book series created and written by Steve Englehart. It was originally drawn by Rick Hoberg for Malibu Comics' Ultraverse imprint which was bought by Marvel Comics during the 1990s.

The Strangers consisted of a group of random passengers on a cable car who were struck by what they believed to be a bolt of lightning, but was actually a "jumpstart": one of the bursts of energy was emitted by the Entity from the Moon, which transformed them into "Ultras".

== History ==
=== Getting established ===
On June 24, 1993, San Francisco, a cable car goes out of control and crashes into a car driven by Johnny Domino. This drives a piece of metal into his brain. This accident causes Johnny to no longer need sleep and to develop the ability to hear evil thoughts, which led to his becoming the Ultra-Hero, Night Man. The passengers all develop super-powers to a various degree.

The six who would become the Strangers later gather at the spot of the crash site and come into conflict with the sorceress Yrial. This continues into the next issue, which also has the first appearance of recurring adversaries, TNTNT.

Elana came to sponsor the team, having developed a fortune in the fashion business. The Strangers teamed up with Hardcase and Choice, and together they invaded Aladdin's Groom Lake facility. After this, Elena gives them all pagers, when they are called in to battle the villain named Deathwish. Their adversary turns out to be another cable car passenger who has killed an entire block of people. He is soon defeated. In this issue, the Strangers develop a working relationship with police officer Captain Jacob Rowe. He had become the San Francisco police department liaison with 'Ultras', super-powered beings.

=== Break-Thru ===
In a strange night, strange phenomenas appeared in the sky: the moon was colored blue, the common people were driven into a madness and various Ultras had strange visions. The Strangers joined Hardcase and other ultraheroes in a fight against the minions of the villain Rex Mundi's, who tried to captured Amber Hunt, who was acting like a herald for the madness.

In an attempt to discover the source of their powers, the Strangers steal a shuttlecraft from the villain J.D. Hunt, the same man who once had Electrocute as a sexual toy. The shuttle was being stored on a military base. This brings them into conflict with the rookie superhero Prototype, spokesman for Ultratech corporation. On the way to the successful moon encounter, they destroy a monstrous infestation of a Russian space station.

In the moon they meet the ultras Hardcase, Choice, Prime, Mantra, and The Solution. All the Ultraheroes discovered the source of the "Jumpstart Effect" which has been granting people powers all across Earth. Alongside other ultraheroes, they protect the Entity, a crashed alien starship that was causing the Jumpstart Effect, from attack from Mundi's minions. It is soon allowed to return home.

=== More villainy ===
Upon return to Earth, they are rescued from the consequences of stealing the craft by base commander Captain Christopher Dugan. Night Man had solved murders on Dugan's base, making him more receptive to the efforts of super-humans. Even when informed one of the Strangers was gay, Dugan indicates it matters little. In the same issue, Yrial's people force her to come home.

The Strangers get a clue as to where Yrial is being held and follow. They end up fighting super-powered pirates and these people were some of the cable car passengers.

Grenade and Electrocute later become a romantic couple. The team helps Hardcase and his partner Choice invade the Groom Lake facility of the mysterious organization Aladdin. Spectral reveals he is gay, to the acceptance of all his friends. Around this time, they confront J.D Hunt's personal enforcers, TNTNT.

Grenade gets into deep trouble when his girlfriend is re-programmed by her original makers, Nu-Ware. With the additional help of the mystical Teknight, he believes he will be able to defeat TNTNT. Electrocute also attacks, defeating the two heroes.

=== J.D. Hunt Jr. ===
J.D. Hunt's son, knowing the Strangers held his father prisoner, visits the hero's headquarters, temporarily located at Labrava Fashions, on Pier 25. He negotiates with the only two Strangers left, Zip-Zap and Spectral. He threatens to have the other heroes sold off unless they make the trade. Despite Grenade and Teknight having rescued themselves from the prison, the two need additional help in escaping. Spectral's mechanically talented friend Mike adjusts Electrocute's systems, preventing them from being overridden in the same manner again.

At the time of this incident, Len and Yrial are in Europe in an attempt to help Atom Bob. They encounter dangers on a mysterious mountain.

It was at one of Elana's shows where the serial killer Rafferty attacks. Despite threats to kill one of the heroes, Rafferty only murders an old lady, right in front of the group.

Frustrated that he is unable to use his powers effectively and corrupted by demonic magic, Atom Bob ends up a villain, while Night Man exposes him.

== Membership ==
The Strangers were an Ultra-hero team consisting of:

- Electrocute is a gynoid (female android) named "Candy", created as an elaborate sex toy by billionaire villain J.D. Hunt. She develops sentience after the accident and becomes a superhero with the Strangers. She has the ability to project bolts of electricity, as well as a highly durable body.
- Atom Bob (Bob Hardin) is an art student who gains the ability to rearrange matter on the molecular or atomic levels.
- Grenade (Hugh Fox) is a close friend of Bob, and has the ability to fire explosive blasts.
- Lady Killer (Elena La Brava) is a fashion designer, has tracking ability and can hit what she aims for.
- Spectral (Dave Castiglone) is able to envelop himself in different colored flames, each color granting him a different power: red (enhanced strength and aggression), orange (fire manipulation), yellow (flight), green (healing and plant manipulation), blue (water manipulation and ability to breathe underwater), indigo (space-vacuum survival), and violet (protection). Castiglone is later revealed to be gay.
- Yrial is a sorceress from a magic flying city.
- Zip-Zap (Leon Balford) is a teenager who gained super-speed.
- Teknight (Theodoric) is a former king with tech abilities.

== Possibility of revival ==
In 2003, Steve Englehart was commissioned by Marvel to relaunch the Ultraverse with the most recognizable characters, pitching the arrival of the Strangers to Earth-616, but the editorial decided not to resurrect the Ultraverse imprint. This version from Englehart would have featured a group of popular Ultraverse heroes waking up in the main Marvel Universe. The lineup would have consisted of Hardcase, Mantra, Prime, Sludge, Rune, Lord Pumpkin, Lady Killer, Night Man, Rhiannon, and Atom Bob. The characters would have remained as permanent mainstays in the Marvel Comics following the comic series.

In June 2005, when asked by Newsarama whether Marvel had any plans to revive the Ultraverse (including the Strangers), Marvel editor-in-chief Joe Quesada replied:

Let's just say that I wanted to bring these characters back in a very big way, but the way that the deal was initially structured, it's next to impossible to go back and publish these books.

There are rumors out there that it has to do with a certain percentage of sales that has to be doled out to the creative teams. While this is a logistical nightmare because of the way the initial deal was structured, it's not the reason why we have chosen not to go near these characters, there is a bigger one, but I really don't feel like it's my place to make that dirty laundry public.

== In other media ==
The Strangers (save for Lady Killer and Yrial) appear in the final two episodes of the Ultraforce animated series. According to Steve Englehart, via his personal website, this was supposed to be a backdoor pilot for a Strangers animated series, but plans were cancelled following Marvel's purchase of Malibu. There was also a Strangers game in production for the SNES and Sega CD. The game was set to be produced by Allan Becker, written by Steve Englehart, designed by Mike Giam, and worked on by Steve Hughes. It was designed as a playable comic, similar to Ultraverse: Prime, and each level would begin with a comic-paneled introduction. The game was set to feature many new villains, including one named the Chameleon who was created by Scott Sava. The game would have also featured Strangers villains TNTNT, and Teknight would have been part of the team roster.
