= Night Man =

Night Man may refer to:

- Night Man (character), a superhero from Marvel Comics
  - Night Man (TV series), a superhero television series, loosely based on the character
- Nightman, the job of sewage collector
