= Mike W. Barr =

American writer (born 1952)

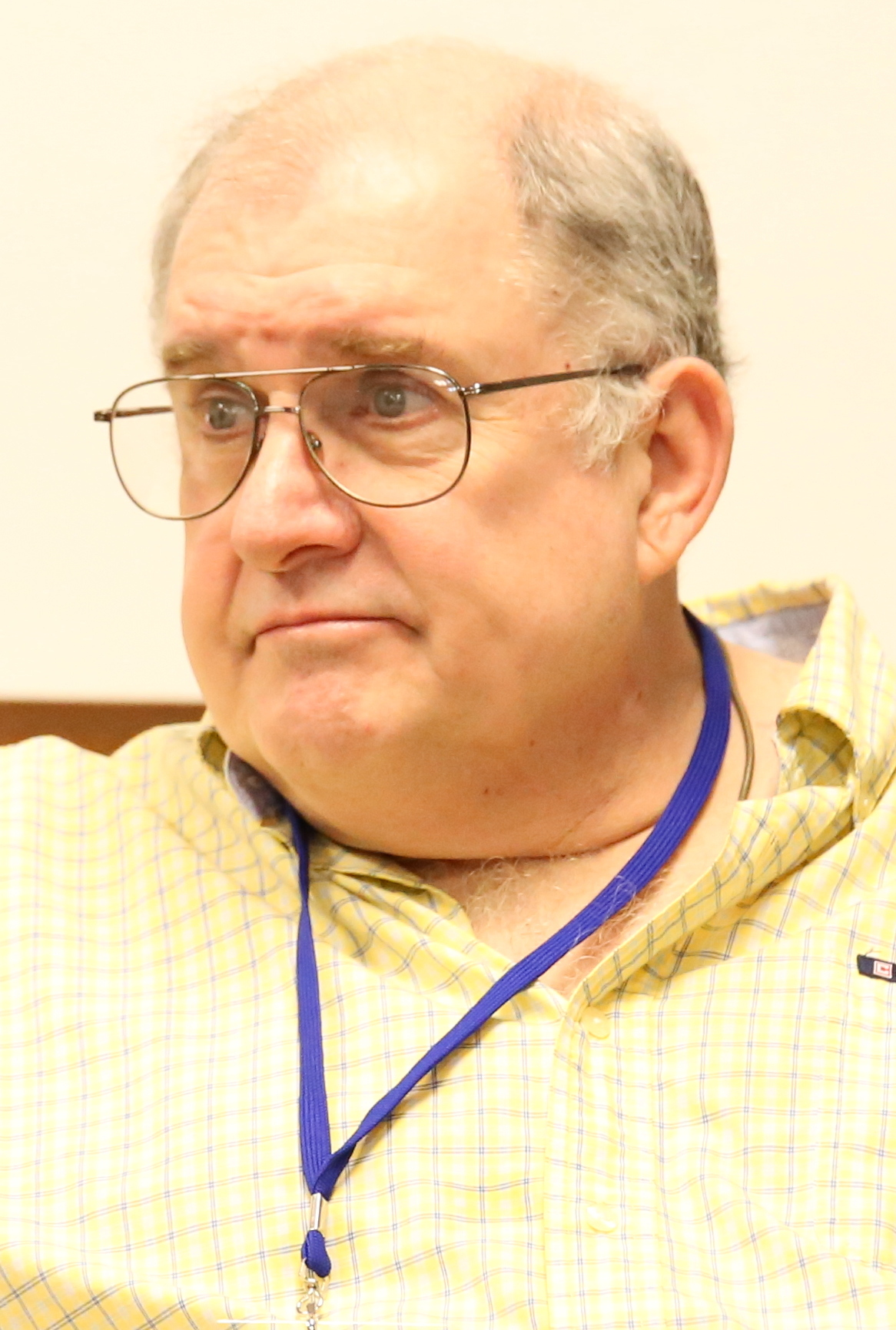
- Barr in 2015
- Born: May 30, 1952 (age 74) Akron, Ohio, U.S.
- Area: Writer
- Pseudonym: Mike Barr
- Notable works: Batman and the Outsiders; Batman: Son of the Demon; Batman: Year Two; Camelot 3000; Detective Comics; Maze Agency
- Awards: Inkpot Award, 2008

Mike W. Barr (born May 30, 1952) is an American writer of comic books, mystery novels, and science fiction novels.

He is especially known for the many Batman-related comic titles he wrote, including Batman & the Outsiders (which he co-created), Batman: Son of the Demon, The Outsiders, and the storyline Batman: Year Two. He also created and wrote Camelot 3000 for DC Comics. His creator-owned series Maze Agency was nominated for the Eisner Awards as 'Best New Series'.

Barr co-created the characters Katana, Halo, Geo-Force, Looker, Sebastian Faust, Reaper and Technokrat, and the supervillain team Masters of Disaster for DC Comics. He also created Mantra for Malibu Comics' Ultraverse.

Barr has written for every one of the first four incarnations of Star Trek: Star Trek, Star Trek: The Next Generation, Star Trek: Deep Space Nine and Star Trek: Voyager, in either comic book or other media.

== Career ==
=== Comics ===
Barr's debut as a comics professional came in DC Comics' Detective Comics #444 (Dec. 1974 – Jan. 1975), for which he wrote an eight-page back-up mystery feature starring the Elongated Man. Another Elongated Man story followed in Detective Comics #453 (Nov. 1975). He wrote text articles and editorial replies in letter columns for the next few years. By mid-1980 he was writing regularly for both DC and Marvel, including stories for Mystery in Space, Green Lantern, The Brave and the Bold, Marvel Team-Up, and a Spider-Man/Scarlet Witch team-up in Marvel Fanfare #6.

Legion of Super-Heroes #277 (July 1981) saw him take on editorial duties at DC, a position he would hold until 1987. In December 1982, he and artist Brian Bolland began Camelot 3000, a 12 issue limited series that was one of DC Comics' first direct market projects. Barr and artist Trevor Von Eeden produced the first Green Arrow limited series in 1983. When the long running The Brave and the Bold series came to its conclusion with issue #200 (July 1983), it featured a preview of a new Batman series, Batman and the Outsiders by Barr and artist Jim Aparo, which would be described by DC Comics writer and executive Paul Levitz as being "a team series more fashionable to 1980s audiences." The Masters of Disaster were among the supervillains created by Barr and Aparo for the series. Barr wrote every issue of the original series, and its Baxter paper spinoff, The Outsiders that did not include Batman and introduced Looker. After the series' cancellation in February 1988, it was revived in November 1993 by Barr and artist Paul Pelletier.

He was one of the contributors to the DC Challenge limited series in 1986 and wrote the "Batman: Year Two" storyline in Detective Comics #575–578 (June–Sept. 1987) which followed up on Frank Miller's "Batman: Year One". Barr introduced the Reaper in Detective Comics #575 (June 1987) and returned to the character in the Batman: Full Circle one-shot in 1991. Another project from 1987 was the Batman: Son of the Demon graphic novel which was drawn by Jerry Bingham. This title, and Barr's work on Batman with artist Alan Davis have been cited by Grant Morrison as key inspirations for their own run on the Batman title. Barr's sequel, Batman: Bride of The Demon, was published in 1991. Barr's Batman stories and scripts have been adapted into several mediums, including episodes of Batman: The Animated Series.

From 1989 to 1990, he took over DC's Doc Savage series from Dennis O'Neil, which saw the 1930s super-scientist taken to the present day. It was also notable as featuring Doc Savage's first-ever team-up with The Shadow, another popular hero of the pulp magazine era and inspiration for Batman. The two characters appeared together in a four-issue story, The Conflagration Man, that crossed back and forth between each character's DC comic book series.

In 2007, he wrote a two-part story for the pages of DC's JLA: Classified (#47–48, Jan–Feb 2008), returned to the Outsiders with Outsiders: Five of a Kind — Katana/Shazam #1 (Oct. 2007), contributed to Tokyopop's Star Trek: The Manga, and relaunched Maze Agency at IDW Publishing. He has scripted many of Bongo Comics' The Simpsons titles, including a Christmas story for 2010. His other comics work includes Mantra for Malibu Comics and his creator-owned series Maze Agency that was published by Comico Comics, Innovation Publishing, Caliber Press, IDW and Scout Comics.

In a comic-related work, in 2007, Barr wrote The Silver Age Sci-Fi Companion for TwoMorrows Publishing. Dedicated in memory of famous DC writers and editors Julius Schwartz, John Broome and Gardner Fox, this 144-page book provide a comprehensive index, background information and issue by issue data on DC Comics science fiction characters and series of 1950s–1970s like Adam Strange, The Atomic Knights, Space Museum, Star Hawkins, Star Rovers, and others.

In 2009, he wrote The Wolverine Files, an encyclopedia about the Marvel character in style of a S.H.I.E.L.D. files collection, for Simon & Schuster.

In 2011, he wrote the original graphic novel Star Wars: The Clone Wars – The Starcrusher Trap for Dark Horse Comics. The same year he wrote the oneshot DC Retroactive: Batman - The '80s, with art by Jerry Bingham.

Barr returned to his character Katana with the six-part limited series Suicide Squad Most Wanted: Deadshot & Katana in 2016, and again with Suicide Squad: Black Files, another limited series featuring Katana, in 2019. He also wrote a ten-page Katana story for DC's Spring Breakout #1 published in 2024.

=== Prose ===
In 1980, the short story "The Gamesmen of Earth Prime" by Barr and Denny O'Neil with illustrations by Michael Golden was published in Epic Illustrated #3.

Two Maze Agency prose stories by Mike W. Barr were published: one in Noir #1 by Alpha Productions in 1993, the other in Sex, Lies and Private Eyes by Moonstone in 2009.

In 2003, his Star Trek novel Gemini featuring the classic TOS crew was published by Pocket Books. It was followed by another Star Trek novel, The Centre Cannot Hold, which was part two of the miniseries Star Trek: Mere Anarchy and published as ebook in 2006.

His Star Wars short story "Death in the Catacombs" was published in Star Wars Insider in 2004. Barr also contributed to the Silver Age Sentinels short story anthology Path of the Bold from Guardians of Order in 2004.

In May 2010, the Invisible College Press published Barr's science fiction/fantasy novel, Majician/51, about the discoveries of a scientist working at Area 51.

== Awards ==
Mike W. Barr received an Inkpot Award in 2008.

== Bibliography ==
=== Comics ===
==== Alpha Productions ====
- The Detectives #1 (Maze Agency story) (1993)

==== Bongo Comics ====
- Bart Simpson #81 (2013)
- Simpsons Comics #167, 172, 204 (2010, 2013)
- Simpsons Summer Shindig #8 (2014)
- Simpsons Super Spectacular #5, 10–11 (2007, 2010)

==== Caliber Press ====
- Maze Agency vol. 2 #1–3 (1997)

==== Comico Comics ====
- Maze Agency #1–7 (1988–1989)

==== Dark Horse Comics ====
- Dark Horse Comics #14–15 (1993)
- Dark Horse Presents #117 (Aliens), 119 (Predator), 135 (1997–1998)
- G.I. Joe #1–4 (limited series) (1995–1996)
- G.I. Joe #1–4 (ongoing) (1996)
- Star Wars: The Clone Wars – The Starcrusher Trap SC (2011)
- X-Wing Rogue Squadron ½ (1997)

==== DC Comics ====
- Action Comics #537–538 (1982)
- The Adventures of Superman Annual #9 (1997)
- The Adventures of the Outsiders #33–38 (1986)
- Arak, Son of Thunder #7–8 (1982)
- Batman #327, 329, 331, 334, 353, Annual #8–9, Special #1 (1980–1985)
- Batman '66 #22 (2015)
- Batman and the Outsiders #1–32, Annual #1–2 (1983–1986)
- Batman: Bride of the Demon HC (1991)
- Batman: Dark Knight Dynasty HC (1998)
- Batman: Full Circle #1 (1991)
- Batman: Gotham Knights #25 (Batman Black and White) (2002)
- Batman: In Darkest Knight #1 (1994)
- Batman: Legends of the Dark Knight #21–23 (1991)
- Batman: Reign of Terror #1 (1999)
- Batman: Son of the Demon HC (1987)
- Batman: Two-Face Strikes Twice #1–2 (1993)
- Beware the Batman #5 (2014)
- The Brave and the Bold #169, 177, 184, 190, 192, 194–195, 198–200 (1980–1983)
- Bruce Wayne: The Road Home: Outsiders #1 (2010)
- Camelot 3000 #1–12 (1982–1985)
- Cancelled Comic Cavalcade #1 (The Ray story) (1978)
- DC Challenge #5 (1986)
- DC Comics Presents #22, 39, 42, 47, 58, 83 (1980–1985)
- DC Retroactive: Batman – The '80s #1 (2011)
- DC Special Blue Ribbon Digest #23 (Green Arrow) (1982)
- DC's Spring Breakout #1 (Katana story) (2024)
- Detective Comics #444, 453, 488, 490–491, 500, 507, 569–581 (1974–1987)
- Detective Comics vol. 2 #27 (2014)
- Doc Savage #7–24, Annual #1 (1989–1990)
- Elvira's House of Mystery #7 (1986)
- The Flash #313 (1982)
- Green Arrow #1–4 (1983)
- Green Lantern #131, 154–165 (1980–1983)
- Heroes Against Hunger #1 (1986)
- House of Mystery #269, 279, 285, 288, 291, 320 (1979–1983)
- JLA: Classified #47–48 (2008)
- JSA: Classified #38–39 (2008)
- Justice League Adventures #8 (2002)
- Legends of the Dark Knight 100-Page Super Spectacular #3 (2014)
- Mystery in Space #111–112, 115–117 (1980–1981)
- The New Teen Titans #37 (1983)
- The Outsiders #1–28, Annual #1, Special #1 (1985–1988)
- Outsiders vol. 2 #1α, #1Ω, #2–24, #0 (1993–1995)
- The Outsiders: Five of a Kind – Katana/Shazam #1 (2007)
- Saga of the Swamp Thing #2–8 (Phantom Stranger backup stories) (1982)
- Secret Origins vol. 2 #6, 10, 44, 47 (1986–1990)
- Secrets of Haunted House #15, 28 (1979–1980)
- The Shadow Strikes #5–6 (1990)
- Showcase '93 #4–5 (1993)
- Star Trek #1–16, Annual #1–2, Movie Special #1–2 (1984–1987)
- Star Trek: Deep Space Nine/Star Trek: The Next Generation #1–2 (1994)
- Star Trek: The Next Generation/Star Trek: Deep Space Nine #1–2 (plot) (1994)
- Star Trek: The Next Generation Annual #4 (1993)
- Suicide Squad Black Files #1–6 (Katana) (2018–2019)
- Suicide Squad Most Wanted: Deadshot & Katana #1–6 (2016)
- Superman 80–Page Giant #1 (1999)
- Tales of the Green Lantern Corps #1–3 (1981)
- Time Warp #1, 3 (1980)
- The Unexpected #192, 196, 200, 205–213 (1979–1981)
- Weird War Tales #70, 84, 93, 99–100, 106–108 (1978–1982)
- Who's Who #2, 4, 8–19, 22–23, 25–26 (1985–1987)
- Who's Who Update '87 #1–2, 4–5 (1987)
- World's Finest Comics #274–278, 282–284, 288, 300 (1981–1984)

==== Eclipse Comics ====
- Real War Stories #1–2 (1987, 1991)

==== Egmont ====
- Agent X9 #9/2007, 9/2009

==== First Comics ====
- E-Man vol. 2 #4 (full story), #23 (one page story) (1983–1985)

==== Heroic Publishing ====
- Liberty Girl #3 (2007)

==== IDW Publishing ====
- Maze Agency vol. 3 #1–3 (2005–2006)

==== Image Comics ====
- Big Bang Comics #30 (2000)

==== Innovation Publishing ====
- Maze Agency #8–23, Annual #1, Special #1 (1989–1991)

==== Kitchen Sink Press ====
- The Spirit #30 (among others) (1981)

==== Malibu Comics ====
- Break-Thru #1–2 (1993–1994)
- Godwheel #3 (1995)
- Lord Pumpkin/Necromantra #1–4 (1995)
- Mantra #1–24, Giant-Size #1 (1993–1995)
- Mantra: Spear of Destiny #1–2 (1995)
- Sludge #4, 12 (1994)
- Star Trek: Deep Space Nine #1–6, Annual #1 (1993–1995)
- Ultraverse Premiere #0 (Mantra story) (1993)
- Ultraverse Zero: The Death of the Squad #1 (1995)
- Wrath #1–6, 8–9, Giant-Size #1 (1994)

==== Marvel Comics ====
- The Amazing Spider-Man #220 (1981)
- Captain America #241, 257 (1980–1981)
- Epic Illustrated #3 (text story with Denny O'Neil) (1980)
- Mandrake the Magician #1–2 (1995)
- Mantra vol. 2 #∞, 1, 3 (1995)
- Marvel Fanfare #6 (Spider-Man/Scarlet Witch); #46 (Fantastic Four); #49 (Two-Gun Kid) (1983, 1990)
- Marvel Preview #23 (1980)
- Marvel Spotlight vol. 2 #8 (Captain Marvel) (1980)
- Marvel Team-Up #102, 105 (1981)
- Power Man and Iron Fist #76 (1981)
- The Savage Sword of Conan #60 (text article) (1981)
- Shroud #1–4 (1994)
- Solo Avengers #8 (Henry Pym) (1988)
- Spider-Man Unlimited #1 (1993)
- Star Trek #5–6, 17 (1980–1981)
- Star Wars #49 (1981)
- What If...? #26 (Captain America); #28 (Daredevil) (1981)
- X-Men: Curse of the Mutants - X-Men vs. Vampires #2 (Angel story) (2010)

==== Marvel UK ====
- Killpower: The Early Years #1–4 (1993)

==== Scholastic ====
- Star Wars Kids #6–15 (1997–1998)

==== Scout Comics ====
- Maze Agency vol. 4 #1 (2023)

==== Titan Magazines ====
- Star Wars Comic #1 (2014)

==== Tokyopop ====
- Star Trek the Manga: Shinsei Shinsei (anthology) (2006)

==== TSR ====
- 13: Assassin - Comics Module #1–4 (1990)

==== Valiant Comics ====
- Bloodshot #8 (story idea) (1993)

=== Television ===
- Batman: The Animated Series (1993)
  - "Paging the Crime Doctor" (ep. 53 story with Laren Bright, teleplay by Randy Rogel and Martin Pasko)

Preceded by Jack C. Harris	Legion of Super-Heroes editor 1981–1982	Succeeded by Laurie S. Sutton
Preceded by Len Wein	The Flash editor 1981–1982	Succeeded by Len Wein
Preceded by Len Wein	Unknown Soldier editor 1981–1982	Succeeded by Len Wein
Preceded by Len Wein	World's Finest Comics editor 1982	Succeeded by Dave Manak
Preceded by Joey Cavalieri	Detective Comics writer 1986–1987	Succeeded by Jo Duffy
Preceded by Justin Gray	JLA: Classified writer 2008	Succeeded by Andrew Kreisberg
