= Len Strazewski =

American comic book writer (1955–2026)

- Born: February 16, 1955
- Died: April 27, 2026 (aged 71)
- Area: Writer
- Notable works: The Fly; Justice Society of America; Phantom Lady; Prime

Len Strazewski (February 16, 1955 – April 27, 2026) was an American comic book writer.

== Life and career ==
Strazewski was born on February 16, 1955. He worked on the DC Comics titles Starman, The Flash, Justice Society of America, Phantom Lady, The Fly. He also worked on a comic version of Speed Racer for NOW Comics. His Street Fighter II comic for Malibu Comics was canceled after three issues by Capcom because of his choice to have Ken Masters murdered in the second issue. Also at Malibu, he wrote Prime, Elven and Prototype. He was a professor of journalism at Columbia College Chicago and a member of the school's Board of Trustees. Strazewski died on April 27, 2026, at the age of 71.
