= Fly Girls =

Fly Girl(s) or Flygirl may refer to:

- Fly Girls (dance troupe), dance troupe from the television series In Living Color
- Fly Girls (book) about 5 female pioneers of aviation and women's equality from the 1920's and 1930's in the US: Amelia Earhart, Louise Thaden, Ruth Elder, Ruth Rowland Nichols, and Florence Klingensmith
- "Fly Girl" (Flo song), 2023
- "Fly Girl" (Kulcha song), 1994
- "Fly Girl" (Queen Latifah song), 1991
- Fly Girls (TV series), a 2010 reality television series on The CW network
- Swedish Fly Girls, a 1971 sex comedy film
- Vernice "Flygirl" Armour, the first African-American female naval combat pilot.
- "A Fly Girl", 1985 rap hit by New York hip-hop group Boogie Boys

== Characters ==
- Flygirl (Archie Comics), a super hero character in Archie Comics
- Fly Girl, an alias of the fictional character Lauren Cooper
- Flygirl (Malibu Comics), an Ultraverse character

== See also ==
- "B-Boys & Flygirls", song on the 1999 Bomfunk MC's album In Stereo
