= Batman: Son of the Demon =

Graphic novel by Mike W. Barr

- Front cover for the softcover edition of Batman: Son of the Demon, art by Jerry Bingham.
- Date: 1987
- Main characters: Batman; Ra's al Ghul; Talia al Ghul
- Publisher: DC Comics

Creative team
- Writers: Mike W. Barr
- Artists: Jerry Bingham
- ISBN: 0930289250

Batman: Son of the Demon is a 1987 graphic novel by writer Mike W. Barr and artist Jerry Bingham, published by American company DC Comics. It was released in both hardcover and softcover formats.

Although it was deemed to be non-canon, Grant Morrison used elements of this story in the 4-issue story "Batman and Son" in 2006. DC Comics published a new printing of Batman: Son of the Demon in 2006 featuring new cover art by Andy Kubert for the first time in standard comic book size with a cover price of $5.99 US, tying in with the "Batman and Son" arc.

== Plot ==
The story centers on the eco-terrorist and head of the League of Assassins, Ra's al Ghul aiding Batman in his quest to solve the murder of Harris Blaine, one of Gotham City's most prominent scientists. Ra's al Ghul and Batman turn out to be searching for the same man, the terrorist known as Qayin. Qayin is a rogue assassin who had murdered Ra's al Ghul's wife Melisande, mother to his favorite daughter and heir-apparent, Talia, by throwing her into an early version of a Lazarus Pit. Batman has shared a stormy, on-again, off-again romance with Talia for many years, despite his ideological conflict with Ra's. During the course of the storyline, Batman has time to properly romance Talia. When Batman asks if there should have been a marriage ceremony of some sort, Talia replies that there already has been: her father had previously, in a bid to stop Batman from interfering with his plans, performed such a ceremony in the tradition of his own country, where only the consent of the bride was needed to constitute a marriage. Talia soon becomes pregnant, and the prospect of a family has a profound effect on Batman's demeanor, making him more risk-averse and softening his typically grim outlook. Batman is nearly killed protecting the recently pregnant (and still very dangerous in her own right) Talia from an attack by the assassin's agents. Observing Batman's dangerous and overly protective behavior, Talia resolves that she cannot allow him to continue to act in such a manner, as he will almost certainly be killed. To that end, Talia claims to have miscarried. Crushed by the news, Batman returns to his typically grim disposition, and he and Talia agree to have the marriage dissolved. Batman returns to Gotham, never knowing Talia is still carrying his child.

The child, a boy, is born and left with an orphanage, and soon adopted by a Western couple. The only hint of his impressive heritage is a jewel-encrusted necklace, a gift Bruce gave to Talia just before Qayin attacked Ra's' HQ.

== Critical reaction ==
IGN ranked Batman: Son of the Demon #6 on a list of the 27 greatest Batman graphic novels, calling it "the perfect Ra's al Ghul tale" and "a brilliant, perfectly paced story".
