= Star Trek: Deep Space Nine - Dax's Comet =

Star Trek: Deep Space Nine - Dax's Comet is a graphic novel by Jerry Bingham, Tim Eldred, and Bruce McCorkindale published by Boxtree in 1995.

== Contents ==
Star Trek: Deep Space Nine - Dax's Comet is a collection of two Star Trek: Deep Space Nine comics stories: Lapse is a story featuring Odo, while Dax's Comet involves a comet that devastates Bajor every 2,000 years when it passes close to the planet.

== Reception ==
Nick Peers reviewed Star Trek: Deep Space Nine - Dax's Comet for Arcane magazine, rating it a 2 out of 10 overall. Peers comments that "If these two stories reflect Malibu's DS9 franchise, then it is a very poor relation to DC's Next Generation collection. Buy DC's The Star Lost or Mondala Imperative to see Star Trek work in the comic format."
