= Maze Agency =

American mystery comic book series

The Maze Agency
- The cover to The Maze Agency #1 (December 1988), art by Adam Hughes.

Publication information
- Publisher: Comico Comics; Innovation Publishing; Caliber Comics; IDW Publishing; Scout Comics
- Schedule: Monthly
- Format: Standard
- Publication date: Dec. 1988–June 1989; Dec. 1989–Nov. 1991 (first series); 1997 (second series); Nov. 2005–Jan. 2006 (third series)
- No. of issues: 23, 3, 3
- Main character(s): Jennifer Mays; Gabriel Webb

Creative team
- Created by: Mike W. Barr
- Written by: Mike W. Barr

Collected editions
- Maze Agency vol. 1: ISBN 1-933239-06-9

The Maze Agency is an American mystery comic book series created by Mike W. Barr and first professionally published in 1988. It revolves around a pair of detectives (Jennifer Mays and Gabriel Webb) and their adventures solving puzzling murders. The Maze Agency was a 1989 nominee for the Will Eisner Comic Industry Awards for Best New Series.

== Publication history ==
The Maze Agency was first published privately by Barr with art by Alan Davis. A full series, initially with art by Adam Hughes and Rick Magyar, was published by Comico Comics for 7 issues in 1988-1989. Shortly before Comico ceased operations, the title moved to Innovation Publishing for another 16 issues (8-23), plus an annual and a special, running until 1991. Alpha Productions released a single Maze Agency story in the anthology comic, The Detectives #1 in 1993, as well as a prose story in Noir #1 in 1994. Caliber Comics relaunched the title in 1997/1998 as a three-issue miniseries. IDW Publishing printed a three issue miniseries in 2005/2006 as well as reprinting #1-5 of the original series in trade paperback. A second prose story appeared in the anthology Sex, Lies and Private Eyes, published by Moonstone in 2009. Scout Comics revived the series with Barr joined by artist Silvano Beltramo, with a single issue published in December 2023.

== Fair-play whodunits ==
The Maze Agency was one of the few mystery comic books to "play fair" with the reader — i.e. giving out sufficient clues for the reader to solve the mystery. Creator and writer Mike Barr however, in a February 2004 interview, admitted that "some of the Maze stories, frankly, are not fair-play whodunits to the reader, in that the story is possibly too complex for the reader to solve". He cited as comparison an anecdote wherein the two creators of Ellery Queen were giving an interview, and one said "Ellery Queen is always fair to the reader", to which the other replied, "Ellery Queen is always fair to the reader if the reader is a genius". As Mike W. Barr is a fan of the series of Ellery Queen mysteries, the comic has much the same feel, sharing qualities such as the occasional "challenge to the reader" to solve the mystery, and an incorrect solution being offered by a character before the real answer is revealed. Barr even used Ellery as a guest star in Maze Agency #9.

== Characters ==
Jennifer Mays is a smart, tough, and sexy ex-CIA agent who runs the private detective agency for which the comic is named. Gabriel Webb is one of the few people to see her softer, tender side.

Gabriel Webb is a true-crime writer who longs to create more cerebral stories than his sensationalist editors like. He is a little scatterbrained and easily distracted, but has a first-rate deductive mind. Although he is romantically involved with Mays and helps her with many of her cases, he feels that the relationship makes accepting her repeated offer to join her business professionally inappropriate.

Detective Roberta Bliss is an NYPD homicide detective of Puerto Rican descent whom Webb and Mays often deal with in solving cases. She is sometimes annoyed by their tendency to complicate cases, but knows that they have the ability to crack murders that she would have a hard time solving alone.

Ashley Swift is the head of the rival Swift Detective Agency, and Mays' former boss. She is a good detective, though not as good as Mays and Webb, but her arrogance has a habit of rubbing her ex-employee the wrong way.
