= Ultraverse =

Fictional shared universe comic book imprint

- Ultraverse logo in the original black and white

Publication information
- Schedule: Varied
- Formats: Varied
- Genre: Superhero
- Publication date: 1993–1997

The Ultraverse is a defunct comic book imprint published by the American company Malibu Comics which is currently owned by Marvel Comics. The Ultraverse is a shared universe in which a variety of characters – known within the comics as Ultras – acquired super-human abilities.

== History ==
In June 1993, it was reported that Malibu Comics was launching a new shared universe which the company hoped would provide similar opportunities for comics writers much like how Image Comics provided new opportunities for artists with an emphasis on creator ownership. Development on the Ultraverse began in 1992 initially under the name of the Megaverse until it was learned another company already had claim to the name. After several days worth of development, Ultraverse developed into a shared universe wherein it was described as being 90% based on real life while the remaining 10% which differentiated itself would be from the inclusion of superheroes. The Ultraverse line was launched by Malibu Comics during the "comics boom" of the early 1990s, when a number of new and existing publishers introduced new universes featuring superheroes, debuting in June 1993 with ongoing series Prime, Hardcase and The Strangers. The project included writers Mike W. Barr, Steve Englehart, Steve Gerber, James D. Hudnall, Gerard Jones, James Robinson, Len Strazewski, and Larry Niven. It emphasized tight continuity between the various series, making extensive use of crossovers, in which a story that began in one series would be continued in the next-shipping issue of another series. Various promotions for special editions or limited-print stories also encouraged readers to sample issues of the entire line. The Ultraverse line came to dominate Malibu's catalog, and an animated series featuring one of the line's teams, Ultraforce, aired from 1994 to 1995.

As American comics sales declined in the mid-1990s, Malibu canceled lower-selling series. The company was purchased by Marvel Comics in November 1994. Marvel reportedly made the purchase to acquire Malibu's then-groundbreaking in-house coloring studio, with some speculation that it was to prevent DC Comics from buying it to increase their market share. Within the Marvel Comics multiverse, the Ultraverse was designated as Earth-93060. Crossovers between Malibu and Marvel began, such as Rune/Silver Surfer.

In 1995, Malibu published a crossover story called "Black September" featuring the members of Ultraforce and Marvel's Avengers in issues #8–10 of Ultraforce, Ultraforce/Avengers: Prelude, Avengers/Ultraforce #1 (published by Marvel), Ultraforce/Avengers #1, and Black September "#∞". The crossover ended with the Black Knight character trapped in the Ultraverse, and the cancellation of all of the series in the Ultraverse line. Seven of the series – Prime, Mantra, The Night Man, Ultraforce, Rune, Siren, and The All New Exiles – were "rebooted" with issues numbered "#∞", followed by volume 2, in which popular Marvel characters were briefly featured to attract Marvel's regular readers

This version of the Ultraverse lasted until the end of 1996, with a single one-shot (Ultraverse: Future Shock #1) published in February 1997 to wrap up unresolved plot lines.

== Status ==
In 2003, Steve Englehart was commissioned by Marvel to relaunch the Ultraverse with the most recognizable characters, pitching the permanent arrival of Ultraverse characters to Earth-616, but the editorial decided not to resurrect the Ultraverse imprint. This version from Englehart would have featured a group of popular Ultraverse heroes waking up in the main Marvel Comics Universe. The lineup would have consisted of Hardcase, Mantra, Prime, Sludge, Rune, Lord Pumpkin, Lady Killer, Night Man, Rhiannon, and Atom Bob. The characters would have remained as permanent mainstays in the Marvel Comics following the comic series.

In June 2005, when asked by Newsarama whether Marvel had any plans to revive the Ultraverse, Marvel editor-in-chief Joe Quesada replied:

Let's just say that I wanted to bring these characters back in a very big way, but the way that the deal was initially structured, it's next to impossible to go back and publish these books.

There are rumors out there that it has to do with a certain percentage of sales that has to be doled out to the creative teams. While this is a logistical nightmare because of the way the initial deal was structured, it's not the reason why we have chosen not to go near these characters, there is a bigger one, but I really don't feel like it's my place to make that dirty laundry public.

Senior Vice President of Publishing Tom Brevoort has stated in the past that the reason Marvel cannot discuss the Ultraverse properties is because of non-disclosure agreements in place with certain parties, which has been speculated to pertain to Scott Mitchell Rosenberg's contractual position as "ongoing producer deal for all Malibu Comics properties".

In February 2021, when Simon Spurrier, writer of the 2021 Black Knight series, was asked about the possibility of the series taking place in the Ultraverse, he said: "None percent, I'm afraid".

After several years of not even mentioning the Ultraverse in the comics, a past storyline featuring the character Rune was referenced directly in the 2023 Marvel Unlimited publication Who Is Adam Warlock.

== Titles ==
Title	Issues	Initial cover date	Final cover date	Notes
Angels of Destruction	1	1996		One-shot
Avengers/Ultraforce	1	1995		Crossover published by Marvel Comics.
Battlezones: Dream Team²	1	1996		One-panel drawings featuring characters from Marvel and Malibu.
Black September	∞	1995		One-shot following the reality-changing effects of the crossover with the Marvel Universe.
Break-Thru	1, 2	1993	1994	Mini-series and the first crossover of the Ultraverse, following the chief heroes to the moon.
Codename: Firearm	0, 1–5	1995	1995	Six-issue limited series by Malibu Comics for its Ultraverse line. It was written by David Quinn and Marv Wolfman, with art by Gabriel Gecko and Klebs Junior. The series was about an English sleeper agent for the Lodge named James Hitch, who was given a second personality, Peter Cordova, to aid in his cover. Alec Swan, the original Firearm, appeared as a backup story.
Conan vs Rune	1	1995		Crossover published by Marvel Comics.
Curse of Rune	1–4	1995	1995	Mini-series
Eliminator	0, 1–3	1995	1995	Mini-series that follows Rick Pearson, an ex-agent of the Aladdin organization, rebuilt like a cyborg.
Elven	1–4	1994	1995	Four issue comic book mini-series written by Len Strazewski and drawn by Aaron Lopresti. It was about a character with abilities similar to those of Prime, save that instead of being a fan of comic superheroes such as Superman, Elven was a fan of Elfquest and similar fantasy depictions of elves. Her Ultra form and abilities reflected this, with the liquid substance produced by her body shaping itself into an Elf-like appearance (albeit with a very non-elfin female bodybuilder physique in her initial appearances), and her powers subconsciously channeled into magic-like applications.
Exiles	1–4	1993	1993	Written by Steve Gerber and illustrated by Paul Pelletier, with plot contributions from Tom Mason, Dave Olbrich, and Chris Ulm. It is known for the creators' deliberate decision (as explained in the afterword to the last issue) to flout the accepted comic-book trope that a group of random people, who were plucked from their ordinary lives and told that they must join together to fight evil and prevent disaster, would become an effective team. Instead, key strategic mistakes led to the team's newest recruit, Amber Hunt, triggering a catastrophic explosion that killed or maimed everyone else on the team and destroyed their headquarters. This occurred at the end of issue #4, although issue #5 had been falsely solicited months in advance in order to preserve the shock value of the team's unexpected death and the comic's abrupt cancellation; retailers who had been misled into ordering Exiles #5 were subsequently reimbursed.
Firearm	0, 1–18	1993	1995	Comic book series created by writer James Robinson and artists Howard Chaykin and Cully Hamner, which lasted 18 issues, with an additional #0 issue. #0 included a 35-minute Firearm short film, on VHS. The series was about Alec Swan, a private investigator who, against his own wishes, becomes embroiled in cases involving the strange and the ultra-human.
Flood Relief	1	1993		One-shot. The story is a charity-driven comic about the American floods of 1994.
Foxfire	1–4	1996	1996	After Black September, it follows Rose Autumn, a half-human hybrid from the future.
Freex	1–18	1993	1995	Short-lived comic book series from created by Gerard Jones and Ben Herrera. It concerned a team of teenage superheroes. The group that would come to call themselves the Freex were apparently created when a group of newborn infants were injected with a substance called "wetware", a mix of mutated DNA and nanotechnology that had been created by the advanced but isolated underground society called the Fire People. The nurse who injected these children would later go on to become the superhero Contrary, who utilized other Fire People technology to assist and organize Ultraforce. It also had a special, Giant Size Freex.
Godwheel	0, 1–3	1995	1995	4-issue mini-series, it included a 'preview' book. The ultra-heroes and villains are transported to the Godwheel by the God Argus. They ended finding the Asgardian God Thor.
Hardcase	1–26	1993	1995	Also had a special: Hardcase Premiere Edition
Lord Pumpkin	0	1994		One-shot
Lord Pumpkin / Necromantra	1–4	1995	1995	Mini-series, it contained two flipbooks, Lord Pumpkin and Necromantra.
Mantra	1–24	1993	1995	Follows an immortal warrior named Lukasz who inhabits the corpses of different people throughout time. After a battle with his enemy Boneyard, Lukasz was left in the corpse of the woman Eden Blake and forced to become a sorceress. The series had a special, Giant Size Mantra.
Mantra vol. 2	∞, 1–7	1995	1996	
Mantra - Spear of Destiny	1–2	1995	1995	Mini-series
Mutants Vs. Ultras: First Encounters	1	1996	1996	One-shot reprinting crossovers between Marvel and Malibu characters.
Power of Prime	1–4	1995	1995	Mini-series
Prime	½, 1–26	1993	1995	Ongoing series. It had the specials Prime: Gross and Disgusting and Prime #½
Prime vol. 2	∞, 1–15	1995	1996	
Prime / Captain America	1	1996		One-shot
Prime vs. the Incredible Hulk	1	1996		One-shot
Prototype	0, 1–18	1993	1995	A series about a superhero owned by a company. Ultratech build the armor Prototype for advertising. The series follow the second Prototype, Jimmy Ruiz, and his predecessor in the armor Bob Campbell. The comic also had a special, Giant Size Prototype.
Ripfire	0	1994	1994	One-shot
Rune	0–9	1994	1995	It had a special, Giant Size Rune.
Rune vol. 2	∞, 1–7	1995	1996	
Rune: Hearts of Darkness	1–3	1996	1996	Mini-series
Rune/Silver Surfer	1	1995		One-shot crossover that told the journey of Rune to the Marvel Universe and his obtaining of the Infinity Gems from the Infinity Watch.
Rune vs Venom	1	1996		One-shot
Siren	∞, 1–3	1995	1995	Mini-series that follows Jennifer Pearson, thief and daughter of Eliminator, in her travels in the Marvel Universe.
Siren Special	1	1996		One-shot
Sludge	1–12	1993	1994	It had a special, Sludge: Red X-Mas.
Solitaire	1–12	November 1993	September 1994	Superhero comic book created by Gerard Jones and Jeff Johnson in 1993 for Malibu Comics. It was published consistently from November 1993 until September 1994, when the series was, with the eighth issue, turned into a mini-series to be cancelled at the twelfth issue. Solitaire is a crime-fighting superhero. He uses detective skills and a network of street-level informants to wage a one-man war on crime a la DC's Batman. He is not, however, without superpowers, as Batman is. Solitaire has a rapid healing ability (like Marvel's Wolverine) which allows him to recover from stab wounds, gougings, and even gunshots.
The Night Man	1–23	1993	1995	Series that follow the adventures of the jazz musician Johnny Domingo. He gained the ability to hear the thoughts of evil people in the same way as The Strangers. The series also had an annual, The Night Man: The Pilgrim Conundrum Saga #1.
The Night Man vol. 2	∞, 1–4	1995	1995	
The Night Man vs Wolverine	1	1995	1995	One-shot
The Night Man / Gambit	1–3	1996	1996	Mini-series
The All-New Exiles	∞, 1–11	1995	1996	At one point, Marvel bought the publication rights for the Ultraverse comics. In the "Godwheel" event, it was established that the Ultraverse is part of the Marvel Multiverse, meaning that travel between the main Marvel Universe and the Ultraverse is possible, albeit difficult. One of the consequences was that a new team of Exiles was formed and included among them characters from the main Marvel Universe.
The All-New Exiles vs X-Men	0	1996	1996	One-shot
The Phoenix Resurrection	1	1996		One-shot crossover between the Ultra-heroes and the X-Men.
The Phoenix Resurrection: Aftermath	1	1996		One-shot
The Phoenix Resurrection: Genesis	1	1996		One-shot
The Phoenix Resurrection: Revelations	1	1996		One-shot
The Solution	0, 1–17	1993	1995	Follows a team of four ultra-mercenaries: Dropkick, Outrage, Shadowmage, and Tech, in their fights against other mercenaries.
The Strangers	1–24	1993	1995	A series about six people that were traveling in a train when it was struck by lightning, gaining superpowers. The series also had an annual, The Strangers: The Pilgrim Conundrum Saga #1.
Ultra Monthly	1–6	1993	1993	In-universe magazine about Ultra-heroes.
Ultraforce	0, 1–10	1994	1995	Follows the foundation of the Main team of Ultra-heroes: Hardcase, Prime, Prototype, Topaz, Ghoul and Contrary. The Marvel superhero Black Knight joins in the later issues.
Ultraforce vol. 2	∞, 1–15	1995	1996	After Black September, Ultraforce had a new roster, with the Black Knight as team leader.
UltraForce / Avengers Prelude	1	1995		One-shot. The Ultraforce meet Sersi of the Eternals.
UltraForce / Avengers	1	1995		A crossover between the two teams, this one-shot follows Avengers/Ultraforce and leads into the Black September event.
UltraForce / Spider-Man	1	1996		One-shot
Ultraverse Double Feature: Prime and Solitaire	1	1994		One-shot
Ultraverse Future Shock	1	1997		One-shot
Ultraverse Origins	1	1994		One-shot. Origin pieces originally released as back-up material in various comics.
Ultraverse Premiere	0	1993		One-shot and also a miniseries in flipbooks of other books, issues #1-11.
Ultraverse Unlimited	1–2	1996	1996	Mini-series
Ultraverse Year Zero: The Death of the Squad	1–4	1995	1995	Miniseries that told the adventures of the first team of Ultra-heroes: The Squad.
Ultraverse Year One	1	1994		One-shot that summarizes the first year of Ultraverse.
Ultraverse Year Two	1	1995		One-shot that summarizes the second year of Ultraverse.
Warstrike	1–7	1994	1994	The series followed Brandon Tark, a mercenary with precognitive powers that activated when he was near death. It had a special, Giant Size Warstrike.
Witch Hunter	1	1996		One-shot
Wrath	1–9	1994	1994	The series followed an Aladdin agent. It had a special, Giant Size Wrath.

== Crossovers with Marvel Comics ==
- Godwheel
- Rune/Silver Surfer
- Spine (Lord Pumpkin #1, Hardcase #23, Ultraforce Vol. 1 #8, Curse of Rune #2, Mantra Vol. 1 #22, Eliminator #3, Lord Pumkin #4, The Nightman #22)
- Black September
  - Countdown to Black September (Ultraforce Vol. 1 #8-10, Ultraforce/Avengers Prelude)
  - Avengers/Ultraforce
  - Ultraforce/Avengers
  - Siren #∞ -3
  - Ultraforce Vol. 2 #∞-12
  - Prime Vol. 2 #∞-5
  - All New Exiles #∞-11
  - Rune Vol. 2 #∞-7
- Prime vs. the Incredible Hulk
- Nightman vs. Wolverine
- The All-New Exiles vs. X-Men
- The Phoenix Resurrection
- Conan vs. Rune (also Conan #4 and Conan the Barbarian #4)
- Ultraforce/Spider-Man
- Nightman/Gambit
- Prime/Captain America
- Rune vs. Venom
- Ultraverse Unlimited #1-2
- Ultraverse Future Shock

== Other media ==
- A video game based on the character Prime was released in 1994.
- In 1995, a 13-episode animated series featuring the characters of Ultraforce was produced by DIC Productions, L.P. and Bohbot Entertainment. The series also featured Sludge, the Night Man, and the Strangers.
- A live action series featuring the character of Night Man aired in syndication from September 1997 to May 1999.
- The Ultraforce character Topaz (created by Mike W. Barr) was portrayed by Rachel House in the film Thor: Ragnarok (2017) and the short film Team Daryl, produced by Marvel Studios.

== Sources ==
- Misiroglu, Gina (2012). "Ultraverse Heroes". The Superhero Book: The Ultimate Encyclopedia of Comic-Book Icons and Hollywood Heroes. Visible Ink Press. pp. 377–379. ISBN 9781578593972.
- Keith Dallas, Jason Sacks (2018). "1991". American Comic Book Chronicles: The 1990s. TwoMorrows Publishing. pp. 99–100. ISBN 9781605490847.
