= Jerry Bingham =

American artist

- Born: Gerald Joseph Bingham Jr. June 25, 1953 (age 73) Chicago, Illinois, U.S.
- Area: Penciller
- Notable works: Batman: Son of the Demon; Marvel Team-Up
- Awards: Kirby Award, 1984; Golden Apple Award, 1987; Emmy Award, 1998–1999

Gerald Joseph Bingham Jr. (born June 25, 1953) is an American artist who has worked in the fields of comic books, commercial illustration, and design. He is known for his artwork on Marvel Team-Up and the DC Comics graphic novel Batman: Son of the Demon.

== Biography ==
Given his first break by veteran comics artist Dan Adkins, Bingham's first published comics work was a Green Arrow backup story in World's Finest Comics #251 (June–July 1978). From there, Bingham drew comics for Marvel Comics, First Comics, TSR, Malibu Comics, Dark Horse Comics, Heavy Metal, and others. He drew the Batman: Son of the Demon graphic novel in 1987, which introduced a character later revealed to be Damian Wayne. This graphic novel reputedly "restored DC Comics to first place in sales after fifteen years."

Leaving comics in the late 1990s, Bingham moved to the West Coast, where he did production art for the movies, designing props, special effects and monster make-up. He contributed design work for Walt Disney Parks and Resorts, shopping centers, Universal Studios, and the Hollywood Christmas Parade. In addition, Bingham has illustrated paperback, game, and magazine covers.

== Education ==
Bingham attended the American Academy of Art College, the Scottsdale Artists School, the California Art Institute, and UCLA.

== Awards ==
- Jack Kirby Award, 1984 – Best Graphic Album: Beowulf
- Golden Apple Award, 1987 – Best Graphic Novel: Batman: Son of the Demon
- Primetime Emmy Award for Outstanding Animated Program, 1999 – Background Designer (animation): Todd McFarlane's Spawn

== Bibliography ==
=== DC Comics ===
- Alien Nation #1 (movie adaptation)(1988)
- Army at War #1 (1978)
- Batman Confidential #50–54 (2011)
- Batman: In Darkest Knight #1 (1994)
- Batman: Son of the Demon graphic novel (1987)
- DC Retroactive: Batman - The '80s #1 (2011)
- Ghosts #72 (1979)
- G.I. Combat #211 (1978)
- Hawkman vol. 3 #27 (1995)
- House of Mystery #270, 274 (1979)
- Mystery in Space #112 (1980)
- Outsiders #13 (1986)
- Secret Origins vol. 2 #3 (Captain Marvel) (1986)
- Secrets of Haunted House #33 (1981)
- Time Warp #5 (1980)
- The Warlord #103 (1986)
- Weird War Tales #70 (1978)
- Who's Who in the DC Universe #16 (1992)
- Who's Who: The Definitive Directory of the DC Universe #5, 7, 19–20, 23 (1985–1987)
- World's Finest Comics #251 (Green Arrow) (1978)

=== First Comics ===
- Beowulf graphic novel (1984)
- Warp! #10–15, 17–18 (1984)

=== HM Communications, Inc. ===
- Heavy Metal #v7#3, #v7#7 (1983)

=== Marvel Comics ===
- The Amazing Spider-Man #366–367 (1992)
- Black Panther #13–15 (1979)
- Captain America #246 (1980)
- Iron Man #131–135, Annual #5 (1980–1982)
- Marvel Premiere #51–53 (1979–1980)
- Marvel Super-Heroes vol. 2 #3 (Captain Marvel) (1990)
- Marvel Team-Up #99, 101, 103–104 (1980–1981)
- Marvel Two-in-One #61–63, 66, 76 (1980–1981)
- Midnight Sons Unlimited #1 (1993)
- The Spectacular Spider-Man Annual #13–14 (1993–1994)
- Spider-Man Unlimited #1 (1993)
- Spider-Woman #27 (1980)
- Web of Spider-Man Annual #10 (1994)
- What If #27 (1981)
- X-Factor #113 (1995)

==== Epic Comics ====
- Onyx Overlord #1–4 (1992–1993)

==== Malibu Comics ====
- Star Trek: Deep Space Nine - Dax's Comet

Preceded by Jack Kirby	Black Panther artist 1979	Succeeded by Denys Cowan (in 1988)
Preceded by Steve Scott	Batman Confidential artist 2011	Succeeded by n/a
