= Night Man (TV series) =

- Also known as: NightMan
- Genre: Superhero
- Created by: Glen A. Larson
- Based on: Night Man by Steve Englehart
- Written by: Mark Jones; Glen A. Larson; Steven Kriozere; James Korris; D. G. Larson; Stephen A. Miller; Steve Englehart
- Directed by: Nick Daniel; Mark Jones; Glen A. Larson; Allan Eastman; Robert Munic; Rex Piano; David Price; David Winning
- Starring: Matt McColm; Derek Webster; Felecia M. Bell; Earl Holliman; Michael Woods; Derwin Jordan; Jayne Heitmeyer
- Theme music composer: Marc Bonilla; Glen A. Larson
- Composers: Marc Bonilla (season 1); Graeme Coleman (season 2)
- Countries of origin: United States; Canada
- Original language: English
- No. of seasons: 2
- No. of episodes: 44 (list of episodes)

Production
- Executive producers: Karen Corbin; Glen A. Larson; Gary Gittelsohn; Scott Mitchell Rosenberg
- Producers: Janet Curtis-Larson; Scott Thomas; Keri Young
- Running time: 45–48 minutes
- Production company: Village Roadshow Pictures (1997–1998) (season 1) ProSieben Media (1997–1998) (season 1) Atlantis Films (1997–1998) (season 1) WIC Entertainment (1998–1999) (season 2) Alliance Atlantis Productions (1998–1999) (season 2) Crescent Entertainment (1998–1999) (season 2) Glen Larson Entertainment Network, Inc. Tribune Entertainment

Original release
- Network: Syndication
- Release: September 19, 1997 – May 17, 1999

Night Man is a superhero television series, developed by Glen A. Larson, that aired in syndication from September 15, 1997, to May 17, 1999. The series is loosely based on the character from the 1993 The Night Man comic book published, through the Ultraverse imprint, by Malibu Comics (which was later purchased by Marvel Comics), and was created by writer Steve Englehart, who also wrote three episodes of the series.

The show stars Matt McColm as the title character, a superhero whose real name was Johnny Domino, a saxophonist. Night Man is also one of the few series to cross over with characters from Larson's previous series. In the episode "Manimal", Johnny allies with Professor Jonathan Chase, the star of the short-lived 1980s series Manimal.

== Plot summary ==
Johnny Domino is a well-known San Franciscan jazz musician who is accidentally struck by a lightning bolt in a freak cable-car accident. The strike allows him to telepathically recognize evil but robs him of the ability to sleep.

Although Night Man has no other superhuman powers of his own, he owns a special blue-caped bulletproof black bodysuit which gives him several abilities, including flight, holographic camouflage-style invisibility and advanced sight functions through the round red lens over the left eye of his mask including the ability to see in the dark and fire a laser beam. Although he often fights new enemies in each episode as the series progresses, his nemesis is computer technologies billionaire Kieran Keyes (Kim Coates), who would slay Johnny's father, Frank Domino, in the premiere of the second and final season.

== Cast ==
- Matt McColm as Johnny Domino/Night Man, a saxophonist who is struck by lightning while playing inside a cable-car. As a result, his brain gains radio-like properties, able to "pick up" certain mental frequencies. He is now attuned to the "frequency of evil", which enables him to "hear" evil thoughts and evil-doers wherever he goes. He wears a bulletproof bodysuit, as well as an anti-gravity belt that enables him to fly, a cape with holographic camouflage-style invisibility properties and a mask with a round red lens over his left eye, which gives him the ability to see/aim in the dark and fire a laser beam.
- Earl Holliman as Frank Dominus, Johnny's father and former police detective. As a result of production being moved to Vancouver, Canada for Season 2, he is killed by villain J.D. Gunt in the premiere of Season 2. In the comics, this character was named Eddie Domingo who worked as a security guard and was Night Man's sole confidante.
- Derek Webster (Season 1) and Derwin Jordan (Season 2) as Raleigh Jordan, Johnny's friend and confidante, as well as the developer of Night Man's armor.
- Felecia M. Bell (credited as Felecia Bell) as Jessica Rodgers, owner of the House of Soul, the club where Johnny performs. Her character was axed in Season 2 after production moved to Vancouver.
- Michael Woods as Lieutenant Charlie Dann, Frank's former partner and apprentice. His character was axed in Season 2 after production moved to Vancouver.
- Jayne Heitmeyer as Lieutenant Briony Branca, a detective who investigates criminal actions in Season 2.

=== Guest appearances ===
- Patrick Macnee as Dr. Walton, Johnny's psychiatrist in season 1. He usually advises him on how to use his newfound abilities.
- Taylor Dayne as Carla Day/Black Arrow, a singer who is Johnny's love interest. Although she only appeared in the pilot episode, she is mentioned a few more times during the series' run.
- Enuka Okuma as Crystal, a singer who works at the club.
- Fabiana Udenio as Rachel Lang, an alien villainess who approaches and hypnotizes Johnny (turning him into a hedonistic and selfish person) in order to discover NightMan's secrets and use his powers for her own will.
- Shane Brolly as Joran/Chrome, a supervillain who uses telekinetic powers, granted to him through the same lightning bolt that struck Johnny. He seeks to take over Bay City and destroy NightMan, but is overpowered and defeated by him. He later reappears and joins forces with Rachel Lang to destroy Johnny and discover NightMan's secrets. In the end, both are defeated for good.
- Jacinda Barrett as Lucy Devlin/Selene, a monstrous witch/sorceress who assumes a female human form. She is hired by Jessica as a magician entertainer at the House of Soul anniversary party, but she inadvertently uses black magic techniques to send Charlie, Frank and Raleigh to another dimension. After NightMan saves them and travels to his own dimension (where he reunites with his deceased mother), he is able to overcome her tricks and defeat her, but by the end of the episode, it is unclear if the whole thing was reality or just one of Johnny's dreams.
- Ric Young as Chang, a Chinese diplomat whose goal is to cause a third World War using a high-technology neutron cannon weapon.
- Simon MacCorkindale as Jonathan Chase, the titular hero from the Manimal series crossing over into the episode of the same name.
- Saskia Garel as Jasmine, the Jazz singer who works at the club.

In addition, Little Richard, Jerry Springer, and Donald Trump made special appearances as themselves in "Whole Lotta Shakin'", "House of Soul", and "Face to Face", respectively. David Hasselhoff also makes a surprise cameo as a villain in the first episode.

== Home media ==
Lionsgate Entertainment released a complete series on DVD on June 12, 2018. The box displays the claim that it is "based on the Marvel Comics comic book" when in actuality it is based on a Malibu Comics comic book which became a subsidiary of Marvel Comics.

== Awards and nominations ==
Year	Award	Category	Recipient	Episode	Result
1999	Leo Awards	Best Musical Score in a Dramatic Series	Graeme Coleman	"Dust"	Won
