= Avengers/Ultraforce =

Comic crossover

- Sersi and the Black Knight on the cover of UltraForce / Avengers Prelude.

Publication information
- Publisher: Malibu Comics (Ultraforce) and Marvel Comics (Avengers)
- Publication date: July - October 1995
- No. of issues: 2
- Main character(s): Avengers, Ultraforce

Creative team
- Written by: Glenn Herdling (Avengers/Ultraforce); Warren Ellis (Ultraforce/Avengers)
- Artist(s): Angel Medina and M. C. Wyman (Avengers/Ultraforce); George Pérez (Ultraforce/Avengers)

The Avengers/Ultraforce event is a two-part intercompany crossover between Malibu Comics and Marvel Comics. The first issue, Avengers/Ultraforce, was written by Glenn Herdling with art by Angel Medina and M. C. Wyman. The sequel, Ultraforce/Avengers, was written by Warren Ellis with art by George Pérez, who also illustrated wraparound covers on both issues.

== Plot ==
The Asgardian god Loki enters the Ultraverse and collects the Infinity Gems from the possession of various Ultraverse's heroes, also discovering the existence of a seventh Gem: Ego. Loki learns the Infinity Gems were originally part of a gestalt entity known as "Nemesis". The Ego Gem possessed the Avenger Sersi when she arrived to Ultraverse from Earth-616.

The slaying of Nemesis caused a reality-changing effect in the Ultraverse called the Black September.

== Publication history ==
- Ultraforce/Avengers Prelude #1: "The Swords Are Drawn..." (Malibu Comics, July 1995) (it is numbered 11 in the indicia continuing Ultraforce's numbering)
- Avengers/Ultraforce #1 (Marvel Comics, October 1995)
- Ultraforce/Avengers #1: "Becoming More Like God" (Malibu Comics, Fall 1995)
