= Sludge (comics) =

Comic book series set in the Ultraverse

- Cover to Sludge #1, art by Aaron Lopresti and Gary Martin.

Publication information
- Publisher: Malibu Comics
- First appearance: Sludge #1 (October 1993)
- Created by: Steve Gerber; Gary Martin; Aaron Lopresti

In-story information
- Alter ego: Frank Hoag
- Species: Human mutate
- Team affiliations: NYPD
- Abilities: Superhuman strength and durability; Regeneration; Fatal touch

Sludge is a comic book series from Malibu Comics, set in the Ultraverse. It was created by Steve Gerber, Gary Martin and Aaron Lopresti. It depicted a dirty cop called Frank Hoag who was killed by the local mafia and was transformed after his death into a superpowered and viscous creature, called Sludge.

== Publication history ==
Sludge made his first appearance in Sludge #1, dated October 1993, written by Steve Gerber and illustrated by Aaron Lopresti. As part of the Ultraverse imprint, the comic was set within a shared universe of super-powered beings conceptualized by writers and artists of Malibu comics. Sludge ran for only twelve issues, with one special: Sludge: Red X-Mas. A second special, Sludge: Swamp of Souls, was planned but never completed. Sludge also appeared in other Ultraverse books. After the Black September event, Sludge appeared in the first two issues of Foxfire (1996).

== Character history ==
Frank Hoag was an experienced but corrupt NYPD detective who finally decided to change to take action when he was asked by his mob bosses (John Paul Marcello and Vittorio Sabatini) to kill a fellow dirty cop. When he refused, his own murder is ordered; he dies by a hail of bullets as well as a bomb. The explosion covers him with chemicals, which combine with the sewage from where the mobsters dump his body. The chemicals had regenerative properties and tried to heal Hoag, but combined the sewer substances with his body, transforming him into a huge mass of living slime. He awakens with a raging anger against criminals and an inability to think and speak coherently, with many words coming out replaced with one that sounds only vaguely similar, such as 'munch' instead of 'mutual'. There existed a connection between the chemicals that transformed Frank Hoag into Sludge and Dr. Gross' research. Dr. Gross conducted the experiments that allowed Kevin Green to transform into Prime. One of Sludge's allies was Chas, a blind homeless man who sold newspapers. He didn't comprehend that Frank has transformed; he only thinks Frank has gained an 'underwater voice'. Frank took a newspaper from Chas, claiming to be good for it and reads about deaths in the sewers. Marcello hired an assassin called Bloodstorm to kill the creature and he attacked Sludge with an explosive arrow.

Frank meets Shelley Winters, a sensationalistic reporter, in the sewers. She was investigating the same case that interests Frank and she discovers Veffir Voon Iyax, a humanoid, albino alligator-man. Veffir had killed the two people and many more. During the fight, Veffir claims he is from another world, and that nobody who meets him lives. Despite this, Sludge kills him in battle and demands 35 cents from Winters. He uses this to pay back Chas. Sludge also met the villain Lord Pumpkin alias The Pump who offered the creature a swift death if he obeys him. The Pump was beginning a drug sales operation using a new drug called Zuke, that was extracted from a carnivorous plant from the Godwheel. Lord Pumpkin also had a young henchmen known as Pistol. The Dragon Fang, a local Asian mafia, began a drug war against Lord Pumpkin. Marcello joined them in the fight. Lord Pumpkin sent Sludge against Marcello, who found death at the hands of the creature. Sludge also found that the zuke had the property to cure his body's condition, so he helped Pumpkin more. Vittorio Sabatini inherited the mafia and hired Bloodstorm again. The Pump and Sludge defeated the mercenary and drugged him with Zuke. The drugged Bloodstorm was sent to Sabatini and slaughtered the mafia, but the Dragon Fang began new attacks against Pumpkin gang, killing much of his henchmen. They sent a new agent, a battle cyborg against Pumpkin, destroying the candle that gave life to his body. Pistol took the Pumpkin head, hoping to revivify the villain, but desisted after a time. Lord Pumpkin resurrected in other book.

== Powers and abilities ==
Sludge has tremendous strength and durability, as well as vast regenerative capabilities, allowing him to heal from near-fatal wounds in seconds. Submersion in water speeds up the process. He does not need food or air and is immune to most chemical toxins. Sludge can cause spontaneous tissue growth in others by touch.

== Possibility of revival ==
In 2003, Steve Englehart was commissioned by Marvel to relaunch the Ultraverse with the most recognizable characters, including Sludge, but the editorial decided not to resurrect the Ultraverse imprint. In June 2005, when asked by Newsarama whether Marvel had any plans to revive the Ultraverse, Marvel editor-in-chief Joe Quesada replied:

Let's just say that I wanted to bring these characters back in a very big way, but the way that the deal was initially structured, it's next to impossible to go back and publish these books.

There are rumors out there that it has to do with a certain percentage of sales that has to be doled out to the creative teams. While this is a logistical nightmare because of the way the initial deal was structured, it's not the reason why we have chosen not to go near these characters, there is a bigger one, but I really don't feel like it's my place to make that dirty laundry public.

== Appearances in other media ==
Sludge appears in the Ultraforce animated cartoon. In the series, he is an underling of Lord Pumpkin and is forced to be so due his addiction to the Zuke drug that Pumpkin created, that restores him to human form. He sacrifices himself to stop a demon plant created by Pumpkin, helping Prototype (Jimmy Ruiz).
