= Rick Hoberg =

American comics artist and animator (born 1952)

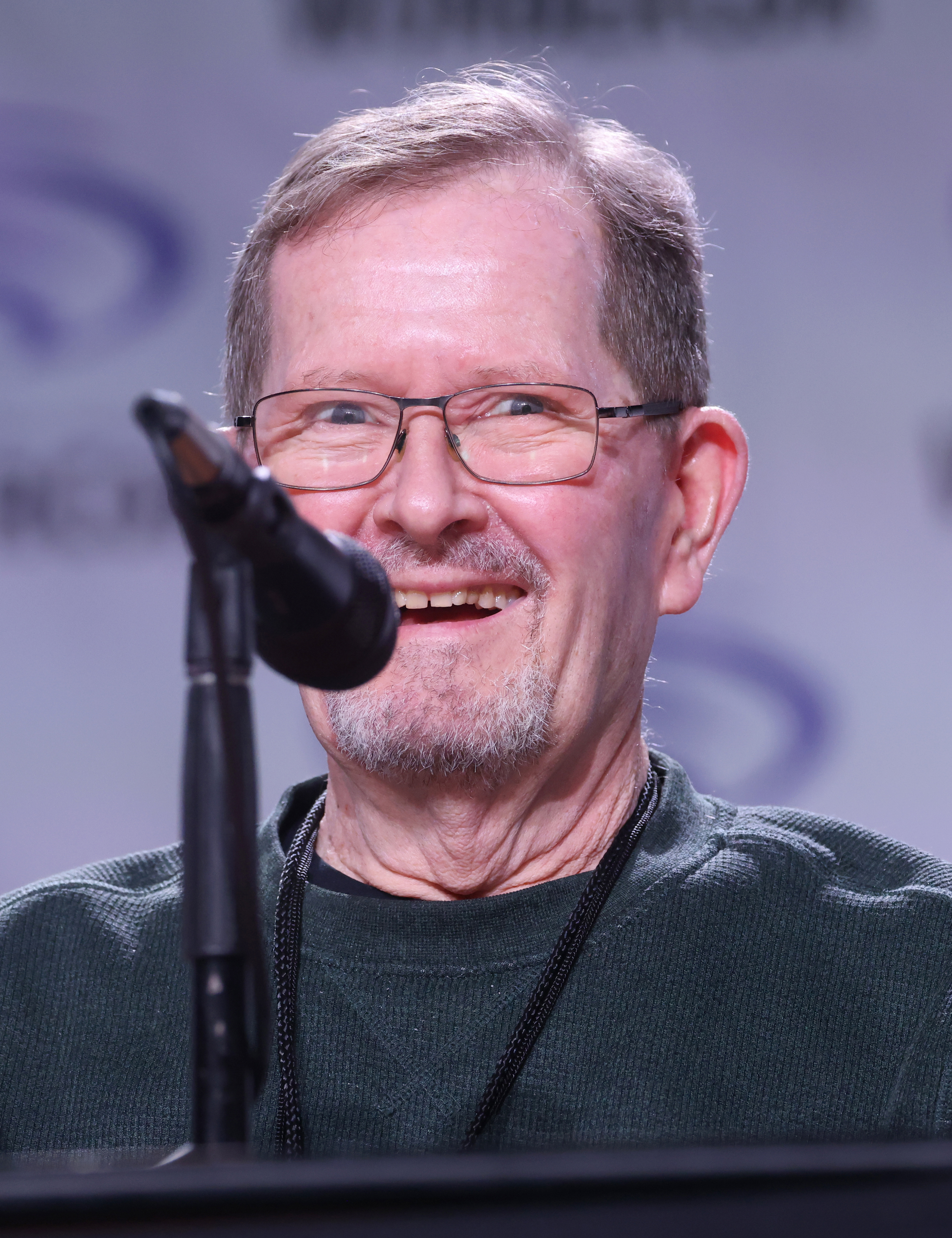
- Hoberg in 2025
- Born: Richard Renick Hoberg; June 7, 1952 (age 74) Belton, Texas, U.S.
- Area: Penciller
- Notable works: All-Star Squadron; Green Arrow; The Strangers
- Awards: Inkpot Award (1984)

Richard Renick Hoberg (/ˈhoʊbɜːrɡ/; born June 7, 1952) is an American comics artist and animator.

== Newspaper strips ==
Hoberg began his career in comic books in the mid-1970s, working for Russ Manning on Tarzan comic books for overseas distribution (1975–1976) and later assisted Manning on the Star Wars comic strip (1979–1980). Hoberg also ghosted Sunday pages for Fred Kida on The Amazing Spider-Man strip (1981–1982).

== Comic books ==
Between 1977 and 1979, Hoberg contributed artwork for Marvel Comics' The Invaders, Kull the Destroyer, Savage Sword of Conan, Star Wars, and What If...?. In the 1980s, Hoberg mainly drew for such DC Comics titles as All-Star Squadron, Batman, The Brave and the Bold, Captain Carrot and His Amazing Zoo Crew!, Checkmate, Green Arrow, Green Lantern, and Justice League of America Annual. He was one of the contributors to the DC Challenge limited series in 1986.

Writer Dennis Mallonee and Hoberg developed the format for Marvel's Official Handbook of the Marvel Universe series. They later co-created Eternity Smith, and from 1986 to 1988 Hoberg penciled that title, first for Renegade Press and then for Hero Comics. Hoberg also worked on DNAgents and Surge at Eclipse Comics (1984–1986).

In the 1990s, Hoberg spent a long stint as the penciller on Green Arrow. With writer Steve Englehart, Hoberg co-created The Strangers for Malibu Comics and penciled the title from 1993 to 1995. Hoberg also penciled select issues of DC's New Gods in 1990–1991 and Roger Rabbit for Disney (1990–1991). Since the mid-1990s, Hoberg's comics work has been sporadic.

In 2002–2003, Hoberg worked with Stefano Gaudiano on the art for the Batman Family series for DC Comics.

== Animation ==
Besides his comics work, Hoberg has been active in animation since 1978 as a storyboard artist, model designer, and layout man for Hanna-Barbera, Ruby-Spears, Filmation, Marvel Productions, Marvel Films, DIC Entertainment, Universal Studios, The Walt Disney Company, Cartoon Network, Film Roman, Warner Bros., and many other studios. Among the many animated series Hoberg has contributed to are Godzilla, Super Friends, Spider-Man and His Amazing Friends, The Incredible Hulk, G.I. Joe: A Real American Hero, Jem, Defenders of the Earth, Spider-Man, Justice League, X-Men, and Teenage Mutant Ninja Turtles. Hoberg also served as a director/producer for Marvel Productions, where he co-created the first X-Men cartoon, Pryde of the X-Men. Other animation work includes Avengers: Earth's Mightiest Heroes, Ultimate Spider-Man, War of the Worlds: Goliath, and Hulk and the Agents of S.M.A.S.H..

== Live action ==
Hoberg has done some live action film work as well on movies such as Cyborg and TV miniseries like Stephen King's It.

== Other projects ==
In addition, Hoberg has drawn line artwork for the official Star Wars style guide for Lucasfilm over the years. He is currently the Lead Cinematic Storyboard Artist at 343 Industries for Halo.

== Education ==
Hoberg received a Bachelor of Arts from the University of California, Irvine.

== Awards ==
Hoberg received an Inkpot Award in 1984.

== Bibliography ==
=== Acclaim Comics ===
- Bar Sinister #1–4 (1995)

=== Dark Horse Comics ===
- Classic Star Wars: A New Hope #2 (1994)
- Classic Star Wars: The Early Adventures #4–5, 9 (1994–1995)

=== DC Comics ===
- Action Comics #572 (1985)
- All-Star Squadron #16–18, 31–35, 38–39, 57, Annual #3 (1982–1986)
- Batman #380–382, 384–385 (1985)
- Batman and the Outsiders Annual #1 (1984)
- Batman: Family #1–6, 8 (2002–2003)
- Blackhawk #267 (1984)
- The Brave and the Bold #198–199 (1983)
- Captain Carrot and His Amazing Zoo Crew! #11, 15–20 (1983)
- Checkmate #13, 16, 19 (1989)
- DC Challenge #8 (1986)
- DC Comics Presents #61, 86 (1983–1985)
- Detective Comics #773–775 (2002)
- Green Arrow #37–38, 44–45, 49–50, 53–60, 63–66, 69–72, 75–78 (1990–1993)
- Green Lantern #162–163 (1983)
- Justice League of America Annual #1, 3 (1983–1985)
- New Gods vol. 3 #16, 19–22, 26–28 (1990–1991)
- Power Girl #1–4 (1988)
- Warlord vol. 2 #1–3 (1992)

=== Disney Comics ===
- Roger Rabbit #1–3 (1990)
- Roger Rabbit's Toontown #3 (1991)

=== Eclipse Comics ===
- The New DNAgents #11 (1986)
- Surge #1–2, 4 (1984–1985)
- Three Dimensional DNAgents #1 (1986)

=== Heroic Publishing ===
- Champions/Flare Adventures #11 (1993)
- Eternity Smith #1–9 (1987–1988)
- Flare #5 (1991)

=== Malibu Comics ===
- Night Man: The Pilgrim Conundrum Saga #1 (1995)
- Strangers #1–8, 10–12, 14–18, 23–24 (1993–1995)
- Strangers: The Pilgrim Conundrum Saga #1 (1995)
- Ultraverse Premiere #0 (1993)

=== Marvel Comics ===
- Invaders #35 (1978)
- Iron Man #209 (1986)
- Kull the Destroyer #21 (1977)
- Savage Sword of Conan #23 (1977)
- The Sensational Spider-Man vol. 2 #39 (2007)
- Star Wars #6 (1977)
- What If...? #6–7, 10, 16 (1977–1979)

=== Renegade Press ===
- Eternity Smith #1–5 (1986–1987)

Preceded by Richard Howell and Mike Machlan	All-Star Squadron penciller 1984	Succeeded by Arvell Jones
Preceded by Don Newton	Batman penciller 1985	Succeeded by Tom Mandrake
Preceded by Shawn McManus	Green Arrow penciller 1991–1993	Succeeded by Bill Marimon
