= Prime (Malibu Comics) =

Malibu Ultraverse superhero

- Cover to Prime #1, art by Norm Breyfogle, 1993.

Publication information
- Publisher: Malibu Comics; Marvel Comics
- First appearance: Prime #1 (June 1993)
- Created by: Gerard Jones; Len Strazewski; Norm Breyfogle

In-story information
- Alter ego: Kevin Green
- Species: Ultra
- Team affiliations: Ultraforce
- Notable aliases: Space Prime; Rogue Prime; Phoenix Prime; Spider-Prime
- Abilities: As Prime: Superhuman strength, stamina, and durability; Flight; Concussion beams; As Kevin: Organic exoskeleton

Prime is a superhero character created by Bob Jacob, Gerard Jones, Len Strazewski, Norm Breyfogle, and Bret Blevins. The character debuted in Prime #1 under Malibu Comics' Ultraverse imprint, and was one of the publisher's flagship characters, and a member of its superhero team Ultraforce. The character is a thirteen-year-old boy named Kevin Green with the power to transform into the physical form of a super-powered adult, but with his adolescent mind unchanged. This is a source of conflict for the character, as he is frequently placed in situations he may not be mature enough to deal with.

== Publication history ==
The character first appeared in Prime #1 (cover dated June 1993), written by Gerard Jones and Len Strazewski and illustrated by Norm Breyfogle. The series ran until August 1995, with a total of 26 issues. Breyfogle departed as regular artist after issue #12, with subsequent artists including George Pérez, Darick Robertson, and John Statema.

As part of the Ultraverse imprint, the comic was set within the company's shared universe of super-powered beings commonly referred to as "Ultras". Writers Jones and Strazewski used the book to explore a number of themes, such as the place of role models in establishing personal definitions of heroism.

After Marvel Comics purchased Malibu in 1994, the publisher began crossing characters between the two universes. This culminated in 1995 with an event known as "Black September", which incorporated the Malibu Ultraverse characters into the Marvel Universe. A second volume of the series ran from September 1995 to December 1996, with a total of 16 issues.

== Character history ==
=== Rise as Ultrahero ===
Prime began his heroic activities attacking a gym teacher that was molesting Kelly, a classmate Kevin has a crush on. Next he attacked a drug dealer and terrorist from Somalia. A scientist named Dr. Gross began the search for Prime and captured him with help of his minion Duey. Dr. Gross reveals to Prime that he intervened in his creation, when he modified some babies years before as part of a government program. Prime become enraged by the revelation and fled. Full of doubts, Prime tried to meet his idol Hardcase, and went to Hollywood to search for him, but ended up meeting Prototype, an ultra that acted as spokesperson for Ultratech. The two young heroes didn't get along and fought. Prime proved stronger but caused a fire and fled. Later, Prime fought a demon that took the form of a cartoon character, and was recruited by the U.S. government for a special mission on the Moon. He met Colonel Samuels, who tried to use Prime as a weapon. He experimented on Prime's body, transforming it to a space resistant version.

=== Break-Thru ===
Prime was ordered to travel to the Moon and when he arrive he saw figures of his parents and his crush Kelly trying to control him and was finally convinced to protect the mysterious entity of the Moon. Various ultras (Hardcase, Choice, Mantra, Prototype, The Strangers and The Solution) arrived to the moon in the search of the entity. Minions of the villain Rex Mundi arrived too and fought Prime. Prime almost lost consciousness in the middle of the battle, but was rescued by Mantra. All the Ultraheroes discovered the source of the "Jumpstart Effect" which has been granting people powers all across Earth. Alongside other ultraheroes, Prime protected the Entity, a crashed alien starship that was causing the Jumpstart Effect, from attack from Mundi's minions. It is soon allowed to return home.

Prime returned to Earth followed by Prototype. In Earth, Prime confronted Dr. Gross again, and was help by the sorcerer Mantra in the battle. He was recaptured by Colonel Samuels. Worrying about his son, Russell Green hired the Private Detective Alec Swan, alias Firearm, who infiltrated the army base of Samuels and rescued Kevin. Prime, impressed by Swan, decided to create a new form of his Prime body, similar to Swan, with a scar in the face, calling himself Rogue Prime. Defeated, Samuels took his life.

=== Ultraforce ===
Later Prime formed part of Ultraforce and fought the subterrain warlord Attalon. Prime had the idea of forming the team, after listening to a remark from Hardcase and begin recruiting members. He ended fighting Prototype again. In the aftermath of the invasion of Attalon, Prime joined other heroes, an presented to the President of United States in the White House. When Hardcase was being defeated by N.M.E., Prime arrived to save the hero and destroyed the mechanic menace. Shortly after, Prime was attacked by the serial killer Rafferty. Prime and some friends went to the Godwheel.

=== Black September ===
Prime and Prototype met the Marvel hero Black Knight when he arrived to the Ultraverse. Prime and Prototype battled the hero, but they overcame the misunderstanding, listening the story of the visitor. In the crossover with the Avengers, Prime battled Thor. He also met the Hulk and Captain America. Kevin was lost in the Marvel Universe and befriended Spider-Man. He transformed briefly in a spider-theme Prime called Spider-Prime. Prime had his last solo fight against Lord Pumpkin in Brazil. Afterwards, he joined Ultraforce in the final assault against Demonseed.

A Spider-Prime version of the character was seen in the Spider-Verse event.

== Powers and abilities ==
Kevin transforms into Prime by projecting an organic "liquid flesh" material from his torso. The liquid flesh then shapes itself into a tall man with exceptionally large and defined muscular development. Prime can revert to his teenage form by destabilizing the outer body into a mess of protein goo, either consciously or when his Prime-body's energy reserves run out. When this happens, Kevin must pull himself out of the body's remains or risk suffocating.

As Prime, Kevin possesses tremendous strength with unknown limits, once lifting an entire outdoor gym with relative ease. His resistance to physical injury is also exceptionally high, having survived a close proximity explosion of several nuclear warheads. Prime can also fly at mach-level of velocity. Although all of Prime's powers are modeled after traditional superhero powers, these limitations are defined mostly by Kevin's subconscious aspirations.

In fact, it is frequently suggested that the appearance of the Prime-body is formed mostly by Kevin's subconscious. Many of the features of the Prime-body are taken from Kevin's role models such as action stars and comic book superheroes. Another Ultraverse character who shares a similar origin, Elven, is a fan of Elfquest comics and creates a body for herself that is a mishmash of various Tolkienesque fantasy elements. The face of Prime also bears a striking resemblance to Kevin's own father, Russell Green.

In effect the Prime-body reflects Kevin's own attitudes towards heroism at any given moment. As such, Prime's physical appearance has changed numerous times. Common elements exist among the different Prime-bodies though, such as a stylized 'P' resting somewhere on his chest or cape and some metallic adornment such as chains or gauntlets. Some of his forms include:

- First Prime - a Prime-body obviously inspired by comic book superheroes, as well as local bodybuilders from Kevin's home state. As the first Prime-body, it defines the visual template for the other Prime-bodies. The body possesses extremely developed muscles and prominent veins. The costume is made up of a large red cape, red pants, gold gauntlets, calfguards and chestplate and features the trademark stylized 'P' on both the cape and the chestplate.
- Space Prime - a Prime-body meant to withstand to harsh conditions of outer space. This design was force fed into Kevin's subconscious by military scientists working for Colonel Samuels. The epidermal layer has been transformed into a hardened shell resembling some kind of metallic alloy, designed to prevent the body from expanding in the vacuum of space. A set of air-tanks exist in the subdermal layer. The gold gauntlets, calfguard and chestplate remain as well as the 'P' insignia on his chest, but the cape is absent (in the Ultraforce cartoon, it was Contrary who suggested to him changing form).
- Rogue Prime - a Prime-body inspired by rugged individualistic heroes such as the gun-toting antihero Firearm. The body also sports a series of gold chains around the waist, and a set of spiked armbands and headgear. Tattoos and piercings are also notable, as well as a scar on the right eye. The color scheme is radically different, with the 'P' insignia being black on gold, and the vest being dark blue rather than gold and leather gloves replace the gauntlets. In the Ultraforce animated series, Rogue Prime is created when Kevin falls under mind control, as well as from his inner doubts.
- Final Prime - a Prime-body that reconciles the values of Rogue Prime with the inspirations of the First Prime. The visual appearance is closer to that of the First Prime than the Rogue Prime - cape, gauntlets and all but sections of the cape and pants mix blue and red. Hints of the Rogue Prime exist in the form of tattoos, albeit much fewer in number than in the Rogue Prime. There is a slight amount of arm-hair, also a residual element from the Rogue Prime.
- Spider-Prime - a Prime-body inspired in part by Spider-Man. When Kevin was trapped in the Marvel Universe, he only had half of his power. When he tried to become "primed up", he became a mass of slime and unable to control himself. When he tried to help Spider-Man fight the Lizard, he changed into Spider-Prime. This form was a smaller version of Prime with a face mask and gave him six arms. Kevin transformed twice more into a variant version of Spider-Prime, but this body he claimed was 'not Spider-Man's anymore', indicating that somehow the first Spider-Prime may have been a direct imprint on Spider-Man. The second Spider-Prime, like the first, had a red and blue color-scheme much like Spider-Man, along with a mask with red around the eyes, but it also included gauntlets and a massive golden spider on the chest, along with boots to match the gauntlets. The second Spider-Prime had no extra arms except for a singular use in battle with the primary Prime body, which was one-use only. Both of the second Spider-Prime transformations enabled Kevin to use webbing.

== Supporting cast, allies and enemies ==
- Kelly Cantrell is one of Kevin's classmates with a self-proclaimed irrational crush on Prime. She babysits Gus and Evie Blake who are the children of Mantra. Prime has frequently saved Kelly's life and once declared her as his girlfriend. The apparent age difference between Kelly and a hero who appears to be thirty years old makes this problematic.
- Russell Green is Kevin's father and a former military officer who worked directly under Colonel Samuels. He resigned his commission to become an engineer. When he and his wife had trouble conceiving, he volunteered to become a part of Samuels' fertility research program. When he discovered Kevin's identity as Prime, he contacted Samuels, but later went on to pursue an undercover crusade against the military branch that Samuels worked for.
- Colonel Samuels is an ambitious military officer, Colonel Samuels was directly responsible for many dirty secrets in the military. Chief among them was the fertility research program headed by Doc Gross that created Prime, as well as Elven. Samuels attempted to use a combination of blackmail and media manipulation to coerce Kevin/Prime into using his powers to further his own ends. When Prime attempted to blow the cover on his black ops, Samuels committed suicide.
- Doc Gross is the head researcher of the fertility research program that created Prime. Due to unethical nature of his research, Gross had to destroy much of his files and research notes when a government crackdown was imminent. He attempted to capture Prime for further experimentation but this encounter nearly resulted in his death. A mysterious treatment 'vat' gave him a similar superbody but requires several treatments to remain stable. His current agenda is to breed new ultrahumans like Prime.
- Primevil is a reanimated discarded Prime body, this nearly mindless creature encountered Prime once, attempting to absorb him and take his power.

== Possibility of revival ==
In 2003, Steve Englehart was commissioned by Marvel to relaunch the Ultraverse with the most recognizable characters, including Prime, but the project was cancelled. In June 2005, when asked by Newsarama whether Marvel had any plans to revive the Ultraverse, Marvel editor-in-chief Joe Quesada replied:

Let's just say that I wanted to bring these characters back in a very big way, but the way that the deal was initially structured, it's next to impossible to go back and publish these books. There are rumors out there that it has to do with a certain percentage of sales that has to be doled out to the creative teams. While this is a logistical nightmare because of the way the initial deal was structured, it's not the reason why we have chosen not to go near these characters, there is a bigger one, but I really don't feel like it's my place to make that dirty laundry public.

== Appearances in other media ==
Prime was a recurring character in the short-lived Ultraforce animated series, where Hardcase acts as his mentor (as he is the only one in the team who knows that Prime is a teenager), and he constantly bickers with Prototype, usually insulting him because his lack of super powers. Prime's team faces off with other Ultraverse villains such as Rune and Lord Pumpkin. Prime is voiced by Michael Donovan, and Prime's alter ego, Kevin Green, is voiced by Amos Crawley.

Prime was one of the action figures produced for Galoob's Ultraforce line.

Prime also starred in a Sega CD disc published by Sony Imagesoft bundled with Psygnosis' Microcosm video game. Though marketed as a video game, Ultraverse Prime is actually a multimedia CD which includes digital copies of 12 issues of the Prime comic book, video interviews with Prime's creators, some concept art, and a beat 'em up game. The disc received a negative review from GamePro.

A pastiche of Prime was included among the army of Supermen in Final Crisis #7.

In October 2002, Marvel Studios announced a film deals for Sub-Mariner and Prime with Universal Studios while Universal had the Hulk film in post-production with a then-expected June 6 release date. In 2003 Marvel's earning report wrote that its status was "to be determined". No progress was made with the adaptation of Prime and is presumably canceled.
