= Ultraforce =

Comic book superhero group

Publication information
- Publisher: Malibu Comics; Marvel Comics
- First appearance: Pre-Black September: Ultraforce #1 (August 1994); Post-Black September: Ultraforce vol. 2 #∞ (October 1995)
- Created by: Gerard Jones; George Pérez

In-story information
- Base(s): Pre-Black September: Ultraforce HQ, Florida; Post-Black September: Ultraforce HQ, Headless Cross, Arkansas
- Member(s): See roster

The Ultraforce is a fictional superhero group that appears in American comic books published by Malibu, and later Marvel. The purpose of the group was to protect the public and keep other "Ultras" (superheroes) from becoming unruly.

The group consists of various Ultras in Malibu's Ultraverse, including the super-strong Prime; Hardcase, one of the first public Ultras and the most famous; Prototype, Ultra-Tech's armored spokesperson; Topaz, warrior queen of Gwendor; the undead Ghoul, the last surviving member of the Exiles; and the mysterious Contrary, who organized the team and provided their technology.

In 1995, Ultraforce was adapted into an animated television series that ran for 13 episodes. The series was produced by DIC Entertainment.

== Publication history ==
The team debuted in Ultraforce #1 (August 1994). In a similar fashion to the Avengers and Justice League, Ultraforce was an assemblage of ultras (superheroes) who each had an existing series of their own. The first Ultraforce series ran for 11 issues, from #0–10. The first 7 issues were written by Gerard Jones and drawn by George Pérez.

After the purchase of Malibu Comics by Marvel, Ultraforce began a crossover with the Avengers in the "Black September" event with Avengers/Ultraforce. After the event, the Ultraforce book was reformed and ran for 16 issues (September 1995–December 1996), from issue ∞ to issue 15. A one-shot (Ultraverse Future Shock #1) was published in February 1997 to wrap up unresolved plot lines. The Ultra's team were also depicted in a multitude of events such as Black September, Phoenix Resurrection, Ultraforce/Spider-Man, and Ultraverse Unlimited.

Marvel ended the Ultraverse line in 1997.

== Fictional biography ==
=== Formation of the team ===
The only survivor of the Exiles, Ghoul, raised himself from his tomb and was harassed by the press and the public. The Ultra Hardcase rescued him and suggested to the press that only the Ultras could regulate other Ultras, not the government. Prime saw the interview on TV and decided to search for members of a new team to be called "Ultraforce". He convinced Prototype of the necessity of the team, but begin to fight him for the "leadership". The fight between the two young ultras alerted Contrary, who brought Hardcase and Ghoul to her airship and show them the impact that the fight was having on the general public. When Prime and Prototype were fighting in the land, the villain named Atalon, king of the fire people, brought them underground. Hardcase went to rescue them. Meanwhile, one of the three queens of Gwendor, Topaz, arrived on Earth from the Godwheel. Contrary promised her to return to her people. Prime and Prototype tried to fight Atalon but were defeated by him. Hardcase arrives just in time save them. After this, the team was formed and backed by the US government and president Bill Clinton. The members tried to recruit aid from the Freex, The Strangers, the Night Man, and Mantra, but were rejected. After manipulations of Contrary, Prime left the team temporarily. Attalon raised a new island and fought Ultraforce in the surface. In the fight, Prime returned and Atalon detonated a nuclear missile in the isle.

In the battle with Attalon, the young ultra Pixx sacrificed herself to disable the nuclear arsenal of the villain and was killed by the increasing radiation. In the end, Attalon was defeated and after a negotiation with Contrary, he left the surface world to its own devices. In the next months, the Ultra Ghoul investigated the strange death of the singer Mosh.

=== Black September ===
Marvel's superhero Black Knight arrived in the Ultraverse and met with Prototype and Prime. He participated in the battle against some 'angels' created by Metabio Corporation and that was freed accidentally by the ultra Siren, who joined the team too. The 'angels' did not have an effect on Ghoul, because he had a decaying body, so he could defeat them. Topaz fought the sorceress Mantra for the possession of the sword of Fangs that used to belong to Topaz's people, but were interrupted by the villain Hybrid who sent Ultraforce in a quest in Egypt. Hybrid was killed and Topaz and Mantra make peace Later, when Black Knight was searching for clues about Loki's presence in New York, he found his lover Sersi, but she was possessed by the Ego Infinity gem and attacked him and Topaz.

Then, the Ultraforce battled the Asgardian god named Loki that was searching for the infinity gems in the Ultraverse. Loki sends the heroes in different directions with illusions. They found the infinity gems and with the help of Sersi, returned to Earth. After this, the Ultraforce heroes were fooled by Loki in fighting the Avengers in a competition between Loki and the Grandmaster for the infinity gems. Loki won the competition and received all the gems, but he soon lost the gems to the entity Nemesis when the seven gems reunited. Both teams (Avengers and Ultraforce) fought Nemesis in an altered reality that combined both universes. The slaying of Nemesis by the Black Knight caused a reality-changed event that transformed the Ultraverse, erasing Hardcase and Contrary from existence and from the memories of their former teammates, and replacing Prototype (Jimmy Ruiz) with his predecessor in the Prototype armor, Bob Campbell.

=== After Black September ===
After the event known as "Black September" (when Marvel Comics purchased Malibu), the Ultraforce was re-created as a new team. Marvel's Black Knight became the leader of the new group, which consisted of him, Prototype (Bob Campbell), Prime, Topaz, and Ghoul. The new team fought the fanatics of the Fold that worshiped a man called Pascal and were murdering ultras, but they soon found that Pascal was dead and that the Fold was using him to enforce their beliefs. The team was given a new base by the U.S. government in Headless Cross, Arkansas. A mysterious man called Cromwell was introduced as a government liaison for the team, and the wife of Bob Campbell, Felicia Campbell, supported the team as a medic. In the next months, new members arrived in the team included the mysterious Lament and the vigilante Wreckage, who apparently had committed various murders that were investigated by Ultraforce. They discovered that the murders were committed by the ultra Bonehammer, who was employed by a criminal organization, the commission. With the help of Wreckage, the Ultraforce defeated Bonehammer.

The team-up with the X-Men occurred when the Phoenix Force arrived in the Ultraverse and possessed Prime. Both teams drove the Phoenix away, but it found a new host: Amber Hunt. They also team up with Spider-Man against the extraterrestrials The Shifters who attempted to provoke a war between the Ultraverse and Earth 616. Afterwards, Amber Hunt and Ghoul investigated the Exiles' graves and found the Progeny, an alien menace from the future. In an investigation about the ultra Foxfire, Ultraforce met Timothy Halloran, the Mastodon, who was committing murders in the sewers of New York. Mastodon was taken to medical care. Foxfire was an unknown carrier of the Progeny virus.

The Ultraforce investigated the murder of Senator Robert Shrine, which involved ultras who were killed too. In the quest, they fought the Rawborgs and Dog. After the murderous attack of some of his teammates against Dog, the Black Knight expelled Topaz, Ghoul, Lament and Wreckage from the team. Topaz did not want to leave and confronted the Knight. She, Lament and Prime were acting very aggressively and attacked the Knight and Cromwell. It was revealed that Prime, Lament, and Topaz were infected by the Progeny virus and fought his counterparts from 50 years in the future that came to cure them. The Progeny virus would have infected all the Ultras in Earth. After they cured the virus and took Foxfire with them, the Ultraforce from the future erased the memory of this event from their counterparts of the past. Searching in the base about what happened, the Black Knight and Topaz released Specimen 13, one of several beings being kept in the secret basement and who was also Cromwell's brother. The specimen overpowered the heroes but was convinced by his brother to return to his chamber.

After this, the Ultraforce joined the New Exiles, who were fighting an alien robot called Maxis. The Ultraforce collapsed a building upon Maxis, stopping him temporarily. Immediately afterward, an entire armada of the Tulkan aliens arrived at the scene. They said that they were tracking a monster called Demonseed who was causing various damage to their worlds. The Tulkan had tracked the monster to Earth and wanted revenge. The Ultraforce and the New Exiles fought the elite of the armada, defeating them after a brutal battle. With problems in their ships, the Tulkan leader accepted defeat and fled. In the aftermath of the invasion, and with the help of Maxis, the Black Knight returned to his home dimension with the exiles Siena Blaze and Reaper via an interdimensional portal.

Prototype (Bob Campbell) becomes the new leader and accepted new members from the Exiles: Hellblade, Ripfire, Amber Hunt, Iron Clad, and the robot Maxis, who was now deprived of his original mission. When Ghoul arrived at the scene, he was accepted back into the team as well. Back at their base, the Ultraforce met Hardcase, but did not recognize him. Hardcase explained to them he was not erased by the Black September, but was shunted instead into a limbo, where he created the creature Demonseed as a companion in the loneliness. Demonseed, however, rebelled against his creator and escaped to the past via a portal, where he destroyed innumerable alien civilizations. Demonseed finally appeared and fought the Ultraforce, overpowering them, Ripfire was killed in the last attacks of the creature, but Hardcase sacrificed himself to send Demonseed back to the limbo, where he fought it for all eternity. Despite the grave losses, the Ultraforce looked into the future to continue its mission.

50 years into the future, Prime, Iron Clad, and others were enjoying themselves after various battles.

== Members ==
The names listed are those used while the character was associated with Ultraforce. "First appearance" is the place where the character first appeared in the Ultraverse. It is not necessarily the first appearance of the character in print, nor the story depicting how the character joined the team. All information is listed in publication order first, then alphabetical.

=== Pre-Black September ===
Character	Real name	First appearance	Notes
Contrary	Unknown	Freex #9	Allegedly was "Wetware Mary". Founder of the Ultra school Academy of the New Elite.
Ghoul	Jonathan Martin	Exiles #1	Only survivor of the ultra team Exiles.
Hardcase	Tom Hawke	Hardcase #1	Actor and old member of the First ultra team The Squad.
Pixx	Penny Burka	Giant-Size Freex #1	Student recruited by Contrary.
Prime	Kevin Green	Prime #1	Strongest ultra.
Prototype	Jimmy Ruiz	Prototype #1	Second bearer of the Prototype armor.
Topaz	N/A	Giant-Size Mantra #1	Alien queen from the Female-only Gwendor realm.
Black Knight	Dane Whitman	Ultraforce #8 (in Ultraverse)	Hero from Marvel Universe.
Siren	Jennifer Pearson	Eliminator #1	Former thief.

=== Post-Black September ===
Character	Real name	First appearance	Notes
Black Knight	Dane Whitman		
Ghoul	Jonathan Martin		
Prime	Kevin Green		
Prototype	Bob Campbell	Prototype #0	First bearer of the Prototype armor. The adventures of Jimmy Ruiz were retconned as his own.
Topaz	N/A		
Cromwell	Unknown	Ultraforce vol. 2 #1	Government liaison of the team.
Felicia Campbell		Prototype #0	Support doctor.
Lament	Sarah Walks Unseen	Ultraforce vol. 2 #1	
Wreckage	Jack Prosper	Ultraforce Vol. 2 #1	
Amber Hunt	N/A	Exiles #1	
Hellblade	Jefferson Kotto	Prime #26	
Iron Clad	Spencer Collins	Ultraverse Premiere #5	Resurrected by the Maxis Robot.
Maxis	Dar'u Sorrin	All New Exiles #8	Alien robot.
Ripfire	Chi'arr / Matt McKinney	Ultraverse Premiere #1	Alien warrior with an emmiety with Demonseed.
Hardcase	Tom Hawke		Returned from limbo.

=== Fictional history ===
==== Hardcase ====
Hardcase is a superhero who debuted in the comic book series of the same name, written by James Hudnall for Malibu Comics' Ultraverse imprint, one of the first series to launch the imprint. Hardcase was Tom Hawke, a Hollywood actor who became one of the first publicly known Ultras (the blanket term for superhumans in the Ultraverse) formed the first superhero team in his universe, The Squad.

Hardcase made his first appearance in Hardcase #1, dated June 1993, written by James Hudnall and illustrated by Jim Callahan.

As part of the Ultraverse imprint, the comic was set within a shared universe of super-powered beings conceptualized by creators of Malibu Comics. Image Comics, a line of creator-owned comics some of which made record-breaking sales figures, had a publishing deal with Malibu that had ended shortly before. The book lasted 26 issues and included a Hardcase Premiere edition published in July 1993. Hardcase also appeared in other books, and crossovers like Break-thru, Godwheel and Black September. He was included in the first volume of the Ultraforce team book as part of the lineup. After the Black September event, Hardcase was apparently removed from existence, but he returned in Ultraforce Vol. 2 #13 and took part of the final arc of the book.

Incredibly strong, Hardcase is able to throw a car over 50 yards with little effort. His leg muscles allow him to leap nearly a mile. Nearly invulnerable to damage and changes in temperature, only extreme temperatures affect him. When he is hurt, Hardcase can heal quickly, though the process is sped up if he drinks seawater. His senses are enhanced, allowing him to hear and see over long distances.

==== Prototype ====
Prototype is the name of two fictitious superheroes of the Ultraverse line of comics. Both characters used an advanced exo-armor developed by the Ultratech corporation and were employees of that company. The original Prototype was Bob Campbell, who was replaced after an accident by a young man named Jimmy Ruiz.

Bob Campbell served as the first spokesperson for the Ultratech corporation. He used the Prototype armor developed by the company but he was injured in a demonstration and lost an arm after fighting the villain Arena.

After the accident, the young man Jimmy Ruiz was contracted by Ultratech to serve as the new spokesperson. He was given steroids and was surgically implanted with special cybernetics to allow him to control a new Prototype armor. In his first appearance at a shareholders' meeting, Jimmy was attacked by a supervillain. The fight ended with the killing of the villain.

Jimmy with Bob, after uncovering Ultra-Tech's corruption, opted to overthrow the company and become independent heroes, fighting the Japanese organization, Techuza.

When Marvel relaunched the Ultraverse, in the "Black September" event, Jimmy Ruiz was erased out of existence and Bob Campbell was the only Prototype that had existed (his arm had never been torn off, either). He became part of the new Ultraforce and after a time, his leader. He led the Ultraforce heroes against the villain, Demonseed.

==== Contrary ====
Contrary is a mysterious woman who discovered the technology of the ancient Fire People, building a secret academy for young ultras and a special airship with transportation abilities. She was alleged Wetware Mary, a nurse who exposed various infant children to a wetware virus, transforming them into Ultras in their puberty. Years later, Contrary tracked down several of these children for her Academy of the New Elite and was opposed by the runaways teens called Freex. When Ultraforce was formed, Contrary united the various members and convinced Hardcase to be the leader. She expressed interest in the adventures of the Black Knight, when he arrived in the Ultraverse, from Earth-616.

When Marvel relaunched the Ultraverse, in the "Black September" event, Contrary was erased from existence, and her whereabouts are unknown

==== Topaz ====
Topaz is a character created by Mike W. Barr, appearing first in Giant-Size Mantra #1. She was a warrior Queen from the extra-dimensional matriarchal realm of Gwendor, located in the Godwheel. Topaz was the title of the queen, and her real name was never revealed. She meets the sorceress Mantra, when she arrived in her kingdom. She fought the sorceress for the possession of the old Gwendor's Claw, an ancient relic.

A crashed alien spacecraft created a series of random pan-dimensional gateways, briefly connecting Gwendor to the Ultraverse. Queen Topaz was stranded in a strange world, one in which males were not separate from women like Gwendor. Topaz was outraged by the new reality, but Pixx of the Ultraforce calmed her by showing her an image of the "true power behind men". Pixx explained that Earth males have fragile egos and that it was easier for women to let males think they were in charge. Topaz, still disturbed by what she considered an unnatural order, consented to join UltraForce, even though it was led by a man, Hardcase.

After the Black Knight arrived in the Ultraverse, Topaz begin to discuss with him his mandates. When Sersi arrived at the encounter of the Knight, apparently mad, Topaz begins a battle with the Eternal, until Sersi was calmed. After Black September, Topaz remained in the Ultraverse and got used to it. There were hints of mutual attraction between her and Black Knight, that went nowhere. Topaz was in the front in the battle against the Tulkans and Demonseed.

==== Ghoul ====
Ghoul (real name Jonathan Martin) is a character created by Steve Gerber, R.R. Phipps, Dave Olbrich, Chris Ulm, and Tom Mason, appearing first in Exiles Vol. 1 #1.

Jonathan Martin was one of the young people affected by the Theta Virus, which provided superhuman powers but also killed its host without assistance. He became a zombie-like being, neither truly alive nor dead. He was recruited in the Exiles by Dr. Rachel Deming, who united a group of Theta Virus victims with superpowers. The entire group was killed (after various mistakes) by an explosion caused by Amber Hunt. Before his "death", Ghoul killed the villain Malcolm Kord and his minions. Ghoul survived, being buried for a while, and rose from his grave with an altered appearance, meeting Hardcase and became a member of the Ultraforce.

==== Pixx ====
Pixx (Penny Burka) is a character created by Gerard Jones and Jeff Parker. Her first appearance was in Giant Size Freex #1 (1995). Penny was a normal teen until her powers surfaced, causing her to uncontrollably project hallucinatory images to those around her. Her parents contacted the Academy of the New Elite, managed by Contrary. Under her tutelage, Pixx discovered that her powers also extended to enormous technical prowess. She was part of the original lineup of Ultraforce, but she sacrificed herself in the battle against Attalon.

== Enemies ==
Pre-Black September

- Attalon
- Angels created by Metabio corporation
- Hybrid
- Loki
- Nemesis

Post-Black September

- The Fold and Pascal
- Bonehammer
- Phoenix Force
- Shifters
- The Progeny
- Rawborgs and Dog
- Specimen 13
- Maxis
- Tulkan armada and his Elite
- Demonseed
- Rune

== Possibility of revival ==
In 2003, Steve Englehart was commissioned by Marvel to relaunch the Ultraverse with the most recognizable characters, including Hardcase and Prime, but the editorial decided not to resurrect the imprint. In June 2005, when asked by Newsarama whether Marvel had any plans to revive the Ultraverse, Marvel editor-in-chief Joe Quesada replied:

Let's just say that I wanted to bring these characters back in a very big way, but the way that the deal was initially structured, it's next to impossible to go back and publish these books.

There are rumors out there that it has to do with a certain percentage of sales that has to be doled out to the creative teams. While this is a logistical nightmare because of the way the initial deal was structured, it's not the reason why we have chosen not to go near these characters, there is a bigger one, but I really don't feel like it's my place to make that dirty laundry public.

When Simon Spurrier, writer of the 2021 Black Knight series, was asked if the series was going to take place in the Ultraverse, he said: "None percent, I'm afraid".

== Animated series ==
Ultraforce
- Genre: Superhero; Action; Adventure; Science fiction
- Developed by: Martha Moran (episodes 1–9); Robert N. Skir and Marty Isenberg (episodes 10–13)
- Voices of: Andrew Jackson
- Countries of origin: Canada; United States
- Original language: English
- No. of episodes: 13

Production
- Executive producers: Andy Heyward; Michael Maliani
- Producer: Scott Mitchell Rosenberg
- Running time: 22 minutes
- Production companies: DIC Productions, L.P. Bohbot Entertainment

Original release
- Network: USA Network
- Release: October 15 – December 31, 1995

There was a short-lived Ultraforce animated television series that ran for 13 episodes. It was based on the first version of the Ultraforce comic book, and was produced by DIC Entertainment and Bohbot Entertainment. There was also an Ultraforce action figure line produced by Galoob. The cartoon featured the roster of Prime, Hardcase, Prototype, Topaz, Ghoul, Contrary and Pixx. It also included appearances of the Night Man and the Strangers.

The series will be released on Blu-ray from Discotek Media.

=== Episode list ===
No.	Title	Written by	Original release date	Prod. code
1	"Prime Time (Part 1)"	Martha Moran	15 October 1995	1
Part one of the series pilot. The return of the creature NM-E at a missile base ends up bringing together Ultra heroes Hardcase, Prime and Prototype together, but unbeknownst to them, NM-E is working for someone else.
2	"The Stuff of Heroes (Part 2)"	Eric Luke	22 October 1995	2
Part two of the pilot. With the missiles under his control, Atalon begins his attack on the surface world. The heroes must work together to stop him. Meanwhile, the alien warrior queen Topaz arrives on Earth.
3	"Armageddon (Part 3)"	Martha Moran	29 October 1995	3
Conclusion to the pilot. The battle between Ultraforce and Atalon reaches its climax as Atalon launches at attack on the surface world, but one member won't be coming back.
4	"Lord Pumpkin's Pie (Part 1)"	Dennis O'Flaherty	5 November 1995	4
Prototype, tired of fighting Ultratech, takes some time off to return home. He finds his childhood friends consuming a drug called "zuke". He meets the local crime lord, Marcello, and his old flame, Rita. Marcello has a proposition for Prototype and Rita has plans of her own.
5	"You Can't Go Home Again (Part 2)"	Dennis O'Flaherty	12 November 1995	5
Prototype continues his dealings with a new crime lord, the supernatural being known as Lord Pumpkin. He becomes involved in a drug war between Lord Pumpkin and Marcello.
6	"Wrack & Ruin"	Douglas Booth	19 November 1995	6
Prime is taken into custody by the government organization named Aladdin, when he is believed to be infected with a strain of rogue DNA, but there is more to this story than it seems.
7	"Night and The Nightman"	Richard Mueller	19 November 1995	7
An accident leaves jazz saxophonist Johnny Domino with the telepathic ability to hear evil thoughts. Johnny soon discovers that something else was created in the accident and a new hero is born to battle it.
8	"Prime Ambition"	Bob Forward	26 November 1995	8
Prime decides to learn the origin of his powers after stopping a bank robbery committed by two children with powers similar to his own. He soon finds the true origins of his power.
9	"A Veiled Threat"	Diane M. Fresco	3 December 1995	9
Hardcase's new co-star may be hiding a secret, and Ultraforce's members Topaz and Ghoul decide to investigate.
10	"Pump It Up!"	Len Wein (story); Robert N. Skir and Marty Isenberg (story/teleplay)	10 December 1995	10
Lord Pumpkin returns as the manager of a young Ultra rock star, whose music places teenagers under mind control. Prime also falls under his influence.
11	"Primal Scream"	Marty Isenberg and Robert N. Skir	17 December 1995	11
Kevin begins having trouble controlling his more bestial side, Prime. The vampiric Rune observes and prepares to attack.
12	"Everything That Rises Must Converge (Part 1)"	Robert N. Skir and Marty Isenberg	24 December 1995	12
A new team known as "The Strangers" is formed when the passengers of a cable car are struck by lightning and acquire Ultra abilities. Meanwhile, on the moon, a villain called Boneyard has arrived.
13	"Jumpin at the Boneyard (Part 2)"	Robert N. Skir and Marty Isenberg	31 December 1995	13
Boneyard finds a source of power on the moon and Ultraforce must stop him.

=== Voice cast ===
Philip Akin as Hector	Amos Crawley as Squidge, Pork	Janet-Laine Green as Contrary
Rick Bennett as Sludge	Murray Cruchley as Newscaster	Katie Griffin as Kelly Cantrell
Robert Bockstael as Russell Green, Lt. Jameson	Diane D'Aquila as Jimmy's Mom	Graham Haley as Luther Silk
Sally Cahill as Rita	Catherine Disher as Topaz	Tom Harvey as General Samuels
Patrick Chilvers as D.J. Blast	Shirley Douglas as Nurse	Dan Hennessey as General Rayder
Jesse Collins as Nightman	Michael Fletcher as Lord Pumpkin	David Hewlett as Spectral
Alyson Court as Pixx	David Fox as King Abazel	Andrew Jackson as Ultra Squidge
Eve Crawford as Ruth Green	Tamara Gorski as Electrocute	Maurice Dean Wint as Rune
David Keeley as Atom Bob	Susan Roman as Dawn Parker	Bruce Tubbe as Duey
Lorne Kennedy as Atalon, Boneyard	Rino Romano as Prototype	Marlow Vella as Eric Montrose
Shannon Lawson as Whitney Richards	Camilla Scott as Chrysalis	Johnny White as Kevin Green
Kristina Nicoll as Gazma	Chuck Shamata as Roger Tremayne	Chris Wiggins as Dr. Gross
Jeff Max Nicholls as Marcello	Norm Spencer as Grenade	Peter Wildman as Ghoul
Nicole Oliver as Veil	John Stocker as Stanley Leland	Rod Wilson as Hardcase
Max Piersig as Prime	Stuart Stone as Pistol	Jaimz Woolvett as Head Knocker
Toby Proctor as Mosh	Sunny Besen Thrasher as Ultra Pork	Richard Yearwood as Zip-Zap

=== Reception ===
The TV show had a poor reception from critics.

== In other media ==
- The Ultraforce member Prime starred in a Sega CD disc published by Sony Imagesoft bundled with Psygnosis' Microcosm video game. Though marketed as a video game, Ultraverse Prime is actually a multimedia CD which includes digital copies of 12 issues of the Prime comic book, video interviews with Prime's creators, some concept art, and a beat 'em up game. The disc received a negative review from GamePro.
- The Ultraforce character Topaz (created by Mike W. Barr) was portrayed by Rachel House, in the film Thor: Ragnarok (2017) and the short film Team Darryl, as part of the Marvel Cinematic Universe, produced by Marvel Studios.
