= Mantra (comics) =

- Art by Tom Grummett

Publication information
- Publisher: Malibu Comics
- First appearance: Mantra #1 (July 1993)
- Created by: Mike W. Barr

In-story information
- Alter ego: Lukasz/Eden Blake
- Team affiliations: Twelve Knights of Archimage; Aladdin
- Abilities: Mystical ability

Mantra II

Publication information
- Publisher: Malibu Comics
- First appearance: Mantra Vol. 1 #14 (as Lauren); Mantra Vol. 2 #∞ (infinity) (as the new Mantra)
- Created by: Mike W. Barr

In-story information
- Alter ego: Lauren Sherwood
- Abilities: Mystical ability

Mantra is an American comic book series written by Mike W. Barr, mainly penciled by Terry Dodson and published by Malibu Comics in the mid-1990s, until it was purchased by Marvel Comics. Adam Hughes is credited for the character designs. After the purchase, the title was canceled after 24 issues and revamped in a new version, with a new protagonist.

Mantra is the name of the lead character, an Ultra (superhero) within Malibu's Ultraverse line of comics.

== Publication history ==
Mantra made his first appearance in Mantra #1, dated July 1993, written by Mike W. Barr and illustrated by Terry Dodson.

As part of the Ultraverse imprint, the comic was set within a shared universe of super-powered beings conceptualized by writers and artists of Malibu comics. The first volume lasted 24 issues, with a Giant Sized issue. Mantra was also depicted in the Mantra: Spear of Destiny miniseries published in April 1995, that lasted two issues. Mantra appeared in other Ultraverse books, and crossovers like Break-thru, Godwheel and Black September. After the Black September event, the title of Mantra passed to a new character in Mantra issue # ∞. The new protagonist was depicted in Mantra vol. 2 for 7 issues until the series was canceled by low sales.

== Fictional history ==
=== From warrior to sorceress ===
An eternal warrior named Lukasz and 11 compatriots had been fighting the villain Boneyard for centuries: whenever an individual soldier dies, his soul would be magically placed in a new body to take up the fight once more. In the 1990s, Lukasz' leader Archimage was betrayed by one of his men and captured by Boneyard, leading to the permanent death of most of the warriors and a final reincarnation for others. To the shock of Lukasz, he was put into the body of a woman, Eden Blake.

In addition to being forced to deal with a new life as a woman, Lukasz also faces the particular challenges of Eden's life — in particular, her two children and her ex-husband. He falls in love with the soul of Eden Blake, which still exists within him. He also discovers that Eden had vast latent powers, including a mystical armor activated by a specific invocation including the word 'mantra', leading to the media dubbing her as such.

In his last battle with Boneyard's men, commanded by Notch, the last male body of Lukasz was killed by a mercenary with precognitive abilities called Warstrike, who was deceived by the soldiers of Boneyard into attacking Archimage's warriors. While Lukazs is adapting to the body and family of Eden Blake, Warstrike found the Blake's house and told Lukasz-Eden that he had discovered the fraud of Boneyard's men. Lukasz-Eden convinces Warstrike to help him in the battle against Boneyard. Later, Lukasz recovers a magical mask that is being sold in an auction. With this mask, Lukasz becomes Mantra and, through the use of magic, defeats the soldiers of Boneyard that had attacked during the auction. Lukasz-Mantra knew that someone close to Archimage betrayed him. He suspected the lawyer that worked with Archimage, John Dalmas. Mantra fools Dalmas into leaving his office and begins to search for evidence, but he is attacked by a magical construct called Kismet Deadly, created by Archimage with the intention of testing him. Mantra defeats Kismet, and later found two of his old companions, Hamath and Yaron, reincarnated as an old man and a dog respectively. Kismet Deadly appears to the trio and kills Hamath and Yaron. Confronted with the nature of mortality, Kismet leaves. After the battle, Mantra is captured by Boneyard, who takes the sorceress to his kingdom in the Godwheel.

Boneyard tries to force Mantra to become his fourth wife, but she escapes with help of Warstrike and the local resistance. Sometime later, Mantra fights a demon vassal of Boneyard that had adopted the form of a wolf cartoon character. Mantra and the demon fight in a cartoon-like reality, and the demon is banished to Boneyard's realm. Mantra later joins the government agency Aladdin.

=== Break-Thru ===
During the Break-Thru event, Mantra helps other heroes in fighting the minions of the villain Rex Mundi while protecting Amber Hunt. Lukazs-Mantra arrives on the moon possessing magic and for the first time, when he was shown various illusions created by the Entity of the Moon, Mantra is confronted by the fact that for 1500 years she has been destroying families by stealing men's bodies and forcing them to walk away from their lives. Mantra joins other heroes that have arrived on the moon and discovers that The Entity of the Moon is the origin of the existence of Ultras on Earth. On the moon, Mantra also encounters Prime who is romantically attracted to her.

Back on Earth, Lukasz-Mantra is captured by Dr. Gross, an enemy of Prime, and has to be rescued by a young Ultra. He later helps the Aladdin agent Wrath in the fight against an alien hunter. When Mantra appears as a metallic knight in the wedding of one of Eden Blake's friends, he discovers that his friend Thanasi was the one who betrayed Archimage and his warriors.

Later, Boneyard tricks Mantra into killing Archimage. Mantra arrives in Godwheel, where he meets Topaz, one of the three Queens of Gwendor (a female-only country). Mantra has to fight Topaz in a ceremonial battle for possession of the Sword of Fangs, the blade that Mantra is using and that formerly belonged to Gwendor.

=== Godwheel ===
Lukasz is temporarily separated from the body of Eden Blake and transferred to a male body. He, Warstrike, Eden Blake (now back in possession of her body), Boneyard and other heroes and villains were transported to the Godwheel by the god Argus. Argus was searching for minions in his quest for power. The corpse of Eden was taken over by Thanasi, who called himself Necromantra and had joined Argus' side. Lukasz, Warstrike and other heroes are forced to make an alliance with Boneyard to search for certain magical objects. Necromantra creates the creature Primevil with the old carcass of the hero Prime. With the help of the Marvel hero Thor, the Ultraheroes fight Necromantra, Primevil and a Lord Pumpkin-possessed Argus. After the battle Thor and the other heroes return to Earth.

On Earth, Lukazs and Eden are finally together and they conceive a child. The pregnancy of Eden is abnormally short and the child born is revealed to be Necromantra, who proceeds to grow to adult size and fights Lukasz. Later Mantra again meets Primevil, who has gained sapience with the Mind Gem. Primevil was infatuated with Mantra, however the Asgardian god Loki takes advantage of the situation and steals the Mind Gem. When Mantra meets Topaz again on the Ultraforce's ship, the Queen of Gwendor demands the return of the sacred sword of Fangs that Mantra still possesses. They begin to fight and are interrupted by the villain Hybrid. With the help of Ultraforce, Hybrid is defeated.

=== Post-Black September ===
Following the Black September event, the Marvel-led Malibu began publication of a second volume with a new Mantra, removing the magic from Eden/Lukasz and casting it onto a minor character from the first series named Lauren Sherwood, a young blonde woman who was the teenage babysitter of Eden Blake's children. This new version becomes stuck in the Ultraverse. Lukasz-Mantra became a supporting character until issue #5. The new Mantra fought NecroMantra-Thanasi and N.M.E. The second volume lasted only 7 issues.

In her last appearance, Mantra meets Ghoul from Ultraforce, who was working as a taxi driver, and gives him a ring that transforms his appearance, allowing him to work without scaring his fares.

== Powers and abilities ==
Lukasz was an extremely experienced warrior whose master (Archimage) would reincarnate him and eleven other warriors into new bodies each time they fell in combat throughout the centuries. In Eden Blake's body, he could use the latent potential for magic inherited by those of her bloodline; the longer he was in her form, the more he could access this power, slowly becoming a vastly powerful sorceress. She could summon a mystical armor by invoking the word "Mantra". The armor acted as a "focus" for her powers, increasing the abilities greatly. She could also accomplish great things requiring vast power by reciting over and over the mantra given to her by Archimage, "Change, Growth, Power" while the power inside her built.

Lauren Sherwood's abilities were similar, but developed more rapidly.

== Possibility of revival ==
In 2003, Steve Englehart was commissioned by Marvel to relaunch the Ultraverse with the most recognizable characters, including Mantra, but the editorial staff decided not to resurrect the Ultraverse imprint. In June 2005, when asked by Newsarama whether Marvel had any plans to revive the Ultraverse, Marvel editor-in-chief Joe Quesada replied:

Let's just say that I wanted to bring these characters back in a very big way, but the way that the deal was initially structured, it's next to impossible to go back and publish these books.

There are rumors out there that it has to do with a certain percentage of sales that has to be doled out to the creative teams. While this is a logistical nightmare because of the way the initial deal was structured, it's not the reason why we have chosen not to go near these characters, there is a bigger one, but I really don't feel like it's my place to make that dirty laundry public.

== Sources ==
- Misiroglu, Gina (2012). "Ultraverse Heroes". The Superhero Book: The Ultimate Encyclopedia of Comic-Book Icons and Hollywood Heroes. Visible Ink Press. pp. 377–379. ISBN 9781578593972.
- Keith Dallas, Jason Sacks (2018). "1991". American Comic Book Chronicles: The 1990s. TwoMorrows Publishing. pp. 99–100. ISBN 9781605490847.
