= Night Man (character) =

Publication information
- Publisher: Marvel Comics
- First appearance: The Strangers #1 (as Johnny Domino); The Night Man #1 (as Night Man)
- Created by: Steve Englehart; Rick Hoberg

In-story information
- Alter ego: John "Johnny" Domino, né Domingo
- Species: Human mutate
- Team affiliations: Freex
- Abilities: Malicious telepathy; Night vision; Infra-red vision via mask; Sleeplessness; Neural resistance; Use of Celtic Magick; Skilled martial artist and gymnast

Night Man (John "Johnny" Domino) is a superhero created by Steve Englehart and Rick Hoberg, who exists in the Ultraverse line of comics and possesses the super ability to hear the evil thoughts of those people around him. His real name is Johnny Domino, a talented San Francisco saxophonist. He was adapted in a live-action television series from 1997 to 1999.

== Publication history ==
The Night Man appeared as a civilian in The Strangers #1 (June 1993) and became a superhero in Night Man #1 (Oct. 1993), written by Steve Englehart and illustrated by Darick Robertson. As part of the Ultraverse imprint, the comic was set within a shared universe of super-powered beings called the Ultraverse and published by Malibu Comics.

The character was depicted in his own series, that lasted 23 issues from October 1993 to August 1995. After the Black September event, The Night Man was relaunched in a new series that lasted 5 issues, from September to December 1995. He had a crossover with Wolverine in the One shot Night Man Vs Wolverine published in August 1995. Finally the character was depicted in a limited series of three issues called Night Man/Gambit that lasted from March to May 1996, in which the Night Man teamed up with Gambit from Marvel Comics.

== Fictional biography ==
John E. Domingo was a professional saxophone player who took the stage name Johnny Domino. He was living in San Francisco when his Miata car was hit by a runaway cable car. The cable car was struck by strange lightning, called the Jumpstart effect, a burst of energy that gave humans ultra-powers. As a result, John Domingo and all those aboard the cable car were transformed into Ultras. Johnny was seriously injured by the car crash and was in coma for several weeks. The doctors did not believe in his survival because a fragment of shrapnel was embedded in his brain. Johnny however lived and acquired the ability to hear evil thoughts of those people around him. Also, his eyes were permanently dilated, giving him incredible night vision. Finally, his brain has been altered and he had prolonged insomnia. He became a costumed vigilante and called himself the Night Man.

He tried to save a girl who was in danger of murder by one criminal, but he arrived too late. Then Johnny fought an ultra criminal called Mangle who was murdering young boys and was searching for the son of the industrialist I.D. Hunt. When the Night Man tried to help the boy, I.D. Hunt Jr. he discovered that he was a psychopath. When a night of madness descended upon San Francisco, the Night man was looking for Mangle, and met the group of teen ultras called the Freex, who were fooled by Mangle in a quest of revenge from I.D. Hunt. Johnny managed to defeat Mangle with a gun and became an ally of the Freex. Later he fought the Celtic sorceress Rhiannon, when she was killing young people to absorb their energies and continue her long life. Rhiannon proposed to the Night Man that he should join her as her consort, but he refused. After the battle, Rhiannon disappeared. He was separated into two people by Rhiannon. The normal Night Man was transported to the Marvel Universe when the Black September event happened.

== In other media ==
- Night Man guest starred in the episode "Night and the Night Man" of the Ultraforce animated series. The character's origin is the same, but instead of the face stealing serial killer Deathmask being the cause of Johnny Domino becoming Night Man, a completely new villain is added for the show. Chrysalis, a mutated insect who takes the form of whomever it captures in a chrysalis, targets local businessman Roger Tremain, due to believing itself to be his stepdaughter, Elly. During a fight with Chrysalis, Johnny is teleported to UltraForce's headquarters, where Contrary attempts to recruit him onto the team. Johnny turns them down, due to Contrary being more focused on another case, but he does take up her idea about a "career change", and creates the alter ego of Night Man to battle Chrysalis. In the episode's climax, as Chrysalis takes Hardcase's form, Night Man battles Chrysalis and Chrysalis hits a tower, which electrocutes it and frees its victims. Chrysalis is defeated, but manages to escape, while its victims are released, and Elly, having learned about her stepfather's cruelty through some sort of psychic link Chrysalis had with its victims, takes over her mother's company from him.
- Glen A. Larson developed for television a live action series based on the character, starring Matt McColm as Johnny Domino, that aired in syndication from September 15, 1997, to May 17, 1999. Night Man's creator, Steve Englehart, wrote three episodes for the show.

== Possibility of revival ==
In 2003, Steve Englehart was commissioned by Marvel to relaunch the Ultraverse with the most recognizable characters, including the Night Man, but the editors decided not to resurrect the imprint. In June 2005, when asked by Newsarama whether Marvel had any plans to revive the Ultraverse (including the Night Man), Marvel editor-in-chief Joe Quesada replied:

Let's just say that I wanted to bring these characters back in a very big way, but the way that the deal was initially structured, it's next to impossible to go back and publish these books.

There are rumors out there that it has to do with a certain percentage of sales that has to be doled out to the creative teams. While this is a logistical nightmare because of the way the initial deal was structured, it's not the reason why we have chosen not to go near these characters, there is a bigger one, but I really don't feel like it's my place to make that dirty laundry public.
