= Comic Art Professional Society =

Organization of professional cartoonists in the United States

Comic Art Professional Society (CAPS)
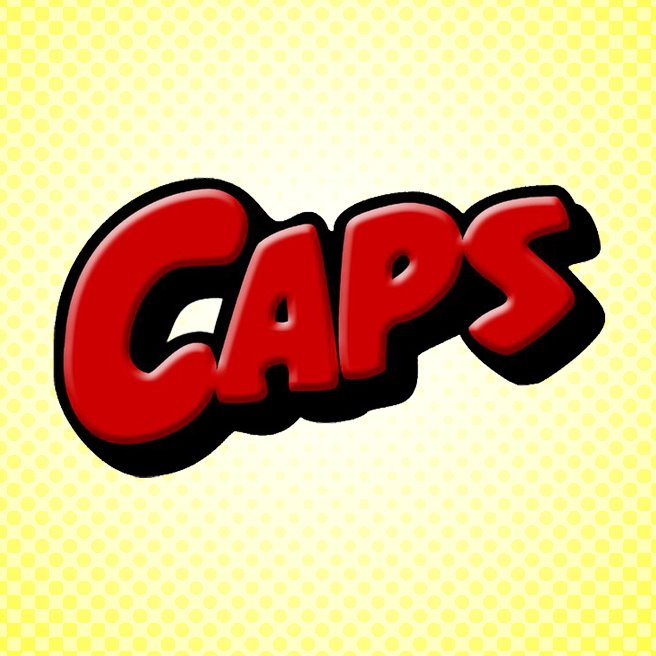
- Formation: June 9, 1977; 49 years ago
- Founder: Sergio Aragones, Don Rico and Mark Evanier
- Type: Cartoonist organization
- Location: Burbank, California
- Region served: United States
- Members: Professional cartoonists
- Website: www.capscentral.org

The Comic Art Professional Society (CAPS) is an organization of professional cartoonists in the United States. The organization's stated primary purposes are "to advance the ideals and standards of professional cartooning in its many forms", "to promote and foster a social, cultural and intellectual interchange among professional cartoonists of all types" and "to stimulate and encourage interest in and acceptance of the art of cartooning by aspiring cartoonists, students and the general public."

== History ==
The Society was founded in June 1977 when cartoonists Sergio Aragones of Mad Magazine, Don Rico of Marvel Comics, and writer Mark Evanier sought to create a non-profit monthly social group for fellow members of the profession. They enjoyed each other's company and decided to meet on a regular basis. Membership is limited to established professional cartoonists, with a few exceptions of outstanding persons in affiliated fields. CAPS is not a guild or labor union. Charter members of the organization included Jack Kirby, Scott Shaw!, and William Stout. Stout created the CAPS logo based after the logo of the Steve Canyon newspaper comic strip.

"a non-profit social-type group that will meet every month. A great many of us toil in near isolation, utterly unaware of what (and who) is happening in our field. The primary goal of CAPS is to change that.” - From the original CAPS invitation

The membership meets the second Thursday of every month to discuss happenings in the comic art business, market news, state-of-the-industry reports, and often hear from guest speakers who are at the top of their profession. CAPS exists for cartoonists and writers to interact on a social basis. CAPS hosts other special events through the year that have included picnics, art auctions, Christmas parties, and an annual banquet at which an esteemed member of the comic art profession is honored with The Sergio Award. CAPS is not a fan organization.

== Charitable causes ==
The CAPS membership has often contributed their talents to various philanthropic endeavors, such as auctions of original artwork for charity. Many times this has included raising money to assist cartoonists in need.

In 1980, CAPS was involved in donating art to benefit Childrens Hospital of Los Angeles.

In 2010, CAPS hosted an art auction to benefit veteran comic artists Russ Heath and Ralph Reese.

In May 2012, CAPS hosted an original art auction to benefit the Hairy Cell Leukemia Foundation in remembrance of comic artist Dave Stevens.

In 2014 CAPS hosted a series of original art auctions to benefit comic artist Stan Sakai and his wife with medical bills. CAPS also collaborated with Dark Horse Comics on an oversized, 160 page hardcover benefit book The Sakai Project: Artists celebrate 30 years of Usagi Yojimbo.

== Sergio Award ==
The organization hosts an annual banquet to honor an esteemed member of the profession and present their highest award for lifetime achievement, The Sergio, named after one of CAPS' co-founders Sergio Aragones. The earliest recipients of the honor received a printed award certificate, with later year's honorees receiving an award plaque. In 2006, CAPS officially gave a name to the honor – The Sergio Award - and began giving an award statue crafted in Aragones' cartoon likeness. The Sergio award statue was sculpted by Rubén Procopio.

=== Honorees ===
- 1983 Arthur Lake
- 1984 Clarence (Ducky) Nash
- 1985 Toon Voice Actors: Margaret Kerry, June Foray, Bill Scott, Daws Butler, Gary Owens
- 1986 Dr. Demento (Barry Hansen)
- 1995 Will Eisner
- 1996 Jonathan Winters
- 1997 Dan Spiegle
- 1998 Bill Melendez, Zeke Zekley
- 1999 Roger Armstrong
- 2000 Mell Lazarus
- 2001 Kelly Freas
- 2002 Stan Freberg
- 2003 Ray Bradbury
- 2005 Jerry Robinson
- 2006 Jack Davis, Sergio Aragones
- 2007 Stan Lee
- 2008 Bil Keane
- 2009 Gene Colan
- 2010 Russ Heath
- 2011 Al Jaffee
- 2013 Floyd Norman
- 2016 Drew Struzan
- 2017 Roy Thomas
- 2019 Lynn Johnston

== Don Rico Award ==
Started by former CAPS president Tone Rodriguez and originally called the Scott Shaw Award, awarded for a member who goes above and beyond to support CAPS. Shaw requested the award be renamed to honor Don Rico.

=== Honorees ===
- 2008 Jim MacQuarrie
- 2009 Stephen & Heidi Silver (Scott Shaw Award)
- 2010 Jim MacQuarrie
- 2012 Steve Wyatt
- 2016 Lonnie Millsap
- 2017 Travis Hanson
- 2018 Brad Rader

== See also ==
- Daily comic strip
- Comic Books
- Cartoon Art Museum
- San Diego Comic-Con
