= Sergio Aragonés Destroys DC =

1996 satirical comic book

- Section of page 5 of Sergio Aragonés Destroys DC (June 1996)

Publication information
- Publisher: DC Comics
- Format: One-shot
- Genre: Superhero
- Publication date: June 1996
- No. of issues: 1

Creative team
- Created by: Sergio Aragonés; Mark Evanier
- Written by: Mark Evanier
- Penciller: Sergio Aragonés
- Inker(s): Sergio Aragonés; Ron Boyd; John Byrne; John Dell; Scott Hanna; Jerry Ordway; Denis Rodier; Josef Rubinstein
- Letterer: Richard Starkings
- Colorist: Tom Luth
- Editor(s): Dan Raspler; Peter Tomasi

Sergio Aragonés Destroys DC is a comic book written by Sergio Aragonés and Mark Evanier and published in 1996. The book is a satire of DC Comics characters. They also produced an equivalent at Marvel Comics, called Sergio Aragonés Massacres Marvel, and another at Dark Horse Comics called Sergio Aragonés Stomps Star Wars.

== Plot ==
The story starts with a meeting between Martian Manhunter and the Hawkman, who has been crying for help. Hawkman warns him (and several other characters from DCU) that a great danger is coming to all superheroes, but he doesn't say what kind of danger is coming.

Aragonés and Evanier have a talk in which is made clear that Aragonés has tried to get a job in DC, but was refused (allegedly, this occurs because he draws Groo the Wanderer, or because he never drew any superheroes comics).

After the rejection, Aragones decides to draw some DC superheroes stories, reluctantly helped by Evanier, in order to get experience in the field. He starts with Superman. Jor-El, Superman's father, is talking to his wife about the imminent destruction of the planet Krypton, when suddenly the destruction itself begins. Since the rocket built by Jor-el is too small, he abandons the idea of saving himself and "chooses" to save his son, sending him to Earth (after a brief thought of sending the baby to the Sun). After the destruction of Krypton, the baby comes to Earth, where he's shown facing enemies like Lex Luthor (who hates Superman because of his hair loss) and Mister Mxyzptlk, besides being portrayed as Clark Kent, Superman's alter ego. After Superman saves a kid from being run over by a van (causing a huge traffic pileup in the process), Hawkman appears, and tells Superman "they're doomed". Superman and Hawkman then fly off the car crash scene.

Batman is the next portrayed character. After recounting Batman's origin, including his parents murder and the bat outfit choice, Aragonés shows Batman (or "The Batman", as the character constantly repeats) receiving a letter from the Joker. Batman goes to an abandoned carnival park after spending hours figuring out where the Joker is (even though the location was stated clearly in the letter), where he brutally beats an innocent clown before meeting the Joker. After a brief discussion between the two characters, Superman and Hawkman appear, and Batman leaves with them.

Wonder Woman appears next. She saves a man from being mugged, kicking the bandit in the testicles. After this, a large group of men appears and ask Wonder Woman to hit them (in an allusion to sadomasochism) when she threatens to lasso and beat up the mugger. A little girl shows up, and she leaves the scene to show the girl her lasso of truth abilities, her invisible plane and Themyscira, the Amazon island. The island is then suddenly attacked by a horde of men. These men come from the United States Supreme Court, which have decided that is illegal to restrict the access to the island in terms of gender (only women can live in Themyscira). After Hawkman arrives, Wonder Woman leaves the island.

The Legion of Super-Heroes is portrayed too, in a failed attempt to select members for the team. In the middle of the "job interviews", an alien spacecraft lands on Earth, and its commander demands to speak to the leader of the Legion. There's a huge fight to decide who's the leader. Hawkman shows up again, but leaves quickly, and the leader dispute restarts.

Finally, the Justice League of America (Superman, Batman, Wonder Woman, Hawkman, Martian Manhunter, Aquaman, The Flash, and Kyle Rayner as Green Lantern) is assembled. They try to find out who is trying to destroy them, and recount some milestone events of the DC Universe, like Barry Allen's death in Crisis on Infinite Earths and Hal Jordan becoming Parallax. It is then revealed that Aragonés himself did not choose the main villain.

After looking at old comic books, Aragonés chooses Johnny DC, the company's promotional mascot from the 1960s, as the villain. Allegedly, the character was "fired" by DC when a new comic book style was decided by the editors. Johnny DC talks briefly to the Justice League, condemning their change of attitude, and then "adapts itself to the 90s", becoming a gigantic monster, parodying the archetypes of characters of the time.

The monstrous Johnny DC attacks the Justice League (and some other characters) and defeats them easily. Superman asks Batman to think of a solution before they are all annihilated. After a merchandise page, Batman says he would buy a CD player, model CD YNNHOJ, to which Johnny DC queries "And what in the name of Mort Weisinger is a CD YNNHOJ?" Having pronounced his own name backwards (in the same trick that is used to make Mister Mxyzptlk disappear), Johnny DC is defeated and disappears in a dense smoke.

Aragonés and Evanier, after finishing the story, go to the DC headquarters, where Aragonés expects to be well treated after showing the editors the story. Aragonés is kicked out of the DC building, but the story is published anyway, because a distracted DC employee puts the story along with other Vertigo comics selected for printing.

== Awards ==
- 1997:
  - Won "Best Humor Publication" Eisner Award, with Sergio Aragonés Massacres Marvel
  - Dan Raspler won "Best Editor" Eisner Award, for work including Sergio Aragonés Destroys DC
