= Crossfire (Eclipse Comics) =

American comic book series

- Crossfire #18 cover, art by Dan Spiegle.

Publication information
- Publisher: Eclipse Comics
- Schedule: Monthly
- Format: Ongoing series
- Publication date: May 1984 – February 1988
- No. of issues: 26

Creative team
- Written by: Mark Evanier
- Artist: Dan Spiegle

Crossfire is an American comic book series created by writer Mark Evanier and artist Dan Spiegle originally for Eclipse Comics. It was a spin-off from DNAgents, which was also written by Evanier. The series ran for 26 issues from May 1984 to October 1988.

== Publication history ==
The original Crossfire - Jeff Baker - first appeared in DNAgents #4. Jay Endicott, Crossfire for the solo series, first appeared in DNAgents #9. In 1985 Evanier would state "Crossfire is the comic I enjoy the most out of anything I've written". The series originally ran for 26 issues, initially but sold poorly. This prompted a change of format from color to black and white printing to reduce expense. In turn, the series took a more realistic tone to the stories such as Endicott having to make do with only his mask after he was forced to destroy the rest of his costume to escape police custody.

In addition to the superhero adventures, Evanier used his considerable experience in the Hollywood entertainment industry to feature secondary stories of characters trying to work and survive in that business. Evanier also contributed lengthy essays on the subject in each issue with illustrations by Sergio Aragones - a tradition continued in Evanier's later series Hollywood Superstars. Dave Stevens contributed the cover to Crossfire #12, and Crossfire #19 was announced as the 400th comic published by Eclipse.

The character Jay Endicott was also the lead in a short-lived spin-off from Eclipse Comics, Whodunnit?. Lasting for three issues, the book featured "fair play" whodunit murder mystery tales solved by Crossfire's civil identity as a bailout officer and invited readers to submit their guesses for later publication and comment - a prize of $1000 was offered. Another spin-off was the four-issue limited series Crossfire and Rainbow in 1986.Crossfire ended in May 1988, partly due to Spiegel landing work on Disney's Who Framed Roger Rabbit series.

In 1994 Antarctic Press published a one shot flip book DNAgents Super Special that included a new Crossfire story by Evanier and Spiegle.

== Plot ==
The series featured the adventures of a Los Angeles bail bondsman named Jay Endicott; Endicott assumed the identity of the original Crossfire, a notorious criminal, who was murdered in the midst of one of his crimes. Endicott decided to use the costume to fight crime as a superhero while impersonating the original to take advantage of his reputation to meet underworld contacts - which the hero would then bring to justice. In an early adventure, Endicott met the DNAgents and fell in love with team-member Rainbow. He was also seriously wounded; while in the care of the Agents' organization, Crossfire was given specific enhancements to his body such as replacing his blood with an artificial chemical that mimics the characteristics of blood more efficiently.

== Collected editions ==
In 2004, About Comics released a black and white digest size collection of the first five issues (plus one issue of the tie-in series Whodunnit?) under the title Crossfire Volume 1: Hollywood Hero. The plans to produce further volumes were shelved due to unstable conditions in the comic book market at the time. The series later received a new 8-page story in the one-shot comic book Many Happy Returns, also from About Comics, in March 2008.
