= Fanboy (disambiguation) =

A fanboy is a person considered to belong to one or more fandoms to a point of obsession.

Fanboy or fanboys may also refer to:

- Fanboys (film), a 2009 American comedy film
- FANBOYS, a grammar mnemonic for the coordinating conjunctions (for, and, nor, but, or, yet, and so)
- Fan Boy, a character from the X-Statix comic book series
- Fanboy, a character from Freakazoid!
- Fanboy, a character from Fanboy & Chum Chum
- Fanboy, an animated short for Nickelodeon's Random! Cartoons which later spawned Fanboy & Chum Chum
- Fanboy, a comic book miniseries
- Fanboy, a 1973 magazine created by cartoonists Jay Lynch and Glenn Bray
