= Rubén Procopio =

American sculptor

- Born: November 21, 1961 (age 64); Buenos Aires, Argentina
- Occupations: Animation artist, comic book artist, animator, sculptor
- Years active: 1979–present

Rubén Procopio (born November 21, 1961) is an American animation and comic book artist, animator and sculptor. Long affiliated with Walt Disney Feature Animation as an animator and sculptor, Rubén is credited with restoring the maquette process to feature animation film production in the early 1980s. He is the founder of Masked Avenger Studios, whose clients include Walt Disney Studios, Warner Bros. Studios, New Line Cinema, Cartoon Network, Electric Tiki and DC Comics. He is known for his versatile sculpting and illustration style in both cartoony and realistic characters, with an emphasis on Disney characters, superheroes, and the masked heroes of yesteryear.

== Early life ==
Procopio was born in Buenos Aires, Argentina in 1961. His parents, émigrés of Italian origin, went to Los Angeles when he was four years old and his father, Adolfo Procopio, began an acclaimed 35-year career as a Walt Disney Imagineering sculptor whose works can be seen in Disney theme parks worldwide.

A seminal moment in Procopio's childhood was when he read Alex Toth's Super Friends DC Treasury process of TV Animation. Later in life, Toth became one of Procopio's close friends.

Procopio's artistic development was guided through daily drawing assignments from his father. His early dedication and discipline earned him scholarships to Cal Arts and Art Center College of Design, followed by the opportunity to join Walt Disney Feature Animation at age 18.

== Career ==
Joining Walt Disney Productions in 1980, Procopio was trained under Eric Larson, one of Disney's legendary "Nine Old Men," and other Disney veterans.

From the 1980s through the early 2000s, Procopio contributed his varied 2D and 3D talents to more than 25 feature films produced in Disney's California and Florida studios, several of which received Academy Award nominations.

Over this time, Procopio worked as an animator, artistic supervisor, head of department, character designer, story-board artist, video game supervisor, and maquette sculptor, in addition to being credited with restoring the maquette art form to the film production process. He also served as an international ambassador for Disney promoting its films, and was dispatched by Roy Disney to oversee construction of the Walt Disney Monument in Madrid, Spain. His Ursula maquette from The Little Mermaid holds a place in the Smithsonian Institution permanent collection.

In 2003, inspired by his lifelong admiration of the masked heroes of yesteryear, Procopio founded Masked Avenger Studios, specializing in sculpture, animation and design. Procopio's father Adolfo and sister Vivian also participate in Masked Avenger Studios to offer its clients more than 60 years of combined artistic experience and talent to numerous major motion picture, animation and television studios, comic book publishers, and manufacturers and designers of toys and collectible statues.

Procopio is a key contributor to the award-winning Walt Disney Classics Collection, bringing Disney characters to life through three-dimensional porcelain sculptures and promoting the products through gallery appearances. His works include Elastigirl and Edna Mode from The Incredibles, Ursula from The Little Mermaid, Genie from Aladdin, Chernabog and the 2006 Signature Series Magical Maelstrom from Fantasia (for which Procopio animated the brooms and pails of water before sculpting them), and several pieces in the Pirates of the Caribbean series.

Procopio also developed, with Electric Tiki Design, the Classic Heroes line of collectible statues, which includes such characters as The Phantom, The Green Hornet and Kato, Dick Tracy, The Lone Ranger, Zorro, Flash Gordon, The Tick, Mandrake the Magician, Prince Valiant, Tarzan and Lassie. In their Teeny Weeny line he has sculpted such memorable characters as Mighty Mouse, Woody Woodpecker, Popeye, Mr. Magoo, Rocky and Bullwinkle, Andy Panda and Chilly Willy, and in 2006 sculpted the new "Sergio" award for the Comic Art Professional Society, named for its founder, Sergio Aragonés. When he steps from his sculpting table to his drawing board, he illustrates comic books and graphic novels, including works featuring his original characters Chameleonman and Goliath. His father Adolfo and sister Vivian are the inspiration for the characters in the Chameleonman comic series.

Procopio is fluent in Spanish and Italian, and enjoys international correspondence with artist community colleagues and fans. His sister Vivian, who contributes her design and project management talents, also enjoyed a long career as a Research Administrator in the Walt Disney Feature Animation Research Library.

== Filmography ==
- The Plastic Man Comedy/Adventure Show (1979) (Character Design Dept.)
- The Fox and The Hound (1981)
- The Black Cauldron (1985) (Animator and Storyboard Artist)
- The Great Mouse Detective (1986)
- Oliver & Company (1988) (Maquette Sculptor)
- The Little Mermaid (1989) (Maquette Sculptor)
- The Prince and the Pauper (1990) (Key Clean-up Supervisor)
- The Rescuers Down Under (1990) (Maquette Sculptor)
- Beauty and the Beast (1991) (Maquette Sculptor and Artistic Supervisor: Clean-up Dept. / Florida Unit)
- Aladdin (1992) Artistic Supervisor (Clean-up Dept. / Florida Unit)
- Trail Mix-Up (1993) Artistic Supervisor (Clean-up Dept.)
- The Lion King (1994) Artistic Supervisor (Clean-up Dept. / Florida Unit)
- Pocahontas (1995) Artistic Supervisor (Clean-up Dept. / Florida Unit)
- The Hunchback of Notre Dame (1996)
- Mulan (1998) Artistic Supervisor (Clean-up Dept.)
- Tarzan (1999)
- Atlantis: The Lost Empire (2001)
- Lorenzo (2004) Digital Clean-up
- Home on the Range (2004)
- Disney's Timeless Tales 2005 (Key Clean-up Supervisor: Prince and the Pauper) 2005
- Tom and Jerry's Giant Adventure (2013) Character Layout
- Ben 10: Omniverse (2014) (Storyboard Artist - 2 Episodes)
- Ben 10: Ultimate Alien (2010) (Storyboard Artist)
- Tom and Jerry: The Lost Dragon (2014) Character Layout
- Tom and Jerry: Spy Quest (2015) Animator and Character Layout
- Tom and Jerry: Willy Wonka and the Chocolate Factory (2015)
- Tom and Jerry: Back to Oz (Animator and Storyboard Artist) 2016
- DC Super Hero Girls: Super Hero High (Storyboard Artist) 2016
- Batman: Return of the Caped Crusaders (2016) (Storyboard Artist)
- Lego Scooby-Doo! Blowout Beach Bash (2017) (Storyboard Artist)
- DC Super Hero Girls 2016-2017 (Storyboard Artist)
- Batman vs. Two-Face (2017) (Storyboard Artist)
- Scooby-Doo! & Batman: The Brave and the Bold (2018) (Storyboard Artist)
- Scooby-Doo! and the Gourmet Ghost (Storyboard Artist) 2018
- Lego DC Batman: Family Matters (Storyboard Artist) 2019
- Lego DC: Shazam! Magic and Monsters (Storyboard Artist) 2020
- Scooby-Doo and Guess Who / 5 episodes (Storyboard Artist) 2019-2020
- Space Jam: A New Legacy (Animator, Storyboard Artist and Pre Vis) 2021
- Batman Knightfall Trilogy (Storyboard Artist) 2026
- Coyote vs. Acme (Visual Development Dept., Animation Ass't.) 2026

== Collectibles, Video Gaming, Comics work ==
- Genie, "Magic at his Fingertips", Walt Disney Classics Collection
- Walt Disney with Oswald, "True Originals", Designed and sculpted, Walt Disney Classics Collection
- Sorcerer Mickey, Yen Sid and Brooms, "Magical Maelstrom", Walt Disney Classics Collection
- Edna Mode, "It's my way or the runway" Walt Disney Classics Collection
- Elastigirl, "Limber Lady", Walt Disney Classics Collection
- Shere Khan, "Savage Sophisticate" Walt Disney Classics Collection
- Elliot, "A Boy's Best Friend" Walt Disney Classics Collection
- Orville, Bernard & Bianca, "Cleared for Take Off" Walt Disney Classics Collection
- Maleficent, "Sinister Sorceress" Walt Disney Classics Collection
- Witch, "Poisonous Plot" Snow White and the Seven Dwarfs, Walt Disney Classics Collection
- Brer Rabbit & Brear Fox, "Cooking up a Plan" "Last Laugh", Walt Disney Classics Collection
- Disney's Aladdin (1993; video game);
- The Lion King (1994; video game) (special thanks);cdcC
- "Name's Hades, Lord of the Dead" Hades, Walt Disney Classics Collection;
- Ursula at Vanity: Devilish Diva, Ursula, Walt Disney Classics Collection;
- "Drink Up, Me 'earties!" Pirate With Pigs, Walt Disney Classics Collection;
- "A Pirate's Life For Me" Pirate on Archway, Walt Disney Classics Collection;
- "Peligro, Explosivos!" Pirat on Cannon (Mr. Coote), Walt Disney Classics Collection
- Lockjaw, Marvel/Bowen;
- Flash Gordon, Classic Heroes – Electric Tiki;
- Dick Tracy, Classic Heroes – Electric Tiki;
- The Green Hornet & Kato, Classic Heroes – Electric Tiki;
- Mandrake the Magician, Classic Heroes – Electric Tiki;
- Prince Valiant, Classic Heroes – Electric Tiki;
- Tarzan, Classic Heroes – Electric Tiki;
- The Shadow, Classic Heroes – Electric Tiki;
- Doc Savage, Classic Heroes – Electric Tiki;
- Tron, Classic Heroes – Electric Tiki;
- Shazam, DC Direct;
- Phantom, Classic Heroes – Electric Tiki;
- The Lone Ranger, Classic Heroes – Electric Tiki;
- Lassie, Classic Heroes – Electric Tiki;
- Zorro, Classic Heroes – Electric Tiki;
- Captain Action, Classic Heroes – Electric Tiki;
- Mighty Mouse, 1 & 2– Teeny Weeny Series – Electric Tiki;
- Popeye the Sailorman, Famous Studios & Fleishcher Studios Versions– Teeny Weeny Series – Electric Tiki;
- Mr. Magoo– Teeny Weeny Series – Electric Tiki;
- Underdog– Teeny Weeny Series – Electric Tiki;
- Chilly Willy– Teeny Weeny Series – Electric Tiki;
- Rocky & Bullwinkle– Teeny Weeny Series – Electric Tiki;
- Andy Panda– Teeny Weeny Series – Electric Tiki;
- Woody Woodpecker. 1940's Retro, 1947 Classic, 1957 Modern– Teeny Weeny Series – Electric Tiki;
- Darkwing Duck– Teeny Weeny Series – Electric Tiki;
- Tinker Bell, Grand Jester Bust
- Uncle Scrooge, Grand Jester Bust
- Maleficent, Grand Jester Bust
- Horned King, Grand Jester Bust,
- Prince or Persia, Grand Jester Bust
- Comic Art Professionals Society “Sergio” Award;
- Cover, Alter Ego #63 [Alex Toth edition], December 2006;
- Cover and story with Ron Marz, First American Phantom Annual, Moonstone Comics;
- Illustrator, The Phantom Chronicles, Moonstone Books;
- Author, The Phantom Chronicles Artist's Annex, Moonstone Books and Masked Avenger Studios;
- Interior Illustrator, Tales of Zorro, Moonstone Books
- Batman'66 Issue #5, DC Comics; (Artist)
- Batman'66 Issue #8, DC Comics; (Artist)
- Batman'66 Issue #20, DC Comics; (Artist)
