= Hollywood Superstars =

Publication information
- Publisher: Epic Comics
- Format: Ongoing series
- Genre: Adventure
- No. of issues: 5

Creative team
- Written by: Mark Evanier
- Artist: Dan Spiegle

Hollywood Superstars is a comic book series created by writer Mark Evanier and artist Dan Spiegle originally for Epic Comics, an imprint for Marvel Comics for creator owned properties, and ran from November 1990 to April 1991. Thematically, it is similar to an early series by the same team, Crossfire, published by Eclipse Comics, but without the superhero element.

== Premise ==
The series featured the adventures of Jerry Naylor, a stunt coordinator disillusioned the film industry, Melody, an aspiring actress trying break into the business and Leo Haney, a good natured stand up comedian. Together, they run a private detective agency in Hollywood, where they deal with various crises such as irresponsible professionals who recklessly endanger innocents in the making of films.

In keeping with the creative team's tradition, Evanier also posted lengthy essays about the entertainment industry with color illustrations by famed cartoonist, Sergio Aragones.

== Production history ==
The series was commissioned by then Epic editor, Archie Goodwin, who wanted a regular series for the imprint by a reliable creative team that could appeal to a different audience than Marvel's usual fandom. Goodwin anticipated running the series for 1–2 years, possibly at a small loss, while using it to explore alternative means of distribution. Furthermore, the stories would be later bound in trade paperbacks for sale in book stores; it's a retail concept that would become regular practice in subsequent decades.

The arrangements with Marvel's legal team took 10 months to develop an acceptable contract with Evanier and Spiegle. By then, Goodwin had moved to DC Comics and the current editorship had no interest in marketing material beyond their mainstream comics audience and the title proved short-lived as a result.

In 2014, About Comics collected the material for the first time, releasing the entire run in a single black-and-white volume.
