= King of Comics (disambiguation) =

Ralf König (born 1960) a German comic creator. King of Comics May also refer to:

- Jack Kirby (1917-1994), American comic writer
  - Kirby: King of Comics, a 2008 biography of Jack Kirby
