= Mark Evanier =

American comic book and television writer

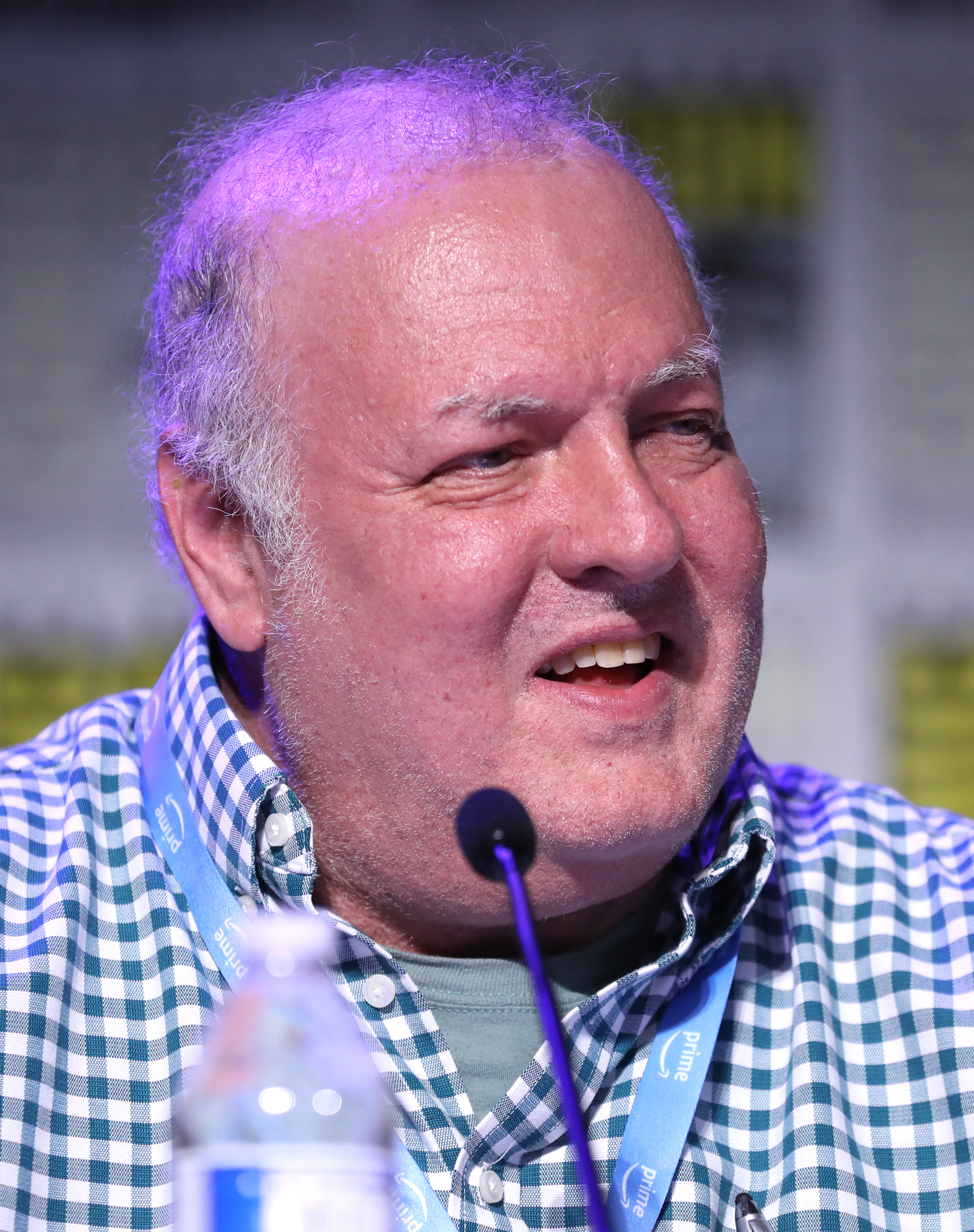
- Evanier in 2023
- Born: Mark Stephen Evanier; March 2, 1952 (age 74); Santa Monica, California, U.S.
- Occupations: Author, screenwriter, biographer, comics historian
- Writing career
- Years active: 1969–present
- Genres: Comic books, television sitcoms, cartoons, biographical books
- Notable works: Blackhawk; Crossfire; The DNAgents; Garfield and Friends; Kirby: King of Comics; The Plastic Man Comedy/Adventure Show; Richie Rich; Scooby-Doo; The Garfield Show
- Website: www.newsfromme.com

Mark Stephen Evanier (/ˈɛvənɪər/; born March 2, 1952) is an American comic book and television writer, known for his work on the animated TV series Garfield and Friends and wordplay for the comic book Groo the Wanderer. He is also known for his columns and blog News from ME, and for his work as a historian and biographer of the comics industry, such as his award-winning Jack Kirby biography, Kirby: King of Comics.

== Early life ==
Evanier identifies as Jewish. His father was Jewish and his mother was Catholic. He chose to be a writer after witnessing the misery his father felt from working for the Internal Revenue Service and contrasting that with the portrayal of a writer's life on The Dick Van Dyke Show. He graduated from University High School in 1969. Evanier attended UCLA but left before graduating.

== Career ==
Evanier was president of a Los Angeles comic book club from 1966 to 1969. In 1967, he suggested the titles of the officers of the Merry Marvel Marching Society. He made his first professional sale in 1969; that same year, through a mutual association with a Marvel Comics mail-order firm, he was taken on as a production assistant to Jack Kirby. Several years later Evanier began writing foreign comic books for the Walt Disney Studio Program, then from 1972 to 1976 wrote scripts for Gold Key Comics, including "The Greatest of E's", where he revealed that the E in Wile E. Coyote stands for "Ethelbert", and comics for the Edgar Rice Burroughs estate.

In 1974, he teamed with writer Dennis Palumbo and wrote for a number of television series, including The Nancy Walker Show, The McLean Stevenson Show, and Welcome Back, Kotter, on which he was a story editor.

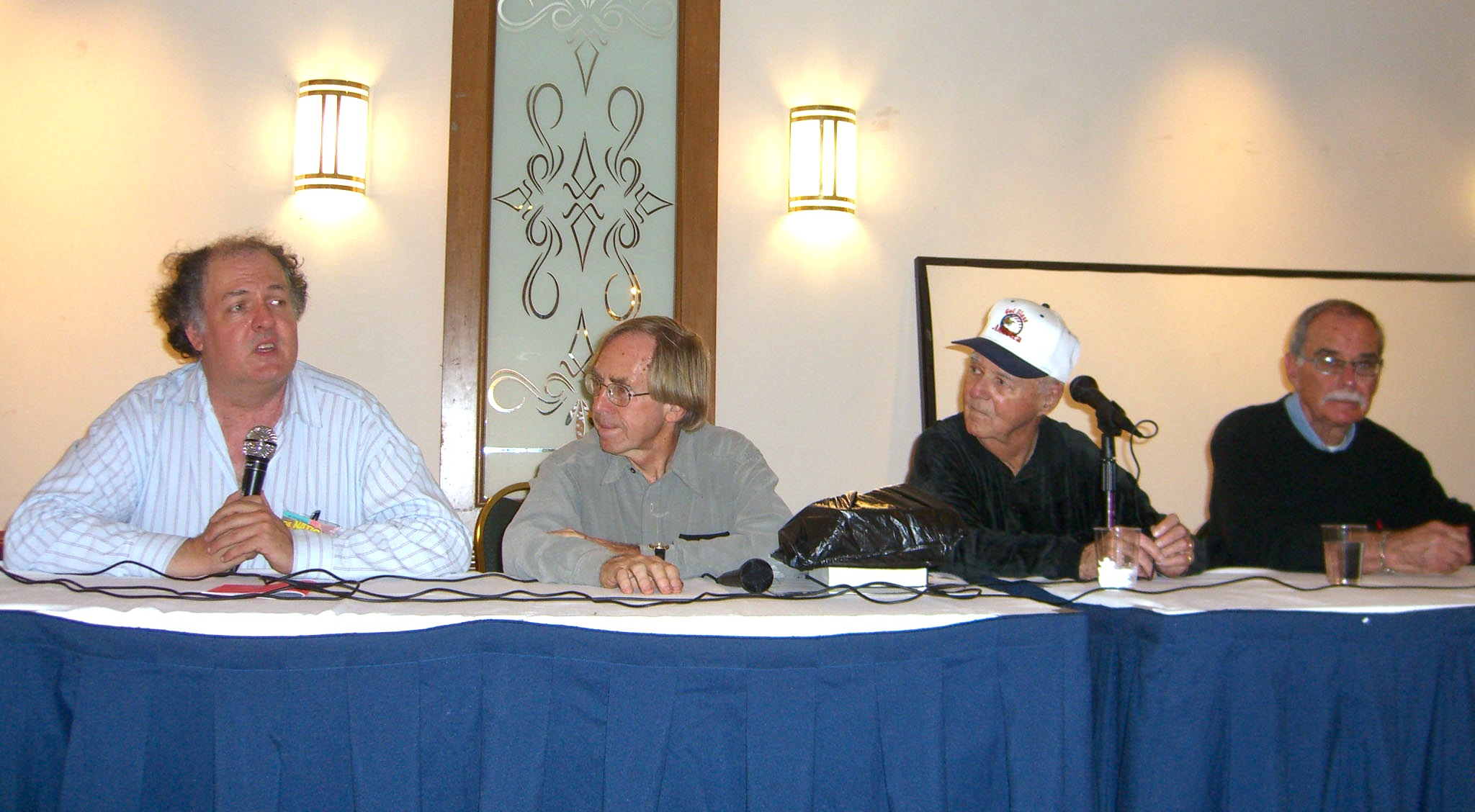
Evanier speaking on a panel about Jack Kirby with (from left to right) Roy Thomas, Joe Sinnott and Stan Goldberg, at the Big Apple Con in Manhattan, November 15, 2008

After leaving Kotter in 1977 and amicably ending his partnership with Palumbo, Evanier wrote for and eventually ran the Hanna-Barbera comic book division. He also wrote a number of variety shows and specials, and he began writing for animated cartoon shows, including Scooby-Doo and Scrappy-Doo, The Plastic Man Comedy/Adventure Show, Thundarr the Barbarian, The ABC Weekend Special, Yogi Bear's All Star Comedy Christmas Caper, Richie Rich, The Wuzzles, and Dungeons & Dragons. He is most noted in animation for his work on Garfield and Friends, a seven-season series for which Evanier wrote or co-wrote nearly every episode and acted as voice recording director. Since 2008, Evanier has been the co-writer and voice director of The Garfield Show, which won a Daytime Emmy Award for Outstanding Performer in an Animated Program for June Foray.

Evanier credits himself with convincing Jack Kirby to stop using Vince Colletta as an inker, and he considers himself one of Colletta's "main vilifiers".

He wrote a script and provided "'technical advice' about comic books" for Bob, Bob Newhart's unsuccessful third sitcom for CBS.

He has produced a number of comic books, including Blackhawk, Crossfire and Hollywood Superstars (with Dan Spiegle), Groo the Wanderer (with Sergio Aragonés), and The DNAgents (with Will Meugniot). For the Spiegle comics, Evanier contributed lengthy essays on the entertainment industry. In 1985, he launched the DC Challenge limited series with artist Gene Colan. He wrote the New Gods series of 1989–1991. Evanier collaborated with Joe Staton on the Superman & Bugs Bunny mini-series in 2000.

For many years, Evanier wrote a regular column, "Point of View", for Comics Buyer's Guide.

Evanier's illustrated Jack Kirby biography, Kirby: King of Comics, was published in February 2008 by Abrams Books. It won the 2009 Eisner Award for Best Comics-Related Book. Evanier collaborated with Aragonés and Thomas Yeates on the Groo vs. Conan crossover for Dark Horse Comics in 2014.

In 1970, Evanier attended the Golden State Comic Con in San Diego, the first annual gathering of what came to be known as San Diego Comic-Con. Evanier is one of a small group of people (estimated at six or fewer) who have attended every year. In 1973, he first hosted a panel at the yearly event and the volume soon escalated to the point where he was hosting as many as fourteen over a four-day convention. They usually include Quick Draw!, which pits fast cartoonists against one another to respond with drawings to challenges Evanier throws at them; the Annual Jack Kirby Tribute Panel, Cover Story (artists discussing the skills involved in creating covers for comic books), and several panels about the art of providing voices for animated cartoons. For years, he hosted the annual Golden Age Panel featuring artists and writers who'd worked in comic books in the 1940s but it ended after 2010 due to a lack of available panelists and was replaced by That 70's Panel, celebrating comic book creators from that era. Evanier also serves as Administrator of the Bill Finger Award for Excellence in Comic Book Writing. Several of the panels he hosts at Comic-Con also appear at the annual WonderCon in Anaheim, California.

In April 2022, Evanier contributed to Operation USA's benefit anthology book, Comics for Ukraine: Sunflower Seeds, a project spearheaded by IDW Publishing Special Projects Editor Scott Dunbier, whose profits would be donated to relief efforts for Ukrainian refugees resulting from the February 2022 Russian invasion of Ukraine.

== Personal life ==
In the 1990s, Evanier was one of several investors who bought the Hamptons Hollywood Cafe. The restaurant had been opened by Paul Newman and Ron Buck in the 1970s and was frequented by filmmakers and actors, but declined in popularity during the late 1980s. After Evanier's investment, the restaurant was renovated and its menu updated, but it failed to turn a profit and was closed in 2002.

On May 26, 2006, Evanier underwent gastric bypass surgery at Cedars-Sinai Medical Center in Los Angeles. Having peaked at around 344 pounds (156 kg) by then, he subsequently lost nearly 99 pounds (45 kg) by June 2007.

Mark Evanier was the longtime companion of cartoonist Carolyn Kelly, daughter of Pogo creator Walt Kelly. Her death in 2017 was announced by Evanier.

== Awards ==
- 1975: Won Inkpot Award
- 1992: Won "Best Humor Publication" Eisner Award for Groo the Wanderer
- 1997: Won "Best Humor Publication" Eisner Award for Sergio Aragonés Destroys DC and Sergio Aragonés Massacres Marvel
- 1999: Won "Best Humor Publication" Eisner Award for Sergio Aragonés Groo
- 2001: Won "Bob Clampett Humanitarian Award"
- 2003: Won Animation Writer's Caucus of the Writers Guild of America, West Lifetime Achievement Award
- 2009: Kirby: King of Comics won "Best Comics-Related Book" Eisner Award; "Best Biographical, Historical, or Journalistic Presentation" and "Special Award for Excellence in Presentation" Harvey Award

== Bibliography ==
=== Comic books ===
==== Archie Comics ====
- Scooby-Doo #10, 14, 17 (1996–1997)

==== Boom! Studios ====
- Garfield #1–32 (2012–2014)

==== Comico Comics ====
- Space Ghost #1 (1987)

==== Dark Horse Comics ====
- Flaxen #1 (1992)
- Groo vs. Conan #1–4 (2014)
- Sergio Aragonés Groo: 25th Anniversary Special (2007)
- Sergio Aragonés Stomps Star Wars (2000)

==== DC Comics ====
- Blackhawk #251–273 (1982–1984)
- Countdown to Mystery #8 (Doctor Fate) (2008)
- DC Challenge #1, 12 (1985–1986)
- DC Comics Presents #64, 69 (1983–1984)
- Fanboy #1–6 (1999)
- House of Mystery #214 (1973)
- Legends of the DC Universe #14 (1999)
- Mister Miracle Special #1 (1987)
- New Gods vol. 3 #1, 5–28 (1989–1991)
- Secret Origins #12 (Challengers of the Unknown) (1987)
- Sergio Aragonés Destroys DC #1 (1996)
- Solo #11 (2006)
- Spirit #14–25 (2008–2009)
- Superman & Bugs Bunny #1–4 (2000)
- Superman Adventures #14–15, 42, 53 (1997–2001)
- Teen Titans Spotlight #21 (1988)
- Welcome Back, Kotter #4 (1977)

==== Eclipse Comics ====
- Destroyer Duck #1 ("Great Moments in Comic Book History" backup story) (1982)
- The DNAgents #1–24 (1983–1985)
- Crossfire #1–26 (1984–1987)
- Groo the Wanderer Special #1 (1984)
- The New DNAgents #1–17 (1985–1987)
- Three Dimensional DNAgents #1 (1986)

==== Gemstone Publishing ====
- Mickey Mouse and Blotman: Blotman Returns ("Now Museum, Now You Don't.") (2006)

==== Gold Key ====
- Hanna-Barbera Scooby-Doo... Mystery Comics #21–25, 27–30 (1973–1975)

==== IDW Publishing ====
- Rocky and Bullwinkle #1–4 (2014)

==== Marvel Comics ====
- Dynomutt #1–6 (1977–1979)
- The Flintstones #1–9 (1977–1979)
- The Funtastic World of Hanna-Barbera #1 ("The Flintstones Christmas Party"); #3 ("The Flintstones Visit the Laff-a-Lympics") (1977–1978)
- Hanna-Barbera Spotlight #1–4 (1978–1979)
- Laff-A-Lympics #1–13 (1978–1979)
- Marvel Premiere #49 (Falcon) (1979)
- Marvel Super Special #29 (Tarzan) (1984)
- Scooby-Doo #1–9 (1977–1979)
- Sergio Aragonés Massacres Marvel #1 (1996)
- TV Stars #1–4 (1978–1979)
- Yogi Bear #1–9 (1977–1979)

===== Epic Comics =====
- The Death of Groo graphic novel (1988)
- Epic Illustrated #27 (1984)
- The Groo Chronicles #1–6 (1989)
- Hollywood Superstars #1–5 (1990–1991)
- The Life of Groo graphic novel (1993)
- Sergio Aragonés Groo the Wanderer #1–120 (1985–1995)

==== Pacific Comics ====
- Groo the Wanderer #1–8 (1982–1984)
- Starslayer #5 (Groo backup story) (1982)

=== Books ===
- Kirby: King of Comics. Abrams Books. 2008. p. 228. ISBN 978-0810994478.
- Mad Art : A Visual Celebration of the Art of Mad Magazine and the Idiots Who Create It. Watson-Guptill. 2003. 304 p. ISBN 978-0823030804.
- The Essential Peanuts by Charles M. Schulz: The Greatest Comic Strip of All Time. Harry N. Abrams. 2025. 336 p. ISBN 978-1419784170.

== Television credits ==
Series head writer denoted in bold.

- The Nancy Walker Show (1976)
- The McLean Stevenson Show (1976)
- Welcome Back, Kotter (1976)
- The Love Boat (1977)
- Baby, I’m Back (1978)
- The Krofft Superstar Hour (1978)
- Scooby-Doo and Scrappy-Doo (1979–1980)
- Pink Lady (1980)
- The Plastic Man Comedy/Adventure Show (1980)
- The Richie Rich/Scooby-Doo Show (1980–1981)
- Thundarr the Barbarian (1980–1981)
- Goldie Gold and Action Jack (1981)
- Trollkins (1981)
- Yogi Bear’s All Star Comedy Christmas Caper (1982)
- Dungeons & Dragons (1983)
- ABC Weekend Specials (1984)
- Pryor's Place (1984)
- The Wuzzles (1985)
- CBS Storybreak (1985)
- **Garfield and Friends** (1988–1994)
- Superboy (1989)
- **Mother Goose and Grimm** (1991)
- Bob (1993)
- **The Twisted Tales of Felix the Cat** (1996–1997)
- Superman: The Animated Series (1997)
- **Channel Umptee-3** (1997)
- **The Garfield Show** (2009–2012, 2015–2016)
