= The DNAgents =

Comic book title published by Eclipse Comics

- The cover to The DNAgents #1 by Will Meugniot and Al Gordon

Publication information
- Publisher: Eclipse Comics (1983–1988); Antarctic Press (1994)
- First appearance: DNAgents #1 (March 1983)
- Created by: Mark Evanier; Will Meugniot

In-story information
- Species: Genetically engineered humans
The DNAgents
Publication information
- Publisher: Eclipse Comics
- Schedule: Monthly
- Format: Ongoing series
- No. of issues: 24 (The DNAgents); 17 (The New DNAgents)
- Main character(s): Amber; Rainbow; Sham; Surge; Tank
Creative team
- Written by: Mark Evanier
- Artist(s): Will Meugniot; Mitch Schauer; Erik Larsen
- Editor: Cat Yronwode

The DNAgents is a comic-book series created by writer Mark Evanier and artist Will Meugniot and published by Eclipse Comics from 1983. The series centers on a team of superheroes created through genetic engineering by the Matrix Corporation to act as superhuman enforcers for the head of the company.

== Publication history ==
The DNAgents by Will Meugniot

Both Marvel Comics and DC Comics expressed interest in publishing The DNAgents, but Evanier and Meugniot decided against signing with them because they would have had to give up the TV and merchandising rights, and since both had extensive backgrounds and contacts in the television industry, they were confident that they would be able to sell DNAgents as a TV series without help from a publisher. Mike Friedrich served as an agent for Evanier and Meugniot, submitting The DNAgents to five different publishers. When all five offered to publish it, they decided on large independent publisher Eclipse Comics for the amount of creative freedom they were ready to allow and for their strong plan for promoting the series.

Eclipse published DNAgents from March 1983 to July 1985, reaching 24 issues. After drawing the first 14 issues, Meugniot moved to other projects. Richard Howell, Dan Spiegle, Jerry Ordway and Mitch Schauer were among the artists to guest on the title, with the final issue featuring a cover by Dave Stevens. The series was then relaunched as The New DNAgents with a new #1 and Schauer as the main artist. The comic was initially as part of Eclipse's line of 75¢ titles - though the price proved unsustainable and the title reverted to 95¢ from #7. The New DNAgents ran to 17 issues, and featured guest art from Chuck Patton, Mike Sekowsky, Rick Hoberg before Erik Larsen became the regular artist for the final five issues - among his earliest paid professional work.

Further spin-offs included Crossfire (26 issues between May 1984 and February 1988), the 4-issue mini-series Surge and Crossfire and Rainbow, and the stereoscopy one-shot Three Dimensional DNAgents.

In 1994, Antarctic Press released a single issue retelling their story; this had originally been produced as a sample strip for pitching to TV networks. The DNAgents reappeared in a brief cameo appearance as guests at the wedding of Barbaric and Ricochet in the Savage Dragon comic series. In 2004, About Comics reprinted several issues in digest form, and in June 2006, reprinted issues were collected into DNAgents Volume 1 by Image Comics.

== Characters ==
=== DNAgents ===
- Tank: The team's gentle giant with super-strength, and an armored weapon suit. Socially awkward, he seeks friendship and love with other people.
- Surge: An impulsive, arrogant hothead who can control and generate electricity.
- Amber: She could manipulate magnetic energy to create shields or energy blasts, or enable her to fly. Very outgoing, social and curious.
- Rainbow: A telepath who can create and manipulate illusions, and dabbled in nude modeling.
- Sham: The youngster of the team, and a shapeshifter and infiltration agent. However, he suffers from a strong, nearly crippling shyness of strangers, and considers the rest of his team the only people he can trust. He is also extremely sensitive to bright lights.

=== Others ===
- Crossfire was a frequent guest character, and a romantic interest for Rainbow.
- In issue #13, an attempt to create a new DNAgent resulted in Snafu, who later became a pet to Sham.
- In issue #14, the DNAgents engaged in a "non-crossover" with the Teen Titans comic where each team faced a homage of the other with the DNAgents meeting up with "Project Youngblood" while the Titans dealt with the genetically-engineered "ReCombatants" in Tales of the Teen Titans #48. At the end of both stories, the homage/parody teams sacrificed themselves to save the main heroes.

== Other media ==
- CBS expressed interest in a live-action pilot of DNAgents for the Fall 1985 season. Meugniot was hired to storyboard the opening sequence, while Irvin Kershner was linked to a role as director. However, the pilot was never made.
- In 1986 a sourcebook was printed by Fantasy Games Unlimited for using the characters with their Villains and Vigilantes superhero role playing game. This book also contained conversion notes for Champions and Superworld RPGs.
