= Drew Struzan =

American illustrator (1947–2025)

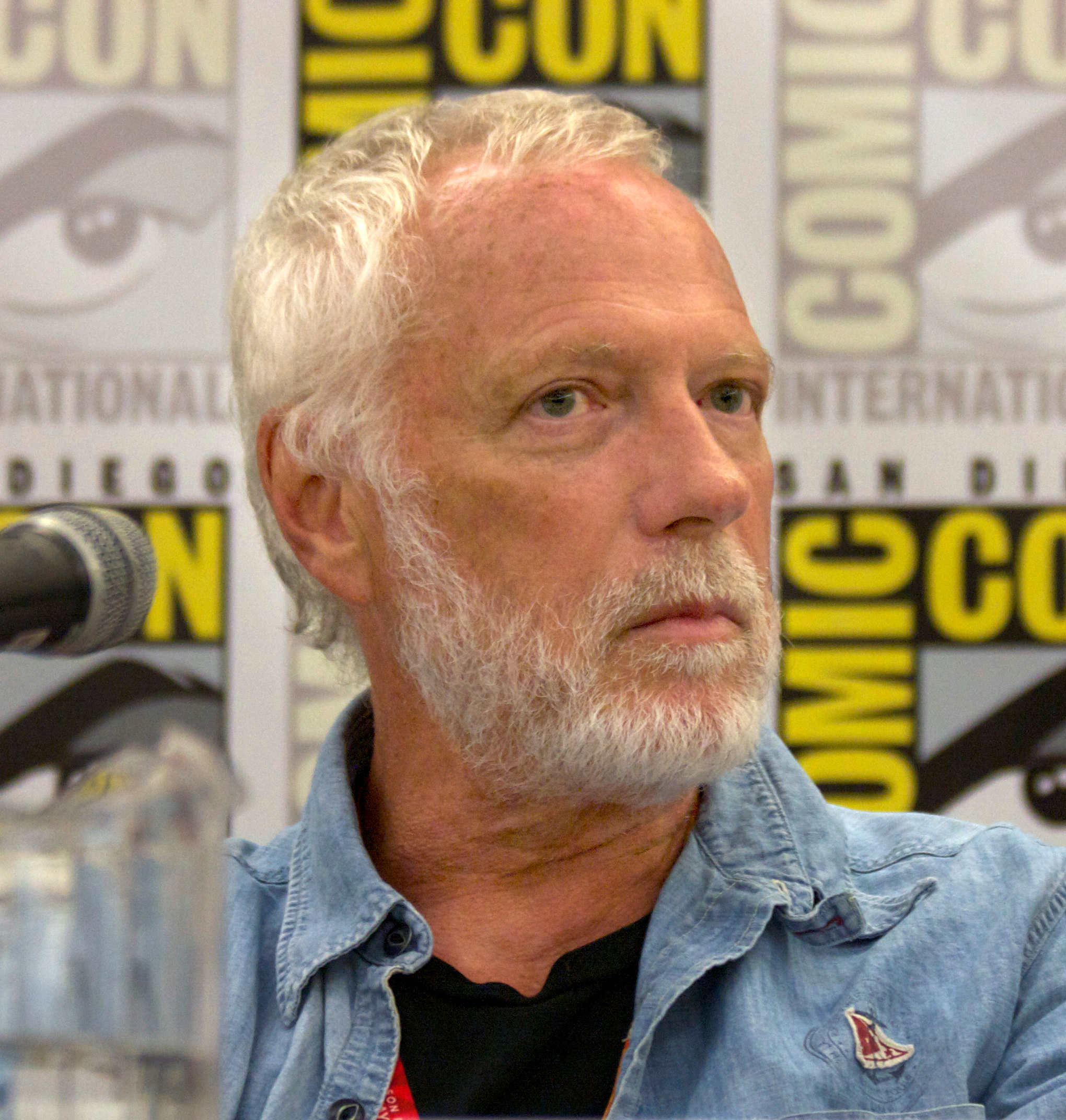
- Struzan at the 2012 San Diego Comic-Con
- Born: Howard Drew Struzansky; March 18, 1947; Oregon City, Oregon, U.S.
- Died: October 13, 2025 (aged 78); Pasadena, California, U.S.
- Education: ArtCenter College of Design (BFA)
- Known for: Poster art, illustration
- Spouse: Dylan Struzan
- Children: 1
- Awards: Saturn Award, 2002; Inkpot Award, 2010; Saul Bass Award, 2014; Sergio Award, 2016; Society of Illustrators Hall of Fame, 2020

Signature
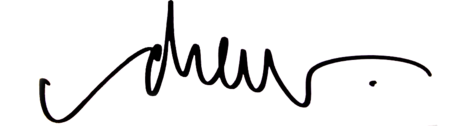

Drew Struzan (/ˈstruːzən/; March 18, 1947 – October 13, 2025) was an American artist, illustrator, and cover designer. He was known for his more than 150 film posters, which include The Shawshank Redemption, Blade Runner, E.T. the Extra-Terrestrial, as well as films in the Indiana Jones, Back to the Future, Harry Potter, and Star Wars film series. He also painted album covers, collectibles, and book covers.

Struzan was known for his airbrushed one-sheets technique when designing film posters. He began using this process early in his career when he designed posters for B movies. The technique was well received by such film directors as Steven Spielberg and George Lucas, both frequent collaborators.

During his career, he was awarded a Saturn Award in 2002 and an Inkpot Award in 2010. He received several lifetime achievement honors such as the 2014 Saul Bass Award, the 2016 Sergio Award for Lifetime Achievement from the Comic Art Professional Society (CAPS) and was inducted into the Society of Illustrators Hall of Fame in 2020.

== Early life ==
Howard Drew Struzansky was born in Oregon City, Oregon, on March 18, 1947. In 1965, at age 18, he enrolled at the ArtCenter College of Design, then in West Los Angeles.

During his college years, Struzan thought about his interests and was told his career options would be either fine art or illustration. Struzan chose to be an illustrator due to the financial stability aspect of it. In his first year in college, he married and became a father. Struzan worked his way through school by selling his artwork and accepting small commissions. He graduated in five years, earning a Bachelor of Arts degree with honors. He also completed two years of graduate studies.

== Career ==
=== Early career ===
After graduating from college, Struzan remained in Los Angeles, and a trip to an employment agency found him a job as a staff artist for Pacific Eye & Ear, a design studio. Struzan said he decided to become an illustrator instead of a fine artist because "I was poor and hungry, and illustration was the shortest path to a slice of bread, as compared to a gallery showing. I had nothing as a child. I drew on toilet paper with pencils – that was the only paper around. Probably why I love drawing so much today is because it was just all I had at the time." There he began designing album covers under the direction of Ernie Cefalu, relishing the creative aspects the 12x12" size the record packaging afforded him.

His professional breakthrough came with his first commercial album cover commission with the studio: the May 1973 Grunt/RCA LP Baron Von Tollbooth and the Chrome Nun by Jefferson Airplane founders Paul Kantner and Grace Slick alongside David Frieberg, featuring guest appearances by Jerry Garcia and David Crosby. Originally developed under the album's working title Fat, Struzan's initial charcoal composition impressed Slick with his command of human anatomy.

Over the next 5 years, he would create album cover artwork for a long line of musical artists, including Tony Orlando and Dawn, the Beach Boys, Bee Gees, Roy Orbison, Black Sabbath, Glenn Miller, Iron Butterfly, Bach, Earth, Wind & Fire, and Liberace. He also illustrated the T-shirt that George Carlin wears on the front and back cover of his 1974 album Toledo Window Box.

Among these, Struzan illustrated the album cover artwork for Alice Cooper's 1975 album Welcome to My Nightmare, which Rolling Stone would go on to vote one of the 100 Classic Album Covers. Despite the burgeoning demand for his talents, however, Struzan was still only earning $150 to $250 per album cover.

=== 1970s–1980s: Airbrushed one-sheets ===
Struzan was hired by Pencil Pushers, a company that was started by Bill Pate, a long time well known art director famous for his one sheet designs for American International Pictures. It was during this time that he was mentored, and learned the distinctive one-sheet style that he adopted as his own and first became proficient in the use of the airbrush, which would later define him as a master of the tool. His first film poster works started appearing in 1975, although in those early days Struzan mainly did artwork for Pencil Pushers for B-movies, such as Empire of the Ants, Food of the Gods, and Squirm.

Star Wars 1978 re-release style D "circus" poster. Art by Charles White III and Drew Struzan.

In 1977 fellow artist Charles White III, well known for his own airbrush prowess, had been hired by David Weitzner, Vice President of advertising at 20th Century Fox, to create a poster design for the 1978 re-release of Star Wars. White, uncomfortable with portraiture, asked Struzan for his help on the project. As such, Struzan painted the human characters in oil paints and White focused on the ships, Darth Vader, C-3PO, and all the mechanical details of the poster art.

The unique poster design, popularly called the "Circus" poster, depicts what appears to be a torn posted bill on a plywood construction site wall. "It was necessity that invented that," Struzan explains. "They found out there wasn't enough room for the typography and the billing block they had left in the design. What can we do to make more space on a poster that's already been printed? Let's pretend it's posted, then they can put the type below the actual poster. We painted Obi-Wan down the side and stuff across the bottom to make it wider and deeper."

Throughout the 1970s and 1980s while employed by Pencil Pushers, Struzan helped to produce poster work for such films as The Seven-Per-Cent Solution, Blade Runner, The Thing, The Cannonball Run, the Police Academy series, Back to the Future, Indiana Jones and the Temple of Doom, Indiana Jones and the Last Crusade, E.T. the Extra-Terrestrial, The Muppet Movie, Coming to America, First Blood, Risky Business, D.C. Cab, Stroker Ace, Batteries Not Included, An American Tail, and The Goonies.

During this period, Struzan continued his association with Lucas by designing the original Industrial Light & Magic logo, and creating the associated one-sheet artwork for both the continuing Star Wars saga and the Indiana Jones series of films. In the process, Struzan's work became, in the public mind, the defining visual images representing those series. As such, he was also sought after to create new artwork for re-releases and reissues on video and DVD, book covers, theme-park rides and video game titles for those properties.

=== 1990s–2000s: Established career ===
In the 1990s, with the advent of computers and digital manipulation of images utilized to create poster art, Struzan was affected by the decline of traditionally illustrated poster art. While continuing to create artwork for such 1990s and 2000s films as Hook, Mallrats, Hellboy and the American poster for Harry Potter and the Philosopher's Stone, he started exploring other outlets for his work, including comic books, limited-edition art, and the collectible market. As such, his work has been featured on such diverse items as Franklin Mint collectible plates, including a twelve-piece set commemorating the life of Princess Diana, the 1996 cover for Parker Brothers board game Clue, and over 30 U.S. postage stamps, including the 2004 John Wayne stamp and the 2007 James Stewart stamp.

Struzan's cover art for Action Comics #800 (April 2003), with a self-portrait seen at the lower left

Struzan once lamented the decline of traditional art in an e-mail exchange:

I love the texture of paint made of colored earth, of oil from the trees and of canvas and paper. I love the expression of paint from a brush or a hand smearing charcoal, the dripping of paint and moisture of water, the smell of the materials. I delight in the changeable nature of a painting with new morning light or in the afternoon when the sun turns a painting orange or by firelight at night. I love to see it, hold it, touch it, smell it, and create it. My gift is to share my life by allowing others to see into my heart and spirit through such tangible, comprehensible and familiar means. The paint is part of the expression.

In 1999, in an exhibit entitled Drew: Art of the Cinema, Struzan had over 65 pieces of his artwork presented at the Norman Rockwell Museum in Stockbridge, Massachusetts.

For the release of Star Wars: Episode I – The Phantom Menace, George Lucas dictated that, contractually, Struzan's poster was the only art the foreign distributors could use, and other than the text, it could not be modified in any way.

Director Frank Darabont reportedly based the lead character of David Drayton from The Mist on Struzan. The film includes a nod to Stephen King's The Dark Tower series, with Drayton seen painting an image based on the books in the opening scene. The artwork was created by Struzan, whose work also appears in the form of posters for films like The Shawshank Redemption and The Green Mile.

In 2008, Struzan in collaboration with his art director son, Christian, created the official poster for the 80th Academy Awards.

After completing the extensive artwork required for the campaign of Indiana Jones and the Kingdom of the Crystal Skull, Struzan announced his retirement on September 3, 2008.

A February 2009 exhibit entitled Drew Struzan: An Artist's Vision at Gallery Nucleus in Alhambra, California, presented select pieces of the artist's for the first public exhibit in 10 years.

=== 2010s: Later career ===
Struzan came out of retirement in 2012 to do a collaboration with Mondo for a cover of Stephen King's The Dark Tower. The resulting poster was based on the version created by Struzan originally as an easter egg for the 2007 adaptation of The Mist.

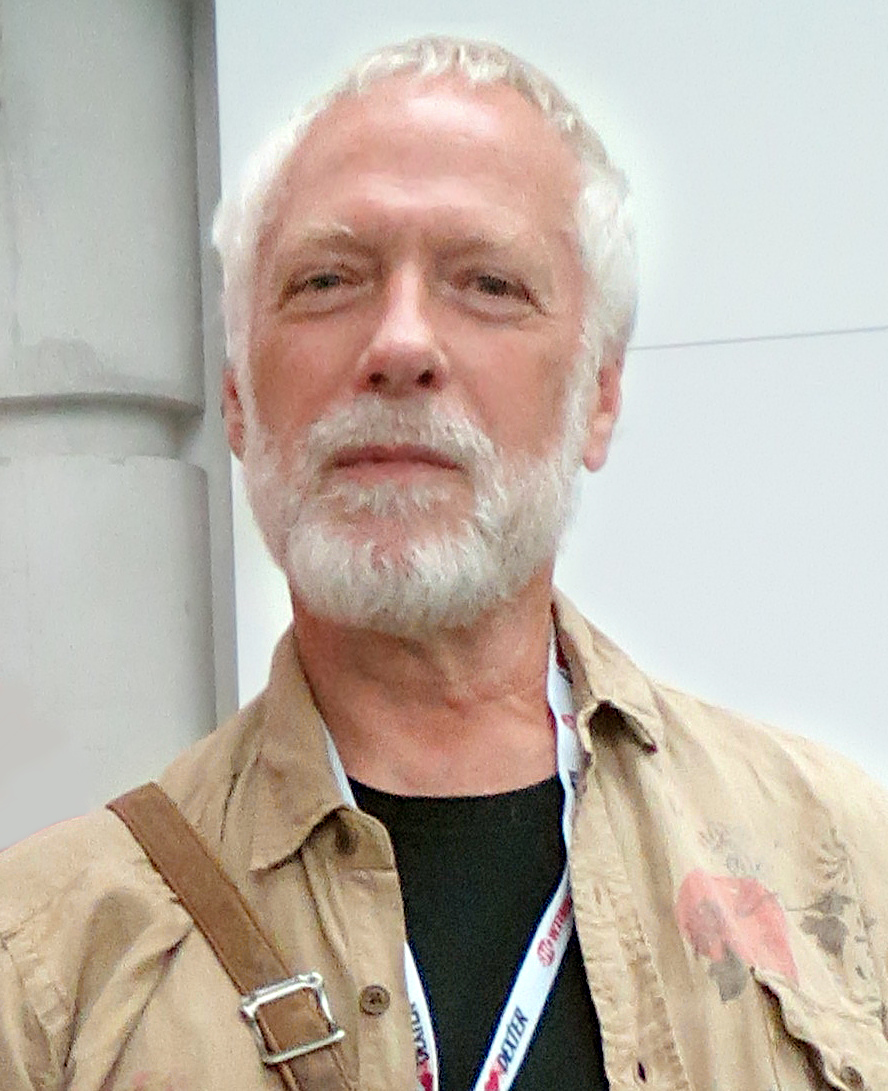
Struzan in 2013

The 2013 documentary Drew: The Man Behind the Poster, directed by Erik Sharkey, examines Struzan's life and work, and features interviews with filmmakers and actors involved with films for which Struzan has done poster work, including Frank Darabont, Harrison Ford, George Lucas, Michael J. Fox, Steve Guttenberg, Guillermo del Toro, Steven Spielberg and Thomas Jane. The film was scored by award-winning composer Ryan Shore.

Struzan came out of retirement again to design posters for the 2015 documentary Batkid Begins: The Wish Heard Around The World and Star Wars: The Force Awakens.

In December 2017, to celebrate Struzan's 70th birthday, Robert Townson, Varèse Sarabande and the Golden State Pops Orchestra produced the tribute The Magnificent Movie Poster World of Drew Struzan – live in concert which featured Struzan's artwork displayed to the live orchestral performance of associated film music. The performance included composers Thomas Newman, John Debney, Brian Tyler, Marco Beltrami, Robert Folk, and Michael Kosarin, as guest conductors.

In January 2019, for the release of How to Train Your Dragon: The Hidden World Struzan came out of retirement again to create three separate posters for the How to Train Your Dragon film trilogy. This series followed the exclusive Comic-Con poster Struzan did for the release of How to Train Your Dragon 2 in 2013.

Published in 2019, Struzan illustrated the book A Bloody Business ISBN 978-1785657702 about prohibition and organized crime, written by his wife Dylan Struzan.

== Creative process ==
To create his finished work projects, Struzan started by sketching out drawings on gessoed illustration board, then tinting the draftsmanship with airbrushed acrylic paint, finishing up the highlights and other details with colored pencils and more airbrush if needed. The gessoed foundation allows Struzan the luxury of being able to accommodate any requested changes to the work. Preferring to work on a 1 to 1 scale, Struzan's one-sheet work would be approximately 27 x 40 inches, the size of a printed movie poster. Working from reference photographs and live models, Struzan has been known at times to include depictions of himself, family members, and friends in his work. He is known for working very quickly, as it typically takes him a week to two weeks to finish a painting. With the theatrical release of the Star Wars special editions, Struzan created the three-panel triptych within the limited four-week deadline. The poster artwork for John Carpenter's 1982 remake of The Thing was created overnight, Struzan having received that assignment less than a day before the finished poster was needed.

== Personal life ==
Working from a backyard studio, Struzan lived in California with his wife, Dylan. He had a son named Christian, and after retiring from full-time work in 2008 spent much of his time caring for his grandchildren.

=== Illness and death ===
In March 2025, Struzan's wife revealed he had been living with Alzheimer's disease for several years, saying that his illness had progressed to the point where he was "fighting for his life" and could no longer paint or sign things for fans.

Struzan died at his home in Pasadena, California, on October 13, 2025, at the age of 78.

== Published collections ==
- Drew Struzan: Oeuvre ISBN 0-9732786-7-6 – a hardbound edition of Struzan's works, ranging from movie posters to album and book covers. Due to financial problems with the publisher, Dreamwave, Struzan lost a considerable amount of personally invested money on this volume.
- The Art of Drew Struzan – Star Wars Portfolio ISBN 0-9672928-0-8
- The Movie Posters of Drew Struzan ISBN 0-7624-2083-9

== Awards ==
- 2002 Saturn Award
- 2010 Inkpot Award
- 2014 Saul Bass Award
- 2015 Art Center College of Design Alumni Lifetime Achievement Award
- 2016 Sergio Award for Lifetime Achievement from the Comic Art Professional Society (CAPS)
- 2020 Society of Illustrators Hall of Fame

== See also ==
- Category:Albums with cover art by Drew Struzan
