= Fanboy (comics) =

- Cover to Fanboy #1. Art by Sergio Aragonés and Jerry Ordway.

Publication information
- Publisher: DC Comics
- Schedule: Monthly
- Format: Limited series
- Publication date: March–August 1999
- No. of issues: 6

Creative team
- Written by: Mark Evanier
- Artist: Sergio Aragonés

Fanboy is the title of a six issue comic book miniseries by Mark Evanier and Sergio Aragonés which was published by DC Comics in 1999.

== Series overview ==
Fanboy is the story of Finster, a rabid comic book fan and comic book store employee who dreams of becoming a professional comic book artist. Finster's daydreams are of classic comic book heroes, with himself inserted as a sidekick. While Finster's everyday activities are illustrated by Aragonés, his daydreams are illustrated by Jerry Ordway, Frank Miller, Gil Kane, Neal Adams, Dick Sprang, Bill Sienkiewicz, Brent Anderson, Russ Heath, Joe Kubert, Marie Severin, Brian Bolland, Jim Mooney, Joe Giella, Bruce Timm, Kevin Nowlan, Wendy Pini, Jordi Bernet, Phil Jiminez, Bernie Wrightson, Matt Haley, Tom Simmons, Will Blyberg, Dave Gibbons, Steve Rude, Dick Giordano, Mike Grell and Dan Spiegle. The covers also featured Finster added into homages to classic comic book covers.

FANBOY Magazine was also a 4-issue publication in 1993.

== Plot ==
Finster, the protagonist, is a teenager, who works in a comic shop, while also being an artist. He daydreams about, and has had real, adventures. He usually mixes his own life with Fantasy, and is always talking to the reader.

== Publication history ==
The original six issue mini-series was published by DC Comics from March to August 1999. The series was collected into a trade paperback first published in 2001 (ISBN 1563897245).
