= Groo the Wanderer =

- Groo the Wanderer cover page, issue #1 (Marvel).

Publication information
- Publisher: Pacific Comics; Eclipse Comics; Epic/Marvel Comics; Image Comics; Dark Horse Comics
- First appearance: Destroyer Duck #1 (May 1982)
- Created by: Sergio Aragonés

In-story information
- Alter ego: Groo
- Notable aliases: Prince of Chichester
- Abilities: Master swordsman

Groo the Wanderer is a fantasy comedy comic book character created by Sergio Aragonés. His stories are written and drawn by Aragonés, dialogued and edited by Mark Evanier, lettered by Stan Sakai and colored by Tom Luth. Over the years, Groo has been published by Pacific Comics, Eclipse Comics (one special issue), Marvel Comics (under its Epic imprint), Image Comics and Dark Horse Comics.

Groo was among the first widely successful creator-owned comics creations, one of the few successful humorous series in the United States (outside Archie Comics), and is one of the longest-running collaborations in comic book history. In 2011, IGN ranked Groo 100th in the "Top 100 comic books heroes".

== The characters ==
Groo (the epithet "the Wanderer" is informal and rarely mentioned within the stories) first appeared as a parody of the brutal sword and sorcery heroes that were popular at the time of his creation in the 1970s, especially Conan the Barbarian as presented in Marvel Comics. Groo is a large-nosed buffoon of unsurpassed stupidity who constantly misunderstands his surroundings. Possessed of superlative skills in swordsmanship (the only task at which he is remotely competent, apart from his knack for creating musical instruments), he delights in combat but otherwise is a peaceable and honest fellow who tries to make his way through life as a mercenary or by working odd jobs. He is incredibly accident prone, and despite generally good intentions causes mass destruction wherever he goes. Most of his adventures end with him either oblivious to the mayhem he has wrought or fleeing an angry mob. His penchant for destruction has become so widely known that just the news of Groo approaching is sometimes enough to cause chaos among the population. Groo occasionally meets with respect and good fortune, but it does not last. Businesses, towns, civilizations, and cultures have all been unwittingly destroyed by Groo. Such is Groo's incompetence that so much as his stepping onto a ship can cause it to sink.

Groo has slain entire armies with nothing more than his swords, which are a pair of katanas. Groo loves these frays, as he calls them, and often charges into the melee with a cry of "Now Groo does what Groo does best!" He is indiscriminate in the use of his battle skills, usually leaping into the bloodshed before attempting to ascertain the reasons for the fight, or even who is on what side. Even when Groo does join battle intending to fight for a particular side, he is prone to forget which side he is on or be tricked into fighting his unfortunate allies, often causing him to utter "Did I err?" in confusion once everybody is dead.

The following is a sample of the thousands of characters Groo has encountered:

- Captain Ahax, who has, over time with the loss of many vessels under his command, become wise to Groo's effect on ships, although he does not know about Rufferto's ability to restrain it.
- Arba and Dakarba, a pair of witches who have suffered much trying to take advantage of Groo. They have repeatedly been stripped of their powers because of him. Their names, when put together, spell "abra-kadabra" backwards.
- Arcadio, a handsome warrior with an especially pronounced chin, who is considered the greatest hero of his time, especially by himself. He has often enlisted Groo as his "lackey", and while Groo has succeeded in his quests time and again, Arcadio always gets the credit.
- Chakaal, a beautiful female warrior, and Groo's equal in swordplay. Chakaal is also strong, noble, and wise, and Groo is madly in love with her. She is as well known as a hero and skilled warrior as Groo is for being a walking disaster, and travels the land seeking people in need of her help. Though she respects Groo's prowess as a warrior, Chakaal is all too aware of his incompetence in other areas, as well as his general stupidity and lack of social graces, and finds Groo at best tolerable when she is in need of his sword, and contemptible otherwise. Romantically speaking, she considers his idiotic advances repulsive, and does her best to ignore them, though she is not above using Groo's feelings for her to convince him to help her in her quests, and will often use Groo as a decoy or sacrificial lamb.
- Granny Groo, Groo's gypsy grandmother. Granny Groo often tries to use her grandson to aid her in her moneymaking schemes, but invariably ends up giving him a good spanking when he fails.
- Grativo the Wizard, who often punishes Arba and Dakarba for their failures.
- Grooella, Groo's sister. While she greatly resembles her brother, the two of them are totally different: Grooella is a queen. However, her occasional reliance on her brother for aid has spelled disaster every time, and she despises him. Grooella had long, beautiful blond hair as a child, but one of Groo's "games" (which nearly always ended in the injury of at least one other child) damaged it so that it became black and frizzy. The Sage developed a one-time-only formula to restore her hair, but Groo "erred" again and rendered the damage permanent.
- The Minstrel, a singing jester who speaks exclusively in rhyming couplets. He often likes to sing of Groo's deeds, but Groo seldom appreciates his unflattering descriptions of his bungling. An unusual aspect of the Minstrel is that the ornately carved head of his lute differs in every panel in which it appears. The Minstrel seldom appeared in later issues, due to the difficulty of creating his dialogue: "Mark takes a stance, and if by chance / The Minstrel doesn't vanish / Then Mark will go, and Sergio / can write this stuff in Spanish". He has since returned to being a regular character, especially after Groo inadvertently reunited him with his hitherto unknown young daughter, Kayli, who is now his constant companion.
- Pal and Drumm, two con men. The diminutive Pal is always looking for easy money, but his hulking partner Drumm is not very bright. Their dealings with Groo have often left them in trouble with the people they were scamming. Their names are a play on palindrome.
- Pipil Khan, a short and short-tempered conqueror who speaks like Elmer Fudd. He correctly views Groo as the cause of many of his later attempts at conquest ending in disaster, but having never met the man personally, imagines Groo to be a far more imposing figure than he actually is. When he finally meets the real man who's haunted the latter years of his life, the shock kills him.
- Rufferto, Groo's dog and inseparable companion. Rufferto ran away from his boring life as a spoiled and pampered royal pet to seek adventure, and endeared himself to Groo. In Rufferto's eyes, Groo is a hero and a tactical genius. Initially, Groo viewed Rufferto as a potential meal but eventually came to regard him as his faithful companion. Groo can also safely board a ship in Rufferto's presence. His collar is immensely valuable.
- The Sage, a wise, old man who is usually never far from Groo. The Sage often attempts to give Groo sound advice, but Groo's stupidity means that the advice is misinterpreted and only makes situations worse. The Sage is never without his dog Mulch. The Sage has known Groo since childhood and often tells his tales for all who are willing to listen. Apart from Rufferto, the Sage is the only character in the Grooniverse who genuinely counts Groo as a friend.
- Taranto, formerly a general, and a friend of Groo, turned bandit leader. He became Groo's enemy when he was hired to kill Groo. He has since tried to exploit Groo in his schemes, sometimes successfully, but often being ruined. Groo can never remember whether he is friends with Taranto, or if Taranto wants to kill him. He was one of the first recurring characters to appear.
- Weaver and Scribe, a successful author and his amanuensis, who look suspiciously like Groo's own Evanier and Sakai. The Scribe never speaks.
- The Witch of Kaan, an eccentric old hag who always has a potion ready for anybody who visits her.

== The setting ==
Groo's adventures take place in an environment that generally resembles Medieval Europe, although his travels have also taken him to places that resemble Africa, Indonesia, Japan, the Middle East, and elsewhere. In addition to regular flora and fauna, dragons and other legendary creatures occasionally appear, and several cultures use dinosaur-like creatures as beasts of burden. Over the years, Groo has also encountered several "non-human" cultures such as the Kalelis and the Drazil. The currency in Groo's world is usually the Kopin.

Although many technologies and peoples in Groo appear ancient, more modern innovations such as the printing press can be found as well.

== The creators ==
Groo is initially plotted and drawn by Sergio Aragonés, and Mark Evanier then writes the dialog. Sakai then does the lettering, after which Aragonés does the final artwork, including the word balloons. Finally, Luth does the coloring.

Evanier also answers the letters page, something he takes special pride in, since the practice in mainstream comics is to pass this task off to low-level assistants, something he did not know when his own letters as a teenage fan were published. He claims that no one knows what he does. His official credit, during the Marvel/Epic run, was usually a polysyllabic title that changed every issue (examples from the first eight issues of volume 2: Interpreter, Interlocutor, Cryptographer, Amanuensis, Construer, Verbalizer, Articulator, Scholiast). His actual function, as revealed at the end of issue #6 of volume 2, was to interpret Aragones's broken English storytelling to write the dialog.

Caricatures of Aragonés, Evanier, Sakai, and Luth often appear as background characters within the stories, sometimes with family members. Evanier and Sakai are also the role models for the characters Weaver and Scribe.

Rufferto was based on Aragonés's own dog named Rufferto, who is actually more mottled than spotted.

== Rufferto one-page stories ==
Starting with issue #87 of Marvel's ongoing Groo series, issues of Groo ended with a wordless one-page gag involving Groo's dog, Rufferto. When the Groo comic went to Image and Dark Horse comics, these one-page Rufferto stories continued. In all, 93 of these Rufferto one page stories were printed.

In one instance (Groo #9 from Image Comics), Rufferto's brother Arfetto replaced Rufferto as the star of the backup story.

== Publication history ==
Aragonés created the character of Groo in the late 1970s. At that time no comic book company would allow creators to retain the rights to their characters, and Aragonés did not wish to surrender those rights. In 1981, a comic book, Destroyer Duck #1, was published by Eclipse Comics as a benefit to raise money for a legal battle over creator rights; a four-page story contributed by Aragonés featured Groo's first published appearance. A few months later, Groo appeared in a two-page preview ad and the back cover art in Starslayer #4, published by Pacific Comics. The second Groo story appearance was in a five-page backup story in Starslayer #5.

In 1982, Pacific Comics began publishing Groo the Wanderer as a regular series. Pacific faced various financial difficulties and was only able to publish eight issues of the title. With Pacific unable to publish new material, a one-shot issue of material that was originally written for them (titled the Groo Special) was instead published by Eclipse. When Groo was published by Pacific, he was not portrayed as a bumbling idiot. In fact, one issue had him use his brains to create sophisticated traps and his speech was similar to Conan the Barbarian's.

Aragonés and Evanier eventually negotiated a deal with Epic Comics, an imprint of Marvel Comics, for that company to take care of publication while preserving creator rights. This resulted in the longest run of Groo the Wanderer with 120 issues. In 1994, with Marvel facing financial difficulties, the title switched to Image Comics and was retitled Groo. In the first issue Groo remarks "the marvels of the world are but images before me". When Image in turn faced legal problems after publishing twelve issues, the title switched to Dark Horse Comics in 1998. Dark Horse did not publish the title as a regular series, but periodically released new material and reprints as miniseries and collections.

In 1997, a card game based on the comic, Groo: The Game, was published.

At the 2007 WonderCon, the creators revealed that since 2005 they had been trying to produce a Groo/Conan crossover (both titles being then published by Dark Horse). The project was postponed a number of times; although two issues had been completed by the spring of 2011, the series was further delayed because of a backache suffered by Aragonés. The book finally saw print in July 2014, with Aragonés and writer Mark Evanier working with artist Thomas Yeates, who drew the Conan portions of the book.

In December 2025, Dark Horse Comics announced a four-issue miniseries titled Groo: The Prophecy, scheduled to begin publication on April 1, 2026.

== Similar characters ==
The character of the Groosalugg in the TV series Angel is generally called "Groo" by other characters, and is a somewhat naïve wandering barbarian hero who is a highly skilled swordsman.

In Norway, the magazine Pyton once parodied the comic by placing the Norwegian Prime Minister Gro Harlem Brundtland in the role of Groo, as a pun on her name.

Also in Norway, when the local version of Mad magazine ran a parody of Ronia, the Robber's Daughter, the "gray dwarves" pestering Ronia had become "Groo dwarves".

== Bibliography ==
=== Original publications ===
- Vol I — Pacific (December 1982 – April 1984)
  - Sergio Aragonés' Groo the Wanderer #1–8
- One shot intermediate printing — Eclipse (October 1984)
  - Sergio Aragonés' Groo the Wanderer Special #1
- Vol II — Epic/Marvel
  - Sergio Aragonés' Groo the Wanderer #1–120 (March 1985 – January 1995)
  - The Death of Groo (graphic novel, November 1987)
  - The Life of Groo (graphic novel, April 1993)
- Vol III — Image (December 1994 – November 1995)
  - Sergio Aragonés' Groo #1–12
- Vol IV — Dark Horse (Jan. 1998–present)
  - Sergio Aragonés' Groo #1–4 (January 1998 – April 1998 miniseries)
  - Sergio Aragonés' Groo and Rufferto #1–4 (December 1998 – March 1999 miniseries)
  - Sergio Aragonés' Groo: Mightier than the Sword #1–4 (January 2000 – April 2000 miniseries)
  - Sergio Aragonés' Groo: Death & Taxes #1–4 (December 2001 – April 2002 miniseries)
  - Sergio Aragonés' Groo: 25th Anniversary Special (August 2007, one-shot)
  - Sergio Aragonés' Groo: Hell on Earth #1–4 (November 2007 – April 2008 miniseries)
  - Sergio Aragonés' Groo: The Hogs of Horder #1–4 (October 2009 – March 2010 miniseries)
  - Sergio Aragonés' Groo vs. Conan #1–4 (July – October 2014 crossover miniseries with Aragonés drawing Groo and Thomas Yeates drawing Conan)
  - Sergio Aragonés' Groo: Friends and Foes #1–12 (January – December 2015 maxiseries)
  - Sergio Aragonés' Groo: Fray of the Gods #1–4 (July – October 2016 miniseries)
  - Sergio Aragonés' Groo: Play of the Gods #1–4 (July – October 2017 miniseries)
  - Sergio Aragonés' Groo meets Tarzan #1–4 (July – November 2021 miniseries)
  - Sergio Aragonés' Groo: Gods Against Groo #1–4 (December 2022 – March 2023 miniseries)
  - Sergio Aragonés' Groo: In the Wild #1–4 (July – November 2023 miniseries)
  - Sergio Aragonés' Groo: Minstrel Melodies #1–4 (September – December 2024 miniseries)
  - Sergio Aragonés' Groo: The Prophecy #1–4 (April – October 2026 miniseries)
- Special appearances
  - Destroyer Duck #1 Eclipse (February 1982)
  - Starslayer #5 Pacific (November 1982)
  - Epic Illustrated #27 Epic/Marvel (December 1984)
  - Wizard #78 Wizard Press (February 1998)
  - Dark Horse Presents Annual 1999 Dark Horse (August 1999)
  - Dark Horse Extra #42 Dark Horse (December 2001)
  - Dark Horse Presents #7–9 Dark Horse (February – April 2015)
  - Comics For Ukraine: Sunflower Seeds Zoop/IDW (one-shot, 2023)

=== Reprints ===
- The Death of Groo (Epic/Marvel 1990—second & third printings)
- The Life of Groo (Graphitti Designs 1995—second printing)

=== Reprint collections ===
Epic/Marvel

- The Groo Chronicles (Six Prestige Format books, Epic, 1989–1990, collecting the Pacific and Eclipse series)
- The Groo Adventurer (Epic, 1990; collecting Epic/Marvel issues #1–4)
- The Groo Bazaar (Epic, 1992; collecting Epic/Marvel issues #5–8)
- The Groo Carnival (Epic, 1992; collecting Epic/Marvel issues #9–12)
- The Groo Dynasty (Epic, 1992; collecting Epic/Marvel issues #13–16)
- The Groo Exposé (Epic, 1993; collecting Epic/Marvel issues #17–20)
- The Groo Festival (Epic, 1993; collecting Epic/Marvel issues #21–24)
- The Groo Garden (Epic, 1994; collecting Epic/Marvel issues #25–28)

Dark Horse

- The Groo Houndbook (Dark Horse, 1999; collecting Epic/Marvel issues #29–32)
- The Groo Inferno (Dark Horse, 1999; collecting Epic/Marvel issues #33–36)
- The Groo Jamboree (Dark Horse, 2000; collecting Epic/Marvel issues #37–40)
- The Groo Kingdom (Dark Horse, 2001; collecting Epic/Marvel issues #41, 42, 43, 46)
- The Groo Library (Dark Horse, 2001; collecting Epic/Marvel issues #44, 45, 47, 49)
- The Groo Maiden (Dark Horse, 2002; collecting Epic/Marvel issues #50–53)
- The Groo Nursery (Dark Horse, 2002; collecting Epic/Marvel issues #54, 55, 56, 48)
- The Groo Odyssey (Dark Horse, 2003; collecting Epic/Marvel issues #57–60)
- Groo: The Most Intelligent Man in the World (1998; collecting the 1998 four-issue comic book series Sergio Aragonés' Groo)
- Groo & Rufferto (2000; collecting the 1999 four-issue comic book series)
- Groo: Mightier than the Sword (2002; collecting the 2000 four-issue comic book series)
- Groo: Death and Taxes (2003; collecting the 2002 four-issue comic book series)
- Groo: Hell on Earth (2008; collecting the 2007–2008 four-issue comic book series)
- Groo: The Hogs of Horder (2010; collecting the 2009–2010 four-issue comic book series)
- Groo vs. Conan (2015; collecting the 2014 four-issue comic book series)
- Groo: Friends and Foes Vol 1 (2015; collecting issues #1–4 of the twelve-issue comic book series)
- Groo: Friends and Foes Vol 2 (2016; collecting issues #5–8 of the twelve-issue comic book series)
- Groo: Friends and Foes Vol 3 (2016; collecting issues #9–12 of the twelve-issue comic book series)
- Groo: Friends and Foes (hardcover) (2017; collecting the 2015–2016 twelve-issue comic book series)
- Groo: Fray of the Gods (2017; collecting the 2016 four-issue comic book series)
- Groo: Play of the Gods (2018; collecting the 2017 four-issue comic book series)
- Groo meets Tarzan (2022; collecting the 2021 four-issue comic book series)
- Groo: Gods Against Groo (2023; collecting the 2022 four-issue comic book series)
- Groo: In the Wild (2024; collecting the 2023 four-issue comic book series)
- Groo: Minstrel Melodies (2025; collecting the 2024 four-issue comic book series)

Others

- The Groo Chronicles (hardcover limited to 1,500 printings, collecting The Groo Chronicles)
- The Life & Death of Groo (flip hardcover limited to 1,000 printings, collecting The Life of Groo and The Death of Groo)
- Sergio Aragonés' Groo the Wanderer: Artist's Edition (IDW, July 2012; 12" × 17" hardcover B&W, collecting the four-issue story "Wager of the Gods" Epic/Marvel issues #96–99) also published in a limited edition (250 copies) with variant cover

== Awards and nominations ==
Sergio Aragonés received the National Cartoonist Society Reuben Award for 1996 for his work on Groo and Mad magazine. In 2009, Groo: Hell on Earth was nominated for the Eisner Award for Best Limited Series.

The comic protagonist of the same name has also received positive reviews. Wizard ranked him as the 135th-greatest comic book character of all time, while IGN ranked Groo as the 100th-greatest comic book hero of all time stating that "while he may not be the brightest bulb on the battlefield, Groo is an earnest and kind-hearted adventurer whose travels are never short on laughs and adventure".
