= Kirby: King of Comics =

2008 book by Mark Evanier

- Author: Mark Evanier
- Language: English
- Subject: Biography of Jack Kirby
- Published: 2008 (Abrams Books)
- Publication place: United States
- Pages: 224
- ISBN: 978-0-8109-9447-8

Kirby: King of Comics is a 2008 biography of Jack Kirby written by Mark Evanier. The book won various awards including a 2009 Eisner Award for Best Comics-Related Book. While it was met with mixed reception from critics, various publications recommend it to comic fans. It was published by the art book publisher Abrams Books, it is extensively illustrated with Kirby's artwork, including original art comic pages with production notes in blue ink and was re-released in 2017.

It tells the story of Jack Kirby's life and his creative process. The book presents these biographical details informally, with jokes occasionally thrown in.

== Summary ==
The book contains original artwork made by Kirby, and features an introduction written by English writer Neil Gaiman.

Kirby was born into a poor immigrant family and begun to fantasize about becoming an artist. Kirby started breaking into the industry with his first comic, Street Code. He was then hired by Horace T. Elmo. Kirby went on to meet Joe Simon. The pair grew closer and worked as a creative duo. They eventually had a falling out, causing Kirby to struggle in selling his work without Simon.

Kirby then joined Atlas Comics (later known as Marvel Comics) and created several of the company's flagship characters along with collaborator Stan Lee. Kirby eventually grew dissatisfied with Marvel, and resigned following unsuccessful contract negotiations. He joined Marvel's biggest competitor, DC Comics. At DC, he started writing more complex stories, including his series about the New Gods and Mister Miracle. When DC asked Kirby to take over an existing book, he decided to work on Superman's Pal Jimmy Olsen, their worst-performing series at the time.

Kirby eventually grew tired of the comic book industry as a whole. After being asked to write the 1970s Fantastic Four cartoon, he temporarily stopped drawing comics. Upon his return to comics, he started writing indie comics for various companies. He eventually returned to DC. Jenette Kahn offered Kirby royalties and allowed Kirby to continue writing odd and abstract comics. His works from this period under performed in sales. Marvel started adapting Kirby's work, leading to his frustration with the company. He threatened to sue Marvel. Following pressure from various creatives, the company returned various drawings to him, and gave him an increased royalty amount.

Kirby suffered multiple health problems before dying of heart failure. Following his death, Marvel granted a modest pension to his widow, Roz, until her own death.

== Release ==
Kirby: King of Comics was published in 2008 by Abrams Books. After the book's release Mark Evanier attended various fan conventions to promote it. He also attended the event "Live at Kirby Plaza" in London, England at the Institute of Contemporary Arts where he discussed Kirby: King of Comics. At the Jack Kirby panel at the 2008 WonderCon, Evanier teased that a sequel was in development and that it would be a "proper biography".

In 2017, to celebrate Jack Kirby's 100th birthday, (Note: Kirby died in 1994.) Abrams Books issued a reprint of the book with additional content added. Including a chapter focused on disputes between Jack Kirby and the Walt Disney Company and additional illustrations. During an interview with Comic Book Resources to celebrate the nine-year anniversary of the book, Evanier confirmed that he was still working on the biography.

== Development ==
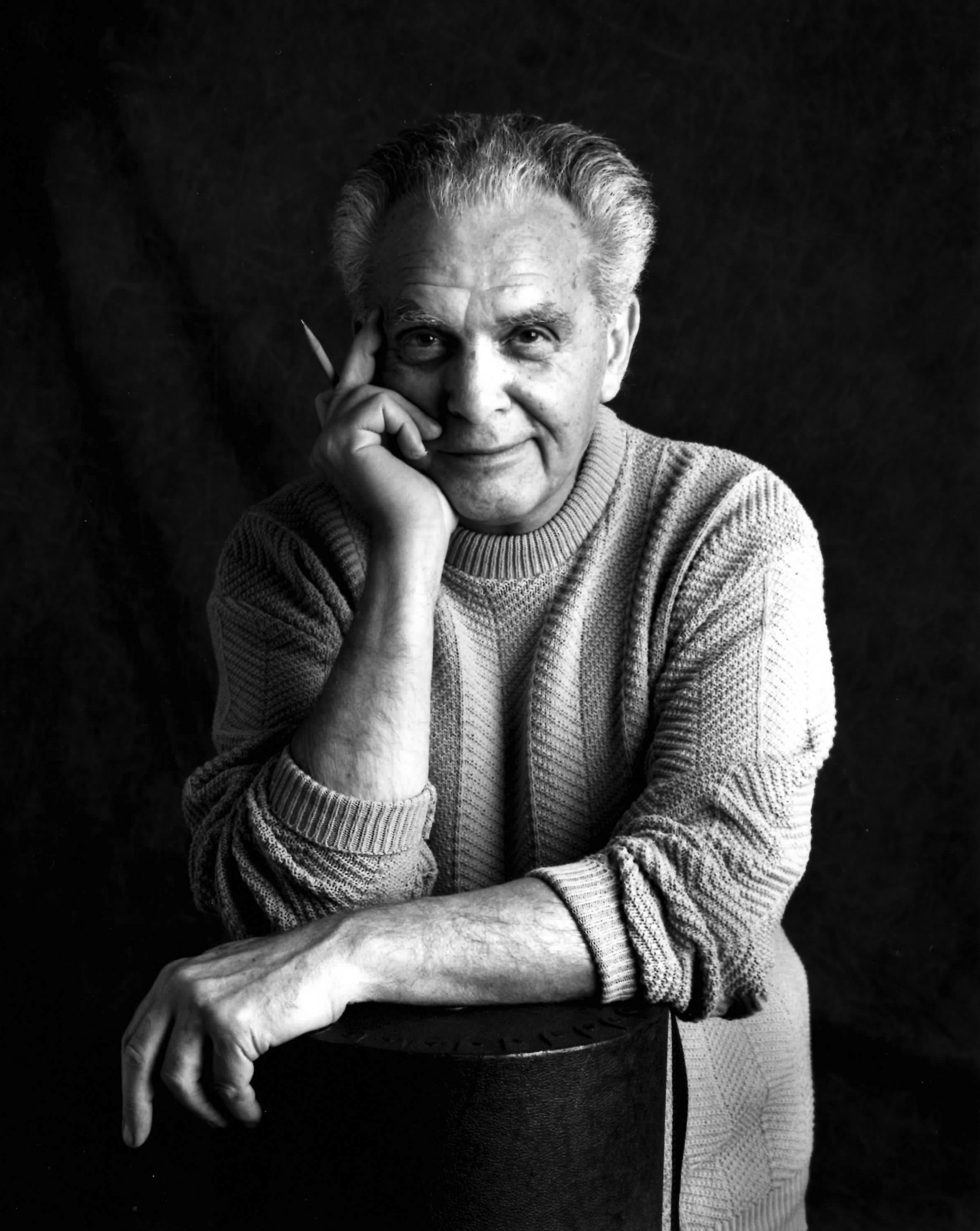
Jack Kirby, the subject of the biography

Mark Evanier had been known to be working on the book for a while prior to its release. In 2004, the book's word count was around 250,000 words, though it was later split into two volumes, of which this book is the only one published as of 2024. Upon its completion, Evanier described the book as "the first and only book on Jack 'the King' Kirby", ignoring Ronin Ro's earlier Tales to Astonish: Jack Kirby, Stan Lee and the American Comic Book Revolution from 2004. Evanier worked for Kirby and was a friend of his, giving him additional insight while writing the book.

Evanier collected art for the book from various comic creators and collectors, and from the family of Jack Kirby. Kirby's family re-obtained the art following a public campaign to have them returned and legal threats from Kirby.

== Reception ==
Kirby: King of Comics was met with mixed reviews from critics. Writing for The Austin Chronicle, Rick Claw praised the book on how it was able to tell Kirby's story in a both heartfelt and entertaining way. He noted how the art in the book was well integrated with the text. Publishers Weekly gave the book a generally positive review, praising the tone and narrative, while criticizing the lack of deep analysis.

Writing for KARK-TV, Sian Babish described the book as being "masterfully written", and felt that Marvel fans would enjoy reading the book and urged them to buy it. David Bianculli of NPR also recommended the book. Writing for The Guardian, Michael Faber was far more negative on Kirby: King of Comics. Faber felt that the book felt "empty" and "disjointed" and criticized the formatting and overall tone of the book.

In 2009, the book won multiple awards, including an Eisner Award for "Best Comics-Related Book". It also won two Harvey Awards one for "Best Biographical, Historical, or Journalistic Presentation" along with a special award for "Excellence in Presentation".
