= Dan Spiegle =

American comics artist and cartoonist

- Born: December 10, 1920 Cosmopolis, Washington, U.S.
- Died: January 28, 2017 (aged 96)
- Area: Artist
- Notable works: Hopalong Cassidy; Scooby-Doo; Nemesis; Blackhawk; Crossfire; Maverick
- Awards: Inkpot Award, 1983

Dan Spiegle (December 10, 1920 – January 28, 2017) was an American comics artist and cartoonist best known for comics based on movie and television characters across a variety of companies, including Dell Comics, DC Comics, and Marvel Comics.

== Biography ==
=== Early life and career ===
Dan Spiegle was born in Cosmopolis, Washington, in 1920, and raised there and in Honolulu, Hawaii, and northern California. After high school, Spiegle "found myself in the Navy", where he worked on the base newspaper and on insignias for airplanes. Following his discharge in 1946, Spiegle enrolled at the Chouinard Art Institute of Los Angeles on the G.I. Bill.

Spiegle began his professional cartoonist career in 1949 drawing the comic strip Hopalong Cassidy for the Mirror Enterprises Syndicate. He continued to draw this strip after it was bought out by King Features in 1951, until it was cancelled in 1955.

=== Dell and Gold Key Comics ===
His earliest confirmed work in comic books is penciling and inking a one-page advertisement for Wheaties breakfast cereal, "Preacher Roe Sparks in Pitching Duel", in Walt Disney's Comics and Stories #144 (cover-dated Sept. 1952). His first story in the medium was the 16-page Annie Oakley Western story "The Bushwacker", by an unknown writer, in Dell Comics' Annie Oakley and Tagg #7 (June 1956). Through the remainder of the decade he drew primarily Western stories for such Dell titles as Four Color, Rex Allen, Queen of the West Dale Evans, and others, as well as that publisher's Four Color feature "Spin and Marty", based on the segment from the Walt Disney TV program The Mickey Mouse Club. In 1959, he started drawing Four Color stories for such licensed TV series features Colt .45, Maverick, The Rifleman, Rawhide, and Lawman, later adding the Maverick and Lawman spinoff comic books, among others. He soon expanded to drawing Four Color features of TV series ranging from The Untouchables to Sea Hunt.

Spiegle began work on Maverick comics before any publicity photographs of series star James Garner were available, so he met the actor on the set and the resultant drawings of Garner in the subsequent comics are eerily exact. In 1972, Spiegle explained in an interview:

I would say my favorite was Maverick, which ran about three years — fairly successful, considering the run of other Western strips published then. I was assigned this strip even before they had stills available for the show, so I was sent down to Warner Bros. to see it in production — where I met James Garner, which is perhaps the reason I enjoyed it so much. Having met the star, I was extra careful to make the drawings I did look as parallel to the real person as possible. I put my all into that strip, having fun all the way.

Spiegle continued on these titles as licensor Western Publishing Company moved away from its business partner Dell to publish comics itself under its Gold Key Comics imprint. Through the 1960s, Spiegle worked on Space Family Robinson, which made its debut three years before TV's Lost in Space, The Green Hornet, and The Invaders, as well as such titles as Korak, Son of Tarzan, Brothers of the Spear, and many of Gold Key's mystery/occult titles. In 1966, at the height of popularity of the James Bond film series, Spiegle provided naturalistic backgrounds and human characters while cartoon animal artist Paul Murry drew Mickey Mouse and Goofy for the short-lived Mickey Mouse Super Secret Agent. As comic-book historian Scott Shaw notes, "What's even weirder about these stories is that in them, none of the 'real' human characters seem to notice anything remotely unusual about occupying space with a three-foot-tall talking cartoon mouse!" Spiegle and writer Donald F. Glut co-created the Doctor Spektor character in Mystery Comics Digest #5 (July 1972). Spiegle drew the comic book adaptation of the 1979 Walt Disney Pictures feature film The Black Hole.

=== Later comics career ===
In addition to his naturalistic work adapting live-action television, Spiegle also handled more cartoony material such as Gold Key's Saturday-morning TV animation title, Hanna-Barbera Scooby-Doo... Where Are You!, starting with issue #16 (Feb. 1973). Five issues later marked his first teaming with writer Mark Evanier, with whom he continued to the final Gold Key issue, #30 (Feb. 1975). The two worked on the character again from 1977 to 1979 when Marvel Comics licensed the property, doing all nine issues of Scooby-Doo, and reprised their team-up in 1996 when Archie Comics acquired the Scooby-Doo license.

Spiegle later moved to DC Comics, and worked on many of their features, such as Unknown Soldier, Tomahawk, Jonah Hex, and Teen Titans Spotlight until the early 1990s. His most notable work was the "Nemesis" backup series in The Brave and the Bold with writer Cary Burkett, and on Blackhawk with Mark Evanier. He and writer Bob Rozakis created the character Mister E in Secrets of Haunted House #31 (Dec. 1980).

Although the character Crossfire was created by Mark Evanier and Will Meugniot in DNAgents published by Eclipse Comics, Spiegle penciled and inked every issue of the comic book Crossfire, as well as Crossfire and Rainbow, and Whodunnit?, which featured Crossfire. Evanier and Spiegle also did all five issues of Hollywood Superstars for Marvel's Epic Comics imprint.

Spiegle provided the art for Indiana Jones: Thunder in the Orient (1993–1994) and Indiana Jones and the Spear of Destiny (1995), published by Dark Horse Comics. He drew Nintendo Power magazine's "Nester's Adventures" feature (formerly "Howard & Nester") in its later stages until it was discontinued in 1993. In the mid-1990s, he drew the short-lived revival of Terry and the Pirates after Tim and Greg Hildebrandt left. Spiegle worked with the Bank Street College of Education as an illustrator of a number of "Bank Street Classic Tales" published in Boys' Life magazine, Bible stories for the American Bible Society, and in 2008, he teamed up with Evanier again for a new Crossfire story, drawing the character's portion of the cover of, and the eight-page story "Too Rich to Be Guilty" in About Comics' fancifully numbered Many Happy Returns #2008. With no cover date on it or on another work that year — pages 3 to 20 of "Ragin' Abe Simpson and the Flying Hellfish in: War is Smelly" in Bongo Comics Group's licensed TV title Simpsons Comics #144 — it is difficult to ascertain which was his last published comics work but it is likely the Graphic Classics adaptation of Clarence E. Mulford's "Hold Up", penned by Tim Lasiuta, published in March 2011.

Spiegle died on January 28, 2017, at the age of 96.

== Awards ==
Spiegle received an Inkpot Award in 1983.

Preceded by Mike Royer	Korak, Son of Tarzan artist 1968–1972	Succeeded by Frank Thorne
Preceded by Ric Estrada (in 1976)	Blackhawk artist 1982–1984	Succeeded by n/a
