= Will Meugniot =

American cartoonist

Will Meugniot (/ˈmiːnioʊ/) is an American writer, storyboard/comics artist, film producer and director.

He is known for his work on animated shows spanning the 1980s, 1990s, and 2000s.

== Awards and nominations ==
- 1991, Daytime Emmy nomination for 'Outstanding Animated Program' for Captain Planet and the Planeteers
- 1991, Daytime Emmy nomination for 'Outstanding Animated Program' for The Real Ghostbusters
- 1999, won International Monitor Award for 'Children's Programming – Director' for The Secret Files of the Spy Dogs

== Selected works ==
=== TV series ===
- The Adventures of Corduroy (storyboard artist)
- Batman: The Animated Series (storyboard artist)
- Biker Mice from Mars (storyboard artist, 2006 version)
- Bionic Six (storyboard director)
- Bob the Builder (director, Ready, Steady, Build!)
- Bucky O'Hare and the Toad Wars (storyboard director)
- Captain America (unproduced due to Marvel's bankruptcy problems, replaced by Spy Dogs)
- Captain Planet and the Planeteers (storyboard artist, supervising producer, supervising director, for DIC Entertainment)
- Captain Power and the Soldiers of the Future (storyboard artist)
- Conan the Adventurer (producer)
- C.O.P.S. (storyboard artist)
- Defenders of the Earth (storyboard director)
- Denver the Last Dinosaur (storyboard artist)
- Diabolik (storyboard artist)
- The DNAgents (co-creator, artist)
- Exosquad (executive producer)
- Earthworm Jim (producer, storyboard artist; pitchfilm only)
- Galtar and the Golden Lance (story director, storyboard artist)
- Godzilla (story director)
- G.I. Joe: A Real American Hero (title designer, storyboard director)
- G.I. Joe: Valor vs. Venom (producer, storyboard artist)
- Jana of the Jungle (story director)
- Jem (producer, storyboard artist)
- Jonny's Golden Quest (storyboard artist)
- Jonny Quest vs. The Cyber Insects (storyboard director)
- Jurassic Park (storyboard artist, producer; pitchfilm for unproduced series)
- Little Shop (storyboard artist)
- Moon Dreamers (storyboard artist)
- NFL Rush Zone (storyboard artist)
- The New Adventures of Zorro (storyboard artist)
- Ozzy and Drix (storyboard artist)
- Pryde of the X-Men (producer)
- The Real Ghostbusters (director, producer when it was titled "Slimer and The Real Ghostbusters")
- Return of the Living Dead III (storyboard artist)
- Ring Raiders (director)
- RoboCop: The Animated Series (storyboard director, art director)
- Silver Surfer (storyboard supervisor)
- Street Fighter: The Animated Series (writer, animator, creative consultant)
- Spider-Man and His Amazing Friends (storyboard artist)
- Spider-Man Unlimited (producer, story of the first six episodes)
- Sport Billy (storyboard artist)
- The Secret Files of the Spy Dogs (writer of 2 & director of 12 episodes)
- Stargate Infinity (director)
- The Super Hero Squad Show (storyboard artist)
- Swamp Thing (storyboard artist)
- Teenage Mutant Ninja Turtles (storyboard artist, storyboard cleanup artist, 2003 version)
- The World's Greatest Super Friends (story director)
- X-Men (supervising producer, storyboard artist)
- X-Men: Evolution (storyboard artist)
- Dragonlance: Dragons of Autumn Twilight (director)
- Ultimate Avengers 2 (director)
- Dinosaur Island (director)

=== Books ===
- 1977, Superbitch No. 1 ASIN: B001GQN8YC
- 1992, Exotic Fantasy: The Sketchbooks of Will Meugniot ASIN: B0006P21IS
- 2004, Dnagents: Born Orphans, ISBN 0971633878
- 2006, Zombie Monkey Monster Jamboree, ISBN 1933925078
- 2008, DNAgents Industrial Strength Edition, ISBN 1582409692
- 2008 Pandora (as illustrator) ISBN 1602701385
- 2010, The Boy Who Cried Wolf (as Illustrator) ISBN 1602705526
