= Sergio Aragonés =

Spanish Mexican cartoonist (born 1937)

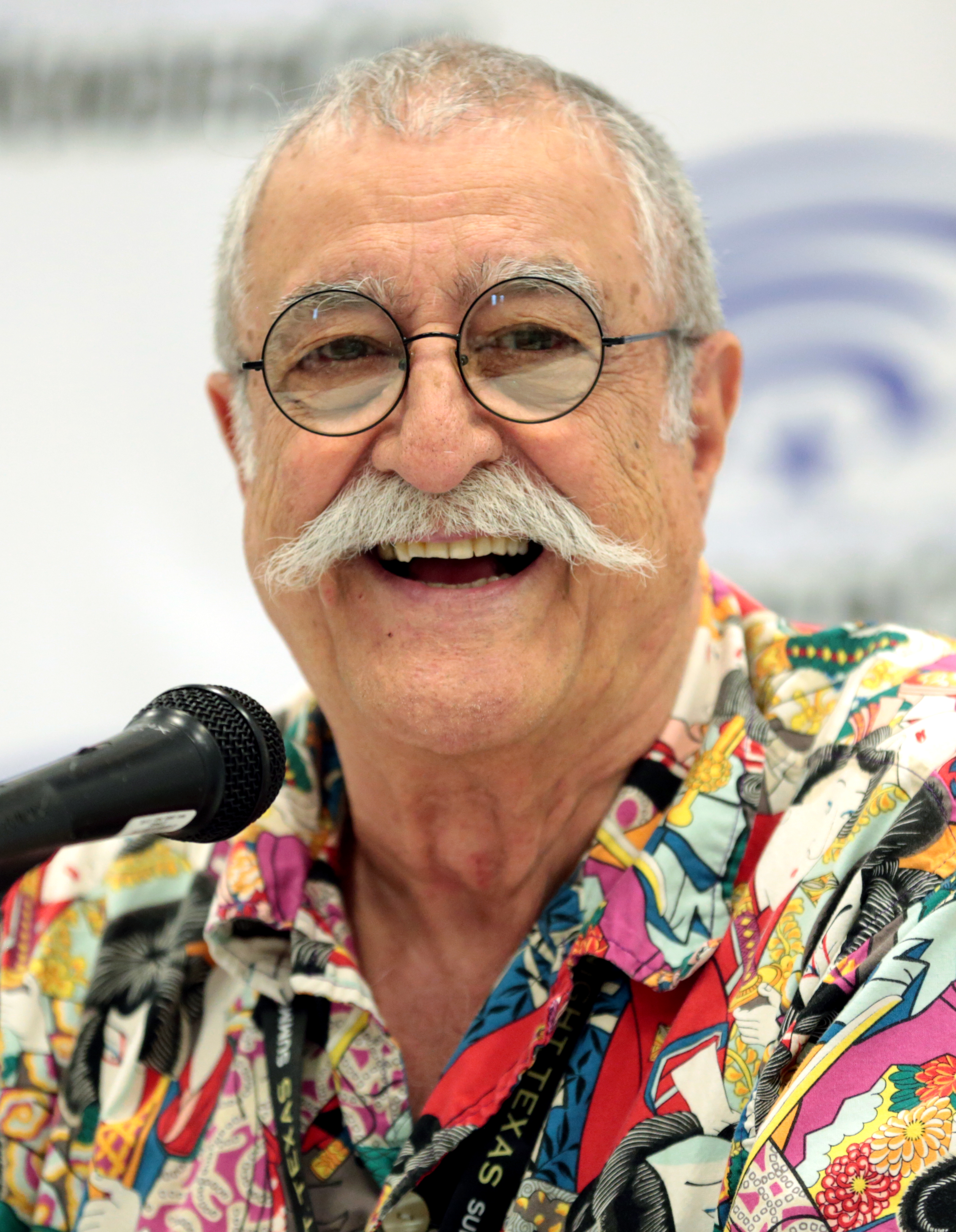
- Aragonés at the 2017 WonderCon
- Born: Sergio Aragonés Domenech; 6 September 1937 (age 89); Sant Mateu, Castellón, Spain
- Known for: Cartoonist, writer
- Notable work: Mad, Groo the Wanderer
- Awards: List: Shazam Award, Best Inker (Humor Division), and Best Humor Story in 1972; Inkpot Award 1976; Harvey Award Special Award for Humor in 1990, 1991, 1992, 1993, 1995, 1997, 1998, 1999, and 2001; National Cartoonist Society Comic Book Award for 1986, Humor Comic Book Award for 1973, 1974, and 1976, Magazine and Book Illustration Award for 1989, Special Features Award for 1977, Gag Cartoon Award for 1983, and Reuben Award in 1996; Adamson Award for Best International Comic-Strip or Comic Book work in Sweden, 1985; Eisner Award, Best Short Story in 2001

Sergio Aragonés Domenech (/ˌærəˈɡoʊnɪs/ ARR-ə-GOH-niss; Spanish: [ˈseɾxjo aɾaɣoˈnes ðoˈmenek]; (Note: In isolation, Domenech is pronounced [doˈmenek].) born 6 September 1937 in Sant Mateu, Castellón, Spain) is a Spanish-Mexican-American cartoonist and writer best known for his contributions to Mad magazine and creating the comic book Groo the Wanderer.

Among his peers and fans, Aragonés is widely regarded as "the world's fastest cartoonist". The Comics Journal has described Aragonés as "one of the most prolific and brilliant cartoonists of his generation". Mad editor Al Feldstein said, "He could have drawn the whole magazine if we'd let him."

Aragonés has won numerous awards and accolades for his work, including Shazam Awards, a Harvey Award, an Inkpot Award, a Reuben Award, an Eisner Award, and a National Cartoonists Society Comic Book Award. In October 2024, he was inducted into the Harvey Awards Hall of Fame.

== Early life ==
Born in Sant Mateu, Castellón, Spain, Aragonés emigrated with his family to France, due to the Spanish Civil War, before settling in Mexico at age 6. Aragonés had a passion for art since early childhood. As one anecdote goes, Aragonés was once left alone in a room by his parents with a box of crayons. His parents returned sometime later to find that he had covered the wall in hundreds upon hundreds of drawings. Aragonés recalled his early difficulties in Mexico, saying, "I didn't have too many friends because I had just arrived. You're the new kid, and you have an accent. I've always had an accent ... When the other kids make fun of you, you don't want to get out of the house. So you stay at home, and what do you do? You take pencils and start drawing."

Aragonés used his drawing skills to assimilate. "The earliest money I ever made was with drawings", he remembered. "The teacher would give us homework, which would consist of copying Chapter Eleven, including the illustrations ... a beetle or a plant, the pistil of a flower, or soldiers – that type of thing. All the kids who couldn't draw would leave a square where the drawing was, and I would charge them to draw that. The equivalent of a few pennies ... That's probably why I draw so fast, because I drew so many of them."

He made his first professional sale in 1954 when a high school classmate submitted Aragonés' work to a magazine without telling him. Aragonés continued to sell gag cartoons to magazines while studying architecture at the National Autonomous University of Mexico (UNAM), where he studied mime under the direction of Alejandro Jodorowsky. "I joined the class", Aragonés recalled, "not to become a mime but to apply its physical aspects of movement to my comics."

Aragonés taught Mexican Popular Art at the University of Mexico, and became engaged to one of his American students, Lilio Chomette. In 1962, Aragonés moved to the United States, where he married Chomette and settled with her in New York.

== Arrival in the United States ==
According to the artist, he arrived in New York in 1962 with nothing but 20 dollars and his portfolio of drawings. After working odd jobs around the city, Aragonés went to Mad's offices on Third Avenue hoping to sell some of his cartoons. "I didn't think I had anything that belonged in Mad," said Aragonés. "I didn't have any satire. I didn't have any articles. But everybody was telling me, 'Oh, you should go to Mad."

Since his knowledge of English was not very extensive, he asked for the only Mad artist he knew of that spoke Spanish, Cuban-born artist Antonio Prohías, creator of the comic strip "Spy vs. Spy". Aragonés hoped Prohías could serve as an interpreter between him and the Mad editors. According to Aragonés, this proved to be a mistake, since Prohías knew even less English than he did. Prohías did receive Aragonés very enthusiastically and, with difficulty, introduced the young artist to the Mad editors as "Sergio, my brother from Mexico," temporarily leading to even further confusion, as the Mad editors thought they were meeting "Sergio Prohías." Mad editor Al Feldstein and publisher Bill Gaines liked what they saw, and Aragonés became a contributor to the magazine in 1963. His first sale was an assortment of astronaut cartoons which the editors arranged into a themed article.

When associate editor Jerry DeFuccio encouraged Aragonés to submit more material in the future, the cartoonist took it to heart, producing a full article on motorcycle cops overnight. He returned to the Mad offices the following morning, and made his second sale. In 2022, Aragonés told an interviewer, "I was back at the door before they opened. They were asking, "What happened? What do you need?" I said, "No, I have your articles here." They couldn't believe it. I had drawn close to 15 ideas and they loved it."

With little money and no connections in the US, Aragonés spent so much time at the office that publisher Gaines allowed him to sleep there overnight. "I don't think any other company would have been so generous or friendly," Aragonés recalled 57 years later.

== Work in Mad ==
Aragonés has worked continuously for Mad from 1963 to the present day; even when the magazine transitioned into an almost-all-reprint format, he continued to contribute original marginal cartoons. As of December 2025, he had the longest continual streak of any Mad contributor, with new material in every issue since 1967. "They told me, 'Make Mad your home,'" said Aragonés, "and I took it literally."

Aragonés has had a featured section in every issue called "A Mad Look At...", typically featuring 4–5 pages of speechless gag strips that are all related to a single subject, such as "Gambling," "UFOs" or "Pizza." Aragonés also became famous for his wordless "drawn-out dramas" or "marginals" (cf. marginalia) which were inserted into the margins and between panels of the magazine. The drawings are both horizontal and vertical, and occasionally extend around corners. Prior to Aragonés's arrival at Mad, the magazine had sometimes filled its margins with text jokes under the catch-all heading "Marginal Thinking." Aragonés convinced Feldstein to use his cartoons by creating a dummy sample issue with his Marginals drawn along the edges. The staff of Mad enjoyed his marginals, but did not expect him to be able to maintain the steady stream of small cartoons needed for each issue. Aragonés has provided marginals for every issue of Mad since 1963 except one (his contributions to that issue were lost by the Post Office). Associate Editor Jerry DeFuccio said, "Writing the 'Marginal Thinking' marginals had always been a pain in the butt. Sergio made the pain go away."

Aragonés is a very prolific artist; Al Jaffee once said, "Sergio has, quite literally, drawn more cartoons on napkins in restaurants than most cartoonists draw in their entire careers." In 2002, writer Mark Evanier estimated that Aragonés had written and drawn more than 12,000 gag cartoons for Mad alone. His new marginal gags in the April 2024 Mad marked the 509th issue that Aragonés has contributed to, the most of any writer or artist. He passed Al Jaffee, whose work had appeared in 508 Mad issues between 1955 and 2020.

== Comic books ==
In 1967, he began writing and illustrating full stories for various DC Comics titles, mainly for the horror anthologies House of Mystery and House of Secrets. He wrote or plotted stories that were illustrated by other artists. Aragonés helped create DC's Western series Bat Lash and the humor title Plop!. Aragonés broke with DC when the company began insisting on work-for-hire contracts; when Aragonés balked, an editor tore up Aragonés's paycheck in front of his face. He had been trying obliquely to sell a comic book premise to DC or Marvel, but neither company would allow Aragonés to retain the copyright. "I didn't want anyone stealing the idea", said Aragonés, "and they weren't able to talk on a theoretical basis."

Groo the Wanderer vol. 2 #1 (March 1984)

Aragonés had created the humorous barbarian comic book Groo the Wanderer in the late 1970s, but the character did not appear in print until 1982. Groo was so named because Aragonés sought a name which meant nothing in any language. Writer Mark Evanier subsequently joined Aragonés on Groo. Evanier's role originally was as something of a translator, as Aragonés was still somewhat shaky at expressing his ideas in English. Eventually, the two began collaborating on story ideas, and there have been several Groo stories in which Evanier is credited as the sole writer. Aragonés has since become fluent in English. The other regular contributors to the comic book are letterer Stan Sakai (himself the creator/artist of Usagi Yojimbo), and colorist Tom Luth. As a creator-owned series, Groo has survived the bankruptcy of a number of publishers, a fact which led to the industry joke that publishing the series was a precursor to a publisher's demise. The title was initially published by Pacific Comics, briefly by Eclipse Comics, then Marvel Comics under their since-discontinued Epic Comics imprint which allowed creators to retain copyrights, then Image Comics, and currently Dark Horse Comics.

On 2 December 1982, Marty Feldman died from a heart attack in a hotel room in Mexico City. This occurred during the making of the film Yellowbeard. Aragonés, who was filming nearby and was dressed for his role as an armed policeman, had introduced himself to Feldman that night. He encountered Feldman abruptly, startling and frightening him, which may have induced Feldman's heart attack. Aragonés has recounted the story with the punchline "I killed Marty Feldman". The story was converted into a strip in Aragonés's issue of DC Comics' Solo.

In the early 1980s, Aragonés collaborated with the Belgian cartoonist François Walthéry on Natacha, l'hotesse de l'air, a well known series from the magazine Spirou. This story was titled "Instantané pour Caltech". Aragonés appears in the strip as a police officer character (ISBN 2-8001-0856-8 / DUPUIS Editor – Belgium).

Aragonés interviewed in 2011

In April 2022, Aragonés was reported among the more than three dozen comics creators who contributed to Operation USA's benefit anthology book, Comics for Ukraine: Sunflower Seeds, a project spearheaded by IDW Publishing Special Projects Editor Scott Dunbier, whose profits would be donated to relief efforts for Ukrainian refugees resulting from the February 2022 Russian invasion of Ukraine.

Aragonés's work can be found in other compilations, including The Big Book of the Weird, Wild West, in which he illustrates a retelling of the Donner Party incident. His cartoons have appeared in a series of paperback editions for Mad.

== Film and television ==
In 1976, he had an acting role in the film Norman... Is That You? where he played one of the desk clerks at the Buenos Noches Hotel.

He appeared in the short-lived 1977 revival of TV's Laugh-In.

In addition to printed work, Aragonés has worked in television animation. He worked on the NBC program Speak Up America (1980) where he would draw during the show. His segments were used for many years on the Dick Clark Bloopers programs. Frequent collaborator Mark Evanier related an anecdote from their time on the short-lived 1983 NBC series The Half Hour Comedy Hour, which featured a guest appearance by model Jayne Kennedy:

This was one of the most beautiful women in the world, and she wore this dress that was very revealing. So much so, the censors wouldn't let us put her on the air in it without adding some material. So we're all talking to her, the writers and whoever, just in awe of this woman. And Sergio comes walking in looking like a homeless person, carrying his portfolio. And Jayne sees him and she shouts, 'Sergio!' and she runs over and starts kissing him passionately. They'd worked together before, it turned out. But Johnny Carson comes walking out into the hallway and he thinks Jayne Kennedy is being sexually assaulted by a homeless person in the NBC hallways. He came over to make sure she was okay. She said it was fine, that she knew him, and I said, 'It's okay, he's a cartoonist.' So Johnny gives that classic look and he says, 'I knew I should have taken up drawing.'

Stan Lee interviewed Aragonés in the 1991 documentary series The Comic Book Greats.

In 2009, Aragonés told an interviewer, "I'm thinking and laughing all day long. Every time I think of a joke, I'm also telling myself a new joke. It's a great way to live."

He appeared as his own preserved head in the Futurama episode "Lrrreconcilable Ndndifferences", hosting the "Last Actual Comic Book Booth" at Comic Con 3010.

In 2020, Aragonés guest-starred in The Casagrandes episode "Mexican Makeover" voicing Lupe's pet parrot and Sergio's cousin Paco.

== Awards ==
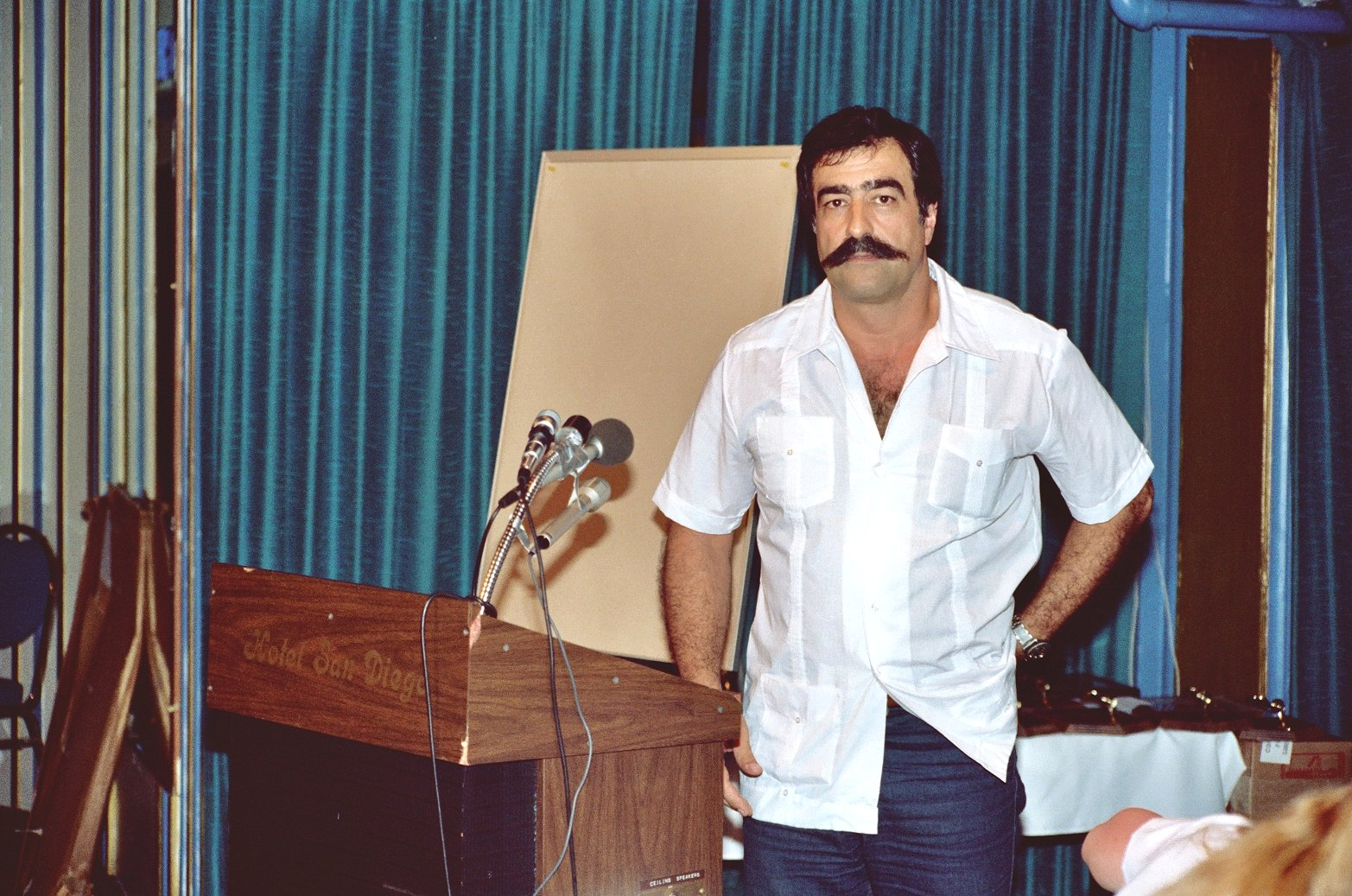
Aragonés at the 1982 San Diego Comic Con (today called Comic-Con International)

Aragonés's work has won him numerous awards. He won Shazam Awards for Best Inker (Humor Division) in 1972 for his work on Mad Magazine and for Best Humor Story in 1972 for "The Poster Plague" from House of Mystery No. 202 with Steve Skeates. Aragonés received an Inkpot Award in 1976. He won the Harvey Award Special Award for Humor in 1990, 1991, 1992, 1993, 1995, 1997, 1998, 1999, and 2001. He received the National Cartoonists Society Comic Book Award for 1986, their Humor Comic Book Award for 1973, 1974, and 1976, their Magazine and Book Illustration Award for 1989, their Special Features Award for 1977, their Gag Cartoon Award for 1983, and their top Reuben Award in 1996 for his work on Mad and Groo the Wanderer. In 1985 he was awarded the Adamson Award for Best International Comic-Strip or Comic Book work in Sweden. In 1992 he became the first Mexican ever to win the Eisner Award for his work on Groo the Wanderer, along with Mark Evanier.

In 2009, an exhibition, Mad About Sergio, was held at the Ojai Valley Museum. Visitors saw examples of Aragonés's cartooning dating back to childhood, publications he has appeared in, some of his awards, and Marginal-style sketches by Aragonés literally drawn onto the museum's walls and display cases.

The Comic Art Professional Society award's prize's name is "The Sergio", an homage to his work.

On 11 October 2024, the Harvey Awards announced that Aragonés was one of five comics creators to be inducted into the Harvey Awards Hall of Fame at the 36th annual Harvey Awards ceremony on 18 October at the New York Comic Con. The other four inductees were Arthur Adams, Larry Hama, Akira Toriyama, and John Buscema. Upon learning of the accolade, Aragonés commented, "What an honor it is to be inducted into the Harvey Awards Hall of Fame. Harvey was a great inspiration to me and so many other cartoonists."

== Bibliography ==
- Aunt's in Your Pants: Memoirs of a Dirty Old Woman (1967, Alexicon Corp.), collection of cartoons focused on an indecent old lady.
- "Abel's Fables", a page of one panel gag comics in House of Secrets featuring Abel. (1971–1972, DC Comics)
- Plop! (1973–1976, DC Comics), Aragonés provided intros, stories, gags, and/or prologues for 23 issues of the 24 issue run.
- DC Super Stars Presents... (1977, DC Comics), the thirteenth issue of this DC Comics artist anthology series is subtitled "The Wild and Wacky World of Sergio Aragonés" and features all-new stories and gags.
- Jon Sable, Freelance (1986, First Comics). The thirty-third issue of this Mike Grell comic book features 23 pages of Aragonés's art for a story titled "Cave of the Half-Pints."
- Usagi Yojimbo (1988, Fantagraphics Books). The eleventh issue of this Stan Sakai comic book features an eight-page Aragonés's story titled "Catnippon and the Missive."
- Aragonés 3-D (1989, 3-D Zone), booklet of wordless humor in 3-D, includes two pairs of 3-D glasses.
- Buzz & Bell, Space Cadets (1991, Platinum Editions), graphic novel of wordless humor featuring an astronaut and his monkey buddy.
- Smokehouse Five (1991, Platinum Editions), graphic novel of wordless humor featuring the misadventures of a group of firefighters.
- The Mighty Magnor (1993–1994, Malibu Comics), six-issue superhero mini-series (with Mark Evanier).
- Louder Than Words (1997, Dark Horse Comics), six-issue mini-series of wordless humor.
- Boogeyman (1998, Dark Horse Comics), a four-issue mini-series of humorous horror stories (with Mark Evanier).
- Louder Than Words TPB (09/1998, Dark Horse Comics, softcover), collecting the 6-issues-series from 1997
- Dia De Los Muertos (Day of the Dead) (1998, Dark Horse Comics), one-shot comic about the annual Mexican celebration honoring the dead (with Mark Evanier).
- Fanboy (1999, DC Comics), six-issue mini-series on comics and society's reaction to them, from the point of view of a self-described "fanboy" (with Mark Evanier).
- Boogeyman TPB (06/1999, Dark Horse Comics, softcover), collecting the 4-issues-series from 1998
- Blair Which? (1999, Dark Horse Comics), one-shot comic with Mark Evanier spoofing the movie The Blair Witch Project
- Space Circus (2000, Dark Horse Comics), four-issue mini-series of a boy joining a circus that travels throughout the galaxy (with Mark Evanier).
- Actions Speak (2001, Dark Horse Comics), another six-issue mini-series of wordless humor (sequel to "Louder Than Words").
- Sergio Aragonés Massacres Marvel (1996, Marvel Comics), Sergio Aragonés Destroys DC (1996, DC Comics), and Sergio Aragonés Stomps Star Wars (2000, Dark Horse Comics), the artist's comical interpretation of the superheroes of both Marvel and DC and the mythology of the Star Wars franchise (all with Mark Evanier).
- Actions Speak TPB (05/2002, Dark Horse Comics, softcover), collecting the 6-issues-series from 2001
- Solo (2006, DC Comics), the eleventh issue of this DC Comics artist anthology series features various stories written and illustrated by Aragonés, some biographical, and a Batman story written by Mark Evanier.
- Bart Simpson/Simpsons Comics (2009, Bongo Comics), He is a writer/artist since Bart Simpson No. 50, and he did a full issue in Simpsons Comics No. 163. He has a one to three-page comic strip called, "Maggie's Crib" in every issue of Bart Simpson since No. 50
- Sergio Aragonés Funnies (July 2011–February 2014, Bongo Comics), A twelve-issue anthology of fictional, non-fictional and autobiographical content in addition to puzzles and related materials under Aragonés's sole authorship.
- Louder Than Words, Actions Speak TPB (07/2024, Dark Horse Comics, hardcover), collecting the two 6-issues-series from 1997 and 2001
- Space Circus TPB (12/2024, Dark Horse Comics, softcover) collecting the 4-issues-series from 2000
