= Fright Night (franchise) =

American horror franchise

- Official franchise logo
- Created by: Tom Holland
- Original work: Fright Night (1985)
- Owner: Columbia Pictures
- Years: 1985–present

Films and television
- Film(s): Fright Night (1985); Fright Night Part 2 (1988); Fright Night (2011); Fright Night 2: New Blood (2013)

Fright Night is an American horror franchise consisting of three theatrical films and one direct-to-video film. Created by writer and director Tom Holland, the films generally follow a teenager who learns that his neighbor is a vampire and, with the help of his allies, attempts to stop him while facing other vampires along the way.

The original film received positive reviews and performed well at the box office. Its sequel, however, was a financial failure and was met with negative reviews, though it has gained some retrospective appreciation over time. The 2011 remake was both a critical and commercial success, with modern critics often ranking it among the best horror remakes ever made, and some considering it superior to the original. Its sequel, on the other hand, was widely panned by critics and earned very little from home media sales.

A legacy sequel to the original film is currently in development.

== Film ==
Film	U.S. release date	Director	Screenwriter(s)	Producer(s)
Fright Night	August 2, 1985	Tom Holland	Tom Holland	Herb Jaffe
Fright Night Part 2	May 19, 1989	Tommy Lee Wallace	Tommy Lee Wallace and Tim Metcalfe & Miguel Tejada-Flores	Herb Jaffe and Mort Engelberg
Fright Night	August 19, 2011	Craig Gillespie	Marti Noxon	Michael De Luca and Alison Rosenzweig
Fright Night 2: New Blood	September 20, 2013	Eduardo Rodríguez	Matt Venne	Michael J. Gaeta and Alison R. Rosenzweig

=== Fright Night (1985) ===
Charley Brewster, a teenage fan of a weekly television series titled Fright Night who is an avid horror enthusiast, begins to question the intentions of the neighbor who recently moved into the neighborhood named Jerry Dandrige, and his roommate Billy Cole. After a number of occurrences, Charley begins to suspect that Jerry may actually be a vampire. When a series of suspicious homicides involving women are brought to light, Charley is convinced that Jerry is responsible. After attempts to inform the police prove unsuccessful, Charley, his girlfriend Amy, and his friend Edward "Evil Ed" Thompson seek the help of has-been host of his favorite television program, Peter Vincent. Though Peter is initially skeptical, he begins to realize there is more to Charley's suspicions than everyone realizes. Together the team looks for a way to kill the vampire living next door.

=== Fright Night Part 2 (1989) ===
After three years of overcoming his trauma from the events that transpired with his vampiric neighbor, Charley Brewster realizes that the incident is improbable. The now twenty-year-old survivor attends numerous counseling sessions, where his counselor is convinced that the undead monsters he came in contact with years before were merely figments of his overactive imagination. As a part of his therapy, he avoids contact with Peter Vincent who had helped him slay the vampires. When several new residents move into the neighborhood, including the seductive actress named Regine Dandrige, Charley begins to question their intentions. Charley realizes that she is Jerry's sister, as she begins to take unusual interest in Charley, his new girlfriend Alex, and Peter. The team come to the conclusion that she is a vampire seeking revenge for the destruction of her undead brother. Haunted by the past, and hunted by a monster, Charley must overcome his fears to once again defeat the monsters that feast on the civilians of his town.

=== Fright Night (2011) ===
Charley Brewster, a teenage senior in high school who's dating the most popular girl at school named Amy, is enjoying his school year. This changes however, when Jerry Dandrige moves in next door. Jerry is charismatic and becomes a person of interest, when Charley witnesses some unusual activity going on next door. After a series of events, Charley becomes convinced that his new neighbor is a vampire. Though he shares his theory with others, no one believes him. Together with his girlfriend, he seeks the help of an illusionist and expert of the supernatural named Peter Vincent. As a team, they set out to kill the monster that is plaguing their neighborhood, before he overtakes them all.

=== Fright Night 2: New Blood (2013) ===
Some time after their near-death experiences while encountering Jerry Dandrige, Charley Brewster attends a college in Romania as a foreign exchange student, alongside his friend "Evil" Ed and his ex-girlfriend Amy. Following a series of events, he begins to suspect that his seductive art professor Gerri Dandrige may also be undead. As he begins to investigate his suspicions further he discovers that she is actually the ancient Elizabeth Báthory, a vampire who seeks to complete a pagan ritual with the blood of a "new moon virgin" and that she plans to do so with Amy. Though their relationship didn't last, Charley still loves Amy, and is determined to stop the sacrifice from happening. As things seem to be hopeless he turns once again to the person that helped him defeat Jerry, the vampire hunter Peter Vincent. Together they race against time, to stop the monsters from completing their scheme which will turn them all into creatures of the night.

=== Future ===
In October 2020, Tom Holland announced that a legacy sequel to the original film which largely ignores the events of Part 2, was in development. Holland stated that he is working on a script that is tentatively titled, Fright Night: Resurrection. The project will largely, retcon the events of the 1988 sequel. Though the filmmaker would not reveal many of the story details, he stated that the plot involves original characters: Charlie Brewster, Edward "Evil Ed" Thompson, Jerry Dandrige, and Billy Cole.

== Main cast and characters ==
List indicator

This section includes characters who will appear or have appeared in the franchise in main roles.

- An empty grey cell indicates the character was not in the film, or that the character's official presence has not yet been confirmed.

Character	Original films		Remake films	
Character	Fright Night	Fright Night Part 2	Fright Night	Fright Night 2 New Blood
Character	1985	1988	2011	2013
Charley Brewster	William Ragsdale	William Ragsdale	Anton Yelchin	Will Payne
Peter Vincent	Roddy McDowall	Roddy McDowall	David Tennant	Sean Power
Jerry Dandrige J.D	Chris Sarandon	Mentioned	Colin Farrell	Mentioned
Amy Peterson	Amanda Bearse	Mentioned	Imogen Poots	Sacha Parkinson
Edward "Evil Ed" Lee	Stephen Geoffreys	Mentioned	Christopher Mintz-Plasse	Chris Waller
Judy "Jane" Brewster	Dorothy Fielding		Toni Collette	
Billy Cole	Jonathan Stark			
Detective Lennox	Art J. Evans			
Alex Young		Traci Lind		
Regine Dandrige		Julie Carmen		
Elizabeth Báthory Gerri Dandridge				Jaime Murray
Shayla Sunshine				Alina Minzu
Inspector Constantin				Constantin Barbulescu

== Additional crew and production details ==
Film	Crew/Detail					
Film	Composer	Cinematographer	Editor	Production companies	Distributing company	Running time
Fright Night (1985)	Brad Fiedel	Jan Kiesser	Kent Beyda	Columbia Pictures, Vistar Films, Columbia-Delphi IV Productions	Columbia Pictures	1hr 46mins
Fright Night Part 2	Brad Fiedel	Mark Irwin	Jay Lash Cassidy	The Vista Organization, New Century Vista Film Company	TriStar Pictures	1hr 44mins
Fright Night (2011)	Ramin Djawadi	Javier Aguirresarobe	Tatiana S. Riegel	DreamWorks Pictures, Michael De Luca Productions, Gaeta/Rosenzweig Films	Walt Disney Studios Motion Pictures	1hr 46mins
Fright Night 2: New Blood	Luis Ascanio	Yaron Levy	Don Adams	20th Century Fox, Gaeta / Rosenzweig Films	20th Century Fox Home Entertainment	1hr 39mins

== Reception ==
=== Box office and financial performance ===
Film	Box office gross			Box office ranking		Video sales gross	Worldwide sales total	Budget	Worldwide total net income	Ref.
Film	North America	Other territories	Worldwide	All-time domestic	All-time worldwide	North America	Worldwide sales total	Budget	Worldwide total net income	Ref.
Fright Night (1985)	$24,922,237	—N/a	$24,922,237	#3,196	#4,460	figures not available	> $24,922,237	$7,000,000	> $17,922,237	
Fright Night Part 2	$2,983,784	—N/a	$2,983,784	#7,324	#11,283	figures not available	> $2,983,784	$8,000,000	> -$5,016,216	
Fright Night (2011)	$18,302,607	$22,700,000	$41,002,607	#3,834	#2,949	$10,738,948	$51,741,555	$30,000,000	$21,741,555	
Fright Night 2: New Blood	—N/a	—N/a	—N/a	—N/a	—N/a	$1,009,614	$1,009,614	< $2,100,000	~ -$1,090,386	
Totals	$46,208,628	$22,700,000	$68,908,628	x̅ #3,589	x̅ #4,673	$11,748,562	> $80,657,190	≤ $47,100,000	> ~$33,557,190	

=== Critical and public response ===
Film	Rotten Tomatoes	Metacritic	CinemaScore
Fright Night (1985)	83% (66 reviews)	62/100 (13 reviews)	—N/a
Fright Night Part 2	31% (13 reviews)	—N/a	—N/a
Fright Night (2011)	72% (181 reviews)	64/100 (30 reviews)	B−
Fright Night 2: New Blood	TBD	—N/a	—N/a

== Stage ==
The official stage adaptation made its debut at the Carnegie Stage in Pittsburgh, Pennsylvania, on October 5, 2018. Directed by Erynn Dalton, with a stage-play written by James Michael Shoberg, the production was a joint-venture production between Rage of the Stage Players, and Infinite Abyss studios. Dan Finkel, Elena Cristina Lázaro, Greg Crawford, Corey Shaffer, Brian Ceponis, and Ryan Ott featured in the primary cast: Charley Brewster, Amy Petersen, Peter Vincent, Edward "Evil Ed" Thompson, Jerry Dandrige, and Billy Cole, respectively. The plot closely followed that of the original film, while adding additional content and plot devices.

The play was well received by critics with praise directed at its cast, the script, its use of nostalgic undertones, the cast's performance, the production quality including costumes and set design, the integration of horror-campiness, the suspenseful story, and the interactive nature of the play. Criticism was directed at its pacing.

== Other media ==
Literary releases

- Novelizations:

- Fright Night (1985): Published by Tor Books and developed to release as a novelization to coincide with the feature film debut, in 1985. The book was co-written by Craig Spector and John Skipp, after the authors received a copy of the script. Though the plot follows the movie closely, there are additional scenes in its pages that explore character relations.
- Fright Night: Origins (2022): An adaptation and expansion of the original film, published by Holland House and Encyclopocalypse Publications. The novel expands on the source material, and is co-written by franchise creator Tom Holland, alongside A. Jack Ulrich. The plot is stated to include greater detail and convey ideas that Holland had to cut previously due to time constraints on the movie. Holland stated that, the book is "intend to take the Fright Night universe far beyond the story the films have told". The book was released on September 6, 2022.

- Comic book series: A series of 27 comic book literary releases, published by NOW Comics and released from 1988-1993, the standalone series of comic books released Fright Night Part 2 as a graphic novel. After its release, the continuing series centered around the further adventures of Peter Vincent and Charley Brewster, who team up to fight an array of monsters. In the final issues, Jerry Dandrige was brought back from the dead and featured in a story-arc where he accumulates an army of French vampire wives. The comics were abruptly cancelled when the company filed for bankruptcy.

Video game

- Fright Night: The Arcade Game (1988): Developed and published by MicroDeal Ltd., exclusively for the Amiga personal computers, the premise was based on the original film. The arcade game's gameplay featured players taking on the role of Jerry Dandrige, while attempting to turn victims into vampires. The game was met with mixed critical reception, with praise directed at its graphics and criticism at its restrictive gameplay.
