= Jerry Dandrige =

- Chris Sarandon as Jerry Dandrige
- Created by: Tom Holland
- Portrayed by: Chris Sarandon (1985); Colin Farrell (2011)

In-universe information
- Species: Vampire
- Gender: Male
- Spouse: Gabriella Dandridge
- Relatives: Regine Dandridge (sister)

Jerry Dandrige is a fictional character from the Fright Night franchise, a vampire who first appears in the 1985 film Fright Night portrayed by Chris Sarandon, which was later spun-off into a comic book series that used Sarandon's likeness. Dandrige, portrayed by Colin Farrell, also appears in the 2011 remake, in both of which he is the main antagonist. The original screenplay and film credits spell his last name "Dandrige", but some secondary sources, including the makers of the tie-in comics, use the spelling, "Dandridge".

== Fright Night (1985) ==
Jerry Dandrige, along with his undead servant Billy Cole, moves in next door to teenager Charley Brewster (William Ragsdale) and his divorced mother. Charley begins to suspect Dandrige is a killer after seeing a news report about a murdered woman whom Charley had seen in Dandrige's house, and the boy later makes the horrifying discovery that Dandrige is a vampire while spying on him through a window. Dandrige soon learns about Charley's investigation of him and threatens his life, which leads Charley to seek out a TV host named Peter Vincent (Roddy McDowall) to help him find a way to kill Dandrige. Jerry notices that Charley’s girlfriend Amy resembles his deceased lover, and falls in love with her. Jerry kidnaps Amy and turns Charley’s friend Evil Ed into a vampire, telling Charley that the only way to rescue her is for him and Vincent to enter Jerry’s home. Unbeknownst to them, he has already transformed Amy into a vampire. Peter and Charley kill Billy and Evil Ed, before confronting Jerry. The two vampire hunters manage to stall Jerry until dawn, and then smash the walls of his cellar to allow sunlight to enter, which burns Jerry into ash. With Jerry dead, Amy is cured of her vampirism.

== Fright Night (comics) ==
Aside from using the alternate spelling of his name, the comics remain consistent with the original film. After his death, Dandridge's ashes are collected by the Legion of the Endless Night, a powerful vampire organization. With the aid of a witch and using the body of an all-star NBA player named Moves Wilson, the Legion is able to resurrect Dandridge, who is now blessed with the ability to withstand the rays of the sun. As the Legion falls apart, Dandridge flees to France and begins to amass his own legion of vampires, beginning with a Parisian prostitute named Lili.

== Fright Night (2011) ==
The character also appears in the 2011 remake of the film, also called Fright Night. Neighbor Charley Brewster (Anton Yelchin) comes to suspect that Dandrige (Colin Farrell) is a vampire and responsible for the disappearances of several neighborhood residents.

== In other media ==
An arcade-style computer game was released in 1988 for Amiga computers. In the game, players assume the role of Jerry Dandrige as he attempts to turn his victims into vampires before sunrise.

Jerry Dandridge is a minor character in the 1995 Kim Newman novel The Bloody Red Baron.

Fright Night 2: New Blood features Elisabeth Bathory (played by Jaime Murray), a vampire using the alias "Gerri Dandridge", but the characters are otherwise apparently unrelated.

== Homoerotic interpretation ==
In the original film, Jerry Dandrige has been variously interpreted as gay, bisexual, and metrosexual. Literary critic John Kenneth Muir noted instances in the original film in which Dandrige and his human-slave protector are posed in potentially sexual positions. These include a scene in which Dandrige's male companion and daytime protector, Billy Cole, kneels before Dandrige. Cole is dressing a wound Dandrige has received on his right hand, but Muir found the position reminiscent of fellatio. Dandrige's speech to "Evil" Ed Thompson, in which Dandrige convinces Ed to become a vampire, is also cast in the language of homosexual seduction. Ed is placed in a physically submissive stance, and Dandrige speaks of Ed's outsider status in language that echoes the outsider status of homosexuals in the 1980s.

Anthropologist Paul Clough and cultural critic Jon P. Mitchell characterized Dandrige as "beautiful but strange" and a man interested in seeking out relationships with young boys and young girls. Dandrige introduces Charley to homosexuality, bisexuality, and through his victims, prostitution. They called Dandrige's actions a metaphor for sexually transmitted diseases in general and HIV in particular.

According to Fright Night editor Kent Beyda, writer-director Tom Holland deliberately set out to insert homosexual imagery and themes into the film. He confirmed that the scene in which Cole goes to his knees in front of Dandrige was intended to evoke homosexuality as part of Holland's intent to explore every sexual aspect of the vampire myth.

== See also ==
- Carmilla
