= Discovery Park of America =

Heritage museum in Tennessee, U.S.

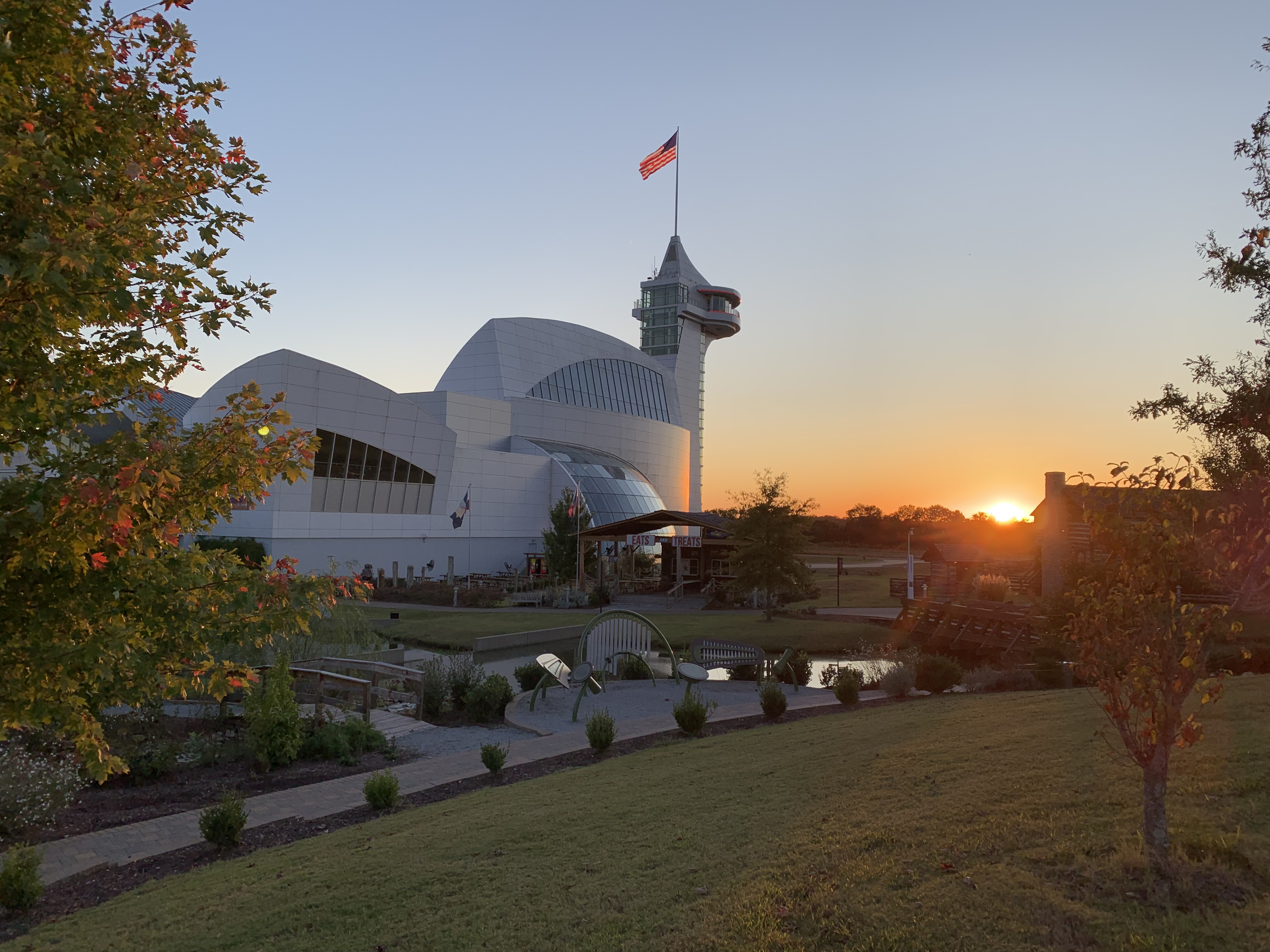
- Interactive map of Discovery Park of America
- Date opened: November 1, 2013
- Location: 830 Everett Blvd., Union City, Tennessee 38261
- Land area: 50.0 acres (20.2 ha)
- Floor space: 100,000 sq ft (9,300 m^{2})
- Management: Scott Williams, CEO
- Website: www.discoveryparkofamerica.com

Discovery Park of America is a museum and heritage park located in Union City, Tennessee. The park sits on 50 acres (20 ha) of land off of Everett Boulevard, near U.S. Route 51 and the proposed Interstate 69. It features exhibits and activities on local history, nature, military history, art and science.

== History ==
Discovery Park of America was preceded by the Obion County Museum, which was founded in 1970 and housed the historical collections of the McNatt and Harmon families of Obion County, Tennessee. The Obion County Museum was operated entirely by volunteers for 40 years. In 2005, Robert E. Kirkland, a local businessman known for cofounding the Kirkland's chain of home decor stores, approached the Obion County Museum board about the possibility of building a larger facility in Union City. Kirkland and his wife, Jenny D. Kirkland, had recently sold their portion of CBK, Ltd. (the parent company of Kirkland's) in order to concentrate on local philanthropy. Kirkland met secretly with local businessman Jack Hudgens and Obion County Museum board members Larry Mink and Polly Brasher at the Obion County Library to form a Vision Team. The secrecy of the meetings was to assure that if the idea proved unfeasible, the general public would not be disappointed.

After the Vision Team made its initial plans, Canadian architect Douglas Cardinal was selected to design the new facility as well as its exhibits. The Vision Team wished for the community to be involved in the project and designated eighteen committees, composed primarily of local volunteers. Thirteen of these committees were responsible for the development of the galleries and exhibits within the museum, while five were responsible for the commercial aspects, such as accounting and marketing. Kirkland chose the name Discovery Park of America for the new facility, and asked his lifelong friend and another local businessman, Jim Rippy, to volunteer and serve as chairman of the newly developed Discovery Park of America board of directors.

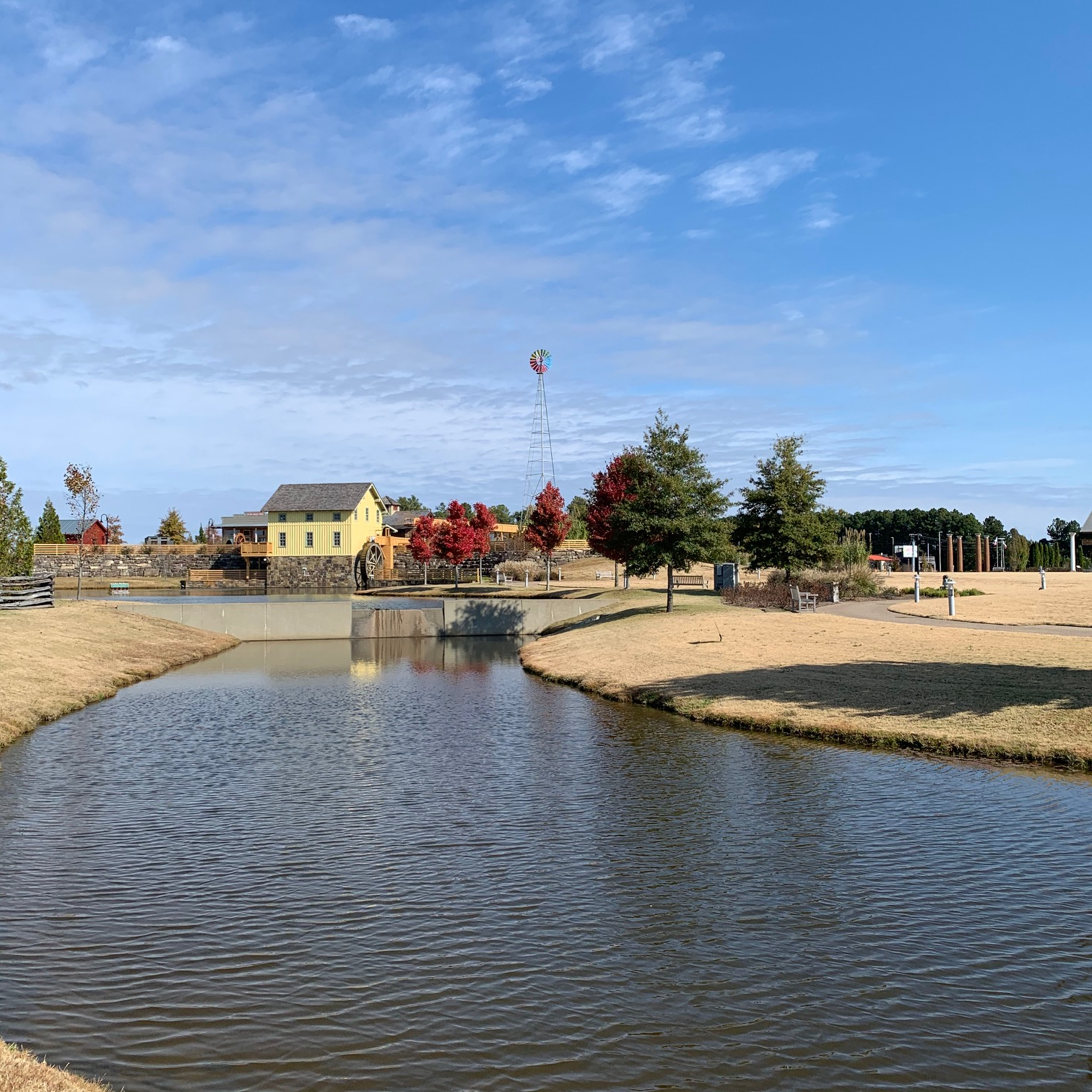
The North grounds of the heritage park.

Allen Searcy Building Contractors was hired as the principal construction contractor and a groundbreaking ceremony was held on July 1, 2008 in a soybean field on the northwest edge of Union City. At this time, the park was set for completion in 2010. However, on July 8, 2009, Kirkland terminated Douglas Cardinal and construction was halted as the search began for a new architect. Months earlier, Obion County Museum board-member Polly Brasher, who by then was working as the Discovery Park of America Founding Director, had met Kurt Cederquest of Maltbie Exhibit Fabricators at a trade show in Philadelphia, Pennsylvania and mentioned the project. After hearing of Cardinal's dismissal, Cederquest contacted his colleagues at Verner Johnson Museum Architects of Boston and Thinc Design of New York City to persuade them to collaborate with him on the project. The three firms made a joint pitch to Discovery Park of America which resulted in a contract in January 2010, and construction resumed on the project in December. Lou Sirianni of Verner Johnson Museum Architects was selected to design the main building, while Tom Henness of Thinc Design would oversee the design of the exhibits and gallery spaces. Kirkland instructed the teams, "design a building that will stop traffic at 70mph." The building also had to include an observation tower and a grand hall. Construction continued for nearly three years. In addition to the main building, Richie Smith Landscape Architects of Memphis, Tennessee was hired to design the 50-acre heritage park surrounding the central museum, which includes two small lakes connected by a moat and a terraced series of weirs.

The site sits directly adjacent to the future Interstate 69 corridor and will be connected by exits immediately North and South of the park. The future interstate is meant to connect Canada to Mexico through Texas, Louisiana, Arkansas, Tennessee, Kentucky, Indiana, and Michigan. Union City and Discovery Park sit near the halfway point between these destinations, and the potential tourism catalyzed by the eventuality of a major roadway was taken into consideration when choosing the site of the park, as it would make day trips from St. Louis, Memphis, Evansville, and dozens of rural counties more convenient.

In January 2013, Jim Rippy retired from his position at an insurance company and joined Discovery Park full-time as Chief Executive Officer and expanded the staff to fill opening niches as the project neared completion. Donors, sponsors, and long-time supporters were invited to preview the park on October 15, 2013. The park opened to the public with a ribbon cutting ceremony on November 1, 2013. The design and construction had taken nearly ten years and cost approximately $80 million. The Robert E. and Jenny D. Kirkland Foundation was founded as a trust, assuring a provision of $3 million annually for a period of 20 years.

On December 31, 2018, Jim Rippy retired as chief executive officer, and Scott Williams was selected as his successor. Williams, a native of West Tennessee, is the former CEO of the Newseum in Washington, D.C. He also worked with Elvis Presley Enterprises, Inc. for 12 years as part of the management team at Graceland in Memphis.

During the COVID-19 pandemic in the spring of 2020, Discovery Park closed to protect its guests and employees from the spread of the disease. The park plans to reopen to its members on May 30 and to the general public on June 1. In the meantime, park staff have shared educational and motivational content via social media. The park hosts a semester-long Historical Theater Academy twice a year, and the spring 2020 sessions are being conducted online. The park maintains an official website, a Facebook page, an Instagram, and a YouTube channel with which to share updates on the status of reopening, as well as educational content.

In December 2020, Discovery Park intends to unveil a new permanent exhibit in the Ag Center on the north side of the park. The exhibit is titled AgriCulture: Innovating for our Survival, and will discuss innovative techniques in the agriculture industry from the first to last step of the process. CEO Scott Williams released a statement saying, "We're calling this a 'mind-blowing, myth-busting farming exhibit that will change the world' and we're certain that after they experience our exhibit, guests will have a much better understanding of how food and fiber get from the farm to the family."

Discovery Park hosts the podcast series Reelfoot Forward: A West Tennessee Podcast, which focuses on the culture and history of West Tennessee. In each episode, CEO Scott Williams interviews a notable guest from fields such as history, education, agriculture, sports, business, and other areas.

== Museum and Heritage Park ==
=== Discovery Center ===
The park's central building, Discovery Center, is a three-floor 100,000 sq ft (9,300 m^{2}) facility that is divided into 9 permanent exhibit galleries, a traveling exhibit hall, a theater, an observation tower, a cafe, a gift shop, and 3 programming and event spaces. The building contains 2,000 tons of steel and is built atop 1,056 geopiers, making it resistant to the occasional small earthquakes in the area.

The 9 permanent exhibit galleries within Discovery Center are:

- The Energy Gallery, which contains exhibits relevant to the generation, storage, transmission, and use of electricity throughout history. These exhibits include a giant interactive turbine and a solar-powered airplane race station.
- The Enlightenment Gallery, which serves as Discovery Park's "Cabinet of Curiosities," housing artifacts that are unique and do not fit the themes of other galleries. Exhibits here include a scale replica of the Ark of the Covenant, a suit of armor, a vampire killing kit, and a replica of the Rosetta Stone. Many of the artifacts in the gallery are from Robert Kirkland's private collection.
- The Military Gallery, which can be found on both the first and second floor of the building, and houses an array of Civil War weaponry including a partial recreation of a City-Class ironclad warship, World War I artifacts, a Military Living History Theater, a British Mark I tank replica, a Boeing-Stearman Model 75 airplane, a Jeep and a Humvee which guests can touch, a Sikorsky UH-34D helicopter which guests can climb into, and hundreds of Korean War and Vietnam War-era artifacts throughout the south atrium.

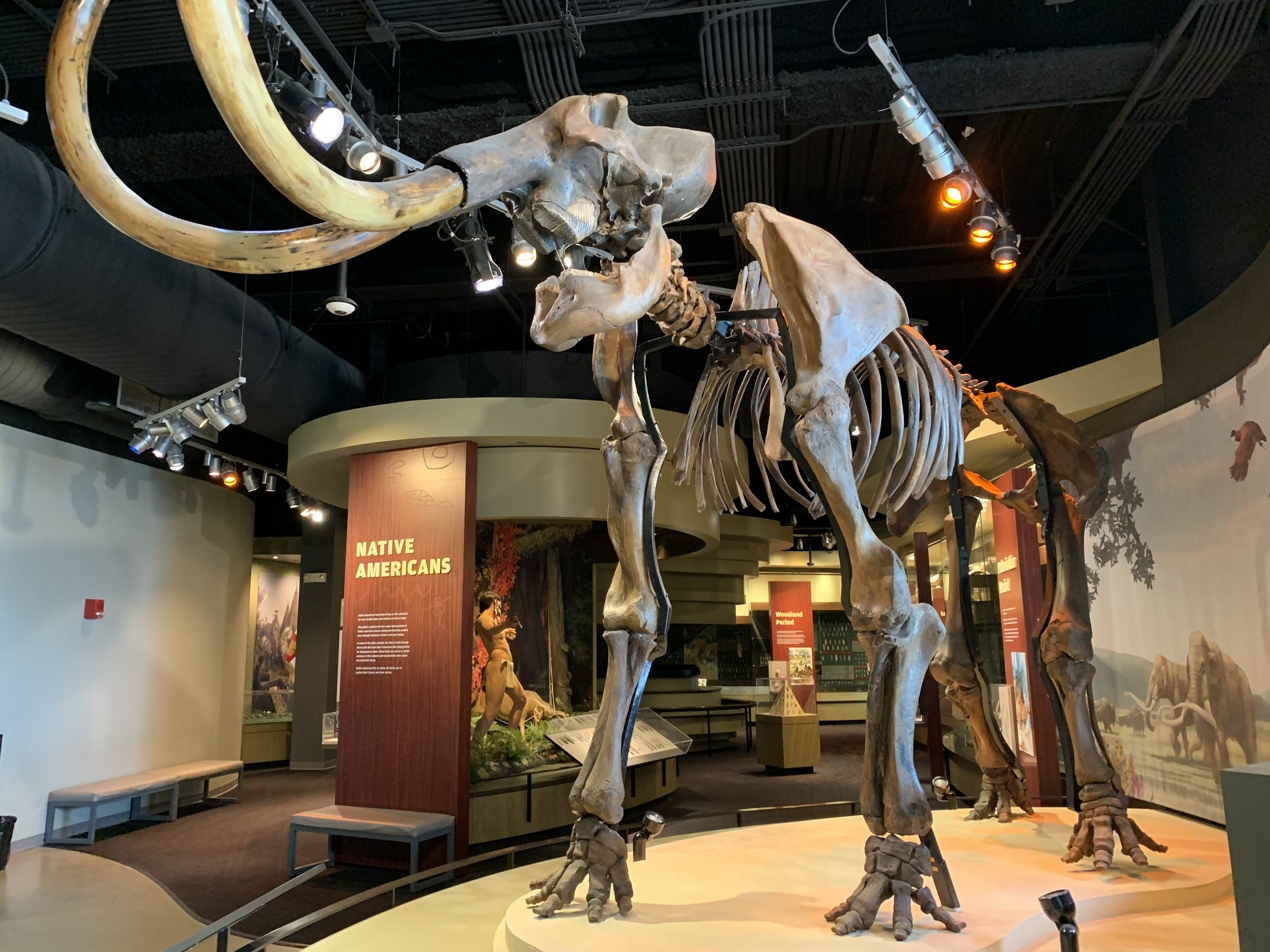
The Native American Gallery

- The Native American Gallery, which houses 4,812 of the 8,400 Native American artifacts in the museum's collection. The artifacts are laid out along a timeline from the Paleoindian Period (9000-9000 years BP) to the Historic Period and constitute one of the largest exhibits of its kind in the eastern United States. A 12,000 year old woolly mammoth skeleton is also on display near the Paleoindian Period artifacts.
- The Natural History Gallery, which includes the Grand Hall, also known as Dinosaur Hall. The gallery focuses on the paleontology and geology of the United States and houses six full-size dinosaur skeleton casts, including Apatosaurus and Tyrannosaurus rex, as well as three mosasaurs, a megalodon jaw, a saber-toothed cat, hundreds of invertebrate fossils, a mineral wall, and an interactive plate tectonics globe.
- The Regional History Gallery, featuring live exhibits such as snakes, turtles, salamanders, frogs, and a 20,000 gallon aquarium with fish native to the region. Aquarium staff conduct daily programming in the gallery. In addition to wildlife, this gallery includes hundreds of artifacts related to nearby Reelfoot Lake, including an Earthquake Simulator room that explains how the lake formed during the 1811-12 New Madrid Earthquakes.
- The Space, Science, & Technology Gallery, which constitutes the majority of the museum's third floor. This gallery includes a replica of the Gutenberg Printing Press, a communications technology showcase, a Big Bang simulator, a solar system model, a 640 lb fragment of the Nantan meteorite, and a theater showing short films related to science and space.
- Simmons Bank Children's Exploration Gallery, which includes a toddler play area (Fantasy Forest Play Area), an antique toy exhibit, a water table play area, a KEVA plank build area, and a 48 ft tall metal human that serves as a slide from the third to second floor.
- The Transportation Gallery, which houses over a dozen classic automobiles dating back to 1910. The gallery includes a 1923 Model-T, a 1959 Cadillac series 6200, the NASCAR 2007 Chevrolet Budweiser #8 driven by Dale Earnhardt Jr., as well as a 1929 Dual-Cowl Lincoln Sport Phaeton that is the most pristine car of its kind known to exist.
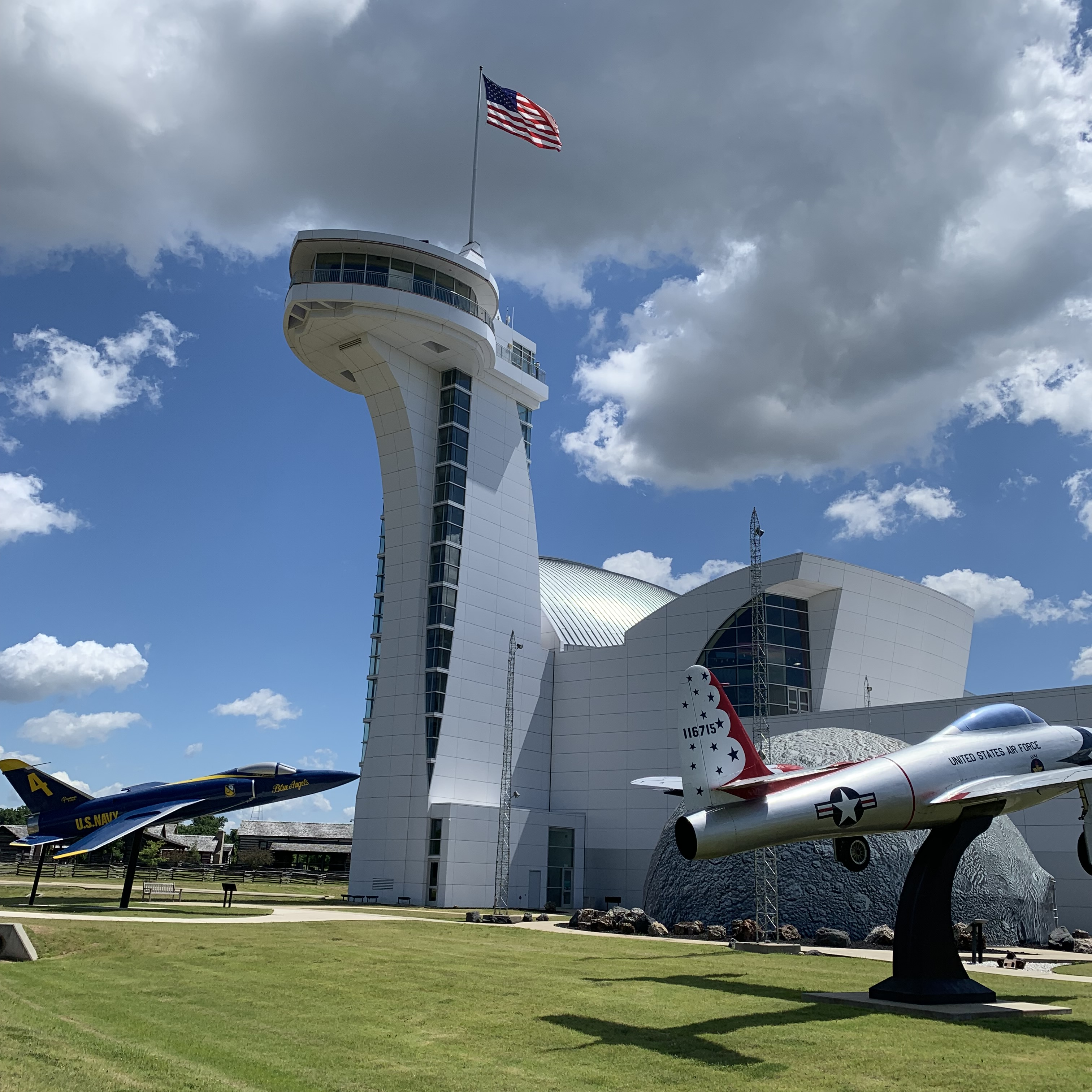
  Cooper Tower, a 120ft observation deck that allows guests to see as far as 12 miles away.

In addition to the permanent galleries, the ATA Traveling Exhibit Hall has hosted a number of temporary traveling exhibits, including Titanic: The Artifact Exhibition, Bodies Revealed, Jurassic Journeys, Da Vinci Machines and Robotics, the Science of Rock n' Roll, LEGO: Towers of Tomorrow, and Astronaut, which explores life aboard the International Space Station.

Cooper Tower, the observation tower accessible through Dinosaur Hall, is a 120-ft observation deck that overlooks the Heritage Park and Union City. On a clear day, one can see for approximately 12 miles on the horizon.

Sabin's Cafe, near the front entrance of Discovery Center, is named after Verne and Nonie Sabin, who brought Reelfoot Lake to the national spotlight in the 1920s by publishing their photographs of the area.

=== Outside exhibits ===
Outside of Discovery Center lies the remainder of the 50 acre heritage park, which includes 8 exhibit areas, a hedge maze, 4 gardens, and 2 lakes.

The 7 outside exhibit areas are:

- The Settlement, a collection of 11 log cabins on the park's north side. The cabins were all built in the 19th century and contain artifacts related to various facets of 19th century life in West Tennessee, such as weaving, cooking, washing, making soap and candles, chopping wood, tending to livestock and grain, gardening, and going to visit a doctor.
- Mill Ridge, which includes a one-room schoolhouse built in the 1890s, a feed store, a waterwheel-equipped grist mill, and a blacksmith shop. This section of the park is intended to mimic early 20th-century life in West Tennessee.
- The Ag Center, which includes a tractor museum, a row crop exhibit, a grape vineyard, a wildflower garden, and a sorghum mill.
- Freedom Square, a collection of buildings meant to mimic "Main Street, U.S.A." This area includes a classic barber shop, a drug store, a firehouse, and a courthouse-style building containing a replica of the Liberty Bell.
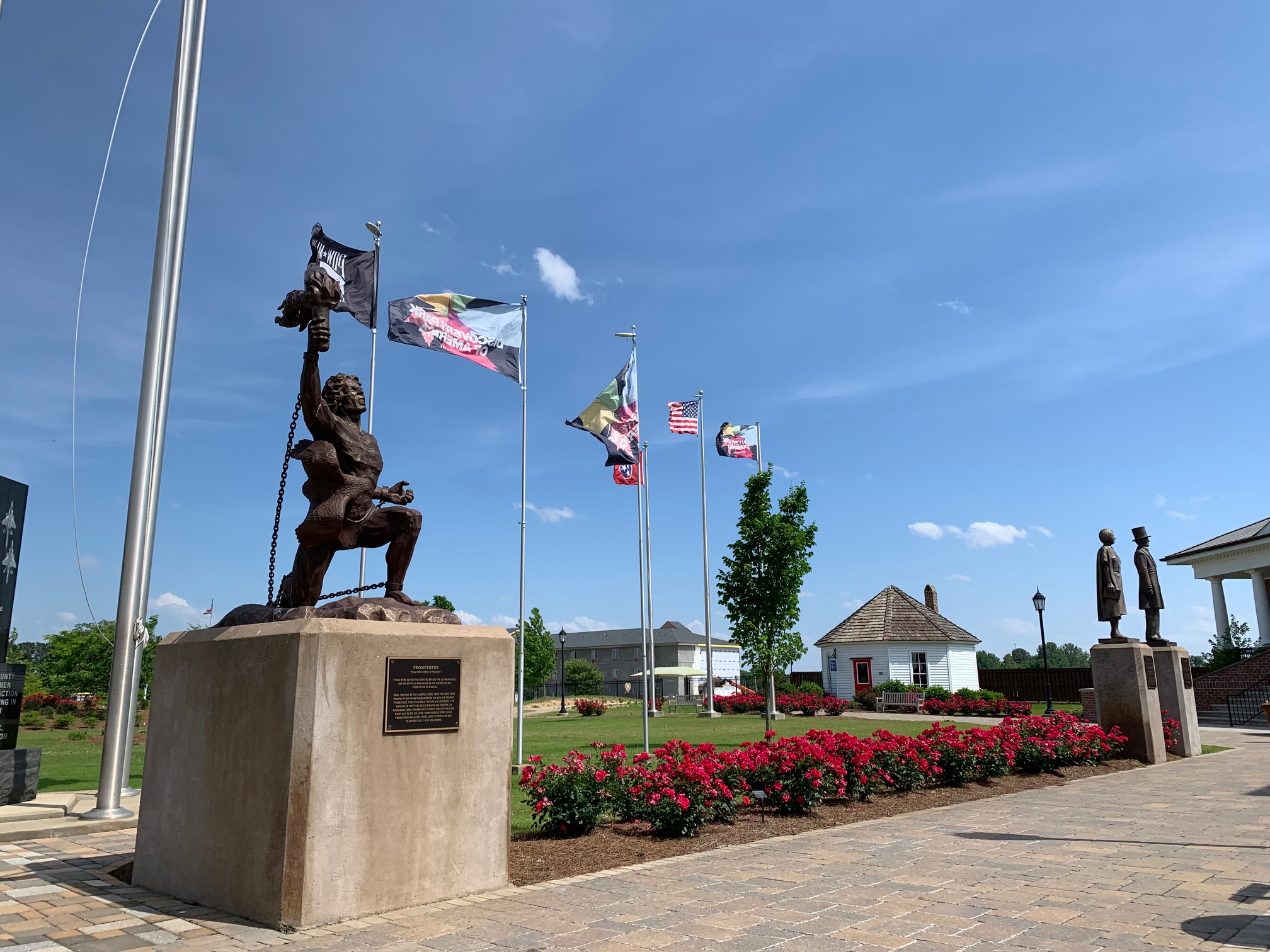
  Freedom Square
- The Depot, which houses artifacts related to the railroad industry that contributed to the development of Union City. Outside the Depot are three train cars from the 1960s, a 1913 Swedish State Railways SJ B 4-6-0 Steam Engine No. 1149, and a caboose.
- The Chapel, which was built under the name New Chapel Methodist Church in the nearby unincorporated community of Elbridge in 1897 and was moved to the park on a tractor trailer.
- STEM Landing, a science and technology exhibit featuring a geodesic dome housing NASA memorabilia, a Grumman F-11 Tiger, and one of the last remaining Titan I ICBM units.
- The Children's Discovery Garden, which features an expansive playground, a stream with pedestrian bridges, a labyrinth, and an assortment of shrubs and flowers.

== Gallery ==
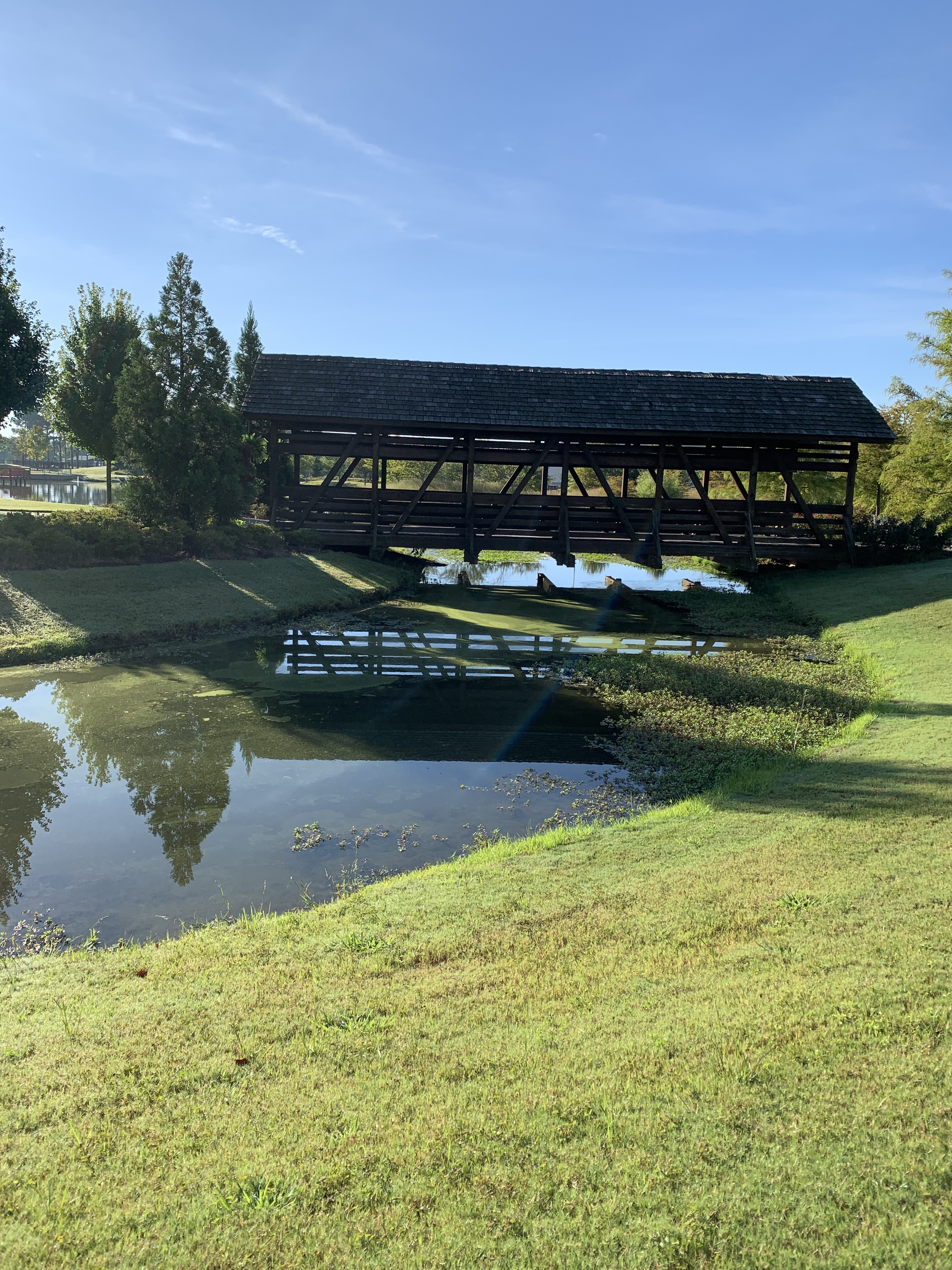
The covered bridge at Discovery Park.

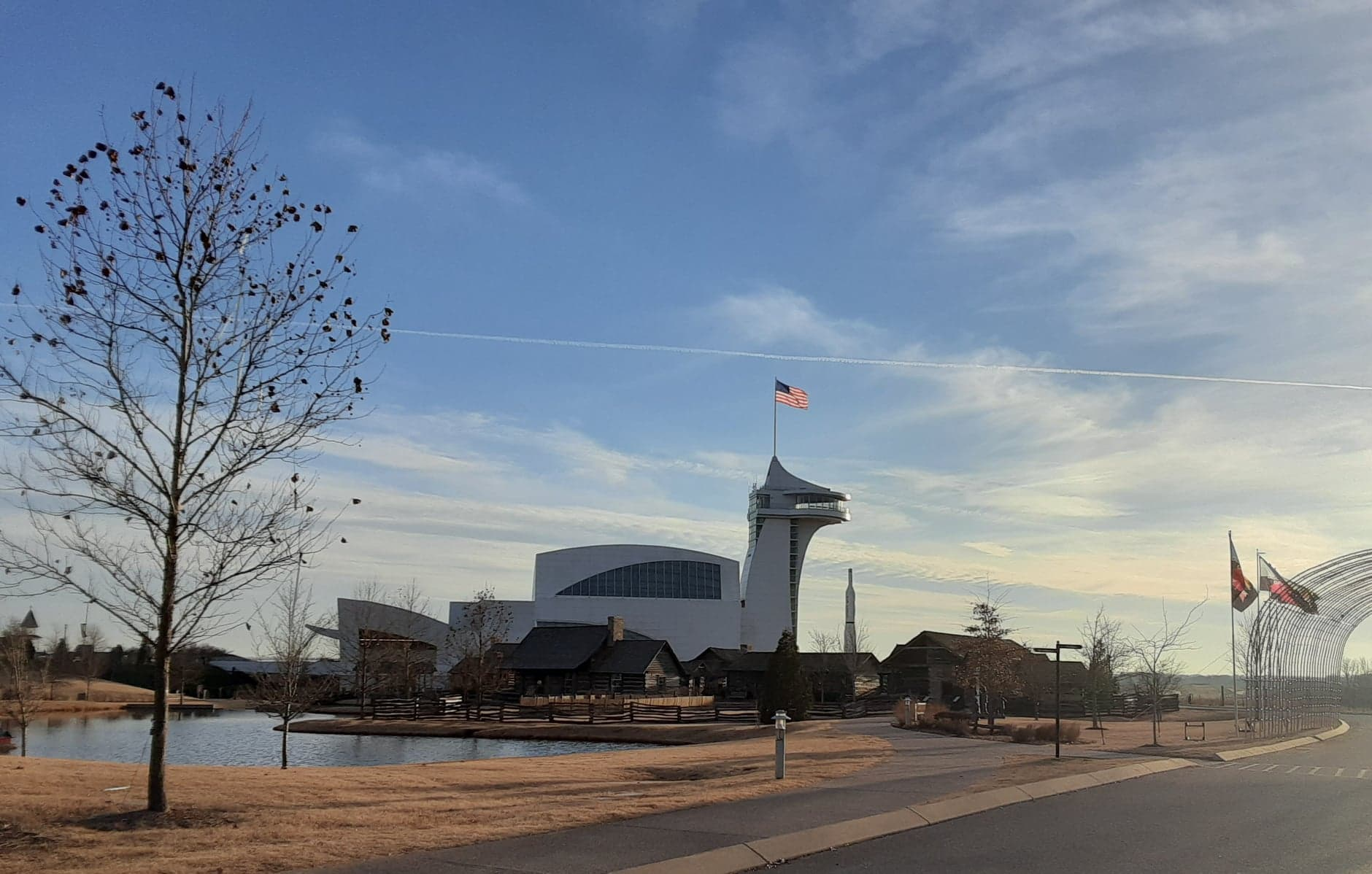
Discovery Center Northern Perspective

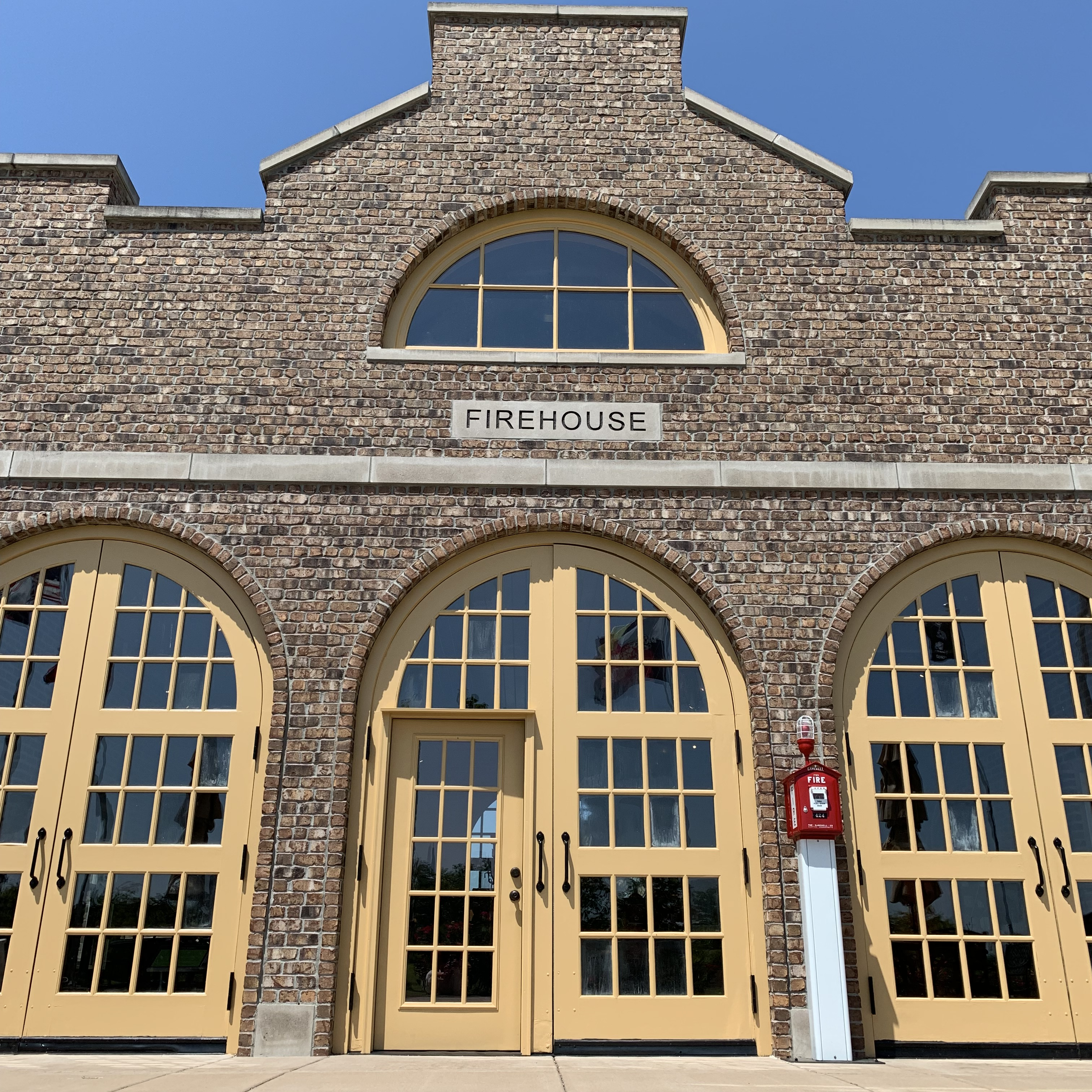
The Firehouse at Freedom Square

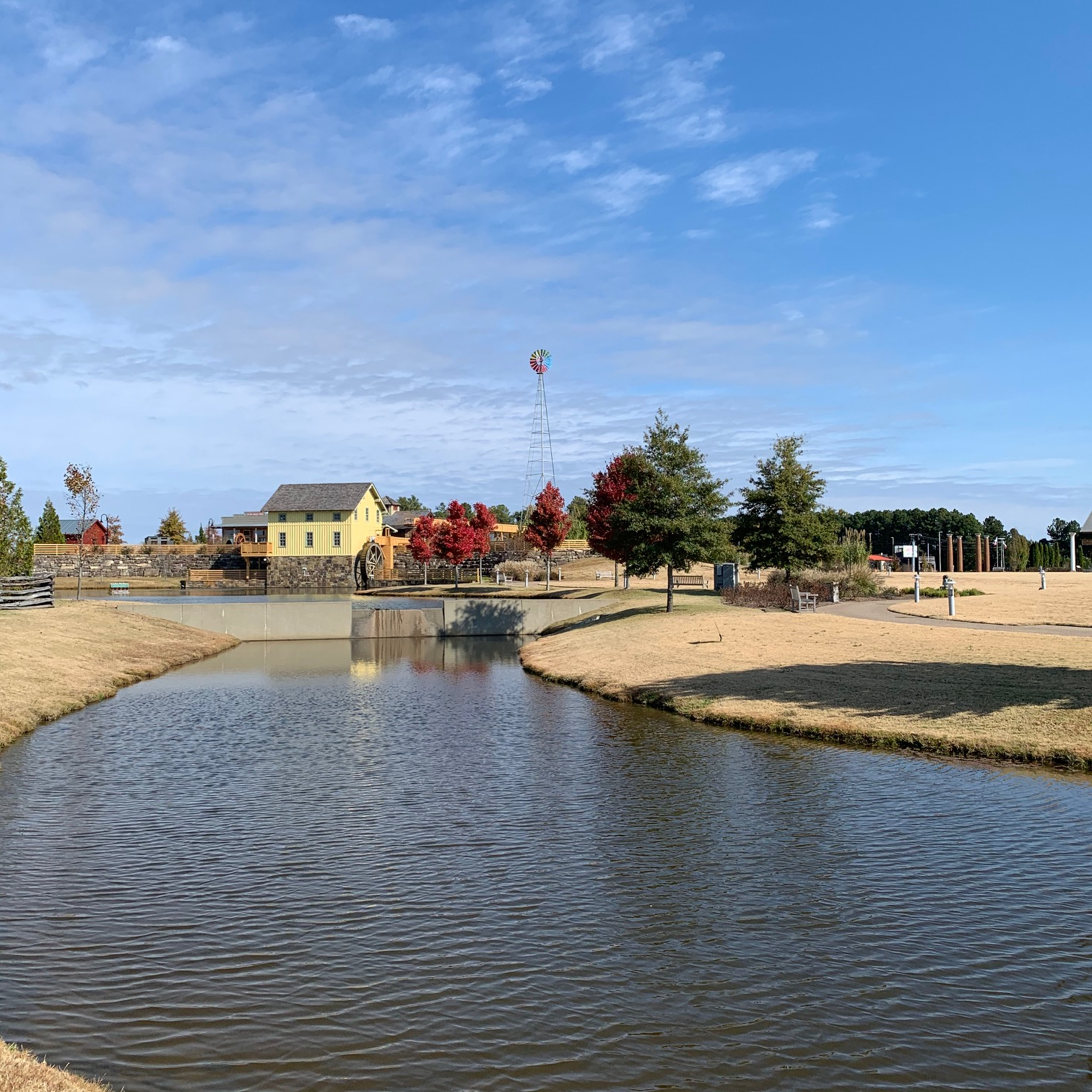
Mill Ridge, with the North Lake in the foreground.

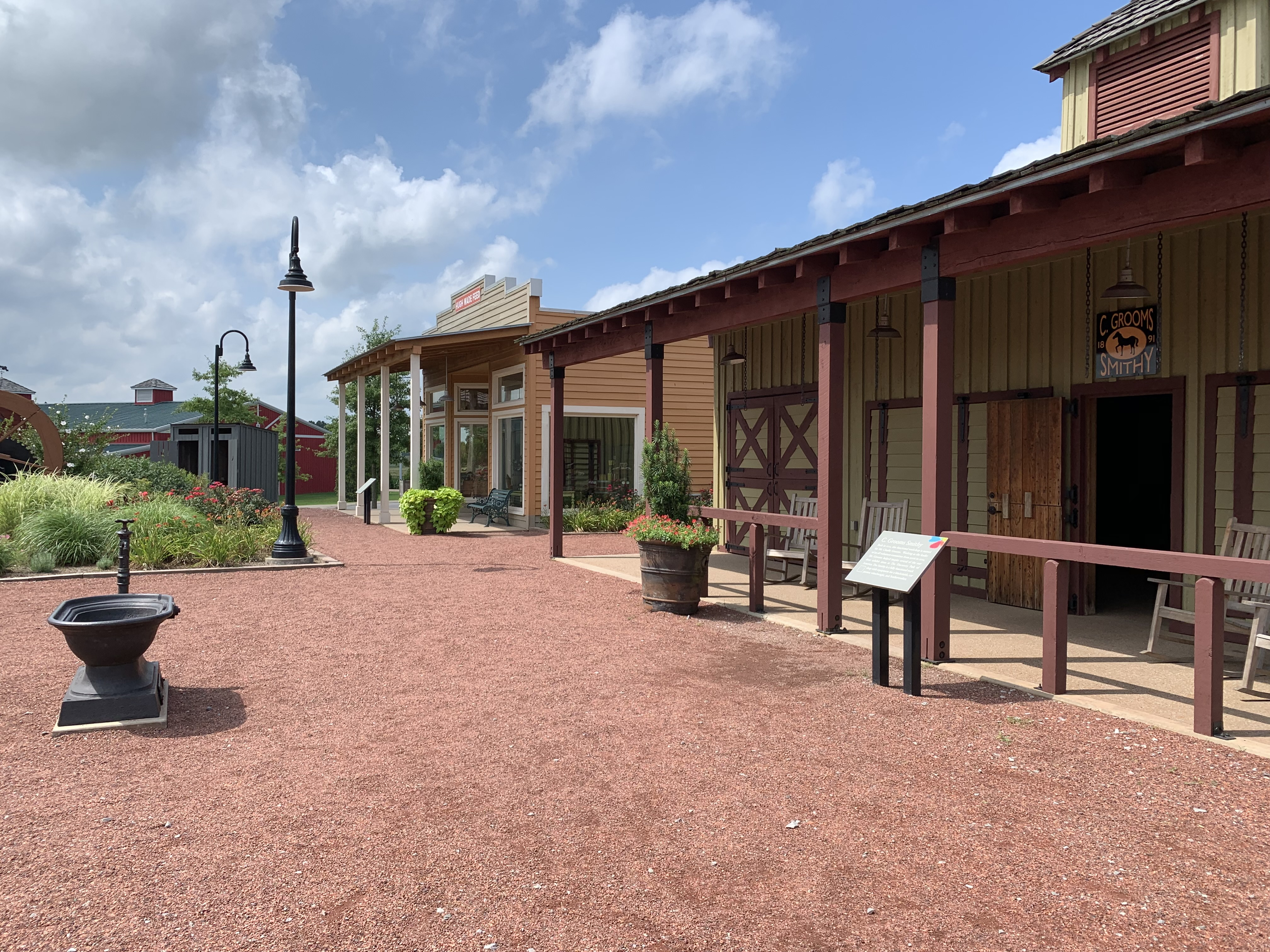
C. Grooms Smithy at Mill Ridge.
