= Fright Night 2: New Blood =

2013 film by Eduardo Rodríguez

- Theatrical release poster
- Directed by: Eduardo Rodríguez
- Written by: Matt Venne
- Based on: Characters by Tom Holland
- Produced by: Michael J. Gaeta; Alison R. Rosenzweig
- Starring: Will Payne; Jaime Murray; Sean Power; Sacha Parkinson; Chris Waller
- Cinematography: Yaron Levy
- Edited by: Don Adams
- Music by: Luis Ascanio
- Production company: Gaeta/Rosenzweig Films
- Distributed by: 20th Century Fox Home Entertainment
- Release date: September 20, 2013
- Running time: 101 minutes
- Country: United States
- Language: English

Fright Night 2: New Blood is a 2013 American supernatural horror film directed by Eduardo Rodríguez. Despite the title, it is not a sequel to the 2011 remake and makes no reference to the events of that film, rather it appears to be a reboot, with the plot being similar to both the original Fright Night and its remake. None of the actors from the previous films reprise their roles. Charley Brewster, Amy Peterson, Evil Ed, and Peter Vincent are in the film, but the previous versions of these characters do not continue their story within this film.

== Plot ==
Charley Brewster, Ed Bates, and Amy Peterson are with their class as exchange students in Romania, where Charley tries to reconcile with Amy after she suspects him of cheating. On the first night in their hotel, Charley spots a beautiful woman having a sexual encounter with another woman, ending with the former drawing blood from the latter, in the residence across the road. That woman is revealed later that night to be Gerri Dandridge, the alluring college professor who will be teaching them about Romanian history and culture.

While on a tour of nearby castles, Charley and Ed break away from the group, and Charley sees Gerri seducing one of the other students. Later that student is missing. That night, Ed sneaks away while Charley spots Gerri loading a body into her car. After she drives away, Charley enters her home and finds a ritual sacrificial chamber. A now elderly-appearing Gerri returns with a young woman whom she drains of blood; Gerri bathes in the blood, restoring her youthful appearance. Once this ritual is complete, she spots Charley hiding in a coffin. He manages to escape.

He tries to report this to the police, but they are convinced he is committing a prank. He tries to tell Amy, but she does not believe him either. The next morning he tells Ed, and Ed identifies Gerri as Elizabeth Báthory, one of the most powerful vampires. They decide to find Peter Vincent, the host of the paranormal investigation show Fright Night. Finding him at a strip club, he agrees to solve their problem for a fee. They leave and meet Amy at a train station. Boarding a train, they find Gerri waiting for them. Peter flees, leaving the others to face Bathory. Ed sacrifices himself so that Charley and Amy can escape into the catacombs. Gerri turns Ed into a vampire, then pursues Charley and Amy, but her quarry escape to the surface. Gerri finds and attacks them again as they try to escape in a taxi, and Amy is taken.

It is revealed that Gerri must bathe in the blood of a virgin born at midnight under a blood moon to withstand sunlight. In order to complete the ritual any witnesses must be killed; Gerri therefore must force Amy to kill Charley. Peter returns to the strip club and is attacked by Ed. Ed, a fan of Vincent's show, is disillusioned by Peter's disbelief in vampires and fraudulent claim to be a vampire hunter. Peter uses a crucifix tattoo on his torso to drive Ed away.

Peter arms Charley with wooden stakes, holy water, and garlic and sends him to kill Gerri before the sun rises and rescue Amy. Upon entering the castle, Ed attacks Charley. Charley forces him to ingest the holy water, causing him to explode.

Charley is grabbed by Gerri and forced into a massive bathing pit where Amy awaits him. She bites Charley, turning him into a vampire. Before she can kill him and complete Gerri's ritual, Charley stakes himself, incapacitating Amy. He does not stake his heart, however, and his wound heals. Peter arrives and stakes Gerri, but he misses her heart, and she pursues him through the castle. Charley emits a high-powered screech that shatters all of the windows, allowing the sunlight to enter and dissolve Gerri.

With the master vampire destroyed, Charley and Amy revert to their human forms. Reconciling, they share a kiss.

== Cast ==
- Jaime Murray as Elizabeth Báthory / Gerri Dandridge
- Will Payne as Charley Brewster
- Sacha Parkinson as Amy Peterson
- Chris Waller as "Evil" Ed Bates
- Sean Power as Peter Vincent
- Alina Minzu as Shayla Sunshine
- Constantin Barbulescu as Inspector Constantin
- Roxana Gârleanu Lupu as Peter's Assistant

== Production ==
Touchstone greenlit the film and rushed into production at a breakneck pace. The first draft of the screenplay was written in a week and then it endured two months of revisions. Although producers of the 2011 film returned, the decision was made that the story would not follow the events of the previous films. "I thought it was a little bit of a play on the James Bond movies, where it's always James Bond, no matter who plays him," commented director Eduardo Rodriguez.

Jaime Murray is not a fan of horror films and had never seen the previous films when she was given the script. " I read about ten pages and I didn't really know whether it was meant to be funny or frightening. So I sat down and I watched Fright Night with Colin Farrell, and then I went back and I re-read the script. It was great because it gave me a point of reference, and it made me realize that even though it was really scary and dark in places, it was also funny."

Will Payne made the conscious choice not to pattern his performance after previous Charley Brewsters William Ragsdale or Anton Yelchin. "This is a whole new cast so why not try and make this my own character, my own creation?" he asked.

Filming took place over a month from November–December 2012 in Romania. Temperatures frequently lingered around -15 degrees below Fahrenheit, which caused a variety of problems. Cast and crew members shook and shivered the whole time; cameras ceased to operate as the weather froze them; the gas station explosion had to be filmed in a studio due to fire safety concerns; and during a pivotal sequence in a swimming pool, actresses Sacha Parkinson and Jaime Murray were so cold that the filmmakers halted production. "I just wanted to finish the scene but they said they had to stop it because I was going into hypothermia," said Murray. "My mouth was chattering so much that they could see it on camera and I was like, 'Can we just have one more take?', and they were like, 'No. You've got to get out the bath!'"

== Release ==
The film was released on DVD, Blu-ray and Digital HD in both rated and unrated versions on October 1, 2013. The rated version runs 31 seconds shorter, with 5 cuts of explicit gore and nudity from the scene in which Gerri lures a local woman into her lair. The DVD and Blu-ray feature identical extras: an audio commentary with director Eduardo Rodriguez and producers Alison Rosenzweig and Michael Gaeta, Fright Night webisodes and a Dracula Revealed featurette which includes interviews with principal cast and crew members.

The first film was produced by Touchstone Pictures, a subsidiary of the Walt Disney Company. The sequel was release via 20th Century Fox Home Entertainment. Following Disney's acquisition of Fox and all its subsidiaries, both films are now under one parent company.
