= Chris Sarandon =

American actor (born 1942)

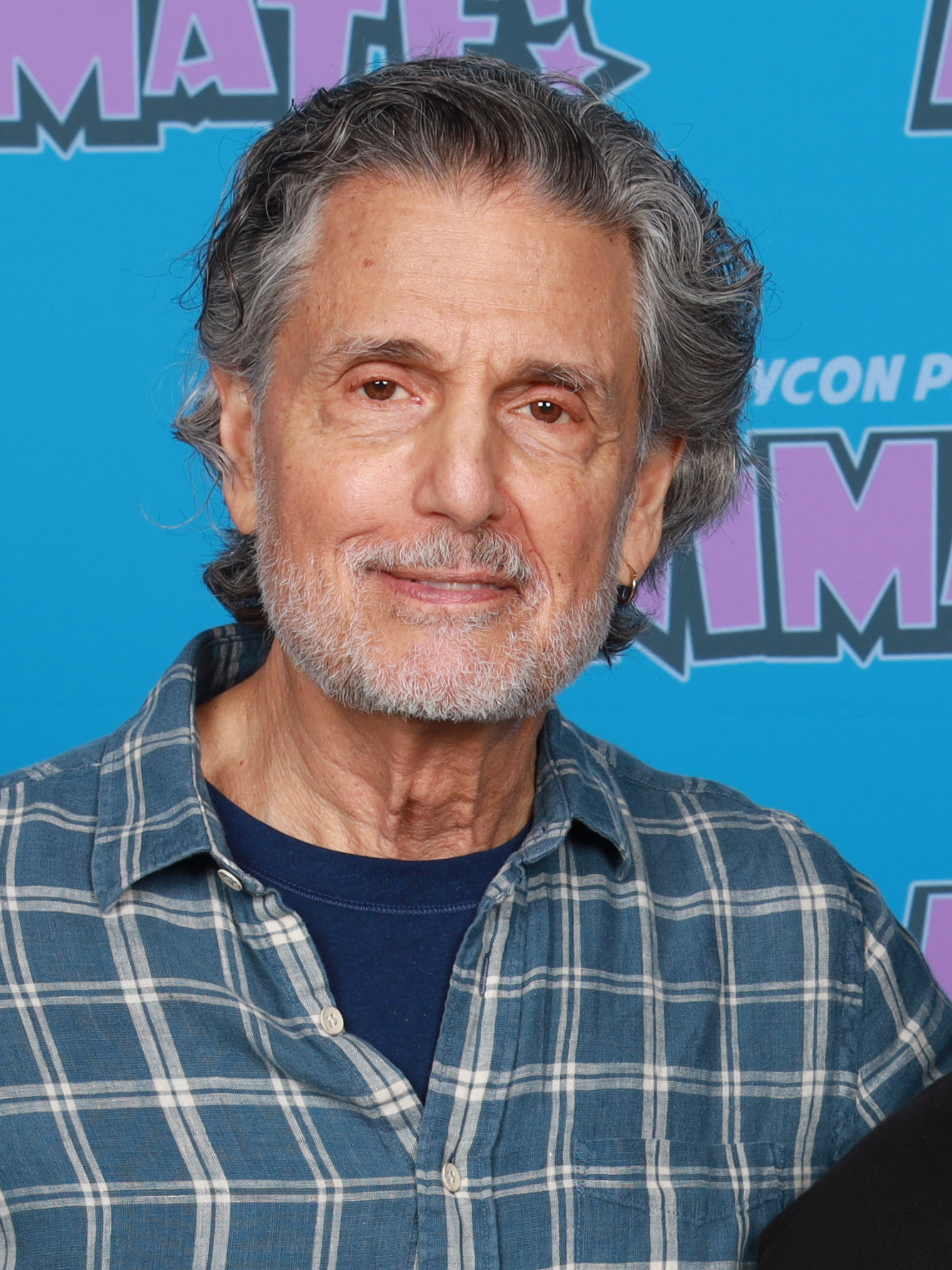
- Sarandon at Animate Columbus in 2025
- Born: Chris Sarandon; July 24, 1942 (age 84); Beckley, West Virginia, U.S.
- Education: West Virginia University (BA); Catholic University (MFA)
- Occupation: Actor
- Years active: 1965–present
- Spouses: Susan Tomalin (m. 1967; div. 1979); Lisa Ann Cooper (m. 1980; div. 1989); Joanna Gleason (m. 1994)
- Children: 3

Chris Sarandon (/səˈrændən/ sə-RAN-dən; born July 24, 1942) is an American actor. He is well known for playing Jerry Dandrige in Fright Night (1985), Prince Humperdinck in The Princess Bride (1987), Detective Mike Norris in Child's Play (1988), and Jack Skellington's speaking voice in The Nightmare Before Christmas (1993). He was nominated for the Academy Award for Best Supporting Actor for his performance as Leon Shermer in Dog Day Afternoon (1975).

== Early life ==
Christopher Sarandon was born on July 24, 1942 and raised in Beckley, West Virginia, the son of Greek-American restaurateurs Cliffie (née Cardullias) and Chris Sarandon. His father, whose surname was originally Sarondonethes (Greek: Σαραντονίδης, romanized: Sarantonídis), was born to Ottoman Greek parents in Istanbul.

Sarandon graduated from Woodrow Wilson High School in Beckley. He earned a degree in speech at West Virginia University, and earned his master's degree in theater from Catholic University of America (CUA) in Washington, D.C.

== Career ==
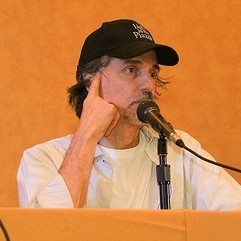
Sarandon at a convention panel in November 2008

After graduation, he toured with numerous improvisational companies and became much involved with regional theatre, making his professional debut in the play The Rose Tattoo during 1965. In the summer of 1968 he and his then-wife, Susan Sarandon, worked as actors at the Wayside Theatre in Middletown, Virginia. Later that year, Sarandon moved to New York City, where he obtained his first television role as Dr. Tom Halverson for the series The Guiding Light (1973–1974). He appeared in the primetime television films The Satan Murders (1974) and Thursday's Game before obtaining the role in Dog Day Afternoon (1975), a performance which earned him nominations for Best New Male Star of the Year at the Golden Globes and the Academy Award for Best Supporting Actor.

Sarandon appeared in the Broadway play The Rothschilds and The Two Gentlemen of Verona, as well making regular appearances at numerous Shakespeare and George Bernard Shaw festivals in the United States and Canada. He also had a series of television roles, some of which (such as A Tale of Two Cities in 1980) corresponded to his affinity for the classics. He also had roles in the thriller film Lipstick (1976) and as a demon in the film The Sentinel (1977).

To avoid being typecast in villainous roles, Sarandon accepted various roles of other types during the years to come, portraying the title role of Christ in the television film The Day Christ Died (1980). He received accolades for his portrayal of Sydney Carton in a TV-film version of A Tale of Two Cities (1980), co-starred with Dennis Hopper in the 1983 film The Osterman Weekend, which was based on the Robert Ludlum novel of the same name, and co-starred with Goldie Hawn in the film Protocol (1984). These were followed by another mainstream success as the vampire Jerry Dandrige in the horror film Fright Night (1985). He starred in the 1986 TV film Liberty, which addressed the making of the Statue of Liberty.

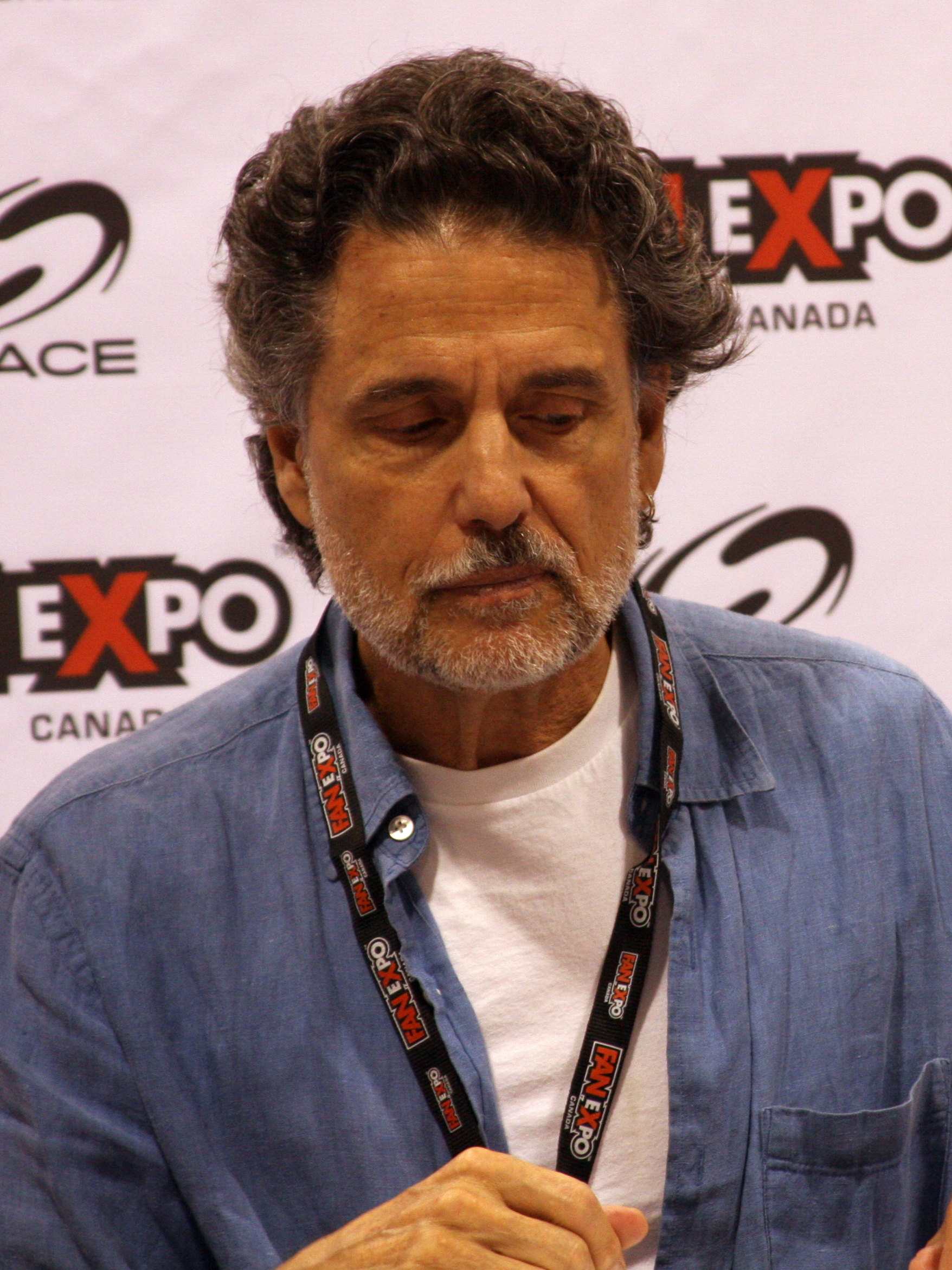
Sarandon in 2012

Chris Sarandon's other film roles include Prince Humperdinck in The Princess Bride (1987) and Mike Norris in Child's Play (1988). In 1992, he played Joseph Curwen/Charles Dexter Ward in The Resurrected. He also played Jack Skellington, the main character of the animated film The Nightmare Before Christmas (1993), and has since reprised the role in other productions, including the video games Kingdom Hearts and The Nightmare Before Christmas: Oogie's Revenge. Sarandon also reprised his role as Jack for several Disneyland Halloween events and attractions, including Halloween Screams, the Frightfully Fun Parade, and the Haunted Mansion Holiday, a three-month overlay of the Haunted Mansion.

Sarandon appeared in TV again with a recurring role as Dr. Burke on NBC's long-running medical drama ER.

In 1991 he performed on Broadway in the short-lived musical Nick & Nora (based on the film The Thin Man) with Joanna Gleason, the daughter of Monty Hall. Sarandon married Gleason in 1994. They have appeared together in a number of films, including Edie & Pen (1996), American Perfekt (1997), and Let the Devil Wear Black (1999). During the 2000s he made guest appearances in several TV series, notably as the Necromancer demon, Armand, in Charmed, and as superior court judge Barry Krumble for six episodes of Judging Amy.

In 2006 he played Signor Naccarelli in the six-time Tony Award-winning Broadway musical play The Light in the Piazza at Lincoln Center. Most recently he appeared in Cyrano de Bergerac as Antoine de Guiche, with Kevin Kline, Jennifer Garner, and Daniel Sunjata.

In 2016 he performed in the Off-Broadway production of the Dave Malloy musical Preludes as Anton Chekhov, Tchaikovsky, Alexander Glazunov, Leo Tolstoy, Tsar Nicholas II, and The Master.

He is on the advisory board for the Greenbrier Valley Theatre in Lewisburg, West Virginia.

== Personal life ==
Sarandon has been married three times. He married actress Susan Tomalin on September 16, 1967; she took his surname, thus becoming Susan Sarandon. The two met while attending Catholic University of America together in Washington, D.C. The marriage lasted for twelve years; the pair separated in 1975 and divorced in 1979.

He married his second wife, fashion model Lisa Ann Cooper, in 1980. The couple had two daughters and one son. After nine years, the marriage ended in divorce in 1989.

In 1994, he married his third wife, actress and singer Joanna Gleason. The couple met while performing in Broadway's short-lived 1991 musical Nick & Nora; they returned to the stage together in 1998's Thorn and Bloom. They also collaborated in several films together, such as Road Ends, Edie & Pen, Let the Devil Wear Black, and American Perfekt.

Sarandon is a member of the Greek Orthodox Church.

== Filmography ==
=== Film ===
Year	Title	Role	Notes/Awards
1974	Thursday's Game	Tom (The Counsellor)	
1975	Dog Day Afternoon	Leon Shermer	Nominated—Academy Award for Best Supporting Actor; Nominated—Golden Globe Award for New Star of the Year – Actor; Nominated—New York Film Critics Circle Award for Best Supporting Actor
1976	Lipstick	Gordon Stuart	
1977	The Sentinel	Michael Lerman	
1979	Cuba	Juan Pulido	
1979	You Can't Go Home Again	George Webber	
1980	The Day Christ Died	Jesus Christ	
1980	A Tale of Two Cities	Sydney Carton; Charles Darnay	
1981	Broken Promise	Bud Griggs	
1983	The Osterman Weekend	Joseph Cardone	
1984	Protocol	Michael Ransome	
1985	This Child Is Mine	Craig Wilkerson	
1985	Fright Night	Jerry Dandrige	Nominated—Saturn Award for Best Actor
1986	Liberty	Jacque Marchant	
1987	The Princess Bride	Prince Humperdinck	
1987	Mayflower Madam	Matt Whittington	
1988	Child's Play	Detective Mike Norris	
1988	Goodbye, Miss Fourth of July	George Janus	
1989	Collision Course	Philip Mandras	
1989	Slaves of New York	Victor Okrent	
1989	Tailspin: Behind the Korean Airliner Tragedy	John Lenczowski	
1989	Forced March	Ben Kline	
1990	The Stranger Within	Dan	
1990	Whispers	Tony	
1991	The Resurrected	Joseph Curwen; Charles Dexter Ward	
1993	Dark Tide	Tim	
1993	The Nightmare Before Christmas	Jack Skellington (voice)	Speaking voice
1994	David's Mother	Philip	
1995	Just Cause	Lyle Morgan	
1995	When the Dark Man Calls	Lloyd Carson	
1996	Terminal Justice	Reginald Matthews	
1996	No Greater Love	Sam Horowitz	
1996	Edie & Pen	Max	
1996	Bordello of Blood	Rev. J.C. Current	
1997	American Perfekt	Deputy Sammy	
1997	Road Ends	Esteban Maceda	
1998	Little Men	Fritz Bhaer	
1999	Let the Devil Wear Black	Mr. Lyne	
2000	Race Against Time	Dr. Anton Stofeles	
2000	Reaper	Luke Sinclair	
2001	Perfume	Gary Packer	
2005	Nausicaä of the Valley of the Wind	Kurotowa (voice)	English dub by Walt Disney Pictures; originally released in Japanese in 1984
2005	Loggerheads	Rev. Robert Austin	
2007	The Chosen One	Zebulon Kirk (voice)	
2008	My Sassy Girl	Dr. Roark	
2010	Multiple Sarcasms	Larry	
2011	Fright Night	"Jay Dee"	Cameo appearance
2012	Safe	Mayor Danny Tremello	
2013	Curse of Chucky	Detective Mike Norris	Archive footage
2013	Frank the Bastard	Tristan Pace	
2014	Big Stone Gap	Mario Barbari	
2015	I Smile Back	Roger	

=== Television ===
Year	Title	Role	Notes
1969–1973	Guiding Light	Dr. Tom Halverson	
1978	You Can't Go Home Again	George Webber	Television film
1980	A Tale of Two Cities	Sydney Carton; Charles Darnay	Television film
1993	Picket Fences	Cole	Episode: "The Dancing Bandit"
1994	Star Trek: Deep Space Nine	Martus Mazur	Episode: "Rivals"
1995	The Outer Limits	Dr. Pallas	Episode: "Corner of the Eye"
1997	Adventures from the Book of Virtues	Jim Dellingham-Young (voice)	Episode: "Generosity"
1998	The Practice	Dr Jeffrey Winslow	2 episodes
1998	Chicago Hope	Dr. Gordon Mays	3 episodes
1999	Felicity	Dr. Peter McGrath	5 episodes
1999–2000	Stark Raving Mad	Caesar Radford	2 episodes
2000–2002	ER	Dr. Burke	3 episodes
2002, 2004	Law & Order	Defense Attorney Howard Pincham	2 episodes
2002	The Court	Justice Vorhees	3 episodes
2003	The Wild Thornberrys	Myka (voice)	Episode: "Look Who's Squawking"
2003	Skin	Mayor Coolidge	Episode: "Endorsement"
2003	Charmed	Necromancer; Armand	Episode: "Necromancing the Stone"
2004	Cold Case	Adam Clarke	Episode: "Volunteers"
2005	Danny Phantom	Matt (voice)	Episode: "Pirate Radio"
2006	Law & Order: Special Victims Unit	Wesley Masoner	Episode: "Choreographed"
2010	Psych	Ashton Bonaventure	Episode: "Think Tank"
2010	The Good Wife	Judge Howard Matchick	Episode: "Taking Control"
2016	Orange Is the New Black	Kip Carnigan	Episode: "We'll Always Have Baltimore"
2017	Teenage Mutant Ninja Turtles	Count Dracula (voice)	3 episodes
2020	Prop Culture	Himself	Episode: "Tim Burton's The Nightmare Before Christmas"

=== Theatre ===
Year	Title	Role	Notes
1965	The Rose Tattoo	Jack Hunter	Broadway
1970	The Rothschilds	Jacob Rothschild	Broadway
1971	Two Gentlemen of Verona	Proteus	Broadway
1977	Marco Polo Sings a Solo	Tom Wintermouth	Off-Broadway
1978	Broadway	Performer	Broadway
1979	The Woods	Nick	Off-Broadway
1980	Censored Scenes From King Kong	Benchgelter	Broadway
1985	The Voice of the Turtle	Bill Page	Off-Broadway
1991	Nick & Nora	Performer	Broadway
2005	The Light in the Piazza	Signor Naccarelli	Broadway
2007	Cyrano de Bergerac	Comte de Guiche	Broadway revival
2011	Through a Glass, Darkly	Performer	Off-Broadway
2012	The Exonerated	Karry Max Cook	Broadway
2015	Preludes	Chekhov, Tchaikovsky, Tolstoy, Glazunov, Tsar Nicholas II, The Master	Off-Broadway

=== Video games ===
Year	Title	Voice role	Notes
2002	Kingdom Hearts	Jack Skellington	
2005	The Nightmare Before Christmas: Oogie's Revenge	Jack Skellington	
2006	Kingdom Hearts II	Jack Skellington	
2013	Disney Infinity	Jack Skellington	
2013	Kingdom Hearts HD 1.5 Remix	Jack Skellington	
2014	Kingdom Hearts HD 2.5 Remix	Jack Skellington	
2015	Disney Infinity 3.0	Jack Skellington	
2023	Disney Dreamlight Valley	Jack Skellington	
2024	Disney Speedstorm	Jack Skellington	

=== Theme parks and live attractions ===
- Haunted Mansion Holiday – Jack Skellington
- Halloween Screams – Jack Skellington
- Frightfully Fun Parade – Jack Skellington
- Disney on Ice – Jack Skellington

=== Music videos ===
- Hands Clean — Alanis Morissette

== Awards and nominations ==
Awards and nominations
Year	Award	Category	Title	Result
1975	NYFCC Award	Best Supporting Actor	Dog Day Afternoon	Nominated
1975	Golden Globe	New Star of the Year – Actor	Dog Day Afternoon	Nominated
1976	Academy Award	Best Actor in a Supporting Role	Dog Day Afternoon	Nominated
1986	Saturn Award	Best Actor	Fright Night	Nominated
1992	Chainsaw Award	Best Supporting Actor	The Resurrected	Nominated
