= Fright Night (2011 film) =

2011 film by Craig Gillespie

- Theatrical release poster
- Directed by: Craig Gillespie
- Screenplay by: Marti Noxon
- Story by: Tom Holland
- Based on: Fright Night by Tom Holland
- Produced by: Michael De Luca; Alison Rosenzweig
- Starring: Anton Yelchin; Colin Farrell; Christopher Mintz-Plasse; David Tennant; Imogen Poots; Toni Collette
- Cinematography: Javier Aguirresarobe
- Edited by: Tatiana S. Riegel
- Music by: Ramin Djawadi
- Production companies: DreamWorks Pictures; Michael De Luca Productions; Gaeta/Rosenzweig Films
- Distributed by: Walt Disney Studios Motion Pictures (Note: Distributed by Walt Disney Studios Motion Pictures through the Touchstone Pictures banner.)
- Release dates: August 14, 2011 (The O2 premiere); August 19, 2011 (United States)
- Running time: 106 minutes
- Country: United States
- Language: English
- Budget: $30 million
- Box office: $41 million

Fright Night is a 2011 American supernatural horror film directed by Craig Gillespie and produced by Michael De Luca and Alison Rosenzweig. A remake of Tom Holland's 1985 film, the film's screenplay was adapted by Marti Noxon. It features Anton Yelchin, Colin Farrell, Toni Collette, Imogen Poots, Christopher Mintz-Plasse, and David Tennant. The plot follows a boy who discovers that his neighbor is actually a vampire, which culminates in a battle between the two.

The film held its world premiere at The O2 in London on August 14, 2011. It was released in the United States by Touchstone Pictures on August 19, 2011.

The film received generally positive reviews from critics and grossed $41 million against a production budget of $30 million. A direct-to-video homage sequel, Fright Night 2: New Blood, was released in 2013.

== Plot ==
Charley Brewster is a boy living in a suburb of Las Vegas, Nevada, who discovers that a new neighbor has moved in next door. Charley's old best friend, Edward "Evil Ed" Lee, informs him that many students have gone missing, including their other longtime friend, Adam Johnson. When Charley goes home after school, his mother, Jane, introduces him to Jerry, their new neighbor. Angry with Ed after he claims that Jerry is a vampire, Charley tells him that he is crazy and that he does not want to be friends anymore.

On his way home, Ed is confronted by Jerry, who claims that he has been watching Ed and has been aware of Ed watching him. Jerry soon chases Ed into a nearby pool and convinces him into believing that his life would be much better if he were a vampire. Ed succumbs and willingly allows Jerry to bite him. The next day, Charley realizes that Ed is missing and decides to investigate, starting to believe Ed's claims when he discovers video recordings of objects moving on their own, with Ed's voiceover revealing that he is recording Jerry to prove that his reflection does not show up in recordings. As Jerry begins to attack more people throughout the neighborhood, Charley sneaks into Jerry's house and finds out that he keeps his victims in secret rooms. Charley goes to Las Vegas magician Peter Vincent, a supposed expert on vampires. Peter, however, does not take him seriously and has him leave.

Jerry comes to Charley's house and sets fire to it. Charley, Jane, and his girlfriend, Amy Peterson, flee through the desert in their minivan. Jerry catches up with them but is later wounded by Jane with a real estate sign stake. Jane is admitted to a hospital, where Peter contacts Charley and agrees to meet with him after recognizing a sigil via a photo that Charley took at Jerry's house. Upon arriving at Peter's penthouse, they are informed that the species of vampire Jerry belongs to is cannibalistic when Ed turns up. By now, Ed has been fully transformed into a vampire and he aids Jerry in attacking Charley, Amy, and Peter. As they fight, Ed lets all of his anger out and Charley reluctantly kills Ed. Meanwhile, Amy shoots Jerry with silver bullets, which are rather ineffective, but then injures Jerry with holy water. They then run into a club, where they get separated in the crowd. Amy is kissed and bitten by Jerry, who proceeds to abduct her.

Peter refuses to help Charley and reveals that both of his parents were killed by a vampire (later revealed to be Jerry himself). He does, however, give Charley a stake blessed by Saint Michael that will kill Jerry and turn all of his victims back into humans. Charley goes to Jerry's house, where Peter decides to join him after all.

They are led into Jerry's basement, where they are attacked by many of Jerry's victims, including Amy. Charley confronts Amy and she explains how they can be with each other forever. Just as she is about to bite Charley, he stabs her, intentionally missing her heart, and then escaping. Meanwhile, Peter is ambushed by Jerry and many of his victims. Peter is able to kill a few before his weapon backfires. Charley returns to the basement, only to see Peter being fed on by the remaining vampires. He decides to shoot holes in the roof, from which sunlight shines in and kills them. The patch of sunlight guards both Charley and Peter from the vampires who had not been destroyed. Jerry appears, explaining that Charley's quest is, in fact, over. Charley, having outfitted himself in a flame-retardant suit, has Peter light him on fire and tackles Jerry just as Amy is feeding on him. A struggle between the two ensues while the other vampires watch. Peter assists him by shooting another hole in the floor above to allow more sunlight in. This burns Jerry, and Peter tosses Charley the stake he had dropped. Charley quickly stabs Jerry in his visible heart, killing him, and returning his victims to their human form. Afterwards, Jane recovers and goes to shop for a new house.

== Cast ==
- Anton Yelchin as Charley Brewster
- Colin Farrell as Jerry
- Christopher Mintz-Plasse as Edward "Evil Ed" Lee
- David Tennant as Peter Vincent
- Imogen Poots as Amy Peterson
- Toni Collette as Jane Brewster
- Dave Franco as Mark
- Emily Montague as Doris
- Will Denton as Adam Johnson
- Reid Ewing as Ben
- Sandra Vergara as Ginger
- Lisa Loeb as Victoria Lee
- Brian Huskey as Rick Lee
- Grace Phipps as Bee
- Dee Bradley Baker as Vampires (vocals)

Chris Sarandon, who portrayed Jerry in the original film, makes a cameo appearance as a motorist killed by the vampire (his character is credited as "Jay Dee", after the initials of his original character).

== Production ==
Principal photography of Charley, Ed and Jerry's houses and neighborhood began in Rio Rancho, New Mexico, a suburb Northwest of Albuquerque, New Mexico, the scenes of Peter Vincent on stage were shot at the National Hispanic Cultural Center in Albuquerque, New Mexico and the scenes involving the Hard Rock Casino, Las Vegas were actually shot at the now defunct Hard Rock Casino, Isleta, New Mexico, with Las Vegas set as the backdrop on July 26, 2010, and wrapped on October 1, 2010. Fright Night was produced by DreamWorks Pictures and distributed worldwide by Walt Disney Studios Motion Pictures through the Touchstone Pictures label. The film was the first of two collaborations between Anton Yelchin and Imogen Poots, with the second and final being Green Room.

Steven Spielberg provided a great deal of input in the making of the film, such as storyboarding scenes and assistance with editing.

== Soundtrack ==
Fright Night: Original Motion Picture Soundtrack

Soundtrack album by Ramin Djawadi
- Released: August 30, 2011
- Genre: Film score
- Length: 50:40
- Label: Varèse Sarabande
- Producer: Ramin Djawadi

Ramin Djawadi chronology
Game of Thrones: Season 1 (2011)	Fright Night: Original Motion Picture Soundtrack (2011)	Safe House (2012)

Ramin Djawadi composed the score to the film.

=== Track listing ===
No.	Title	Length
1.	"Welcome to Fright Night"	1:13
2.	"There's a Lot of Bad People Out There"	1:03
3.	"Jerry's Date"	5:12
4.	"A Terrible Vampire Name"	2:46
5.	"We Could Rock This Evil Thing Together"	3:44
6.	"Is That a Stake?"	1:21
7.	"400 Years of Survival"	3:10
8.	"How to Kill a Vampire"	1:42
9.	"Just Hit Me"	1:27
10.	"No House, No Invitation"	3:44
11.	"That's a Mighty Big Cross"	2:49
12.	"Let's Kill Something"	1:00
13.	"Go Get the Authorities"	1:59
14.	"I Can Hear You Breathe"	2:56
15.	"I'm All Out of Beer"	3:50
16.	"A Garlicky Omelet"	1:21
17.	"Enough With the Vampires"	3:09
18.	"Gotta Light"	2:49
19.	"Don't Do Anything I Wouldn't Do"	1:13
20.	"Fright Night"	4:12
Total length:		50:40

== Release ==
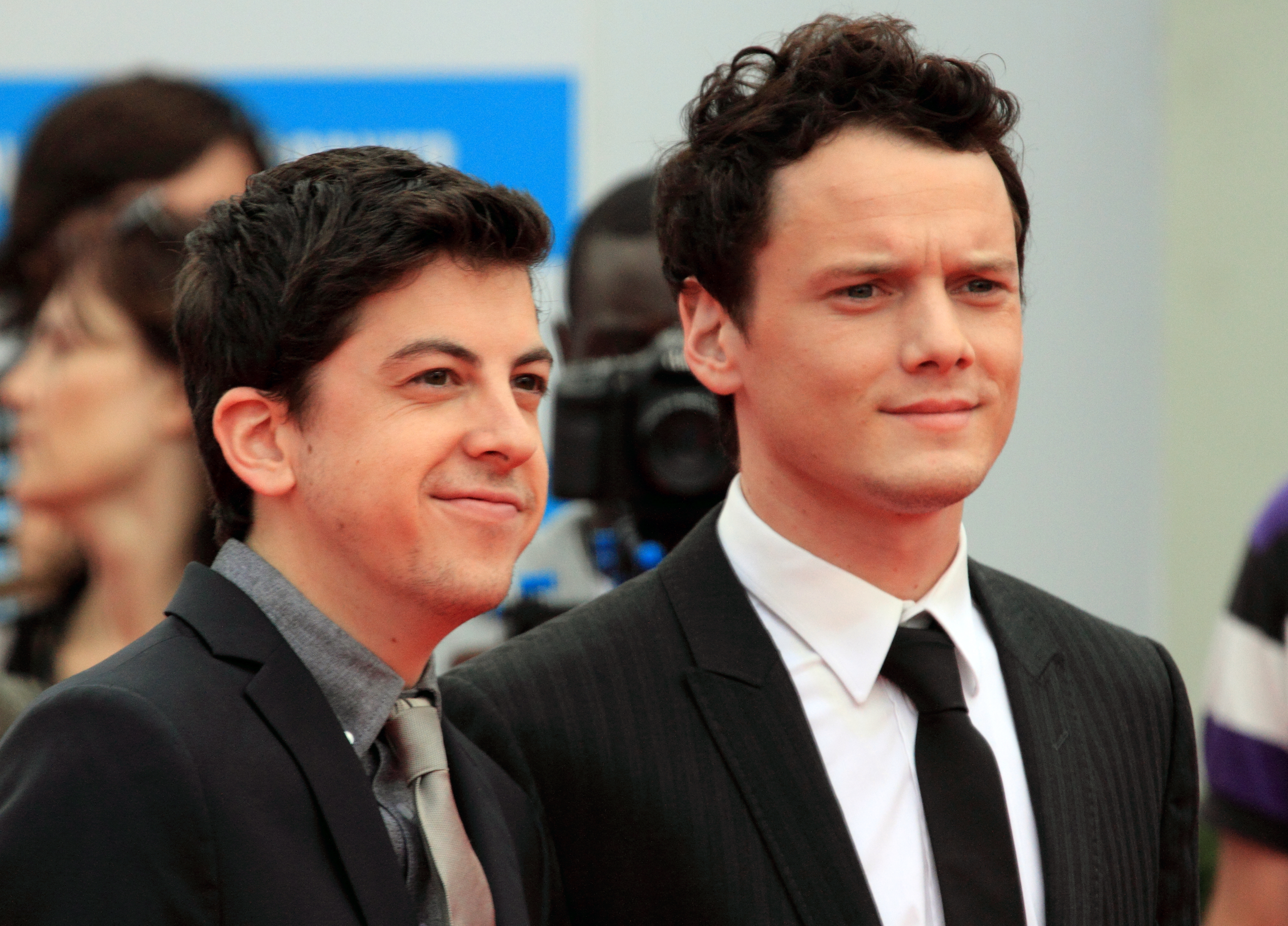
Christopher Mintz-Plasse and Anton Yelchin at a screening of Fright Night at the Deauville American Film Festival in September 2011

Although the film received a wide release in the United States on August 19, 2011, an advance screening took place at San Diego Comic-Con on July 22, 2011.

=== Home media ===
The film was released by Touchstone Home Entertainment on Blu-ray Disc, Blu-ray 3D, DVD, and digital download on December 13, 2011. The release was produced in three different physical packages: a 3-disc combo pack (Blu-ray 3D, Blu-ray, and DVD with Digital Copy); a 2-disc combo pack (Blu-ray Disc and DVD); and a one-disc DVD. The film was also released digitally in 3D, high definition, and standard definition. The DVD version will include the "Gag Reel" and "Squid Man – Extended and Uncut" bonus features, as well as an uncensored music video for Kid Cudi's song "No One Believes Me". The digital download version will include the same features as the DVD version, plus "Live in Las Vegas: An Interview with Peter Vincent" and "The Official 'How to Make a Funny Vampire Movie' Guide" bonus features. Both the 2-disc and 3-disc combo packs will include five deleted scenes with introductions by director Gillespie, a gag reel, an uncensored music video for "No One Believes Me", "Squid Man – Extended & Uncut", "Peter Vincent: Swim Inside My Mind", "The Official 'How to Make a Funny Vampire Movie' Guide" and "Frightful Facts & Terrifying Trivia" bonus features.

== Reception ==
=== Critical response ===
Review aggregator Rotten Tomatoes calculated that 72% of the 181 reviews for the film were positive and the average rating was 6.3/10. The site's critical consensus reads, "It may not have been necessary to remake the 1985 cult classic, but the new Fright Night benefits from terrific performances by Colin Farrell and David Tennant – and it's smart, funny, and stylishly gory to boot." On Metacritic, which assigns a weighted average score out to reviews from mainstream critics, gives the film a score of 64 out of 100, based on 30 critics, indicating "generally favorable" reviews. CinemaScore polls reported that the average grade moviegoers gave the film was a "B−" on an A+ to F scale.

Robert Koehler of Variety writes, Fright Night has "a cleverly balanced mix of scares and laughs".

=== Box office ===
Fright Night opened in number six in the box office. The film grossed $7,714,388 in its opening weekend and finished with a domestic grossing of $18,302,607 and $22,700,000 in other countries, giving a worldwide total of $41,002,607 against its $30 million budget.

=== Accolades ===
Year	Award	Category	Recipient(s)	Result
2011	Fright Meter Award	Best Supporting Actor	David Tennant	Nominated
2011	Fright Meter Award	Best Makeup	Fright Night	Nominated
2011	Golden Schmoes Award	Best Horror Movie of the Year	Fright Night	Nominated
2011	IGN Summer Movie Award	Best Horror Movie	Fright Night	Nominated
2012	Fangoria Chainsaw Award	Best Wide-Release Film	Fright Night (Tied for runner-up with Shark Night)	Runner-up
2012	Fangoria Chainsaw Award	Worst Film	Fright Night (Tied for runner-up with Shark Night)	Runner-up
2012	Golden Trailer Award	Best Horror TV Spot	DreamWorks Pictures; Walt Disney Studios Motion Pictures; The AV Squad for "Fear the Night Awards"	Nominated
2012	Taurus World Stunt Award	Best Fire Work	Mark Aaron Wagner; Chris Brewster	Won
2012	Taurus World Stunt Award	Best Fire Stunt	Mark Aaron Wagner; Chris Brewster	Won

== Homage sequel ==
A straight-to-video homage sequel titled Fright Night 2: New Blood was filmed in Romania. It stars Will Payne, Jaime Murray, Sean Power, Sacha Parkinson, and Chris Waller. The film was released direct to DVD on October 1, 2013. Though billed as a sequel, the film repeats the plot of the original and remake, with none of the 2011 cast, and no reference is made to events in the previous film (for example, the character of Evil Ed, killed in Fright Night, is alive in the "sequel").

== See also ==
- Vampire film
- List of films set in Las Vegas
