= Thursday's Game =

- Also known as: The Birk
- Genre: Comedy
- Written by: James L. Brooks
- Directed by: Robert Moore
- Starring: Gene Wilder; Ellen Burstyn; Bob Newhart; Cloris Leachman; Nancy Walker; Valerie Harper; Norman Fell; Rob Reiner; Martha Scott
- Music by: Billy Goldenberg
- Country of origin: United States
- Original language: English

Production
- Producer: James L. Brooks
- Cinematography: Joseph Biroc
- Editors: Diane Adler; Fredric Steinkamp
- Running time: 100 minutes
- Production company: ABC Circle Films

Original release
- Network: ABC
- Release: April 14, 1974

Thursday's Game (also known as The Berk) is a 1974 American made-for-television comedy film starring Gene Wilder and Bob Newhart, written by James L. Brooks and directed by Robert Moore. Though filmed in 1971, it was originally broadcast April 14, 1974, on ABC.

In addition to Wilder and Newhart, Thursday's Game starred many actors familiar to 1970s television viewers including John Archer, Ellen Burstyn, Norman Fell, Cloris Leachman, Valerie Harper, Rob Reiner, Richard Schaal, Martha Scott and Nancy Walker. The film was lauded by critics for its perceptive look at adult relationships, and furthered James L. Brooks's reputation as a writer and producer.

== Plot ==
Harry Evers and Marvin Ellison are long time friends who meet each Thursday to play poker and get away from their wives Lynn and Lois. After the weekly game breaks up over a disagreement, the two men decide to continue meeting for other activities, which leads to friendship and rivalry as the men's lives take on very different paths.

== Cast ==
- Gene Wilder as Harry Evers
- Bob Newhart as Marvin Ellison
- Ellen Burstyn as Lynn Evers
- Cloris Leachman as Lois Ellison
- Martha Scott as Mrs. Reynolds
- Nancy Walker as Mrs. Bender
- Valerie Harper as Ann Menzente
- Rob Reiner as Joel Forester
- Norman Fell as Melvin Leonard
- Ric Mancini as Bartender
