= Fright Night =

1985 film by Tom Holland

- Theatrical release poster
- Directed by: Tom Holland
- Written by: Tom Holland
- Produced by: Herb Jaffe
- Starring: Chris Sarandon; William Ragsdale; Amanda Bearse; Stephen Geoffreys; Roddy McDowall
- Cinematography: Jan Kiesser
- Edited by: Kent Beyda
- Music by: Brad Fiedel
- Production company: Vistar Films
- Distributed by: Columbia Pictures
- Release date: August 2, 1985
- Running time: 106 minutes
- Country: United States
- Language: English
- Budget: $7–$9.25 million
- Box office: $24.9 million

Fright Night is a 1985 American supernatural horror film written and directed by Tom Holland, in his directorial debut. The film follows teenager Charley Brewster (played by William Ragsdale), who discovers that his next-door neighbor Jerry Dandrige (Chris Sarandon) is a vampire. When no one else believes him, Charley decides to get Peter Vincent (Roddy McDowall), a horror host who acted in films as a vampire hunter, to stop Jerry.

The film was released on August 2, 1985, by Columbia Pictures, and grossed $24.9 million at the box office. Since its release, it has received positive reviews from critics, becoming a cult classic and spawning the media franchise of the same name. Fright Night was followed by a sequel, Fright Night Part 2, in 1988 and a remake of the same name in 2011.

== Plot ==
Seventeen-year-old Charley Brewster is an avid fan of Fright Night, a late-night horror television program hosted by Peter Vincent, an actor famous for portraying vampire hunters. When the mysterious Jerry Dandrige moves in next door, Charley witnesses suspicious activity and becomes convinced that his new neighbor is a vampire responsible for several disappearances.

Charley's suspicions become dismissed by his mother Judy, his girlfriend Amy Peterson and his best friend Edward "Evil Ed" Thompson. Desperate for help, Charley contacts the police, but his claims are met with skepticism after Jerry's housemate, Billy Cole, tells a detective that Jerry is away on business. Matters worsen when Judy unknowingly invites Jerry into their home, allowing him to enter freely. Later that night, Jerry confronts Charley in his bedroom and threatens to murder him unless he stops interfering in his affairs.

With no one else to turn to, Charley seeks help from Peter Vincent, believing him to be a genuine vampire hunter. Peter, however, dismisses Charley as a delusional fan. Concerned about Charley's increasingly erratic behavior, Amy persuades Peter to participate in a scheme intended to disprove his suspicions. Peter agrees to administer ordinary tap water passed off as holy water to Jerry, who drinks it without incident. The plan appears successful until Peter notices Jerry's lack of a reflection in his pocket mirror. Startled, Peter drops the mirror and flees, leaving behind a broken shard that alerts Jerry to his discovery.

Realizing that he has been found out, Jerry begins targeting those closest to Charley. He attacks Ed and vampirificates him before confronting Peter, who manages to repel him with a crucifix. Meanwhile, Jerry pursues Charley and Amy to a nightclub, where he hypnotizes the latter and abducts her. Drawn to her resemblance to a former lover, Jerry begins vampirificating her as well.

Determined to rescue Amy, Charley once again appeals to Peter for help. Although terrified, Peter reluctantly agrees to accompany him to Jerry's house. Their initial confrontation goes badly – Peter discovers that his crucifix is ineffective because he lacks genuine faith in its power, while Charley successfully uses his own to ward off Jerry. Billy intervenes, knocking Charley over a banister and forcing Peter to flee.

Seeking refuge in the Brewster home, Peter encounters Ed, who transforms into a wolf and attacks him. Peter manages to kill him by driving a broken table leg through his heart. Regaining his courage, Peter returns to Jerry's house, where he frees Charley, who has been trapped alongside the slowly vampirificating Amy. Together, they confront and destroy Billy, revealing his own supernatural nature.

Now possessing renewed faith, Peter successfully uses his crucifix against Jerry, forcing him toward a window as morning approaches. Jerry transforms into a bat and attacks the duo before retreating to his coffin in the basement. Peter and Charley pursue him, but Amy, whose vampirification is nearly complete, attempts to stop them. While Peter struggles to stake Jerry, Charley breaks through the basement's blacked-out windows, flooding the room with sunlight as Jerry is vanquished and Amy's humanity is restored.

Several nights later, Peter resumes hosting Fright Night, announcing that he is taking a break from vampire films in favor of a story about alien invaders. Watching the broadcast from his bedroom, Charley embraces Amy, apparently having returned to a normal life. However, he briefly notices a pair of glowing red eyes watching from Jerry's supposedly vacant house. Dismissing the sight, he turns away and resumes kissing Amy. The eyes reappear, accompanied by Ed's familiar voice complimenting Charley.

== Cast ==
- Chris Sarandon as Jerry Dandrige
- William Ragsdale as Charley Brewster, Amy's boyfriend
- Amanda Bearse as Amy Peterson, Charley's girlfriend
- Roddy McDowall as Peter Vincent
- Stephen Geoffreys as Edward "Evil Ed" Thompson, Charley's best friend
- Jonathan Stark as Billy Cole
- Dorothy Fielding as Judy Brewster, Charley's mother
- Art J. Evans as Detective Lennox
- Stewart Stern as a cook
- Robert Corff as Jonathan
- Pamela Brown as Miss Nina

Nick Savage and Ernie Holmes portrayed bouncers murdered by Jerry. Heidi Sorenson additionally appeared as a prostitute, one of Jerry's victims.

== Production ==
=== Development ===
While writing the script for Cloak & Dagger, Tom Holland amused himself when he conceived the idea of a horror-movie fan becoming convinced that his next-door neighbor was a vampire, but he did not initially think this premise was enough to sustain a story. "What's he gonna do", Holland asked, "because everybody's gonna think he's mad!" The story percolated in his mind for a year and finally one day while discussing it with John Byers, then the head of story department at Columbia Pictures, he finally figured out what the boy would do. "Of course, he's gonna go to Vincent Price!" In that era, many local TV stations in the United States had horror hosts (such as Zacherle, Svengoolie, and the nationally syndicated Elvira), so Holland decided it would be natural for the boy to seek aid from his local host. "The minute I had Peter Vincent, I had the story. Charley Brewster was the engine, but Peter Vincent was the heart." Once he'd conceived that character, Holland knocked out the first draft of the script in three weeks. "And I was laughing the entire time, literally on the floor, kicking my feet in the air in hysterics."

Holland wrote the film for himself to direct, in part because he was so disheartened by the film that was ultimately made from his previous screenplay, Scream for Help, and he had developed enough clout from the successes of his screenplays for Class of 1984, Psycho II, and Cloak & Dagger that the head of Columbia Pictures said, "Let's take a chance on the hot screenwriter kid", not figuring that Fright Night would be as successful as it ultimately became.

=== Casting ===
The Peter Vincent character was named after horror icons Peter Cushing and Vincent Price, and Holland specifically wrote the part for Price, but at this point in his career, Price had been so badly typecast that he had stopped accepting roles in horror movies. Guy McElwaine, then the head of Columbia Pictures, suggested Roddy McDowall for the part. McDowall had already starred in the Holland-penned film Class of 1984, so Holland was immediately receptive to the suggestion. "He understood the part", commented Holland, "and he also understood what he could do with it, and he really wanted it!" McDowall was particularly interested in the genesis of the character. "In the film, I perform as being in my late 20s or early 30s in the film clips of my old movies-all the way up to my 60s, when I'm the washed-up has-been", McDowall adding that the role interested him because, "I'd never played anything that old." Holland and McDowall built a lasting friendship, and McDowall eventually invited Holland to a dinner party where he introduced him to Vincent Price, who was flattered that the part was an homage to him and commented that the film "was wonderful and he thought Roddy did a wonderful job."

Chris Sarandon's agent gave him a copy of the script and he replied, "there's no way I can do a horror movie," but he decided to give the script a once-over and was immediately captivated by it. "I thought this is one of the best scripts I've read in a long time", Sarandon said, "beautifully constructed, it was obvious that this was a labor of love, it was clear that the writer/director's approach to it was one of wanting to have fun with the genre without making fun of it, the characters were beautifully drawn." Sarandon was worried about being typecast as a villain, but the script resonated with him because the story was deeper than just an average monster movie. "Forgetting about vampirism, what this film is about on one level is an older man trying to take a younger man's girl away from him", commented Holland. Although he liked the screenplay, Sarandon was still leery of working with a first-time director, so he flew to Los Angeles to meet Tom Holland and producer Herb Jaffe. Holland and he had an immediate rapport (and went on to make several more films together), and Sarandon was awed that Holland had the film so completely mapped out that he "literally described the movie shot-by-shot all the way through – page-by-page, scene-by-scene. It was basically the way he shot it."

Jonathan Stark was not a fan of vampire films, but he also liked the script. The Billy Cole character was written as a hulking giant, so Stark padded himself with extra clothing when he went in to audition. At auditions, he read the scene in which he is being questioned by the detective, which was written to be played straight. "I'm thinking if I'm sitting there being evil", Stark commented, "the lieutenant's gonna get suspicious. Why not throw him off the trail by being funny?" Holland liked his take on the character, and Stark was told that he had the part – but because he came in to read at the start of the audition process, months passed before filming commenced and Stark worried that he had lost the role. The gap worked to his advantage, however, because it gave him time to hit the gym and bulk up so he would not have to wear padding in the film.

William Ragsdale had auditioned to portray Rocky Dennis in Mask, but he lost the role to Eric Stoltz. Casting director Jackie Burch remembered his audition though, and thought he would be right to portray Charley Brewster. Ragsdale auditioned several times and ultimately received the news that he had landed the part on Halloween night 1984, beating out several other future-stars like Charlie Sheen.

Due to a mix-up, Stephen Geoffreys had an awkward audition for Anthony Michael Hall's role in Weird Science, and he made an indelible impression on Jackie Burch, who suggested him for Fright Night. Although he was not a horror-movie fan, Geoffreys loved the script, so he called his agent and emphatically declared that he would love to audition for Charley Brewster. "No, Steve", his agent replied, "you're wanted for the part of Evil Ed." Geoffreys was simultaneously baffled and heartbroken. "What do they see in me that they think I should be this... well anyway, it worked out."

The most difficult role to cast was Amy Peterson. "There wasn't the perfect girl next door until Amanda Bearse walked in", Holland commented.

=== Pre-production ===
Once his cast was in place, Holland got input from each of the actors and made numerous revisions to the script. Some were slight and others were major – such as the ending, which originally featured Peter Vincent transforming into a vampire as he returned to host Fright Night. The September 6, 1984, draft of the screenplay, which is circulating online, is very close to the final cut of the film, but a few more changes were still to come.

The cast and crew were given the luxury of having two weeks of rehearsal time in late November 1984 prior to filming. Holland blocked out the scenes on a soundstage and the cast performed the entire film like it was a stage play. Having begun his career as a classically trained actor, Holland encouraged the cast to write biographies of their characters so they would completely understand their motivations and be able to draw on that information while filming their scenes. All of the kinks in the story/performances were ironed out during the rehearsal period, so when time to film came, Holland only shot two or three takes of each scene and then moved on.

As originally written, Jerry Dandrige was more villainous, so Sarandon tried to find various ways to humanize the vampire, including suggesting the implication that the Amy character was the reincarnation of his long-lost love. "I wanted to give the audience something to hold onto in terms of understanding that this was someone who was at one time—and still is, in certain respects—a thinking, feeling human being", Sarandon said. "This is a man who has been hunted for all his post-human existence, but who has fallen in love a number of times, and who in a sense, longs for a normal existence." Sarandon also did research into bats and discovered that most of the world's bat populations are frugivores, so he concluded, "Jerry had a lot of fruit bat in his DNA." This explains why his character is frequently munching on apples, which Sarandon decided his character was using to "cleanse his palate" after draining blood from his victims.

Stark and Sarandon had not picked up on Holland's intended gay subtext when they were developing their characters. "I didn't have any sense of it as being anything other than Renfield and Dracula", Chris Sarandon recalled. "I think there was sort of an asexual quality to the relationship that was sort of borderline homoerotic but not in the sense that it was creepy." For the scene in which Jerry pulls down the window shade and it looks as though Billy is about to perform oral sex on him, Stark remembered, "I'm cleaning his hand and [Tom Holland] said, 'No, get down on your knees.' 'Okay, Tom.' Then when I saw [the film], I thought, 'Oooooh, okay.'"

McDowall also did a lot of work on his character, and made a conscious decision to pattern his performance after the Cowardly Lion in The Wizard of Oz. "My part is that of an old ham actor, I mean a dreadful actor. He realizes it but doesn't admit it. He had a moderate success in an isolated film here and there, but all very bad product. This poor sonofabitch just played the same character all the time, which was awful. And then he disappeared from sight, 15 years beforehand. He's been peddling these movies to late night TV, various syndicated markets – he'd go six months in Iowa, six months in Podunk." McDowall commented to Fangoria, "He's got such a sad life, he's sort of cowardly and then he finds his strength as a human being." Despite the pathetic character he was portraying, McDowall was a pillar for the cast and crew. "He was a kind of Yoda on the set", commented Sarandon. Recalled Ragsdale, "He had his videocamera on his shoulder and he was shooting, like, family movies the whole time."

Sarandon recalled that Holland collaborated with choreographer Dorain Grusman in shooting a disco dance scene to have Bearse's character physically changing so that "she goes from this rather dewey, innocent-looking girl to this femme fatale; she kind of grows up right before your eyes." The scene also established Amy discovering Jerry actually was a vampire.

=== Filming ===
Principal photography commenced on December 3, 1984, and wrapped on February 23, 1985. At the time of production, Fright Night was Columbia's lowest-budgeted film and they did not have high expectations for it, so they were focusing all of their attention on the John Travolta/Jamie Lee Curtis film Perfect, which they were certain was going to be a blockbuster. "They never even came to the set", Holland said. "I was left alone. It was totally my film without studio interference."

A few mishaps did occur during filming, including an incident in which Ragsdale broke his ankle while running down a staircase. The schedule had to be reorganized, but filming continued. "Nobody panicked. In fact, I think that the thing I'll remember most about this movie is everyone's spirit and humor." The cast and crew seemed to meld with a singular vision of making the best movie possible. Early in production, Holland invited Fangoria writer Abbie Bernstein to visit the set as often as she liked, and she took him up on his offer. Of the wrap party in March, Bernstein wrote, "It's fun and pleasant, but it lacks the intense camaraderie of the set."

Filming took place at several locations around Los Angeles. The interiors were filmed at Laird International Studios with the now defunct Walt Disney "Residential Street" set at South Buena Vista Street, Burbank, used as the exteriors to both the Brewster and Dandrige Houses. The "Club Radio" nightclub sequence was shot at Young's Market Company Building, which had been also used as a nightclub in the 1984 film Body Double.

=== Make-up and visual effects ===
Richard Edlund was the head of visual effects, and his team had just completed work on Ghostbusters, which worked to the advantage of Fright Night. "They had made all of their mistakes with how to do the matte shots and everything on Ghostbusters, with their huge budget", Holland commented, "so they really knew how to do [the special effects] as inexpensively and efficiently as it could be done at the time."

The most excruciating part of the makeup process for the cast was the contact lenses. In those days, the lenses were hard plastic, which Steve Johnson hand-painted (throwing some glitter into the mix), lacquered, and sanded. The cast could only wear them for a maximum of 20 minutes because they were virtually blind in them, and they were thick and painful, and dried out their eyes. A set was made for Stark to wear when he was in his final pursuit of Peter and Charley, but he kept tripping on the stairs. Holland told him to take one out, and he was then able to perform the scene. Three sets were made for Amanda Bearse, but one of them caused her agonizing pain, which she initially tried to endure. When it finally became too much to bear, she took the contacts out and the crew realized they had forgotten to buff them. For the scene in Mrs. Brewster's bedroom, Geoffreys kept his contacts in for nearly 40 minutes, resulting in scratches on his eyeballs for months afterward.

For the transformation sequences, up to 8 hours were needed to prepare Sarandon's makeup. Sarandon was uncomfortable spending that long sitting in a chair doing nothing, and since he had experience doing his own makeup for his work on the stage, he volunteered to help. He did some of the stippling, and while the makeup men were applying prosthetics to his face and head, he worked on the finger extensions. Sarandon has often joked that the rubber fingers caused difficulties whenever he had to urinate, so costume supervisor Mort Schwartz constantly offered to help him. "I said to Morry, 'Thank you, no, I'll just use a coat hanger!'" Co-star Ragsdale recalled one instance when Sarandon spent an entire day in the makeup chair, and when he was finally fully transformed into the monster, a producer informed him that they were not going to be able to shoot the scene that day. "And Chris said, 'Okay,' and turned around and went and took it off, it was amazing!" Ragsdale exclaimed. "I would have gone through the roof, but he didn't. His will had been broken by that point!"

The makeup for Evil Ed's wolf transformation took 18 hours. While he had the wolf head on, the crew began pouring what they thought was methylcellulose into his mouth to create the illusion of saliva, but when Geoffreys began to complain about the taste, Mark Bryan Wilson realized they had been using prosthetic adhesive, which was gluing his mouth shut.

On Christmas Eve, during the shooting of a scene where he is running down a staircase, Ragsdale accidentally tripped and broke his ankle, resulting in the film being temporarily put on a hold until he could recover. "Rod Martin, a trainer for the Los Angeles Raiders, came in every day to wrap the foot for me, and the shooting schedule was rearranged to put off the action sequences until it mended." said Ragsdale. Many scenes were shot with his foot in a cast, including the scene in which Jerry comes to Charley's room to attack him. For shots in which Charley's feet were visible, the costumers slit Ragsdale's shoes in several places, slipped them on and then covered the portions of white cast that peeked through the slits with black cloth. For the scene in which Jerry is carrying Charley by the throat with one hand, Sarandon was simultaneously pushing Ragsdale along on a furniture dolly.

The shot of Jerry pulling the pencil out of his hand was achieved by having a spring-loaded, collapsible pencil glued to his palm and an eraser-tip loosely attached to the back of his hand. When he turns his hand and pulls the spring-loaded piece from his palm, out of shot a monofilament wire jerked away the tip, so when he turns it back, it appears as though he has pulled it straight through his hand. "So we go to the editing room", FX man Steve Johnson recalled of an early cut, "and Tom had put a reaction in the middle of it, ruined the entire shot!"

The crew attempted to achieve the illusion of the cross-scar vanishing from Evil Ed's forehead live on-set, but the effect was a resounding failure. In that predigital age, Edlund's crew was able to alter the film using optical photography to achieve the effect.

Filming of the sequence with the bat was difficult for effects veteran Randall Cook, who kept winding up on film while puppeteering the creature. Further complications ensued when the bat tries to bite Roddy McDowall's character and he forces a bone into its mouth; getting the puppet to bite was difficult, and then McDowall jerked the bone too hard and broke the bat's skull. The bat was quickly patched, but the required repairs forced them to wait two days to shoot more close-ups.

One of the props used in the film was an early or possibly the first example of a vampire killing kit.

== Soundtrack ==
Fright Night

Soundtrack album by Various artists
- Released: 1985
- Genres: Rock; new wave
- Length: 37:12
- Label: Private I

The original 10-track soundtrack album was released on LP and cassette in 1985 by Private-I Records. A promotional music video for the title song by J. Geils Band was made which used many clips from the film and received minor airplay on MTV. An instrumental version of Brad Fiedel's "Come to Me" was prominently featured throughout the movie, but the version on the album includes lyrics sung by Fiedel; instrumental versions were later issued on the CD with Fiedel's score (a different version which includes an additional verse was recorded by Deborah Holland for the end credits of Fright Night Part 2). The album was officially reissued in December 2016 on CD format by Perseverance Records.

=== Track listing ===
Side one
No.	Title	Writer(s)	Performed by	Length
1.	"Fright Night"	Joe Lamont	J. Geils Band	3:45
2.	"You Can't Hide from the Beast Inside"	Steve Plunkett	Autograph	4:14
3.	"Good Man in a Bad Time"	John Reede; Marc Tanner; Ron Aniello	Ian Hunter	3:41
4.	"Rock Myself to Sleep"	Kimberley Rew; Vince de la Cruz	April Wine	2:57
5.	"Let's Talk"	Mark Mothersbaugh	Devo	2:52

Side two
No.	Title	Writer(s)	Performed by	Length
1.	"Armies of the Night"	Ron Mael; Russell Mael	Sparks	4:34
2.	"Give It Up"	Bobby Caldwell; Dennis Matkosky	Evelyn "Champagne" King	3:43
3.	"Save Me Tonight"	Garri Brandon; Mitchell Leib	White Sister	4:22
4.	"Boppin' Tonight"	Gary Goetzman; Mike Piccirillo	Fabulous Fontaines	3:10
5.	"Come to Me"	Fiedel	Brad Fiedel	3:54
Total length:				37:12

Instrumental score

Fright Night

Soundtrack album by Brad Fiedel
- Released: 2011
- Recorded: 1984
- Length: 61:22 (original 2011 release); 63:50 (2025 expanded edition)
- Label: Intrada

A bootleg of Brad Fiedel's score for the film first surfaced in Japan in 2000. In 2011, Intrada Records officially issued the score on CD. Since some of the master tapes had gone missing, some of the music was transferred from lower-quality tapes. The limited-edition 2011 Twilight Time Blu-ray also included the complete isolated score.

In 2025, additional first generation masters were discovered and used to create a complete version of the film’s soundtrack for a 40th anniversary Intrada release.

=== Original 2011 release ===
All tracks are written by Brad Fiedel.

No.	Title	Length
1.	"Fright Night" (Medley from the 1/4" 15 i.p.s. Stereo Mixes)	15:25
2.	"Window Watching"	1:57
3.	"Jerry Takes Off"	1:45
4.	"Drive to Evil and Bat Attack"	2:07
5.	"Charlie's Cathedral, Charmed and Alley Bat"	5:29
6.	"Evil Visitor"	1:44
7.	"Charlie Begs for Help and Come to Me (Seduction Scene)"	9:44
8.	"Vampire Killers and Your Dinner's in the Oven"	9:44
9.	"Jerry's Time Is Up"	7:28
10.	"The Basement"	5:21
11.	"You're So Cool Brewster and Come to Me"	5:44
Total length:		61:22

== Release and reception ==
=== Box office ===
Fright Night's widest release was 1,545 theaters. The film made $6,118,543 on opening weekend (1,542 theaters, $3,967 average). The domestic gross came to $24,922,237. It performed the best of any horror film released during the summer of 1985 and was the second-highest grossing horror film of 1985, surpassed only by A Nightmare on Elm Street 2: Freddy's Revenge.

=== Critical reception ===
Fright Night garnered critical acclaim, holding an 83% approval rating on Rotten Tomatoes; the average rating is 7.2/10 based on 66 reviews. The site's consensus reads: "Fright Night deftly combines thrills and humor in this ghostly tale about a man living next to a vampire." Metacritic, which uses a weighted average, assigned the film a score of 62 out of 100 based on 13 reviews, indicating "generally favorable" reviews.

Roger Ebert of the Chicago Sun-Times gave the film three stars out of four and wrote, "Fright Night is not a distinguished movie, but it has a lot of fun being undistinguished". Variety praised Sarandon's performance, writing that he "is terrific as the vampire, quite affable and debonair until his fingernails start to grow and his eyes get that glow". Colin Greenland gave a negative review for White Dwarf #75, stating "We may be justified in suspecting that a film which has such contempt for its characters has contempt for its audience, too."

Edward Copeland revisited the film in a review, originally published on The House Next Door on June 13th, 2010. In his opinion, the film is the best 1980s example of the cinematic tale of the undead. He appreciates the blending of comedy, suspense, and horror that the director Tom Holland was able to create with the help of outstanding performances from the actors. He also acknowledges the quality of the film, saying it did not look cheap for what he assumes was a film made on a smaller budget.

=== Accolades ===
Award	Nominee	Subject	Result
Saturn Award	Best Director	Tom Holland	Nominated
Saturn Award	Best Writing	Tom Holland	Won
Saturn Award	Best Supporting Actor	Roddy McDowall	Won
Saturn Award	Best Horror Film		Won
Saturn Award	Best Actor	Chris Sarandon	Nominated

=== Home media ===
The original American VHS release by RCA/Columbia Pictures Home Video for video rental in 1986 featured a pan-and-scan version of the film and was packaged in a paper cover, which featured the poster artwork and sealed with a flap. This release was subsequently followed by a bargain copy that sported a photo of Evil Ed on the front cover.

The film was issued by Columbia/TriStar Home Video on DVD on September 7, 1999. This release included a double-sided DVD, which featured the widescreen version of the film on one side, a pan and scan version on the other, and the theatrical trailer on both. Included was a pamphlet with the poster art, five photos, scene selections, and a brief text interview with visual-effects art director John Bruno. The DVD was later issued by Sony Pictures Home Entertainment; this release is missing the pamphlet and bears a different company logo, but is otherwise identical to the previous DVD. In 2008, the film was paired on DVD with Urban Legend, and in 2013, it was issued again as part of the 4 Movie Thrills & Chills Collection, Volume 3 release alongside: The Craft, Monster High, and Brainscan.

On December 13, 2011, the film was released on Blu-ray by Twilight Time in an edition limited to 3,000 copies. This release includes two theatrical trailers, an isolated music score, and a four-page booklet containing an essay on the film as special features.

On January 20, 2015, Twilight Time re-released the film on Blu-ray as a 30th-Anniversary Edition, limited to 5,000 copies. The Blu-ray has gone out of print and has been a sought-after collector's item.

On February 12, 2019, Sony Pictures themselves re-released the film again on Blu-ray containing a new 4K remaster, which also included the remixed 5.1 audio and the original stereo mix. While it does exclude the isolated score, the booklet, and a few other special features, it also adds a few new special features not available on either of the Twilight Time releases.

On October 4, 2022, Sony Pictures released the film on Ultra HD 4K Blu-ray on Steelbook format for the first time. The disc includes the film in a Dolby Atmos audio track, the previous 5.1 track, the original stereo mix, Dolby Vision HDR, and over 13 hours of existing and new special features.

== Documentary film ==
Chris Griffiths directed, along with producer Gary Smart, the 2016 documentary film You're So Cool Brewster! The Story of Fright Night.

== Sequels and adaptations ==
After the critical and financial success of Fright Night, producer Herb Jaffe retained the screen rights to the characters and pushed for a sequel to be made. The resulting film, Fright Night Part 2, was released in December 1988.

Although he was unhappy that the budget was drastically slashed, Holland was interested, but Sarandon and he were both tied up making Child's Play, and could not commit to the film, though director Tommy Lee Wallace sought out Holland for advice and Sarandon visited the set while they were shooting. Stephen Geoffreys was approached to reprise the role of Evil Ed, but he did not like the script and he was offered the lead in 976-EVIL, which was scheduled to shoot at the same time, so he opted to take that part, instead. Bearse read an early draft of the script that included the Amy character, but she was busy with her TV series Married... with Children, so a new girlfriend (portrayed by Traci Lind) was written for Charley Brewster. In the end, only Ragsdale and McDowall reprised their roles, and a new set of villains was devised.

=== Remake ===
In May 2009, DreamWorks first announced that it would be overseeing a remake of Fright Night, which came to fruition and was released in 2011 with the same title: Fright Night. The script, penned by Buffy the Vampire Slayer alumna Marti Noxon, loosely followed the plot of the original film. Charley (Anton Yelchin) and his mother (Toni Collette) are transplanted from Corvalis, Iowa, to a Las Vegas suburb; Amy (Imogen Poots) is feistier and sexually aggressive; Evil Ed (Christopher Mintz-Plasse) has endured a falling out with Charley prior to the start of the film; Peter Vincent (David Tennant) is a horror magician modeled after Criss Angel; the Billy Cole character was omitted; and Jerry Dandrige (Colin Farrell) is no longer the lovelorn vampire. He was described by Evil Ed as "the fucking shark from Jaws" and has different intentions for his victims.

Sarandon was offered a role in the 2011 remake and chose to pass on the torch by doing a cameo as a man who is eaten by Jerry Dandrige. Sarandon pointed out "It's not the original and they didn't set out to make the original", but the cast and crew of the remake "were all huge fans." Farrell had watched the film countless times during his youth, and publicly stated "I heard they were remaking Fright Night and went 'Ah, god, remake! Hollywood, so dull!' And I read the script and really hoped I didn't like it, and I did." Recalled Sarandon of his first encounter with Farrell: "He walked in and he literally was almost shaking, he was so excited at the prospect of meeting his childhood idol. He gave me a beautiful bottle of wine and a DVD set of the Carl Dreyer Vampyr. It was a really graceful and wonderful introduction."

During a reunion panel discussion at Monsterpalooza in 2012, the cast of the original film discussed the remake at length. Bearse commented "as a stand-alone horror movie, it was very well done. It didn't lessen the appeal of the original. It was just more of a one-note film." Geoffreys only watched the first 20 minutes and then turned it off. Stark and Ragsdale went to a screening and discovered they "were the only two people" in attendance. Ragsdale liked an early draft of the screenplay, but he was not particularly enamored with the final result and was perplexed that "there was kind of a nastiness to" the Evil Ed character. The discussion dragged on for so long that the audience roared with laughter when Sarandon sarcastically interrupted Ragsdale to declare "I'm sure there are some other questions about the original Fright Night."

When asked his thoughts in 2015, creator Tom Holland replied "Kudos to them on every level for their professionalism, but they forgot the humor and the heart. They should have called it something other than Fright Night, because it had no more than a passing resemblance to the original. What they did to Jerry Dandrige and Peter Vincent was criminal." Smiling, he added "Outside of that, it was wonderful."

=== Potential direct sequel ===
From all accounts, McDowall relished playing Peter Vincent and was eager to bring Holland back to the franchise, so he had set up a meeting for Holland and himself with Carolco Pictures chairman José Menendez to discuss making Fright Night Part 3. However, before that meeting could occur, Menendez and his wife were murdered by their sons, Lyle and Erik. This stopped another sequel, and also interfered with the release of Fright Night Part 2, which attained extremely limited theatrical distribution before being dumped on home video by Carolco's subsidiary, Live Entertainment.

In January 2017, Tom Holland announced that he was writing a Fright Night 3 novel, noting that by 2019 he would obtain the rights to the franchise; after which he plans to develop a third movie.

In October 2020, Holland said that he was writing a direct-sequel to the original Fright Night, with the working title of Fright Night: Resurrection. He said "I'm bringing back everybody I can. I'm calling it Resurrection because we've got to resurrect Billy Cole and Jerry Dandridge." Holland went on to say "Part of the issue with the attempts at sequels and remakes is that the movie itself was kind of a singular idea, and a follow-up needed to be more than just set in the same world -- it needed to draw from the same set of inspirations and follow a similar thematic thread."

=== Prequel ===
In June 2025, Holland announced that author Michael Harbron—best known for his Interview with the Devil series, including The Witch and Vampyre—had signed on to write the official prequel to Fright Night. The project expanded the original 1985 film's mythology with new characters, deeper narrative layers, and a darker psychological tone. The novel, titled Fright Night: Hellbound, was released in October 2025 to coincide with the franchise's 40th anniversary. Harbron announced at the launch event (which was held at the Twisted Spine in New York), would expand the Fright Night Universe and shepherd in a whole new world of stories.

== In other media ==
=== Comic books ===
Between 1988 and 1993, NOW Comics published 27 Fright Night comic books. The original film was adapted as the first two issues of the series, Fright Night Part 2 was adapted as a stand-alone graphic novel (which was not canonical with the series), and the rest of the issues consisted of original stories following the further exploits of Peter Vincent and Charley Brewster, who teamed up to battle a vast array of vampires and monsters. Amy Peterson and Billy Cole only appeared in the first two issues, but Evil Ed returned to become a constant foil, and Jerry Dandrige was ultimately resurrected and had just begun to amass an army of Parisian vampire prostitutes when Now Comics filed for bankruptcy. Production halted in 1990 with issue #22, leaving the story incomplete. After corporate restructuring, four 3-D special issues were released between 1992 and 1993. Three of these releases were reprints of stories from the regular series while the fourth featured a previously unpublished story.

In 2018, Tom Holland announced a new comic series called Tom Holland's Fright Night: The Peter Vincent Chronicles, though the series did not materialize beyond its initial issue. It was followed in 2021 by a five-issue series titled Tom Holland's Fright Night that served as a follow-up to the original movie and which was authorized by Holland as a continuation of the story.

In 2025, a one-shot story called Tom Holland's Fright Night: Evil Ed Rising was published by American Mythology that focused on the fan-favorite character Evil Ed.

=== Novelizations ===
Tor Books published a novelization, Fright Night, by Craig Spector and John Skipp in 1985. Working from Holland's screenplay, Skipp and Spector only had a month to write the book, so it could be published to coincide with the release of the film. The book follows the story of the film, but includes additional details about the characters and their relationships. The novel has been out of print for decades, and resale prices wildly vary.

Fright Night: Origins, a new novelization of the film written by Tom Holland and Jack Ulrich, was released on September 8, 2022. The novel is the first book in a planned trilogy of books that will expand the Fright Night universe.

=== Video game ===
Fright Night, an arcade-style computer game was released by Microdeal in 1988 for Amiga computers. In the game, players assume the role of Jerry Dandrige as he attempts to turn his victims into vampires before sunrise.

=== Stage ===
The official stage adaptation of Fright Night celebrated its world premiere at Carnegie Stage in Pittsburgh, Pennsylvania, on October 5, 2018. It was written and directed by James Michael Shoberg and produced by the Rage of the Stage Players. The original cast included Dan Finkel as Charley Brewster, Elena Cristina Lázaro as Amy Petersen, Greg Crawford as Peter Vincent, Ryan Ott as Billy Cole, Brian Ceponis as Jerry Dandrige, Amanda Anne Leight as Judy Brewster, Corey Shaffer as "Evil" Ed Thompson, Dave Joseph as Lieutenant Detective Lennox, Ryan Frank as Donny, and Edward Bates as Leon.

=== Foreign market ===
In 1989, the film was unofficially remade in India as Kalpana House. Set at Christmastime, this version mirrors the original film, but the Peter Vincent character's occupation was changed to a priest, a few additional characters and scenes were added, and it includes several Bollywood-like musical numbers. The dialogue and credits are primarily in Malayalam, but all of the actors casually drift in and out of English.

== See also ==
- Vampire film
