= Vampire killing kit =

Box of items for killing vampires

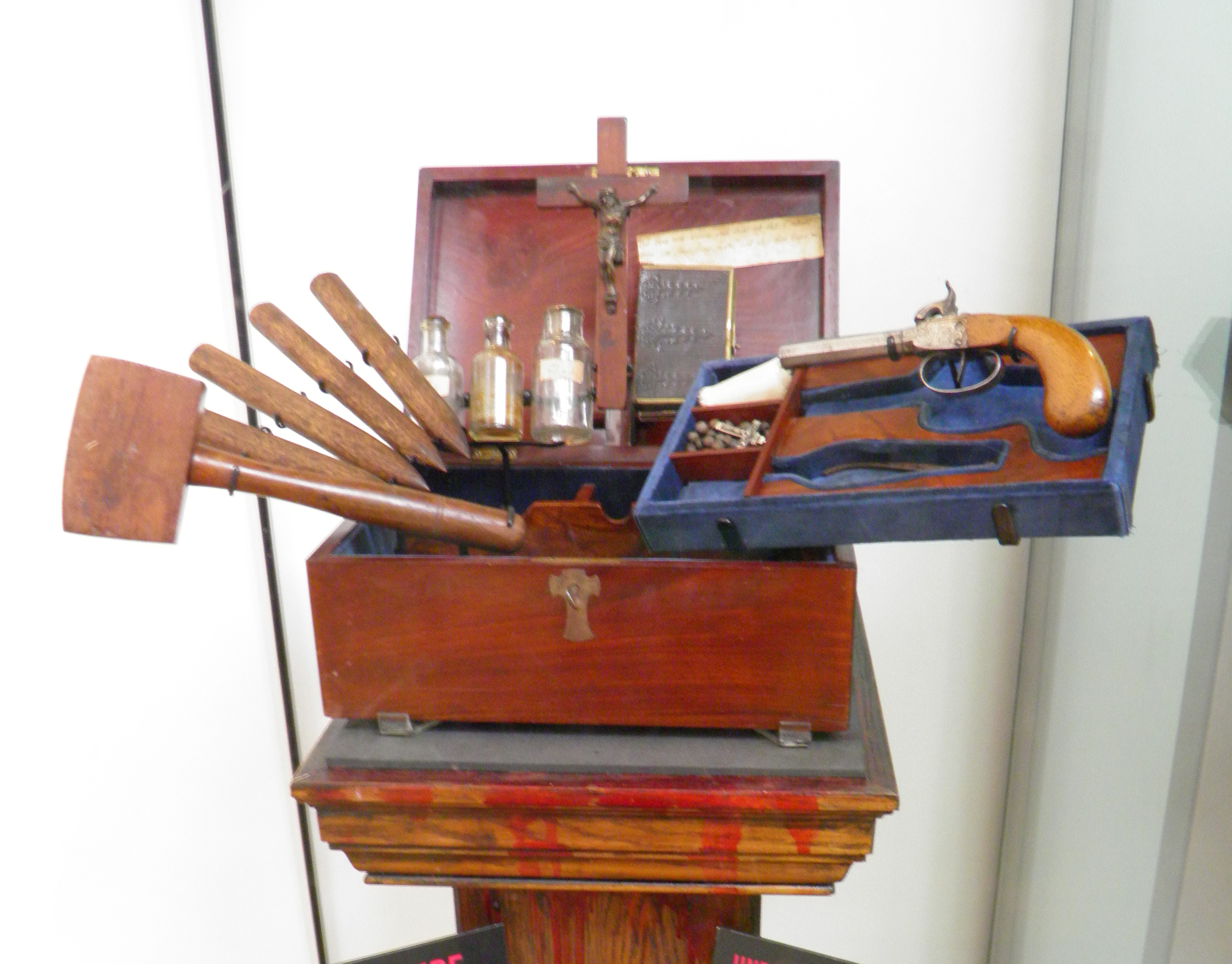
Vampire killing kit at the Royal Armouries

A vampire killing kit is a box containing various items commonly associated with killing vampires. While often presented as 19th-century items, they are believed to date to the second half of the 20th century at the earliest.

== Dating ==
The earliest known documentation of a kit is as a prop in the 1985 film Fright Night. A kit appeared for sale at auction in the United States the following year. These kits were compiled in response to a mid-20th-century craze for the Hammer horror movies.

A different kit was donated to the Mercer Museum in the 1980s. One kit was sold in 2022 that was attributed to Malcolm Hailey, 1st Baron Hailey, who died in 1969, with the auction house stating that they received it from one of his descendants; however, there is no period documentation supporting his ownership of this kit.

The presence of claimed silver bullets in a number of the kits makes them unlikely to be pre-20th century since silver bullets were not associated with vampire killing before that point. Jonathan Ferguson, Keeper of Firearms and Artillery at the Royal Armouries Museum, has argued that the contents of the kits are not consistent with the popular perception of vampire killing prior to the 1970s.

An example of a kit is held in the Victoria Police Museum in Melbourne, Australia. An academic at Monash University, Dr Patrick Spedding, believed it to be inspired by the 1990s movies Bram Stoker's Dracula and Sleepy Hollow.

== Contents ==
The items within vampire killing kits often date to the 19th century, although they may be combined with items such as paper labels that are significantly more recent.

The kit in the collection of the Royal Armouries contains a pocket pistol dating from around the middle of the 19th century; wooden stakes with a mallet; a crucifix; jars for holy water, soil, and garlic; a rosary; and an 1851 Book of Common Prayer. The case has been assessed as dating to around 1920, although the full kit was likely assembled around or after 1970.

The kit in the collection of the Mercer Museum was subject to analysis by X-ray fluorescence, which revealed the kit's silver bullets were made from pewter with no silver content. In addition to the pewter bullets, this kit contained a more conventional lead bullet, a gun, a bullet mold, a powder horn, an ivory cross, magnifying glass, a glass vial, and a glass syringe.

== Sales at auction ==
Kits have sold for prices in the thousands with one in 2010 selling at auction for £6,000 and another in 2012 for £7,500. The kit linked to Baron Hailey sold for £19,600. Many of the so-called vampire slaying kits that turn up at auction or even in museum collections are attributed to a “Professor Ernst Blomberg” and the gunmaker “Nicholas Plomdeur.” An article by Vamped discovered message board posts by a man who confessed to have invented both men to provide a convincing historical background for the vampire killing kits he began putting together in 1979.
