= Will Payne (actor) =

English actor

- Occupation: Actor
- Years active: 2008–present
- Relatives: Tom Payne (brother)

Will Payne is an English actor.

Will Payne grew up in Bath, Somerset, and is the younger brother of actor Tom Payne. He attended Kingswood School before going on to do a foundation year at the Royal Academy of Dramatic Art, graduating in 2009.

In 2012, he appeared in the feature film Elfie Hopkins, starring opposite Jaime Winstone and Ray Winstone. In the same year, he played George Harrison in the West End stage adaptation of Backbeat, directed by five time Tony Award nominee David Leveaux.

He was featured in Nylon Magazine's 2012 Young Hollywood Issue.

Payne played the role of Tony Travers in the ITV drama Mr Selfridge.

In 2015, Payne had a starring role (Johnny Valentine) in the world premiere of Teddy at the Southwark Playhouse.

== Filmography ==
Film

- Fright Night 2: New Blood (2013) Charley Brewster
- Mariah Mundi and the Midas Box (2013)
- Elfie Hopkins (2012) Elliot Gammon

Television

- Mr Selfridge (2013) Tony Travers
- Summer in Transylvania (2011) Rex

Theatre

- Backbeat (2012) George Harrison
