= Lock, stock, and barrel =

Lock, stock, and barrel is a figure of speech meaning "everything".

Lock, Stock, and Barrel may also refer to:

- Lock, Shock and Barrel (characters), three fictional characters in The Nightmare Before Christmas
- Lock, Stock and Barrel, a musical act appearing on the soundtrack of the film Cool Runnings
- Lock, Stock and Barrel (film), a 1971 television movie directed by Jerry Thorpe

== See also ==
- Lock, Stock and Two Smoking Barrels, a 1998 British crime comedy film
