= Mickey's Halloween Party =

Annual Halloween event at Disneyland and Disney California Adventure

Disneyland
- Status: Removed
- Opening date: 1995; 2010
- Closing date: 1996; 2018
- Replaced by: Oogie Boogie Bash – A Disney Halloween Party

Disney's California Adventure
- Status: Operating
- Opening date: 2005; 2019
- Closing date: 2009

Ride statistics
- Attraction type: Seasonal event
- Theme: Halloween, characters created by Disney
- Season: September–October
- Owner: Disney Parks
- Website: Official website

Mickey's Halloween Party (formerly known as "Mickey's Halloween Treat" from 2005 until 2007 and Mickey's Trick-or-Treat Party in 2008 and 2009) is an annual Halloween-themed separate admission at the Disneyland Resort in Anaheim, California. An earlier event with the original name had been held in 1995 and 1996 at the Disneyland Park, but was not revived until 2005 at Disney's California Adventure. Mickey's Halloween Party was considered to be a more family-friendly response to the scare-centered events Halloween Horror Nights, Knott's Scary Farm, and Six Flags Fright Fest. The event ran at Disney California Adventure through 2009, and returned to the Disneyland park as Mickey's Halloween Party starting in 2010. In 2019, the Party was moved back to Disney California Adventure and retitled Oogie Boogie Bash. Its new features included a water show at Pixar Pier called "Villainous".

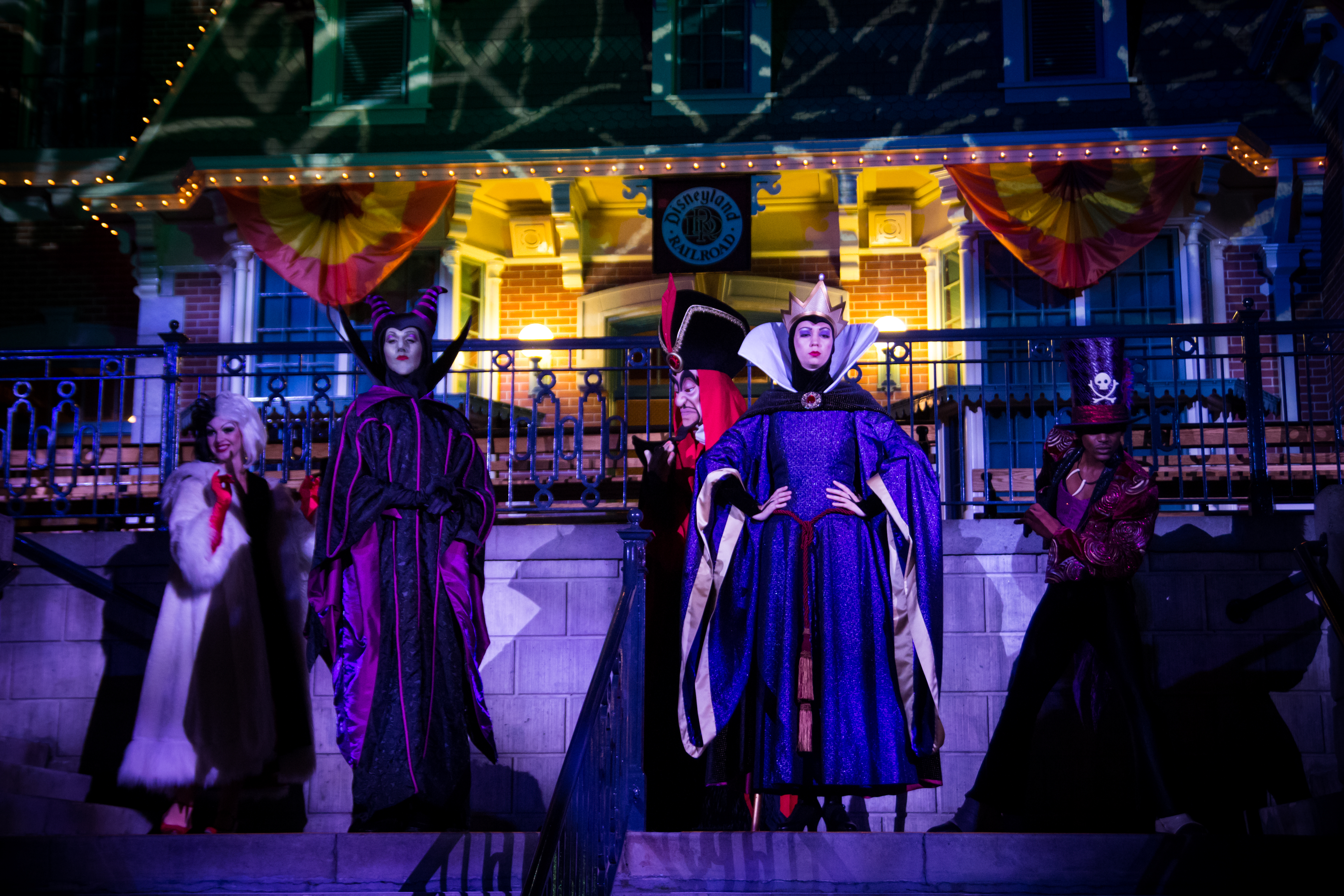
Disney villains at Disneyland's Mickey's Halloween Party 2012

Guests are encouraged to dress in costumes, including adults and those over the age of nine years who are normally prohibited from doing so. However, guests dressed as a Disney Character (like Mickey Mouse) are not allowed to have their pictures taken with other guests or sign autographs. Events include trick-or-treating; meet and greets with Disney Princesses, Mickey and Minnie in Halloween costumes and Disney villains; coloring activities for younger guests; and dance parties. For the activities starting in 2010, Disneyland's Halloween Time events - such as Haunted Mansion Holiday, Space Mountain's "Ghost Galaxy" layout and the Halloween themed fireworks show, called "Halloween Screams", featuring the voice of Chris Sarandon as Jack Skellington from The Nightmare Before Christmas - were added into the mix.

All Disney Parks closed temporarily in March 2020 in response to the COVID-19 pandemic. With theme parks closed through the end of 2020 in California caused by two stay-at-home orders issued by California Governor Gavin Newsom, Oogie Boogie Bash was cancelled for 2020.

== See also ==
- Mickey's Not-So-Scary Halloween Party
