= Glenn Shadix =

American actor and comedian (1952–2010)

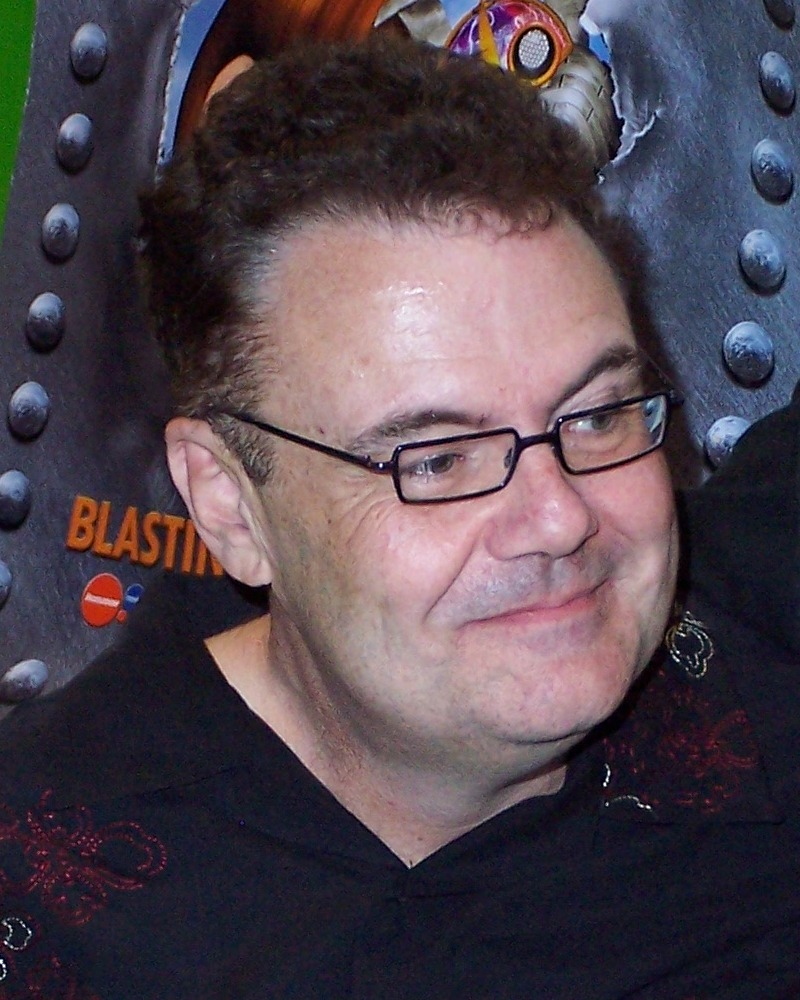
- Shadix in 2004
- Born: William Glenn Shadix; April 15, 1952; Bessemer, Alabama, U.S.
- Died: September 7, 2010 (aged 58); Birmingham, Alabama, U.S.
- Occupations: Actor; comedian
- Years active: 1979–2010
- Spouse: Jon Jung

William Glenn Shadix (April 15, 1952 – September 7, 2010) was an American actor and comedian. He was best known for his roles as Otho Fenlock in Tim Burton's Beetlejuice and the Mayor of Halloween Town in The Nightmare Before Christmas.

== Early life ==
Shadix was born on April 15, 1952, in Bessemer, Alabama, the eldest child in the family. His surname was legally changed to "Scott" when his mother, Annie Ruth (née Livingston), remarried a few years after his birth, although he would use his original surname when working as an actor. He attended Birmingham–Southern College for two years, studying with absurdist playwright-director Arnold Powell.

== Career ==
He lived in Manhattan, New York, prior to moving to Hollywood in 1977. He got his breakthrough film role in Beetlejuice as interior decorator Otho Fenlock, while appearing in The Groundlings comedy troupe and performing in the stage play Doctor Faustus Lights the Lights, portraying Gertrude Stein. Beetlejuice filmmaker Tim Burton went on to cast Shadix in two of his films: The Nightmare Before Christmas (1993) and Planet of the Apes (2001). Throughout the 1990s, Shadix had small roles in television series, including Cheers, Roseanne, The Fresh Prince of Bel-Air and Seinfeld.

In 1995, Shadix was cast as Ray Cathode in the Space Mountain queue advertisements when the ride was sponsored by FedEx.

In 2005, Shadix was cast as the voices of the Brain and Monsieur Mallah in the fifth season of the Teen Titans animated series. His other voice work includes the aforementioned Nightmare, and episodes of Jackie Chan Adventures and Justice League Unlimited (where he played Steven Mandragora). He reprised his Nightmare Before Christmas role in the video games The Nightmare Before Christmas: Oogie's Revenge and Square Enix's Kingdom Hearts II.

His television work included the HBO drama Carnivàle, the NBC television comedy Seinfeld, in which he played Jerry Seinfeld's landlord, and playing the roles of giant brothers Typhoon and Typhon in Hercules: The Legendary Journeys. On stage, Shadix was set to begin rehearsals for a Birmingham production of Alan Bennett's History Boys.

== Personal life ==
According to an interview with the Truth Wins Out website, Shadix came out as gay at the age of 17. His parents enrolled him in "ex-gay therapy", which included shock treatments. When this failed to change his orientation, Shadix attempted suicide by overdosing with Elavil. His parents rushed him to a hospital, where he survived a three-day coma. After the incident, his parents began to accept his sexuality.

Shadix was known to be a long-time fan of Joan Baez, dating back to his childhood, when he had to hide her records from his family who disapproved of the folk singer. Shadix travelled cross country to attend one of her concerts and meet her in person.

In 2007, after spending 30 years in Los Angeles, Shadix retired to his native Bessemer, Alabama, where he purchased a Queen Anne-style, Victorian-era home. The house was completely destroyed in a fire on December 13, 2008. Shadix told firefighters, "I have lost my dream." Despite this, he would continue to live in Alabama and was living in a condominium on Highland Avenue in Birmingham, Alabama at the time of his death in September 2010 at the age of 58.

Following Shadix’s death, his obituary identified his spouse Jon Jung.

== Death ==
In 2009, Shadix underwent surgery to provide relief to an ankle which he broke while filming. After recovering, he had mobility problems and used a wheelchair. On September 7, 2010, Shadix was found dead in his home. According to his sister, Susan Gagne, he fell and hit his head in the kitchen at his condominium in Birmingham, Alabama, and died of blunt trauma.

== Filmography ==
=== Film ===
Year	Title	Role	Notes
1979	Skatetown, U.S.A.		
1981	The Postman Always Rings Twice	Twin Oaks Customer	
1988	Beetlejuice	Otho Fenlock	
1988	Sunset	Roscoe Arbuckle	
1988	Heathers	Father Ripper	
1989	Parent Trap: Hawaiian Honeymoon	Chet	Television film
1990	Meet the Applegates	Greg Samson	
1991	Bingo	Duke	
1992	Sleepwalkers	Mr. Fallows	
1993	Demolition Man	Associate Bob	
1993	The Nightmare Before Christmas	Mayor of Halloween Town (voice)	
1994	Dark Side of Genius	Leon Bennini	
1994	My Summer Story	Leopold Doppler, Manager of Orpheum Theater	
1994	Love Affair	Anthony Rotundo	
1996	Dunston Checks In	Lionel Spalding	
1996	Multiplicity	Building Inspector	
1996	The Empty Mirror	Hermann Göring	
1997	Men	Neil	
1997	Sparkler	Announcer	
1998	Chairman of the Board	Larry	
1999	Storm	Nate	Direct-to-video
1999	Bartok the Magnificent	Townspeople (voice)	Direct-to-video
2000	Red Dirt	Virgil Cunningham	
2000	More Dogs Than Bones	Geoff	
2001	Fast Sofa	Apartment Manager	
2001	Planet of the Apes	Senator Nado	
2001	Shut Yer Dirty Little Mouth!	Peter	
2002	The Day the Dolls Struck Back	Narrator (voice)	Direct-to-video
2003	Sol Goode	Casting Director	
2003	Rose's	Sheriff Winslow	
2004	To Kill a Mockumentary	Karl	Direct-to-video
2007	The Final Curtain	Jack Strong	
2010	Finding Gauguin	Monsieur Vollard	Posthumous release

=== Television ===
Year	Title	Role	Notes	Ref
1987	The Golden Girls	Musician	Episode: "Diamond in the Rough"	
1990	Roseanne	Jay	Episode: "Chicken Hearts"	
1991	Seinfeld	Harold	Episode: "The Apartment"	
1992	Night Court	Dermot Drake	Episode: "The 1992 Boat Show"	
1992	Cheers	Bernard	Episode: "The Beer Is Always Greener"	
1993	The Fresh Prince of Bel-Air	Ralph Scorpius	Episode: "Hex and the Single Guy"	
1994	Dinosaurs	Ray, Monster (voice)	2 episodes	
1994	Aaahh!!! Real Monsters	Guard Monster (voice)	Episode: "Snorched If You Do, Snorched If You Don't"	
1994–95	Tattooed Teenage Alien Fighters from Beverly Hills	Nimbar (voice)	40 episodes	
1995–96	The Mask: Animated Series	Lonnie the Shark (voice)	4 episodes	
1995	Bobby's World	Additional voices	Episode: "Bobby the Genius"	
1995	Life with Louie	Additional voices	Episode: "Lake Winnibigoshish"	
1995–97	Hercules: The Legendary Journeys	Typhon, Typhoon	3 episodes	
1996	Quack Pack	Professor Tobar, Dr. Emile	Voice, 2 episodes	
1996–98	The Fantastic Voyages of Sinbad the Sailor	Additional voices	26 episodes	
1997	What a Cartoon!	Doctor (voice)	Episode: "Snoot's New Squat"	
1997	Duckman	Army Leader Guest (voice)	Episode: "Duckman and Cornfed in 'Haunted Society Plumbers'"	
1997	Extreme Ghostbusters	Mirror Demon (voice)	Episode: "The Ghostmakers"	
1997	Cow and Chicken	Prisoner No. 1, Poopy the Clown, Gate Guard (voice)	Episode: "Field Trip to Folsom Prison"	
1997–98	The New Adventures of Zorro	Additional voices	26 Episodes	
1998	Jumanji	Mr. Shattuck (voice)	Episode: "Return of Squint"	
1999	Thanks	Doctor Addington	6 episodes	
1999	Sabrina, the Teenage Witch	Caligula	Episode: "Salem, the Boy"	
1999	Rocket Power	Mayor (voice)	Episode: "D is for Dad/Banned on the Run"	
2000	Men in Black: The Series	Additional voices	Episode: "The Spectacle Syndrome"	
2000–01	Stainboy	Sgt. Glen Dale, Charity Home Matron, TV Announcer (voice)	6 episodes	
2001–02	Jackie Chan Adventures	Tso Lan, Xiao Fung (voice)	5 episodes	
2001	ER	Eldon	Episode: "Blood, Sugar, Sex, Magic"	
2002	Time Squad	Man, King of Troy (voice)	Episode: "Never Look A Trojan in the Gift Horse"	
2003	Lilo & Stitch: The Series	"Look at This" Producer (voice)	Episode: "Swirly"	
2003–05	Carnivàle	Val Templeton	5 episodes	
2004–05	All Grown Up!	Santa, The Tree, Karl Bender (voice)	2 episodes	
2004	The Batman	Arthur Brown / Cluemaster (voice)	Episode: "Q&A"	
2005	Xiaolin Showdown	Giant Spider (voice)	Episode: "Dangerous Minds"	
2005	Justice League Unlimited	Steven Mandragora (voice)	Episode: "Double Date"	
2005–06	Teen Titans	Brain, Monsieur Mallah (voice)	6 episodes	

=== Video games ===
Year	Title	Role	Notes
1994	Demolition Man	Associate Bob	Archival footage from Demolition Man
2004	The Nightmare Before Christmas: Oogie's Revenge	Mayor of Halloween Town	
2005	Kingdom Hearts II	Mayor of Halloween Town	
2007	Kingdom Hearts II: Final Mix+	Mayor of Halloween Town	Archival audio
2014	Kingdom Hearts HD 2.5 Remix	Mayor of Halloween Town	Archival audio
2017	Kingdom Hearts HD 1.5 + 2.5 Remix	Mayor of Halloween Town	Archival audio
