= The Nightmare Before Christmas =

1993 film by Henry Selick

- Theatrical release poster
- Directed by: Henry Selick
- Screenplay by: Caroline Thompson
- Adaptation by: Michael McDowell
- Story by: Tim Burton
- Based on: "The Nightmare Before Christmas" by Tim Burton
- Produced by: Denise Di Novi; Tim Burton
- Starring: Danny Elfman; Chris Sarandon; Catherine O'Hara; William Hickey; Glenn Shadix; Paul Reubens; Ken Page; Ed Ivory
- Cinematography: Pete Kozachik
- Edited by: Stan Webb
- Music by: Danny Elfman
- Production companies: Touchstone Pictures (Note: The Nightmare Before Christmas was reissued through the Walt Disney Pictures banner in 2006 and in subsequent theatrical and home media re-releases since then.); Walt Disney Pictures; Skellington Productions; Pixar Animation Studios
- Distributed by: Buena Vista Pictures Distribution
- Release dates: October 9, 1993 (New York Film Festival); October 29, 1993 (United States)
- Running time: 76 minutes
- Country: United States
- Language: English
- Budget: $18 million
- Box office: $111 million

The Nightmare Before Christmas (also known as Tim Burton's The Nightmare Before Christmas) is a 1993 American musical fantasy film directed by Henry Selick and written by Caroline Thompson, based on a story by producer Tim Burton. The stop-motion animated work tells the tale of Jack Skellington, the leader of Halloween Town, who stumbles upon Christmas Town and becomes obsessed with celebrating and taking over the holiday himself, only to cause disaster through his failure to understand or respect it. Danny Elfman composed the score and songs and provided Jack's singing voice, while the principal voice cast includes Chris Sarandon, Ken Page, Catherine O'Hara, Glenn Shadix, William Hickey, Paul Reubens and Ed Ivory.

The Nightmare Before Christmas originated from a poem written by Tim Burton in 1982 while he was working as an animator at Walt Disney Feature Animation. With the critical success of Vincent that same year, Burton began to consider developing the story as either a short film or a half-hour television special, to no avail. Over the years, Burton's thoughts regularly returned to the project, and in 1990 he made a development deal with the Walt Disney Studios. Production, under Burton and Denise Di Novi, started in July 1991. Disney originally released the film under the Touchstone Pictures banner, believing the film's Gothic tone would be "too dark and scary for kids".

The Nightmare Before Christmas premiered at the New York Film Festival on October 9, 1993, and was given a limited release on October 13, before a wide theatrical release on October 29 by Buena Vista Pictures Distribution. The film was met with critical and commercial success upon release, and has since garnered a cult following. It was nominated for the Academy Award for Best Visual Effects, a first for an animated film. Thirteen years after its initial release, the film was reissued by Walt Disney Pictures and was re-released annually from 2006 until 2010.

In 2023, the film was selected for preservation in the United States National Film Registry by the Library of Congress as being "culturally, historically or aesthetically significant."

== Plot ==
Halloween Town is a fantasy world inhabited by monsters and supernatural beings associated with the holiday. Jack Skellington, the town's patron spirit and respected "Pumpkin King," leads its annual celebrations alongside the Mayor. Bored with the routine and longing to try something new, Jack wanders through the nearby forest, discovers a circle of doors representing different holidays and opens the one leading to Christmas Town. The unfamiliar holiday and its traditions fascinate him, and he explores the town before returning home.

Jack shares his discovery with his friends, his neighbors and the Mayor, but they struggle to grasp the concept of Christmas. Although they find its customs confusing, they relate to its ruler, Santa Claus, whom Jack mistakenly calls "Sandy Claws." After several futile attempts to explain Christmas rationally, Jack decides to "improve" the holiday by adapting it to Halloween Town's style. He announces that the town will take over Christmas that year. With the Mayor's enthusiastic help, Jack coordinates the townspeople and assigns them various Christmas-themed tasks, such as singing carols, making presents and building a coffin sleigh pulled by skeletal reindeer.

Sally, the feminine creation of the local mad scientist Doctor Finkelstein, has a vision predicting that Jack's plans will end disastrously. Secretly in love with Jack, she attempts to warn him, but he dismisses her concerns and instructs her to make a Santa suit for him. Meanwhile, Jack tasks the mischievous trick-or-treating trio Lock, Shock and Barrel with abducting Santa. He specifically orders them not to involve his longtime rival, Oogie Boogie, a bogeyman with a passion for gambling.

When Lock, Shock and Barrel bring Santa to Halloween Town, Jack explains that he intends to take over Christmas for the year and orders the trio to keep Santa safe until his return. However, they disobey his instructions and deliver Santa to Oogie Boogie, who plans to involve him in a dangerous game with his life at stake. Meanwhile, Jack departs for the real world in his sleigh to deliver the Halloween-themed presents that he and the townspeople have prepared. Having failed to stop Jack from proceeding with his plan, Sally attempts to rescue Santa from Oogie, only to be captured herself.

Jack's presents, intended to bring joy to the real world's populace, terrify them instead. Frightened people contact the local authorities, who advise them to lock down their homes for protection. The military is alerted and shoots Jack's sleigh out of the sky with an anti-aircraft gun. Believing that Jack has been destroyed, the Mayor returns to Halloween Town to announce his death to the townspeople. However, Jack has survived and crashed into a nearby cemetery. Reflecting on the chaos that he has caused, he acknowledges his failure to understand or respect Christmas, but develops fresh enthusiasm for his own holiday as new ideas for celebrating Halloween arise from the experience.

Returning to Halloween Town, Jack rescues Santa and Sally from Oogie Boogie. He then defeats Oogie by unraveling a thread holding his cloth form together, causing the bugs inside him to spill out and reduce him to nothing. Although Santa is displeased with Jack for his reckless actions and for ignoring Sally's warnings, he ultimately makes amends with him. Santa resumes his duties, replacing Jack's frightening presents with genuine gifts and ensuring that Christmas is saved.

Halloween Town's inhabitants, led by the Mayor, celebrate Jack's return, relieved that their leader has survived. Santa brings a snowfall to the town, introducing its residents to the Christmas spirit. As the snow falls, Jack and Sally finally declare their love for each other.

== Voice cast ==
- Danny Elfman (singing) and Chris Sarandon (speaking) as Jack Skellington, the skeleton patron spirit and "Pumpkin King" of Halloween Town. Elfman was initially cast as the character's singing voice, and after the songs were recorded, Sarandon was cast to provide his speaking voice. Jack does more singing than talking.
  - Elfman additionally voices:
    - Barrel, one of the trick-or-treaters working for Oogie Boogie, who wears a skeleton costume.
    - The Clown with the Tear-Away Face, an inhabitant of Halloween Town who appears as a unicycle-riding evil clown who can a remove his face, revealing a dark void underneath.
- Catherine O'Hara as Sally, a good-natured rag doll-like creation of Doctor Finkelstein and Jack's love interest. She is a toxicologist who uses various types of poison to free herself from her creator's captivity. She is psychic and has premonitions when something bad is about to happen. O'Hara had previously co-starred in Burton's Beetlejuice.
  - O'Hara additionally voices Shock, one of the trick-or-treaters working for Oogie Boogie, who wears a witch costume.
- William Hickey as Doctor Finkelstein, a mad scientist and the loving yet overbearing creator of Sally. He is listed in the credits only as "Evil Scientist" and is mentioned by name only twice in the film.
- Glenn Shadix as the Mayor of Halloween Town, an enthusiastic leader who conducts town meetings. His double-sided head spins between a "happy" and a "sad" face, mirroring his wild mood swings; whereas some career politicians are described as figuratively two-faced, the mayor is literally so. Shadix and Burton had previously worked together on Beetlejuice.
- Paul Reubens as Lock, one of the trick-or-treaters working for Oogie Boogie, who wears a devil costume. Reubens and Burton had previously worked together on Pee-wee's Big Adventure and Batman Returns.
- Ken Page as Oogie Boogie, a villainous bogeyman in Halloween Town who has a passion for gambling and is Jack's rival. Unlike the rest of the town's inhabitants, who scare others for fun and are opposed to causing harm, Oogie is ruthless, bitter, and a bully who resents being treated as a local outcast.
- Ed Ivory as Santa Claus, the ruler of Christmas Town. Santa is responsible for the annual celebration of Christmas, during which he delivers presents to children in the real world. He is also referred to by Halloween Town's inhabitants as "Sandy Claws" and provides the brief narration at the beginning of the film. Patrick Stewart recorded Santa Claus's narration for the extended prologue and epilogue. Although it was not used in the final film, the narration is included on the soundtrack album.
- Susan McBride as:
  - Big Witch, a tall witch and Small Witch's best friend.
  - Withered Winged Demon, a small demon who walks on its large wings.
- Debi Durst as:
  - Corpse Kid, a young zombie.
  - Corpse Mom, Corpse Kid's mother.
  - Small Witch, a short witch with a mushroom on her nose and Big Witch's best friend.
- Greg Proops as:
  - The Devil, a horned demon.
  - Harlequin Demon, a demon with a large mouth filled with sharp teeth and three movable fronds.
  - Sax Player, a saxophone-playing zombie in a Halloween Town music trio.
- Kerry Katz as:
  - Accordion Player, an accordion-playing zombie in a Halloween Town music trio.
  - Corpse Dad, Corpse Kid's father.
  - The One Hiding Under the Stairs, a Halloween Town inhabitant with a worm-like head, spider-like hair, snakes in place of fingers, and a wheeled platform for legs.
  - Vampire Baron, a member of the Vampire Brothers.
- Randy Crenshaw as:
  - Behemoth, a towering zombie with an axe in his head.
  - Mr. Hyde, a Halloween Town inhabitant with smaller versions of himself beneath his top hat.
  - Vampire Count, a member of the Vampire Brothers.
- Sherwood Ball as:
  - Mummy, a young mummy.
  - Vampire Prince, a member of the Vampire Brothers.
- Carmen Twillie as:
  - Monster Under the Bed, a Halloween Town inhabitant who appears only during the song "This Is Halloween".
  - Undersea Gal, a gill-man/mermaid hybrid.
- Glenn Walters as Wolfman, a werewolf.
- Joe Ranft as Igor (uncredited), Dr. Finkelstein's hunchbacked lab assistant.

== Production ==
=== Development ===
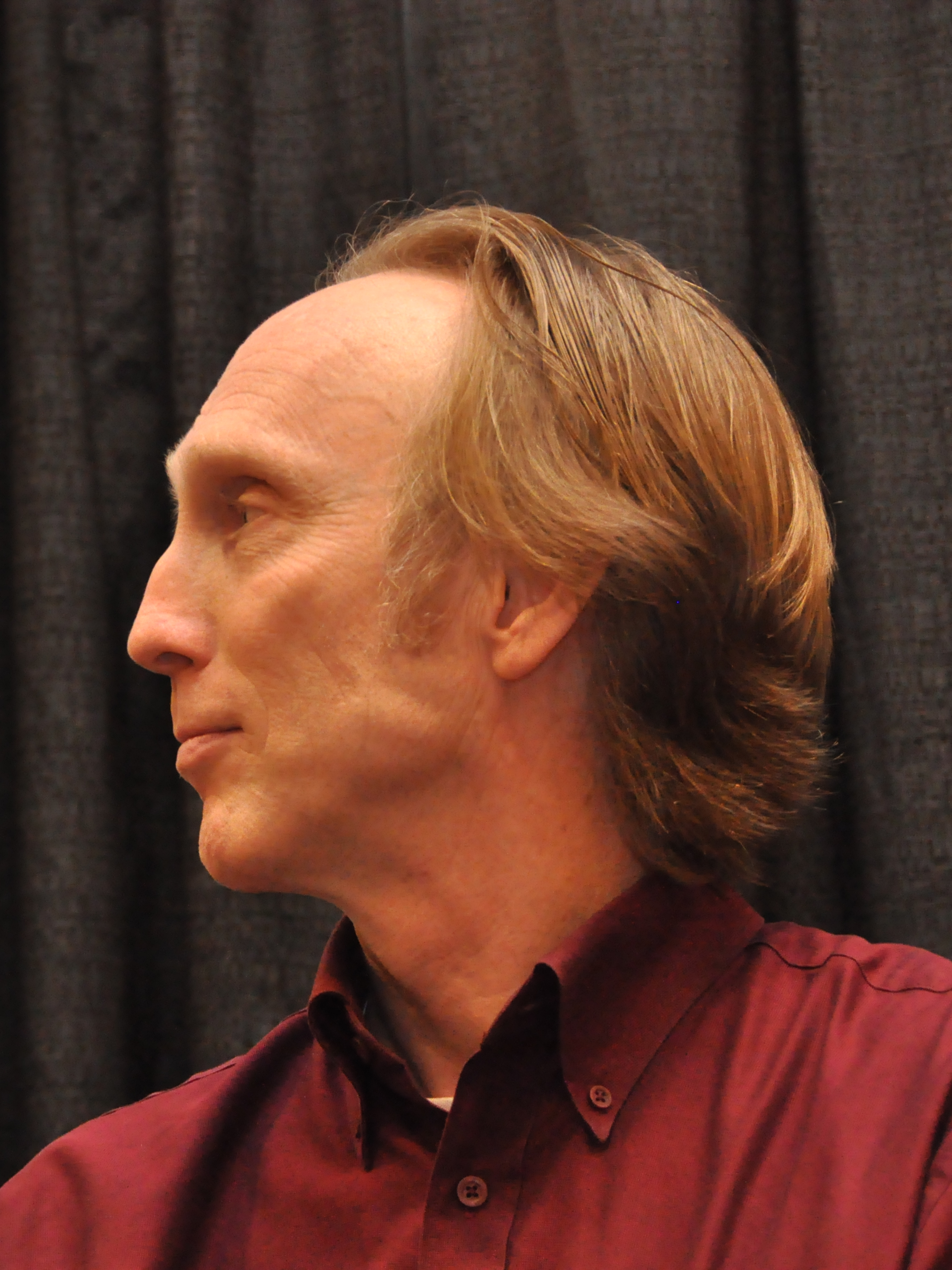
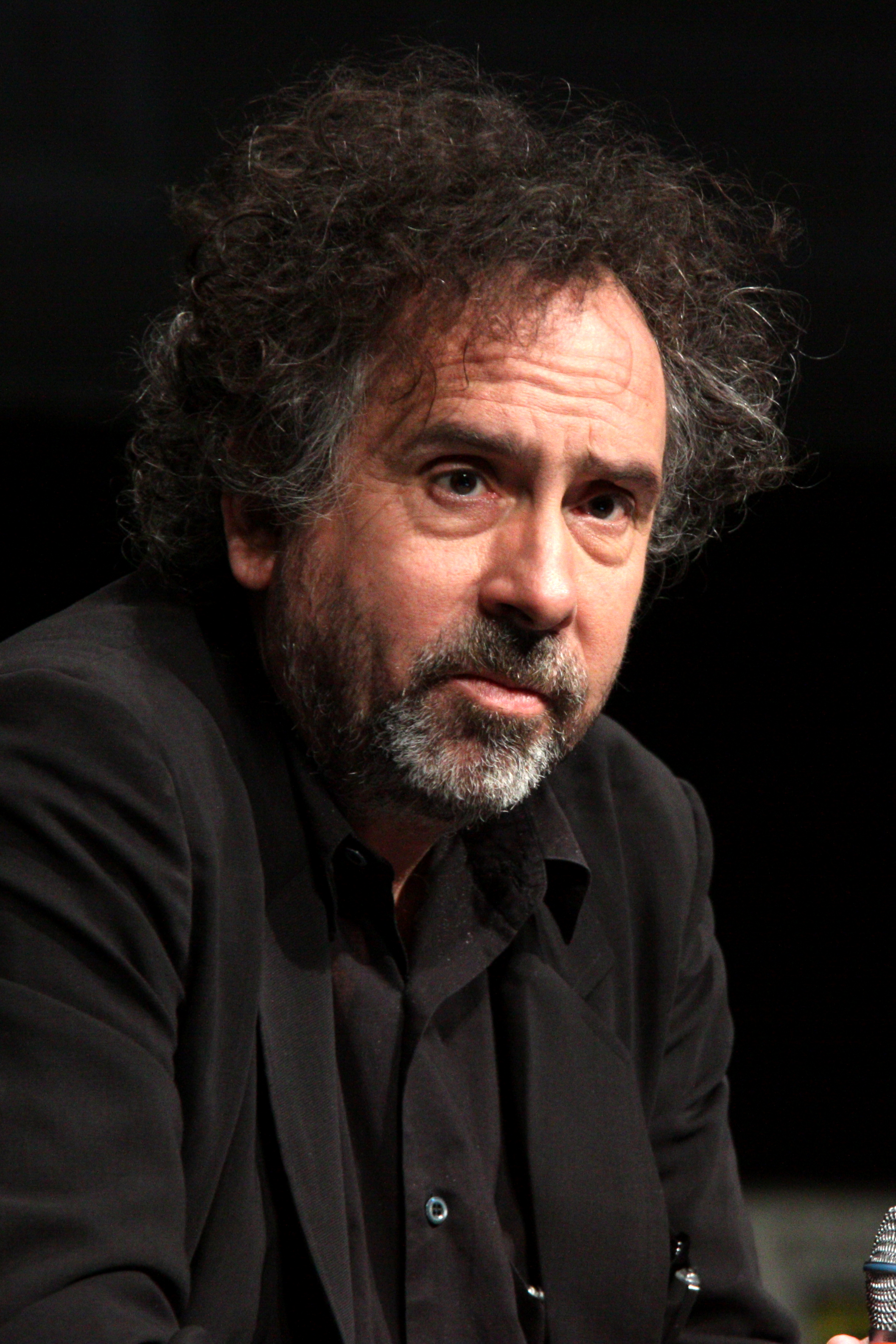
Director Henry Selick and producer/creator Tim Burton

As writer Tim Burton's upbringing in Burbank, California, was associated with the feeling of solitude, the filmmaker was largely fascinated by holidays during his childhood. "Anytime there was Christmas or Halloween, [...] it was great. It gave you some sort of texture all of a sudden that wasn't there before," Burton would later recall. After completing his short film Vincent in 1982, Burton, who was then employed at Walt Disney Feature Animation, wrote a three-page poem titled The Nightmare Before Christmas, drawing inspiration from television specials of Rudolph the Red-Nosed Reindeer, How the Grinch Stole Christmas! and the poem A Visit from St. Nicholas. Burton intended to adapt the poem into a television special with the narration spoken by his favorite actor, Vincent Price, but also considered other options such as a children's book. He created concept art and storyboards for the project in collaboration with Rick Heinrichs, who also sculpted character models; Burton later showed his and Heinrichs' works-in-progress to Henry Selick, also a Disney animator at the time. After the success of Vincent in 1982, Disney started to consider developing The Nightmare Before Christmas as either a short film or 30-minute holiday television special. However, the project's development eventually stalled, as its tone seemed "too weird" to the company. As Disney was unable to "offer his nocturnal loners enough scope", Burton was fired from the studio in 1984 and went on to direct the commercially successful films Beetlejuice (1988) and Batman (1989) for Warner Bros. Pictures.

Over the years, Burton regularly thought about the project. In 1990, Burton found out that Disney still owned the film rights. He and Selick committed to produce a full-length film expanding on the poem's storyline with the latter as director. Selick chose not to work with MTV for a series based on his short film Slow Bob in the Lower Dimensions to direct this film. Burton's own success with live-action films piqued the interest of Walt Disney Studios chairman Jeffrey Katzenberg, who saw the film as an opportunity to continue the studio's streak of recent successes in feature animation. Disney was looking forward to Nightmare "to show capabilities of technical and storytelling achievements that were present in Who Framed Roger Rabbit." Walt Disney Pictures president David Hoberman believed the film would prove to be a creative achievement for Disney's image, elaborating "we can think outside the envelope. We can do different and unusual things." Nightmare marked Burton's third consecutive film with a Christmas setting. Burton could not direct because of his commitment to Batman Returns (and was also in pre-production on Ed Wood), and he did not want to be involved with "the painstakingly slow process of stop motion". To adapt his poem into a screenplay, Burton approached Michael McDowell, his collaborator on Beetlejuice. McDowell and Burton experienced creative differences, which convinced Burton to make the film as a musical with lyrics and compositions by frequent collaborator Danny Elfman. Elfman and Burton created a rough storyline and two-thirds of the film's songs. Elfman found writing Nightmare's eleven songs to be "one of the easiest jobs I've ever had. I had a lot in common with Jack Skellington." Caroline Thompson had yet to be hired to write the screenplay. With Thompson's screenplay, Selick stated, "there are very few lines of dialogue that are Caroline's. She became busy on other films and we were constantly rewriting, re-configuring and developing the film visually." Thompson clashed with Burton and he also destroyed the editing machine after she said she wanted to redraft the film's ending.

=== Filming ===
Selick and his team of animators began production in July 1991 in San Francisco, California, with a crew of over 120 workers, utilizing 20 sound stages for filming. Joe Ranft was hired from Disney as a storyboard supervisor, while Eric Leighton was hired to supervise animation. In total, there were 109,440 frames shot for the film. The work of Ray Harryhausen, Ladislas Starevich, Edward Gorey, Étienne Delessert, Gahan Wilson, Charles Addams, Jan Lenica, Francis Bacon, and Wassily Kandinsky influenced the filmmakers. Selick compared the look of Halloween Town to German Expressionist aesthetics and said that Christmas Town was influenced by the work of Dr. Seuss. Vincent Price, Don Ameche, and James Earl Jones were considered as potential narrators for the film's prologue; however, all three proved difficult to cast, and the producers instead hired Ed Ivory. Patrick Stewart provided the prologue narration for the film's soundtrack. On the direction of the film, Selick reflected, "It's as though [Burton] laid the egg, and I sat on it and hatched it. He wasn't involved in a hands-on way, but his hand is in it. It was my job to make it look like 'a Tim Burton film', which is not so different from my own films." When asked about Burton's involvement, Selick claimed, "I don't want to take away from Tim, but he was not in San Francisco when we made it. He came up five times over two years, and spent no more than eight or ten days in total." Walt Disney Feature Animation provided digital effects and some second-layering traditional animation.

Burton found production somewhat difficult, because he was simultaneously filming Batman Returns and in pre-production for Ed Wood. The filmmakers constructed 227 puppets to represent the characters in the movie, with Jack Skellington having "around four hundred heads", allowing the expression of every possible emotion. Sally's mouth movements "were animated through the replacement method. During the animation process, [...] only Sally's face 'mask' was removed in order to preserve the order of her long, red hair. Sally had ten types of faces, each made with a series of eleven expressions (e.g. eyes open and closed, and various facial poses) and synchronized mouth movements." The stop-motion figurine of Jack was reused in James and the Giant Peach (also directed by Selick) as Captain Jack.

== Soundtracks ==
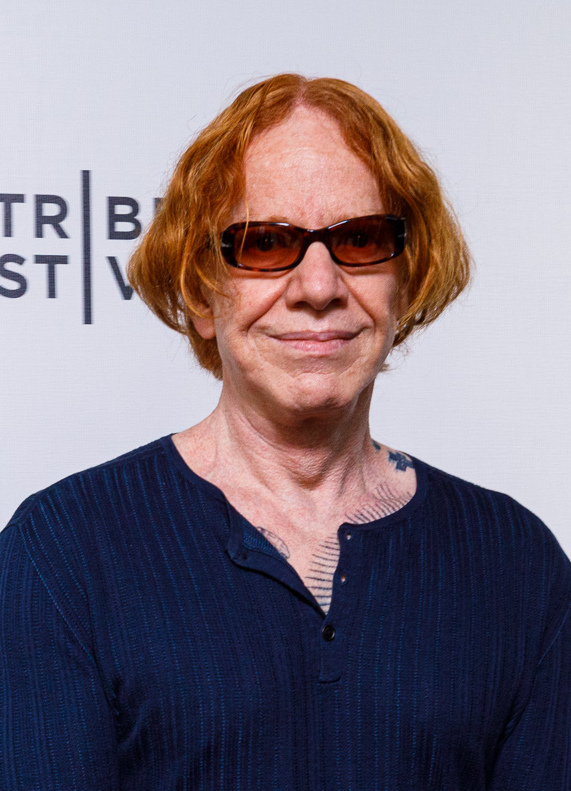
Composer Danny Elfman

The film's soundtrack album was released in 1993 on Walt Disney Records. The film's soundtrack contains bonus tracks, including a longer prologue and an extra epilogue, both narrated by Patrick Stewart. For the film's 2006 re-release in Disney Digital 3-D, a special edition of the soundtrack was released, featuring a bonus disc that contained covers of five of the film's songs by Fall Out Boy, Panic! at the Disco, Marilyn Manson, Fiona Apple, and She Wants Revenge. Four original demo tracks by Elfman were also included. On September 30, 2008, Disney released the cover album Nightmare Revisited, featuring artists such as Amy Lee, Flyleaf, Korn, Rise Against, Plain White T's, The All-American Rejects, and many more. American gothic rock band London After Midnight featured a cover of "Sally's Song" on their 1998 album Oddities. Pentatonix released a cover of "Making Christmas" for their 2018 Christmas album Christmas Is Here!. In 2003, the Disneyland Haunted Mansion Holiday soundtrack CD was released. Although most of the album's songs are not original ones from the film, one song is a medley of "Making Christmas", "What's This?", and "Kidnap the Sandy Claws". Other songs included are original holiday songs changed to incorporate the theme of the film. However, the last song is the soundtrack for the Disneyland Haunted Mansion Holiday ride.

== Release ==
The Nightmare Before Christmas was originally going to be released under Walt Disney Pictures as part of the Walt Disney Feature Animation lineup, but Disney decided to release the film under the studio's adult-oriented Touchstone Pictures banner, because the studio thought the film would be "too dark and scary for kids," Selick remembered. "Their biggest fear, and why it was kind of a stepchild project, [was] they were afraid of their core audience hating the film and not coming." To convey Burton's involvement and attract a wider audience, Disney marketed the film as Tim Burton's The Nightmare Before Christmas. According to Selick, the decision was made approximately three weeks before the film went into wide release. Burton explained that, "...it turned more into more of a brand-name thing, it turned into something else, which I'm not quite sure about." The film made its world premiere on the opening day celebration of the New York Film Festival on October 9, 1993, and was given a limited release on October 13, 1993, before its wide theatrical release on October 29, 1993.

The Nightmare Before Christmas was reissued under the Walt Disney Pictures label and re-released on October 20, 2006, with conversion to Disney Digital 3-D, and was accompanied by Pixar's short film Knick Knack. Industrial Light & Magic assisted in the process. It subsequently re-released on October 19, 2007, October 24, 2008, and October 23, 2009. The El Capitan Theatre in Hollywood, California, has been showing the film in 4D screenings annually in October, ending on Halloween, since 2010. The reissues have led to a reemergence of 3D films and advances in RealD Cinema. In October 2020, The Nightmare Before Christmas was re-released in 2,194 theaters. It grossed $1.3 million over the weekend, finishing fourth behind Tenet. For the film's 30th anniversary and in commemoration of The Walt Disney Company's centennial, it was re-released in theaters across the United States and Canada on October 20, 2023, including engagements in 4DX. The film was once again theatrically re-released on October 11, 2024.

=== Home media ===
With years of successful home video sales, The Nightmare Before Christmas later achieved the ranks of a cult film. Touchstone Home Video first released the film on VHS and LaserDisc (in both deluxe CAV and widescreen editions) on September 30, 1994, and on DVD on December 2, 1997. The Nightmare Before Christmas was released on DVD a second time on October 3, 2000, as a special edition. The release included an audio commentary by Selick and cinematographer Pete Kozachik, a 28-minute making-of documentary, a gallery of concept art, storyboards, test footage and deleted scenes. Burton's Vincent (1982) and Frankenweenie (1984) were also included. Both DVDs were non-anamorphic widescreen releases. The film was released on UMD for PlayStation Portable on October 25, 2005. Walt Disney Studios Home Entertainment reissued the DVD (this time with an anamorphic transfer) and on Blu-ray Disc (for the first time) on August 26, 2008, as a two-disc digitally remastered "collector's edition", but still containing the same special features. Walt Disney Studios Home Entertainment released The Nightmare Before Christmas on Blu-ray 3D on August 30, 2011. The release included a Blu-ray 3D disc, a Blu-ray disc, and a DVD that includes both a DVD and digital copy. In 2018, a sing-along version, accompanied by the theatrical cut and a Movies Anywhere copy, as a single-disc version for the film's 25th anniversary. In celebration of its 30th anniversary, the film was remastered in 4K and was released on 4K Blu-ray, including extra content, on August 22, 2023.

=== Marketing ===
Disney has extensively marketed the film and its characters across many forms of media and memorabilia, including action figures, books, games, art crafts, and fashion products. Jack Skellington, Sally, Pajama Jack, and the Mayor have been made into bendable figures, Sally has been made into an action figure and a Halloween costume. Various Disneyland and the branching theme parks host attractions featuring Nightmare characters, particularly during Halloween and Christmas seasons. Since 2001, Disneyland has given its Haunted Mansion Holiday attraction a Nightmare Before Christmas theme for the holiday season. It features characters, decorations and music from the film, in addition to Mickey's Not-So-Scary Halloween Party and Mickey's Halloween Party featuring the film's characters. Additionally, Jack hosts the Halloween Screams and Not So Spooky Spectacular! fireworks shows at Magic Kingdom (where the host is Ghost Host) and Disneyland (where the host is Jack himself), as well as the Frightfully Fun Parade.

== Reception ==
=== Box office ===
Around the release of the film, Hoberman was quoted, "I hope Nightmare goes out and makes a fortune. If it does, great. If it doesn't, that doesn't negate the validity of the process. The budget was less than any Disney blockbuster so it doesn't have to earn Aladdin-sized grosses to satisfy us." The film earned $50 million in the United States in its initial theatrical run and was regarded as a moderate sleeper hit. The Nightmare Before Christmas made an additional $11.1 million in box office gross in its 2006 reissue. The 2007, 2008, 2009, 2020, 2023, 2024, 2025, and 2026 reissues earned $15.9 million, $2.6 million, $2.6 million, $10.4 million, $6.1 million, $966,637, and $2.3 million respectively, increasing the film's total box office gross to $111 million. It would also finish in top 10 during the first three-day weekend of its 2024 re-release, grossing $2.4 million.

=== Critical response ===
The Nightmare Before Christmas opened to generally positive reviews. On Rotten Tomatoes, The Nightmare Before Christmas holds a rating of 95% based on 106 reviews, with an average rating of 8.6/10. The site's critics consensus reads, "The Nightmare Before Christmas is a stunningly original and visually delightful work of stop-motion animation." On Metacritic, the film has a weighted average score of 82 out of 100, based on 30 critics, indicating "universal acclaim". Audiences surveyed by CinemaScore gave the film an average grade "B+" on an A+ to F scale. Roger Ebert praised the film's visual inventiveness: "One of the many pleasures of Tim Burton's The Nightmare Before Christmas is that there is not a single recognizable landscape in it. Everything looks strange and haunting. Even Santa Claus would be difficult to recognize without his red-and-white uniform." He wrote that it presented a world "that is as completely new as the worlds we saw for the first time in such films as Metropolis, The Cabinet of Dr. Caligari and Star Wars. What all of these films have in common is a visual richness, so abundant they deserve more than one viewing." He wrote that "The songs by Danny Elfman are fun too, a couple of them using lyrics so clever they could be updated from Gilbert & Sullivan. And the choreography, liberated from gravity and reality, has an energy of its own, as when the furniture, the architecture, and the very landscape itself gets in on the act." He notes that "some of the Halloween creatures might be a tad scary for smaller children, but this is the kind of movie older kids will eat up; it has the kind of offbeat, subversive energy that tells them wonderful things are likely to happen." Peter Travers of Rolling Stone called it a restoration of "originality and daring to the Halloween genre. This dazzling mix of fun and fright also explodes the notion that animation is kid stuff. ... It's 74 minutes of timeless movie magic." James Berardinelli stated "The Nightmare Before Christmas has something to offer just about everyone. For the kids, it's a fantasy celebrating two holidays. For the adults, it's an opportunity to experience some light entertainment while marveling at how adept Hollywood has become at these techniques. There are songs, laughs, and a little romance. In short, The Nightmare Before Christmas does what it intends to: entertain." Desson Thomson of The Washington Post enjoyed the film's similarities to the writings of Oscar Wilde and the Brothers Grimm, as well as The Cabinet of Dr. Caligari and other German Expressionist films. Michael A. Morrison discusses the influence of Dr. Seuss' How the Grinch Stole Christmas! on the film, writing that Jack parallels the Grinch and Zero parallels Max, the Grinch's dog. Philip Nel writes that the film "challenges the wisdom of adults through its trickster characters", contrasting Jack as a "good trickster" with Oogie Boogie, whom he also compares with Seuss' Dr. Terwilliker as a bad trickster. Entertainment Weekly reports that fan reception of these characters borders on obsession, profiling Laurie and Myk Rudnick, a couple whose "degree of obsession with [the] film is so great that ... they named their son after the real-life person that a character in the film is based on." This enthusiasm for the characters has also been profiled as having spread beyond North America to Japan. Yvonne Tasker notes "the complex characterization seen in The Nightmare Before Christmas".

=== Accolades ===
The film was nominated for both the Academy Award for Best Visual Effects and the Hugo Award for Best Dramatic Presentation. Nightmare won the Saturn Award for Best Fantasy Film, while Elfman won Best Music. Selick and the animators were also nominated for their work. Elfman was nominated for the Golden Globe Award for Best Original Score. The film ranked #1 on Rotten Tomatoes' "Top 25 Best Christmas Movies" list.

== Possible sequel ==
In 2001, Disney began to consider producing a sequel, but rather than using stop motion, they wanted to use computer animation. Burton convinced Disney to drop the idea. "I was always very protective of [The Nightmare Before Christmas], not to do sequels or things of that kind," Burton explained. "You know, Jack visits Thanksgiving world or other kinds of things just because I felt the movie had a purity to it and the people that like it, because it's a mass-market kind of thing, it was important to kind of keep that purity of it." The 2004 video game The Nightmare Before Christmas: Oogie's Revenge did serve as a sequel of the film, with Capcom's crew of developers going after Burton for advice and having the collaboration of the film's art director, Deane Taylor. In 2009, Selick said he would do a film sequel if he and Burton could create a good story for it. In February 2019, it was reported that a new Nightmare Before Christmas film was in the works with Disney considering either a stop-motion sequel or live-action remake. In October 2019, Chris Sarandon expressed interest on reprising his role as Jack Skellington if a sequel film ever materializes. On February 22, 2021, Disney Publishing announced that a sequel was given to the 1993 film in the form of a young adult novel, released as Long Live the Pumpkin Queen. It was written by Shea Ernshaw and features Sally as the main character, told through her point-of-view, with events taking place after the film. The book was released on August 2, 2022. In October 2023, Selick stated that he would like to do a prequel film about how Jack became king of Halloween Town. The following month, however, Burton said that he did not want to see any further projects in that universe. In August 2024, Selick expressed doubt that a sequel would ever materialize, not wanting to "beat [the film] to death."

== Related media ==
In the book The Nightmare Before Christmas (2025), the authors note the film's long-standing fandom and presence within popular culture. This includes a proliferation of merchandise surrounding it ranging from action figures, clothing, board games, novels, comics, and jewelry.

=== Toys and games ===
Various action figures were released since the film's release, including ten from Hasbro in 1993. Alec Plowman in The Nightmare Before Christmas (2025) found these action figures "uncharacteristically detailed" for figures of the era with an emphasis on screen accuracy of the characters and being released with display stands. Plowman said this was due to rise of the nascent adult collector market for toys that was emerging in the 1990s. Other brands would release toys for the film in the 21st century including NECA and Funko. A collectible card game based on the film called The Nightmare Before Christmas TCG was released in 2005 by NECA. The game was designed by Quixotic Games founder Andrew Parks Quixotic Games also developed The Nightmare Before Christmas Party Game that was released in 2007 by NECA. A The Nightmare Before Christmas-themed Jenga game was issued with orange, purple and black blocks with Jack Skellington heads on them. The set comes in a coffin-shaped box instead of the normal rectangular box. On September 15, 2020, a Nightmare Before Christmas-themed tarot card deck and guidebook was released and the illustration was done by Abigail Larson. On October 27, 2023, Disney partnered with Mattel to produce a Jack and Sally doll under their Monster High toyline.

=== Books, comics, and manga ===
In 1993, a pop-up book based on the film was released on October 1. Another pop-up book calendar titled Nightmare Before Christmas Pop-Up Book and Advent Calendar was released September 29, 2020. Disney Press released a Tim Burton's The Nightmare Before Christmas Party Cookbook: Recipes and Crafts for the Perfect Spooky Party on August 21, 2017. A behind-the-scenes art book titled Tim Burton's Nightmare Before Christmas: The Film, the Art, the Vision was released on October 14, 1993, and a Disney Editions Deluxe edition was published July 28, 2009. In 2006, a picture book containing the poem Tim Burton wrote that originated the film was released on August 15. In celebration of the film's 20th anniversary, the poem was re-released with a hardcover edition in 2013. On July 20, 2009, an illustrated book covering the Haunted Mansion Holiday attraction's rendition of "The Twelve Days of Christmas" song titled Nightmare Before Christmas: The 13 Days of Christmas was published. In celebration of the film's 25th anniversary, a book and CD, featuring narration and sound effects, was released on July 3, 2018. In honor of the film's 25th anniversary, a Cinestory Comic made by Disney and published by Joe Books LTD was released on September 26, 2017. A graphic novel retelling of the film by Joe Books LTD was released on July 31, 2018, and digital and hardcover versions were released August 25, 2020. On November 26, 2020, a novel retelling of the film version was released as part of the Disney Animated Classics series. In 2021, another version of Nightmare Before Christmas 13 Days of Christmas came out on July 6 and was soon followed by Little Golden Books's release of their adaptation of Nightmare Before Christmas on July 13, 2021.

In 2017, Tokyopop secured exclusive licensing for two manga adaptions for Nightmare Before Christmas, with the first manga being an adaptation of the film's plot line, with art by Jun Asuka, released October 17. The second manga, a fully colored series illustrated by Kei Ishiyama and titled Zero's Journey, chronicles the adventures of Jack's dog, Zero, in his experiences beginning in Christmas Town after accidentally getting separated from Jack, who tries to find him, and acts as a sequel to the film, with Tim Burton's story approval. The 20 issues were first published monthly, starting on October 2, and then collected into four full-color graphic novels, with a black-and-white collector's edition manga edition as well. Starting on July 21, 2021, Tokyopop released another sequel manga centered around Sally, titled The Nightmare Before Christmas: Mirror Moon, written by Mallory Reaves and fully-colored series illustrated by Gabriella Chianello, and Nataliya Torretta. The first two issues will be collected into a graphic novel that is slated to be released on October 26. A novelization of the film written by Daphne Skinner was published on January 1, 1994. On November 1, 2022, Tokyopop announced a full-colored graphic novel series titled Disney Tim Burton's The Nightmare Before Christmas: The Battle for Pumpkin King, which centers around the friendship and rivalry between a young Jack Skellington and Oogie Boogie. The graphic novel consisted of five issues, starting with the first release in May 2023, and the full graphic novel edition is available in September 2023.

On August 2, 2022, a young adult novel titled Long Live the Pumpkin Queen by Shea Ernshaw was released, focusing on Sally as she struggles with the demands and expectations as the Pumpkin Queen of Halloween Town. The novel introduced new characters and explored Sally's past, as well as exploring other holiday worlds as Sally and Jack tackle a mysterious villain Sally has accidentally unleashed. A graphic novel adaptation of the novel was released on July 1, 2025.

A novelization for The Nightmare Before Christmas, written by Megan Shepherd, was released on July 4, 2023, to celebrate the film's 30th anniversary. On July 20, 2023, Shepherd revealed that she will be writing a sequel to Ernshaw's Pumpkin Queen book, titled Hour of the Pumpkin Queen, which was released on July 8, 2025. A graphic novel adaptation for Hour of the Pumpkin Queen is set to be released on April 13, 2027.

Shepherd wrote the final novel, Shadow Over the Pumpkin Queen, which was released on July 7, 2026, alongside a companion book to the Pumpkin Queen series written by Mari Mancusi, Sally's Journal: Notes from Halloween Town and Beyond.

On July 19, 2023, Disney announced that it is partnering with Dynamite Entertainment to publish new comics based on the film, with the first project being written by Torunn Grønbekk. On August 22, 2023, Epic Ink published a cultural book titled "Disney Tim Burton's The Nightmare Before Christmas Beyond Halloween Town: The Story, the Characters, and the Legacy'" by writer Emily Zemler. In January 2026, Dynamite released an on-going comic series titled "The Nightmare Before Christmas: The Shiver of Christmas Town'", written by Torunn Grønbekk and art by Edu Mwnna.

=== Video games ===
Two Nightmare Before Christmas video games were released in the 2000s: The Nightmare Before Christmas: Oogie's Revenge (2004) and The Nightmare Before Christmas: The Pumpkin King (2005). Oogie's Revenge was released first in Japan, with IGN editor Ivan Sulic noting that was due to the film being far more popular in that country than it was in North America. The game acts as a direct narrative sequel set one year after the events of the film. It includes contributions of voice actors and some crew of the film, including the art director.

The Nightmare Before Christmas is also present in the Disney and Square Enix video game series Kingdom Hearts. In Kingdom Hearts, Kingdom Hearts: Chain of Memories, Kingdom Hearts II, and Kingdom Hearts: 358/2 Days, the movie is featured as a playable world named "Halloween Town". The Nightmare Before Christmas is also featured in Disney Twisted-Wonderland in two seasonal events, in which the cast is transported into the world through a magic book. A twisted version of Jack Skellington named Skully J. Graves appears in the first event, "Lost in the Book with Tim Burton's The Nightmare Before Christmas ~The First Halloween~", and a twisted version of Oogie Boogie named Swing appears in the second event, "Lost in the Book with Tim Burton's The Nightmare Before Christmas ~The First Christmas~".

=== Concerts ===
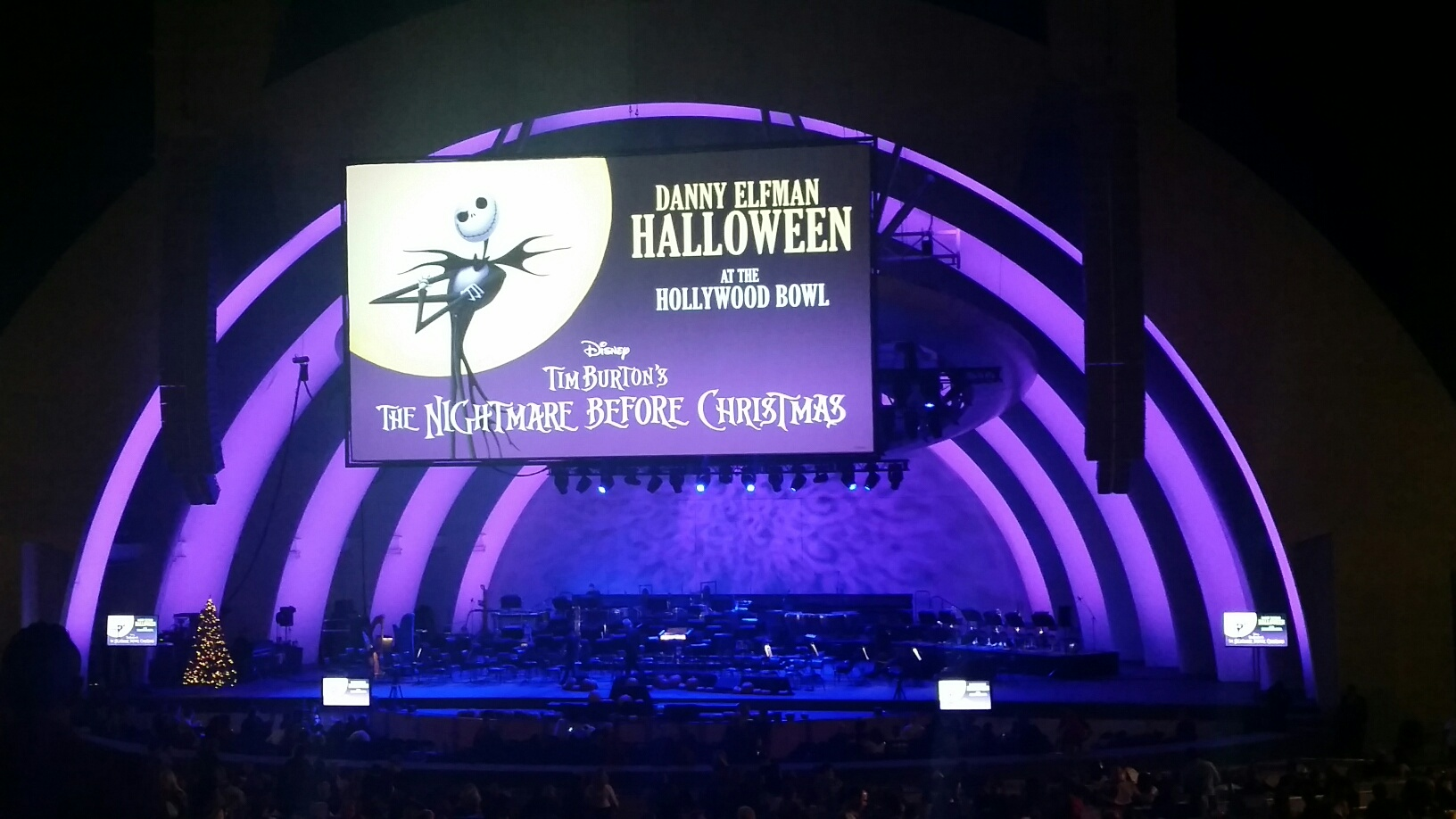
Elfman's The Nightmare Before Christmas live at the Hollywood Bowl, 2015

A live concert, produced by Disney Concerts, was held at the Hollywood Bowl in October 2015 and was followed by subsequent performances in 2016 and 2018. The shows featured Elfman, O'Hara, and Page reprising their roles from the film. In December 2019, this show came to Europe, with dates in Edinburgh, Glasgow, London and Dublin. A one-night-only virtual benefit concert presentation of the film, presented by The Actors Fund and produced by James Monroe Iglehart with the cooperation of Burton, Elfman, Disney and Actors' Equity Association, streamed on October 31, 2020. 100% of the proceeds will benefit the Lymphoma Research Foundation, as a response to the COVID-19 pandemic and its impact on the performing arts. The cast included Iglehart as Oogie Boogie, along with Rafael Casal as Jack Skellington, Adrienne Warren as Sally, Danny Burstein as Santa Claus and the Narrator, Nik Walker as Lock, Lesli Margherita as Shock and Rob McClure as Barrel. Rounding out the cast were Kathryn Allison, Jenni Barber, Erin Elizabeth Clemons, Fergie L. Phillipe, Jawan M. Jackson and Brian Gonzalez. In October 2021, Disney hosted a live-to-film concert of Tim Burton's The Nightmare Before Christmas for two nights at LA's Banc of California Stadium on October 29 and 31. The show featured Billie Eilish singing as Sally and Danny Elfman reprising his role as Jack. Ken Page reprised the role of Oogie Boogie, while "Weird Al" Yankovic sang as Shock. The concert included a full orchestra led by acclaimed conductor John Mauceri to perform the film's score and songs live. In October 2021, Disney announced that they were hosting another live-to-film concert at the OVO Arena Wembley in London on December 9 and 10, 2022. The show featured Elfman and Page reprising their respective roles, while John Mauceri returned as conductor alongside the BBC Concert Orchestra. Acclaimed singer and songwriter Phoebe Bridgers took on the role of Sally. In October 2023, Disney hosted another concert from October 27–29 at the Hollywood Bowl. Elfman, Page, Catherine O'Hara, and other guest stars appeared, including Halsey, who shared the role of Sally with O'Hara. However, days before the concert, Halsey dropped out from her role due to a "scheduling conflict". In September 2025, it was announced the show would return to the Hollywood Bowl on October 25 and 26 of that same year. Elfman reprised his role as Jack, with Keith David as Oogie-Boogie, Janelle Monae as Sally, Riki Lindhome as Shock, and John Stamos as Lock.

=== Other media ===
Disney Interactive Studios released an As Told by Emoji animated adaptation of The Nightmare Before Christmas in 2016, which can be found on their official YouTube channel. In 2024, Lego released a two-thousand-piece set, which includes three locations from the film: Spiral Hill, Jack Skellington's house, and Halloween Town Hall.

== See also ==
- List of cult films
- List of ghost films
- List of films set around Halloween
- List of Christmas films
- Santa Claus in film
