= The Nightmare Before Christmas: Oogie's Revenge =

2004 video game

Tim Burton’s The Nightmare Before Christmas: Oogie's Revenge
- North American cover art for the PlayStation 2
- Developer: Capcom Production Studio 3
- Publishers: JP/EU: Capcom; NA: Buena Vista Games
- Producers: Tatsuya Minami; Hironobu Takeshita; Naoto Tominaga
- Composers: Kengo Hagiwara; Masaya Tsunemoto
- Platforms: PlayStation 2 Xbox
- Release: PlayStation 2: JP: October 21, 2004; JP: September 29, 2005 (Premium Pack); EU: September 30, 2005; NA: October 10, 2005; JP: March 15, 2007 (CapKore); Xbox: EU: September 30, 2005; NA: October 10, 2005
- Genres: Action-adventure, hack and slash
- Mode: Single-player

Tim Burton’s The Nightmare Before Christmas: Oogie's Revenge (Note: Released in Japan as The Nightmare Before Christmas: Boogie's Revenge (ナイトメアービフォアクリスマス ブギーの逆襲, Naitomeā Bifoa Kurisumasu: Bugī no Gyakushū)) is a 2004 action-adventure game developed by Capcom for the PlayStation 2 and Xbox. The game was published by Capcom in Japan and Europe, and by Buena Vista Games in North America. Based on the 1993 film The Nightmare Before Christmas and set one year after the film, the game follows Jack Skellington as he attempts to defeat a resurrected Oogie Boogie and reclaim Halloween Town from him.

Oogie's Revenge was released at the same time in North America as The Nightmare Before Christmas: The Pumpkin King for Game Boy Advance, which serves as a prequel to the film.

== Gameplay ==
Gameplay in the game is like the Devil May Cry series, but easier for younger and less experienced players. Both titles were made by Capcom. Jack can transform into Santa Jack and the Pumpkin King later in the game. Santa Jack can lay down three types of presents to thwart his enemies, while the Pumpkin King form can set them aflame or lay down a bomb. The game consists of 24 chapters (and two secret chapters). Players must fight numerous enemies, perform platforming tasks, and occasionally solve puzzles to progress through the story. The player's performance in each mission is given a letter grade of A, B, C, or D, with an additional top grade of S. Grades are based on the time taken to complete the mission, the longest combo performed, the damage done to Jack, and the number of enemies surprised.

The doors of the various holiday worlds are obtained when a certain level is completed, though they are simply plot items and do not grant the player access to other holiday-themed towns. Later chapters, however, allow the player to enter Christmas Town. Each of Jack's costumes have different abilities. Santa Jack (which is obtained once Doctor Finkelstein is defeated) can throw out presents to stun enemies or freeze enemies in ice, and the Pumpkin King (obtained after saving Sally from a large spider) can burn enemies and open doors by burning them. There are several unlockable costumes, though they do not grant any additional abilities.

== Plot ==
A year after the film, Jack Skellington once again feels Halloween has become dull and repetitive. He talks with Dr. Finkelstein about improving the next Halloween with new scares and discoveries. The doctor gives Jack the "Soul Robber", a green, whip-like weapon. He then leaves town to look for new frights, leaving the doctor in charge, and the equally bored Lock, Shock, and Barrel take advantage of Jack's absence to revive Oogie Boogie, who immediately begins plotting his revenge. On December 23, Sally, a prisoner in Dr. Finkelstein's laboratory, manages to send a magical paper airplane to find Jack to warn him of what has happened.

Jack returns to Halloween Town on Christmas Eve afternoon and is immediately attacked by monsters. After fending them off with the Soul Robber, Jack learns of Oogie's revival and that Dr. Finkelstein had caused the citizens to boobytrap the entire town. In the town hall, Jack finds and confronts Oogie's shadow. After defeating the shadow, he finds the Halloween Holiday Door.

After securing the town square, Jack learns that Oogie's monsters had kidnapped Sally and taken her to the cemetery. Jack fights through Oogie's monsters as he tries to find where they have taken him, despite Lock's best attempts to fend him off. He finds Sally in a crypt where a giant spider clings her to the ceiling and attacks Jack. Jack defeats the spider, saves Sally, and finds the Valentine's Day Holiday Door. When Jack and Sally walk out of the crypt, she gives Jack the key to Dr. Finkelstein's laboratory and gives him the idea to use his Pumpkin King powers to defeat Oogie's monsters.

Despite Shock's attempts to stop Jack, he makes it to the doctor's lair at the top of his tower, and finds that all of his evil actions were because Oogie had replaced his brain. Fending off the doctor's deadly machines, Jack returns him to normal by switching his brain back, claiming the St. Patrick's Day Holiday Door in the process. With the doctor and Sally's help, Jack gains his Santa Claus outfit to use booby-trapped presents, which he uses to scare Oogie's monsters out of possessing the pumpkins in the pumpkin patch. Barrel tries to stop Jack by forcing him to navigate the maze he had created in the pumpkin patch, but Jack makes it through and defeats Barrel and his monsters, claiming the Thanksgiving Holiday Door and the key to the residential district.

After freeing the vampire brothers from Oogie's curse, they tell him of Oogie's plan: he had kidnapped the other Holiday Leaders and stolen the Holiday Doors so that they could not return home (which Lock, Shock, and Barrel hid in different areas of the town), and planned to become the Seven Holidays King by taking over the other six holidays as well as Halloween. Jack then rescues the mayor from a cage and confronts Lock, Shock, and Barrel on his roof; after defeating them one last time, claiming the Independence Day Holiday Door, they trigger a trap that sends him into the Oogie Corridor, a subterranean labyrinth filled with lava and booby traps. Jack navigates the corridor and finds a jail where five of the holiday leaders are imprisoned, but Santa is conspicuously absent. At the end of the maze, Jack finds Oogie on a giant roulette wheel, where he says that he plans to take revenge on Santa personally. Jack defeats Oogie, but discovers that it was only his shadow again and that the Holiday Door he was guarding was the Easter door, not the Christmas door. Oogie's shadow reveals that the real Oogie is in Christmas Town before exploding.

Returning to town, Jack instructs the mayor to free the other Holiday Leaders, then heads to the Hinterlands, having a heartfelt moment with Sally before navigating the mystic forest to replace the Holiday Doors on their trees, destroying the Holiday Oogie Doors that Oogie replaced the real Holiday Doors with in the process. Halfway through the process, Jack fights Oogie's two strongest monsters and claims the Christmas Door from them, using it to leave for Christmas Town as soon as he finishes.

Jack undoes Oogie's damage to the town and foils his attempt to kill Santa, and Oogie flies off in Santa's sleigh, but Sally arrives with the skeleton reindeer and coffin sleigh to give Santa the resources to make his deliveries. Oogie is scared out of the sky by a booby-trapped present that an elf had snuck into the sleigh before takeoff, and he falls into the seven holidays' junkyard. In a fit of rage, he absorbs the waste and insects in the environment and becomes a giant version of himself to beat Jack. The Pumpkin King defeats Oogie, leaving only an empty patchwork sack as his bugs spill out, and Santa thanks Jack for saving his life and his holiday.

Afterward, Jack realizes that his home and loved ones are something more important than new discoveries. Like in the film, the game ends with Jack and Sally embracing on top of Spiral Hill.

== Development ==
The game was showcased at E3 2005.

== Reception ==
Reception

Aggregate scores
Aggregator	Score
GameRankings	(Xbox) 66.46% (PS2) 64.95%
Metacritic	(Xbox) 65/100 (PS2) 65/100

Review scores
Publication	Score
1Up.com	C
Eurogamer	5/10
Famitsu	29/40
Game Informer	5/10
GameSpot	6.4/10
GameSpy	3/5
GameTrailers	6.2/10
GameZone	7.6/10
IGN	6/10
Official U.S. PlayStation Magazine	3.5/5
Official Xbox Magazine (US)	7.1/10
The Times	5/5

Reception to the game was mostly mixed.

GameRankings gave the game a score of 66.46% for Xbox and 64.95% for PlayStation 2, while Metacritic gave it a score of 65 out of 100 for both console versions, indicating "mixed or average reviews".

IGN reviewed the game, saying, "Unpolished gameplay and poor pacing won't ever make for an outstanding product regardless of however endearing the source material may be" and gave the game a 6/10 rating overall.

Gametrailers.com criticized the game for its camera and story, which they believed copied too much from the movie instead of coming up with something truly original.

However, The Times gave it all five stars and said: "This adventure looks great, its landscape dominated by crooked buildings and brooding grey skies; navigating Jack is simple and the characters are all well realised. A perfect children’s game".
