= Haunted Mansion Holiday =

Seasonal overlay of attraction

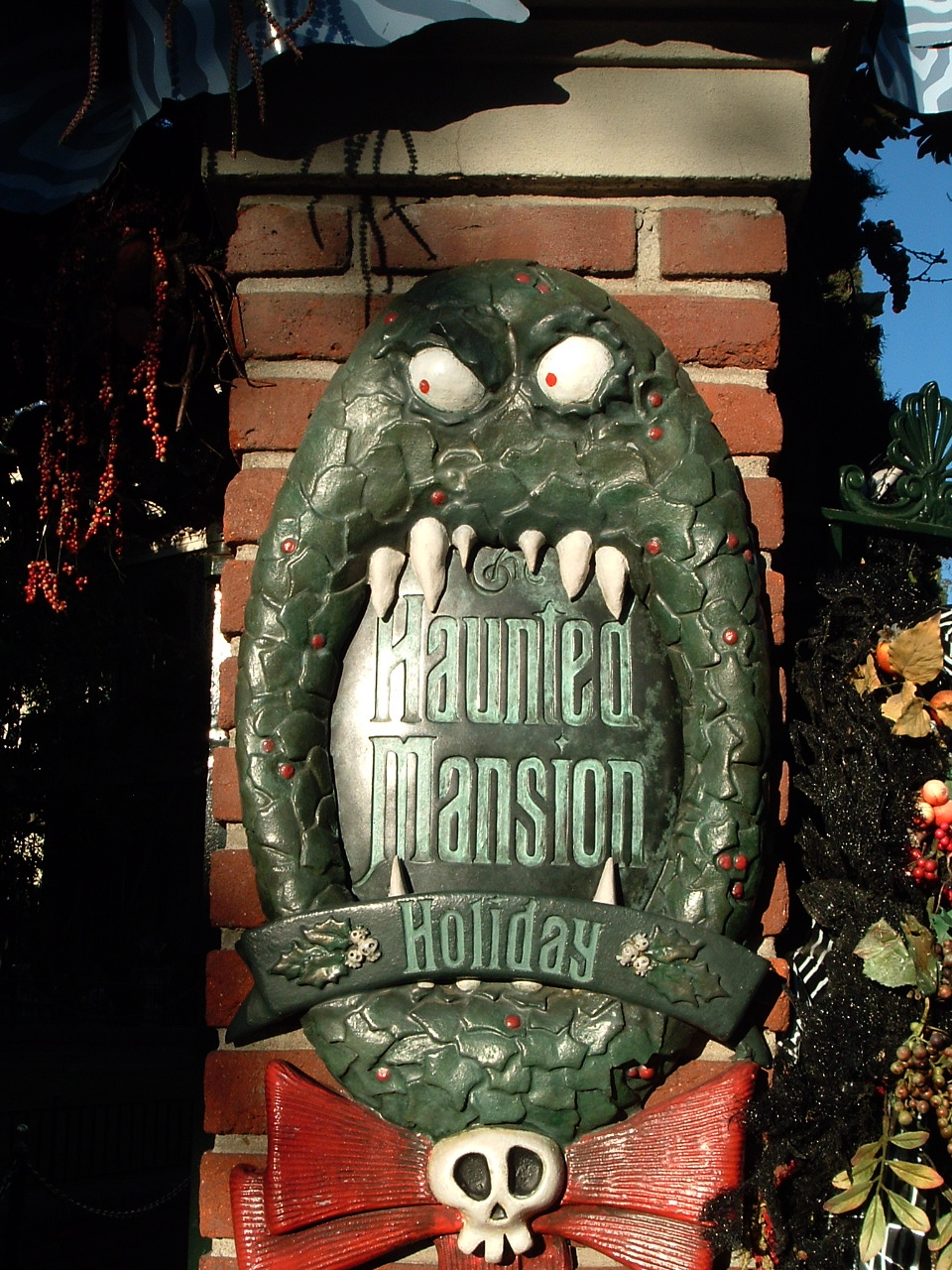

Disneyland
- Area: New Orleans Square
- Status: Operating
- Opening date: October 3, 2001

Tokyo Disneyland
- Name: Haunted Mansion Holiday Nightmare
- Area: Fantasyland
- Status: Operating
- Opening date: September 15, 2004

Ride statistics
- Attraction type: Omnimover
- Manufacturers: Arrow Development (Disneyland)
- Designer: Walt Disney Imagineering
- Theme: The Nightmare Before Christmas
- Music: Gordon Goodwin (original); Danny Elfman/John Debney (A Musical History of Disneyland)
- Speed: 3 mph (4.8 km/h)
- Vehicle type: D
- Riders per vehicle: 2–3
- Audio-animatronics: Yes
- Host: Ghost Host (voiced by Corey Burton in Anaheim; Ponta Mitsui in Tokyo)
- Season: August–January
- Must transfer from wheelchair

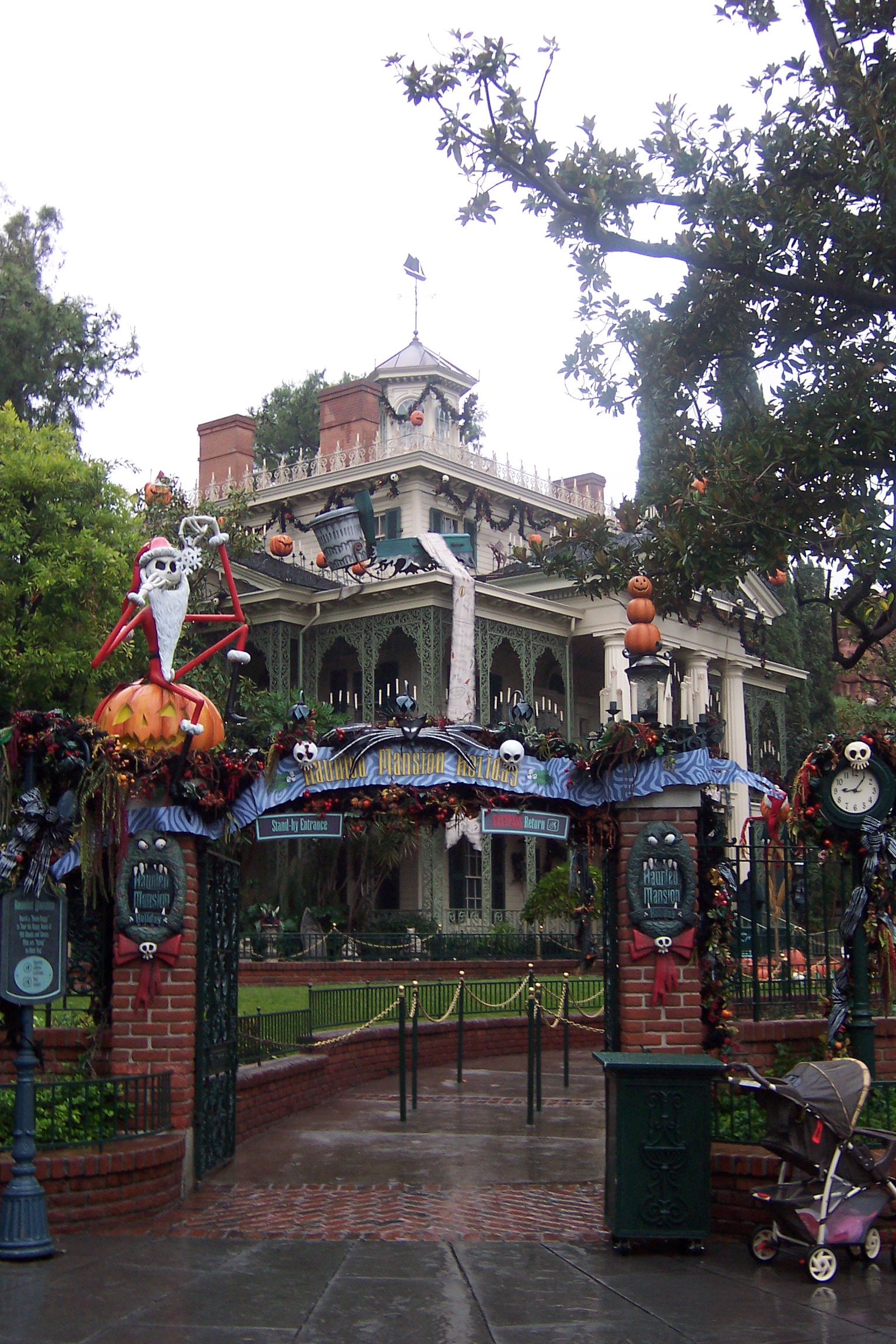
Exterior view of the mansion at Disneyland

Haunted Mansion Holiday (known as Haunted Mansion Holiday Nightmare in Tokyo Disneyland) is a seasonal overlay of The Haunted Mansion attraction at Disneyland and Tokyo Disneyland that blends the settings and characters of the original Haunted Mansion with those of the 1993 film The Nightmare Before Christmas. Taking inspiration from "The Night Before Christmas", the attraction retells the story of Jack Skellington (as "Sandy Claws") visiting the Haunted Mansion on Christmas Eve, leaving holiday chaos in his wake.

The Haunted Mansion typically closes for two weeks in early August so it can be converted into the Haunted Mansion Holiday. The overlaid attraction is then open to guests from late August through early January before being closed again to remove the overlay.

== History ==
Two similar overlays – Country Bear Christmas Special (1984) and It's a Small World Holiday (1997) – had already been successful for some time when Haunted Mansion Holiday was developed. Initially, Disney considered doing a retelling of Charles Dickens's A Christmas Carol, but decided against it due to the attraction's setting in New Orleans Square and the incongruity of bringing Santa Claus into the eerie environment of the Haunted Mansion. Instead, they decided to base it on The Nightmare Before Christmas after considering which Disney character would celebrate Christmas in the Haunted Mansion, should Santa Claus ever land there on his journey. Steve Davison took the idea and worked with Walt Disney Creative Entertainment to develop the overlay.

One issue Disney had to deal with was the fact that many of the key performers in the original attraction – Paul Frees, Leota Toombs, Eleanor Audley, most of the singing busts, and almost all of the original voice actors – had died years earlier. Frees was replaced in his role as the Ghost Host by Corey Burton, who had done voiceover work with Disney before and had also served as Frees's protégé prior to the latter's death. Toombs's daughter, Kim Irvine, resembled her mother and was thus chosen to perform in her place as Madame Leota, with Susan Blakeslee (impersonating Audley and whom she once trained under), providing the character's voice. The singing busts were topped with Jack-O-Lanterns and given computer-animated singing projections. New voice actors were picked for the graveyard ghosts that sound similar to the originals.

Haunted Mansion Holiday opened October 3, 2001, and quickly became popular with guests, leading to the attraction's FastPass machines being activated during the overlay (they are now always active). On September 13, 2013 (Friday the 13th), the Haunted Mansion at Disneyland opened to the public outfitted with new effects and set pieces in celebration of its 13th year. Walt Disney World Resort and Disneyland Paris do not have seasonal overlays. Outside of Phantom Manor, guests can get their photo taken with Jack and Sally.

The overlay was not presented in 2020 at either Disneyland or Tokyo Disneyland in response to the COVID-19 pandemic. Disneyland remained closed from March 2020 to early 2021 due to two stay-at-home orders and closure of theme parks issued by California Governor Gavin Newsom, while the since-reopened Tokyo Disneyland opted not to offer certain seasonal offerings through at least March 2021.

On July 25, 2024, Disneyland announced that Haunted Mansion Holiday will be reopened early on July 29, 2024, prior to the start of the Halloween season. Since the beginning of January 2024, the Disneyland version of Haunted Mansion ride had begun another extensive refurbishment to reform and expand the outdoor queue, modify the nearby Magnolia Park in New Orleans Square, and add a gift shop at the ride's exit.

== Storyline ==
The Haunted Mansion Holiday takes place shortly after the events of the film it conjoins with, The Nightmare Before Christmas, where Jack Skellington, who tried to create his very own twisted Christmas in a Halloween-style overlay in the movie, now discovers the Haunted Mansion, home to 999 Happy Haunts. Deciding to spread joy to the mansion's gloomy residents for the holidays, Jack and his creepy crew from Halloween Town bring hundreds of Jack's original evil Christmas presents and decorations to the manor and deck the haunting grounds for a thrilling and chilling holiday for the Grim Grinning Ghosts inhabiting the abandoned house, setting the stage for the ride itself.

== Attraction ==
The outside of the mansion has been covered in both jack-o-lanterns and Halloween-style Christmas decorations. On the roof is Jack Skellington's coffin sleigh and stretched from the roof to the ground is his comical "Christmas Equation". There is also the countdown clock from Halloween Town that tells how many days are left until Christmas. A music box track from Disneyland Paris's Phantom Manor plays in the outdoor areas. At Tokyo Disneyland, the mansion does not have a countdown clock or a Christmas Equation hanging from the roof because of the design differences between the mansions. Instead, pumpkin snowmen can be seen and orchestrations from the movie and ride play in the queue area.

Guests are then ushered into the foyer, which has been decorated with skull wreaths and such. The Ghost Host begins to tell the story of the attraction in rhyme. From there, guests proceed into one of the two portrait chambers. At Tokyo, a painting of Jack transforming from the Pumpkin King to his Santa Claus guise replaces the Aging Man changing portrait.

Guests then enter the portrait gallery. The stretching portraits have been replaced with stained-glass pictures depicting innocent Christmas scenes with wreaths as their frames. When the doors close, the chamber goes dark and begins to stretch. The pictures burst into shards, and luminescent paintings of Halloween Town's Christmas vision emerge, depicting Jack as Santa Claus riding his coffin sleigh high above the Mansion, a man-eating wreath, scary toys, Santa Claus opening a giant sack as ghosts rise up and a giant carnivorous snake. The Ghost Host begins reciting a dark variation of the poem Twas the Night Before Christmas poem as eerie music plays, extensively featuring a choir. The suspense builds until lightning crashes and Jack's face appears in the ceiling above, cackling, "Happy Holidays, everyone!"; this replaces the hanging body of the Ghost Host. His laughter fills the room, a woman screams in a high pitch and everything goes pitch black. In 2013, Jack's face is replaced by a new animated projection of him and Zero and the hanging body of the Ghost Host remains intact.

As the lights return to normal, the doors open, leading into the portrait hallway. The changing portraits here have also been replaced with ones depicting:

- Sally holding a small Christmas Tree that burns making Sally sad.
- The Haunted Mansion turning into Haunted Mansion Holiday.
- Jack Skellington dressed as Santa Claus holding a present and turning into the way he normally looks holding a jack-o-lantern.
- A Snowman that turns into a snowman made of pumpkins.
- Santa Claus in his sleigh who turns into Jack Skellington dressed as Santa Claus flying a sleigh that's pulled by the Skeletal Reindeer from the film.

The choir returns as the song Kidnap the Sandy Claws begins to play. A snowstorm appears to be taking place outside the windows and the three musicians from the movie are also standing outside. The staring busts have spider-webs in front of them that glisten with the words "NOEL" and "HO-HO-HO." The loading area is decorated with even more Halloween and Christmas décor and there is a huge animated Christmas card with many of the characters from the movie celebrating the season. The card is much of a treat to the eyes itself, featuring the words "MERRY CHRISTMAS" at the bottom of the card, where the message changes to "SCARY CHRISTMAS" intermittently. At Tokyo, there is no portrait hall like Disneyland's. Instead, immediately after the portrait chamber, the guests enter the loading area, which is decorated with orange Christmas lights and Halloween pumpkins. After boarding, the guests glide underneath a landing from where Jack, Sally, and the Vampire Teddy greet guests. The ride-through Portrait Corridor features portraits of the film's characters performing various activities and watching as the guests go by. Orange Christmas lights wrap around the staring busts in the library as Zero wraps a floating tree made out of books with tinsel garland. In the music room, guests see a life-size audio-animatronic Sally, seeming depressed and sitting in the chair next to the ghostly piano that the Vampire Teddy plays. The vehicles then move up the stairs, passing terrified green cockroaches in cages with gift tags that read "For Oogie." At the top of the stairs, Oogie Boogie's shadow appears and turns into a Christmas tree shape in the full moon above. The original black-lighted rubber spiders remain.

At Anaheim Disneyland, upon boarding the vehicles (referred to as Black Christmas Sleighs in the overlay), guests ascend the staircase. At the top, there are piles of presents with the Vampire Teddy sitting on them, fishing for humans. As the Ghost Host continues telling the story, Zero is now seen floating in the endless hallway in place of the candelabra. The moving suit of armor wears a pumpkin mask and has garland wrapped around it. A pile of dog bones in front of the hallway and a wreath made of dog bones adorns the top of the hall. On one floating bone, a tag reads "To Zero". Presents sit in the chair and poinsettias reside next to that chair.

The corpse trapped in the coffin in the conservatory is unchanged, but the Vampire Teddy now sits on it, hammering nails back in. A tag reading "Do Not Open Till Xmas" hangs from the lid. The dead funeral flowers have sprung to life and now perform the song "Kidnap the Sandy Claws". The corridor of doors is now filled with the same comically vicious flowers, all singing loudly, although the doors and the sound effects that they play are still the same. Guests then pass underneath a large yellow-eyed man-eating wreath with teeth, which all the flowers seem to be connected to. The demonic grandfather clock and shadow claw remain the same but now has a tag that says "To Leota, Special Gifts for you - Sandy Claws".

Guests then enter the séance room. Madame Leota is in a Christmas ornament and floats along with several glowing bottles surrounding her and now chants "The 13 Days of Christmas" while the Vampire Teddy sits on the top of the chair behind Leota's table, ringing two tiny bells with the séance. A bewitched nutcracker with eyes glowing green moves its mouth in unison with Leota. The floating instruments are replaced with huge floating tarot cards, depicting Leota's 13 Christmas gifts of which she is chanting. In Tokyo, the raven remains in this scene and Leota is not in a Christmas ornament and is covered in candles with Lock, Shock, and Barrel looking at her through a window in the back of the room.

The Sleighs then move into the ballroom. The ghosts here are the same, but the decorations have changed. The table is set for a Christmas party and a huge gingerbread house sits in the center of the table. An immense dead Christmas tree (with one live branch at the top) covered in candles and spiders with lights now sits in the middle of the dance floor, but the ghosts waltz right through it. Zero floats above the scene near the tree as the duelists shoot at him. The curtains at the top of the staircase in the back of the hall have opened, revealing the mansion's library, complete with a floating tree made of books. In Tokyo, Jack and Sally's shadows are seen exchanging presents under the mistletoe behind that curtain instead. Also, instead of a gingerbread house, a giant cake is in the middle of the table.

The guests are then taken to the attic, where most of the usual props and characters have been replaced with a clutter of all sorts of creepy toys and presents. A huge snake coils around the room with a "naughty and nice" list in its mouth. Throughout the room, some of the evil toys come to life as the guests pass by, including three jack-in-the-boxes (one featuring a stylized skull, another a black cat's head, and another a jack-o-lantern using the old attic pop-up ghosts from the original ride), a bullet hole-ridden duck, a cymbal-crashing Oogie Boogie doll, and a monstrous train on tentacle-like tracks.

As the guests leave the attic and head out onto the balcony, The Hatbox Ghost has adorned the top of his top hat with a decorative Christmas Skull pin and puts a Santa Claus hat on top of the nearby stack of Hatbox. Snowflakes are seen falling instead of ghosts rising as guests go down the stairs next to the balcony and into the graveyard, the guests witness the Vampire Teddy chewing on Christmas lights, threatening to blow a fuse. As the vehicles reach the ground level, they pass by a towering audio-animatronic figure of Jack in his Sandy Claws outfit, wishing the guests a Merry Christmas as a replacement for the wide-eyed caretaker that usually stands in his place during most of the year, with Zero accompanying him in place of the caretaker's dog. The graveyard is now covered in snow and the spiral hill from Halloween Town is featured as a centerpiece covered in glowing pumpkins. The Pop-up ghosts still pop-up and scare guests as they pass, but now they are wearing Santa hats. In 2016, an animatronic Sally is added to the graveyard. The music combines What’s This?, We Wish You A Merry Christmas, Grim Grinning Ghosts, Jolly Old St. Nicholas, and Jingle Bells. The Skeletal reindeer from the film are shown enjoying time in the graveyard with one playing tug-of-war with the howling hellhound, another having tea with other ghosts, and the last one is racing with ghosts on bicycles replacing one of them. The vehicles pass under huge snow angels with pumpkin heads playing trumpets. The singing busts have been topped with jack-o-lanterns at the base of the spiral hill. Before entering the crypt, guests see the Vampire Teddy one last time, playing a trumpet with another pumpkin-headed snow angel above.

The Black Sleighs then enter the crypt, where an audio-animatronic Oogie Boogie stands next to a roulette wheel under black light, offering the guests a game with some strange gifts. Prior to 2003, there was originally an animated mural of Lock, Shock and Barrel. The guests see those bizarre presents instead of the Hitchhiking Ghosts when they go by the mirrors. If the present is a coffin imprinted with a question mark, Lock, Shock and Barrel will pop out from behind each of the three mirrors.

The guests then arrive at the unload area, which is also filled with snow and jack-o-lanterns. As the guests travel up the speed ramp to the exit, a tiny version of Sally (taking the place of Little Leota) is seen thanking Jack as he flies away in his sleigh and tells the guests to hurry back. In Tokyo's version of the final scene, the crypt features Lock, Shock, and Barrel inside some presents, hitching a ride with the guests. Sally bids goodbye and then the guests disembark in a wreath-adorned mausoleum.

== Additions ==
During the 2003 season, Disneyland offered an "Oogie Boogie's Holiday Tricks and Treats" scavenger hunt. Oogie was given hidden cameos throughout the mansion, which guests are asked to look for. For instance, Oogie can be found in shrubbery in the gardens, a shadow on the Christmas card, a doll in the attic, etc.

== Soundtrack ==
The attraction's musical score was originally composed by Gordon Goodwin. It was replaced in 2002 with an adapted score by John Debney (who composed the music for Phantom Manor), based on themes from the film's soundtrack composed by Danny Elfman. Since 2003, Goodwin's original music has been used in the stretching rooms and the exit crypt (where Goodwin's attic music is used), while the rest of Elfman's score remains. Several characters in the ride are voiced by the original actors from the film, and the various sound effects are a mixture of tracks from the original attraction and new ones.

Disneyland CD Cover Artwork

Track listing

1. Up on the Housetop (2:07)
2. Scary Bells (1:52)
3. Over the Graveyards (1:40)
4. Old Mansion Tree (2:01)
5. Wreck the Halls (2:10)
6. We Wish You a Scary Christmas (1:45)
7. The 13 Days of Christmas (2:17)
8. God Rest You Merry Grinning Ghosts (1:53)
9. Tim Burton's The Nightmare Before Christmas Medley (2:30)
  - Includes – Making Christmas/What's This?/Kidnap the Sandy Claws
10. Disneyland Haunted Mansion Holiday Ride-Through Mix (16:20)
  - Includes – Foyer, Elevators, Elevator Exit, Picture Gallery, Loading Zone, Corridor of Doors, Seance Room, Grand Hall, Attic, Graveyard Finale, Hitchhiking Ghosts.

Ride Audio
2001 Version

1. Foyer 2001 (00:0)
2. Stretching Room (1:32)
3. Loading Zone 2001 (2:50)
4. Corridor Of Doors 2001 (5:22)
5. Seance Room 2001 (6:11)
6. Ballroom 2001 (8:22)
7. Attic 2001 (9:28)
8. We Wish You A Scary Christmas (Graveyard Gates) (10:38)
9. We Wish You A Scary Christmas (Graveyard) (11:38)
10. Exit Crypt 2001 (15:03)

2002 Version

1. Queue (00:5)
2. Foyer 2002 (00:47)
3. Stretching Room (2:16)
4. Kidnap The Sandy Claws (Loading Zone) (3:31)
5. Kidnap The Sandy Claws (Corridor Of Doors) (6:12)
6. Seance Room (6:55)
7. Ballroom (Kidnap The Sandy Claws, Making Christmas, Jack's Lament) (9:00)
8. What's This (Attic 2002) (10:09)
9. We Wish You A Scary Christmas (Graveyard Gates) (11:06)
10. We Wish You A Scary Christmas (Graveyard) (12:33)
11. Exit Crypt (Attic 2001) (15:34)
12. Breakdown Message (12:05)

== Incident ==
On October 6, 2025, a woman in her 60s was found unresponsive after riding Haunted Mansion Holiday. She was taken to a local hospital and was pronounced dead later that day. An autopsy was not performed to determine cause of death, but no problems were found with the ride itself.

== Voice cast ==
- Chris Sarandon – Jack Skellington
- Ken Page – Oogie Boogie
- Corey Burton – Ghost Host
- Kath Soucie – Sally
- Susanne Blakeslee – Madame Leota; Kim Irvine (face)

== See also ==
- The Haunted Mansion
- The Nightmare Before Christmas
- Phantom Manor
- Mystic Manor
