= List of The Nightmare Before Christmas characters =

From left to right: Doctor Finkelstein, the Mayor, Sally, Jack, Barrel, Santa Claus, Zero, Lock, Shock and Oogie Boogie

This article lists characters seen in the 1993 film The Nightmare Before Christmas and the video games The Nightmare Before Christmas: The Pumpkin King and The Nightmare Before Christmas: Oogie's Revenge.

== Design ==
The filmmakers constructed 230 puppets to represent the characters in the film, with Jack Skellington having "around four hundred heads", allowing the expression of every possible emotion. Sally's mouth movements "were animated through the replacement method. During the animation process, only Sally's face 'mask' was removed to preserve the order of her long red hair. Sally had ten types of faces, each made with a series of eleven expressions and synchronised mouth movements."

== Main ==
=== Jack Skellington ===
Jack Skellington
- First appearance: The Nightmare Before Christmas (1993)
- Created by: Tim Burton
- Voiced by: Danny Elfman (singing); Chris Sarandon (speaking)
- Alias: Pumpkin King
- Species: Skeleton

The film's protagonist, Jack Skellington is a skeleton who holds the title of The Pumpkin King. He is popular among the residents of Halloween Town for his charming personality and aim to please, as he is well-meaning despite a lack of inhibition. He is in charge of Halloween, but repeating the same routine for years has caused him to feel his inspiration for his own holiday waning. However, after stumbling into Christmas Town, he gains new ideas and inspiration. He also appears in The Nightmare Before Christmas: Oogie's Revenge. He is sung by Danny Elfman on singing and voiced by Chris Sarandon on speaking. Since the film was originally released for adults, as it was thought to be "too dark and scary for kids", in non-English speaking countries, Disney Character Voices International only dubbed the film in a few languages in which adult and kids films are usually dubbed, while in other countries it was released with subtitles. Some versions dubbed only the spoken lines, leaving the songs in English. Jack Skellington made a cameo in the film James and the Giant Peach as the "pirate captain". He also appears in the Robot Chicken episode "Anne Marie's Pride", where he is voiced by Victor Yerrid.

=== Sally ===
Sally
- First appearance: The Nightmare Before Christmas (1993)
- Created by: Tim Burton
- Voiced by: Catherine O'Hara (1993-2026); Kath Soucie (2005-present)
- Species: Living rag doll

Sally is Jack Skellington's love interest, a kind, shy, and determined rag doll who tells him that Christmas and Halloween should not mix and is the only one to have doubts about his Christmas plan. Fiona Apple provides the vocals for "Sally's Song" on the 2006 special edition of The Nightmare Before Christmas: Original Motion Picture Soundtrack, while Amy Lee provides the vocals for "Sally's Song" on Nightmare Revisited. She also appears in Tim Burton's The Nightmare Before Christmas: Oogie's Revenge. She has detachable limbs stuffed with fall leaves and often falls apart, requiring her to sew herself back together, which she carries a set of sewing needles and thread for. She was stolen by Doctor Finkelstein, Halloween Town's resident MAD SCIENTIST, at a young age to be his companion. Their relationship is rather tense, as Finkelstein insists on keeping her imprisoned under the pretext of protecting her from the outside world and not wanting her to discover her original parents who reside in Dream Town in another realm. However, Sally is restless and curious, and despite his attempts to keep her imprisoned, she often manages to escape by sedating him with deadly nightshade. It is this restlessness and a desire for something better in her life that draws her to Jack Skellington. In the beginning of the film, she idolizes and admires him like many residents of Halloween Town. However, she discovers they are connected by the desire for something more in their lives, and her feelings for him intensify. The two refer to each other as "friends", though Jack seems unaware of Sally's true feelings for him. This is because she is too shy to admit them to him, but shows them through her kindness until the end of the film, where she finally confesses to him. On the album to the film, it is mentioned that years later, Sandy Claws returned to Halloween Town and saw Jack had four or five skeleton children. While not confirmed in the original film, the official sequel novel, Long Live the Pumpkin Queen, reveals that she married Jack. Bryan Theiss declares that "Sally is one of those rare fantasy characters we can relate to on a certain level as much as we can to real-world characters on a more literal level." She was voiced by Catherine O'Hara in the film, Disney Parks attractions, and the Gameloft-developed video games Disney Speedstorm and Disney Dreamlight Valley, while Kath Soucie voices her in the Kingdom Hearts video games and The Nightmare Before Christmas: Oogie's Revenge.

=== Oogie Boogie ===
Mr. Oogie Boogie Man
- First appearance: The Nightmare Before Christmas (1993)
- Created by: Tim Burton
- Portrayed by: James Monroe Iglehart (live concerts)
- Voiced by: Ken Page (1993–2024); Keith David (2024–present)
- Alias: Oogie
- Species: Bogeyman

The Oogie Boogie Man is the main antagonist, who is a large burlap sack full of bugs. Oogie Boogie did not appear in Tim Burton's original poem, but Burton later sketched a portrait of what appeared to be a potato sack man with horrible things inside. The Oogie puppet was two feet high, twice the height of the other puppets. Ken Page claims that he based his performance as Oogie as "somewhere between Bert Lahr in The Wizard of Oz and the voice of the demon in The Exorcist". In his autobiography Burton on Burton, Burton says that Oogie Boogie was loosely inspired by Cab Calloway's appearances in several Betty Boop cartoons, and that he asked Danny Elfman to make Oogie's song in Nightmare resemble Calloway's 1931 recording of the song "Minnie the Moocher". Elfman ended up referencing the Betty Boop cartoon The Old Man of the Mountain (1933), which also featured Calloway; Santa's line "Well, what are you going to do?" and Oogie Boogie's response of "I'm gonna do the best I can!" are directly taken from it. As seen on the Special Edition DVD, another idea for Oogie's identity was for him to be Dr. Finkelstein in disguise to take revenge on Jack and Sally, but Burton scrapped the idea and it was not pursued past storyboards,

Under Oogie's orders, Lock, Shock and Barrel kidnap Santa Claus and send him down to Oogie Boogie's lair, where Sally attempts to rescue him after learning of his fate, but is captured. Oogie tortures and tries to kill Sally and Santa Claus, but is foiled by Jack, who pulls a thread loose from him, ripping off the sack covering him and causing most of the bugs inside to fall into the lava. The lead bug is then squashed by Santa, and the rest of the bugs scurry off.

In The Nightmare Before Christmas: The Pumpkin King, it is revealed that Oogie once had his own holiday called Bug Day, which was forgotten by the people of the real world. Oogie escaped, found Halloween Town, and decided that it would be the new Bug Day. He and his army of insects invaded the town and nearly took it over, but Jack was able to stop them and Oogie. Oogie survived and was imprisoned within his underground lair, and Jack warns that if he ever left his lair, it would be "game over!" for him. Oogie complied, but secretly vowed revenge.

In the 2004 video game The Nightmare Before Christmas: Oogie's Revenge, Oogie is resurrected by his henchmen Lock, Shock, and Barrel, who sew him back together. He quickly deceives the residents of Halloween Town and tricks the townspeople into making traps for Jack, stating that Jack would not return if they do not make an even scarier Halloween for next year. He then attempts to become the Seven Holidays King by kidnapping the leaders of the holidays and tries to murder Santa Claus again. His plans are foiled by Jack, but he puts up a fight in the Holiday Trash Hill by turning into a gigantic junk-filled version of himself named "Mega-Oogie." He is again destroyed when his bugs come out of him.

Oogie also appears with other Disney Villains at Halloween events such as the Haunted Mansion Holiday at Disneyland and Tokyo Disneyland, the HalloWishes and Halloween Screams fireworks shows at the Magic Kingdom and Disneyland, respectively, World of Color: Villainous at Disney California Adventure, and during the "Mickey's Not-So-Scary Halloween Party", "Mickey's Halloween Party", and "Oogie Boogie Bash" separate-admission ("hard ticket") events. Oogie Boogie also appears in the video game Kingdom Hearts as an ally of Maleficent. He reappears in Kingdom Hearts: Chain of Memories as an enemy based on Sora's memories of him, and in Kingdom Hearts II, where he attempts to turn Santa Claus into a Heartless.

=== Doctor Finkelstein ===
Evil Scientist
- First appearance: The Nightmare Before Christmas (1993)
- Created by: Tim Burton
- Voiced by: William Hickey (film); Jess Harnell (video games)
- Species: Humanoid

Doctor Finkelstein or Doctor Finklestein, also known as "Evil Scientist" in the credits, is a resident of Halloween Town. He is a mad scientist and the "father" of Sally, who has a duckbill-like mouth and a hinged skullcap that he can open up to reveal his brain. For unknown reasons, he uses a motorized wheelchair. Finkelstein lives in a large observatory with his stolen living rag doll Sally and his hunchbacked assistant Igor. Finkelstein takes full responsibility over Sally and acts as an over-protective father by keeping her imprisoned under the pretext of sheltering her from the world's hidden dangers and not wanting her to discover her original birthplace and family. Although he is strict towards Sally, he is also shown to be kind and helpful towards Jack, as he allows him to borrow some of his equipment to conduct experiments with Christmas objects. He also helps Jack in his plan to take over Christmas by bringing skeletal reindeer to life to pull Jack's sleigh. At the end of the film, Finkelstein, deciding that Sally might be ready to take on the world's dangers after all, lets her go free and creates a wife for himself using a portion of his own brain.

Dr. Finkelstein is featured in The Nightmare Before Christmas: Oogie's Revenge. When Jack is still tired of doing the same thing at Halloween, Finkelstein helps him by giving him the Soul Robber, a weapon that allows Jack to change its shape. Jack also tells Finkelstein to watch over the town while he is away. After Oogie Boogie's revival, he falls under his control by switching his brain to a different one and creates monsters that obey Oogie Boogie. When Jack confronts Finkelstein and learns his brain has been switched, he starts a plan to get rid of it by using the "sleeping soup" Sally gave him, and is able to put his original brain back in place and free him from Oogie's control.

Finkelstein also appears in Kingdom Hearts and other games in the series. When the Heartless appear in Halloween Town, Jack thinks of adding them to the Halloween celebrations and asks Dr. Finkelstein for advice. After realizing the Heartless need a heart, the two find the ingredients for one: pulse, emotion, terror, fear, hope and despair. Their initial experiment fails, and Finkelstein sends Jack off with Sora and the group to retrieve two more ingredients, memory and surprise and complete the heart. However, the heart is stolen by Oogie Boogie. In Kingdom Hearts: Chain of Memories, created from Sora's memories, Finkelstein creates a potion that allows people to see their true memory. However, once he sniffs the potion, Heartless appear. In Kingdom Hearts II, with Lock, Shock, and Barrel's help, Finkelstein creates an experiment. Since the Experiment has no heart, it goes on a rampage to steal gifts in an attempt to understand the emotions behind giving and gain a heart of its own. Sora and the gang are forced to destroy the Experiment. Dr. Finkelstein was voiced by William Hickey in the film and by Jess Harnell in the video game spin-offs. His Japanese voice is provided by Yūji Mitsuya.

=== Mayor of Halloween Town ===
The Mayor of Halloween Town
- First appearance: The Nightmare Before Christmas (1993)
- Created by: Tim Burton
- Voiced by: Glenn Shadix (film, Kingdom Hearts II, Oogie's Revenge); Jeff Bennett (Kingdom Hearts)
- Species: Two-faced humanoid

The Mayor of Halloween Town is depicted as a short, fat man who has the appearance of a giant candy corn with a cone-shaped double-sided head, wearing a tall hat, a black widow necktie, and a ribbon of office that says "Mayor" on it. His head has two faces: one face is peach-colored and has rosy cheeks, a spiral eye, a black eye and a permanent smile. The other face is white-colored and has a permanent frown that has pointed teeth, blue lips and pink eyes. Depending on his mood, his head swivels around to display the right face. When not in use, the other face has closed eyes. He seemingly has little authority in the day-to-day running of the town, nor much confidence in his leadership skills. Despite this, he seems to enjoy his position. His true role seems to be assisting Jack in governing the town and concocting plans for Halloween.

The Mayor of Halloween Town appears in Kingdom Hearts and Kingdom Hearts II but his role is fairly minor. In the first game, he helps Jack and Sora find an ingredient they need for the heart Dr. Finkelstein is making. In the second game, he unsuccessfully tries to stop Heartless outbreaks by yelling at them through his megaphone. In The Nightmare Before Christmas: Oogie's Revenge, the Mayor is seen in the opening cut scene congratulating Jack on another "horrible" Halloween. He is later seen in the level "Mayor's Madhouse" where Jack rescues him from a cage hanging from the roof of his house. While Jack goes to Christmas Town, the Mayor frees the other holiday leaders. He is voiced by Glenn Shadix in the film, Oogie's Revenge and Kingdom Hearts II, and Jeff Bennett in Kingdom Hearts.

=== Lock, Shock and Barrel ===
Lock, Shock, and Barrel
- First appearance: The Nightmare Before Christmas (1993)
- Created by: Tim Burton
- Voiced by: Lock: Paul Reubens (film, Oogie's Revenge); Jess Harnell (Kingdom Hearts, Kingdom Hearts II); Shock: Catherine O'Hara (film); Kath Soucie (Kingdom Hearts, Kingdom Hearts II, Oogie's Revenge); Barrel: Danny Elfman (film); Jeff Bennett (Kingdom Hearts, Kingdom Hearts II); Dee Bradley Baker (Oogie's Revenge)
- Species: Humanoids

Lock, Shock, and Barrel are introduced as Oogie Boogie's "little henchmen", being 6, 7 and 5 years old, respectively. Although they pride in their work for Oogie Boogie and speak of their desire to please him whilst causing mischief, they appear to not harbor any particular loyalties towards him. After his death, the trio help the Mayor bring Jack and Sally out of Oogie Boogie's lair and have fun when it begins to snow in Halloweentown. Presumably due to their lust for trouble, or to provide conflict for Jack, they have shown no protest and even happiness when their master was revived in the spinoffs, and reanimated him themselves in "Oogie's Revenge". They are all trick-or-treaters, with masks similar to their faces. Their names are a play on the phrase "lock, stock, and barrel."

- Lock is the leader of the three, but does not always think through things thoroughly and likes being in charge. Lock wears a red devil costume but has a real devil's tail, and also has sharp and pointy teeth. His face is narrow and angular, and he has red and brown hair formed into two horns. He likes to think highly of himself and gets upset when others insult him or take the lead. However, he goes along with others' ideas if he fails to come up with anything himself.
- Shock is the only female of the three and is the oldest and most cunning and intelligent of them, which, despite her often being tired of them, helps to settle arguments. She wears a purple witch costume with an elongated hat and sometimes carries a broomstick, and has pale-green skin, a long pointed nose, and violet-blue wiry hair. She tends to be rather impatient and dislikes unplanned steps, such as where exactly to take Santa Claws. She often takes the lead in plans and likes being right.
- Barrel is Oogie's "star pupil" and the youngest of the three, who pilots the walking bathtub they use as transport. He is also considered the stupidest, despite his protests to the contrary, and is the butt of many jokes but usually gets even through tricks. He wears a skeleton costume and often carries an orange and black lollipop. He mostly resembles a small human boy, but has white skin, sunken eyes, coiffed green hair, and deformed feet. Additionally, he has a perpetual grin except when he is angry or scared. He is quite innovative, suggesting several ways to execute the capture of Santa Claus. While none of them work, he still attempts to be smart but often fails, he is a foil for Shock. The two often fight over who is smarter before being stopped by Lock.

In The Nightmare Before Christmas: The Pumpkin King, Oogie Boogie sends Lock, Shock, and Barrel out to nab the new "Pumpkin King." They come back with Sally instead, saying she resembled Jack in the dark. Throughout the game, they cause most of the ruckus in town and aid Oogie in the final battle. In The Nightmare Before Christmas: Oogie's Revenge, Lock, Shock, and Barrel decide to revive Oogie Boogie out of boredom after learning Jack is temporarily leaving Halloween Town. In the game, Jack encounters the three one by one. In chapter 15, they try to stop Jack a final time in their mobile bathtub atop the Mayor of Halloween Town's house. He defeats them, yet they spring a trap and drop him into a maze in Oogie's lair. They do not appear again in the game afterwards.

In Kingdom Hearts, after hearing Jack speak of a heart that can control the Heartless, Oogie sends the three to steal the heart as part of his plan to take over Halloween Town. After the three are defeated by Sora, Donald, and Goofy, they confess that Oogie made them do it. In Kingdom Hearts 358/2 Days, the three find a Heartless and keep it as their pet before it becomes too big for them to control. In Kingdom Hearts II, Lock, Shock, and Barrel start off working as Doctor Finkelstein's assistants until they encounter Maleficent, who revives Oogie Boogie and gives them the "Prison Keeper" Heartless to hold off Sora and company. The monster keeps them in a cage underneath its body, but swallows one of them to act as its "pilot", each one giving the monster a different ability and appearance. It ultimately swallows all three of them before attacking Sora and party with its full repertoire. After its defeat, the trio run off.

In the film, Lock was voiced by Paul Reubens, Shock was voiced by Catherine O'Hara, and Barrel was voiced by Danny Elfman. In the Kingdom Hearts series, Lock was voiced by Jess Harnell, Shock was voiced by Kath Soucie, and Barrel was voiced by Jeff Bennett. In The Nightmare Before Christmas: Oogie's Revenge, Paul Reubens reprised the role of Lock, Kath Soucie reprised the role of Shock from Kingdom Hearts, and Dee Bradley Baker voiced Barrel.

=== Santa Claus ===
Santa Claus
- First appearance: The Nightmare Before Christmas (1993)
- Created by: Tim Burton
- Voiced by: Ed Ivory (film); Corey Burton (video games); Patrick Stewart (soundtracks)
- Aliases: Sandy Claws; Mr. Claus
- Species: Joulupukki

Santa Claus, who Jack calls Sandy Claws, is the leader of Christmas Town. After Jack stumbles upon the town, he becomes mesmerized with the holiday and tries to bring Christmas to Halloween Town. To do so, he orders Lock, Shock, and Barrel to kidnap Santa so Jack can take his place for the Christmas season. The three then take Santa to Oogie Boogie, where his life is threatened until Jack and Sally manage to save him and the holiday of Christmas.

In The Nightmare Before Christmas: Oogie's Revenge, Oogie Boogie targets Santa Claus and leaves him hanging over the tracks for his scissor-tipped Oogie Train to drop him, but he is saved by Jack Skellington as Santa remembers him from their last encounter. When Oogie Boogie hijacks Santa's sleigh, Jack lets him use the same sleigh he used when Jack tried to improvise Christmas. Santa Claus appears in Kingdom Hearts II. Sora, Donald Duck, and Goofy meet Santa Claus when they follow Jack Skellington to Christmas Town. Maleficent revives Oogie Boogie and sends him to capture Santa Claus, and after Sora defeats Oogie Boogie, Santa Claus tells Jack he should concentrate on Halloween and Santa should concentrate on Christmas. He also tells Sora to believe he will meet Riku again. Later on, Santa's presents are stolen by Dr. Finkelstein's Experiment, and he helps Jack make decoy presents to attract the Experiment. Jack and company reclaim the presents by hiding in a decoy present, and after they defeat the Experiment, Santa Claus decides to give Jack a taste of what it is like to deliver Christmas presents. After Jack finishes delivering presents, Santa takes back his sleigh and brings forth snow as a present for those in Halloween Town. Santa Claus is voiced by Edward Ivory in the film and by Corey Burton in the video game spin-offs.

=== Zero ===
Zero
- First appearance: The Nightmare Before Christmas (1993)
- Created by: Tim Burton
- Voiced by: Frank Welker
- Species: Ghost Dog

Zero is Jack's ghost dog, who floats about and follows him. His nose, which is in the shape of a glowing orange jack-o-lantern, also doubles as a bright light. In the Kingdom Hearts series, Zero is often called upon to search for someone. In The Nightmare Before Christmas: Oogie's Revenge, he will disappear and reappear depending on whether the player has completed the Halloween Town story.

== Minor ==
=== Halloween Town residents ===
- The Bats are seen all over throughout Halloween Town, most notably before Oogie Boogie's shadow on the moon, and hanging on the Christmas Tree in the real world.
- Black cat is a minor animal from Halloween Town, who appears during "This Is Halloween" and "Sally's Song". It is possible they might be Sally's pet.
- Behemoth (voiced by Randy Crenshaw) is a tall and large zombie-like man who wears blue overalls and yellow gloves and has an axe stuck in his head. Despite seemingly being dumb, he is also strong. In the film, he shouts at the Easter Bunny, causing him to jump back into the bag. In The Nightmare Before Christmas: Oogie's Revenge, it is shown that Behemoth likes to grow pumpkins, as mentioned by Mr. Hyde when Behemoth catches him near his pumpkins.
- The Clown With The Tear-Away Face (voiced by Danny Elfman in the film, Dee Bradley Baker in the video game spin-off) is a fat evil clown who rides a unicycle and can tear off his face to reveal complete darkness and disappear into smoke. The Clown also appears in Tim Burton's The Nightmare Before Christmas: Oogie's Revenge, where Jack finds him in the sewers upon his return. The Clown then unlocks the gate so Jack can proceed to the graveyard. In the residential areas of Halloween Town, the Clown's unicycle goes out of control, causing Jack to use one of Dr. Finkelstein's inventions to stop the unicycle.
- Corpse Family are a family of zombies consisting of the big-nosed and balding Corpse Dad (voiced by Kerry Katz), the heavyset Corpse Mom (voiced by Debi Durst), and the sewn-eyed Corpse Kid (voiced by Debi Durst) According to The Nightmare Before Christmas Trading Card Game, Corpse Dad is named "Ned", Corpse Mom is named "Bertha", and Corpse Kid is named "Ethan". Corpse Kid also appears in Tim Burton's The Nightmare Before Christmas: Oogie's Revenge, where he asks questions to Jack.
- Creature Under the Bed (voiced by Carmen Twilie) is a monster with sharp teeth and glowing red eyes. He is only seen in the film during "This Is Halloween", where he states "I am the one hiding under your bed, Teeth ground sharp and eyes glowing red!"
- Creature Under the Stairs (voiced by Kerry Katz) is a brownish-grey monster with a worm-like head, black and white stripes on his neck, fingers resembling snakes, and spider-like hair as he also identifies himself during the "This is Halloween" song as "The One Hiding Under the Stairs". In addition, the Creature Under the Stairs has a four-wheeled platform in place of legs.
- Cyclops is a thin, black, pointy-eared monster with one eye. His voice actor was never credited.
- Devil (voiced by Greg Proops) is a red devil with horns and a beard.
- Frankenstein is seen in the background Halloween Town during the ending of "This Is Halloween" clapping in the crowd in Town Square.
- Gate Keeper is the keeper of the Halloween Town Gate. He is a short monster with a bird-like face who wears a yellow trench coat and a yellow bowler hat.
- Ghosts are a quintet of ghosts who provide a chorus during musical numbers. According to The Nightmare Before Christmas Trading Card Game, their names are Alberto (a Bass), Pietro (a Baritone), Luciano (a Tenor), Sophia (an Alto), and Maria (a Soprano).
- The Grim Reaper was seen in "This Is Halloween" and at the town meeting. His face is not shown and he carries a scythe.
  - Grim Reaper's Companion is an unnamed old woman who sits beside the Reaper during the town meeting. She has pale skin, dark green eyes, dark yellow hair, and wears a black hood.
- Hanging Tree (voiced by an uncredited Thurl Ravenscroft in the film, Dee Bradley Baker in the video game spin-off) is a spirited tree. The Hanging Tree also appears in The Nightmare Before Christmas: Oogie's Revenge, where Jack helps him find his skeletons after they are separated from him.
  - The Hanging Skeletons are a bunch of skeletons hanging from the Hanging Tree's branches. They have one line in "This Is Halloween".
- Harlequin Demon (voiced by Greg Proops) is a monster with three moving fronds, sharp teeth, and a large mouth. During the Town Meeting, he has the thought of pox in the box. He later attempts to make a hat out of a dead rat during the song "Making Christmas". Despite this, Jack voices his opinion and tells the Harlequin Demon to convert a dead bat into a hat instead.
- Igor (voiced by an uncredited Joe Ranft in the film, Rob Paulsen in the video game sequel) is Dr. Finkelstein's assistant, who enjoys dog bone treats. He is seen at the town meeting and is later seen giving Finkelstein the plans for the skeleton reindeer. In The Nightmare Before Christmas: Oogie's Revenge, Igor tells Jack Skellington of Finkelstein's strange behavior, and Jack later helps Igor when his bone biscuit treats are stolen.
- The Jack-o'-lantern are scattered throughout Halloween Town. One jack-o'-lantern is seen at the town meeting.
- Jewel Finkelstein is a monster created by Dr. Finkelstein to replace Sally as his servant and is thought to be his wife. Throughout the film, he is seen creating her and she is seen at the end pushing his wheelchair as the Halloween Town residents are enjoying the snow.
- Melting Man is a slimy man who is always melting and wears a suit. In The Nightmare Before Christmas: The Pumpkin King, he is attacked by Oogie during the invitation and torn to pieces. His pieces are used as heads for headless horsemen, while his eyeball is left behind. Jack attacks and defeats the horsemen before gathering the pieces thinking they are food. When the pieces are put in the pot, the Melting Man reassembles himself.
- Mr. Hyde (voiced by Randy Crenshaw) is a man with smaller versions of himself in his top hat. They also appear in The Nightmare Before Christmas: Oogie's Revenge, where they travel with Jack and serve as the Save Points of the game and give facts about the area they are in.
- Mummy Boy (voiced by Sherwood Ball) is a mummy child with a visible yellow eyeball. He is seen in the company of the Corpse Kid or the Withered Winged Demon, and on top of the Mayor's car helping him.
- The Rats can be seen running around Halloween Town. One rat is seen with a Christmas present and a party hat as Santa Claus is brought into Halloween Town by Lock, Shock, and Barrel.
- The Shadows are an assortment of shadows, consisting of a ghostly demon shadow, a werewolf shadow, and a female two-headed twin shadow who introduce the song "This Is Halloween". The demon and wolf shadows have the same voice.
- The Skeletal Reindeer were created by Doctor Finkelstein to act as the reindeer that pull Jack's sleigh. In The Nightmare Before Christmas: Oogie's Revenge, the Skeletal Reindeer are rebuilt when the sleigh arrives for Santa Claus to use after Oogie Boogie hijacks his sleigh.
- Skeletal Rooster - A Skeletal Rooster is seen crowing at the crack of dawn before the musical number "Jack's Obsession".
- The Undersea Gal (voiced by Carmen Twillie) is a cross between a gill-man and a mermaid.
- The Vampire Brothers are four vampires who use umbrellas to move around during the day. Their names come from The Nightmare Before Christmas Trading Card Game. The Vampire Brothers worked on the Evil Toy Duck during the "Making Christmas" number. In The Nightmare Before Christmas: The Pumpkin King, the Vampire Brothers are among the Halloween Town citizens driven out of town by the bug army. One of them is put into a trance by Lock, Shock, and Barrel, but is restored to normal after its death. The Vampire Brothers also appear in The Nightmare Before Christmas: Oogie's Revenge, where Jack has to find their bat forms and return them to their coffins to change them back. After this, the Vampire Brothers give Jack the pieces of the key to the Mayor of Halloween Town's house.
  - The Vampire Prince (voiced by Sherwood Ball) is a tall vampire who is the leader of the Vampire Brothers. When Jack was missing, the Vampire Prince stated that he checked behind the Cyclops' eye and he wasn't there.
  - The Vampire Baron (voiced by Kerry Katz) is a short portly vampire.
  - The Vampire Count (voiced by Randy Crenshaw) is a wide and bald-headed vampire.
  - The Vampire Lord (voiced by Jess Harnell in the video game) is a tall slim vampire.
- The Witches consist of a tall witch (voiced by Susan McBride in the film, Susanne Blakeslee in the video game) and a short witch (voiced by Debi Durst) who sing in the song, "This Is Halloween". While their names are not given in the film, the Nightmare Before Christmas trading card game gives them the names "Helgamine" (the tall witch) and "Zeldaborne" (the short witch). They also appear in The Nightmare Before Christmas: Oogie's Revenge, where they have a shop near the town hall.
- Withered Winged Demon (voiced by Susan McBride) is a small demon with large wings that he uses to walk. He is often seen in the company of the Corpse Kid and the Mummy Boy.
- Werewolf (voiced by Glenn Walters) is a werewolf who lives in Halloween Town. In "Making Christmas", he is seen working with the Corpse Dad and the Devil on the Vampire Teddy.
- Who's There - A being who states in "This Is Halloween", "I am the "who" when you call, "Who's there?"".
- Zombie Band - A zombie band that consists of an Accordion player (voiced by Kerry Katz who was uncredited for the role), a bass player, and a saxophone player (voiced by Greg Proops) who perform on the streets. According to The Nightmare Before Christmas Trading Card Game, the Accordion player is named Jimmy, the bass player is named Jim, and the sax player is named James. Jim's bass contains a speaking severed head (voiced by an uncredited actor) who resembles Danny Elfman.

=== Halloween Town-based Toys ===
The following toys were created by the citizens of Halloween Town:

- Giant Snake is a large ravenous orange python with black stripes and a large mouth.
- Jack-in-the-boxes are a pumpkin-headed jack-in-the-box and a black cat jack-in-the-box who both have a clown face on the front of their boxes.
- Man-Eating Wreath - One of the Christmas gifts, who Jack gives to an old lady. It can extend vines from underneath itself.
- Vampire Teddy (voiced by Dee Bradley Baker) - A vampire-like teddy bear created by Werewolf, Corpse Dad, and the Devil. In The Nightmare Before Christmas: Oogie's Revenge, the Scary Teddy appears as a common enemy called Trick alongside another enemy named Treat.
- Shrunken head is a shrunken head that Jack Skellington gave to a boy, causing the boy's parents to scream and faint upon seeing it. It is one of the only gifts that is not alive. Santa Claus later returns and replaces the shrunken head with a puppy.
- Evil Toy Duck (voiced by Greg Proops) - A yellow toy duck with sharp teeth and wheels.
- Evil Toy Train is a monstrous toy train that was briefly held by Mummy Boy, presumed to have created it. It is unknown whether it is alive or not, and who Jack gave this toy to.
- Stacking Dolls are three stacking dolls created by Mr. Hyde.

=== Christmas Town residents ===
- Christmas Elves are Santa Claus's helpers who are responsible for preparing gifts and decorations for Christmas.
  - The Green Elf (voiced by Debi Durst) is a Christmas elf in green clothes that Jack Skellington interacts with in The Nightmare Before Christmas: Oogie's Revenge.
  - The Red Elf (voiced by Dee Bradley Baker) is a Christmas elf in red clothes that Jack Skellington interacts with in The Nightmare Before Christmas: Oogie's Revenge.
- Mrs. Claus is Santa Claus's wife, who is seen in the background as he checks the naughty-nice list.
- The Penguins are seen through Christmas Town.
- Santa Claus's reindeer fly with magic and pull his sleigh.

=== Video game enemies ===
- Colossal Moth is a huge moth that attacks with acidic saliva and poisonous fumes. It is featured in The Nightmare Before Christmas: The Pumpkin King.
- Giant Snake is an artificial bug-filled snake who is a boss in The Nightmare Before Christmas: The Pumpkin King.
- Halloween Ghosts appear in The Nightmare Before Christmas: Oogie's Revenge, having been created by Dr. Finkelstein around the time Oogie Boogie tricked citizens of Halloween Town.
  - King Ghosts are stronger than the Halloween Ghosts, and require the same tactics to be defeated.
- Mega Spider is a spider-like enemy who appear in The Nightmare Before Christmas: Oogie's Revenge. A Mega Spider appears in The Nightmare Before Christmas: The Pumpkin King as the mutated pet of Lock, Shock, and Barrel.
- Mother Locust is a locust with an abdomen filled with swollen eggs who is a boss in The Nightmare Before Christmas: The Pumpkin King.
- Oogie Cycle is a colossal beetle that serves as Oogie's ride and the final boss in The Nightmare Before Christmas: The Pumpkin King. It acts as a motorcycle-like mode of transportation for Oogie, Lock, Shock, and Barrel.
- Oogie Train is a scissor-tipped train who is a boss in The Nightmare Before Christmas: Oogie's Revenge.
- Enormous Rolly Polly is a large but weak pillbug who is a boss in The Nightmare Before Christmas: The Pumpkin King.
  - Rolly Polly is a large offspring of Enormous Rolly Polly, featured in The Nightmare Before Christmas: The Pumpkin King.
- Skeletons - In The Nightmare Before Christmas: Oogie's Revenge, Oogie Boogie had several skeletons that served him, which were brought to life by Dr. Finkelstein around the time Oogie Boogie tricked the citizens of Halloween Town. They resemble the Skeletons in Oogie Boogie's lair.
  - Blue Skeletons are the easiest to defeat. They are slow and have short reach unless they are mad and spinning.
  - Heat Skeletons have short reach but can throw boomerangs.
  - Orc Skeletons - They are like the Blue Skeletons, but the mad ones wield clubs. Like the Blue Skeletons, they are slow and have short reach unless they are mad and spinning.
  - Troll Skeletons are big with one eye socket and wield large clubs. They can only be grabbed when the Soul Robber is Level 3. If they drop their clubs, Jack can use the Soul Robber to throw the clubs at them.
  - King Skeletons are also big and wield big axes. The attack on the King Skeletons are the same as Troll Skeletons, with two exceptions. Unlikie them, they cannot be grabbed, only turned around. They can be only hit while they are growling or from behind.
    - Fire and Ice King Skeletons are two bosses from The Nightmare Before Christmas: Oogie's Revenge. Fought in "Fire and Ice Frenzy", they appear to fight Jack after he replaces the Oogie-Doors with the real Holiday Doors. He uses the Santa Jack costume to fight the Fire King Skeleton and the Pumpkin King costume to fight the Ice King Skeleton.
- Zombie Centipede is a huge centipede with wings that was brought back from the dead by Oogie, and is featured in The Nightmare Before Christmas: The Pumpkin King.

== Marketing ==
The owners of the franchise have undertaken an extensive marketing campaign of these characters across many media. In addition to the "Haunted Mansion Holiday at Disneyland" featuring "Tim Burton's The Nightmare Before Christmas characters," Jack Skellington, Sally, Pajama Jack, and the mayor have been made into Bendies figures, while Jack and Sally even appear in fine art. Moreover, Sally has been made into an action figure and a Halloween costume. The Mayor has been made into a Bendies figure. Jack is also the titular character in the short story "Tim Burton's The Nightmare Before Christmas: Jack's story." Jim Edwards actually contends that "Tim Burton's animated movie The Nightmare Before Christmas is really a movie about the marketing business. The movie's lead character, Jack Skellington, the chief marketing officer (CMO) for a successful company decides that his success is boring and he wants the company to have a different business plan. Some have wondered which real-life company failure the movie is based on: Sergio Zyman's New Coke or Merck's launch and subsequent withdrawal of Vioxx."

== Reception ==
While Yvonne Tasker notes "the complex characterization seen in The Nightmare Before Christmas," Michael A. Morrison discusses the influence of Dr. Seuss's How the Grinch Stole Christmas on the film, writing that Jack parallels the Grinch and Zero parallels Max, the Grinch's dog. Philip Nel writes that the film "challenges the wisdom of adults through its trickster characters" contrasting Jack as a "good trickster" with Oogie Boogie, whom he also compares with Dr. Seuss's Dr. Terwilliker, as a bad trickster. Richard Delgado and Jean Stefancic see the characters as presented in a more negative light and criticise the film's characters as having racial constructs, with the protagonists using "whitespeak" and the antagonist, Oogie Boogie, using "blackspeak." This perception was not entirely unanticipated by the filmmakers. Danny Elfman was worried the characterization of Oogie Boogie would be condemned as racist by the National Association for the Advancement of Colored People (NAACP). As Delgado and Stefancic's book reveals, Elfman's predictions became true. Nevertheless, director Henry Selick stated the character was inspired from the Betty Boop cartoon The Old Man of the Mountain. "Cab Calloway would dance his inimitable jazz dance and sing "Minnie the Moocher" or "Old Man of the Mountain", and they would rotoscope him, trace him, turn him into a cartoon character, often transforming him into an animal, like a walrus," Selick continued. "I think those are some of the most inventive moments in cartoon history, in no way racist, even though he was sometimes a villain. We went with Ken Page, who is a black singer and he had no problem with it".
