= Jack Skellington =

Character in The Nightmare Before Christmas

- The Nightmare Before Christmas character
- Jack Skellington as he appears in the Kingdom Hearts series
- First appearance: The Nightmare Before Christmas (1993)
- Created by: Tim Burton; Henry Selick
- Voiced by: Danny Elfman (singing voice); Chris Sarandon (speaking voice)

In-universe information
- Alias: Skeleton Jack; The Pumpkin King
- Species: Skeleton
- Gender: Male
- Significant others: Sally
- Origin: Halloween Town

Jack Skellington is the main protagonist of the 1993 film The Nightmare Before Christmas. He is a skeleton who is the Pumpkin King of Halloween Town, a fantasy world based solely on the eponymous holiday. Danny Elfman provided Jack's singing voice in the original film and soundtrack album, with Chris Sarandon providing Jack's speaking voice.

His overall appearance is a skeleton dressed in a black pin-striped suit and a bow tie that strongly resembles a bat. Originally, his suit was meant to be completely black, but it blended with the background too well, so it was changed. At the beginning of the film, Jack makes his grand entrance by emerging out of the fountain in Halloween Town's plaza. His last name is a play on the word "skeleton". He has a ghost dog named Zero for a pet, who has a small jack-o'-lantern for a nose. He is adored by Sally, a feminine creation of Doctor Finkelstein. Outside of the film, Jack has appeared in video games such as the Kingdom Hearts series. Various merchandise has also been produced based on the character.

== In The Nightmare Before Christmas ==
Jack Skellington is the undead patron spirit of Halloween, portrayed as being on par with Santa Claus and the Easter Bunny within his own holiday. As a living skeleton, he is supernatural and can remove parts of his body without harm, as is often demonstrated for comic relief. He is the most important of many Halloween spirits, with the implication that their job is to scare people in the real world on Halloween night.

Jack, as the "Pumpkin King" and master of ceremonies, is in charge of Halloween Town's Halloween celebration. He is loved, respected, and even idolized by the other residents for his role, but he has grown weary of celebrating the same holiday endlessly and is depressed about it. The only one who understands Jack's feelings is a lonely ragdoll named Sally. She overhears his singing monologue and feels she can relate to his situation.

One morning after the usual annual celebration, Jack enters a forest containing portals to other worlds themed around holidays. He discovers Christmas Town and decides that this new experience is what his life was missing. He makes preparations for his own Christmas celebration in Halloween Town and wants to impersonate Santa Claus in the real world. While his intentions are not malicious, Jack does not understand the true spirit of Christmas. Halloween Town plans to give the holiday a macabre makeover. Sally reveals to Jack a bad premonition, but Jack's basic nature is impulsiveness. He does not seem to register contradictory information. By the end of the film, he notices Sally and her determination to help him. He proves that love can be a part of his nature by calling Sally his "Dearest Friend", telling Sally that they were meant to be together, embracing his future with her and embracing her.

Jack follows the formula of a tragic hero because he begins the story at a lofty position. In spite of all his fame and talent, he yearns for another side of life. While a desire for completeness is not a flaw, his impulsiveness proves to be. He tends to be enthusiastic and inclusive, and his charisma is enough to sway every member of Halloween Town except Sally. His selfish decisions lead to the near destruction of Christmas and himself. The strength of Jack's character is demonstrated by his will to correct his own mistakes.

The official film soundtrack CD contains an epilogue not in the film, stating that "many years later", Santa returned to Halloween Town to visit Jack, where he discovered that Jack had "four or five skeleton children at hand" who play together in a xylophone band.

== In video games ==
=== The Nightmare Before Christmas: The Pumpkin King ===
Jack Skellington has been shown to have an extreme hatred for Oogie Boogie as was proven when he spoke of this plan to Lock, Shock, and Barrel, stating to "leave that no account Oogie Boogie out of this!" He later finds out that Santa Claus and Sally have been kidnapped by the Boogie Man and are in his underground lair. While trying to save his friends, Jack manages to destroy Oogie and save Christmas.

=== The Nightmare Before Christmas: Oogie's Revenge ===
Tired of using the same old themes over and over on Halloween, Jack Skellington goes to Doctor Finkelstein, who gives him the Soul Robber, a slimy green creature that changes shape. Jack decided to leave Halloween Town to get new ideas for Halloween frights. When Jack comes back to town, he finds that Oogie Boogie has been resurrected. Now Jack has to set things right again.

Chris Sarandon did both the speaking and singing voice for Jack in this game.

=== Disney Universe ===
Jack Skellington features in the Nightmare Before Christmas downloadable expansion pack which includes Jack Skellington, Sally, Oogie-Boogie, Dr. Finkelstein, and the Mayor as in-game playable costumes. The downloadable content can be bought from console stores (e.g. the PlayStation Store). The package included the costumes of which some could be found in the downloaded level.

=== Kingdom Hearts series ===
Jack Skellington appears in four installments of the Kingdom Hearts video game series. He inhabits the world of Halloween Town, where the Heartless threatens its denizens. The games' protagonists, Sora, Donald Duck and Goofy, befriend Jack and together they battle the Heartless, and also Oogie Boogie.

Chris Sarandon reprises his role for the English version, and Masachika Ichimura provides Jack's Japanese voice.

==== Kingdom Hearts ====
Jack Skellington introduces himself to Sora, Goofy, and Donald Duck as the ruler of Halloween Town. Jack plans to use the heart that Finkelstein created to control the seemingly docile Heartless to make a festival called "Heartless Halloween" so that Halloween can be frightening, but the idea fails when not only the first experiment cause the Heartless to go berserk, but Oogie Boogie steals the finished heart, and plans to use it to take over Halloween Town. At Oogie's manor, Jack, Sora, and the gang confront him. After Oogie is defeated, Jack finds out that Oogie uses dark orbs as his source of life, which Oogie combines himself with his manor to become a giant boss. Once the gang defeats Oogie once again, his manor crumbles, revealing Halloween Town's keyhole.

==== Chain of Memories ====
Jack Skellington appears in Kingdom Hearts: Chain of Memories as part of a world created from Sora's memories of Halloween Town. When Jack Skellington wanted to ask Doctor Finkelstein what happened when he sniffs the potion that can bring "true memories", Heartless appeared. When Jack had found out that Oogie Boogie had stolen Doc's potion, he must stop him before Oogie drinks the whole potion. They fail to reach him before he does, but they defeat him, as Oogie becomes overwhelmed with fear as a side effect of the potion. Sora becomes worried about what will happen when he discovers his true memories, but Jack reassures him that fear is a sign of a strong heart.

==== Kingdom Hearts 358/2 Days ====
In 358/2 Days, Roxas arrives at Halloween Town while Jack is in the middle of brainstorming for Halloween. Jack is having trouble with thinking of things but gets inspiration when he sees Roxas leaving through a Dark Corridor. Roxas' adventures through Halloween Town inspire Jack to create such things as balloons filled with spiders, exploding frost pumpkins, and Halloween lanterns. When Roxas is sent to find the source of a drop in the Heartless population, he finds the town overrun with monsters called Tentaclaws. After seeing Roxas defeating the source of the Tentaclaws, the cannibalistic Leechgrave, Jack creates a scarecrow based on Roxas as his centerpiece for Halloween.

==== Kingdom Hearts II ====
Following the film loosely to some degree, out of reference, Jack tries to take Santa Claus's place again. To that end, Jack asks Sora and the gang to help him be Santa's bodyguards. But after fighting the Heartless and Oogie Boogie, who has been resurrected by Maleficent, Santa explains to Jack that they each have a job to do with their respective holidays. Despite this, he begins to wear a Santa suit Sally sewed together for him. In the second trip to Halloween Town, Jack still wears the Santa suit, as he still longs to deliver Christmas presents and feels that it would be rude not to wear the suit Sally worked so hard on. Along with Sora and the gang, he helps defeat Doctor Finkelstein's experiment, who stole Christmas presents from Santa in search of a heart. As a reward for all his hard work and assistance, Santa brings Jack on a ride-along with him in his sleigh for a while. After Santa drops Jack off at Halloween Town, Jack learns the true meaning of Christmas by understanding the act of giving. He dances with Sally in the end, finally realizing all of the gifts she had given to him were all from the heart and wishes to give her something in return. She tells him that the nicest present she could ever ask for is just to be with Jack. Jack responds telling her that she does not even have to ask for that, meaning Jack feels the same way for her. During a cut scene in the end credits, he is shown to be wearing his original suit, suggesting he has taken Santa's previous advice to heart completely, and apparently begins presenting new ideas for next Halloween.

=== Disney Infinity ===
In the Disney Infinity video game series, Jack appears as part of the second wave of playable characters. He has the ability to scare enemies and throw exploding jack-o'-lanterns. If he rides Ghost Rider's motorcycle, his head will catch on fire, resembling Ghost Rider's flaming head.

=== Disney Magic Kingdoms ===
In the world builder game Disney Magic Kingdoms, Jack appears as a playable character to unlock for a limited time.

=== Disney Mirrorverse ===
An alternate version of Jack Skellington appears as a playable character in the video game Disney Mirrorverse.

=== Disney Dreamlight Valley ===
Jack Skellington was added as a villager to Disney Dreamlight Valley as part of a free update in December 2023, again voiced by Chris Sarandon.

=== Fortnite: Battle Royale ===
On October 24, 2023, Jack Skellington was added to Fortnite Battle Royale as an Item Shop outfit for Fortnitemares 2023 alongside two other crossover outfits, Alan Wake and Michael Myers from Halloween, to celebrate The Nightmare Before Christmas's 30th anniversary. He has a signature emote, Jack's Scary Face, as well as his own bundle, including the Zero Back Bling, Peppermint Parasol Pickaxe, and Jack's Sled Glider. On November 3, 2023, Jack Skellington was disabled in the "Save the World" mode in Fortnite due to an issue.

=== Disney's Twisted Wonderland ===
In the mobile game Twisted Wonderland, Jack Skellington himself appears during a Halloween event, in which several of the Night Raven College students are transported to Halloweentown. Jack recruits them to help with preparations for the holiday.

A character exclusive to the event, Skully J. Graves, is the Twisted Wonderland incarnation of Jack, sharing his love for the holiday and Jack's sense of impulsivity. Skully idolizes Jack and assists in the Halloween preparations, though his emotions get the better of him when Jack proposes ideas for Halloween that contrast with his own, as Skully has his own vision of how Halloween should be. A graduate of Night Raven College, Skully is remembered by the school as the "King of Halloween."

== Attractions ==
Jack appears as a meetable character at several Walt Disney Parks and Resorts including Disneyland, Hong Kong Disneyland, Disneyland Paris and Walt Disney World, and is located outside The Haunted Mansion in Frontierland. During the Halloween and Christmas seasons, the Disneyland and Tokyo Disneyland versions of the Haunted Mansion are taken over by the cast of The Nightmare Before Christmas and are turned into Haunted Mansion Holiday. Jack and other characters appear throughout the ride wearing Christmas attire. Additionally, Jack hosts the Halloween Screams and Not So Spooky Spectacular! fireworks shows, as well as the Frightfully Fun Parade. Chris Sarandon reprised the voice for the character in each instance.

== Merchandise ==
Jack Skellington has been made into a Bendies figure, as well as various Funko Pop Vinyl figurines with different variants, such as a Day of the Dead variant. He appeared in the Kingdom Hearts action figure collections, and was also released in Japan's REVOLTECH Sci-fi line in 2010, along with the Japanese monsters, Gamera and Gyaos. Diamond Select Toys also made many action figures of Jack and other characters.

In 2017 a life-size Jack Skellington animatronic prop was released. The prop was six feet tall and sold exclusively at Spirit Halloween. But in 2019 the prop became a wholesale item.

In 2019, a Lego minifigure of Jack Skellington was released as part of the Lego Minifigures Disney Series 2. A Lego Brickheadz figure of Jack was also released alongside a Brickheadz version of Sally.

Various figures were released for the 30th anniversary, with NECA producing a Jack Skellington figurine and Mattel releasing a Jack Skellington and Sally two-pack in their Monster High Skullector line.

== Reception ==
Despite the film not being a part of the Disney Animated Canon, Jack has nonetheless become one of Disney's most popular characters. Jamie Frater adds, "Jack is perfectly realized as the 'town hero' who seeks more in his life (or death, as it may be), a place we all find ourselves time to time." UGO Networks listed Jack as one of their best heroes of all time.
