= 1990 in comics =

Notable events of 1990 in comics.

== Events ==
=== Year overall ===
- New Century Comics, Disney Comics, Millennium Publications, MU Press, Tundra Publishing, Valiant Comics, Drawn & Quarterly, and the French publisher L'Association, all enter the marketplace.
- The "Days of Future Present" storyline, the sequel to "Days of Future Past," appears in the annuals of Fantastic Four, New Mutants, X-Factor and X-Men.
- Time Inc. and Warner Communications, parent of DC Comics, merge under the name Time Warner.

=== January ===
- January 7: In the Disney comics magazine Topolino, the first chapter of The Search for the Zodiac Stone!: An Epic Yarn of Mice and Ducks!, written by Bruno Sarda and drawn by Massimo De Vita and Franco Valussi, appears in print for the first time. The story, in 12 chapters, is considered the longest Disney comic ever published and its issue lasts the whole year. It involves all the principal characters of the Donald and Mckey universes and sees the debut of Paperinik's nemesis Spectrus.
- January 19: in Spriou, first episode of Spirou à Moscou, by Tome and Janry.
- January 21: in Topolino, the first of the Racconti intorno al fuoco (Tales around the campfire), by Rodolfo Cimino and Giorgio Cavzrzano, is published; they are romantic tales, set in the Nineteenth-century America, told by Grandma Duck but unrelated to the duck universe.
- Baby Blues debuts.
- Charles M. Schulz is named Commandeur des Arts et Lettres.
- Dinosaurs for Hire is cancelled by Eternity Comics with issue #9.
- 1st known artwork by Dale Keown for Marvel Comics, published in Nth Man #9.
- First album of The Men in black series, by Lowell Cunningham and Sandy Carruthers (Aircel comics).

=== February ===
- Fenbruary 11: in Topolino, Ho sposato una strega by Massimo Marconi and Giorgio Cavazzano, parody of Bewitched: Mickey Mouse falls in love for the witch Samantha and imagines marrying her. A cartoon with the two newlyweds together in a bedroom scandalize the most traditionalist readers, and the story is never reprinted.
- The last issue of Damage Control vol. 2 is published.
- With issue #6, Police Academy is cancelled.
- In Uncle Scrooge adventures, The Pied Piper of Duckburg; the story, begun by Carl Barks and left unfinished, was completed by Don Rosa.

=== March ===
- March 16: Jan Bucquoy launches the Belgian weekly magazine Dol/Belge, which is so outrageous in slandering media celebrities, the Belgian royal family, the Pope, politicians and other high officials that within a few weeks issues are confiscated and stores refuse to sell copies. Bucquoy then transforms it into a genuine comics magazine featuring reprints of his older porn parodies. The magazine will last merely a year.
- Elektra Lives Again is published by Epic Comics, written and drawn by Frank Miller.
- The last issue of Strikeforce: Morituri: Electric Undertow is published, thereby ending the series as a whole.
- Le raid infernal, by Jean Michel Charlier and Colin Wilson, sixth chapter of La jeunesse de Blueberry; first chapter of the Great Locomotive Chase saga.

=== April ===
- April 6: The unfinished Blake and Mortimer story, The 3 Formulas of Professor Sato: Mortimer vs. Mortimer, made before Edgar P. Jacobs' death, is published posthumously, completed by Bob de Moor.
- First issue of Mickey Mouse adventures (Disney comics).
- First issue of Peter Bagge Hate (Fantagraphics).
- In Italy, first issue of the antoligcal magazine Bhang (Max Bunker press).

=== May ===
- Colere apache by Festin and Franz; 26th album of the Jerry Spring series (Alpen publishers).

=== June ===
- With issue 9, The Destroyer v1 is cancelled.
- In a supplement to the Italian magazine L'Eternauta, Le sconvolgenti origini del Rat-Man, (The Rat-Man's shocking origins) by Leo Ortolani, the first adventure of the parodic super-hero.

=== July ===
- Fright Night is canceled by Now Comics with issue #22.
- The New Warriors v1 #1 is released.
- 2000AD spin-off Revolver hits newsagents, with the seminal storyline Rogan Gosh.
- Shade the Changing Man is revamped by DC imprint Vertigo.
- Suor Dentona e altre battaglie by Filippo Scozzari (Primo Carnera editore)

=== August ===
- August 31: Scott McCloud draws the first comic strip drawn in 24 hours. In 2004 this will become an annual event.
- Yoshito Usui launches his series Crayon Shin-chan.
- Animal Man #26: "Deus Ex Machina," writer Grant Morrison's final issue of Animal Man.
- Secret Origins is canceled by DC with issue #50.
- Spider-Man #1, the start of the "Torment" storyline, marked Todd McFarlane's first major outing on a series as a writer/artist. The issue would become the best selling comic book so far and be the first major step to the rise of the superstar creators and the formation of Image Comics.

=== September ===
- Nth Man: The Ultimate Ninja is canceled by Marvel with issue #16.
- Terminator is canceled by NOW Comics with issue #17.
- The Thanos quest by Jim Starlin and Ron Lim (Marvel comics)
- First chapter of Hard-boiled by Frank Miller and Geof Darrow (Dark Horse).

=== October ===
- October 12: Las issue of the weekly magazine Il monello (Editoriale Universo); it was in the Italian newsstand since 1933.
- October 13: During the Stripdagen in Breda, the Netherlands, Henk Kuijpers receives the Stripschapprijs. Joost Swarte receives the Jaarprijs voor Bijzondere Verdienste (nowadays the P. Hans Frankfurtherprijs).
- Swamp Thing #100: Double-sized issue, "Tales of Eden," by Doug Wheeler, Kelley Jones, and Pat Broderick.
- The Huntress v1 is canceled by DC with issue #19.
- Bride of the demon by Mike W. Barr and Tom Grindberg (DC Comics)
- The living weapons by Pierre Christin and Jean-Claude Mézières (Dargaud).
- La nuit du 3 aout by William Vance and Jean Van Hamme (XIII series ; Dargaud)
- Ultima fermata l'incubo (Last stop the nightmare) by Alfredo Castelli, Tiziano Sclavi and Giovanni Freghieri (Bonelli); first team-up between two Bonelli heroes (Dylan Dog and Martin Mystere).

=== November ===
- November 12: in Anders And & Co. The master landscapist by Don Rosa.
- Lobo: The Last Czarnian by Keith Giffen and Alan Grant (DC Comics)
- Marvel's "X-Tinction Agenda" crossover begins in the pages of Uncanny X-Men, X-Factor, and New Mutants.
- L'heritier by Jean Van Hamme and Philippe Francq (Largo Winch series ; Duouis)
- Arizona love by Jean-Michel Charlier and Jean Giraud ; last album of the Bllueberry series wiritten by Charlier (Alpen Publishers)
- Louve by Jean Van Hamme and Grzegorz Rosiński (Thorgal series ; Le Lombard)

=== December ===
- Fantastic Four #347 – A temporary lineup introduced, consisting of the Hulk, Spider-Man, Wolverine, and Ghost Rider.
- Wendy the Good Little Witch (1960 series), with issue #97, canceled by Harvey Comics.
- The Real Ghostbusters is canceled by Now Comics with issue #28.
- The books of magics by Neil Gaiman (DC comics)
- First issue of Cages by Dave McKean (Tundra publishing)

=== Specific date unknown ===
- The first issue of the Belgian satirical comics and cartoons magazine Ubu-Pan is published.
- In the Spanish magazine Krazy comics, the dystopic series Brian the brain, by Miguel Angel Martin, makes its debut.

== Deaths ==
=== January ===
- January 1: Charles Boost, Dutch illustrator and comics artist (drew comics for De Tijd), dies at age 82.
- January 7: Tom, A.K.A. Thomaz de Mello, Portuguese painter and comics artist (Rico, Pico e Sarapico), dies at age 83.
- January 8: Bernard Krigstein, American comics artist (Master Race, Mad), dies at age 71.
- January 14: Bohumil Konecny, aka Bimba, Czech comics artist, painter and illustrator (Amazona, aka Octobriana), dies at age 71.
- January 20: Claude Auclair, French comics artist (Simon du Fleuve), dies at age 46.

=== February ===
- February 22: Thomas Ochse Honiball, South African cartoonist and comics artist (Oom Kaspaas, Jakkals en Wolf), dies at age 84.

=== March ===
- March 4: Salvatore Deidda, Italian comics artist (Stark, continued Martin Mystère), dies at age 37.
- March 12: Woody Kimbrell, American comics artist (Little Lulu), dies at age 83.
- March 24: Ray Goulding, American comedian (Bob & Ray) and comics writer (Mad Magazine), dies at age 68.
- March 30: João Mottini, Brazilian comics artist (Quintín Duval, continued Ellos), dies at age 66.

=== April ===
- April 24:
  - Claude Henri, French comics writer and artist (Hourrah Freddi, Lynx Blanc, P'tit Joc, Charles Oscar), dies at age 74.
  - André Fernez, Belgian comics writer, novelist and chief editor of Tintin between 1947 and 1959, dies at age 72.
- April 28: Edwina Dumm, American comics artist (Cap Stubbs and Tippie) dies at age 96.

=== May ===
- May 7: Pier Lorenzo De Vita, Italian comics artist (Tuffolino, Pecos Bill, Disney comics, Mopsi, Giso e Leo), dies at age 80.
- May 15: Porfiri Nikitich Krylov, Russian painter, illustrator and poster designer (member of the collective Kukryniksy), dies at age 87.
- May 25: William Overgard, American comics artist (continued Steve Roper and Mike Nomad and Kerry Drake), dies at age 64.
- May 31: William Timym, also known as Tim, Austrian-British animator and comics artist (The Boss, Caesar, Bengo the Boxer, Wuff, Tuff and Snuff, Bim, Bam and Boom, Oh, Johnny!, Bleep and Booster), dies at age 87.

=== June ===
- June 23: Howard Boughner, American comics artist (Mac, Hold Everything, writer of Penny and Dotty Dripple, assisted on Dumb Dora and Wash Tubbs), dies at age 81.
- June 30: Jacques Lob, French comics artist (Ténébrax, Blanche Epiphanie, Submerman, Superdupont), dies at age 67.

=== July ===
- July 15: Ben Abas, Dutch comics artist (Spot Morton, Lex Brand, Martin Evans), dies at age 63 or 64.
- July 17: George Waiss, American animator and comics artist (Disney comics), dies at age 83.
- July 18: Yves Chaland, French comics artist (Freddy Lombard), dies in a car accident at age 33.
- July 18: Georges Dargaud, French comics publisher (Dargaud), dies at age 79.
- July 25: Sam Grainger, American comics artist (Marvel Comics), dies at age 60.

=== August ===
- August 7: Phiny Dick, Dutch comics writer and artist (Miezelientje, Olle Kapoen, Birre Beer), also wife of Marten Toonder, dies at age 77.
- August 12: B. Kliban, American cartoonist (Playboy), dies of a pulmonary embolism at age 55.
- August 28: Willy Vandersteen, Belgian comics artist (Suske en Wiske, De Familie Snoek, De Vrolijke Bengels, 't Prinske, De Rode Ridder, Bessy, Robert en Bertrand, De Geuzen), dies at age 77.

=== September ===
- September 5: Jerry Iger, American comics publisher (co-founder of Eisner & Iger) writer and artist, dies at age 87.
- September 20:
  - Byron Aptosoglou, Greek illustrator and comics artist (The Superman, Mikrós Íros (Little Hero), Tarzan comics), dies at age 67 or 68.
  - Attilio Micheluzzi, Italian comics artist (Roy Mann, Petra Chérie, Johnny Focus), dies at age 60.

=== October ===
- October 14: Art Huhta, American comics artist (Dinky Dinkerton, Wild Rose, assisted on Mescal Ike, Lolly Gags and The Nebbs), dies at age 88.
- October 29: François Gianolla, Belgian poet, playwright, cartoonist, illustrator, musician, caricaturist and comics artist (Fred, Mile et Bob), dies at age 83.
- October 31: Roger Price, American humorist, writer, publisher and cartoonist (creator of droodles), dies at age 72.
- Specific date in October unknown: Dan DeCarlo Jr., American comic artist (Archie Comics), dies at age 52 from stomach cancer.

=== December ===
- December 21: Susi Weigel, Austrian illustrator, comics artist and animator (worked for Unsere Zeitung), dies at age 76.
- December 30: Tony Abruzzo, American comics artist (made romance comics for National Periodicals (later DC Comics), dies at age 74.

=== Specific date unknown ===
- Dennis Collins, British comics artist (The Perishers), dies.
- Cram, Belgian cartoonist (De Weyfelaers, Jan Pech), dies at age 51 or 52.
- Marcel Dehaye, Belgian journalist, novelist, comics writer and chief editor of Tintin (1959-1965), dies at age 82 or 83.
- Nicholas, aka Nick Firfires, American illustrator and comics artist (made realistically drawn comics for Disney and the celebrity comic based on Gene Autry), dies at age 72 or 73.
- Ye Hung-chia, Taiwanese comics artist (Chuko Szu-lang), dies at age 76 or 77.
- Walter Kellermann, German comics artist (Silberpfeil), dies at age 66 or 67.
- Leo Rawlings, British comic artist (Sergeant Bob Millar), dies at age 71 or 72.
- Maurice Roggeman, Belgian painter, illustrator, comic writer and artist (Proleetje & Fantast, scripted by novelist Louis Paul Boon), dies at age 77 or 78.
- Yu Takita, Japanese manga artist (Terajima-cho (The Terajima Neighborhood Mystery tales), dies at age 57 or 58.

== Conventions ==
- January 6–7: Great Eastern Conventions (New York City)
- January 24–28: Angoulême International Comics Festival (Angoulême, France)
- February 17–18: Motor City Comic Con (Dearborn Civic Center, Dearborn, Michigan) — guests include Erik Larsen, Gary Kwapisz, Jeff Albrecht, John Ostrander, Kim Yale, Marshall Rogers, Matt Feazell, Mike Grell, Norm Breyfogle, Rob Liefeld, and Tim Dzon
- April: Glasgow Comic Art Convention (Glasgow City Chambers, Glasgow, Scotland) — presentation of the Speakeasy Awards
- April 1: Great Eastern Conventions (Albany Marriott, Albany, New York)
- April 8: Great Eastern Conventions (Sheraton S.F. Airport Hotel, San Francisco, California)
- April 29: Great Eastern Conventions (Holiday Inn Ashley Plaza, Tampa, Florida)
- May 6: Great Eastern Conventions (Colony Square Hotel, Atlanta, Georgia)
- May 12: Great Eastern Conventions (57 Park Plaza Hotel, Boston, Massachusetts)
- Summer: FantaCon (Empire State Plaza, Albany, New York)
- June: Heroes Convention (Charlotte, North Carolina)
- June 1–3: Great Eastern Conventions (New York Penta Hotel, New York City)
- June 29–July 1: Dragon Con/Atlanta Comics Expo/Origins Game Fair (Atlanta Hilton & Towers/Atlanta Radisson Hotel, Atlanta, Georgia) — 6,900 attendees; guest of honor: Tom Clancy; other guests include Todd McFarlane, Jim Salicrup, and Bob Budiansky
- July 6–8: Chicago Comicon (Ramada O'Hare, Rosemont, Illinois) — 5,000+ attendees; featured guests: Van Williams, Gerard Christopher, Harvey Kurtzman, and Erik Larsen; other guests: Mark Gruenwald, Jim Starlin, Tom DeFalco, Len Strazewski, John Ostrander, Kim Yale, Chuck Fiala, P. Craig Russell, Charlie Athanas, Dick Locher, Max Allan Collins, Rick Obadiah, and Tony Caputo.
- July 13–15: Dallas Fantasy Fair (Dallas, Texas) — official guests include Harvey Kurtzman, Neil Gaiman, Todd Klein, Tom Orzechowski, Sergio Aragonés, Chester Brown, Bob Burden, Kurt Busiek, Will Eisner, Kerry Gammill, Gilbert Hernandez, Jaime Hernandez, Adam Hughes, Jim Lee, P. Craig Russell, Mark Schultz, Julius Schwartz, Bill Sienkiewicz, Jim Starlin, John Totleben, Bill Willingham, and Roger Zelazny
- July 13–15: Las Vegas International All Collectibles Show (Las Vegas, Nevada) — guests include Stan Lee, Todd McFarlane, and Fabian Nicieza
- August 2–5: San Diego Comic-Con (Convention and Performing Arts Center and Holiday Inn, San Diego, California) — 13,000 attendees; official guests: Peter David, Will Eisner, Kelly Freas, Michael Kaluta, Mel Lazarus, Carl Macek, Grant Morrison, John Romita Jr., and Van Williams
- August 4–5: Comix Fair '90 (Holiday Inn Medical Center, Houston, Texas) — eighth annual show; guests include Bill Hinds, Jeff Millar, and Doug Hazlewood
- August 17–19: Atlanta Fantasy Fair XVI (Omni Hotel & Georgia World Congress Center, Atlanta, Georgia) — official guests include Jack Kirby, John de Lancie, Sandahl Bergman, Catherine Hicks, Julius Schwartz, Sharon Green, Linda Thorson, Martin Caidin, Greg Theakston, Boris Vallejo, and Carl Macek
- September 22–24: United Kingdom Comic Art Convention (UKCAC) (UCL Institute of Education, London, UK) — presentation of the Eagle Awards
- October–November: FIBDA (Amadora, Portugal) — inaugural edition; guests include Morris
- October 20–21: Toronto Comic and Sequential Art Exposition (Arts, Crafts Hobbies Building, Exhibition Place, Toronto, Ontario, Canada)
- October 27–28: Killer Con (Ferndale Community Center, Ferndale, Michigan) — guests include Bill Reinhold, Mark Bagley, Sam Kieth, Keith Pollard, William Messner-Loebs, Doug Rice, Flint Henry, Chuck Dixon, Beau Smith, Gary Kwapisz, Matt Feazell, and Tim Dzon
- October 28–November 4: Salone Internazionale dei Comics (Palazzo dello Sport, Lucca, Italy) — 18th edition of the festival

== Awards ==
=== Eisner Awards ===
Presented in 1991 for comics published in 1990.

- Best Story or Single Issue: Concrete Celebrates Earth Day, by Paul Chadwick, Charles Vess, and Jean "Moebius" Giraud (Dark Horse)
- Best Continuing Series: Sandman, by Neil Gaiman and various artists (DC)
- Best Black and White Series: Xenozoic Tales, by Mark Schultz (Kitchen Sink)
- Best Finite Series: Give Me Liberty, by Frank Miller and Dave Gibbons (Dark Horse)
- Best Graphic Album—New: Elektra Lives Again, by Frank Miller and Lynn Varley (Marvel)
- Best Graphic Album—Reprint: Sandman: The Doll's House by Neil Gaiman and various artists (DC)
- Best Writer: Neil Gaiman, Sandman (DC)
- Best Writer/Artist or Writer/Artist Team: Frank Miller and Geof Darrow, Hard Boiled
- Best Artist: Steve Rude, Nexus
- Best Inker: Al Williamson
- Hall of Fame: R. Crumb, Alex Toth

=== Zine Zone Awards ===
For independent and small-press comics; presented in June 1990 by Zine Zone chairperson Terry Hooper. (Zine Zone was based in Bristol, UK.)

- Best Science Fiction Writer: Tom Elmes
- Best Science Fiction Artist: Petri Hiltinen
- Best Science Fiction Zine: Tahti Vaeltaja (Finland)
- Best Horror Writer: Rob Gott
- Best Horror Artist: David Stephenson
- Best Horror Zine: Lippe 10 (Germany)
- Best Adventure Writer: Ludwig Kreutzner
- Best Adventure Artist: Rudolph Perez
- Best Adventure Zine: Zebra (Germany)
- Best Funny Animal Comic: Blues Bar by Bernd Gronenberg (Germany)
- Best Action Comic: Stormwatcher by Ian Abbinnett and Alan Cowsill (UK)
- Best Erotic Comic: Johnny Condom by Steve Harrison (UK)
- Best Slice of Life Comic: Love and Rockets
- Best Text Feature: Small Press World by Hal Hargit (Amazing Heroes)
- Journal Most Helpful to Small Press: Amazing Heroes
- Best Indie/Small Press Journal: Comics F/X
- Best Column: Trade Secrets by Kyle Miller
- Best Original Strip: The Desert Peach by Donna Barr
- Best Humor Writer: Donna Barr
- Best Packaged Title: Kannus (Finland)
- Best Mini-Comic: Testosterone City by Peter Bagge
- Best Indie Artist: Matt "D'Israeli" Brooker
- Best Small Press Album: Heroes from the Black Lagoon (Germany)
- Best European Artist: Martin Frei (Germany)
- Most Promising Newcomer: Terry Ford (UK)
- Person Doing the Most for UK Comics History: Denis Gifford
- Greatest Influence in Comics: Jack Kirby

== First issues by title ==
=== DC Comics ===
Justice League Quarterly

Release: Winter.

Superboy v2

Release: February

==== Limited series ====
The Atlantis Chronicles

Release: March. Writer: Peter David. Artist: Esteban Maroto.

The Books of Magic v1

Release: Writer: Neil Gaiman. Artists: John Bolton, Scott Hampton, Charles Vess & Paul Johnson.

Breathtaker

Release: July Writer: Mark Wheatley. Artist: Marc Hempel.

Hawkworld (3 issues, later became an ongoing)

Release: June. Writers: John Ostrander and Timothy Truman. Artist: Graham Nolan.

Twilight

Release: December. Writers: Howard Chaykin. Artist: José Luis García-López.

World Without End

Release: January. Writers: Jamie Delano. Artist: John Higgins.

==== One-shots ====
Batman: Digital Justice

Release: 1990 Writer/Artist: Pepe Moreno.

=== Marvel Comics ===
Camp Candy

Release: May.

Ghost Rider v2

Release: May. Writer: Howard Mackie. Artists: Javier Saltares & Mark Texeira.

Guardians of the Galaxy v1

Release: June.

Knights of Pendragon

Release: July by Marvel UK. Writers: Dan Abnett and John Tomlinson. Artist: Gary Erskine.

Spider-Man

Release: August. Writer & Artist: Todd McFarlane
Issued with regular and silver ink covers, second printing with gold ink cover.

RoboCop

Release: March. Writer: Alan Grant. Artists: Lee Sullivan & Kim DeMulder.

Marvel Super-Heroes v2

Release: May.

Mighty Mouse

Release: October.

Namor the Sub-Mariner

Release: April

New Warriors

Release: July. Writer: Fabian Nicieza. Artists: Mark Bagley & Al Williamson.

Nomad

Release: November. Writer: Fabian Nicieza. Artists: James Fry & Mark McKenna.

Tomorrow Knights

Release: June by Epic Comics.

Zorro

Release: December.

==== Limited Series ====
Alien Legion: On The Edge

Release: November.

Atomic Age

Release: November by Epic Comics. Writer: Frank Lovece. Artists: Mike Okamoto & Al Williamson.

Black Knight

Release: June.

Brute Force

Cadillacs and Dinosaurs

Release: November by Epic Comics.

Darkman v1

Release: August.

Deathlok v1

Release: July.

Critical Mass

Release: January by Epic Comics. Writer: D. G. Chichester and Margaret Clark.

Elsewhere Prince

Release: May by Epic Comics. Writer/Artist: Moebius.

Fafhrd and the Gray Mouser

Release: October by Epic Comics. Writer: Howard Chaykin. Artist: Mike Mignola.

Foolkiller v1

Release: October.

Hero: Warrior of the Mystic Realms

Release: May.

Hollywood Superstars

Release: November by Epic Comics. Writer: Mark Evanier. Artist: Dan Spiegle.

Impossible Man Summer Vacation Spectacular

Release: August

The Last American

Release: December by Epic Comics. Writers: John Wagner & Alan Grant. Artist: Mike McMahon.

New Adventures of Cholly & Flytrap

Release: December by Epic Comics.

Punisher Armory

Release: July. Writer:

RoboCop 2

Release: August.

Saga of the Original Human Torch

Release: April. Writer: Roy Thomas.

X-Men Spotlight On... Starjammers

Release: May

Stalkers

Release: April

Steeltown Rockers

Release: April. Writer: Elaine Lee. Artist: Steve Leialoha.

The Thanos Quest

Release: September. Writer: Jim Starlin. Artist: Ron Lim.

==== One-shots ====
The Return of Shang-Chi, Master of Kung Fu: Bleeding Black

Release: February.

=== Shogakukan ===
Basara

Release: September on Betsucomi. Author: Yumi Tamura.

=== Independent titles ===
Classics Illustrated v2

Criminal Macabre: A Cal McDonald Mystery

Release:

Hate

Release: April by Fantagraphics. Writer/Artist: Peter Bagge.

Judge Dredd Megazine

Release: October by Egmont UK.

Logan's Run

Release:

==== Limited series ====
Big Numbers (2 issues before cancellation)

Release: April by Mad Love. Writer: Alan Moore Artist: Bill Sienkiewicz.

Bratpack

Release: August by King Hell Press. Writer & artist: Rick Veitch.

Cages

Release: December by Tundra Publishing. Writer/Artist: Dave McKean.

Give Me Liberty

Release: June. Writer: Frank Miller. Artist: Dave Gibbons.

Hard Boiled

Release: September. Writer: Frank Miller. Artist: Geoff Darrow.

The Men In Black

Release: January. Writer: Lowell Cunningham. Artist: Sandy Carruthers

Terminator: The Burning Earth

Release: March. Writer: Ron Fortier. Artist: Alex Ross.

The Terminator: Tempest

Release: August by Dark Horse Comics.

== Initial appearance by character name ==
=== DC Comics ===
- Atlan in The Atlantis Chronicles #5 (July)
- Atom (Adam Cray) in Suicide Squad #44 (August)
- Auberon in The Sandman #19 (September)
- Beefeater in Justice League Europe #20 (November)
- Blaze in Action Comics #655 (July)
- Danny the Street in Doom Patrol #35 (August)
- Delirium in The Sandman #21 (December)
- Jack Drake in Batman #455 (October)
- Tim Drake as Robin in Batman #442 (January)
- Dreamslayer in Justice League Europe #15 (June)
- Echo in Justice League Quarterly #1 (Winter)
- Laurel Gand in Legion of Super-Heroes #5 (March)
- Gorgon in Justice League Europe #15 (June)
- Hank Henshaw in Adventures of Superman #465 (April)
- Timothy Hunter in The Books of Magic #1
- Willoughby Kipling in Doom Patrol #31 (April)
- Legion in Green Lantern: Emerald Dawn #2 (January)
- Orishas in Firestorm #95 (March)
- Titania in The Sandman #19 (September)
- Tracer in Justice League Europe #16 (July)
- Trinity in New Titans Annual #6
- Yuga Khan in New Gods #17 (June)

=== Marvel Comics ===
- Abominatrix in Sensational She-Hulk #21 (November)
- Agamemnon in The Incredible Hulk (December)
- Blackout in Ghost Rider v2 #2 (June)
- Bliss in Uncanny X-Men #261 (May)
- Bloodlust in Marvel Comics Presents #48 (April)
- Bloodwraith in Black Knight #2 (July)
- Cable in New Mutants #87 (March)
- Captain Atlas in Quasar #9 (April)
- Cardiac in The Amazing Spider-Man #342 (December)
- Deathlok (Michael Collins) in Deathlok #1 (July)
- Deathwatch in Ghost Rider #1 (May)
- Jack D'Uria in Ghost Rider #4 (Aug)
- Kearson DeWitt in Iron Man Annual #13 (July)
- Foolkiller (Kurt Gerhardt) in Foolkiller #1 (October)
- Gambit in Uncanny X-Men Annual #14
- Ghost Rider (Danny Ketch) in Ghost Rider #1 (May)
- Midnight's Fire in New Warriors #2 (August)
- Mindblast in The Amazing Spider-Man #340 (October)
- Julius Rassitano in The Mighty Thor #426 (November)
- Mutant Liberation Front in The New Mutants #86 (February) (all members appeared at the date mentioned, except where noted. otherwise)
  - Dragoness in New Mutants #93 (September)
  - Forearm
  - Kamikaze in New Mutants #93 (September)
  - Reaper
  - Strobe
  - Stryfe
  - Tempo
  - Thumbelina
  - Wildside
  - Zero
- Psionex in New Warriors #4 (October)
- Silhouette in New Warriors #2 (August)
- Whiplash (Leeann Foreman) in Marvel Comics Presents #46 (May)

=== Independent titles ===
- Armoured Gideon in 2000AD (March 24)
- Garganta in Femforce #30
- Madman in Creatures of the Id (October)

=== Newspapers ===
- Peggy Jean in Peanuts (July 23)
- The Teenage Mutant Ninja Turtles (December 10)
