= The Original Astro Boy =

1980s comic book series

Publication information
- Publisher: NOW Comics
- Schedule: Monthly
- Publication date: September 18, 1987 - June 23, 1989
- No. of issues: 20

Creative team
- Written by: Ken Steacy, Michael Dimpsey
- Artist(s): Ken Steacy, Brian Thomas, Andrew Pratt
- Letterer(s): Andrew Pratt, Marc Hansen

The Original Astro Boy is a twenty-issue 1980s comic book series (with one Astro Boy short story in Speed Racer #17) by NOW Comics, based on the original Japanese Mighty Atom series by Osamu Tezuka. The series was based mostly on the 1963 Astro Boy anime series, but began to include elements from the 1980 series in later issues. The comic went through three writers and artists, and embellished the original plotline, despite only covering the first episode of the 1963 series.

== Main story ==
The series begins with Dr. Boynton (Doctor Tenma) putting together Astro Boy, and immediately adopting him under the name "Astor." After only a few days, Boynton becomes fed up with Astro's cold, unchildlike behavior, and plans to shut down and discard him. However, Astro begins to discover that he has powers and was based on Boynton's dead son. In the meantime, the army attempts to capture Astro, as it is hinted that Boynton borrowed money from the military and couldn't repay them. Dr. Elefun (Professor Ochanomizu) is also trying to find Astro, as well as keep the Institute of Science under control. Astro is sold to the circus with an implanted robot named Bruno (a sentient bomb looking like a spider), where he discovers his fellow robots are constantly in anguish. From there, Astro is pulled into the middle of the robot rights revolution. This story was covered in issues 1–10.

=== Megathreat ===
Following the end of the initial storyline, issue 12 focused on the president of a large company called Megacorp hiring a cloaked figure named Agent R to lure in and destroy Astro. Agent R (shown later to be Lance Lumiere, former Institute of Science researcher) used a bulky robot named 'Megathreat' to kidnap a boy named Archie from Astro's school. Archie happens to be the Megacorp president's son, and the plan begins to fail. Astro, in the meantime, is recovering from an internal overload after saving a police car from sinking in the bay. Despite Elefun's warning, Astro goes out to save Archie, destroys Megathreat and earns the Megacorp president's respect.

=== The Cybot Arc ===
This was the point in the series when Brian Thomas took over as the main artist, adopting Astro's 1980 character design. Issues 16-18 featured Astro going on a rocket to space, with General Hawkins hoping to find out the reason for multiple shuttle disappearances around a certain area. As Astro and the flight crew prepare to depart, Astro Girl hides on board, with Dr. I.Q. Plenty and Spud doing the same. Dr. Boynton appears one last time and gives Astro a special back-up battery cell, but warns Astro not to let it overload. While in space, the ship is attacked by a grotesque monster, and crashes on the planet of the Cybots. Astro and the crew are dragged to the palace of King Cosmo, the leader of the Cybots. The Cybots, as it was hinted in earlier issues, were a brand of extremely advanced androids who faced human discrimination and were forced to flee to space. King Cosmo finds Astro Girl and orders his men to destroy her, forcing Astro to fight them. After Astro tells Cosmo that humans and robots are equals now, he explodes from the overloading battery. While I.Q. and the shuttle crew try to repair Astro, King Cosmo announces that the population of Cybots will be returning to Earth, along with the members of the previously captured ships.

== The series ==
The Astro Boy license was sold to Tony C. Caputo by a "Japanese national", whom actually had no legal access to Tezuka's characters. (Since the bankruptcy of Mushi Production in 1973, and due to the ensuing court-ordered settlement, ownership of Tezuka's copyrights came into question and would not be resolved for almost thirty years.) This person is only credited as Suzuki & Associates in the fine print of most issues.

Brian Thomas was originally assigned as the lead artist in 1987, with Ken Steacy as the cover artist, but Steacy offered to do full-colour artwork and be paid in Canadian dollars. Ken Steacy became the artist until issue #16 and writer for issues #8-17, before Brian Thomas took over fully. Sales rose, but the series was cancelled after NOW! Comics got a deal for newsstand distribution for all of their titles.

While dedicating itself to the 1960s anime's continuum, the first nine issues were a longer, drawn-out version of only the anime's first episode. Despite taking quite a few elements and character designs from the 1980s series, the editors claimed that the then-newer anime "did not stand up to (the) old black-and-white version". The comic possessed a greater level of war and robot-to-human violence, greatly differing from Osamu Tezuka's original morals. The comic seemed to be intended for an older audience until halfway through the series, when Michael Dimpsey left NOW Comics and Ken Steacy became the main writer. After this change of writers, there were a string of light stand-alone plots, going until the cancellation of the series.

== Characters ==
- Dr. Boynton - Astro's creator and "father". Boynton went slightly insane, following his divorce and the death of his son Astor, and became a recluse. He built Astro as a replacement for his son, but soon became disappointed with the result. Boynton clashes with Astro Boy constantly, at one point putting a tracker named Bruno in Astro and selling him to a circus. Later on, he appears to regret his actions, and secretly shows up to help Astro. He is based directly on the character Dr. Tenma.
- Dr. Elefun - A scientist vying for Boynton's role as Director of the institute, whom later saves Astro from the robot circus. In addition to teaching and taking care of Astro for a few issues, he enrolls Astro in school and builds him two parents and a sister. He is directly based on Professor Ochanomizu.
- Mr. Cacciatore - The ringmaster and owner of the Robot Circus. He buys Astro from Dr. Boynton and sets him through various jobs and dangerous stunts in the circus, threatening to activate a robot spider bomb that Boynton has implanted in Astro's chest cabinet. He is directly based on Osamu Tezuka's character Ham Egg.
- General Hawkins - A short, portly woman in charge of the local army base. Before the current storyline, Hawkins lends money to Boynton to help with building Astro. However, she expected Astro to be able to work with the military, and tries to recapture him at the cost of destroying a neighborhood.
- Tas Tamil - A man at the Institute of Science who is attempting to take Boynton's place as director. Tas begins working with General Hawkins and Cacciatore. Despite being much more meeker and scheming, he is based directly on the character Duke Red.
- Bruno - A robotic spider built by Boynton, which is a combined tracker and bomb. It is connected to a remote, and designed to give a disobedient Astro an electric shock at the push of a button.
- Simon - A male android at the Robot Circus. He befriends Astro immediately, and tells him of the horrible conditions he and the robots are in. Simon, later on, attempts to remove Bruno from Astro's system, but Bruno detonates in Simon's hand and kills him.
- Rebecca and Elmer - Two researchers at the Institute of Science. Elmer pines after Rebecca, only to neutral response from her. Late into the 10th issue, they are killed by a creature called the Cyber Shark, but rebuilt by Elefun as robots. They then go to live with Astro as his parents. The whole time, they look identical to Astro's robot parents in the 1980s series.
- Astro Girl - Astro's sister, built and given to him by Dr. Elefun. She is very much identical-looking to her animated version, there known as Uran. She is much more curious and willing to get into trouble.
- Dr. I.Q. Plenty - A short, arrogant scientist who tries to become the new leader of the Institute of Science. He is pushy and indignant about becoming the director, and on the side, he attempts to woo Rebecca. I.Q. lives alone, his only companion a dog named Spud, who wears a special collar that enables him to talk. I.Q. is based entirely on Dr. Fooler, an obscure character in Tezuka's manga.
- Astor Boynton - Boynton's deceased son. Astor did not get a lot of character development, but he was shown to be an energetic and loving boy. He sees firsthand the divorce of Boynton and his wife Jean. One day, Boynton breaks his promise to take Astor to the zoo, but programs a robotic car to take Astor there alone. Halfway through the truck, a large truck hits Astor's car and kills him. He is based directly on Tobio Tenma.
- Kristal Kleer - A young girl in Astro's class, whom he meets in issue #11. She is very friendly and, later on, affectionate to Astro, whom calls her "Kris".

== End of the series ==
There was a small team of artists working on the series, many of them completing two or more tasks. NOW Comics was slowly reaching bankruptcy, and company president Tony C. Caputo would reportedly "forget" to pay his employees, or simply cut down their payrolls. This began to greatly affect the quality of Ken Steacy's later issues. Eventually, despite rising sales for Brian Thomas's issues, the series was cancelled and removed from circulation, while NOW's version of Speed Racer continued on for a few years afterwards. A short Astro Boy story by Thomas, originally made in mid-1987, did appear in issue #17 of NOW Comics's Speed Racer comic. It was published February, 1989; the same month as Osamu Tezuka's death.
