= Fright Night (disambiguation) =

Fright Night is a 1985 horror film.

Fright Night or Fright Nights may also refer to:

== Films ==
- Fright Night (1947 film), a short film starring The Three Stooges
- Fright Night (2011 film), the 2011 remake of the 1985 film
- Fright Night Part 2, the 1988 sequel to the 1985 film
- Fright Night 2: New Blood, the 2013 sequel to the 2011 film

== Television ==
- Fright Night (TV series), a New York / Los Angeles television show
- "Fright Night", a season 4 episode of The Brady Bunch
- "Fright Night", a season 1 episode of The Carrie Diaries
- "Fright Night", a season 4 episode of Best of Luck Nikki (an Indian adaptation of Good Luck Charlie)
- "Fright Night", a season 3 episode of Life with Derek
- "Fright Night", a season 3 episode of Night Gallery
- "Fright Night", a season 7 episode of Perfect Strangers
- "Fright Night," a season 23 episode of Arthur

== Theme park events ==
- Fright Nights, a seasonal Halloween event at Warner Bros. Movie World in Australia
- Fright Nights, a Halloween event during October and November in Thorpe Park
- Fright Nights, the original title of the first year of Halloween Horror Nights at Universal Studios Florida
- Fright Nights, the original title of Six Flags Fright Fest at Six Flags AstroWorld
- Fright Nights, a Halloween event during October and November in Walibi Holland

== Other uses ==
- Fright Night (franchise), a franchise spawned from the 1985 film
  - Fright Night (comic line), a comic book line
  - Fright Night (comic series), a comic book series
  - Fright Night (video game), a 1988 game for the Amiga platform based on the 1985 film
- Fright Night (album), an album by power metal band Stratovarius
- A colloquial name for the Battle of Norfolk in the 1991 Gulf War

== See also ==
- Night Fright, a 1967 American horror film
- "Night Fright" (Arthur), a season 2 episode of Arthur
- "Nightfright", an episode of Scooby-Doo! Mystery Incorporated
