= Fright Night (comic line) =

1985 comic book line

Publication information
- Publisher: Now Comics
- Genre: Horror
- No. of issues: 22 issues 1 original annual 1 graphic novel

Creative team
- Written by: Tony Caputo; Katherine Llewellyn; Diane M. Piron-Gelman; James Van Hise; Joe Gentile; Matthew Costello
- Artist(s): Dell Barras; Hannibal King; Eric Brant; Jeff Starling; Alan Freeman; Ken Call; Corey Wilkinson; Jim Reddington
- Penciller(s): Lenin Delsol; Neil Vokes; Kevin West; James Lyle; Doug Murphy
- Inker(s): John Stangeland; David Mowry; Damon Willis; Nick Sigismondi; Jeff Dee; Mark Pennington
- Letterer(s): Dan Nakrosis; Kurt Hathaway; Patrick Williams; Joseph Allen; Katherine Mayer
- Colorist(s): Katherine Llewellyn; Tammy Daniel; Nanette Injeski; Tom Gianni; Suzanne Dechnik; Patrick Owsley
- Editor(s): Katherine Llewellyn; Tony Caputo

Fright Night is a comic book line spun off from the 1985 film of the same name published by NOW Comics. it consisted of one main series named Fright Night which has an annual and several reprinting specials, as well as a graphic novel based on the second film which is out of continuity with the main series.

== History ==
The February 1988 issue of Now Comics News announced that the popular film Fright Night was being spun off into a comic book series by Now Comics, a small publishing company that licensed a variety of popular television and movie characters and which had a reputation for being plagued by various financial and creative difficulties. In the original announcement, the adaptation of the first film was going to be released as a high-quality "prestige format" book, issue #1 would be an adaptation of the second film, and that would be followed by new stories. What ultimately happened, however, is the adaptation of the original movie got split across the first two issues and Fright Night Part 2 was issued as a stand-alone prestige format book featuring a story which was not canonical with the rest of the line.

The main series endured a lot of growing pains both technically and artistically. The second issue abruptly picks up where the first story left off with no indication that a story preceded it except for the page numbering, which begins at 22. Eight of the first nine issues include short stories unrelated to Fright Night, including six chapters of Rust, the post-apocalyptic tale of a disfigured cop which originally ran from 1987-1988, that the publishers were preparing to relaunch for the second of three incarnations.

There was a revolving door of staff members, with only editor-in-chief Tony Caputo and editor Katherine Llewellyn sticking with the book for its entire run from 1988-90. Llewellyn was credited and worked in numerous capacities, editing stories, coloring frames, checking continuity and writing scripts. Lenin Delsol penciled the adaptations of both films as well as some of the early issues, but presumably he got tied up with other works as three issues were credited as "guest-penciled by Doug Murphy." Neil Vokes agreed to come to work for NOW Comics with the proviso he be allowed to work on Fright Night, which he's cited as a favorite film, but he became disenchanted with the work environment and eventually quit. Future regular Guardians of the Galaxy penciler Kevin West got his start picking up where Vokes left off and continued to work on Fright Night until the end - though issue #18 was inexplicably penciled by James Lyle. The writing was slightly more consistent. The adaptations of the films followed the source material fairly closely, and then James Van Hise took over writing duties for the first batch of original stories. Tony Caputo took the reins for issues #8-12, injecting a slightly more comedic tone, and then Mark Wheatley penned a single issue which was a complete and total departure from the ongoing plot. Beginning with issue #14, Katherine Llewellyn was credited as both writer and editor, and she closely followed the storyline that Caputo had established before handing off the writing to Diane M. Piron-Gelman (aka novelist D.M. Pirrone).

The main comic ran for 22 issues until July 1990, when NOW was forced to file Chapter 7 bankruptcy, so production of the line was halted and storylines were never tied up. After corporate restructuring, the comic label briefly returned and, in 1992 and 1993, four special "annual" 3-D issues were released. Three of these were merely 3-D reprints, but the 1993 "Fright Night 3-D Halloween Annual" featured a completed but previously unpublished story titled "Nightmares."

In 2003, the company relaunched under the moniker Now Comics 3.0, and it was announced that they'd be releasing a Fright Night graphic novel by Caputo and Vokes (presumably this would have been the previously published 2-parter "The Revenge of Evil Ed!," the only story by Caputo & Vokes that wasn't reprinted in 3-D) but the book never came to fruition before the company folded again in 2005.

== Publications ==
=== Series ===
Issues

Annuals

Title	Date	Notes
"Fright Night 3-D Halloween Annual"	1993	Debut printing of "Nightmares".

Reprints

Title	Date	Notes
"Fright Night 3-D Special"	1992	A 3-D reprint of "Psychedelic Death" parts 1 & 2.
"Fright Night 3-D Fall Special"	1992	A 3-D reprint of "The Resurrection of Dracula" parts 1 & 2.
"Fright Night 3-D Winter Special"	1993	A 3-D reprint of "The Dead Remember."

=== One-shots ===
Title	Date	Notes
Fright Night Part 2	1988	Adaptation of the second film, released as a stand-alone Graphic novel.
