= Ralph Snart Adventures =

Ralph Snart Adventures, Volume 3, Number 1, September 1988. Transition from black & white to full color comic book format.

Ralph Snart Adventures is a comic book written by Marc Hansen and published between 1986 and 1993 by NOW Comics and currently being published by its creator Marc Hansen.

Ralph Snart is an example of absurdity in modern comics. All characters are depicted as grotesque and ugly, with bulbous noses and bulging eyes. Many of the male characters have physiques that ripple with muscles in unlikely places, an obvious deconstruction of the popularity of the muscle-sculpted weightlifter as male action hero in the 1980s. Hansen likes to elevate the mundane to epic proportions in Ralph Snart; for example Ralph would take terrible risks and great journeys to obtain a case of beer. Another example is an alien attempt to dominate humanity in order to brew fermented beverages from human tissues.

The title character, Ralph Snart, is a Walter Mitty type who frequently escapes the painful realities of his life by daydreaming himself into incredible and often bizarre adventures. As the series progresses, his real life becomes as strange as his daydreams until there is not much to differentiate the two states. For this reason, his brain is sought by the arch-villain, Dr. Goot. Ralph's insanity takes the form of delusional fantasies, mostly consisting of drinking beer, that provide sub-plot respites from the main plot: Dr. Goot's eternal quest to use Ralph's brain for his own evil ends.

== The black and white boom ==
In June 1986, NOW Comics released the first volume of Ralph Snart Adventures as a three-issue limited series in black and white. The character of Ralph Snart had his origins in a fanzine published by Tony Caputo who decided the character should graduate to his own feature at NOW. The series centered on Ralph, a man driven insane by the pressures of daily life now locked away in a mental asylum. He would escape his prison-like room at the asylum by dreaming himself into fantastic scenarios based on science-fiction or fantasy where he was an aggressive, cynical and sarcastic personality. The series ended with Ralph's "amazing dream powers" apparently too much for his body to contain, and his brain exploded.

== The regular series ==
In November 1986, Ralph returned in an ongoing series that began as a black & white book but later changed to full color. It picked up from the end of Volume 1, with Ralph the victim of a brain explosion. His neurologist Dr. Kreegon performed an experimental surgery that put Ralph back together, with a new lease on life. However, after being released from the hospital, life once again dealt Ralph a series of harsh blows with Ralph ultimately being gunned down and killed by a villainous mad scientist named Dr. Goot. Goot resurrects Ralph as a Frankenstein-like creation with the aim of using him as a weapon to commit crimes like bank robbery. Goot later realizes that Ralph's best asset is his amazing brain. Goot removes Ralph's brain, discarding his body, and uses the brain as a power source in a giant robotic frog also designed to rob banks. Ralph's brain ends up being mutated by toxins, grows arms, legs, and a face and wanders the countryside until it reaches the offices of NOW Comics and demands that Marc Hansen rewrite the story so that Ralph is whole again. Issue #8 begins with Ralph back in the mental asylum in an apparent reboot of the series. Volume 2 ends with #9, with Ralph stealing the keys to his cell from one of the guards and escaping the facility.

Volume 2 maintained the formula of Ralph's real life playing out in a framing story at the beginning and end of an issue, with the bulk of each issue being an episodic daydream story of Ralph's. The first few stories put Ralph in sci-fi or fantasy realms as before, but these are eventually replaced with tales of Ralph in a more mundane existence usually seeking the comforts of alcohol or women.

== From black and white to color ==
In September 1988, NOW Comics repackaged Ralph Snart Adventures as a full-color series. The first nine issues simply reprinted Volume 2, with some additions to the first issue that also recapped the first volume. Beginning with issue #10, the third volume presented new stories.

Picking up where Ralph was last seen, he escapes the mental asylum and wanders through a nearby city, generally harassing and confusing people on the street. Dr. Kreegon mobilizes the police force warning them that Ralph Snart is the most dangerous man alive. Ralph is gunned down but finally his body is recovered by Dr. Goot, posing as a policeman, eager for another chance to experiment on Ralph. The series continues to feature Ralph's dreamworld stories, but the framing story with Dr. Goot takes center stage more and more, often being the focus of entire issues and generally becoming just as bizarre as Ralph's dreams. Ralph becomes a mind-controlled supervillain called Goot's Goon and has several battles in the city against superheroes or the police. A late addition to the series is Holly Hornswaggle, a timid woman "with the body of a twelve-year old" who falls in love with the catatonic Ralph and helps him escape from Dr. Goot's evil lair.

The episodic dream stories in Volume 3 continued to revolve around beer, women and Ralph getting into trouble. A few of these tales shed some light on Ralph as a child. Volume 3 also introduced the popular character Mr. Lizard as Ralph's "fairy godlizard" who watched out for Ralph's well-being (but usually only after getting him into trouble first).

Another introduction was a short colorized version of stories from the black-and-white issues, presented as the reminiscences of an elderly Snart in a retirement home for comic characters in 2050. Elderly versions of Mr. Lizard and Dr. Groot are also present.

Issue #24 was Marc Hansen's last, as he quit because of late payments from NOW Comics. This was an all 3D issues with story, art and 3D conversions done by Marc Hansen. Issues #25 and #26 were done by the staff of NOW Comics in violation of copyright and trademark laws, but Marc Hansen did not take any legal action for unknown reasons.

== Mind Games ==
In May 1992, after a year-and-a-half hiatus, Marc Hansen returned to NOW Comics with a new series of Ralph Snart Adventures. This was a three-issue limited series subtitled "Mind Games" which attempted to give the series a fresh start. His troubles long behind him, Ralph was now married with children and seemingly living a normal life with a regular office job. He claims he testified against Dr. Goot and had him sent to prison, went through therapy with Dr. Kreegon and put all his demons behind him. In short order though, Ralph loses his job and Dr. Goot breaks out of prison, his sights set on taking revenge against Ralph.

Goot decides he can't merely kill Ralph and waste his amazing brain, though. He creates a machine capable of drawing elements out of Ralph's dreams and materializing them in the real world. He attempts to draw out Ralph's deepest inner power source but it turns out to be Mr. Lizard in disguise who has come to the real world to protect Ralph from Goot. Lizard and Ralph escape but Ralph's mind is damaged by the experimentation. Mr. Lizard takes him to see Dr. Kreegon who writes a tell-all book about Ralph and becomes rich, but x-rays show that Ralph's brain has entirely evaporated and his head is now empty. The volume ends with Ralph jumping up and running out the door, to an unknown destination.

== The Lost Issues ==
As a follow-up to Volume 4, NOW Comics repackaged three issues that had been penned by an alternate creative team (likely back in 1990 following Volume 3) and released them as a three-issue series titled Ralph Snart Adventures: The Lost Issues.

== The final series? ==
Marc Hansen decided to bring Ralph back to a new ongoing series in July 1993. By this point, Hansen was producing only about 10 new story pages per issue, the remainder of each issue was spent reprinting his earlier stories.

This series picked up where Volume 4 left off, with a brainless Ralph wandering the countryside. He is discovered by aliens who grant him superpowers and set him on a path of destruction to the White House. The aliens hope to destroy the human race and distill their bodies into an alcoholic substance. Mr. Lizard manages to remove Ralph from harm's way but the series was cancelled with issue #5, before the storyline could resolve.

== From print to web ==
Almost ten years later, Marc Hansen reclaimed his character after NOW Comics went bankrupt and began publishing Volume 6 as a free web comic. This series picked up right where Volume 5 left off, and reintroduced the characters of Dr. Goot, Holly Hornswoggle, and Mr. Lizard. It lasted 16 issues from 2003 to 2005. The format was similar to Volume 5, with 10 pages comprising each issue, only now the pages were released one at a time as Hansen finished them and immediately posted to the site.

== New Work ==
Currently, Hansen is publishing new and reprinted work in a series of trade paperbacks.
