= Marc Hansen (cartoonist) =

American cartoonist

- Hansen in 2008
- Born: 1963 (age 62–63) Big Rapids, Michigan
- Areas: Artist, writer
- Notable works: Ralph Snart

Marc Hansen (born 1963) is a cartoonist and creator of Ralph Snart, Weird Melvin and Doctor Gorpon. He has been published by comic book companies such as NOW Comics, Marvel/Epic, Disney, Malibu Graphics and Kitchen Sink Press. Ralph Snart is his most successful creation that began in 1986, which had newsstand and direct market distribution. It peaked at 50,000 copies per month with over one million comics in print.

== Biography ==
=== Early years ===
Born the youngest of three brothers in Big Rapids, Michigan, Hansen began teaching himself to draw at an early age by copying the artists in MAD magazines. His main influences included John Stanley and Harvey Kurtzman. His humor combined with his artistic talents prompted Hansen to strive to become a professional artist and cartoonist. After receiving a degree in commercial art from Ferris State University, he moved to Chicago to work as a commercial artist.

=== Time at NOW ===
While working in Chicago, Hansen met Tony C. Caputo, the founder of NOW Comics in 1985. Hansen was hired to create a monthly comic book for the new publisher. Ralph Snart Adventures became a popular and consistent property of NOW and appeared on newsstands and in the direct market from 1986 until 1993.

For a brief period in 1988, Hansen worked on the NOW staff helping to ink, pencil and color many of the books. He wrote the Married... with Children comic under the pseudonym Ty Addams in 1991. Hansen was involved with NOW's 3.0 iteration in 2003 in which trade paperback collections of his creations were published.

=== Other works ===
In 1991, Malibu Graphics published his three issue mini-series about a monster killer called Doctor Gorpon. From 1992 until 1994, the Comics Buyer Guide published his weekly comic strip Weird Melvin, which became a five issue self-published comic series in 1995. Hansen did no comic book work until 2005, when he began self-publishing Ralph Snart as a web comic. Currently, Marc Hansen is self-publishing new and reprint material in a series of comics and trade paperbacks.
