= T-Force (disambiguation) =

T-Force may refer to:

- T-Force, a British Army force from the Second World War
- T-Force, a 1994 sci-fi film
- Mr. T and the T-Force, a comic book series
