= Doctor Gorpon =

1991 comic mini-series

Publication information
- Format: Mini-series
- Genre: see below
- Publication date: June - August 1991
- No. of issues: 3
- Main character: Doctor Gorpon

Creative team
- Created by: Marc Hansen

Collected editions
- Doctor Gorpon: ISBN 0-9745205-6-X

Doctor Gorpon is a 1991 three-issue comic book mini-series published by Malibu Comics, created by Marc Hansen.

== Plot ==
The story is about the eponymous supernatural monster killer that must pass on his legacy to a new generation. Doctor Gorpon finds such a prospect in a young rebellious teen named Doofus.

== Collected edition ==
The series was collected into a trade paperback by NOW Comics:

- Doctor Gorpon (96 pages, NOW Comics, July 2004, ISBN 0-9745205-6-X)
