= James Van Hise =

American historian

- Born: 1949 (age 76–77) U.S.
- Areas: Popular culture historian, writer, and publisher
- Notable works: Al Williamson Collector; Rocket's Blast Comicollector; The Real Ghostbusters; Batmania; The Unauthorized Trek: The Complete Star Trek: The Next Generation
- Awards: Inkpot Award, 1983

James Van Hise (born 1949) is an American popular culture historian and comic book author. He had a long connection with the popular fanzine Rocket's Blast Comicollector (RBCC), and was its editor/publisher from 1974 to 1983. He also had a lengthy association with Hal Schuster, owner of New Media Publishing and Pioneer Books. Van Hise is the author of more than ten books, many of them published by Pioneer Books.

== Career ==
Van Hise's first published works were in the ranks of fandom. He (along with Larry Bigman) wrote the Al Williamson Collector column for RBCC in the early 1970s. In 1974, Van Hise became editor and publisher of RBCC. He introduced new features and columns to the zine, freshening its aesthetic for new audiences.

He and Don Rosa (another RBCC contributor) produced the 1976 Omnicon comic convention, held in Louisville, Kentucky, in July 1976; guests included Frank Brunner, DeForest Kelley, and Michael Kaluta.

Around 1981, Van Hise hooked up with brothers Jack and Hal Schuster, who a year earlier had established New Media Publishing (NMP), hired a staff (which included Carol Kalish, Richard Howell, and Peter B. Gillis), and announced a slate of new hobbyist publications. Van Hise joined NMP as a writer and editor, with part of the deal being NMP's taking over the publication of Rocket's Blast Comicollector. NMP soon became notorious for missing publication deadlines, however, and RBCC fell victim as well, only putting out three issues in the period 1981 to 1983 before it was cancelled. While with NMP, Van Hise edited Enterprise Incidents, an influential Star Trek fanzine.

He published The Art of Al Williamson with Blue Dolphin Enterprises (the owner of Pacific Comics), in 1983, and was given an Inkpot Award at the 1983 San Diego Comic-Con.

Beginning in late 1984 NMP published Monsterland, the follow-up to Forrest J Ackerman's Famous Monsters of Filmland, and when NMP went defunct in 1985, the Schuster Brothers started up a number of other publishing entities — one of which, Movieland Publishing, continued Monsterland. Van Hise was editor of Monsterland from 1986 to 1987. During that same period Van Hise wrote a number of issues of Files Magazine, also published by Schuster's Psi Fi Movie Press, which focused "on comic characters, TV shows, rock groups, or movies, mixing text pieces with photos or drawings."

Van Hise wrote stories for comic books in the period 1988 to 1994. From 1988 to 1992 he wrote for NOW Comics' line of licensed titles, including The Real Ghostbusters, Fright Night, and Tales of the Green Hornet.

From 1989 to 1995, Van Hise published eleven books with Schuster's Pioneer Books, on such topics as Batmania, The Shadow, the Lone Ranger, the Green Hornet, dinosaur movies, and the Star Trek franchise.

In 2002–2003, Van Hise temporarily revived Rocket's Blast Comicollector, publishing four issues out of a new headquarters in Yucca Valley, California.

== Bibliography ==
=== Books ===
- The Art of Al Williamson. (San Diego, California: Blue Dolphin Enterprises, 1983) ISBN 0-943128-04-8
- (with Ed Gross) The V Files (6 volumes, New Media Books/Psi Fi Movie Press, 1985)
- Batmania (Pioneer Books, Inc., 1989) ISBN 1-55698-252-6
- How to Draw Art for Comic Books: Lessons from the Masters (Pioneer Books, Inc., 1989) ISBN 978-1-55698-254-5
- The Serial Adventures of the Shadow. Las Vegas: Pioneer Books, 1989. OCLC 166327164
- Who Was That Masked Man? The Story of the Lone Ranger. Las Vegas: Pioneer Books, 1990.
- The Green Hornet Book (Pioneer Books, 1989; re-issued by Movie Publisher Services, 1991)
- The Man Who Created Star Trek: Gene Roddenberry. Pioneer Books, 1992. ISBN 1-55698-318-2
- Batmania II (Pioneer Books, Inc., 1992) ISBN 1-55698-315-8
- Hot Blooded Dinosaur Movies. Las Vegas, NV: Pioneer Books (1993) ISBN 9781556983658
- Sci-Fi TV from Twilight Zone to Deep Space Nine. New York, Pioneer Books, 1993 ISBN 155698362X
- Batmania III (Pioneer Books, Inc., 1995) ISBN 9781556983825
- (with Hal Schuster) The Unauthorized Trek: The Complete Next Generation, (Pioneer Books, 1995) ISBN 978-1-55698-377-1
- Pulp Magazine Thrillers: Heroes & Horrors of the '30s & '40s. Yucca Valley, CA: J. Van Hise, 1998

=== Comics ===
- The Real Ghostbusters (NOW Comics, 26 issues, Aug. 1988–Dec. 1990)
- Fright Night (Now Comics, 5 issues [#3–7], Dec. 1988–May 1989)
- Tyrannosaurus Tex (Fantagraphics, 3 issues, 1991)
- "The Monster Maker," in Grave Tales #2 (Hamilton Comics, Dec. 1991)
- "A Born Werewolf," in Dread of Night #2 (Hamilton Comics, Feb. 1992)
- Tales of the Green Hornet vol. 2 (NOW Comics, 4 issues, Jan. 1992-Apr. 1992)
- Tales of the Green Hornet vol. 3 (NOW Comics, 3 issues, Sept. 1992-Nov. 1992)
- (adapting Ray Bradbury) "Usher II," in Ray Bradbury Comics #4 (Topps Comics, Aug. 1993)
- (adapting Ray Bradbury) "The Off Season," in Ray Bradbury Comics: Martian Chronicles #1 (Topps; Byron Preiss, June 1994)
