= List of Terminator comics =

Beginning in 1988, there have been many comic books published as part of the Terminator franchise from a variety of publishers, but mostly by Dark Horse Comics.

== NOW Comics ==
=== Rust (August 1988) ===
Vol. 1 Issue #12. 5 page Terminator story (predates The Terminator issue #1)

=== The Terminator (1988–1990) ===
The Terminator is the first comic book series based on The Terminator. It was published by NOW Comics from June 1988 to November 1989.

The series was selling 100,000 copies a month, and The Terminator #1 sold out.

Don Thompson with Comic Buyers Guide rated the series C-minus, saying it's "as boring as most gimmick war stories."

1. (cover date September 1988, release date June 1988)
2. (October 1988)
3. If I Had A Rocket Launcher... (November 1988)
4. Amahiri (December 1988, release date mid-October 1988)
5. The Bee Stings (February 1989, release date mid-November 1988)
6. Goin' Back To Miami (March 1989)
7. Big Bad Wolf: A Dog Bites Man Story. (April 1989)
8. In the Belly of the Beast (May 1989)
9. (June 1989)
10. (July 1989)
11. Factories (August 1989)
12. Night-Convoy (September 1989)
13. (October 1989 )
14. Into the Deep Blue Sea (November 1989)
15. See Cuba and Die! (December 1989)
16. The Battle of Cuba (January 1990)
17. Escape to Silver Dollar (cover date February 1990, release date November 1989)

=== Terminator: The Burning Earth (1990) ===
Terminator: The Burning Earth is a 5-issue comic book series from NOW Comics. It was written by Ron Fortier and illustrated by Alex Ross; it is notably Ross's first published comic book work. It ran from December 1989 to March 1990.

1. Welcome to Hell (cover date March 1990, release date December 1989)
2. A Better Mouse Trap (April 1990)
3. King of the Mountain (May 1990)
4. The Last Day (June 1990)
5. The Heart of Skynet (cover date July 1990, release date March 1990)
- TPB Terminator: The Burning Earth (June 1990)

=== The Terminator: All My Futures Past (1990) ===
1. (August 1990)
2. (September 1990)

== Dark Horse Comics ==
=== The Terminator: Tempest (1990) ===
1. Tempest Pt. 1 (August 1990)
2. Tempest Pt. 2 (September 1990)
3. Tempest Pt. 3 (October 1990)
4. Tempest Pt. 4 (November 1990)
- TPB The Terminator: Tempest (September 1991)
- HC The Terminator: Tempest (September 1991)

=== The Terminator: One Shot (1991) ===
The Terminator: One Shot is a 48-page one-shot comic book published by Dark Horse Comics in June 1991. It's by writer James Robinson and artist Matt Wagner. The comic's release was scheduled to coincide with the release of Terminator 2: Judgment Day.

1. (July 1991)

=== The Terminator: Secondary Objectives (1991) ===
The Terminator: Secondary Objectives is a 4-issue comic book miniseries published by Dark Horse Comics in 1991. It's written by James Robinson and illustrated by Paul Gulacy and Karl Kesel.

1. (July 1991)
2. (August 1991)
3. (September 1991)
4. (October 1991)
- TPB The Terminator: Secondary Objectives (March 1992)

=== The Terminator: The Enemy Within (1991–1992) ===
The Terminator: The Enemy Within is a 4-issue comic book series published by Dark Horse Comics from 1991 to 1992. It's by Ian Edginton and Vince Giarrano.

1. (November 1991)
2. (December 1991)
3. (January 1992)
4. (February 1992)
- TPB The Terminator: The Enemy Within (November 1992)

=== The Terminator: Hunters and Killers (1992) ===
1. (March 1992)
2. (April 1992)
3. (May 1992)
- TPB The Terminator: Hunters and Killers Diamond Star System Exclusive (1992)

=== The Terminator: Endgame (1992) ===
The Terminator: Endgame is a 3-issue comic book series published by Dark Horse Comics in 1992. It's by James Robinson and Jackson Guice.

1. (September 1992)
2. (October 1992)
3. (October 1992)
- TPB The Terminator: Endgame (January 1999)

=== RoboCop Versus The Terminator (1992) ===
RoboCop Versus The Terminator is a 4-issue comic book series published by Dark Horse Comics in 1992. It is a crossover with the RoboCop franchise. It's written by Frank Miller and illustrated by Walt Simonson.

1. (September 1992)
  - (Platinum Edition) (September 1992)
2. (October 1992)
3. (November 1992)
4. (December 1992)
- TPB RoboCop Versus The Terminator (1992)

=== The Terminator: Death Valley (1998) ===
Dark Horse reacquired the license for The Terminator in 1998. The Terminator Special is a one-shot written by Alan Grant and illustrated by Guy Davis. It was released in August 1998.

The Terminator: Death Valley is a 4-issue sequel to the one-shot which began release in September 1998. It was written by Alan Grant and illustrated by Steve Pugh.

The Special and Death Valley were released together in a 1999 trade paperback titled The Terminator: Death Valley.

- Special (August 1998)
1. (September 1998)
2. (October 1998)
3. (November 1998)
4. (December 1998)
- TPB The Terminator: Death Valley (October 1999)

=== The Terminator: The Dark Years (1999) ===
1. (August 1999)
2. (October 1999)
3. (November 1999)
4. (December 1999)
- TPB The Terminator: The Dark Years (September 1999)

=== Superman versus The Terminator: Death to the Future (1999–2000) ===
1. (December 1999)
2. (January 2000)
3. (February 2000)
4. (March 2000)
- TPB Superman vs. The Terminator: Death to the Future (November 2000)

=== Aliens versus Predator versus The Terminator (2000) ===
1. (April 2000)
2. (May 2000)
3. (June 2000)
4. (July 2000)
- TPB Aliens versus Predator versus The Terminator (March 2001)

=== The Terminator: Omnibus (2008) ===
1. Vol. 01 (February 2008)
2. Vol. 02 (March 2008)

=== The Terminator 2029 (2010) ===
1. (March 2010)
2. (April 2010)
3. (May 2010)

=== The Terminator 1984 (2010) ===
1. (September 2010)
2. (October 2010)
3. (November 2010)
- TPB The Terminator: 2029-1984 (June 2011)

=== Terminator Salvation: The Final Battle (2013–2014) ===
Terminator Salvation: The Final Battle is a 12-issue comic book series from Dark Horse Comics. It was written by J. Michael Straczynski and illustrated by Pete Woods. The story follows the events of the 2009 film Terminator Salvation. The series ran from December 2013 to November 2014.

The Final Battle received mixed reviews. Jesse Schedeen with IGN criticized the first issue for "[recycling] too many of the same old elements from the first three movies." while Doug Zawisza with CBR said that it "offers readers a reinvigorated take on a familiar concept and property." Lonnie Nadler with Bloody Disgusting called it an "enjoyable sci-fi adventure" that was "focusing on the wrong things."

1. (December 2013)
2. (January 2014)
3. (February 2014)
4. (March 2014)
5. (April 2014)
6. (May 2014)
7. (June 2014)
8. (July 2014)
9. (August 2014)
10. (September 2014)
11. (October 2014)
12. (November 2014)
- TPB #1 Terminator Salvation: The Final Battle Volume 1 (November 2014)
- TPB #2 Terminator Salvation: The Final Battle Volume 2 (April 2015)

=== The Terminator: Enemy of My Enemy (2014) ===
The Terminator: Enemy of My Enemy is a 6-issue comic book series from Dark Horse Comics. It was written by Dan Jolley and illustrated by Jamal Igle. It ran from February to October 2014.

1. (February 2014)
2. (March 2014)
3. (May 2014)
4. (July 2014)
5. (September 2014)
6. (October 2014)
- TPB The Terminator: Enemy of my Enemy (February 2015)

=== Terminator: Sector War (2018–2019) ===
Terminator: Sector War is a 4-issue comic book series from Dark Horse Comics. It was written by Brian Wood and illustrated by Jeff Stokely. It ran from August 2018 to May 2019.

1. (August 2018)
2. (September 2018)
3. (February 2019)
4. (May 2019)
- TPB Terminator: Sector War (August 2019)

=== Terminator: Resistance – Zero Day Exploit (2019) ===
Terminator: Resistance – Zero Day Exploit is a one-shot comic book released by Dark Horse Books, a division of Dark Horse Comics. It's a prequel tie-in to the 2019 game Terminator: Resistance. The comic book was initially available in Europe with physical purchases of the game, and it was later released digitally. The comic book was also included with the Terminator: Resistance Enhanced collector’s edition for the PS5.

1. (November 2019)

== Marvel Comics ==
=== Terminator 2: Judgement Day (1991) ===
1. Arrival Early (July 1991)
2. Escape Late (July 1991)
3. Departure (August 1991)

== Malibu Comics ==
=== Terminator 2: Cybernetic Dawn (1995–1996) ===
1. Lost & Found (November 1995)
2. Search Mode (December 1995)
3. Judgement Impaired (January 1996)
4. Genesis & Revelations (February 1996)

=== Terminator 2: Nuclear Twilight (1995–1996) ===
1. Warchild (November 1995)
2. Suicide Mission (December 1995)
3. Dead Men Walking (January 1996)
4. Father's Day (February 1996)
5. The Programming of Fate (April 1996)

== Beckett Comics ==
Beckett Comics' right to publish Terminator 3 comics was first announced in March 2003.

The first issue, Terminator 3: Before the Rise #1, is a prequel to the film Terminator 3: Rise of the Machines. It was written by Ivan Brandon, based on a story by Jeff Amano, and illustrated by Goran Parlov. It went on sale on June 18, 2003, before the film released on July 2.

Before the Rise was followed by Eyes of the Rise by writer Miles Gunter and artist Mike Hawthorne. They were followed by a third story, Fragmented. More stories were planned, but declining sales and Arnold Schwarzenegger going into politics led to the cancellation of the series.

Schwarzenegger personally approved everything with his likeness in the series.

=== Terminator 3: Rise of the Machines (2003) ===
1. Before the Rise Part One (July 2003)
2. Before the Rise Part Two (August 2003)
3. Eyes of the Rise Part One (September 2003)
4. Eyes of the Rise Part Two (October 2003)
5. Fragmented Part One (December 2003)
6. Fragmented Part Two (December 2003)

== Dynamite Entertainment ==
Dynamite Entertainment acquired the license for Terminator 2 comics in 2007.

Dynamite re-acquired the license for Terminator comics in 2024 for the 40th anniversary of the series. They released both new comics and collections of previously published comics.

=== Terminator: Infinity (2007) ===
Terminator 2: Infinity, later released as the collection Terminator: Infinity, is a 5-issue comic book series published by Dynamite Entertainment.

Richard George with IGN rated the first issue "Pass It" (2/5), calling it "a paint-by-the-numbers attempt to use the Terminator brand [that] doesn't add anything significant, original or interesting."

1. (July 2007)
  - (Cover B: Stjepan Šejić) (July 2007)
  - (Cover C: Nigel Raynor) (July 2007)
2. (August 2007)
  - (Cover B: Stjepan Sejic) (August 2007)
  - (Cover C: Nigel Raynor) (August 2007)
3. (September 2007)
  - (Cover B: Stjepan Sejic) (September 2007)
  - (Cover C: Nigel Raynor) (September 2007)
4. (October 2007)
  - (Cover B) (October 2007)
  - (Cover C) (October 2007)
5. (November 2007)
  - (Cover B) (November 2007)
  - (Cover C) (November 2007)
- TPB Terminator: Infinity Vol. 01 (July 2008)

=== Terminator 2 (2008) ===
1. Time To Kill, Episode Two of Four (January 2008)
  - (Cover B: 50% Painkiller Jane Cover) (January 2008)
2. Time To Kill, Episode Four of Four (March 2008)
  - (Cover B) (March 2008)

=== Terminator: Revolution (2009) ===
Terminator: Revolution is a 5-issue comic book series published by Dynamite Entertainment in 2009. It's written by Simon Furman and illustrated by Lui Antonio.

Ray Sidman with The Comics Buyer's Guide rated it 2.5 out of 5 stars.

1. (January 2009)
2. (February 2009)
  - (Cover B) (February 2009)
3. (February 2009)
4. (April 2009)
5. (May 2009)
- TPB Terminator: Revolution (August 2009)

=== Terminator/RoboCop: Kill Human (2011) ===
Terminator/RoboCop: Kill Human is a 4-issue comic book series from Dynamite Entertainment released in 2011.

After being activated by the last human on Earth, RoboCop tries to prevent the annihilation of humanity by time-traveling into the past.

1. (July 2011)
2. (August 2011)
3. (September 2011)
4. (October 2011)
- TPB Terminator/Robocop: Kill Human (April 2012)

=== The Terminator (2024–2025) ===
The Terminator from Dynamite Entertainment ran for 10 issues from October 2024 to August 2025. It was written by Declan Shalvey and illustrated by Luke Sparrow, David O'Sullivan, Joe Mulvey, and Colin Craker. The series was first announced in July 2024, and in August, Shalvey revealed that it was an anthology series.

Reviews were generally positive, averaging a critical score of 8.4/10 on Comic Book Roundup.

Issue	Published	Writer	Illustrator
#1	Oct 09, 2024	Declan Shalvey	Luke Sparrow
#2	Nov 13, 2024	Declan Shalvey	Luke Sparrow
#3	Dec 11, 2024	Declan Shalvey	Luke Sparrow
#4	Jan 22, 2025	Declan Shalvey	David O'Sullivan
#5	Mar 05, 2025	Declan Shalvey	Joe Mulvey
#6	Mar 26, 2025	Declan Shalvey	David O'Sullivan
#7	May 21, 2025	Declan Shalvey	David O'Sullivan
#8	Jun 04, 2025	Declan Shalvey	Colin Craker
#9	Jul 30, 2025	Declan Shalvey	Joe Mulvey
#10	Aug 20, 2025	Declan Shalvey	Luke Sparrow

- The Terminator Volume One: Out of Time (February 24, 2026)
  - Hardcover ISBN 978-1-5241-2762-6
  - TPB ISBN 978-1-5241-2761-9

=== The Terminator: Metal (2025–2026) ===
The Terminator: Metal is a 5-issue comic book series from Dynamite Entertainment that ran from October 2025 to February 2026. It was written by Declan Shalvey and Rory McConville, and illustrated by Lorenzo Re, Eoin Marron, Colin Craker, Giona Zefiro, and Luke Sparrow. The series consists of self-contained stories with an overarching theme.

Issue	Published	Writer	Illustrator
#1	Oct 22, 2025	Declan Shalvey, Rory McConville	Lorenzo Re
#2	Nov 19, 2025	Declan Shalvey, Rory McConville	Eoin Marron
#3	Dec 10, 2025	Declan Shalvey, Rory McConville	Colin Craker
#4	Jan 28, 2026	Declan Shalvey, Rory McConville	Giona Zefiro
#5	Feb 18, 2026	Declan Shalvey, Rory McConville	Luke Sparrow

=== The Terminator: Santa Claus is Coming to Town (2025) ===
The Terminator: Santa Claus is Coming to Town is a comic book from Dynamite Entertainment released on December 3, 2025. It was written by Paulina Ganucheau and illustrated by Kendall Goode.

=== Archie vs. The Terminator (2026) ===
Archie vs. The Terminator is a 4-issue comic book series from Dynamite Entertainment. It was first released on October 14, 2026.

Issue	Published	Writer	Illustrator
#1	Oct 14, 2026	Rory McConville	Steven Butler, Lily Butler
#2	upcoming	Rory McConville	Steven Butler, Lily Butler
#3	upcoming	Rory McConville	Steven Butler, Lily Butler
#4	upcoming	Rory McConville	Steven Butler, Lily Butler

== IDW Publishing ==
=== Terminator Salvation: Movie Prequel (2009) ===
1. Sand in the Gears (February 2009)
  - (Incentive Variant) (February 2009)
2. Sand in the Gears, Part 2 (February 2009)
  - (Retailer Incentive Variant Cover Edition) (March 2009)
3. Sand in the Gears, Part 3 (March 2009)
  - (Retailer Incentive Variant Cover Edition) (March 2009)
4. Sand in the Gears, Part 4 (March 2009)
- TPB Terminator: Salvation Movie Prequel (May 2009)

All four parts of the movie prequel were re-printed in the UK comic Terminator Salvation Comic, published by Titan Magazines.

=== Terminator Salvation: Official Movie Preview (2009) ===
1. (April 2009)

=== Transformers vs. The Terminator (2020) ===
Transformers vs. The Terminator is a 4-issue comic book series published by IDW Publishing in collaboration with Dark Horse Comics. It ran from March to September 2020.

1. Enemy of My Enemy Part 01 (March 2020)
2. Enemy of My Enemy Part 02 (June 2020)
3. Enemy of My Enemy Part 03 (August 2020)
4. Enemy of My Enemy Part 04 (September 2020)
- TPB Transformers vs. The Terminator (November 2020)
