= Batmania =

Term in DC comics

Batmania is a term coined by Billy Joe (Biljo) White in the early 1960s and the title of his influential fanzine dedicated to the DC comic book character Batman. The name is "almost certainly" a nod to the then-prominent term "Beatlemania" used to describe the impact of the Beatles in popular culture. When White first published Batmania, interest in the Batman character was at a low point; however, due to changes credited largely to DC editor Julie Schwartz, comic sales improved and the character built a wave of popularity that led to the 1966 Batman television series. White and his fanzine were credited with helping to focus the energy of the dedicated fans during this time.

The term "Batmania" was used extensively — and without apparent awareness of White's publication — in the popular press to describe the high level of interest surrounding the premiere of the 1960s TV Show and was revived in media references to levels of interest displayed around the premiere of the 1989 Batman film (e.g., People Magazine, July 1989). The term has become a colloquialism used to describe fan interest in Batman and merchandise associated with the character.

In addition to White's fanzine, the Batmania title has specifically been used as the name of several books written by James Van Hise on the history of the Batman character and associated merchandise, a series of documentaries about the 1960s Batman TV series, an album of music "Inspired By The Batman TV Series" released in 1997, and assorted other Batman-related media projects.

== Fanzine ==
Batmania (later Beyond the Clock)
- Editor: Biljo White (1964–1967); Rich Morrissey (1967–1978)
- Categories: history, criticism, interviews
- Total circulation: 1,000 (1967)
- First issue: July 1964; 62 years ago
- Final issue Number: 1978; 23
- Country: United States
- Based in: Columbia, Missouri
- Language: English

=== Publication history ===
First published in July 1964, Batmania was a comics fanzine published by Billy Joe "Biljo" White, produced for "Batmanians" as the unofficial "fanzine for Batman fans." Appearing under the motto "For Batman, we accept nothing as impossible," White's fanzine was released a year after sales on the two Batman titles – Batman and Detective Comics (DC Comics) – had "dipped alarmingly." With editor Julius Schwartz replacing Jack Schiff, and "assign[ing] his favorite writer, John Broome, to raise the level of the stories, and his most popular artist, Carmine Infantino, to upgrade the visuals," White's fanzine helped revive interest in the character. Schwartz returned the character to his roots, removing much of the "gimmickry" and members of the then so-called Bat-family – Batwoman, Batgirl (Betty Kane), Ace the Bathound and Bat-Mite in particular – for a "new look" debut of mid-1964 with Detective Comics #327 (May 1964) and Batman #164 (June 1964), a mere matter of months before White's fanzine debuted.

The title – "no doubt inspired by the Beatlemania that had swept the U.S. earlier in the year" – released by long-term Batman fan and firefighter White from his home in Columbia, Missouri, swiftly became one of comics fandom's most important fanzines. White was himself an "aspiring artist showing considerable potential," who had once written to Batman-creator Bob Kane and produced a regular cartoon during World War II called "The New Bunch." Involved in comics fandom from its earliest days, White contributed to issues of Komix Illustrated, Masquerader, Star-Studded Comics and Alter Ego (A/E), among others. (When Roy Thomas took over A/E, White "served as art editor".)

Batmania had the tacit approval of DC, after White sent a copy of his first issue to renowned fan-friendly editor Julius Schwartz, who liked it, and even gave it a plug in the pages of Batman #169, causing the membership of the fledgling "Batmanians" group to grow "nearly 1,000-strong". The first issue, published in 1964, was in such demand that White:

"kept printing up more and more copies, until the ditto masters gave out – and I still couldn't satisfy all the requests. It convinced me more than ever that there was a large body of fans who enjoyed the adventures of Batman and Robin as much as I did."

=== Content ===
The pages of the fanzine provided, wrote fan historian Bill Schelly for Roy Thomas' Alter Ego revival from TwoMorrows Publishing:

"features which both entertained and educated readers on aspects of the Dynamic Duo's career in the late 1930s. (The 25 annuals and giants of the 1960s generally reached only a few years into Batman's past for their reprints.) Beginning in issue #2, the first of two landmark articles called "Batman before Robin" appeared, recounting what Batman was like in the year before he adopted Dick Grayson as his ward."

As the 1960s reprints of Golden Age Batman stories did not stretch back to his very beginnings, these articles were crucial in educating new Batman fans about the history of the character — including his (short-lived) early tendencies to both use a gun and kill various of his foes. Batmania also provided a forum for fans to hold forth on topics related to the character in a section called "The Batmanians Speak." Fan Richard Kyle, who coined the phrase "graphic story"/"graphic novel" was one who debated the pros and cons of the "new look" (including the iconic yellow-encircled Bat logo on the costume's chest), alongside key fellow fandom individuals such as Ron Foss - and in the first annual Batmania poll, 90% of respondents said that they preferred the new look.

Batmania also included advertisements and checklists, occasional non-Batman features, and revealed to fandom the existence of Rutland, Vermont's Halloween Parade, which Tom Fagan led in Batman-garb; the parade — and Fagan — would later feature in several in-comics storylines, most notably in those written by long-term fan Roy Thomas.

=== Batman creation controversy ===
Schelly writes that one "key reason for the formation of comics fandom was to provide collectors with data about their favorite comic books. Who were the artists? The writers? For the most part, no one knew, until the information was gradually ferreted out by tenacious fans." Bill Finger's rare appearance at the 1965 New York Comicon began to shed light on his immense contributions to the character of Batman, and his role in scripting – and co-creating – most of the key aspects of the strip, including the character itself. This appearance led Jerry Bails to write in CAPA-alpha #12 (Sep 1965) about "The Silent Legend Behind the Batman!", namely Finger. Describing Kane's hiring of Finger and likely becoming the first source to state that Finger "put words in the mouth of the Guardian of Gotham," Bails attributed the status of co-creator of Batman to Finger. This led to a "lengthy retort" from Bob Kane himself appearing in the Batmania fanzine, "written just days after seeing the Bails piece," but unprinted until the 1967 Batmania Annual (issue #17), publication delayed because Finger had communicated to Tom Fagan that he and Kane were intending to talk things through prior to the letter's publication.

==== Bob Kane's creation assertion ====
Kane's 6-page letter (reprinted by Roy Thomas in the pages of Alter Ego, as published by TwoMorrows Publishing) was written on September 14, 1965, and after congratulating White on Batmania aims to rebut the various "myths" surrounding the creation of Batman. Opening his attempts to "explode the myths" about the creation of Batman, Kane writes:

"I, Bob Kane, am the sole creator of "Batman." I created "Batman" in 1939 . . . and I signed the first strip.."

The letter sparked a debate among comics fandom over the contributions made by Kane, Finger and Jerry Robinson (among others), a debate that continues to the present day. The letter itself, while much less charitable towards Finger than Kane would later be, appears carefully worded to rebut "the impression that he [Finger] and not myself [Kane] created the "Batman," as well as Robin[, etc.]" rather than to address Bails' issue of co-creatorship. Part of Kane's logic hinges on Finger's signature/by-line not appearing on the strip, even though such anonymity and relinquishing of credit was commonplace in the comics industry of the 1930s and 1940s. Kane further threatens legal action against Jerry Bails, asserting that, while Finger "was influential . . . in shaping up the strip", the idea was conceived solely by him prior to bringing Finger in to script the work, and therefore was created solely by him. Batmania – and other forums – have since debated whether the "influential" assistance of Finger was deserving of more credit than Kane was – at the time – willing to apportion him.

=== TV News ===
Batmania was perfectly poised to receive the news in 1965 that a television series was being produced about Batman, and "January 12th, 1966, fans across the country gathered at their TVs" to watch the first episode of the Adam West and Burt Ward-starring Batman series. Soon after:

BIFF! POW! ZAP! began appearing in media headlines, and the Batman craze was upon us. The TV and print news media were abruptly afloat with the word "Batmania," which they doubtless believed they had coined. Sales of the Caped Crusader's comics spiked. (Batman even outsold Superman for a while, something it wouldn't do again until the 1990s.) Just as suddenly, the Bat-craze sent the circulation of Biljo White's Batmania into the stratosphere. Having begun with a respectable print run of 300 copies, it had burgeoned to over 750 by mid-1966 and showed no signs of abating.

=== Circulation ===
Batmania eventually rose to a circulation of c. 1000 copies, all produced on a mimeograph machine by White, and purchased by Batmanians from all over the world "in such Far Eastern countries as Australia, Thailand, and India, through England and Italy and so on," while "Batmania material... [was] reprinted in both England and Italy."

After "the 1967 Batmania Annual (#17), White ceased publication to take a well-deserved break," although the fanzine and name did not cease. Moving "from mimeograph to professional photo-offset printing," it was continued by Rich Morrissey for a further six issues until 1978, before DC "withdrew its permission to use the title," whereupon "it ran still more issues under the name Behind the Clock (sic), an allusion to the entrance to the Batcave." Beyond the Clock was edited by J. R. Sams, and co-edited by Morrissey.

=== Legacy ===
With Batmanias's first issue cited by "the father of comics fandom" Jerry Bails as one of the "major events" in comics fandom, Schelly concurred 30+ years later, writing that:

White had done his job well. His magazine had focused the energy of fans of the Caped Crusader at a time when he was at an all-time low, and rallied support for Julius Schwartz' successful effort to resuscitate the strip. By the time the TV show had run its course, the Batman of the comic books had found new life, and soon would benefit by a further re-tooling. The era of Denny O'Neil and Neal Adams brought a welcome return to the days of Batman as an eerie creature of the night, very much as he had been originally envisioned by Bob Kane.

== Books ==
The title Batmania was used in the late 1980s and early 1990s in a series of three books written by James Van Hise which detailed the history of the Batman character.

The first volume was released in 1989 to tie-in with the release of Tim Burton's Batman film, and featured interviews, articles about the then-upcoming revival/reunion of the 1966 Batman TV series cast in syndication repeats and newly filmed material, articles on the Batmobile and pages on various Batman-related collectibles. It was edited by Hal Schuster (formerly of New Media Publishing), as one of many books published by him on popular culture under various book imprints.

A second volume followed three years later, just prior to the release of Batman Returns, similarly featuring articles and interviews, as well as details on the Batman serials of the 1940s, the comics, the TV series and the 1989 film.

A third volume, collecting material from the first two books, was published in 1995.

- Batmania (Pioneer Books, Inc., 1989) ISBN 1-55698-252-6
- Batmania II (Pioneer Books, Inc., 1992) ISBN 1-55698-315-8
- Batmania III (Pioneer Books, Inc., 1995) ISBN 9781556983825

== Documentaries ==
The late-1980s/early 1990s revivals/reunions of cast members from the 1966 Batman TV series (itself in large part inspired by the big screen reappearance of the caped crusader in Tim Burton's 1989 film) spawned several documentaries, two of which were released on VHS using variations of the series' "Holy" catchphrase and the term "Batmania". These served both as retrospectives on Batman (and mostly the TV series) as well as acting as trailers for the upcoming films.

A separate "Batmania"-entitled VHS documentary was released by Anchor Bay in September, 1989 for much the same purpose.

"Batmania" entitled VHS releases include:

- Batmania from comics to screen: The real story of the super hero (Anchor Bay, Sep 1989, directed by James Gordon)
- Holy Batmania! (United American Video, Nov 1989)
- Holy Batmania 2! (United American Video, 1992)

In 2004, Image Entertainment released a DVD entitled Holy Batmania!, which included four documentaries: on the 1966 show, on Adam West, on Cesar Romero and on Julie Newmar. Culled largely from the earlier VHS releases (minus material retrospectively having clearance problems — most notably that featuring Yvonne Craig's Batgirl character), the re-release was designed in part to tie-into the hype and Bat-releases surrounding the then-upcoming Batman Begins movie.

== Album ==
In July 1997, in part to tie in with the theatrical release of the live-action Batman and Robin film, and in part the debut of The New Batman/Superman Adventures TV series, Varèse Sarabande released an album entitled Batmania, featuring "Songs Inspired By The Batman TV Series," consisting in large part of songs by various cast members. Burt Ward's "Boy Wonder, I Love You" (a collaboration with Frank Zappa) was notable by its absence.

=== Track listing ===
1. "Batman Theme" – Neal Hefti
2. "The Story Of Batman" – Adam West
3. "The Capture" – Burgess Meredith
4. "Batman To The Rescue" – LaVern Baker
5. "Batman Theme" – Al Hirt
6. "Ratman And Bobin In The Clipper Caper" – The Brothers Four
7. "Batman A Go Go" – Combo Kings
8. "Miranda" – Adam West
9. "That Man" – Peggy Lee
10. "Batman Theme" – Davie Allan & The Arrows
11. "The Joker Is Wild" – Jan & Dean
12. "The Riddler" – Frank Gorshin
13. "The Escape" – Burgess Meredith
14. "Batman And Robin" – Adam West
15. "Batman Theme" – Joel McNeely/Royal Scottish National Orchestra and Chorus
