= Chris Bunting =

British comic book writer

- Area: Writer
- Notable works: Action Man; Mr. T

Chris Bunting is a British comic book writer.

== Biography ==
Bunting's first professional comic book work was printed in Antarctic Press's Shoujo #4 in 2005. After that he released the book How to Break into Comics, also published by Antarctic Press.

Bunting then went on to spearhead the Mr. T comic series, based on the character of that name in the A-Team television series, which was published by AP Comics, a UK small press publisher. He was instrumental in securing the license and wrote and edited the series. Only two issues were released before the publisher closed, however, resulting in Bunting and the comic transferring to another publisher, who printed the final issue in the comic series.

From 2005-2006, Bunting scripted the Action Man comic for Panini Comics UK based on the iconic action figure. Along with the current cast of characters, Bunting also brought back long forgotten characters like villain Anti Freeze, and even showed Action Man’s base for the first time, complete with accessories, weapons and other long forgotten character, Raid.

Bunting has also scripted many other comics, including a story that appeared in the small press section of Judge Dredd Megazine.

Bunting has also done regular feature writing for the likes of Toxic magazine and Comics International.

In February 2008 publisher Mohawk Media released an all-new Mr. T graphic novel. Entitled Mr. T: Limited Advance Edition Graphic Novel it was limited to 4,000 copies. The regular worldwide edition of the Mr. T graphic novel was released in December 2008. Bunting authored both editions. Later that same month, Mohawk Media announced a range of merchandising based on the Mr. T graphic novel. Bunting also acted as Design and Creative Director for both the products and graphic novels.
