= The Real Ghostbusters (comics) =

1998 ongoing comic series

- Issue 1 of NOW Comics The Real Ghostbusters

Publication information
- Publisher: Marvel UK; NOW Comics
- Schedule: Marvel UK: Weekly/Monthly; NOW: Monthly
- Format: Ongoing series
- Publication date: Marvel UK: March 1988 - March 1992; NOW: August 1988 - December 1990; October 1991 - December 1992
- No. of issues: Marvel UK: 193; NOW: 28/4
- Main character: Ghostbusters

Creative team
- Written by: Dan Abnett; Andy Lanning; John Freeman; John Carnell; James Van Hise
- Artist(s): Anthony Williams; Brian Williamson; John Tobias; Evan Dorkin; Phillip Hester

Collected editions
- A Hard Day's Fright: ISBN 1-84576-140-5
- Who You Gonna Call?: ISBN 1-84576-141-3
- Which Witch Is Which?: ISBN 1-84576-142-1
- This Ghost Is Toast!: ISBN 1-84576-143-X

The Real Ghostbusters is a comic series spun off from The Real Ghostbusters animated series. Versions were published by Marvel UK and NOW Comics. Publication of the series began on March 28, 1988.

== Publication history ==
=== NOW Comics ===
NOW Comics began publishing the series in August 1988. The series ran for two volumes, two annuals and one special. The first volume ran for twenty-eight issues. The series was primarily written by James Van Hise, with the exceptions being issue #4 by La Morris Richmond, and issue #21 which featured Marvel UK reprints due to production delays. John Tobias, Phillip Hester, Evan Dorkin and Howard Bender were among the pencilers for the series.

The series went on hiatus for a time due to the publisher's financial difficulties, but was subsequently re-launched. The second volume ran for four issues, one special (The Real Ghostbusters Spectacular 3-D Special) and two annuals (one regular and one 3-D). The series had a main story that ran from the 3-D Special through issue 4, followed by back-up stories reprinted from the Marvel UK run. They also contained game pages and health tips for kids and parents. Several issues of volume 1 and the main issues of volume 2 used covers taken from the Marvel UK run.

NOW Comics also published a three issue miniseries in 1989 called Real Ghostbusters Starring in Ghostbusters II that was collected as a trade paperback.

=== Marvel UK ===
Marvel UK published a magazine-sized comic for 193 issues that also spawned 4 annuals and 10 specials. The series started its run on March 28, 1988. Each issue contained three to four comic stories, a prose story alternating from a regular tale to one narrated by Winston Zeddemore, a prose entry of Egon Spengler’s Spirit Guide typically discussing the entities in the comic, a bio of a character or ghost that appeared in the series, and a short Slimer strip. The comics featured a rotating line-up of creators, including John Carnell, Dan Abnett, Andy Lanning, Brian Williamson, Anthony Williams, Stuart Place, Richard Starkings, and Helen Stone.

The series ran weekly and eventually began to feature reprints from the American comics as well as stories that appeared previously in the series. The American comics were often broken up into four to five parts, and incorporated the failed Slimer! series beginning with issue 121. The last original story ran in issue 171 with the remaining issues being reprints from the earlier comics and the American books.

Four annual comics were produced in a hardcover format. Each book contained several comic strips, full-page Slimer strips, and prose stories. The books also included game and activity pages, and reprints of bios found in the regular books.

Some of these issues were collected by Titan Books into trade paperbacks. These include:

- A Hard Day's Fright (collects The Real Ghostbusters #1-7, 9, 11, 19, 50 and 99, 96 pages, October 2005, Titan Books, ISBN 1-84576-140-5)
- Who You Gonna Call? (collects The Real Ghostbusters #12, 16, 19, 24, 33, 48, 52 and 53, 1989 Annual, 1990 Annual, 1992 Annual, 96 pages, April 2006, Titan Books, ISBN 1-84576-141-3)
- Which Witch Is Which? (96 pages, July 2006, Titan Books, ISBN 1-84576-142-1)
- This Ghost Is Toast! (96 pages, November 2006, Titan Books, ISBN 1-84576-143-X)

Marvel UK also reprinted NOW Comics' tradepaperback Real Ghostbusters Starring in Ghostbusters II in 1989 as well as reprinting various issues as a compendium called The Real Ghostbusters: The Giggling Ghoul and Other Stories also in 1989.

Outside of the ongoing title, the Ghostbusters were also featured in the 30 issue run of The Marvel Bumper Comic. An anthology style comic that was published by Marvel UK from 1988–1989, and that featured strips based on different characters and properties.

"Slimer" by NOW Comics

== Slimer ==
A spinoff series that spotlighted the popular Ghostbusters character Slimer was also published. NOW Comics published a series that ran nineteen issues from 1989 through 1990, as well as spawning a one shot special called The Real Ghostbusters 3-D Slimer Special. Some of these issues were reprinted as a tradepaperback in 1991.

Marvel UK also published a 19-issue series.

== Titles ==
=== NOW Titles ===
- The Real Ghostbusters Volume 1 #1-28
- The Real Ghostbusters Volume 2 #1-4
- The Real Ghostbusters 1992 Annual
- The Real Ghostbusters 1993 Annual
- The Real Ghostbusters starring in Ghostbusters II #1-3
- The Real Ghostbusters Spectacular 3-D Special
- The Real Ghostbusters 3-D Slimer Special
- Slimer #1-19

=== Marvel UK ===
- The Real Ghostbusters #1-193, 1989-92 Annual

== See also ==
- List of comics based on television programs
