= The Master Landscapist =

- Story code: D 90057
- Story: Don Rosa
- Ink: Don Rosa
- Hero: Donald Duck
- Pages: 10
- Layout: 4 rows per page
- Appearances: Donald Duck; Huey, Dewey and Louie
- First publication: November 12, 1990

"The Master Landscapist" is a 1990 Donald Duck story by Don Rosa, first published in Sweden in Kalle Anka & C:o #1990-46. It is the first story Don Rosa did for Egmont. The first American publication was in Donald Duck Adventures (series II) #22, in March 1992.

== Plot ==
Donald Duck has started a gardening and landscaping business. The mayor of Duckburg has hired him to take care of his garden so that he can hold a garden party for Duckburg's elite.

Donald and his nephews arrive at the mayor's mansion where they are greeted by the mayor, his wife, and their large tomcat. Donald sets to work, with perfect finesse and attention to detail: for example, he mows the lawn in front of the stables with a group of trained rabbits, shaves the garden trees to perfect spheres, and makes a sculpture from a large bush.

However, when Donald tries to mow the main lawn with two lawnmowers at once, he accidentally sets them into full speed, losing control of them. This causes a sequence of increasingly catastrophic incidents, during which the mayor's garden is totally destroyed, ending up looking like a battle site. The story ends with Donald hiding from the mayor and his wife, who are looking to punish Donald for the damages.
