= Ron Fortier =

American author

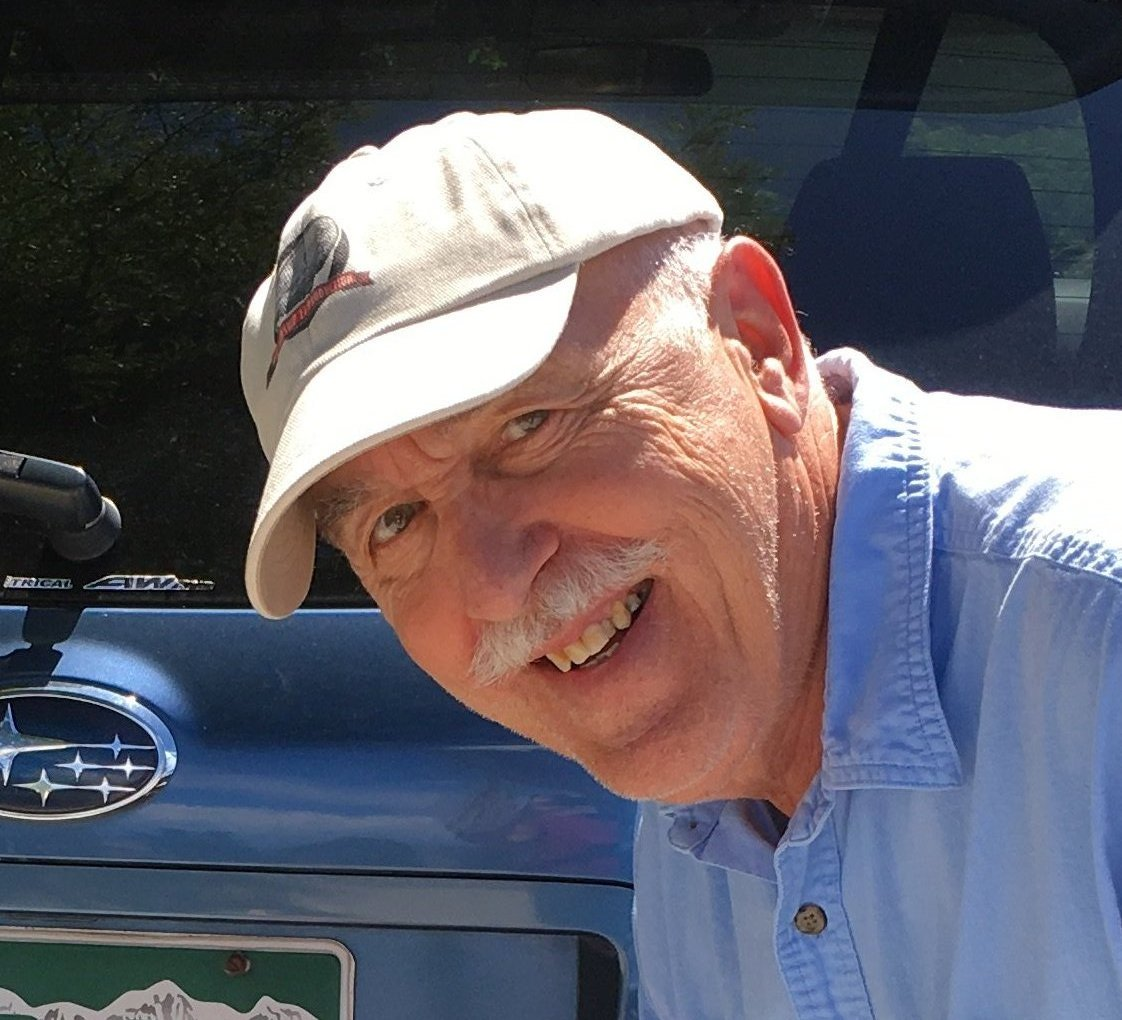

Ron Fortier (born November 5, 1946) is an American author, primarily known for his Green Hornet and The Terminator comic books and his revival of the pulp hero Captain Hazzard. Early in his career he also wrote short stories and co-authored two novels for TSR.

== Life and career ==
Fortier grew up in New Hampshire and now resides in Colorado. He graduated from St. Thomas Aquinas High School, in Dover. He served in the U.S. Army between 1965 and 1968 and is a Vietnam veteran. Upon his discharge, he attended the Southern New Hampshire University earning a BS degree in Business Administration. During his comics career, he wrote many series for Now Comics, including the best selling Green Hornet series done with artist Jeff Butler and Terminator Burning Earth, with Alex Ross. He later adapted a Gene Roddenberry's Lost Universe for Tekno Comix, and wrote an Incredible Hulk Annual.

Following his work on comic books, he returned to longer fiction with a series of pulp fiction novels, short stories, and a 2001 play. In 2006, along with artist Rob Davis, he started Airship 27 Productions, a production company devoted to publishing new adventures of classic pulp heroes. The company first worked with Wild Cat Books but in 2007 they partnered with Cornerstone Book Publishers of New Orleans. Also in 2007 Fortier created pulp SF revival character "Mars McCoy." In 2011 Fortier and Airship 27 ended their partnership with Cornerstone and began publishing their books under their own Airship 27 Productions imprint. Fortier writes new Captain Hazzard novels based on a classic one-shot magazine from 1938 and created the new pulp character, Brother Bones; the Undead Avenger.

At the same time they started Redbud Studio to publish their own comics via the on-demand printing company, KaBlam. Redbud Studios publishes Fortier's comedy super-hero series, Mr. Jigsaw Man of a Thousand Parts illustrated by Gary Kato and edited by Rob Davis.

In 2011, Twilight Star Studio and Redbud Studio Comics began publishing Ron Fortier's Tales of the Macabre, a series of horror short stories written by Fortier and illustrated by comics industry up-and-coming artists. There have been six volumes to date including a collected edition.

In 2017 Fortier was the recipient of the Pulp Factory's first Pulp Grand Master Award.

Fortier has also co-written three novels with the late science fiction author Ardath Mayhar. He currently teaches a class in How To Write Comics & Graphic Novels at the Front Range Community College in Fort Collins, CO.

== Bibliography ==
Comics

- Charlton Bullseye #3 Charlton Comics (1981)
- Scare Tales # 38 Charlton Comics (1982) Debut of Mr.Jigsaw
- Street Fighter, Ocean Comics, #1-4 (1985)
- Popeye: Born to the Sea, Ocean Comics, # 1 (Summer 1987)
- Mr. Jigsaw One Shot Special, Ocean Comics (Fall 1987)
- Popeye: Double Trouble Down Under #2 (Winter 1987)
- Tales of Terror, Eclipse Comics, #13 (July 1987)
- Kull in 3-D, Blackthorne Publishing (1988)
- Rambo, Blackthorne Publishing, #1 (Feb. 1989)
- The Green Hornet, NOW Comics, Vol. 1, #1–12 (Nov. 1989 – Oct. 1990)
- The Terminator, NOW Comics, #9–17 (Dec. 1989)
- Terminator: The Burning Earth, NOW Comics, #1–5 (Mar. – July 1990)
- Boston Bombers, Caliber Comics, #1–2 (1990)
- Caliber Presents, Caliber Comics, #12 (June 1990)
- Within Our Reach, Star Reach Productions, original graphic novel (1991)
- Peter Pan: Return to Never-Never Land, Adventure Comics, #1–2 (July 1991)
- Sting of The Green Hornet, NOW Comics, #1–4 (June – Sep. 1992)
- The Green Hornet, NOW Comics, Vol. 2, #12–18, 21 (Aug. – Dec. 1992)
- The Incredible Hulk, Marvel Comics, Annual 19 (1993)
- Megaton Holiday Special, Entity Comics, #1 (1993)
- The Original Street Fighter, Alpha Comics, #1 (1995)
- Gene Roddenberry's Lost Universe, Tekno Comix, #2–7 (May – Oct. 1995)
- Gene Roddenberry's Xander in Lost Universe, Tekno Comix, #0–8 (Nov. 1995 – May 1996)
- Neil Gaiman's Phage: Shadow Death, Tekno Comix, #1 (June 1996)
- Boston Bombers Special, Caliber Comics, #1 (1997)
- Cavewoman: Odyssey, Caliber Comics, #1 (1999)
- Frank Frazetta Fantasy Illustrated: "Om", Quantum Cat Entertainment, #7 (July 1999)
- Temple and Nash: The Cockroach Conspiracy, League Entertainment (2004)
- Frank Ng-Hired Gun, Crusade Entertainment (2006)
- Daughter of Dracula, Redbud Studio (2007), Wild Wolf Entertainment LLC (2009)
- Brother Bones-Bullets of Jade, Redbud Studio (2008)
- Real Magicalism edited by James Burns, Demon Press (2008)
- Mr.Jigsaw Man of a Thousand Parts #1 Redbud Studio (2009)
- The Boston Bombers Graphic Novel Collection Redbud Studio (2010)
- Price For the Asking # 1 Redbud Studio (2010)
- Price For the Asking # 2 Redbud Studio (2010)
- Ron Fortier's Tales of the Macabre Redbud Studio (2010)
- Paradise Falls #1 Redbud Studio (2014)
- Price For the Asking # 3 Redbud Studio (2015)
- Paradise Falls # 2 Redbud Studio
- Beetle Girl #15 "The Art Heist" Lucky Comics (2017)
- Major Liberty # 1 Lucky Comics (2017)
- Secret Agent X - Redbud Studio (2017)
- Paradise Falls # 3 Redbud Studio (2019)
- Mr.Jigsaw Full Color Christmas Special (2019)
- Paradise Falls Collection (2020)
- Mr.Jigsaw Man of a Thousand Parts # 16 Redbud Studio (2021)
- The Wooden Blade # 1Pulp Fusion (2021)
- The Black Lion graphic novel (2021)
- Mr.Jigsaw Man of a Thousand Parts # 17 Redbud Studio (2022)
- The Wooden Blade # 2 Pulp Fusion (2022)
- Beyond the Stars # 1 Silverline Comics (2022)
- Beyond the Stars # 2 Silverline Comics (2023)
- The Boston Bombers Vol 2 # 1 - Redbud Studio

8 Mr.Jigsaw Man of a Thousand Parts # 18 Redbud Studio (2023)

- Satin's Ways - Graphic Novel - Redbud Studio (2023)
- Peter Pan: Return to Never Never Land - Graphic Novel - Redbud Studio (2023)
- Wooden Blade # 3 Pulp Fusion (2024)
- Beyond the Stars # 3 Silverline Comics (2024)
- The Boston Bombers Vol 2 # 2 - Redbud Studio (2024)
- Jin & Tonik # 1 - El Gaupo Comics (2024)
- The Crimson Nun - Rebellion # 1 - Antarctic Press (2024)
- Beyond the Stars # 4 Silverline Comics (2024)
- The Adventures of Captain Jain Marlee - Space Smuggler - Redbud Studio (2024)
- The Boston Bombers Vol 2 # 3 - Redbud Studio (2025)
- The Crimson Nun - Rebellion # 2 - Antarctic Press (2026)
- Beyond the Stars # 5 Silverline Comics (2026)
- Brother Bones Origin Graphic Novel Part One - Self-published (2026)

Short stories

- "The Raid on Tauron IV" (1974)
- "The Hero-Maker" (1974)
- "The Bride of Balan" (1981) with Glenn Arthur Rahman
- "Skeleton in the Closet" (1985) with Kevin J. Anderson
- "Fury in Vermont" Dark Furies - Die Monster Books (2005)
- "The Fastest Runner" The Phantom Chronicles Moonstone Books
- "Last Day On The Job" Bad Cop-No Donut - Padwolf Publishing (2010)
- "Bloom of Death" I.V. Frost - Moonstone Books - (2010)
- "Blood Feud," Battling Boxing Stories - Borgo Pres (2012)
- "The Hot Dog Kid," Final Fenway Fiction - Cornerstone Books (2012)
- "Lawman," Black Pulp - Pro Se Press (2013)
- "Red Blizzard" Pride of the Mohicans - White Rocket Books (2014)
- "Claws of the Cat," Domino Lady - Sex As a Weapon Moonstone Books
- "The Yellow Dog," How The West Was Weird Vol 2 Word Press
- "The Invisible Gang," Spider Chronicles Moonstone Books
- "Spider Trap," Spider Extreme Prejudice Moonstone Books
- "The Ghoul," Monster Hungers - Pro Se Productions
- "Justice Is Mine," Justice Incl. Moonstone Books.
- "Jazzy" Occult Detectives Vol 1 - Airship 27 Productions.(2014)
- "Tony Quinn for the Defense" The Black Bat Returns - Moonstone books (2015)
- "The Dessert Contest," Sinbad The New Adv. Vol 5 Airship 27 Productions. (2016)
- "The Long Kill" The Ruby Files Vol.2 - Airship 27 Productions (2017)
- "The Austrian Prisoner," Athena Voltaire Pulp Tales - Action Labs (2017)
- "The Locked Cell Murder," Sherlock Holmes and Doctor Was Not - IFWG Pubs (2019)
- "The Alluring Miss Chandler Affair," Yours Truly, Johnny Dollar - Moonstone Books (2019)
- "The Last Trail, a Bass Reeves Story" Standoff - Cops and Robbers - Pro Se Press (2022)
- "The Road to Penance" Zorro-Zorro's Exploits - Bold Venture (2022)
- "The Deputy" Six Gun Red - Worlds of Pulp
- "Worlds of Wonder" Dracula Unfanged - IFWG Publishing (2022)
- "Going Into Business" The Blood Run Deep - Valhalla Books (2024)
- "The Lost Jungle" CNI - Classified Vol 4 - Blue Planet Press (2025)

Plays

- Where Loves Takes You (2001)

Novels

- Trail of the Seahawks, TSR, ISBN 0-88038-463-8 (June 1987) with Ardath Mayhar
- Monkey Station, Wizards of the Coast, ISBN 0-88038-743-2 (July 1989) with Ardath Mayhar
- The Hounds of Hell, Wild Cat Books, ISBN 1-4116-3166-8 (May 2005) with Gordon Linzner
- Captain Hazzard: Python Men of the Lost City, Wild Cat Books, ISBN 1-4116-9092-3 (Apr. 2006) with Chester Hawks (rewrite of first Captain Hazzard story)
- Captain Hazzard: The Citadel of Fear, Wild Cat Books, ISBN 1-4303-0189-9 (Nov. 2006) with Martin Powell
- Witchfire, Cornerstone Book Publishers, ISBN 1-887560-81-5 (Sep. 2007) with Ardath Mayhar
- "Ghost Squad - Rise of the Black Legion," with Andrew Salmon - Airship 27 Productions.
- Brother Bones, Cornerstone Book Publishers, ISBN 1-887560-91-2 (Jan. 2008) with Rob Davis
- Captain Hazzard: Curse of the Red Maggot, Cornerstone Book Publishers, ISBN 978-1-887560-94-8 (Feb.2008) with Chester Hawks (rewrite of second Captain Hazzard story)
- Captain Hazzard: Cavemen of New York Cornerstone Book Publishers, ISBN 978-1-934935-12-5 (April 2008)
- "Brother Bones - Tapestry of Blood," Airship 27 Productions
- "Captain Hazzard:Custer's Ghost," Airship 27 Productions
- "Brother Bones - City of Lost Souls," Airship 27 Productions.
- "Mark Justice's The Dead Sheriff # 3 Cannibals & Vampires" with Mark Justice - Airship 27 Productions (2018)
- "My Life in Comics - A Memoir" - Airship 27 Productions (2019)
- "Cape Noire - A Beast & Beauty Tale" - Airship 27 Productions (2022)

Contributor

- Lance Star: Sky Ranger, Wild Cat Books, ISBN 0-615-13478-5 (Nov. 2006), editor and afterword
- The Spider Chronicles, Moonstone, ISBN 1-933076-18-6 (Apr. 2007), short story
- The Phantom Chronicles, Moonstone, ISBN 1-933076-21-6 (Sep. 2007), short story
- Domino Lady: Sex As A Weapon, Moonstone, ISBN 1-933076-34-8 (Apr. 2008), short story
- Sentinels: Alternate Visions, White Rocket Books, ISBN 978-0-578-01120-2 (Feb. 2009), short story

== See also ==
- Ardath Mayhar
- Green Hornet
- Captain Hazzard
- Popeye
