= Mr. T (comics) =

Number of comic books

- Cover of the 2008 Mr. T graphic novel.

Publication information
- Publisher: NOW Comics; APComics
- Schedule: Monthly
- Format: Ongoing series
- Genre: Science fiction

American actor Mr. T has headlined in a number of comic books both under his own stage name and in conjunction with his role on the TV series The A-Team.

== Comics ==
=== Mr. T and the T-Force ===
Mr. T and the T-Force was released in 1993 by NOW Comics. It was written by Pete Stone with art by Neal Adams and then various creative teams following their run.

The series lasted 10 consecutive issues, not including a 1994 annual and various editions of #1, before closing when NOW Comics went out of business. This figure may be incorrect however, with the eleventh issue possibly being the final issue produced.

Many, if not all, issues of Mr. T and the T-Force included Mr. T trading cards.

=== Mr. T ===
Another comic version, Mr. T, appeared in 2005 from short-lived British comic publisher APComics. It was pitched to the publisher by writer Chris Bunting who was joined with pencils by Neil Edwards, inks by Randy Emberlin and with colours by Don Mackinnon. Mr. T was also listed as a Creative Supervisor on the series and did a round of interviews as publicity for the series launch.

The series got a lot of press interest, announcing itself to be one of the biggest licensing deals in British comic's history. Ultimately, it had a very short life, most probably due to the closure of APComics. It featured as a six-page preview of APComics upcoming comics and then two issues were released. Apparently the second issue, released several months after the first, was released out of license by APComics and many copies were ordered to be immediately withdrawn.

Richard Emms, owner of APComics, 'left' for Markosia and with him went a number of titles. However, Mr. T was not one of those and there were a variety of complaints including of non-payment emerging from creatives working on Mr. T. That appears to have been settled by APComics. In 2006 new cover art from Jim Steranko appeared as a US publisher had temporary permission to use the license for the third and final issue in the comic book series. In February 2008 publisher Mohawk Media released an all-new Mr. T graphic novel. Entitled Mr. T: Limited Advance Edition Graphic Novel it was limited to 4,000 copies. The regular worldwide edition of the Mr. T graphic novel was released in December 2008. Later that same month, Mohawk Media announced a line of merchandise and gift products based on the Mr. T graphic novel.

=== A-Team comics ===
Mr. T appeared, as B. A. Baracus, in The A-Team comic adaptation that appeared in Look-In for throughout the 1980s. An A-Team strip also ran in TV Comic sold in UK. Length of run is unknown.

From 1983 to 1984, Marvel Comics released an A-Team title which ran for 3 issues. Due to the huge popularity of both comics and The A-Team show at that time, information which lists this as a 3-issue 'mini-series' is probably accurate. The Marvel Comics series was sold individually then released in "packs": one pack contained the first 2 issues, the next all 3 issues. Each pack was a sealed transparent bag featuring Marvel's logo and a picture of Spider-Man. Marvel released the series in a trade paperback called The A-Team Storybook. (ISBN 0517553856).

The Marvel US comics were also reprinted by Marvel UK in a variety of formats including hardback annual book and The A-Team Summer Special 1985 and The A-Team Summer Special #2 (1986). The final Marvel UK hardback A-Team annual was released in 1991, several years after the cancellation of The A-Team TV series, showing its continued popularity in the UK despite this.

In 2010, IDW Publishing issued several comic books tying in with The A-Team film, but neither of these feature Mr. T, but rather actor Quinton Jackson, who took over the role of B. A. Baracus for the film.

=== Other comics ===
- "Mr. T Annual 1984" was published by Grandreams Ltd and Ruby-Spears, based on the Mister T series and includes comic strips.
- "Mr. T Annual 1985" was published by Grandreams Ltd and Ruby-Spears, based on the Mister T and includes comic strips.

Mr. T also appeared through postmodern reference in:

- New Mutants Annual #3 by Marvel Comics
- Archie's T.V. Laughout #92
- E-Man #20 by First Comics

== See also ==
- Mr T. cartoon
- Mr. T
