= Fright Night (comic series) =

1988 comic book series published by Now Comics

- Fright Night #1

Publication information
- Publisher: Now Comics
- Format: Monthly
- Genre: Horror
- Publication date: October 1988 – August 1990
- No. of issues: 22 +5 special issues

Creative team
- Written by: Tony Caputo; Katherine Llewellyn; Diane M. Piron-Gelman; James Van Hise; Joe Gentile; Matthew Costello
- Artist(s): Dell Barras; Hannibal King; Eric Brant; Jeff Starling; Alan Freeman; Ken Call; Corey Wilkinson; Jim Reddington
- Penciller(s): Lenin Delsol; Neil Vokes; Kevin West; James Lyle; Doug Murphy
- Inker(s): John Stangeland; David Mowry; Damon Willis; Nick Sigismondi; Jeff Dee; Mark Pennington
- Letterer(s): Dan Nakrosis; Kurt Hathaway; Patrick Williams; Joseph Allen; Katherine Mayer
- Colorist(s): Katherine Llewellyn; Tammy Daniel; Nanette Injeski; Tom Gianni; Suzanne Dechnik; Patrick Owsley
- Editor(s): Katherine Llewellyn; Tony Caputo

Fright Night is a 1988 comic book series published by Now Comics. It is based on the 1985 film Fright Night. The first two issues simply adapt the film, but after that the plots are original.

== Plot ==
Charley Brewster is an average teenager who finds his world turned upside-down when vampire Jerry Dandrige moves in next door. He enlists the aid of horror movie star/TV host Peter Vincent to kill Dandrige and they're successful—but not before Charley's best friend, Evil Ed, is transformed into a bloodthirsty monster who delights in tormenting his former buddy. Soon Peter and Charley team up to fend off a variety of monsters, including squid-men, a spider boy, aliens, a minotaur, an evil sorceress and the nefarious Legion of the Endless Night, a vampire coven which later resurrects Jerry Dandrige.

Aiding Peter and Charley on their adventures are Charley's girlfriend, Natalia Hinnault, whose father has ties to the vampire underworld; Natalia's eccentric Aunt Claudia, who is the reincarnation of Greek Princess Ariadne; and hapless bartender Derek Jones, who seems to have a magnetic attraction to unworldly beings—much to his chagrin. Frequently featured are Evil Ed's minions, freelance reporter Dana Roberts and bartenders Donna and Jane, who all work in the nightclubs that he owns and perform in his band, Eddie and the Vamps. Also regularly seen are a group of mindless, nameless hippies who are continuously in search of a savior to follow, be it good or evil.

== Prints ==
=== Main series ===
==== Issues ====
#	Title	Date	Plot
1	"Fright Night"	October 1988	Movie adaptation, part 1
Note: This issue ends with an unrelated 6-page story titled "By the Numbers" which features a psychiatrist interviewing a mental patient who believes himself to be a werewolf.
2	"Fright Night"	November 1988	Movie adaptation, part 2
Note: This issue closes with a blurb which reads, "Next issue: The Return of Evil Ed? An all-new adventure!" Evil Ed did return, but not until issue #8.
3	"The Dead Remember"	January 1989	Peter and Charley have to deal with "brain bats" that are leeching onto people's heads and taking control of their bodies.
Note: The story was credited to Joe Gentile but it was actually written by James Van Hise.; This issue ends with an unrelated 4-page story titled "Revenge of the Vengeful Avenger," which revolves around a man who's killed by his business associates and returns from the dead for revenge.
4	"Eight Arms to Hold You"	February 1989	While visiting Squid Fest, the police enlist Peter and Charley to help them defeat the Squid-Men.
Note: Beginning with this issue, each book began ending with a chapter from Rust, another comic title that the company was preparing to launch. 7 chapters were announced, but only 6 were printed in Fright Night.
5	"The Spider-Boy"	March 1989	Peter is replaced on "Fright Night" by Pogo the Killer Clown. Meanwhile, a young boy finds himself blessed with the ability to become a Spider-Man... and not a do-gooding Peter Parker type.
6	"The Legion of the Endless Night"	April 1989	Peter and Charley find themselves running through the marshes of New Orleans, trying to escape the titular legion of vampires.
7	"The Legion of the Endless Night (Conclusion)"	May 1989	With the help of a backwoods couple and their unusual offspring, Peter and Charley are able to defeat the Legion of the Endless Night... temporarily, anyway.
Note: This is the first issue of the series to carry the seal of the Comics Code Authority which, decades earlier, had forbid depictions of vampires, werewolves and other monsters along with the sort of violence and mild profanity that is rampant throughout the Fright Night series.
8	"The Revenge of Evil Ed!"	June 1989	The new DJ at "The Club" is actually Evil Ed, who seems hellbent on screwing with Charley Brewster's head. Meanwhile, Charley learns that his new girlfriend Natalia's father was killed by a vampire.
Note: This is the first issue written by Tony Caputo and featuring art by Neil Vokes. There's an overtly comedic shift in tone and many characters who are established in this issue recur throughout the rest of the series.; Photos of Stephen Geoffreys, who played Evil Ed in the movie, adorn the covers of issues #8 and #9.
9	"The Revenge of Evil Ed! (Conclusion)"	July 1989	After Evil Ed implicates Peter and Charley in a front-page gay scandal, Peter loses his job. Meanwhile, Ed toys with bartender Derek, who soon comes to the realization that his work environment is overrun with vampires.
Notes: This book included the sixth and final chapter from Rust. Beginning with the next issue, Fright Night stories dominated each issue.
10	"Psychedelic Death, Part 1"	August 1989	As Peter's trippy 1960s film debuts on TV, all of the principal characters are glued to their sets. Meanwhile, extraterrestrials surface at a local bar.
11	"Psychedelic Death, Part 2"	September 1989	Derek the bartender freaks out when he discovers his new boss, Lennie, is an alien who's planning global domination, but Evil Ed haplessly saves the day.
Note: Although he's mentioned several times, Peter Vincent does not appear in this issue.
12	"Bull-Whipped"	October 1989	Charley and Natalia head off to Crete to visit her eccentric Aunt Claudia, whom it is soon revealed is the reincarnation of Ariadne. Soon Claudia raises thousand-year-old God Theseus, which incites the wrath of his minotaur nemesis.
13	"Pup Pet"	November 1989	While Peter endures hardships shooting a film, Charley takes over as host on the Fright Night TV show, which features a movie about a lonely little girl who hides an unusual collection of pets in the basement, where her handicapped father can't find them.
Note: This is a one-off in which Charley and Peter have no direct involvement with the issue's main story.; This issue includes a pull-out photo centerfold of Roddy McDowall as Peter Vincent, shot on the set of Fright Night Part 2.
14	"The Resurrection of Dracula, Part 1"	December 1989	Peter's enrolled into "The Institute for the Performing Arts and Expansion of the Subconscious," where he's been hypnotized into thinking he's Abraham Van Helsing. Charley and Natalia attempt to bring him back to reality by putting on a Count Dracula performance, but Evil Ed convolutes matters.
Note: Artist Neil Vokes urged the crew to do a Count Dracula story, and this was the result, for which Vokes received a "co-plotted by" credit.; Character Boris Christopher was modeled after actor Christopher Lee.
15	"The Resurrection of Dracula, Part 2"	January 1990	The experimental play has been a resounding failure, Natalia's life is in jeopardy, her Aunt shows up to unmask the doctor as a fraud, and Peter 'Van Helsing' decides to save the day.
16	"Potion Motion"	February 1990	Aunt Claudia finds herself under the control of evil sorceress Constance Beauregard, who plans to resurrect Jerry Dandrige.
17	"Blood Ball"	March 1990	Evil Ed finds himself in league with a vampire basketball player. Meanwhile, the Legion of the Endless Night make their final preparations to resurrect Jerry Dandridge.
Note: This is the first issue penciled by Kevin West.; This is the only issue in which neither Peter nor Charley appear.
18	"Fang Fusion"	April 1990	After Evil Ed alerts Charley to the resurrection of Jerry Dandrige, Aunt Claudia decides to form an Anti-Monster Society. Meanwhile, bartender Derek decides to take matters into his own hands.
Note: This is the only issue penciled by James Lyle.
19	"Daddy's Girl"	May 1990	The Anti-Monster Society takes on Jerry Dandrige and Claudia's father, Jacob, whom she discovers is the leader of The Legion of the Endless Night.
20	"The Charge of the Dead Brigade"	June 1990	The Anti-Monster Society tries to find a way to lift the zombie curse from Derek when they encounter a gaggle of other zombies.
21	"Were-Wolf, There-Wolf"	July 1990	When Charley has his soul transferred into the body of a timber wolf, he has trouble convincing Peter, Natalia and Aunt Claudia that he's more than just a stray animal.
22	"Reign of Terror"	August 1990	Jerry Dandrige has been amassing an army of Parisian vampire prostitutes and everyone agrees that he must be destroyed. Evil Ed attempts to enlist Charley and Peter for help, but when they refuse he decides to kill Dandrige himself.
Note: The plans and ultimate fate of Jerry Dandrige were never revealed, since this was not intended to be the final issue. One additional story, "Nightmares" was completed and later released in 3-D, but the plot did not revolve around Dandrige.; The cover art is credited to Eric Brant but Hannibal King's signature is prominently displayed.

==== Reprints ====
Title	Date	Plot
"Fright Night 3-D Special"	1992	A 3-D reprint of "Psychedelic Death" parts 1 & 2. As Peter's trippy 1960s film debuts on TV, all of the principal characters are glued to their sets. Meanwhile, extraterrestrials surface at a local bar. Derek the bartender freaks out when he discovers his new boss, Lennie, is an alien who's planning global domination, but Evil Ed haplessly saves the day.
"Fright Night 3-D Fall Special"	1992	A 3-D reprint of "The Resurrection of Dracula" parts 1 & 2. Peter's enrolled into "The Institute for the Performing Arts and Expansion of the Subconscious," where he's been hypnotized into thinking he's Abraham Van Helsing. Charley and Natalia attempt to bring him back to reality by putting on a Count Dracula performance, but Evil Ed convolutes matters. The experimental play has been a resounding failure, Natalia's life is in jeopardy, her Aunt shows up to unmask the doctor as a fraud, and Peter 'Van Helsing' decides to save the day.
"Fright Night 3-D Winter Special"	1993	A 3-D reprint of "The Dead Remember." Peter and Charley have to deal with "brain bats" that are leeching onto people's heads and taking control of their bodies.

=== Annuals ===
Title	Date	Plot
"Fright Night 3-D Halloween Annual"	1993	Debut printing of "Nightmares" in which Constance Beauregard returns to summon a flock of demonic harpies.
Note: "Nightmares" is not an ending to the series like some fans expected but a previously unprinted special.
