= Terminator: The Burning Earth =

Comic-book series

- Terminator: The Burning Earth vol. #1; Art by Alex Ross.

Publication information
- Publisher: NOW Comics
- Format: Limited series
- Genre: Science fiction
- Publication date: March – July, 1990
- No. of issues: 5

Creative team
- Written by: Ron Fortier
- Artist: Alex Ross

Collected editions
- Terminator: The Burning Earth: ISBN 1-59687-820-7

Terminator: The Burning Earth is a graphic novel first published in 1990. It was published by NOW Comics as a five-part story utilizing characters featured in James Cameron's popular film, The Terminator. The story was written by Ron Fortier. It was illustrated by 19-year-old artist Alex Ross, as his first published comic work.

A digitally remastered reissue was later published by iBooks.

== Plot ==
The story is set as part of the background history of John Connor's future war with the machines. It is also set after the events of the 17 part The Terminator (1988–1989) series also penned by Fortier. The story starts with members of the resistance fighting against the machines with John (nicknamed Bear) giving a commentary on how the war has been. Later he is seen having what could only be described as a loss of faith as he is shown putting a pistol to his mouth. However, after watching two lone fighters (one injured) firing on an oncoming Hunter Killer tank only to be run over, John regains his resolve to never stop and never give up.

The story continues from Skynet's perspective of completing final tests of the Terminator (a female called Aurora). It also shows Skynet initiating its final solution to the human problem, with a co-ordinated mass nuclear carpet bombing of humanity with nuclear weapons strapped underneath Aerial Hunter Killers. As John and his group are formulating an attack on Skynet's mainframe at Thunder Mountain, his troops see the Aerials and they decide that an immediate strike is needed and mobilize. There are two groups, one that will assault the mainframe and one that will attempt to knock out the facility's external power station.

The initial strike sparks off a volcanic eruption at a fault line bringing fiery winds along with the shock waves. These winds strike the Thunder Mountain facility just as John's group reach the outer doors. The ensuing chaos allows him and his commandos to get inside before the blast doors close. Once inside John's group have a running firefight to the main frame with John being lowered in front of it on a rope, just as the second group succeeds in causing an avalanche that flattens the power facility. John has a brief exchange with Skynet and fires his rifle into the mainframe screen and then falls from his rope and lands at the feet of a terminator who aims its rifle at his head. The shot never comes as everything powers down. The final scenes show the resistance leaving Thunder Mountain into a sunrise, but then cuts to an image of John's powered down Terminator. The last panel showing red glowing eyes as it powers up back to life.

== Associations and continuity ==
In the story Thunder Mountain is referenced as Skynet's mainframe. However inside are signs indicating it as a NORAD facility. Since NORAD's main technical facility since 1963 has been the Cheyenne Mountain Operations Center in Colorado it is not known if this was just a story device or if it was meant to be Thunder Mountain in California. The Jeremiah comic series and its television spin off also include a Cheyenne Mountain-like complex called Thunder Mountain.

As with most comics based on film franchises, it may not be considered canon by future filmmakers. Notably, the alternate future of Terminator 3: Rise of the Machines established that the films' version of Skynet did not have a central mainframe, being more a part of the internet than a stand-alone facility.

== Collected editions ==
The series has been collected as a trade paperback a number of times:

- Terminator: The Burning Earth : Graphic Novel (Caputo Publishing, May 1990, ISBN 0-942759-04-4)
- Terminator: The Burning Earth (128 pages, iBooks, January 2004, ISBN 0-7434-7927-0)
- Terminator: The Burning Earth (128 pages, iBooks, January 2006, ISBN 1-59687-820-7)

== See also ==
- List of comics based on films
