= NOW Comics =

Comic book publisher

- Industry: Comics
- Founded: 1985; 41 years ago
- Founder: Tony C. Caputo
- Defunct: 2006; 20 years ago
- Headquarters: Chicago, Illinois, U.S.
- Parent: Caputo Publishing, Inc.
- Divisions: NOW Library, NOW Video
- Website: Official website

NOW Comics was a comic book publisher founded in late 1985 by Tony C. Caputo as a sole-proprietorship. During the four years after its founding, NOW grew from a one-man operation to operating in 12 countries, and published almost 1,000 comic books.

The company was headquartered in the Chicago Loop in Chicago, Illinois. Most NOW titles were the results of licensing arrangements with such companies as Columbia Pictures, Broadway Video, ELP Communications, CBS Entertainment, Inc., Speed Racer Enterprises, and Leisure Concepts, resulting in titles like Vector, Mr. T & The T-Force, Speed Racer, The Original Astro Boy, Alias, Terminator: The Burning Earth, The Real Ghostbusters and Ghostbusters II, Fright Night, Married... with Children, and The Green Hornet.

== History ==
NOW Comics started in late 1985 as a sole-proprietorship, with the first publications shipping in May 1986. It became Caputo Publishing, Inc. in 1987.

In a four-year period, CPI grew from a one-man operation with annual sales of $110,000 to an international multimillion-dollar corporation, with close to 100 full-time employees and freelancers, and the #3 position in comic book market share. During this period, CPI created such cross-promotional ventures as The Real Ghostbusters cereal (with Ralston Purina) and Slimer's Ecto-Cooler Hi-C drink (with Coca-Cola Foods).

In 1989, the comics division began to lose steam, suffering from lack of focus and internal dissension. In 1990, NOW was forced to file Chapter 7 bankruptcy by Quebecor Printing and the General Learning Corporation. After being bought by General Learning, NOW Comics relaunched in 1991 as the NOW Entertainment Corporation This new infusion of over $2 million in capital catapulted the company to number five in market share within its first quarter of business, and NOW Entertainment was nominated as best new publisher of 1991.

In 1993, NOW and Malibu/Eternity co-published the crossover series Ninja High School featuring Speed Racer.

In 1994, the company ceased publishing after its "January 1995" releases, six months after founder Caputo left.

In 2003, Caputo returned, reviving the publisher as NOW Media Group, Inc. The new company, dubbed "NOW Comics 3.0" by Caputo, was re-launched as a graphic novel "self-publisher", giving creators a partnership role in the business. Books published by this iteration of NOW Comics included Vespers (an original graphic novel written and illustrated by Caputo), Vinny, the Bug Man (a 3D animated graphic novel by Chet Spiewak, including a CD-ROM), and black and white collected editions of Marc Hansen's Ralph Snart, Doctor Gorpon, and Weird Melvin series. Planned but unreleased were Mirrorwalker (collecting the originally intended two issues of the Barry Daniel Peterson and Marv Wolfman 1990 series) and Syphons (collecting volume two of the series), which was later published by Image Comics. The business plan didn't pan out and the company folded in 2005, with the corporation fully dissolved in February 2006.

== NOW Video ==
In 1988, CPI purchased to rights to release the original Speed Racer anime on home video, eventually releasing 22 volumes of Speed Racer on VHS under the banner "NOW Video". In addition, there were two special gift sets: the Speed Racer Collector's Edition (1989), which included a 90-minute VHS copy of the three-part episode "The Most Dangerous Race", a Speed Racer bumper sticker, a Slimer! Hi-C Ecto Cooler coupon, and copies of Speed Racer Special #1, Speed Racer Classics v1 & v2, and Now What?! #4; and the Speed Racer Silver Anniversary Edition (1992), which included a 55-minute VHS copy of the two-part episode "Challenge of the Masked Racer" as well as copies of Speed Racer Classics v2, and the "Speed Racer 5th Anniversary Collector's Edition" of Speed Racer v2 #1. In 1989, City Video Productions and NOW Comics co-produced The What NOW Caper, a sixty-minute comedy-documentary on comic book production starring Jim Vincent as detective "Mel Mudd".

== Creators associated with NOW Comics ==
During its operation, NOW acquired the talents of such industry veterans as Harlan Ellison, Neal Adams, Jim Steranko, Bill Sienkiewicz, Mike Baron, Jeff Butler, Dave Dorman, and Chuck Dixon. Alex Ross did his first professional comics work with the company (in Terminator: The Burning Earth), and Clint McElroy wrote several comics with NOW in the early 1990s. NOW also collaborated with entertainers like Mr. T, Van Williams, and Terry Gilliam.

== Titles ==
- The Adventures of Baron Munchausen (1989), #1–4
- 3 Ninjas Kick Back (1994), #1
- A Boy and His 'Bot (1987), #1
- Alias (1990), #1–5
- Bats, Cats, & Cadillacs (1990), #1–2
- Dai Kamikaze! (1987–1988), #1–12
- Doctor Gorpon (2004), B&W, collects Doctor Gorpon (1991), #1–3 from Eternity.
- Eb'nn (June 1986 – January 1987), #3–6 [from #1–2 (1985–1986) published by Crowquill Comics]
- FanGraphiX (1984–1986), #1–4 [as Tony Caputo Publishing]
- Freejack (1992), #1–3
- Fright Night Part II (1988), TPB adapting the Fright Night Part 2 film
- Fright Night
  - v1 (1988–1990), #1–22
  - 3-D Special (1992)
  - 3-D Fall Special (1992)
  - Halloween Annual (1993)
  - 3-D Winter Special (1993)
- Ghostbusters II (1989), #1–3
- Graves Inc. Derides Again (1988), collects Graves Inc. newspaper strips [as Caputo Publishing/NOW Library]
- The Green Hornet
  - v1 (1989–1990), #1–14
  - v2 (1991–1995), #1–40
  - Tales of, v1 (1990), #1–2
  - Tales of, v2 (1992), #1–4
  - Tales of, v3 (1992), #1–3
  - Sting of (1992), #1–4
  - 1992 Annual (1992), #1
  - 1994 Annual (1994), #1
  - Solitary Sentinel (1992–1993) #1–3
  - Dark Tomorrow (1993), #1–3
- Kato
  - v1 (1991), #1–4 (indicia reads Kato of the Green Hornet, v1)
  - v2 (1992), #1–2 (indicia reads Kato of the Green Hornet II, v1)
- Little Monsters (1990), #1–4
- Married... with Children
  - v1 (1991), #1–7
  - v2 (1991–1992), #1–7
  - Collector's Special (1992), #1
  - Kelly Bundy Special (1992), #1–3
  - Flashback (1993), #1–3
  - 3-D Special (1993), #1
  - Off Broadway (1993), #1
  - 2099 (1993), #1–3
  - Quantum Quartet (1993–1994), #1–4 (#3 & 4 are combined as a flip-book)
  - 1994 Annual (1994), #1
  - Buck's Tale (1994), #1
  - Bud Bundy, Fanboy in Paradise (1994), #1
  - Kelly Goes to Kollege (1994), #1–3
  - Lotto Fever! (1995), #1 (#2 & 3 were never released)
- MirrorWalker (1990), #1 (#2 unpublished)
- Mr. Lizard
  - Color Special (1993), #1 (with "Instant Ralph Snart" capsule)
  - 3-D Special (1993), #1 (with "Instant Mr. Lizard" capsule)
- Mr. T & The T-Force (1993–1994), #1–10
- NOW What?! (1989), #1–13 (NOW Comics news magazine)
- Prime Slime Tales (), #3–4 [from Mirage Comics]
- The Original Astro Boy (September 1987 – June 1989)
- Racer X
  - v1 (1988–1989), #1–11
  - v2 (1989–1990), #1–10
- Ralph Snart Adventures
  - v1 (1986), #1–3
  - v2 (1986–1987), #1–9
  - v3 (1988–1990), #1–26
  - v4 (1992), #1–3
  - 3-D Special (1992)
  - v5 (1993), #1–4
  - The Lost Issues (1993), #1–3
  - Comic Collection #1 (2003), B&W, collects v1 #1–3 & v3 #1–16
  - Comic Collection #2 (2004), B&W, collects v3 #17–23, v4 #1–3, & v5 #1–5
- The Real Ghostbusters
  - v1 (1988–1990), #1–27
  - v2 (1991–1992), #1–4
  - Spectacular 3-D Special (1991)
  - Annual (1992)
  - 3-D Annual (1993)
  - 3-D Slimer Special (1993)
- Rust (1989)
  - v1 (1987–1988), #1–13
  - v2 (1989), #1–7
- Silverwing (1987), #1, collects the back-up feature from Eb'nn #2–3
- Slimer!
  - v1 (1989-1990), #1–19
  - The Big Comic Book (1991), collects Slimer! #1–3
- Speed Racer
  - v1 (1987–1990), #1–38
  - Mach V Special (1988), #1
  - Classics v1 (1988), collects selected chapters of the original Mach GoGoGo manga [as Caputo Publishing/NOW Library] (225 pages)
  - Classics v2 (1989), collects selected chapters of the original Mach GoGoGo manga (100 pages)
  - v2 (1992), #1–3
  - featuring Ninja High School (1993), #1–2 — co-published with Malibu/Eternity
  - The New Adventures of (1993–1994), #0–5
  - Return of the GRX (1994), #1–2
- Supercops (1990–1991), #1–4
- Syphons
  - v1 (1986–1987), #1–7
  - v2 (1994), #1–3, collected as Syphons (2004) by Image Comics
  - v3 The Sygate Strategem (1994–1995), #1–3
- The Terminator (1988–1990), #1–17
- Terminator: All My Futures Past (1990), #1–2
- Terminator: The Burning Earth (1990), #1–5; collected as Terminator: The Burning Earth (1990) [as Caputo Publishing/NOW Library]
- The Twilight Zone
  - v1 (1990), #1 [reprinted as Twilight Zone Premiere (1991)]
  - v2 (1991–1992), #1–11 (#1 was a separate issue from Twilight Zone Premiere)
  - v3 (1993), #1–4
  - Annual (1993), #1
  - 3-D Special (1993), #1
- Universal Soldier (1992), #1–3
- Valor Thunderstar and His Fireflies (1986), #1
- Vector (1986), #1–4
- Vespers (2004), TPB
- Vinny, the Bug Man (2004), TPB (includes CD-ROM)
- Weird Melvin
  - The Comic Book Collection (2004), B&W, collects Weird Melvin #1–5 (1995) from Marc Hansen Stuff
  - The Comic Strip Collection (2004), B&W, collects strips from the Comics Buyer's Guide (B&W)
