= Tony Caputo =

American author, visual artist, entrepreneur, and former publisher

Tony C. Caputo (b. December 23, 1957) is an American author, visual artist, entrepreneur, and former publisher.

== Career ==
In 1985, Caputo founded NOW Comics and NOW Entertainment Corporation, a multimedia company that published comic books, children's periodicals, trade paperback books, and home videos of such characters as Speed Racer, the Terminator, The Real Ghostbusters, Mr. T & the T-Force, and The Green Hornet. Caputo was active in comics fandom, and he founded NOW Comics with some of the people he had worked with on fanzines. At its height in 1990, the company had $5 million in sales, 17 employees and 70 freelancers.

Caputo ran NOW until 1994, briefly reviving the company from 2003 to 2005.

After leaving the comic book and entertainment business in 1994, Caputo moved into information technology, first with Ahrens Interactive in 1995, and then with HyperLOCK in 1996.

From 2005 to 2010, Caputo worked for IBM.

In the 2020s, he worked for Hitachi.

== Books and articles ==
While working at NOW, he authored the graphic novel Vespers, and wrote an article on the American comic book market, which included detailed market share reports for the first time.

Caputo's nonfiction books include How To Self-Publish Your Own Comic Book (Watson-Guptill), Visual Storytelling: The Art and the Technique, Build Your Own Server (McGraw-Hill) and Digital Video Surveillance and Security (Elsevier/Reed). His articles have been published by ICv2.com.
