= James Victor (actor) =

Dominican actor (1939–2016)

- Publicity Photo of James Victor
- Born: Lincoln Peralta; July 27, 1939; Santiago de los Caballeros, Dominican Republic
- Died: June 20, 2016 (aged 76); Hollywood, California, U.S.
- Resting place: Hollywood Forever Cemetery
- Occupation: Actor

Lincoln Peralta (July 27, 1939 – June 20, 2016), known professionally as James Victor, was a Dominican actor. He was best known for his role of Sgt. Jaime Mendoza on The Family Channel television series, Zorro, from 1990 to 1993 for four seasons. Victor was a longtime protege of filmmaker John Cassavetes. He appeared in several of Cassavetes' films, including Shadows (1959), Too Late Blues (1961), and Faces (1968).

== Biography ==
=== Early life and career ===
Victor, the youngest of his family's six children, was born Lincoln Peralta in Santiago de los Caballeros, Dominican Republic, on July 27, 1939. He emigrated from the Dominican Republic to New York City with his family when he was four years old. He would later choose the stage name "James Victor" in honor of his older brother.

In 1958, Victor graduated from the now defunct Haaren High School in the Hell's Kitchen section of Midtown Manhattan. He got a job in the mailroom of the Walt Disney Company's New York City offices and joined El Nuevo Círculo Dramatico, a bilingual theater company, after graduating from high school.

By chance, Victor met John Cassavetes, who would become a personal and professional mentor. The meeting led Victor to study at an acting workshop which had been established by Cassavetes and Burt Lane, a theater director and acting coach. Cassavetes liked Victor's work and cast him in several of his films, including Shadows in 1959, Too Late Blues in 1961, and Faces in 1968. Victor called Cassavetes his "godfather" and the friendship between the two continued until Cassavetes' death in 1989.

=== Television ===
In 1962, both Victor and Cassavetes guest starred on an episode of The Lloyd Bridges Show. Victor's television credits during the 1960s to the 1980s included guest spots on My Three Sons, I Spy, Family Affair, Adam-12, Kung Fu, The White Shadow, Falcon Crest, Remington Steele and Murder, She Wrote.

In addition to his guest television spots, Victor was a full cast member on three series on ABC during the 1970s and 1980s. In 1976, Victor appeared on the short-lived ABC summertime replacement, Viva Valdez, a show about the Valdezs, a Mexican-American family who operate a plumbing business in East Los Angeles. He next co-starred in 1983 television sitcom, Condo, which starred McLean Stevenson and Luis Ávalos, playing the grandfather of a Hispanic family. Victor also played the grandfather of Elizabeth Peña's character on I Married Dora, which aired on ABC from 1987 to 1988.

He became best known for his starring role as Sgt. Jaime Mendoza on Zorro for four seasons from 1990 to 1994.

=== Film ===
In addition to his earlier film work with Cassavetes, Victor appeared opposite William Devane in Rolling Thunder in 1977, Borderline in 1980, and Losin' It in 1983.

In Stand and Deliver (1988), a biopic about teacher Jaime Escalante starring Edward James Olmos, Victor played the father of one of Esclannte's students. Victor's character opposed Escalante's efforts to encourage his daughter to attend college.

=== Theater ===
In 1986, Victor starred in I Don't Have to Show You No Stinking Badges!, a satirical play by playwright Luis Valdez, during its premiere and original run at the Los Angeles Theatre Center.

=== Later life ===
Victor, who suffered from heart disease, died at his apartment in Hollywood, on June 20, 2016, at the age of 76. He was survived by several aunts, cousins, nieces and nephews. Victor was buried in the Hollywood Forever Cemetery on July 10, 2016.

== Filmography ==
Year	Title	Role	Notes
1968	Girl in Gold Boots	Joey	
1972	Fuzz	Patrolman Gomez	
1977	Rolling Thunder	Lopez	
1979	Boulevard Nights	Gil Moreno	
1980	Defiance	Father Rivera	
1980	Borderline	Mirandez	
1983	Losin' It	Lawyer	
1988	The Telephone	Big Ray on Answering Machine	Voice
1988	Stand and Deliver	Hector Delgado	
1995	Gunfighter's Moon	Juan Acosta	
1995	Streets of Laredo (miniseries)	Gordo	
2006	Ray of Sunshine		
2012	Casa de mi padre	Old Friend #3	
2012	Bless Me, Ultima	Antonio's Grandfather	(final film role)
