= In the Beginning (TV series) =

Short-lived TV sitcom starring McLean Stevenson

- Genre: Sitcom
- Created by: Norman Lear; Jim Mulligan; Norman Steinberg
- Starring: McLean Stevenson; Priscilla Lopez
- Country of origin: United States
- Original language: English
- No. of seasons: 1
- No. of episodes: 9 (4 unaired)

Production
- Executive producers: Norman Lear; Jim Mulligan; Norman Steinberg
- Producer: McLean Stevenson
- Camera setup: Multi-camera
- Running time: 30 minutes
- Production company: T.A.T. Communications Company

Original release
- Network: CBS
- Release: September 20 – October 18, 1978

In the Beginning is an American sitcom originally created by Norman Lear, Jim Mulligan, and Norman Steinberg and produced by Lear's T.A.T. Communications Company. The show aired on CBS from September 20 to October 18, 1978, and was cancelled after its first five episodes aired due to low ratings.

== Premise ==
The series, a semi-update of the film Going My Way, featured conservative priest Father Cleary and liberal, streetwise nun Sister Agnes (known as "Aggie") running a ghetto mission together in Baltimore.

While Aggie was from the area and enjoyed the assignment, Father Cleary had difficulty dealing with her (frequently referring to her as "Attila the Nun"), as well as the neighborhood prostitutes, hustlers and winos.

== Cast ==
- McLean Stevenson as Father Daniel "Dan" Cleary
- Priscilla Lopez as Sister Agnes
- Priscilla Morrill as Sister Lillian
- Olivia Barash as Willie
- Bobby Ellerbee as Jerome Rockefeller
- Jack Dodson as Msgr. Frank Barlow

== Episodes ==
No.	Title	Directed by	Written by	Original release date
1	"Pilot"	Doug Rogers & Jack Shea	Jim Mulligan & Norman Steinberg	September 20, 1978
A conservative priest and a liberal nun open up a mission together.
2	"What's It All About?"	Doug Rogers	Patt Shea & Harriett Weiss	September 27, 1978
Aggie has feelings for a travelling musician.
3	"Father Cleary's Crisis"	Doug Rogers	Leonara Thuna	October 4, 1978
Father Cleary is passed over for monsignor.
4	"The Good Thief"	Will Mackenzie	Joseph Bonaduce	October 11, 1978
A neighborhood kid is accused of stealing from the church.
5	"Aggie's Love Story"	Doug Rogers	Patt Shea & Harriett Weiss	October 18, 1978
Aggie and Cleary attempt to start a sex education class for the kids who come to the mission.
6	"The Poker Game"	Randy Winburn	Ron Bloomberg	Unaired
Aggie and Lillian raise money for the kids' camping trip by playing poker.
7	"The Kook"	Bob Lally	Michael Morris	Unaired
8	"Well Healed"	Marc Daniels	Stephen A. Miller	Unaired
9	"Wedding for Thee"	Doug Rogers	Charles Stewart & Arthur Phillips	Unaired

== Production ==
First developed by Lear in 1977, the series was originally intended as a starring vehicle for Broadway actress Priscilla Lopez, and was to have been titled Aggie, after her character. However, McLean Stevenson was later added to the cast, and in addition to the title change, it also moved the show's focus from its original premise of Aggie against the establishment to Aggie and her battles with Father Cleary.

In the Beginning also marked McLean Stevenson's second attempt at a successful post-M*A*S*H vehicle. However, the series fared even worse than his short-lived 1976 sitcom The McLean Stevenson Show, earning an anemic 15.1 rating and ranking 74th among all 114 shows that season. In the Beginning was cancelled by CBS after only five of its nine produced episodes had aired, due to the poor ratings and the departures of co-creators Jim Mulligan and Norman Steinberg after the pilot, as a result of conflicts with the network. Stevenson's next show, Hello, Larry, another T.A.T. Communications Company production (albeit on NBC), premiered three months later and ran 15 months with Tandem's Diff'rent Strokes as a lead-in.
