= Dawn Patrol (film) =

- Theatrical release poster
- Directed by: Daniel Petrie Jr.
- Written by: Rachel Long; Brian Pittman
- Produced by: Rick Dugdale; Scott Eastwood; Daniel Petrie Jr.
- Starring: Scott Eastwood; Rita Wilson; Kim Matula; Chris Brochu; Julie Carmen; Jeff Fahey
- Cinematography: Edd Lukas
- Edited by: Jack Colwell
- Music by: Joe Kraemer
- Production company: Enderby Entertainment
- Distributed by: Alchemy
- Release dates: October 25, 2014 (Austin Film Festival); June 5, 2015 (United States)
- Running time: 87 minutes
- Country: United States
- Language: English

Dawn Patrol is a 2014 American thriller film directed by Daniel Petrie Jr. and written by Rachel Long and Brian Pittman. The film stars Scott Eastwood, Rita Wilson, Kim Matula, Chris Brochu, Julie Carmen and Jeff Fahey. The film was released on June 5, 2015, by Alchemy.

== Plot ==
John (Scott Eastwood) is a surfer who, after avenging his brother's murder, discovers he has killed the wrong man and joins the Marine Corps to escape his past. This will come to haunt him even here, in a distant desert, where the protagonist will have to survive a sniper unleashed on his trail.

== Cast ==
- Scott Eastwood as John
- Rita Wilson as Shelia
- Kim Matula as Donna
- Chris Brochu as Ben
- Julie Carmen as Laura Rivera
- Jeff Fahey as "Trick"
- Gabriel De Santi as Miguel
- James C. Burns as Kevie
- Dendrie Taylor as Vicki
- Matt Meola as Gary
- Miles Elliot as Cecil
- Frankie Stone as Jeanette
- Daz Crawford as Charles
- Sean O'Bryan as Mace
- Sewell Whitney as Butler
- Archer Moller as Ben Jr.
- David James Elliott as Jim
- Sally Greenland as Michelle
- Paul Zies as "Dingy"
- Mauricio Mendoza as Detective Campana

== Release ==
The film premiered at the Austin Film Festival on October 25, 2014. The film was released on June 5, 2015, by Alchemy.

== Reception ==
On the review aggregator website Rotten Tomatoes, 0% of 6 critics' reviews are positive, with an average rating of 3.2/10.
