= Barbara Stuart =

American actress (1930–2011)

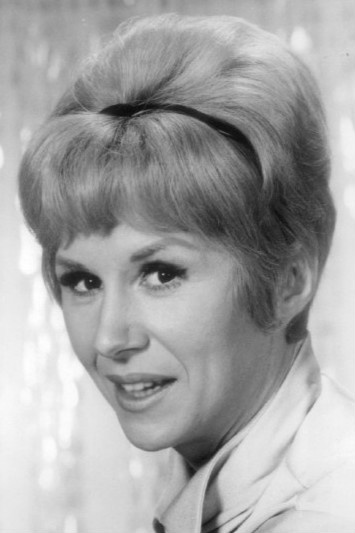
- Stuart in 1968
- Born: Barbara Ann McNeese; January 3, 1930; Paris, Illinois, U.S.
- Died: May 15, 2011 (aged 81); St. George, Utah, U.S.
- Occupation: Actress
- Years active: 1954–2006
- Known for: Bachelor Party; Airplane! Pete and Gladys
- Spouse: Dick Gautier (m. 1967; div. 1979)

Barbara Stuart (born Barbara Ann McNeese; January 3, 1930 – May 15, 2011) was an American actress.

She had a recurring role of Sgt. Carter's girlfriend Bunny on Gomer Pyle, U.S.M.C.

== Early years ==
Born in Paris, Illinois, Stuart was raised in Hume, Illinois. Following her high school graduation, she studied acting at the Schuster-Martin School of Drama in Cincinnati before moving to New York City, where she studied under Uta Hagen and Stella Adler.

== Career ==
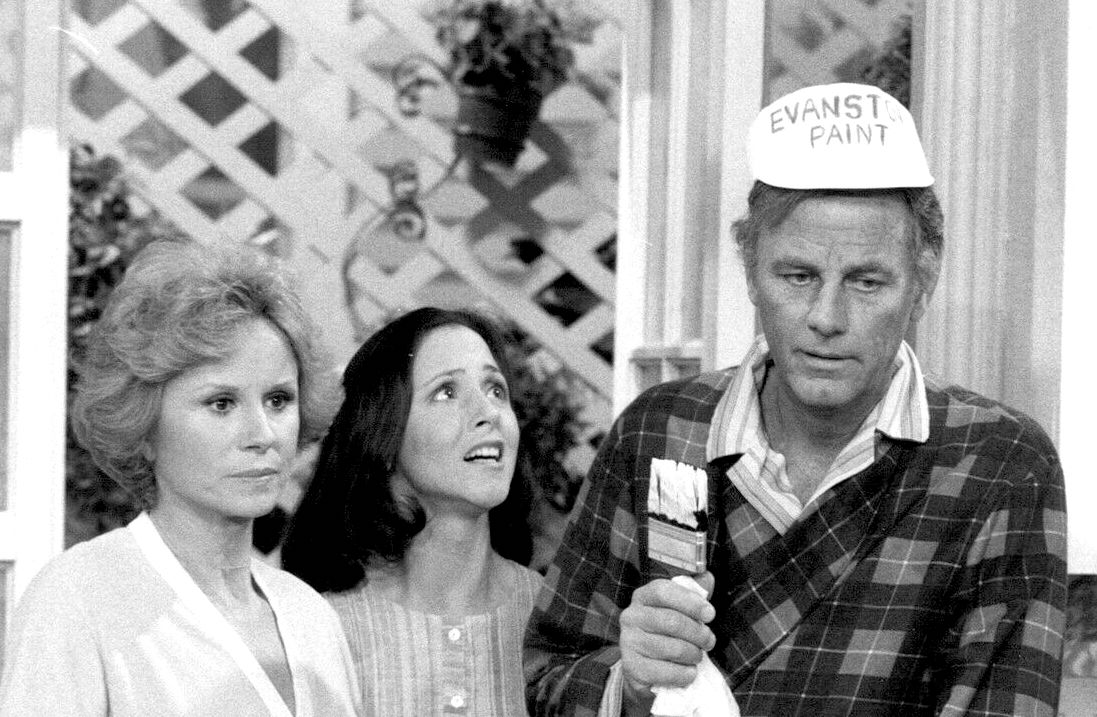
Stuart, Ayn Ruymen and McLean Stevenson in a publicity still for The McLean Stevenson Show 1977

On stage, Stuart performed in the national touring company of Sidney Kingsley's Lunatics and Lovers. In the early 1960s, she was a showgirl in Las Vegas. She also appeared in the films Marines, Let's Go (1961), Hellfighters (1968), Airplane! (1980), Bachelor Party (1984), and Pterodactyl Woman from Beverly Hills (1997).

=== Television ===
Program	Role
The Texan	Poker Alice, episode "The Taming of Rio Nada," 1957
The Lawless Years	as Marie Walters in "The Marie Walters Story" (S01E09 -1959) as Stella Gorman in "The Maxie Gorman Story" (S01E10-1959) as Kiki Melody in "The Billy Boy 'Rockabye' Creel Story" (S02E04-1959) as Ginny in "Ginny" (S03E10 -1961)
The George Burns Show	Lily
Peter Gunn	as Shirley Blaze, S1 E4, "The Blind Pianist" (1958) as Lavinia, S2, E12, "The Briefcase" (1959) as Candy Lane, S3, E24, "Come Dance with Me and Die" (1961)
Perry Mason	as Maizie Freitag, in "The Case of the Brazen Bequest" (S5E12-1961) as Violet Ryder, S4, E28, "The Case of the Guilty Clients" (1961)
The Cara Williams Show	Miss Hartley, episode "Get the Lead Out," 1964
The Andy Griffith Show	Pat Blake, episode "TV or Not TV," 1965
The Dick Van Dyke Show	Maureen Core AKA 'Marine Corps'
Gomer Pyle, U.S.M.C.	Hannah, the “Dragon Lady” and Bunny
The Great Gildersleeve	Bessie
The McLean Stevenson Show	Peggy Ferguson
The Twilight Zone	Edith Rogers, "A Thing About Machines" (S2E4-1960)
Pete and Gladys	Alice
The Queen & I	Wilma Winslow
Batman	Rocket (year two, episodes 31 and 32)
The Rookies	"Warden" Season 4 Episode 5
Banacek	Sailor (bar tender), episode "The Greatest Collection of Them All" (1973)
Three's Company	Mrs. Medford, episode "Chrissy's Cousin" (S5E7-1980); Martha, episode "Jack's Double Date (S7E17-1983)
The Untouchables	Thelma Devores (The George 'Bugs' Moran Story) 1959

In the early 1990s, Stuart performed in dinner theaters.

== Personal life and death ==
Stuart married actor Dick Gautier in 1967. Their honeymoon was canceled by her hospitalization for a blood clot in her leg. She was in the hospital for eight months as the clot moved to her lung and she developed pneumonia.

On May 15, 2011, she died at a nursing home in St. George, Utah, aged 81.
