= Tapawingo =

2024 American comedy film

- Directed by: Dylan K. Narang
- Written by: Brad DeMarea; Dylan K. Narang
- Produced by: Dylan K. Narang; Jeffrey Robinson
- Starring: Jon Heder; Billy Zane
- Music by: Jacob Yoffee
- Production company: Foggy Bottom Pictures
- Release date: September 27, 2024 (Richmond Film Festival)
- Country: United States
- Language: English
- Box office: $2,950

Tapawingo is a 2024 American comedy film written by Brad DeMarea and Dylan K. Narang, directed by Narang and starring Jon Heder and Billy Zane.

A work-in-progress cut premiered at the Virginia Film Festival on October 28, 2023.

== Plot ==
Nate Skoog, an eccentric 30-year-old lives with his mother and works a mundane mail-room job. When he discovers his boss' son Oswalt is the subject of relentless bullying from two local brothers, Nate assembles a team of misfits to form an unconventional security detail.

== Cast ==
- Jon Heder as Nate Skoog
- Jay Pichardo as Will Luna
- Kim Matula as Gretchen
- Sawyer Williams as Oswalt
- Billy Zane as Stoney Tarwater
- Chad Dukes as Nelson Tarwater
- George Psarras as Glenn Gratton
- Paul Psarras as Ben Gratton
- Ariel Flores as Noble Tarwater
- Amanda Bearse as Ramona Skoog
- John Ratzenberger as Tom Roan
- Gina Gershon as Dot
- Jacob Tyler Kemp as Philip Tarwater

== Production ==
Filming began in Hopewell, Virginia, Petersburg, Virginia and Richmond, Virginia in June 2021.

In September 2021, it was announced that filming wrapped in Hopewell.

== Distribution ==
According to music supervisor Jody Friedman, Indican Pictures signed a distribution deal for Tapawingo in July 2025. A release to DVD and streaming services is planned.
