= Billy the Kid (1989 film) =

1989 film

- Genre: Western
- Written by: Gore Vidal
- Directed by: William Graham
- Starring: Val Kilmer; Duncan Regehr; Wilford Brimley; Julie Carmen
- Music by: Laurence Rosenthal
- Country of origin: United States
- Original language: English

Production
- Executive producers: Robert M. Sertner; Frank von Zerneck
- Production locations: Tucson, Arizona; Sonoran Desert; Sierrita Mountains; Sedona, Arizona; Continental, Arizona; Cascabel, Arizona; White Mountains; Sabino Canyon; Mescal, Arizona; Redington, Arizona; Mt. Lemmon; San Pedro River
- Cinematography: Dennis C. Lewiston
- Editor: William B. Stich
- Running time: 96 minutes

Original release
- Network: TNT
- Release: May 10, 1989

Gore Vidal's Billy the Kid, also entitled as Billy the Kid, is a 1989 American western genre western television film depicting the events surrounding the famed gunman/outlaw Billy the Kid during his participation in the Lincoln County War. It aired on TNT cable channel on May 10, 1989.

Written by Gore Vidal and directed by William A. Graham, with Val Kilmer starring in the lead role of William Bonney a.k.a. Billy the Kid, and with a supporting cast including Duncan Regehr as Pat Garrett, Wilford Brimley as Lew Wallace, Julie Carmen, John O'Hurley, and Ned Vaughn.

== Plot ==
In the lawless New Mexico territory of 1879, young William "Billy" Bonney has a home as a hand at the Tunstall ranch. When corrupt lawmen Brady and Dolan enforce a writ of attainder on Turnstall's property, his advice is for Turnstall to take the lawmen by force. Brady kills Turnstall, a man Billy thought of as a father; he quickly takes revenge. He is warned by Tunstall's drunken cousin, that Brady is after him for witnessing his murder of Turnstall. Billy seizes the initiative and kills Brady and his deputy Morton. Pursued by the law, his reputation as a cowboy with a quick temper and the best shot in Lincoln Country spreads, and he is soon known as Billy the Kid. His deal with Gov. Lew Wallace for amnesty for testimony falls through. Wallace lamely apologizes for their deal's getting botched but out of guilt reminds Billy he has killed. Wallace allows Billy to escape, by arranging for Billy to be placed only under house arrest, guarded by the obtuse Deputy Bob Ollinger, but wants Billy's friend, Pat Garrett, newly married, to make sure he leaves the territory. Garrett reveals to Billy he has been appointed sheriff, and suggests Billy should leave. Billy reunites with his lover, the widowed Celsa.

As word of his exploits spreads through newspapers and dime novels, Gov. Lew Wallace puts pressure on Garrett to find the Kid. Valdez Gutierrez, Celsa's father, unsuccessfully tries to persuade Billy to leave, saying "people change". Garrett kills Billy by shooting him through the heart. Poe exults that Pat "outdrew Billy the Kid", while Pete counters that the Kid never had a chance. A teary eyed Pat is humbled by his victory. A mournful Celsa and others carry Billy away for a wake, while the drunkard watches.

== Cast ==
- Val Kilmer as Billy the Kid (William Bonney)
- Duncan Regehr as Pat Garrett
- Wilford Brimley as Gov. Lew Wallace
- Julie Carmen as Celsa
- Albert Salmi as Mr. Maxwell
- Ned Vaughn as Charlie
- Ric San Nicholas as Bell
- Gore Vidal as Preacher (uncredited)
- René Auberjonois as Tunstall's cousin (uncredited)
- John O'Hurley as Dolan
- Michael Parks as Rynerson
- Burr Steers as Billy Henchman
- Tiny Wells as Cowman
- Red West as Joe Grant
- Andrew Bicknell as Tunstall

== Production ==
Vidal said in his memoirs that he had written the original teleplay for The Left Handed Gun, starring Paul Newman as Billy the Kid, decades earlier, and always felt the studio had butchered the material when his television play was used as the basis for a theatrical movie, so he wanted to return to the story for a more accurate rendition. At the time of his original teleplay with Newman, it was thought that the real Billy was left handed. This was based on a photo of Billy that had been inadvertently flipped when printed. Years later, the error was discovered—Billy was right handed.

== Reception ==
Billy the Kid was regarded highly by some due to its comparative historical fidelity. The critic Derek Winnert noted that the "intelligent script by Gore Vidal and thoughtful handling by William A Graham produce an upmarket, good-looking TV film that impresses without exciting greatly. The film is recognised as one of the most historically accurate Billy the Kid films, though that is not saying much as most of them have taken plenty of liberties with history." Kilmer was praised for his portrayal based on his extensive work to not only physically resemble William Bonney as much as possible, but also to capture his personality as related in historical accounts.

== See also ==
- Young Guns, 1988 film
- List of works about Billy the Kid
