= Paint It Black (1989 film) =

1989 film by Tim Hunter

- Directed by: Tim Hunter
- Written by: Michael Drexler; A.H. Zacharias
- Starring: Rick Rossovich; Sally Kirkland; Doug Savant; Julie Carmen; Martin Landau
- Cinematography: Mark Irwin
- Edited by: Curtiss Clayton
- Music by: Jürgen Knieper
- Production company: Vestron Pictures
- Distributed by: Avid Home Entertainment; Vestron Video
- Release dates: May 1989 (Cannes Film Festival); March 28, 1990 (video)
- Running time: 104 minutes
- Country: United States
- Language: English

Paint It Black is a 1989 American thriller film directed by Tim Hunter and starring Rick Rossovich, Sally Kirkland, Doug Savant, Julie Carmen, and Martin Landau. The film is about a struggling California artist who becomes a suspect after a serial killer murders his gallery-owner lover. It was released to Vestron Video and is one of the company's last titles before it folded.

The film had a troubled production history, as the original director Roger Holzberg was replaced by Hunter following his work on the acclaimed River's Edge. The script underwent so many changes that writers Timothy Harris and Herschel Weingrod chose to be credited in the finished film under the pseudonyms Michael Drexler and A.H. Zacharias.

== Plot ==
Jonathan Dunbar is a metal sculptor who works at a Santa Barbara art gallery. He is involved with the gallery owner Marion Easton, who keeps the sole rights to his work and promises to give him a one-man show for his art. Jonathan meets Eric Hinsley, a wealthy but psychotic art collector who is responsible for a string of burglaries and assaults. Eric becomes obsessed with Jonathan's creations and murders Marion in order to help him. Jonathan, however, becomes the suspect in the crime, due to him breaking into Marion's office on the night of her murder and scrutinizing her ledgers to confirm that she'd been cheating him. Marion's associate Gregory Paul has an incriminating business card that Jonathan dropped during his break-in, and he manages to successfully blackmail Jonathan with it. Soon, Gregory ends up dead too.

Meanwhile, art-broker Daniel Lambert takes a serious interest in Jonathan and sells one of his sculptures to a business magnate. Eric, wanting the piece for himself, tries to kill Lambert, but Jonathan foils the murder attempt. Knowing now that Eric is guilty but fearing the killer will frame him with the incriminating business card, Jonathan doesn't go to the police. Instead, he and his girlfriend, Gina Bayworth, go to Eric's mansion to look for the card.

== Cast ==
- Rick Rossovich as Jonathan Dunbar
- Doug Savant as Eric Hinsley
- Julie Carmen as Gina Bayworth
- Sally Kirkland as Maria Easton
- Martin Landau as Daniel Lambert
- Peter Frechette as Gregory
- Jason Bernard as Lieutenant Wilder
- Monique van de Ven as Kyla Leif
- Marion Eaton as Lenore Hinsley
- Andy Romano as Mark Cuniff
- John Fujioka as Mr Lee
- Mike Kimmel as Minister
- Claudia Robinson as Mrs. Wilder

== Critical reception ==
TV Guide wrote the film is "a retrograde attempt to revive the Alfred Hitchcock thrillers of yore (especially Strangers on a Train), with an unfortunate emphasis on artifice and contrivance". It criticized the technical aspects and plot elements, while noting Rossovich isn't given much to do. John Hartl of The Seattle Times said, "While it's no 'Strangers on a Train,' I thought 'Paint It Black' succeeded on Hunter's terms - it's an entertaining potboiler - and it's full of eccentric dark-comedy touches and good performances (as well as a couple of gratuitously gruesome touches). Kirkland is watchable as always, and Savant really takes off, fulfilling the promise he showed in 'Masquerade.'"
