= Night Ride Home (film) =

- Video release artwork
- Genre: Drama
- Based on: Night Ride Home by Barbara Esstman
- Teleplay by: Ronald Parker; Darrah Cloud
- Directed by: Glenn Jordan
- Starring: Rebecca De Mornay; Keith Carradine; Ellen Burstyn; Thora Birch
- Music by: Bruce Broughton
- Country of origin: United States
- Original language: English

Production
- Executive producer: Richard Welsh
- Producer: Glenn Jordan
- Cinematography: Neil Roach
- Editor: David Simmons
- Running time: 94 minutes
- Production company: Hallmark Hall of Fame Productions

Original release
- Network: CBS
- Release: February 7, 1999

Night Ride Home is a 1999 American drama television film directed by Glenn Jordan and written by Ronald Parker and Darrah Cloud, based on the 1997 novel of the same name by Barbara Esstman. It stars Rebecca De Mornay, Keith Carradine, Ellen Burstyn, and Thora Birch. Its plot follows a family coping with the death of their son, which his sister inadvertently caused. It aired on CBS on February 7, 1999, as an episode of the Hallmark Hall of Fame anthology series.

== Cast ==
- Rebecca De Mornay as Nora Mahler
- Keith Carradine as Neal Mahler
- Ellen Burstyn as Maggie
- Thora Birch as Clea Mahler
- Lynne Thigpen as Fran
- Ryan Merriman as Justin
- Jordan Brower as Simon
- Rosanna Huffman as Iris
- Ramon De Ocampo as Luis

== Production ==
Filming took place in Portland, Oregon.

== Critical response ==
David Kronke of Variety praised the film as a "handsome, intelligent and well-burnished production," and a "thoughtful and sensitive examination of how a family copes with grief." Terry Kelleher of People compared the film negatively against the 1980 film Ordinary People. Don Heckman of the Los Angeles Times criticized the film's screenplay, noting "the presentation of these issues is far too calculated, and their solutions far too quickly accomplished. The script’s simplistic method of resolving what in real life would be significant emotional trauma is to provide a cathartic scene that almost immediately prompts a change in characters." Ron Wertheimer of The New York Times praised the film, writing that "Night Ride Home has the courage to depict imperfect people who are walloped by a heartbreaking loss and emerge only slightly wiser and no more perfect than before. The centerpiece of the film... is the quietly disturbing performance of Rebecca De Mornay."
