= The Gingerbread Lady =

1970 play by Neil Simon

- Original language: English
- Written by: Neil Simon
- Genre: Drama
- Setting: New York City

Premiere
- Date: 1970
- Place: Plymouth Theatre

The Gingerbread Lady is a play by Neil Simon. It was widely believed to have been written specifically for actress Maureen Stapleton, who won both the Tony Award and Drama Desk Award for her performance. But in a later autobiography, Simon wrote that he'd feared Stapleton might be "hurt" if she assumed the character's flaws and personal damage were a direct dramatization of her life. Simon said that it was director Mike Nichols' suggestion to cast Stapleton in the role, and that Simon responded, "This is not really Maureen. It's ten, twenty different actresses I've met over the years."

== Productions ==
The Gingerbread Lady opened on Broadway at the Plymouth Theatre on December 13, 1970 and closed on May 29, 1971, after 193 performances and 12 previews. Directed by Robert Moore the cast featured, in addition to Maureen Stapleton, Betsy von Furstenberg (Toby Landau), Michael Lombard (Jimmy Perry), Ayn Ruymen (Polly Meare) and Charles Siebert (Lou Tanner). It proved to be one of Simon's least successful plays on Broadway. The production used costume designs by Frank Thompson.

Stapleton won the 1971 Tony Award for Best Actress in a Play, while Ruymen won a Theatre World Award.

In the UK, the play premiered at the Theatre Royal Windsor on June 25, 1974 with Elaine Stritch in the lead, and Vivien Merchant, Kevin Lindsay, Stephen Greif and Jenny Quayle in support. The production belatedly transferred to the Phoenix Theatre in London's West End on October 23, with Merchant and Greif replaced by Sarah Marshall and Blain Fairman. Like the Broadway version, this one ran for just over five months.

The play was revived by the Equity Library Theater (New York City) in 1987.

== Plot overview ==
A major departure from Simon's previous lighthearted plays, The Gingerbread Lady was a dark drama with comic overtones centering on Evy Meara, a cabaret singer whose career, marriage, and health all have been destroyed by alcohol. Alvin Klein noted that "The play was Mr. Simon's first attempt to play it straight and serious."

Having just completed a ten-week stint in a rehab facility to overcome her addiction, she returns home to the welcome of friends with their own problems. These include Toby, an overly vain woman who fears the loss of her looks and Jimmy, a gay actor in danger of losing a part in a play, her devoted but anxious teenaged daughter, and a worthless ex-lover. Finally, after some difficulties, Evy's daughter continues her attempt to rescue her and manages to arrange a meeting with her father, the three of them together.

== Film ==
In 1981, Simon adapted his play as a film with the title Only When I Laugh, starring his then-wife Marsha Mason in the lead role.; Mason received an Academy Award nomination as Best Actress in a Leading Role. Supporting actors James Coco and Joan Hackett were also nominated.

According to Susan Fehrenbacher Koprince (associate professor of English at the University of North Dakota, Grand Forks), the film "is radically changed" from the play, and used "less than half" of the play. For example, the former nightclub singer Evy becomes Georgia, "a divorced actress who is battling alcoholism as she struggles to establish a closer relationship with her daughter." Georgia, unlike Evy, is not a nymphomaniac and is not as self-destructive. Koprince concludes that the optimistic ending for the film is "more plausible" than the "tacked-on happy ending to the play".

== Reception ==
According to Thomas S. Hischak, "critics were mixed in their reaction, one stating that Simon's 'characteristic wit and humor are at their brilliant best, and his serious story of lost misfits can often be genuinely and deeply touching' but another noting that 'what is written is not serious but earnest.'" They "all lauded Stapleton's penetrating performance." The play ran "a disappointing five months, the shortest run yet for a Simon play."
