= Fright Night Part 2 =

1988 film by Tommy Lee Wallace

- Theatrical release poster
- Directed by: Tommy Lee Wallace
- Written by: Tommy Lee Wallace; Tim Metcalfe; Miguel Tejada-Flores
- Based on: Characters by Tom Holland
- Produced by: Herb Jaffe; Mort Engelberg; Miguel Tejada-Flores
- Starring: Roddy McDowall; William Ragsdale; Traci Lind; Julie Carmen
- Cinematography: Mark Irwin
- Edited by: Jay Lash Cassidy
- Music by: Brad Fiedel
- Distributed by: New Century/Vista (North America); Tri-Star Pictures (International)
- Release dates: December 8, 1988 (Australia); May 19, 1989 (U.S.)
- Running time: 103 minutes
- Country: United States
- Language: English
- Budget: $8 million
- Box office: $2.9 million

Fright Night Part 2 is a 1988 American supernatural horror film directed by Tommy Lee Wallace, and a sequel to the 1985 film Fright Night. Roddy McDowall and William Ragsdale reprise their roles as Peter Vincent and Charley Brewster, alongside new cast members Traci Lind, Julie Carmen and Jon Gries. Composer Brad Fiedel also returned with another distinct synthesizer score.

Following the plot of the first film, it focuses on Charley who, now a college student, encounters a group of vampires led by a beautiful woman who is seeking him out. Released by New Century/Vista in North America and TriStar Pictures elsewhere in 1989, the film grossed almost $3 million domestically, and has since become a cult film like its predecessor.

In 2003, it received a brief issuing on DVD by Artisan Entertainment in a full frame presentation, but the release quickly went out of print and has since become a rare collector's item. Due to rights issues at the time, the film has not had a domestic home video release since, but has become a common bootleg. As of 2025 however, the rights have been cleared and a 4K/Blu-ray release is set for release by Synapse Films in 2026.

== Plot ==
Three years after surviving an attack by vampire Jerry Dandrige, (Note: As depicted in Fright Night (1985).) Charley Brewster is now a college student undergoing psychiatric therapy. Convinced that vampires are not real, he believes Dandrige was merely a serial killer. Charley is dating Alex Young, a psychology student, and the two visit his old friend Peter Vincent, now back to hosting Fright Night, his late-night horror show.

During the visit, Charley sees mysterious crates being delivered and encounters four strange individuals, one of whom—Regine—immediately captivates him. That night, Charley dreams of Regine visiting and biting him. His therapist, Dr. Harrison, assures him it is just a side effect of trauma. Later, Charley spots his friend Richie Green entering Regine's apartment and witnesses what appears to be Richie being drained of blood by Regine and her companion Belle. Horrified, he runs to Peter, and the two crash a party at Regine's penthouse.

At the party, Richie appears unharmed, and Regine claims to be a performance artist. She seduces Charley with a hypnotic dance, while Peter notices that she casts no reflection—a telltale vampire trait. Outside the party, Regine reveals her true identity to Peter: she is Jerry Dandrige's sister and has come for revenge. Peter flees, shaken.

That night, Regine visits Charley while he sleeps and bites him. He continues denying what is happening, but starts to show signs of transformation—aversion to garlic and sunlight. After learning that Richie's body has turned up, Charley finally accepts the truth. Meanwhile, Regine's minions—Louie, Belle, and the bug-eating Bozworth—begin stalking Alex.

Peter tries to warn Charley and Alex, but they dismiss him. Peter is later arrested after attempting to kill Regine on live TV, who has taken over Fright Night. Alex and Charley are also arrested during a run-in with Louie. Dr. Harrison bails Alex out, only to reveal he, too, is a vampire. Alex kills him and breaks Peter out of the psychiatric hospital with the help of a sympathetic patient.

Alex and Peter race to Regine's lair to rescue Charley, who was bailed out by Regine and is on the verge of becoming a vampire. Together, they defeat Regine's vampire gang in a series of battles. Regine attempts to escape into her coffin, but finds it lined with Communion wafers. In the final confrontation, Peter exposes her to sunlight, destroying her.

In the aftermath, Charley and Alex joke about their experience, acknowledging that no one would believe what they have been through. As they embrace, the sound of a bat flying off suggests the vampire threat may not be over.

== Cast ==
- Roddy McDowall as Peter Vincent
- William Ragsdale as Charley Brewster
- Traci Lind as Alex Young
- Julie Carmen as Regine Dandrige
- Jon Gries as Louie
- Russell Clark as Belle
- Brian Thompson as Bozworth
- Merritt Butrick as Richie Green
- Ernie Sabella as Dr. Harrison
- Josh Richman as Fritzy
- Blair Tefkin as Bernice

== Production ==
After the critical and financial success of Fright Night, producer Herb Jaffe retained the screen rights to the characters and pushed for a sequel to be made. Although he was unhappy that the budget was drastically slashed, original director Tom Holland was interested, but Chris Sarandon and he were both tied up making Child's Play, and could not commit to the film, though new director Tommy Lee Wallace sought out Holland for advice and Sarandon visited the set while they were shooting.

The original script featured the characters Evil Ed and Charley's girlfriend Amy. Stephen Geoffreys turned down the role due to disliking the script and being offered the lead in 976-EVIL, which was scheduled to shoot at the same time. Amanda Bearse was busy with her television sitcom series Married... with Children, so a new girlfriend, Alex (portrayed by Traci Lind), was written for Charley. In the end, only Ragsdale and McDowall reprised their roles, and a new set of villains was devised.

== Release ==
=== Box office ===
Shortly before filming began, the producers of the film sold foreign distribution rights to Tri-Star Pictures, the sister studio of Columbia Pictures, the studio that released the original film. The film was first released in Australia by Tri-Star, where its box office was modest, grossing $102,380 in its opening week. Unlike the first film, the sequel saw a very limited release in the US by distributor New Century/Vista. The film was only released on 148 screens and brought in only $548,231 on its opening weekend. Its domestic gross was $2,983,784.

=== Critical reception ===
Unlike its predecessor, Fright Night Part 2 received lukewarm reviews, currently holding a 43% on review aggregator website Rotten Tomatoes based on 23 reviews.

=== Accolades ===
Award	Nominee	Subject	Result
Saturn Award	Julie Carmen	Best Actress	Nominated

== Home media ==
International Video Entertainment (IVE, now known today as Lions Gate Home Entertainment) released the film on videocassette in 1989. In Australia, CBS/Fox Video released it to videocassette as a coffin-shaped VHS cover. The film was released on DVD by Artisan Entertainment on August 19, 2003, though the DVD soon went out of print. The transfer on the DVD was criticized for being of a low quality, apparently lifted from a VHS print of the film, and the DVD case also falsely claimed the film was presented in its "original" 1.33:1 pan-and-scan transfer, despite the fact that the film was shot on Panavision.

A high definition transfer in the original aspect ratio was created for television airings. This transfer has been used to create widescreen, bootleg DVDs and Blu-rays of the film, due to the unavailability and low quality of the official DVD.

According to a 2018 article in Bloody Disgusting, the film's home video rights were left in limbo due to a hasty restructuring of New Century/Vista, following the murder of its head of distribution, José Menendez.

On March 6, 2025, Michael Felsher of Red Shirt Pictures announced on Facebook that the rights to the film were cleared and sorted out and a North American 4K/Blu-ray release is set for a release with a new 4K restoration and extras sometime in 2026 through Synapse Films. Director Tommy Lee Wallace will be involved in the release along with creator Tom Holland contributing.

== Future ==
Roddy McDowall relished playing Peter Vincent and was eager to bring original creator and director Tom Holland back to the franchise, so he had set up a meeting for himself and Holland with Carolco Pictures chairman José Menendez. However, before that meeting could occur, Menendez and his wife were murdered by their sons, Lyle and Erik. Not only did this stop another sequel, it also interfered with the release of Fright Night Part 2, which attained extremely limited theatrical distribution before being dumped, briefly, to home video by Carolco's subsidiary, Live Entertainment.

In January 2017, Tom Holland announced that he was writing a Fright Night 3 novel and that in 2019 he would obtain the rights to the franchise and that a third film would be happening. This would follow the continuity of the original 1985 Fright Night and its 1988 sequel without anything to do with the 2011 or 2013 films.

On October 28, 2020, original Fright Night director Tom Holland confirmed that he is writing a direct sequel to Fright Night titled Fright Night: Resurrection. This sequel would ignore the 1988 sequel and be a proper sequel to his original film. Holland said he wants to bring back the original characters as well saying "Of course, Charlie's back, and so is Evil Ed. I'm bringing back everybody I can. I'm calling it Resurrection because we’ve got to resurrect Billy Cole and Jerry Dandridge. And now I'll say no more." Holland went on to say "part of the issue with the attempts at sequels and remakes is that the movie itself was kind of a singular idea, and a follow-up needed to be more than just set in the same world -- it needed to draw from the same set of inspirations and follow a similar thematic thread."

Regine Dandridge actress Julie Carmen confirmed that she contributed to in depth interviews about working with director Tommy Lee Wallace and actors William Ragsdale, Roddy McDowell, and costume designer Joseph Porro in the '80s horror documentary You're So Cool Brewster and in In Search of Darkness III, in addition to author Adrian Roe's books Second Scream and First Scream to the Last.

== See also ==
- Vampire film
