= Private Parts (1972 film) =

1972 film by Paul Bartel

- Theatrical release poster
- Directed by: Paul Bartel
- Written by: Philip Kearney; Les Rendelstein; Paul Bartel (uncredited)
- Produced by: Gene Corman
- Starring: Ayn Ruymen; Lucille Benson; John Ventantonio
- Cinematography: Andrew Davis
- Edited by: Morton Tubor
- Music by: Hugo Friedhofer
- Production companies: Metro-Goldwyn-Mayer; Penelope Productions, Inc.
- Distributed by: Premier Productions
- Release date: September 8, 1972
- Running time: 87 minutes
- Country: United States
- Language: English

Private Parts is a 1972 American horror film directed by Paul Bartel in his feature film debut, and starring Ayn Ruymen, Lucille Benson, and John Ventantonio. Its plot follows a troubled young woman who suspects a deviant serial killer is living in her aunt's dilapidated hotel in downtown Los Angeles. The film has been noted for its stylistic mixture of horror, dark comedy, and psychological thriller elements.

== Plot ==
Cheryl Stratton gets into an argument with her roommate Judy, and decides to move out. Cheryl steals Judy's wallet and, rather than return to her native Ohio, visits the King Edward Hotel, a dilapidated hotel in downtown Los Angeles that is operated by her maternal Aunt Martha, whom she has never met. The brusque, conservative Martha allows Cheryl to temporarily stay in the King Edward, which she considers one of the "last respectable hotels in the city." Martha's central provision for Cheryl's stay is that she not wander the hotel at night. Cheryl soon notices that the guests and residents of the hotel are very unusual.

Soon after settling into her room, Cheryl senses she is being watched. Judy's boyfriend, Mike, arrives at the hotel searching for Cheryl, and is met by the Reverend Moon, an eccentric guest who dresses as a priest. Mike is attacked in an upstairs hallway by an unseen assailant, who decapitates him before throwing his corpse in the hotel furnace. Later, over dinner, Cheryl inquires about Martha's daughter; Martha states that the child was conceived via artificial insemination, and implies that she is dead.

Cheryl soon takes notice of George, a mysterious, handsome photographer who lives in the hotel, and whom Martha allows to keep a darkroom in the basement. While exploring the hotel, Cheryl realizes there are peepholes throughout, some of which allow a direct view into her room. George begins to leave sexually aggressive notes for Cheryl, which progress to gifts of lingerie which he suggest she model for him. Curious, Cheryl steals the hotel master keys and has copies made, which she uses to enter George's room. Inside, she discovers a transparent inflatable sex doll on his bed, and numerous avant-garde photos of nude women lining the walls.

Judy arrives at the hotel searching for Mike and wanting to reclaim her stolen money. Martha directs her to the basement darkroom, where an unseen assailant murders her. That night, Jeff, a young man who works at the locksmith where Cheryl copied the keys, invites her on a date to a rock concert. Meanwhile, George fills his inflatable sex doll with water and affixes a blown-up headshot of Cheryl onto its face. He then draws his own blood into a hypodermic needle, before injecting the blood into the doll.

George and Martha later get into an argument in which George accuses her of ruining his life by attempting to "protect" him from slatternly women. That night, Cheryl dresses in the lingerie George left for her, and erotically undresses in the bathroom, aware George is watching her from a peephole. After she leaves her room, George enters it and takes back the lingerie, which he uses to dress his inflatable doll. Martha finds the discarded doll in the trash the next morning, and orders Cheryl to return home. Jeff arrives later for his date with Cheryl. As they head to the concert, Jeff mentions he previously dated a woman named Alice, a model who disappeared from the hotel, and mentions that she was frightened of George. Cheryl, who feels protective of George, is angered by this and aborts the date, returning to the hotel.

Jeff follows Cheryl to the hotel, and confronts George, who is in his room listening to a taped audio recording of Alice's murder. George bludgeons Jeff with a bottle and drags his body to the darkroom. When he returns to his room, he finds Cheryl posed on his bed in the lingerie. Cheryl assumes the two are going to have sex, but is horrified when George produces a hypodermic needle, which he attempts to stab her with. An altercation ensues in which Cheryl inadvertently kills him by pushing over a large stage light that falls on his head. Martha, alerted by the noise, enters the room. When she unbuttons George's shirt to feel for a heartbeat, she reveals that George has breasts, and is not a man at all, but a woman who has been cross-dressing and presenting as a male. Martha raves that George's spirit has been liberated from his body, and that she raised George—who is her biological child—as a man so that he would not be "tainted" by wanton female sexuality. Martha briefly suggests that Cheryl become her "new son", but swiftly changes her mind, attacking Cheryl with a large butcher knife.

The next day, Jeff's father arrives at the hotel with police, who recover an unconscious Jeff in the darkroom, alongside Judy's corpse. Upstairs, they discover George's body alongside Martha's, which is now dressed in Cheryl's lingerie outfit. Later, as the police depart the hotel, Cheryl emerges from upstairs in a daze, repeating to herself Martha's phrase that the King Edward is "one of the last respectable hotels in the city" and that she must be "extremely selective" about its clientele.

== Cast ==
- Ayn Ruymen as Cheryl Stratton
- Lucille Benson as Aunt Martha Atwood
- John Ventantonio as George Atwood
- Laurie Main as Reverend Moon
- Stanley Livingston as Jeff
- Charles Woolf as Jeff's dad
- Ann Gibbs as Judy
- Len Travis as Mike
- Dorothy Neumann as Mrs. Quigley
- Gene Simms as First policeman
- John Lupton as Second policeman
- Patrick Strong as Artie

Cast notes:

- Director Paul Bartel had an uncredited bit part as Mr. Lovejoy, a drunk who lives in the hotel.

== Production ==
=== Development ===
The film was written by Philip Kearney and Les Rendelstein, based on real-life people they had met in Los Angeles in the 1960s. Producer Chuck Hirsch showed the script to Paul Bartel, who had made the shorts The Secret Cinema and Naughty Nurses. Bartel optioned the script and rewrote it. Bartel intended to make the film in New York for $65,000. Then his agent sent the script to Gene Corman who liked it, and Bartel's films. Corman succeeded in raising finance from MGM. "I was so pleased," said Bartel later. "I thought my career was made."

Bartel said "It was basically a horror film touched with comedy. I shot it as a horror film and then ten minutes before the climax I cut away and made it a pure comedy."

=== Casting ===
The role of Aunt Martha, played by Lucille Benson, was intended for Mary Astor.

=== Filming ===
Location shooting took place in the King Edward Hotel near Skid Row, Los Angeles. Bartel said "the production went very smoothly."

Private Parts began with the working title "Blood Relations"; the change came at the order of Metro-Goldwyn-Mayer (MGM) studio head James Aubrey, but Private Parts as a title was problematic because some newspapers would not print it; in Chicago, the film was advertised as Private Arts.

== Release ==
When the film was test-screened for audiences, the results were so bad that MGM—who had acquired the film in July 1972—decided to release the film under their Premier Productions subsidiary, along with two standard horror films; it was then shelved. Nevertheless, the film was copyrighted by MGM and not Premier Productions.

Bartel said "I thought it was sophisticated and delightful but for the people who came to see the film and viewed it from a very basic level, it didn't work. They resented the abrupt change of mood and were not able to accept the comedy. You had to be detached from the film and not take it seriously in order to appreciate what I did with the film."

Despite MGM's lack of interest in promoting the property, the studio passed on the opportunity to sell it to Roger Corman's New World Pictures when they expressed interest in buying it. The film did not perform well at the box office. In the United Kingdom, it was granted an X rating.

=== Critical response ===
Roger Greenspun of The New York Times wrote:

[Bartel] succeeds in some details and fails in others. But the attempt, even when it isn't quite working, is a good deal more interesting than most... Private Parts is at least a hopeful occasion for those of us who love intellectual cinema and at the same time care for the menacing staircase, for the ominous shadow, for empty rooms shuttered against the light of the afternoon ...Bartel is a young director whose previous short films have shown a genius of title (Secret Cinema, Naughty Nurse) not entirely matched by their content. Private Parts is no triumph, but it does mark a giant step forward toward the successful blending of precocious perversity and satiric good sense that seems the fated direction of his career.

The Philadelphia Daily News's Joe Baltake praised the film's cinematography and Bartel's "stylish" direction, describing it as "a veritable spook carnival about a seedy L.A. hotel brimming with eerie corridors, creaking doors and strange tenants who are into all sorts of perversions... Private Parts, in total, is a very high-class addition to the horror film genre—every bit as scarey [sic] and arty as Roman Polanski's Repulsion. It's well worth seeing."

Will Jones of the Star Tribune wrote of the film: "A great deal of skill and technique have been lavished on all this trashy nonsense, and with Ms. Benson's wholehearted and enthusiastic devotion to the role of freaky old Aunt Martha, who turns out to be freakier than any of her guests, it has the look of well-made, high quality trash."

Reviewing it in a 1978 release, the Los Angeles Times called it "a stylish, actually bravura piece of Grand Guignol that could be sick if it weren't so hilarious."

In a retrospective assessment, Bruce Reid of The Stranger noted the film as being ahead of its time, writing: "Private Parts knew America was full of lonely, sex-obsessed misfits a decade before David Lynch came on the scene." The film was included in the 2003 book Fangoria's 101 Best Horror Movies You've Never Seen: A Celebration of the World's Most Unheralded Fright Flicks.

=== Home media ===
MGM/UA Video released a VHS edition of Private Parts in 1991. Warner Bros. Home Entertainment released the film on DVD in 2005. On April 2, 2023, Scream Factory announced a forthcoming Blu-ray edition, which was released on June 6, 2023.

== See also ==
- List of American films of 1972

== Sources ==
- Armstrong, Stephen B. (2017). Paul Bartel: The Life and Films. Jefferson, North Carolina: McFarland. ISBN 978-0-786-49915-1.
- DeCoteau, David; Del Valle, David (2023). Private Parts (Blu-ray audio commentary). Scream Factory.
- LoBrutto, Vincent (2021). The Seventies: The Decade That Changed American Film Forever. Lanham, Maryland: Rowman & Littlefield. ISBN 978-1-538-13719-2.
- Lukeman, Adam (2003). Fangoria's 101 Best Horror Movies You've Never Seen: A Celebration of the World's Most Unheralded Fright Flicks. New York City, New York: Three Rivers Press. ISBN 978-1-400-04749-9.
