= The Finnish Line =

- Genre: Romantic comedy
- Teleplay by: John Bellina; Talia Gonzalez; Nicole Drespel
- Directed by: Dustin Rikert
- Starring: Kim Matula; Beau Mirchoff; Nichole Sakura
- Music by: Sami Goldberg; Kara Talve
- Countries of origin: United States; Iceland
- Original language: English

Production
- Executive producer: Andrew Gernhard
- Producers: Bui Baldvinsson; Arnar Knutsson; Molly M. Mayeux
- Cinematography: Tómas Örn Tómasson
- Editor: Bryan Capri
- Running time: 84 minutes
- Production company: Hallmark Media

Original release
- Network: Hallmark Channel
- Release: December 1, 2024

The Finnish Line is a 2024 American romantic comedy Christmas television film directed by Dustin Rikert. It tells the story of Anya, a Finnish-American woman who, following in her late father's footsteps, arrives in Finnish Lapland to participate in a sled dog competition. The film stars Kim Matula, Beau Mirchoff and Nichole Sakura.

The film was shot in Iceland and also in Finnish Lapland, such as in the Santa Claus Village located in Rovaniemi. The film was broadcast on the Hallmark Channel on 1 December 2024.

== Cast ==
- Kim Matula as Anya Kivelä
  - Hildur Karitas Einarsdóttir as Young Anya
- Beau Mirchoff as Cole Olsen
- Nichole Sakura as Elyse
- Benedikt Gröndal as Lavi
- Páll Sigþór Pálsson as Monty White
- Hinrik Ólafsson as Jaak
- Arnar Dan Kristjánsson as Beckett Turtledove
- Hjörtur Jóhann Jónsson as Bryce Turtledove
- Tinna Björt Guðjónsdóttir as Nitaro Mendez
- Kolbrún Helga Friðriksdóttir as Willa
- Níels Thibaud Girerd as Reporter
- Gretar Bjarnarson as Uncle Ollie
- Ragnheiður Steindórsdóttir as Aunt Hilma
- Vaatu Kervinen as Young Child
- Ingi Hrafn Hilmarsson as Hans Kivelä
- Telma Huld Jóhannesdóttir as Mother
- Pyry Puurunen as Santa Claus

== See also ==
- List of Hallmark Channel Original Movies
- List of Christmas films
