= Ronald Parker =

American screenwriter

Ronald Parker is an American television screenwriter and film producer. He is the co-author of the made-for-TV productions Joan of Arc, Nuremberg, and Hatfields & McCoys.

== Early life ==
Parker grew up in Hutchinson, Kansas, and graduated from Hutchinson High School. He received his journalism degree from the University of Kansas in 1972.

== Career ==
Shortly after graduating from KU, he was hired as a literary consultant by Hollywood talent agency Creative Management Associates. He left to become personal manager to actress Sarah Miles and writer Robert Bolt. After that, he went to New York to run the theatrical production office of producer Robert Fryer and raise financing for the original Broadway productions of Bob Fosse's Chicago and Alan Ayckbourn's The Norman Conquests.

He returned to Los Angeles to be Director of Development at The Producer Circle Company, where his projects included The Shining and The Boys From Brazil.

As Vice President of Creative Affairs at boutique studio Marble Arch Productions, his projects included The Muppet Movie, Sophie's Choice, and On Golden Pond.

Parker turned to producing, with films My Stepmother is an Alien directed by Richard Benjamin and starring Dan Aykroyd and Kim Basinger, Thursday's Child with Gena Rowlands and Rob Lowe, Legs with Gwen Verdon and John Heard, and The Fighter with Gregory Harrison.

During the 1990s he began to focus on screenwriting, with 18 produced movies and miniseries, including Joan of Arc with Leelee Sobieski and Peter O'Toole, and Nuremberg with Alec Baldwin and Christopher Plummer. In 2012, he was nominated for a Primetime Emmy Award for Outstanding Writing for a Miniseries, Movie or a Dramatic Special for his screenplay on Hatfields & McCoys. He also won a Writers Guild Award for Hatfields & McCoys. Other writing credits include Night Ride Home with Rebecca De Mornay, Keith Carradine and Ellen Burstyn; The William Coit Story with Bonnie Bedelia and Neil Patrick Harris; The Price of Love with Peter Facinelli and Jay R. Ferguson; Gone in a Heartbeat with James Marsden; and Gargantua with Emile Hirsch and Adam Baldwin. He has also done uncredited writing on several limited series, including the eight-hour Napoleon with John Malkovich, Isabella Rossellini, and Gérard Depardieu.

Parker was a producer on the Emmy-winning miniseries Broken Trail starring Robert Duvall and directed by Walter Hill.

He has taught screenwriting at the University of Southern California.
