= Queen Sized =

2008 television film directed by Peter Levin

- DVD cover
- Written by: Rodney Johnson
- Directed by: Peter Levin
- Starring: Nikki Blonsky; Annie Potts; Kimberly Matula
- Country of origin: United States
- Original language: English

Production
- Producer: Frank von Zerneck
- Cinematography: Neil Roach
- Editor: Anita Brandt-Burgoyne
- Running time: 112 minutes
- Production companies: Von Zerneck/Sertner Films; Starz Media; Lifetime Pictures

Original release
- Network: Lifetime
- Release: January 12, 2008

Queen Sized is a Lifetime drama telefilm that premiered on January 12, 2008, starring Nikki Blonsky. The movie was made in Shreveport, LA.

== Plot ==
Maggie Baker (Blonsky) is an overweight teenage girl in suburban South Carolina who is ridiculed at school and badgered to lose weight by her overbearing mother Joan (Annie Potts) who is worried Maggie will get diabetes like her late father.

Maggie's best friend Casey (Lily Holleman) gets them invited to a party hosted by the popular clique. At the party, Casey is dragged away by her boyfriend, leaving Maggie alone to be bullied by mean girl Liz (Liz McGeever) and her friends, who take unflattering photographs of Maggie accidentally spilling food on her shirt. Maggie goes to the kitchen to clean up where she is helped by her friend and crush Louis (Fabian C. Moreno) and Tara (Kim Matula), one of the few popular girls who is kind. After Tara leaves, Casey remarks that Tara is only being nice so she can win Homecoming Queen. Maggie’s mother caught her sneaking into the house while she was supposed to babysit her brother and punished her for it. The two agree that it would be nice if a regular girl like them won. Liz overhears and decides to nominate Maggie as a joke.

To everyone's surprise, including Maggie's, many students support Maggie's nomination. Maggie easily collects 150 signatures to put herself on the ballot even after her first batch of signatures is stolen. She becomes an official nominee alongside Tara. With Casey's help, Maggie's campaign is a success and she gets a boost in self-confidence. But Joan is not very supportive and tries to discourage Maggie from spending too much energy on the campaign. At school, Maggie sees Tara's expensive campaign posters in the hallway, and imagines her mom praising Tara's thinness and beauty. She becomes depressed and binges on food. Joan finds Maggie and comforts her. Maggie considers withdrawing from the race but decides to continue on.

Liz vandalizes Tara's posters and Maggie is accused of sabotage and threatened with suspension. Joan defends Maggie and insists on Maggie staying in the race especially since there is no proof that Maggie destroyed the posters. The Homecoming Queen vote proceeds and Maggie wins. Tara sincerely congratulates Maggie and a local reporter interviews Maggie about her win. The attention goes to Maggie's head and she brushes off Casey in favor of preparing for the dance.

Liz and Tara's boyfriend Trip (Kyle Russell Clements) conspire to get Maggie to resign and sabotage the Homecoming float so that when Maggie sits on the throne, it looks like Maggie's weight broke it. Tara is outraged and dumps both Trip and Liz for being bullies. Meanwhile, Maggie goes on local television to discuss her win but comes off as rude and ungrateful towards her friends and supporters. Casey confronts Maggie on becoming stuck up since her win and neglecting their friendship. Maggie shoves her into a row of bikes, and she is suspended from school. The school tells Maggie that she can still proceed as Homecoming Queen but Maggie decides to resign, as she feels she doesn't deserve the position anymore.

At home, Maggie imagines her mother criticizing her again but then realizes that she is her own harshest critic. She decides to attend the Homecoming and take her place as queen. Joan reveals she contacted local businesses to give Maggie free hair, makeup, and dress styling for the dance. Maggie asks Louis to be her Homecoming King and she reconciles with Casey. At the Homecoming game, some people still boo and laugh at Maggie but she makes a speech to the crowd encouraging them to put aside stereotypes and be kind to each other. The crowd then cheers and Maggie realizes that while winning Homecoming Queen was a great victory, learning to love herself is what makes her happy.

== Cast ==
- Nikki Blonsky as Maggie Baker, an obese 17-year-old girl who hates her body but eventually learns to love and accept herself
- Annie Potts as Joan Baker, Maggie's overbearing mother
- Lily Holleman as Casey, Maggie's best friend
- Fabian C. Moreno as Louis Rodriguez, Maggie's friend and love interest
- Kim Matula as Tara Conner, the school's most popular girl, who is kind-hearted and admires Maggie
- Liz McGeever as Liz McDonavan, Tara's best friend and mean girl who hates Maggie and envies Tara
- Jackson Pace as William "Will" Baker, Maggie's younger brother
- Ryan Bartley as Emily Dosik, one of Tara's friends and dance organizer
- Kelsey Schultz as Camille, one of Tara's friends
- Kyle Clements as Trip, Tara's boyfriend
- Philip Searcy as Devon, Casey's boyfriend
- Laurel Whitsett as Coach Zash
- Tiger Sheu as Jared, the school punk
- Jessika Brodosi as Serena, the school goth
- Cody Linley, one of Devon's best friends
- Jabari Thomas as Dorian, one of Devon's best friends
- Libby Whittemore, Joan's best friend

== DVD release ==
Queen Sized was released on DVD for the first time on August 5, 2008 from Starz Home Entertainment
