= Kim Matula =

American actress

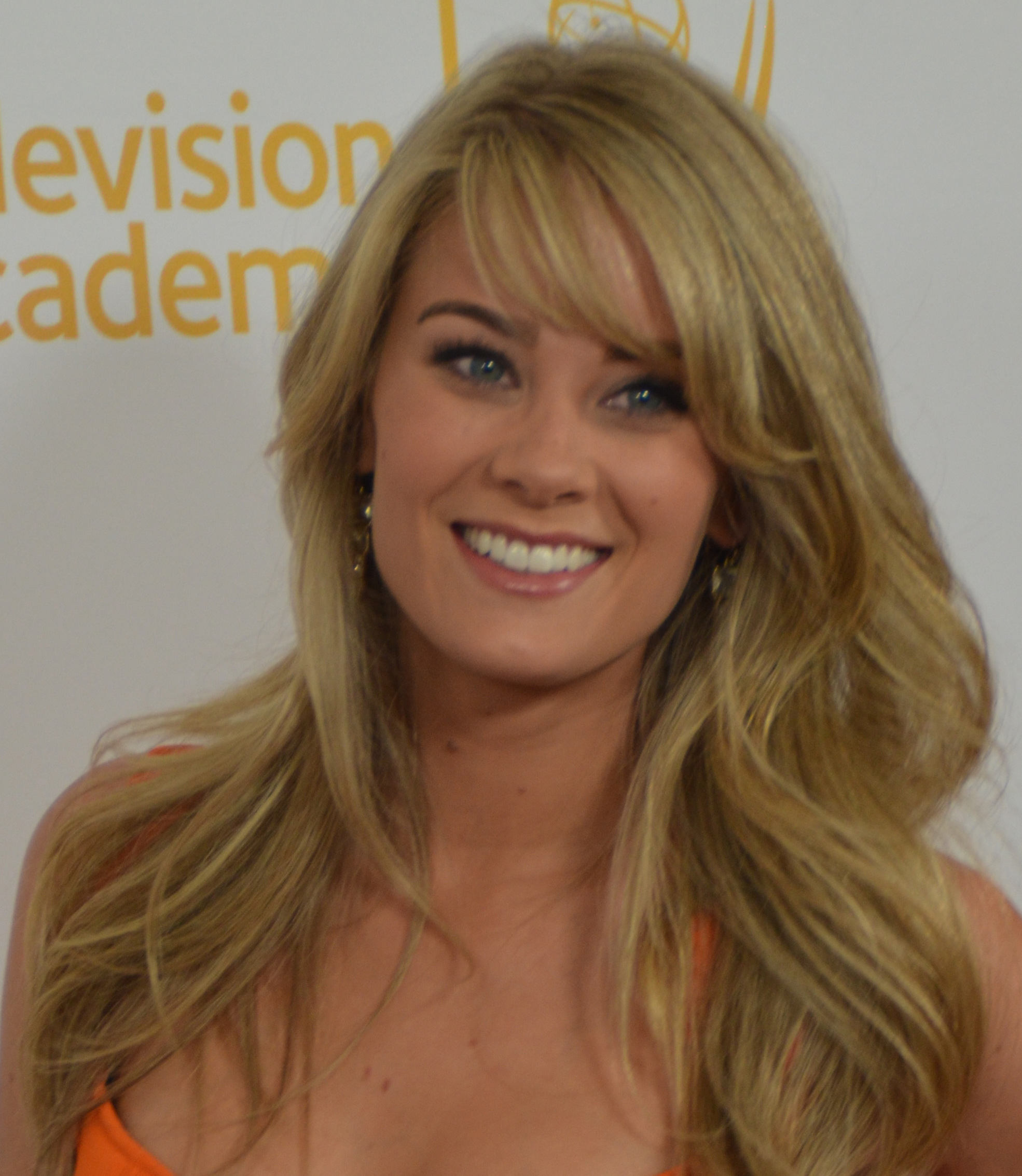
- Matula at the 2014 Daytime Emmy Nominees Reception
- Born: August 23, 1988 (age 38)
- Occupation: Actress
- Years active: 2006–present

Kim Matula (born August 23, 1988) is an American actress. She made her television debut playing Tara Conner in the teen comedy film Queen Sized (2008) and later starred as Hope Logan in the CBS daytime soap opera The Bold and the Beautiful from 2010 to 2016, receiving a Daytime Emmy Award for Outstanding Younger Actress in a Drama Series nomination. Matula later starred in the second season of Lifetime comedy-drama series, Unreal, and played the leading role in the Fox comedy series LA to Vegas (2018). In 2024, Matula played Jane Curtin in the comedy-drama film Saturday Night.

== Life and career ==
Matula studied film at the University of Texas at Arlington, but dropped out because her acting career was taking off. After starring in the small horror film Savage Spirit (2006), in 2008, Matula starred in the Lifetime teen comedy film Queen Sized opposite Nikki Blonsky and the following year appeared in an episode of CBS sitcom How I Met Your Mother. In 2010, she landed the role of Hope Logan in the CBS daytime soap opera The Bold and the Beautiful. In 2014, Matula was nominated for a Daytime Emmy Award for Outstanding Younger Actress in a Drama Series. In her two final years on the soap, Matula's character had major storylines. In November 2014, it was announced that Matula had not renewed her contract and would be departing the series for a career in primetime television and film.

In 2014, Matula starred opposite Scott Eastwood in the thriller film, Dawn Patrol. In 2016, she joined the cast of the second season of the critically acclaimed Lifetime dark comedy-drama series, Unreal. In 2018, Matula had a leading role as flight attendant Veronica "Ronnie" Messing in the Fox comedy series LA to Vegas. The series was canceled after one season. The following year she had a supporting role in the comedy-drama film, Fighting with My Family that premiered at the Sundance Film Festival. In 2021, Matula had a recurring role in the Fox series 9-1-1: Lone Star and played Laura Ingraham in the FX anthology series, Impeachment: American Crime Story. In 2022, she appeared in the HBO max series The Sex Lives of College Girls and played the leading role in the Hallmark fantasy film, Ghost of Christmas Always.

In 2024, Matula was cast as comedian Jane Curtin in the comedy-drama film Saturday Night directed by Jason Reitman about Saturday Night Live‘s opening night. In 2026 she was cast in the second season of Netflix thriller series, The Hunting Wives.

== Filmography ==
=== Film ===
Year	Title	Role	Notes
2006	Savage Spirit	Megan	
2010	Crown thy Good	Claire	Short film
2010	Spilt Milk	Sabrina	
2010	Cool Wheels	Stacy McFuggins	Short film
2013	Raptor Ranch	Josie Hutchens	
2014	Broken Strings	Wind / Heidi Lewis	Short film
2014	Dawn Patrol	Donna	
2015	Maybe Someday	Lacey	
2019	Fighting with My Family	Jeri-Lynn	
2022	Haunted	Mary	Short
2023	Tapawingo	Gretchen	
2024	Saturday Night	Jane Curtin	

=== Television ===
Year	Title	Role	Notes
2008	Queen Sized	Tara	Television film
2009	How I Met Your Mother	Girl	Episode: "Definitions"
2010–2016	The Bold and the Beautiful	Hope Logan	Series regular: January 11, 2010 – December 12, 2014; Guest: April 17 and 20, 2015 and March 16, 2016
2011	The Defenders	Mia	Episode: "Nevada v. Doug the Mule"
2014	Almost Royal	Herself	Episode: "Los Angeles"
2016	UnReal	Tiffany	Series regular, 10 episodes
2017	Rosewood	Leanne Forrest	Episode: "Fairy Tales & Frozen Truths"
2017	Teachers	Sharon	Episodes: "Dosey Don't" and "Lunchtime! The Musical"
2018	LA to Vegas	Veronica "Ronnie" Messing	Series regular, 15 episodes
2021	9-1-1: Lone Star	Lily	Episodes: "Back in the Saddle" and "2100°"
2021	Leverage: Redemption	Krista	Episode: "The Tower Job"
2021	Impeachment: American Crime Story	Laura Ingraham	Episode: "Not To Be Believed"
2022	The Sex Lives of College Girls	Michelle	Episodes: "Le Tuteur" and "Welcome to Essex"
2022	Adam & Eva	Monica	TV pilot
2022	The Resident	Scarlett Wexler	Episode: "Viral"
2022	Ghost of Christmas Always	Katherine	Television film
2023	True Lies	Lisa Hardy	Episode: "Honest Manipulations"
2023	Checkin' it Twice	Ashley Durreau	Television film
2024	NCIS	Agent Rose	Episode: "Algún Dia"
2024	The Finnish Line	Anya Kivelä	Television film
2026	The Way To You	Emma	Television film
2026	The Hunting Wives	Nadia Kelly	

== Awards and nominations ==
Year	Award	Category	Title	Result	Ref.
2014	Daytime Emmy Award	Outstanding Younger Actress in a Drama Series	The Bold and the Beautiful	Nominated	
2016	Soap Awards France	Couple of the Year — "Hope and Liam" (shared with Scott Clifton)	The Bold and the Beautiful	Nominated	
