= Gargantua (film) =

- VHS cover
- Directed by: Bradford May
- Written by: Ronald Parker
- Produced by: Peter V. Ware
- Starring: Adam Baldwin; Julie Carmen; Emile Hirsch
- Cinematography: John Stokes
- Edited by: Buford F. Hayes
- Music by: J. Peter Robinson
- Production company: Fox Television Studios
- Distributed by: Twentieth Century Fox
- Release date: May 19, 1998; (United States)
- Running time: 86 minutes
- Language: English
- Budget: $8 million

Gargantua is an American 1998 giant monster television film, starring Adam Baldwin, Julie Carmen and Emile Hirsch. It was directed by Bradford May and written by Ronald Parker. The film was shot on location throughout Gold Coast, Queensland, Australia.

== Plot ==
On the island of Malau, marine biologist Jack Ellway (Adam Baldwin) studies the effect of seismic activity on the area's marine life. A string of mysterious drownings soon turns their research project into a beachfront disaster as Jack learns that a nearby underwater trench is home to a family of giant amphibians that have mutated after prolonged exposure to buried pesticides. As Jack and local doctor Alyson Hart (Julie Carmen) explore the surrounding ocean for the creatures, the military arrives and begins to investigate. Jack's son, Brandon (Emile Hirsch), discovers and befriends a baby creature that is able to leave the ocean and walk on land. A more dangerous, bear sized creature responsible for incidents at the beach and implied to be the baby's older brother, also comes ashore and causes a panic before being captured.

Whilst held captive, the older brother and baby creature's cries cause the mother to rise from the deep to reclaim her children. After a plan to lure the mother back out to sea by releasing the younger creature goes astray, due to a greedy fisherman trying to abduct the juvenile for a huge payout to an exotic animal dealer, the mother begins searching the island for her offspring. Her destructive advance forces Colonel Wayne (Bobby Hosea), in charge of the local military, to get involved. Fearing for the safety of the islands and his men, the Colonel reluctantly gives the orders to attack and the mother creature is killed. Revealing the existence of the baby creature to his father, Brandon assists Jack in a new plan to ensure the creature's safety whilst the remorseful Colonel Wayne buys them time. An adult male, the mate of the slain female and father of the two juveniles, arrives to reclaim his offspring and deceased mate. The Ellways manage to free the two juveniles and all three remaining creatures depart back to the deep sea.

== Cast ==
- Adam Baldwin as Dr. Jack Ellway
- Julie Carmen as Dr. Alyson Hart
- Emile Hirsch as Brandon Ellway
- Bobby Hosea as Coronel Wayne
- Doug Penty as Paul Bateman
- Peter Adams as Dr. Ralph Hale
- Alexander Petersons as Derek Lawson
- Monroe Reimers as Presidente Manny Moki
- Darren Selby as Kikko
- Tony Briggs as Police Chief
- Don Battee as T J
- Clayton Watson as G.I. Wimberley

== In other media ==
Gargantua was novelized by K. Robert Andreassi, a pseudonym for Keith R.A. DeCandido, and published by Tor Books.

== Reception ==
Gargantua made its television premiere on the same night that one of its rival projects, Godzilla (1998), had its theatrical release. Gargantua holds a 21% rating on Rotten Tomatoes.

Julie Carmen was nominated for the ALMA Award in 1999 for her performance in this movie. She was indicated in the category "Outstanding Individual Performance in a Made-for-Television Movie or Mini-Series in a Crossover Role".
