= Condo (TV series) =

American sitcom television series

- Created by: Sheldon Bull
- Starring: McLean Stevenson; Luis Ávalos; Brooke Alderson; Mark Schubb; Marc Price; Yvonne Wilder; Julie Carmen; James Victor
- Theme music composer: George Aliceson Tipton
- Composer: George Aliceson Tipton
- Country of origin: United States
- No. of seasons: 1
- No. of episodes: 13

Production
- Executive producers: Paul Junger Witt; Tony Thomas; John Rich
- Running time: 24–25 minutes
- Production companies: Witt/Thomas Productions; Condo Productions

Original release
- Network: ABC
- Release: February 10 – June 9, 1983

Condo is an American sitcom television series that aired on ABC from February 10 to June 9, 1983. The series stars McLean Stevenson and Luis Ávalos as the fathers of two families who move into condominium units next to each other.

Sheldon Bull created the Condo series, which was executive produced by Paul Junger Witt, Tony Thomas, and John Rich. Saul Turteltaub and Bernie Orenstein were also producers.

This was the fourth sitcom to star McLean Stevenson since leaving M*A*S*H, all of them premiering while that series was still on (in fact, Condo premiered over two weeks before M*A*S*H's "Goodbye, Farewell and Amen" finale aired).

== Plot ==
James Kirkridge (Stevenson) was a middle-aged insurance salesman who was experiencing a gradual reversal in finances, so much that he and his wife Kiki (Brooke Alderson) had to put their rambling, palatial house in the suburbs up for sale, and downsize. Jesus "Jessie" Rodriguez (Avalos), a native of the Los Angeles barrio, had recently become successful as the owner of a landscaping business, enabling him and his wife Maria (Yvonne Wilder) to trade up to a more upscale neighborhood. Both couples ended up purchasing condominium units right outside a quaint Los Angeles-area fairway, and became each other's next-door neighbors. The white-bread Kirkridges at first mistook the Rodriguezes as the groundskeepers, but when Jessie informed them that he and his clan were in fact owners of the condo next door, wariness and bigotry ensued, mainly between staunch traditionalist James, a WASP, and the hot-headed, Roman Catholic Jessie, who had no patience for out-of-touch whites. Kiki, slightly daffy but strong enough to keep James from stepping out of line, was a little more accepting of her Hispanic neighbors, but found culture shock causing occasional friction between her and feisty Maria especially.

Before James and Kiki could accept that a Hispanic family could gentrify into a neighborhood such as theirs, both families would soon have to deal with another challenge. Shortly after the families moved in, the eldest Kirkridge child, college student Scott (Mark Schubb), and the Rodriguezes' daughter, law student Linda (Julie Carmen), became smitten with each other and started dating—unbeknownst to their families. In the series' second episode, the young couple had returned from a secret elopement in Las Vegas, and soon informed everyone that, in addition to having been married, that Linda was expecting Scott's child. This further added to the uproar on both sides, but the Kirkridges and Rodriguezes agreed that having the baby be born in wedlock was best; in episode three, the Rodriguezes held a proper wedding for Scott and Linda in their Catholic church. The families tried to resolve their differences for the sake of their children and incoming grandchild; with James and Jessie's constant clashing over ideals and social attitudes, however, it was going to be a long process.

Completing the families were preteen Billy Kirkridge (Marc Price), James and Kiki's youngest son, and Maria's father, Jose Montoya (James Victor), who lived in the Rodriguez household. The Rodriguezes also had a son, Miguel, who was enlisted in the Marines and was thus never seen. Grandfather Jose was bold enough to demolish a portion of the wall that separated both families' condo units, and everyone reluctantly agreed to his idea of putting a doorway in, so that all would have central access to the impending grandchild's nursery (in a valiant attempt to improve relations). James was especially displeased with the conversion, as he was quite content in keeping the room as his study. In episode four, Scott and Linda's baby boy, Joselito, was born, and his presence in the central nursery slowly brought the families closer together—but not without the steady stream of racial and religious jokes still flying around.

== Cast ==
- McLean Stevenson as James Kirkridge
- Brooke Alderson as Kiki Kirkridge
- Luis Ávalos as Jesus "Jessie" Rodriguez
- Mark Schubb as Scott Kirkridge
- Julie Carmen as Linda Rodriguez
- Marc Price as Billy Kirkridge
- James Victor as Jose Montoya
- Yvonne Wilder as Maria Rodriguez

== Theme music and presentation ==
The series' theme was "Live and Love it Up", a Latin-style arrangement combined with orchestral portions, arranged by George Aliceson Tipton. The opening lyrics were written by Paul Williams (who also wrote the lyrics for, and co-sang, the theme to another series from Witt/Thomas, It Takes Two, which aired on ABC that same season), with vocals performed by Drake Frye.

In a rare occurrence for a Witt/Thomas series, Condo also featured animation in its opening title. The first animated portion has two moving trucks driving from opposite directions over a map of Los Angeles, and after the trucks collide head-on within a clover-leaf rotary, the map dissolves into the series' title growing from the ground in giant block letters. A Southwestern-style roof appears over the title, and palm trees grow around it. The "N" in "CONDO" opens as if it were a door, and leads into the cast credit procession. The animation appears again at the end of the sequence, as the "N" closes over the last live-action clip (in which both families are posing on and around the Kirkridges' living room couch, similar to how the Tates and Campbells did in the title sequence of Witt/Thomas' Soap). The animation was designed by Donald R. Beck and Patrick Davidson.

Beck and Davidson also produced custom animation that was shown in early ABC promos for the series, in which two hillbilly-like characters are shown arguing over the dividing patio fence in a drawn exterior of the Kirkridge and Rodriguez condos. As ABC voiceover Ernie Anderson narrated, "Not since the Hatfields and the McCoys have there been neighbors like this!", the hillbilly representing Jessie Rodriguez then proceeds to blow up the hillbilly in James Kirkridge's place with dynamite.

== Casting ==
Yvonne Wilder was in reality two years older than James Victor, who was given heavy makeup and a graying beard in order to play Wilder's on-screen father. This sort of casting method was used on the later Witt/Thomas series The Golden Girls, in which Estelle Getty, who played Sophia Petrillo, was given makeup and hair that gave her a much older appearance. In real life, Getty was a year younger than Bea Arthur, who played her daughter, Dorothy Zbornak. In another connection between the two series, McLean Stevenson would later guest star on The Golden Girls as Dorothy's brother-in-law, Ted Zbornak.

About the time he was cast on this series, Marc Price had also been slated for the occasional role of Irwin "Skippy" Handelman on NBC's Family Ties, which had premiered five months before Condo. Price's status on Family Ties enabled him to take regular roles elsewhere. Condo was cancelled by ABC in May 1983, and Price immediately had Family Ties to fall back on. As a result, Price's role as Skippy on Ties was upgraded to that of full-time regular during the 1983–84 season. There was also another connection between these two series, as Brooke Alderson made guest appearances during the first season of Family Ties as Suzanne Davis, as friend of Elyse Keaton (Meredith Baxter-Birney). Alderson, whose second and last appearance on Ties aired shortly after the premiere of Condo, did not appear in the same episodes of Ties as Marc Price.

== Episodes ==
No.	Title	Directed by	Written by	Original release date
1	"The Neighbors"	John Rich	Sheldon Bull	February 10, 1983
James Kirkridge, a textbook WASP, and an upwardly mobile Hispanic, Jessie Rodriguez, find themselves as condominium neighbors faced with impending family ties.
2	"The Announcement"	John Rich	Sheldon Bull	February 17, 1983
Scott and Linda tell their parents that they have been secretly married and are expecting a baby.
3	"The Wedding"	John Rich	Sheldon Bull	February 24, 1983
The Kirkridge and Rodriguez families gather in a huge church for Linda and Scott's wedding.
4	"The Baby"	John Rich	Story by : Deborah Leschin; Teleplay by : Bob Fraser & Rob Dames	March 3, 1983
Under less-than-perfect circumstances, Linda decides it's time to rush to the hospital to have her baby.
5	"The Babysitters"	John Rich	Jeff Franklin	March 10, 1983
All four grandparents fight over the privilege of babysitting when Scott and Linda take a weekend vacation.
6	"The First Fight"	John Rich	Barbara Benedek	March 24, 1983
Scott and Linda have their first fight when they throw a party for his single friends.
7	"That's Entertainment"	John Rich	Alan Uger & Michael Kagan	March 31, 1983
James's quiet dinner with a conservative potential client is upset by Jessie's loud party with a mariachi band.
8	"The Franchise"	John Rich	Bob Fraser & Rob Dames	April 7, 1983
James and Jessie become partners in a hamburger franchise, but the partnership is far from smooth when the manager fails to show up on opening day.
9	"The Dog"	John Rich	Kathy Speer & Terry Grossman	April 21, 1983
Billy has a run-in with his father and Jose tries to take in a homeless old dog.
10	"Condomania"	John Rich	George Arthur Bloom	April 28, 1983
James and Jessie end up on a television court show when James insists that Jessie agreed to buy the Kirkridge condo.
11	"The Affair"	John Rich	Barbara Hall	May 26, 1983
The Kirkridges spot Maria having lunch with an attractive doctor and assume that he is having an affair.
12	"Nouveau Poor"	John Rich	Richard Baer	June 2, 1983
When James's insurance sales drop, Jessie offers to buy a policy but James's ego won't let him accept what he views as charity.
13	"Members Only"	John Rich	David Angell	June 9, 1983
Jessie's attempt to join the country club that James belongs to reveals the underlying bigotry of the other members.

== US television ratings ==
Season	Episodes	Start date	End date	Nielsen rank	Nielsen rating
1982–83	13	February 10, 1983	June 9, 1983	44	N/A
