= Jackson Pace =

American actor (born 1999)

- Born: February 19, 1999 (age 27); Boca Raton, Florida, U.S.
- Occupation: Actor
- Years active: 2006–present
- Known for: "Gage" in The Walking Dead
- Relatives: Hunter Pace (brother)

Jackson Pace (born February 19, 1999) is an American actor. He was a series regular in the Showtime television series Homeland, playing Chris Brody from 2011 to 2013. He also portrayed Gage in the AMC post-apocalyptic horror television series The Walking Dead (2018–2021), Luke in the Netflix series Grace and Frankie (2019), Glynn Lunney in the Disney+ historical drama The Right Stuff (2020), and Wyatt Harris in the Fox drama 9-1-1: Lone Star (2022–2025).

== Life and career ==
Pace was born in Boca Raton, Florida. At age three, he was featured in a commercial and was "hooked ever since". His first role was in 2006, on the television show Barney & Friends, playing Adam. He was featured in two episodes.

In 2007, he had a minor role in one episode on USA Network's Law & Order: Criminal Intent. In 2008, he appeared in the Lifetime television film Queen Sized, starring Nikki Blonsky. He played her younger brother.

In 2011, he was cast in the Showtime series Homeland as Chris Brody, the son of main character Nicholas Brody (Damian Lewis).

== Filmography ==
Year	Film	Role	Notes
2006	Barney & Friends	Adam	Episodes: "Mother Goose/Fairy Tales" and "Pets and Vets"
2007	Never Forever	Adam	Feature film
2007	The Gray Man	Billy Gaffney	Feature film
2007	Law & Order: Criminal Intent	Kid	Episode: "Depths"
2008	Queen Sized	Will Baker	TV film
2008	Everybody Hates Chris	Little Boy	Episode: "Everybody Hates Mother's Day"
2009	Ace in the Hole	Eddie Morella	Unsold TV series pilot with Adam Carolla
2010	Cool Dog	Jimmy Warner	Direct-to-video film
2010	A Walk in My Shoes	Mikey Kremer	TV film
2011	Criminal Behavior	Ben Collins	TV film
2011–2013	Homeland	Chris Brody	TV series, main cast member
2012	CSI: Crime Scene Investigation	Avery Keil	Episode: "Split Decisions"
2012	Criminal Minds	Billy Henderson	Episode: "Foundation"
2013	Jimmy	Max Cochran	TV film
2013	R.L. Stine's The Haunting Hour	Logan	Episode: "Toy Train"
2015	Code Black	Pete Irving	Episode: "The Son Rises"
2018	Instinct	Male Teen	Episode: "Live"
2018–2021	The Walking Dead	Gage	Recurring role, 9 episodes
2019	Grace and Frankie	Luke	Recurring role
2019	Just a Drill	Simon	Short film
2019	Emmett	Mac	
2020	The Right Stuff	Glynn Lunney	Main role
2021	High Holiday	Mitchell	
2022	Somewhere in Queens	Dani's Mall Date	
2022–2025	9-1-1: Lone Star	Wyatt Harris	Recurring role (season 3–4), main (season 5)
