= Julie Carmen =

American actress, dancer and psychotherapist

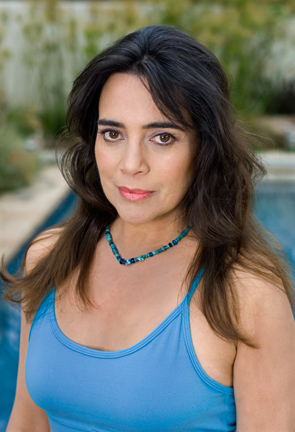
- Carmen in 2009
- Born: April 4, 1954 (age 72); New York City, U.S.
- Education: Empire State University (BSc); Antioch College; Neighborhood Playhouse School of the Theatre; HB Studio
- Occupations: Actress; dancer; psychotherapist
- Years active: 1976–present
- Known for: Gloria; Fright Night Part 2; The Milagro Beanfield War; In the Mouth of Madness; Condo; Gore Vidal's Billy the Kid
- Spouse: Gary Hoffman
- Children: 2

Julie Carmen is an American actress, dancer, and licensed psychotherapist. She came to prominence onscreen in the 1980s and 1990s, for her roles in John Cassavetes’ Gloria (1980), Robert Redford’s The Milagro Beanfield War (1988), and John Carpenter’s In the Mouth of Madness (1994).

She also starred in Fright Night Part 2 and Gore Vidal's Billy the Kid as well as a recurring role on the TV series Condo and Falcon Crest. She plays La Doña in Tales of the Walking Dead.

== Acting ==
Carmen was born in New York City of Afro-Cuban and Spanish/German American ancestry. Her father worked as a paper salesman and her mother was a language teacher.Her acting training was with Sanford Meisner at Neighborhood Playhouse School of the Theatre and with Uta Hagen and Alice Spivak at HB Studio. Carmen was on the Board of Directors of Women in Film for three years during which time she was the keynote speaker at the WIF Gala at the Beverly Wilshire Hotel, speaking about "The New Wave of Latinos and Latinas in Hollywood". Julie was on the Board of Directors of IFP/West for six years, during which time she created the John Cassavetes Award for emerging filmmakers who direct with the experiential style iconic of Cassavetes.

She has starred in a variety of films including Gloria directed by John Cassavetes, Night of the Juggler (1980), Comeback (1982) opposite Eric Burdon, Last Plane Out (1983), Condo, Blue City (1986), Robert Redford's The Milagro Beanfield War (1988), Fright Night Part 2 (1988) as vampire Regine Dandrige, Paint It Black (1989), John Carpenter's In the Mouth of Madness (1994), NYPD Blue (1999) and King of the Jungle (2000) opposite John Leguizamo. Julie starred in Dawn Patrol (2014), You Can't Say No opposite Peter Fonda, and Windows on the World opposite Edward James Olmos.

Carmen appeared on television most recently starring as La Doña on Tales of the Walking Dead and guest starring as Sarah in the 2022 Fall season of Grey's Anatomy. Julie played the female lead in the 1992 NBC mini-series Drugs Wars: The Cocaine Cartel, as well as playing the mother of Angelina Jolie's character in the 1997 Hallmark Entertainment miniseries True Women and the female lead opposite Val Kilmer in Gore Vidal's Billy the Kid directed by Billy Graham. Julie played female lead opposite George C. Scott in two made for television movies, Finding the Way Home and Curacao (also called Deadly Waters). She was a series regular, as Linda Rodriguez Kirkridge, on the short-lived ABC sitcom Condo (1983), and guest starred as Nina, the environmental revolutionary in three first-season (1990) episodes of the HBO original comedy series Dream On.

She danced on Broadway in Luis Valdez's Zoot Suit, and was resident choreographer at INTAR under the direction of Max Ferra. She studied dance at the Merce Cunningham and Erik Hawkins Studios, and Pilates at the original Joseph Pilates studio in NYC, which led to her 1979 teaching position at Ron Fletcher's Pilates Studio in Los Angeles. In 2007, she played the lead role Liz Estrada at the Getty Villa's commissioned update of Lysistrata.

As a producer, Julie Carmen is executive producer of the documentary feature film, Lico Jiménez the Ebony Liszt, directed by musicologist Isidro Betancourt about her great grandfather José Manuel Jiménez Berroa.

== Psychotherapist ==
In addition to her career in acting, she has subsequently pursued further study, becoming a licensed and practicing psychotherapist. She earned a B.S. in theater and choreography from the State University of New York Empire State, a master's degree in clinical psychology from Antioch College, and is a licensed marriage and family therapist. She is also certified through the International Association of Yoga Therapists and Yoga Alliance at the ERYT-500 level. Carmen is Director of Mental Health at Loyola Marymount University Yoga Therapy Rx and Director of Yoga Therapy for Behavioral Health supervised clinical practicum in co-operation with Venice Family Clinic. She published the article, "Informed Consent for Yoga Therapists" in Yoga Therapy Today through the International Association of Yoga Therapists.

Carmen was trained as a drama therapist by Ramon Gordon of Cell Block Theater. She designed and led the drama therapy and yoga therapy programs at Passages Drug and Alcohol Residential Treatment Center. She was a yoga therapist at Monte Nido Eating Disorder Centers and the Los Angeles School District's Program for Pregnant Teens.

She was referenced in actress Suzanne Somers' books, A New Way to Age and Ageless: The Naked Truth About Bioidentical Hormones in the chapters titled Julie Carmen Yoga.

== Filmography ==
=== Film ===
Year	Title	Role
1980	Night of the Juggler	Maria
1980	Gloria	Jeri Dawn
1982	Comeback	Tina
1982	The Man on the Wall	Viktoria
1983	Last Plane Out	Maria Cardena
1986	Blue City	Debbie Torres
1988	The Milagro Beanfield War	Nancy Mondragon
1988	The Penitent	Corina
1988	Lovers, Partners & Spies	Madonna
1988	Fright Night Part 2	Regine Dandridge
1989	Paint It Black	Gina Bayworth
1991	Kiss Me a Killer	Teresa
1991	Cold Heaven	Anna Corvin
1994	In the Mouth of Madness	Linda Styles
1996	África	Isabel
2000	King of the Jungle	Mona
2005	Angels with Angels	Graciella
2007	Illegal Tender	Nilsa
2009	Falling Awake	Angela
2009	The Butcher	Rose
2014	Last Weekend	Maria Castillo
2014	Dawn Patrol	Laura Rivera
2018	You Can't Say No	Matilda
2019	Windows on the World	Elena

=== Television ===
Year	Title	Role	Notes
1978	Guiding Light	Carmen Monvales	2 episodes
1979	Can You Hear the Laughter? The Story of Freddie Prinze	Rose	TV film
1980	Lou Grant	Teresa Davis	Episode: "Indians"
1981	300 Miles for Stephanie	Rosa Sanchez	TV film
1981	Nero Wolfe	Dr. Lydia Proctor	Episode: "What Happened to April"
1981	She's in the Army Now	Private Yvette Rios	TV film
1981	Fire on the Mountain	Cruza Peralta	TV film
1982	Cassie & Co.	Sheila	Episode: "The Golden Silence"
1982	Cagney & Lacey	Carmen	Episode: "Beyond the Golden Door"
1983	Condo	Linda Rodriguez	Main role
1983	Remington Steele	Gina Barber	Episode: "Steele Knuckles and Glass Jaws"
1984	The Fall Guy	Estrelita	Episode: "Rabbit's Feet"
1984	T. J. Hooker	Julie Mendez	Episode: "Gang War"
1984	Who's the Boss?	Teresa	Episode: "Angela's First Fight"
1984	Matt Houston	Fran	Episode: "Caged"
1984	Highway to Heaven	Elena Simms	Episode: "Hotel of Dreams"
1985	Airwolf	Teresa Guzman	Episode: "Prisoner of Yesterday"
1985	Fame	Diane Petit	Episode: "Who Am I, Really?"
1985	The Twilight Zone	Mary Ellen Bradshaw	Segment: "Wish Bank"
1985	Hotel	Teresa	Episode: "Celebrations"
1985–1986	Falcon Crest	Sofia Stavros	Recurring role (season 5)
1988	Beauty and the Beast	Luz Corrales	Episode: "Ozymandias"
1988	Police Story: Burnout	Kathy	TV film
1989	Gideon Oliver	Carlotta Guzman	Episode: "The Last Plane from Coramaya"
1989	Billy the Kid	Celsa	TV film
1989	Manhunt: Search for the Night Killer	Pearl Carrillo	TV film
1989	The Neon Empire	Miranda	TV film
1990	Dream On	Nina Ferrara	Episodes: "Three Coins in the Dryer", "Trojan War", "Up the River"
1991	Finding the Way Home	Elena	TV film
1992	Drug Wars: The Cocaine Cartel	Judge Sonia Perez-Vega	TV miniseries
1993	Curacao	Julia	TV film
1994	Seduced by Evil	Rayna	TV film
1995	Diagnosis: Murder	Moriah Thomas	Episode: "The Bela Lugosi Blues"
1995	ER	Mrs. Lafferty	Episode: "Motherhood"
1995	The Omen	Rita	TV film
1996	Top Gun: Fire at Will	Amanda Moore	Video game
1997	True Women	Cherokee Lawshe	TV film
1998	Gargantua	Dr. Alyson Shaw	TV film
1999	NYPD Blue	Nydia	Episode: "I'll Draw You a Map"
1999	Touched by an Angel	Elisa Morante	Episode: "The Letter"
2000	City of Angels	Vanessa Medina	Episode: "Weenis Between Us"
2000	The Expendables	Jackie	TV film
2016	NCIS	Mrs. Medina	Episode: "Home of the Brave"
2022	Tales of the Walking Dead	Alma	Episode: "La Doña"

== Awards and nominations ==
Year	Association	Category	Nominated work	Result
1991	Saturn Award	Saturn Award for Best Actress	Fright Night Part 2	Nominated
1998	ALMA Award	Outstanding Individual Performance in a Made-for-Television Movie or Miniseries in a Crossover Role	True Women	Nominated
1999	ALMA Award	Outstanding Individual Performance in a Made-for-Television Movie or Miniseries in a Cross Role	Gargantua	Nominated
2002	ALMA Award	Outstanding Supporting Actress in a Motion Picture	King of the Jungle	Nominated
2010	TheWIFTS Foundation International Visionary Awards	The Elizabeth Grant Entrepreneur Award		Won
2016	Imagen Award	Best Supporting Actress - Feature Film	Dawn Patrol	Nominated
