= You Can't Say No =

- Film poster
- Directed by: Paul Kramer
- Written by: Hus Miller
- Produced by: Hus Miller
- Starring: Marguerite Moreau; Hamish Linklater; Hus Miller; Julie Carmen; Peter Fonda
- Release date: March 3, 2018 (San Jose)
- Running time: 91 minutes
- Country: United States
- Language: English

You Can't Say No is a 2018 American comedy film directed by Paul Kramer and starring Marguerite Moreau, Hamish Linklater, Hus Miller (who also served as producer and screenwriter), Julie Carmen and Peter Fonda.

== Premise ==
Just days from signing divorce papers. Hank and Alexandra give their relationship one final shot by playing a game with only one rule. The rule being "No matter what they ask each other to do, they can't say no".

== Cast ==
- Marguerite Moreau as Alex
- Peter Fonda as Buck
- William Shockley as Will
- Hus Miller as Hank Murphy
- Hamish Linklater as Miles
- Julie Carmen as Matilda

== Production ==
Filming occurred in Sonoma County, California.

== Release ==
The film made its worldwide premiere at the Cinequest Film Festival at the California Theatre in San Jose, California on March 3, 2018.

== Reception ==
Bradley Gibson of Film Threat gave the film an 8 out of 10.
