= Collision Course: Truman vs. MacArthur =

- Genre: Historical Drama
- Screenplay by: Ernest Kinoy
- Directed by: Anthony Page
- Starring: Henry Fonda; Lucille Benson; E. G. Marshall; Lloyd Bochner; Russell Johnson; Howard Hesseman
- Country of origin: United States
- Original language: English

Production
- Executive producer: David L. Wolper
- Producer: Stan Margulies
- Production locations: NBC Studios - 3000 W. Alameda Avenue, Burbank, California
- Editor: Jim McElroy
- Running time: 101 minutes
- Production company: Wolper Productions

Original release
- Network: ABC
- Release: January 4, 1976

Collision Course: Truman vs. MacArthur is a 1976 American made-for-television historical drama film about the confrontation between President Harry S. Truman and General of the Army Douglas MacArthur during the Korean War.

== Premise ==
U.S. President Harry S. Truman (E.G. Marshall) and his commander in the Korean War, General Douglas MacArthur (Henry Fonda), disagree on war strategy. Their conflict comes to a head when Truman relieves the insubordinate MacArthur of his command.

== Cast ==
- Henry Fonda as General Douglas MacArthur
- E. G. Marshall as President Harry S. Truman
- Lucille Benson as Bess Truman
- Lloyd Bochner as Averell Harriman
- Russell Johnson as General George Stratemeyer
- Howard Hesseman as AP Man
