= Ayn Ruymen =

American actress

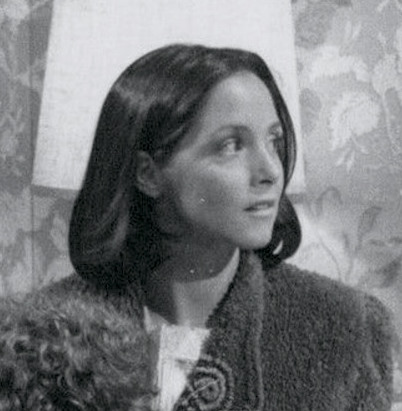
- Ruymen in 1977
- Born: July 18, 1947 (age 79); New York City, New York, U.S.
- Occupations: Actress; theatre director
- Years active: 1970–1993
- Known for: The McLean Stevenson Show; The Gingerbread Lady
- Spouse: Robert Ross (m. 2009)

Ayn Ruymen (born July 18, 1947) is an American former actress and theater director. She began her career as a stage actress, starring in a Broadway production of Neil Simon's The Gingerbread Lady (1970–1971), for which she won a Theatre World Award.

After relocating to Los Angeles, Ruymen made her feature film debut in Paul Bartel's horror film Private Parts (1972) and appeared in several television films during the 1970s. She had a lead role on the sitcom The McLean Stevenson Show from 1976 to 1977. She made her last screen appearance in the television film Firestorm: 72 Hours in Oakland (1993). Since then, Ruymen has worked primarily as a theater director of productions for the Mendocino Theatre Company.

== Early life ==
Ruymen was born July 18, 1947, in Brooklyn, New York City, one of six children, and was raised on Long Island. Her father, George Ruymen, worked as a building inspector for the City of New York. She began working as an actress while still a teenager, performing in theater productions in New Jersey. In 1969, Ruymen appeared as a model at the Miami International Boat Show to promote Sungard sunscreen, covering half her face in it before spending time in the sun, demonstrating the product's efficacy at preventing sunburns.

== Career ==
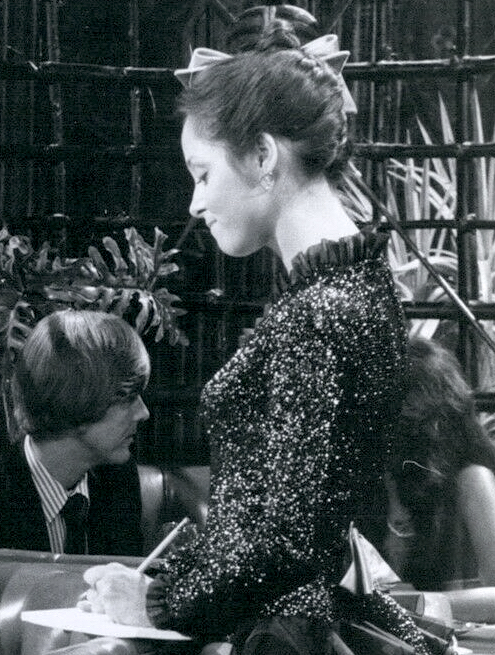
Ruymen in The McLean Stevenson Show, 1977

In 1970, she was cast as Polly Meara in a Broadway production of Neil Simon's The Gingerbread Lady opposite Maureen Stapleton, which ran between December 1970 and 1971. Critic George Oppenheimer praised Ruymen for "showing great promise" in the "difficult" role. For her performance, she won the Theatre World Award in 1971. During her stage career, she became a member of Actors' Equity.

Ruymen subsequently relocated to Los Angeles in late 1971 to pursue a film career. She commented that she initially disliked California: "I found the Sunset Strip disgusting. I was trying to get work and nothing happened for six months. It makes you want to pull your hair out." In early 1972, she was cast in an episode of the medical drama series Medical Center. She was subsequently cast in the lead role of Paul Bartel's horror film Private Parts (1972), playing a young woman who uncovers dark secrets in a Los Angeles hotel operated by her aunt. The following year, she appeared in the television film Go Ask Alice. She later had a minor uncredited role as a nurse in Steven Spielberg's Jaws (1975).

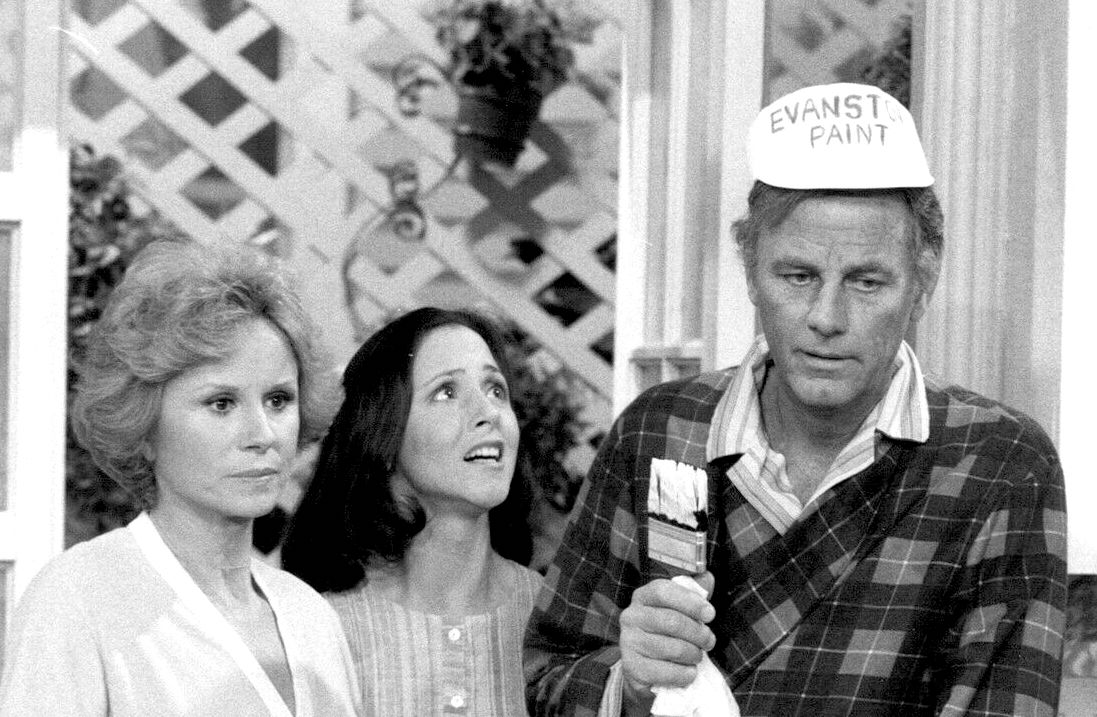
Barbara Stuart, Ruymen and McLean Stevenson in a publicity still for The McLean Stevenson Show 1977

Between 1976 and 1977, Ruymen had a lead role on the sitcom The McLean Stevenson Show, playing the daughter of a hardware store proprietor.

Ruymen's last film appearance was the 1993 television film Firestorm: 72 Hours in Oakland. In September 2009, she married Robert Ross, a visual artist and instructor at the Mendocino Arts Center and Oregon School of Arts & Crafts.

Ruymen has directed numerous plays for the Mendocino Theatre Company (MTC) as early as 1993, when she directed a production of Love Letters, which featured a nightly rotating cast.

In 1996, she directed 'A Perfect Ganesh' by Terrence McNally.

In August 2009, she directed an MTC stage production of W. Somerset Maugham's The Circle.

== Select filmography ==
=== Film ===
| Year | Title | Role | Notes | Ref. |
|---|---|---|---|---|
| 1972 | Private Parts | Cheryl Stratton | | |
| 1973 | Go Ask Alice | Jan | Television film | |
| 1974 | Tell Me Where It Hurts | Lynn | Television film | |
| 1974 | Hurricane | Suzanne | Television film | |
| 1975 | Jaws | Nurse | Uncredited | |
| 1976 | Three Times Daley | Jenny | Television film | |
| 1981 | Our Family Business | Annie | Television film | |
| 1993 | Firestorm: 72 Hours in Oakland | Mavis | Television film | |

=== Television ===
| Year | Title | Role | Notes | Ref. |
|---|---|---|---|---|
| 1972 | Medical Center | Denny | Episode: "Betrayed" | |
| 1972 | Bonanza | Evie Parker | Episode: "The Hidden Enemy" | |
| 1973 | Ghost Story aka Circle Of Fear | Young Gypsy Woman | Episode: "Death's Head" | |
| 1973 | The F.B.I. | Lorrie | Episode: "Night of the Long Knives" | |
| 1973 | Owen Marshall, Counselor at Law | Rita | Episode: "A Lesson in Loving" | |
| 1973 | The Streets of San Francisco | Liza Cullen | Episode: "Shield of Honor" | |
| 1973 | Ozzie's Girls | Roberta | Episode: "A Wedding To Remember" | |
| 1974 | Medical Center | Sharon Jennings | Episode: "No Escape" | |
| 1974 | Lucas Tanner | Kathy Farnsworth | Episode: "Look The Other Way" | |
| 1974 | The Texas Wheelers | Treva | Episode: "Big Night In The Blue Gum" | |
| 1975 | Baretta | Susie | Episode: "The Five and a Half Pound Junkie" | |
| 1975 | The Rookies | Sarah | Episode: "One-Way Street to Nowhere" | |
| 1975 | Petrocelli | Katie | Episode: "Terror On Wheels" | |
| 1975 | Police Story | Bobbie | Episode: "A Community Of Victims" | |
| 1975 | Cannon | Fabiana De Marco | Episode: "Tomorrow Ends At Noon" | |
| 1976 | Harry O | Virgiana McBain | Episode: "Hostage" | |
| 1976 | Visions | Liza Stedman | Episode: "Liza's Pioneer Diary" | |
| 1976–1977 | The McLean Stevenson Show | Janet Ferguson | Main role | |
| 1977 | Hawaii Five-O | Shirley Collins | Episode: "Tsunami" | |
| 1978 | Richie Brockelman, Private Eye | Ginny Kelly | Episode: "Escape From Cain Abel" | |
| 1978 | Quincy, M.E. | Carol Neilson | Episode: "Dead And Alive" | |
| 1990 | Midnight Caller | Mary Jessick | Episode: "Home to Roost" | |

== Stage credits ==
| Year | Title | Role | Notes | Ref. |
|---|---|---|---|---|
| 1970–1971 | The Gingerbread Lady | Polly Meare | Plymouth Theatre | |

== Awards and nominations ==
| Year | Award | Category | Production | Result |
|---|---|---|---|---|
| 1971 | Theatre World Award | | The Gingerbread Lady | Won |
