= Lucille Benson =

American actress (1914–1984)

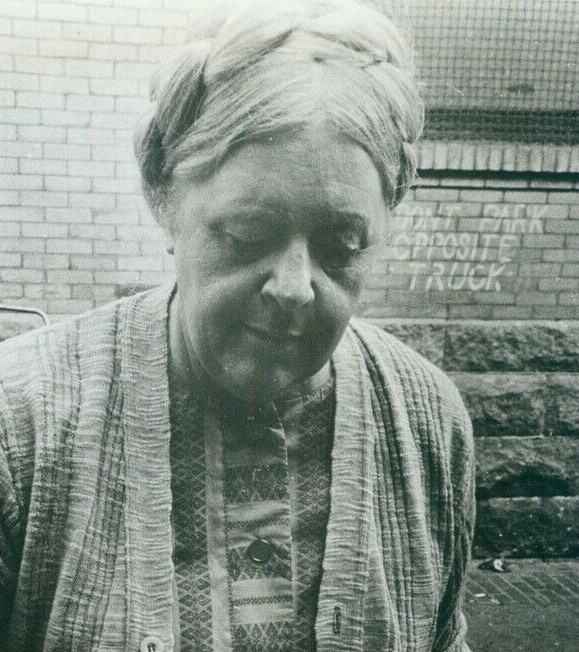
- Benson in Private Parts (1972)
- Born: July 17, 1914; Scottsboro, Alabama, U.S.
- Died: February 17, 1984 (aged 69); Scottsboro, Alabama, U.S.
- Resting place: Cedar Hill Cemetery
- Occupation: Actress
- Years active: 1930–1983

Lucille Benson (July 17, 1914 – February 17, 1984) was an American character actress.

== Biography ==
=== Personal life ===
Born in Scottsboro, Alabama, on July 17, 1914, Benson was adopted by her aunt, Mrs. John Benson, after her mother died of tuberculosis. She was valedictorian and president of her class at Jackson County High School. She attended Huntingdon College in Montgomery, and later attended Northwestern's School of Drama in Evanston, Illinois. After a short career as a teacher, she went to New York in the 1930s.

=== Acting career ===
Benson's career began in New York in the 1930s. She appeared on Broadway in several plays including Ladies Night in a Turkish Bath; Walking Happy; Hotel Paradiso; Good Night, Ladies; The Doughgirls; The Day Before Spring; Happy Birthday; As The Girls Go; and Period of Adjustment. She performed at the Coconut Grove Playhouse in Miami, appearing in the Tennessee Williams play Orpheus Descending.

Benson's break in motion pictures came while performing with Donald O'Connor in the play Little Me during a three-month run in Las Vegas. She said "While I was in Las Vegas, a former agent in Hollywood called to ask me to come to Hollywood to try out for a Paramount film. I went to Hollywood, tried out and was cast for the part in which I played opposite Robert Redford in Little Fauss and Big Halsy."

Benson played a lady running a roadside "Snakerama" exhibit in Steven Spielberg's 1971 movie Duel, starring Dennis Weaver. She worked with Spielberg again in 1979, in 1941, as a gas station owner whom John Belushi orders to refuel his fighter plane.

Benson even had the rare opportunity of enjoying a leading role in a feature film when she was cast as Aunt Martha, the nefarious proprietor of the sleazy King Edward Hotel in Paul Bartel's 1972 cult dark-comedy-horror-thriller Private Parts.

In Silver Streak (1976), Benson portrayed rancher Rita Babtree, who comes to Gene Wilder's rescue by ferrying him in her bi-plane to a small-town train station.

Benson portrayed Birdie Huff in the crime drama Nashville 99 (1977). She had a recurring role on the sitcom The Ropers as Helen's mother. Her big commercial break was Bosom Buddies, a situation comedy based on Some Like It Hot. During the show's first season (1980–1981), Benson played Lilly Sinclair, the manager of the female-only hotel where two young men (Tom Hanks and Peter Scolari) dress as women to take advantage of the inexpensive rent.

Benson played Mrs. Elrod in the 1981 John Carpenter horror movie Halloween II.

== Death ==
Benson died on February 17, 1984, in a hospital in Scottsboro, Alabama, aged 69, from liver cancer. She was cremated and her remains are buried under a modest bronze headstone, at Cedar Hill Cemetery, in her hometown of Scottsboro.

== Filmography ==
- The Fugitive Kind (1960) – Beulah Binnings
- WUSA (1970) – Second Matron
- Little Fauss and Big Halsy (1970) – 'Mom' Fauss
- Escape (1971) – Trudy
- Duel (1971) – Lady at Snakerama (Filling Station Owner)
- Cactus in the Snow (1971) – Mrs. Sawyer
- Women in Chains (1972) – Billie
- Delphi Bureau (1972) – Mrs. Loveless
- Slaughterhouse-Five (1972) – Billy's Mother
- Private Parts (1972) – Aunt Martha
- The Devil's Daughter (1972) – Janet Poole
- Tom Sawyer (1973) – Widow Douglas
- The Blue Knight (1973) – Elmira Gooch
- Mame (1974) – Mother Burnside
- Huckleberry Finn (1974) – Widow Douglas
- Reflections of Murder (1974) – Mrs. Turner
- Betrayal (1974) – Eunice Russell
- Collision Course (1976) – Bess Truman
- Silver Streak (1976) – Rita Babtree
- The Greatest (1977) – Mrs. Fairlie
- Black Market Baby (1977) – Mrs. Krieg
- Charleston (1979) – Miss Fay
- Ebony, Ivory and Jade (1979) – Mrs. Stone
- Concrete Cowboys (1979) – Peg, the Madam
- 1941 (1979) – Gas Mama (Eloise)
- Amy (1981) – Rose Metcalf
- Halloween II (1981) – Mrs. Elrod
- When Your Lover Leaves (1983) – Greta
- Moon Face (released after her death in 1984)

== Television appearances ==
- The New Andy Griffith Show (1971) – Mrs. Gaddis
- Cannon (1971) – Proprietress
- Bonanza (1972) – Mrs. Melody
- Mannix (1972-1974) – Myra / Ida
- Emergency! (1973-1976) – Annie / Martha
- The Day the Earth Moved (1974 TV movie) – Miss Virginia Porter
- Police Woman (1976) – Aunt Benjamin
- The Waltons (1976) – Tilly Shanks
- Petrocelli (1974-1976) – Lucille Davis / Madge Briar / Lucille Field / Angie Crawford
- Nashville 99 (1977) – Birdie Huff
- The New Adventures of Wonder Woman (1978) – Flo
- Eight Is Enough (1978)
- How the West Was Won (1978-1979) – Miss Agnes / Miss Walker
- Trapper John, M.D. (1979) – Clarissa Mae Purcell
- Little House on the Prairie (1979) – Miss Trimble
- The Ropers (1979-1980) – Mother
- The Dukes of Hazzard (1980) – Mama Coltrane
- Bosom Buddies (1980-1981) – Lilly Sinclair
- The Love Boat (1981) – Doris
- Simon & Simon (1982) – Mrs. Dorothy Bartlett
- The Wonderful World of Disney (1978-1982) – Mrs. Levelor / Grandma Hopkins
- Bring 'Em Back Alive (1982)
- Alice (1982-1983) – Grace / Lucille
