= The McLean Stevenson Show =

American television sitcom (1976–77)

- Genre: Sitcom
- Created by: Norman Barasch; Carroll Moore
- Directed by: Alan Myerson
- Starring: McLean Stevenson; Barbara Stuart
- Theme music composer: Paul Williams
- Country of origin: United States
- Original language: English
- No. of seasons: 1
- No. of episodes: 12 (2 unaired)

Production
- Executive producer: Monty Hall
- Producers: Arnold Margolin; Don Van Atta
- Running time: 30 minutes
- Production companies: McLean Stevenson Enterprises, Inc. Monty Hall Enterprises, Inc.

Original release
- Network: NBC
- Release: December 1, 1976 – March 23, 1977

The McLean Stevenson Show is an American sitcom that aired on NBC on Wednesday nights from December 1, 1976, to March 23, 1977.

== Premise ==
The series centered on Mac Ferguson, the owner of a hardware store in Evanston, Illinois (McLean Stevenson's birth state). Mac lived with his wife Peggy and two grown children, divorced daughter Janet, and son Chris. Also living in the household were Janet's two children, David and Jason, and Mac's mother-in-law.

== Cast ==
- McLean Stevenson as Mac Ferguson
- Barbara Stuart as Peggy Ferguson
- Madge West as Grandma Ferguson
- Ayn Ruymen as Janet Ferguson
- Andrew Parks as Chris Ferguson (eps 1–4)
- Steve Nevil as Chris Ferguson (eps 5–12)
- David Hollander as David
- Jason Whitney as Jason

== Background and production ==
McLean Stevenson left M*A*S*H in March 1975. He was signed to a one-year contract by NBC after doing so. A variety show he hosted in November of that year was not successful. Stevenson was approached in the spring of 1976 with an idea for a sitcom. Mac Ferguson, a hardware store owner, was framed as a nice guy, assailed on all sides, a man caught in the middle, and a chronic victim of circumstances – similar to the character he played as Lt. Col. Henry Blake in M*A*S*H.

The first seven episodes were taped, with the cast and production staff expecting the series to begin airing in January 1977. Then, some of the NBC program executives changed out, and it was insisted that one of the primary actors be replaced. Shortly after this, the premiere date was moved up from January to December 1.

As Stevenson explained, "They scrapped the first seven episodes and started from scratch...We've been working morning noon and night ever since. The minute we finish a show it's on the air. We're running as fast as we can. Nobody knows when or if we'll ever catch up."

The series was cancelled for the first time in mid-January 1977, and it was announced it would be replaced on February 9. As Barbara Stuart explained, while a swan song party was underway for the cast and crew, word came through that The McLean Stevenson Show had instead been spared. "You would have expected us to start jumping up and down with excitement, but we all just sat there – probably because we'd all been through so much, we just couldn't get emotional about it any more."

=== Theme music ===
The theme music was composed and performed by Paul Williams.

== Episodes ==
No.	Title	Directed by	Written by	Original release date
1	"Who Do You Trust?"	Alan Myerson	Story by : Mark Evanier & Dennis Palumbo; Teleplay by : Lloyd Garver	December 1, 1976
Mac arrives home after a day's work to find a burglar, whose pregnant wife is outside, robbing his house.
2	"Oldie But Goodie"	Unknown	Unknown	December 8, 1976
Mac discovers that his daughter is developing a relationship with an older man.
3	"Going My Way"	Bill Hobin	Bill Idelson	December 22, 1976
Chris meets a friend who wants to become a priest. Janet and her boys bring a Yorkshire Terrier home.
4	"Mac's Fatal Charm"	Unknown	Unknown	December 29, 1976
A friend of Janet's, divorced, makes a play for Mac.
5	"The Great Rift"	Unknown	Unknown	January 19, 1977
Mac refuses to attend group therapy sessions that Peggy wants him to attend to "add sparkle to their lives".
6	"Janet Leaves Home"	Unknown	Unknown	January 26, 1977
Janet leaves the Ferguson home, then entertains Mac and Peggy in her new living arrangements.
7	"Mac and Big Mac"	Unknown	Unknown	February 9, 1977
Mac's father visits, a visit which threatens to become a permanent living arrangement. He then tries to reorganize his son's hardware store.
8	"What Makes Mac Run?"	Unknown	Unknown	February 16, 1977
Mac considers running for city council. Two ladies from a city council screening committee come to interview him.
9	"Grandma's Secret"	Unknown	Unknown	February 23, 1977
Grandma Ferguson announces that she's engaged to be married. Mac is delighted, believing this means she'll soon move out.
10	"Money Troubles"	Unknown	Unknown	March 2, 1977
The family faces financial problems. Janet gets a job as a cocktail waitress.
11	"Strangers in the Night"	Unknown	Unknown	March 9, 1977
Mac and Peggy plan a private anniversary party at home, until two unexpected guests drop in.
12	"Say It Isn't So"	Unknown	Unknown	March 23, 1977
Peggy announces to the family that she may be pregnant.

Sources disagree on how many episodes were aired after the first ten; however, numerous contemporary newspaper sources suggest that the last two episodes of the series were aired on March 9, and March 23, respectively.

== Reception ==
It was hoped that Stevenson's popularity on M*A*S*H would draw viewers in, but the actor's first starring vehicle failed to find an audience and was cancelled after three months.
