= McLean Stevenson =

American actor (1927–1996)

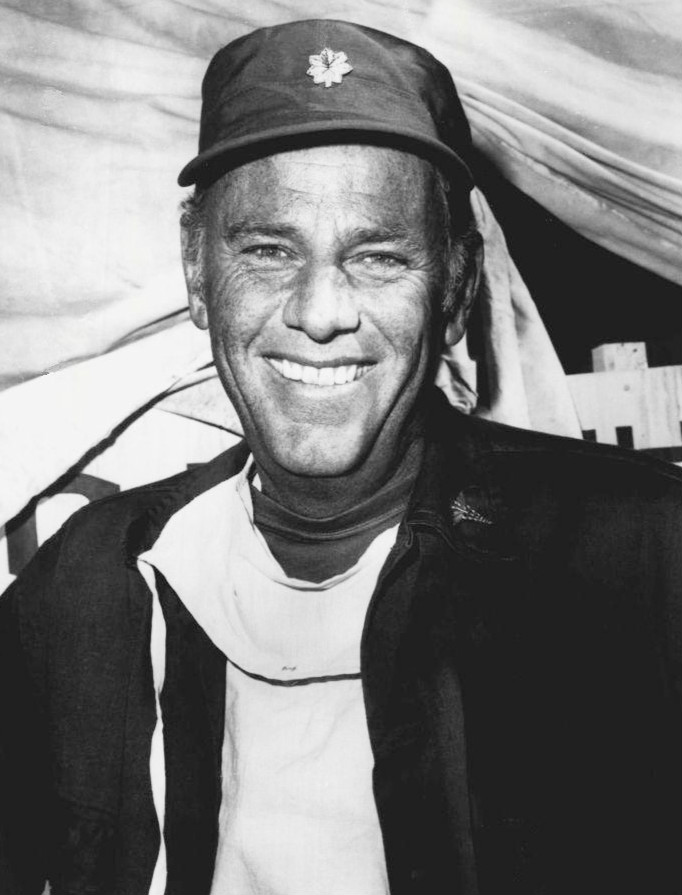
- Stevenson as Henry Blake on M*A*S*H (1972)
- Born: Edgar McLean Stevenson Jr. November 14, 1927; Normal, Illinois, U.S.
- Died: February 15, 1996 (aged 68); Los Angeles, California, U.S.
- Resting place: Forest Lawn Memorial Park, Hollywood Hills, California, U.S.
- Other name: Mac
- Education: Northwestern University (BA)
- Occupations: Actor, comedian
- Years active: 1962–1993
- Known for: M*A*S*H
- Spouses: Polly Ann Gordon (m. 1957; div. 1960) Louise Herbert (m. 1969; div. 1971) Ginny Fosdick (m. 1980)
- Children: 3
- Family: Stevenson

Edgar McLean Stevenson Jr. (November 14, 1927 – February 15, 1996) was an American actor and comedian. He is best known for his role as Lieutenant Colonel Henry Blake in the television series M*A*S*H, which earned him a Golden Globe Award in 1974. Stevenson also appeared on a number of television series, notably The Tonight Show Starring Johnny Carson, The Doris Day Show and Match Game.

== Early life and education ==
Stevenson was born in Normal, Illinois (coincidentally, a town located in McLean County). He was the great-grandson of William Stevenson (brother of US Vice President Adlai E. Stevenson), making him a second cousin once removed of two-time presidential nominee Adlai E. Stevenson II. He was also the brother of actress Ann Whitney. His father, Edgar, was a cardiologist. Their shared middle name, "McLean", came from Lottie McLean, Stevenson's paternal grandmother.

Stevenson attended Bloomington High School and Lake Forest Academy. After high school, he joined the United States Navy, and served from January 1946 to November 1947 as a hospital corpsman. After his service he attended Northwestern University, where he was a Phi Gamma Delta fraternity brother, and graduated with a bachelor's degree in theater arts.

== Career ==
Stevenson worked after college at a radio station, played a clown on a live TV show in Dallas, became an assistant athletic director at Northwestern, and sold medical supplies and insurance. He also worked as a press secretary for his cousin in the presidential elections of 1952 and 1956. He formed the "Young Democrats for Stevenson." In 1961, Stevenson's cousin invited him to social functions where he met a few business luminaries. He followed his cousin's advice to look for a show business career.

Stevenson auditioned and won a scholarship to the American Musical and Dramatic Academy. He made his professional career debut in The Music Man in 1962 and appeared regularly in Warsaw, Indiana, in summer stock productions. Before becoming a star, Stevenson appeared as a contestant on the Password television game show in New York City, winning five pieces of luggage. After this he appeared in New York City on stage, and in television commercials. He also performed on Broadway, and began to establish himself as a comedy writer, writing for the American version of That Was the Week That Was—in which Alan Alda appeared—and The Smothers Brothers Comedy Hour, performing occasionally on both shows. He was a regular on the 1970 The Tim Conway Comedy Hour variety show on CBS.

During the late '60s and early '70s, he appeared in TV commercials for products such as Kellogg's, Libby's fruit cocktail, Dolly Madison and Winston cigarettes, in which he was shown sprinting around a parking lot of Winston delivery trucks and painting over the product slogan, replacing the "like" in "like a cigarette should" with the grammatically correct "as".

=== M*A*S*H ===
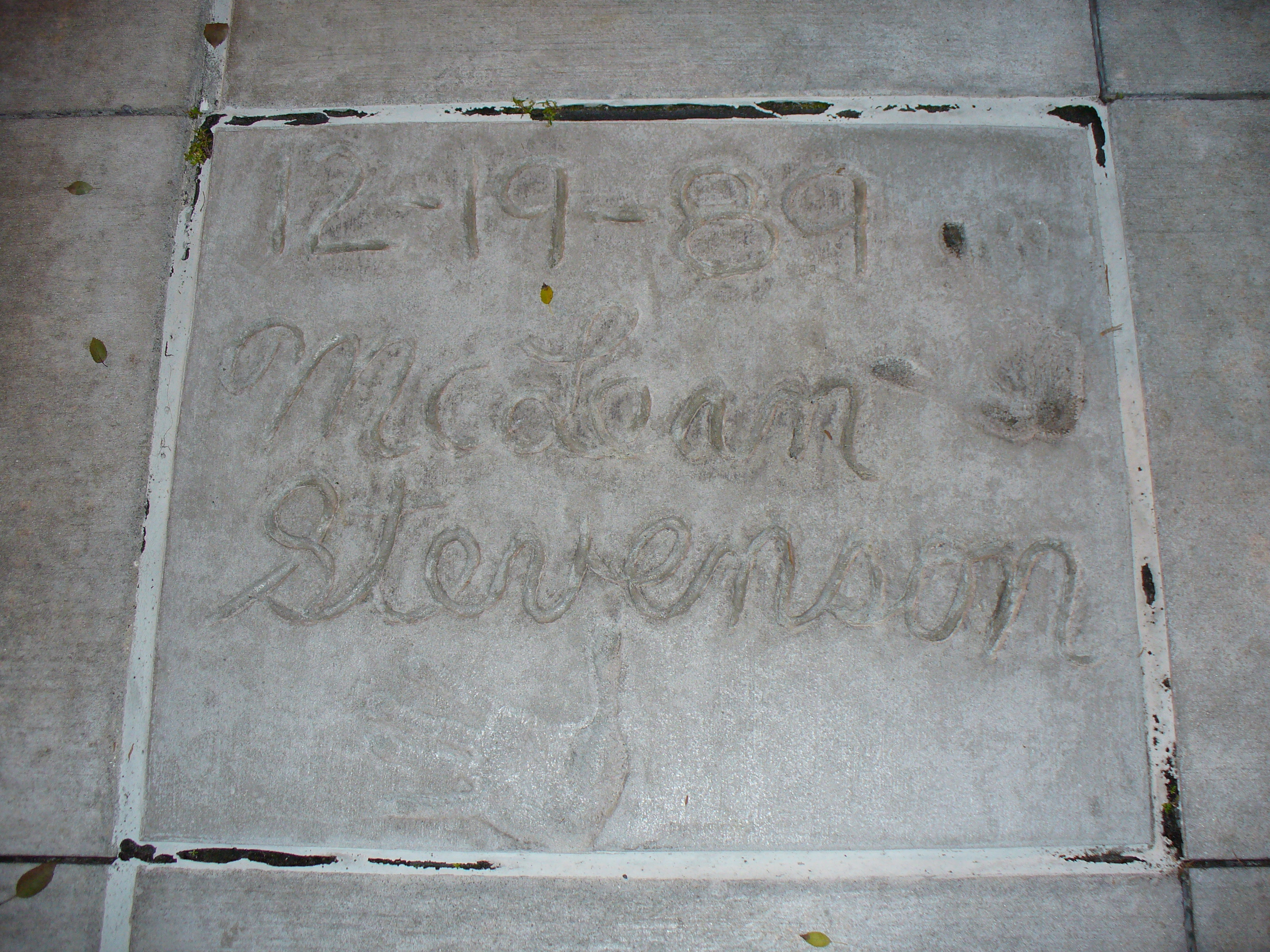
The handprints of Stevenson in front of Hollywood Hills Amphitheater at Walt Disney World's Disney's Hollywood Studios theme park

After guest-starring in That Girl with Marlo Thomas, he was cast in The Doris Day Show in 1969, playing magazine editor boss Michael Nicholson until 1971. Originally, he auditioned for the role of Hawkeye Pierce in M*A*S*H, but was persuaded to play Lt. Col. Henry Blake instead. Stevenson found his greatest success in M*A*S*H. The series quickly became one of the most popular situation comedies of its time, and was eventually recognized as one of the top sitcoms in television history. He wrote the episode "The Trial of Henry Blake", and provided the story for another, "The Army-Navy Game", which earned him an Emmy nomination.

Despite the show's success, Stevenson began to resent (as did Wayne Rogers) playing a supporting role to the wisecracking Hawkeye (played by Alan Alda), and asked to be released from his contract during the show's third season. The show's writers reluctantly penned him an exit in the final episode of the 1974–1975 season (entitled "Abyssinia, Henry"), in which Lt. Colonel Blake was discharged, only to board a plane that was shot down over the Sea of Japan, killing everyone on board—a development added after scripts were distributed so the show's actors would display genuine emotion.

In an interview, M*A*S*H actress Loretta Swit commented that Stevenson wanted to be the star and felt oppressed as one of an ensemble of eight. She said that before Stevenson left the series he told her, "I know I will not be in anything as good as this show, but I have to leave and be number one." Although he had played ensemble parts for several years, he stated that the primary reasons for his departure were systemic problems with 20th Century Fox, especially disregard for simple comforts for cast and crew on location, and the more lucrative opportunities presented to him at the time.

Stevenson was replaced in the series by Harry Morgan, a best friend of Stevenson who had guest-starred opposite him in the Season Three premiere episode "The General Flipped at Dawn".

=== Match Game ===
Stevenson appeared as a guest panelist for several weeks on Match Game in 1973 and 1974, and again in 1978 on the daytime and nighttime weekly syndicated version. In 1981, he became a regular panelist on the daily syndicated version of Match Game, staying with the show until its cancellation a year later. He would make occasional appearances on the subsequent Match Game-Hollywood Squares Hour in 1983 and 1984.

=== M*A*S*H aftermath ===
“I made the mistake of believing that people were enamored of McLean Stevenson when the person they were enamored of was Henry Blake. So if you go and do The McLean Stevenson Show, nobody cares about McLean Stevenson.”

— Stevenson in 1996, Los Angeles Times

After his departure from M*A*S*H, Stevenson's acting career declined. While occasionally filling in for Johnny Carson as guest host of The Tonight Show, Stevenson's first attempt at his own show was an NBC variety show special titled The McLean Stevenson Show on November 20, 1975. The program finished 41st in the ratings that week and the planned series was ultimately scuttled. He then starred in a series of sitcoms: The McLean Stevenson Show (1976–77), In the Beginning (1978), Hello, Larry (1979–80) and Condo (1983). All four sitcoms were dismissed by audiences, lambasted by critics and all aired while M*A*S*H was still in production. Only Hello Larry lasted two seasons; all the others were cancelled in their first.

Stevenson guest-starred as Stan Zbornak's brother Ted in the hit sitcom The Golden Girls in 1987, in addition to guest-starring in shows such as Square One TV, The Love Boat, Diff'rent Strokes (as part of a cross-over with his series Hello, Larry), and Hollywood Squares. He filled in for Johnny Carson as guest host of The Tonight Show 58 times, and as a guest on the program in 1982, he brought his daughter Lindsey onto the set when she was just 16 weeks old. During the 1988–89 television season, he returned to a supporting TV role in an ensemble, playing Max Kellerman in the short-lived CBS series adaptation of Dirty Dancing.

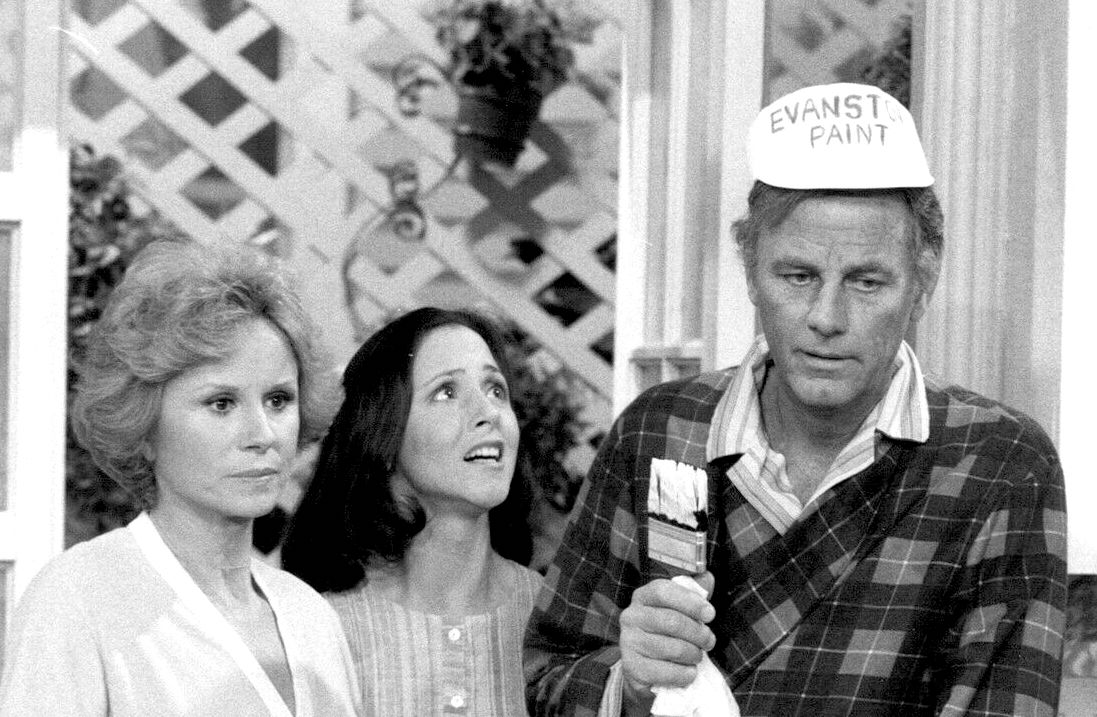
Barbara Stuart, Ayn Ruymen and Stevenson in a publicity still for The McLean Stevenson Show 1977

Stevenson's screen credits include the Disney movie The Cat from Outer Space as a friend of Frank Wilson (played by Ken Berry) along with his M*A*S*H replacement Harry Morgan. He also was a co-host of the syndicated daytime talk show America, which lasted 16 weeks between September 16, 1985, and January 3, 1986.

Stevenson's career decline saw him become a target for industry ridicule. Steve Daley wrote in 1985 that he had "worn out his television welcome", while David Bianculli drafted "The Annual McLean Stevenson Memorial 'I'm Gonna Quit This Show and Become a Big Star' Award" early in his career as a critic.

Stevenson considered leaving M*A*S*H the biggest mistake of his career. Stevenson admitted that his problem was finding something of the caliber of M*A*S*H, saying "I've never been able to work with a group that's as talented or scripts that are as good. I did some terrible shows. But nobody made me do it. I did everything by choice."

== Death ==
Stevenson was recovering from bladder cancer surgery at the Encino-Tarzana Regional Medical Center on February 15, 1996, when he suffered a sudden fatal heart attack. He was cremated and his ashes are interred in Forest Lawn – Hollywood Hills Cemetery in Los Angeles.

Roger Bowen, who portrayed Henry Blake in the 1970 movie M*A*S*H, died of a heart attack the day after Stevenson's death.

== Filmography ==
=== Film ===
| Year | Title | Role | Notes |
|---|---|---|---|
| 1971 | My Wives Jane | Dirk Bennett | TV movie |
| 1971 | The Christian Licorice Store | Smallwood | |
| 1971 | Mr. and Mrs. Bo Jo Jones | Minister | TV movie |
| 1972 | This Week in Nemtim | —N/a | TV movie |
| 1973 | Shirts/Skins | Doctor Benny Summer | TV movie |
| 1975 | Win, Place or Steal | Mr. Hammond | |
| 1978 | The Cat from Outer Space | Link | |
| 1982 | The Astronauts | Colonel Michael C. Booker | TV movie |

=== Television ===
| Year | Title | Role | Notes |
|---|---|---|---|
| 1969–1971 | The Doris Day Show | Michael Nicholson | 33 episodes |
| 1969 | That Girl | Mr. McKorkle | Episode: "My Sister's Keeper" |
| 1970 | The Tim Conway Comedy Hour | —N/a | Episode: "#1.9" |
| 1971 | Love, American Style | Lt. Miller | Episode: "Love and the Penal Code" |
| 1971 | The Bold Ones: The New Doctors | George Caldwell | Episode: "One Lonely Step" |
| 1972 | Insight | Mr. McAdams | Episode: "The System" |
| 1972–1975 | M*A*S*H | Lt. Colonel Henry Blake | 71 episodes |
| 1974 | The Flip Wilson Show | Himself | Episode: #4.17 - February 21, 1974 |
| 1973–1981 | Match Game | Himself | Game Show Participant / Celebrity Guest Star |
| 1975 | Cher | Lt. Colonel Henry Blake | Episode: "#8.22" |
| 1975 | The McLean Stevenson Show | —N/a | NBC variety show special, 1 episode |
| 1976–1977 | The McLean Stevenson Show | Mac Ferguson | 12 episodes |
| 1978 | In the Beginning | Father Daniel M. Cleary | 9 episodes |
| 1979–1980 | Hello, Larry | Larry Alder | 38 episodes |
| 1979 | Diff'rent Strokes | Larry Alder | 3 episodes |
| 1981 | The Love Boat | Bob Crawford | Episode: "A Model Marriage" |
| 1983 | The Love Boat | Captain Donahue | Episode: "The Captain's Replacement" |
| 1983 | Condo | James Kirkridge | 13 episodes |
| 1984 | Hotel | Harry Gilford | Episode: "Reflections" |
| 1984 | The Love Boat | Michael Borden | Episode: "The Buck Stops Here" |
| 1986 | Tall Tales & Legends | Andrew Jackson | Episode: "Davy Crockett" |
| 1987 | The Golden Girls | Theodore 'Ted' Zbornak | Episode: "Brotherly Love" |
| 1988 | Mathnet | Mike Pliers | Episode: "The Case of the Deceptive Data" |
| 1988 | Square One TV | Mike Pliers | 3 episodes |
| 1988–1989 | Dirty Dancing | Max Kellerman | 11 episodes |
| 1993 | Tales of the City | Booter Manigault | 2 episodes, (final appearance) |

== Awards and nominations ==
| Year | Award | Category | Nominated work | Result |
|---|---|---|---|---|
| 1973 | 25th Primetime Emmy Awards | Outstanding Performance by an Actor in a Supporting Role in a Comedy | M*A*S*H | Nominated |
| 1974 | 31st Golden Globe Awards | Best Supporting Actor – Television Series | M*A*S*H | Won |
| 1974 | 26th Primetime Emmy Awards | Best Supporting Actor in Comedy | M*A*S*H | Nominated |
| 1974 | 26th Primetime Emmy Awards | Best Writing in Comedy | M*A*S*H | Nominated |
| 1975 | 27th Primetime Emmy Awards | Outstanding Continuing Performance by a Supporting Actor in a Comedy Series | M*A*S*H | Nominated |
