= Starslayer =

American comic book series

- Cover to Starslayer #1 (Feb 1982), art by Mike Grell.

Publication information
- Publisher: Pacific Comics; First Comics
- Schedule: Monthly
- Format: Standard
- Publication date: February 1982 - November 1985
- No. of issues: 34
- Main character: Torin Mac Quillon

Creative team
- Created by: Mike Grell
- Written by: Mike Grell; John Ostrander
- Artist(s): Mike Grell; Timothy Truman
- Penciller: Lenin Delsol
- Inker: Mike Gustovich
- Colorist(s): Steve Oliff; Janice Cohen

Starslayer: The Log of the Jolly Roger was an American comic book series created by Mike Grell.

== Publication history ==
Grell originally created Starslayer for DC Comics, but plans to publish it were halted after the mass cancellation of titles known as the DC Implosion. Instead, he offered it to Pacific Comics, who released it as a six issue series in 1982. It was originally intended as an ongoing series per Pacific Comics's publisher Bill Schanes; however, Grell's developing relationship with the new First Comics and previous working relationship with their editorial director Mike Gold (who had been Grell's editor at DC) swayed him to release future issues with First. In August 1983, First Comics continued the series, starting with issue #7, with Grell writing and providing breakdown art with finishes by Lenin Delsol. Grell left the series after issue #8, and was replaced by writer John Ostrander and Delsol as sole artist. Later contributors to the series were Timothy Truman, Hilary Barta, and Tom Sutton. The final issue, #34, came out November 1985.

Grell has stated that the character was created as the inverse of his DC Comics character Warlord.

Issues 2 and 3 saw the introduction of Dave Stevens' Rocketeer as a back-up feature. In issue #10, the character Grimjack was introduced in the same fashion; he would later receive his own title. Another character that appeared as backup feature was Groo the Wanderer, who also later received his own title at Pacific.

In 1995, Grell released an expanded version of the original limited series through Acclaim Comics. The expanded version, titled Starslayer: The Director's Cut, ran for eight issues.

== Description ==
The first six issue limited series introduces the main character Torin Mac Quillon, a Celtic warrior from the time of the Roman Empire. Just before he is killed while fighting a group of Roman soldiers, he is pulled into the distant future by Tamara, a descendant of his wife after she remarried. Torin is asked to join the crew of the spaceship Jolly Roger in their fight against the oppressive regime that is ruling the Earth. Torin agrees, and he and his new shipmates successfully save the Earth's dying sun by the end of the first series.

When First Comics restarted the series, Torin and his crewmates travel throughout the galaxy and end up in Cynosure, the nexus of all realities for First Comics, and gain a crew of pirates. At some point Torin travels back to the Solar System with a device that can cause a star to implode into a black hole. He uses this weapon on the Sun in the course of battle to destroy his enemies. Just at the point of implosion Torin speaks the name of the Celtic goddess of death, Morrigan, effectively sacrificing the star to her, which brings her back into existence. She proclaims Torin to be her avatar and orders him to go into the galaxy and kill in her name. Torin rebels, which is the basis of the remainder of the title's run.
