= The Kents =

1997–98 comic book limited series

Publication information
- Publisher: DC Comics
- Schedule: Monthly
- Format: Limited series
- Genre: Western
- Publication date: August 1997 - July 1998
- No. of issues: 12
- Main character(s): Nathaniel Kent; Jebediah Kent

Creative team
- Written by: John Ostrander
- Artist: Tom Mandrake
- Penciller: Timothy Truman
- Inker: Michael Bair
- Letterer: Bill Oakley
- Colorist(s): Digital Chameleon; Carla Feeny
- Editor: Peter Tomasi

Collected editions
- The Kents: ISBN 1-56389-513-7

The Kents is the title of a 12-issue comic book limited series published by DC Comics, from August 1997 to July 1998. The story concerns a troubled generation of ancestors to Jonathan "Pa" Kent (Superman's adoptive father). Set in the mid to late 19th century, the two main characters are brothers Nathaniel and Jebediah. The series was written by John Ostrander. As with many limited series, it was later collected as a trade paperback.

== Publication history ==
The series was written by John Ostrander with pencils/inks for the first eight issues by Timothy Truman/Michael Bair. In issue #9 Tom Mandrake took over full art duties for the final four issues.

== Plot ==
The story begins with Clark Kent's adoptive father Jonathan writing to his adopted son (Superman) about the memoirs he has discovered on the family farm. They reveal that the Kent family in the 19th century were noted abolitionists who assisted the personnel of the Underground Railroad, like Harriet Tubman. The family moved to Kansas Territory during its infamous violent conflict over its status concerning slavery, Bleeding Kansas, to promote the cause of creating a free state by running a newspaper for the region.

However, the family patriarch was murdered by border ruffians who wanted to silence him. Furthermore, the sons, Nathaniel and Jeb, argued and had a parting of the ways so deep about slavery that they found themselves on opposing sides of the American Civil War, with Jeb fighting with the notorious Confederate guerrilla unit led by William Quantrill and Nathaniel fighting for the North and marrying a half-Native American woman who gave him a special traditional spiritual symbol that was apparently a forerunner and inspiration for Superman's chest symbol.

After the war, Nathaniel became a sheriff in Smallville, while Jeb became the leader of a group of bandits. Eventually, Jeb discovered he had a son out of wedlock years ago, and allowed him to join his gang, but his son turned out to be a murderous sociopath and Jeb approached his estranged brother to arrange a trap to stop his son.

In springing the trap, the son mortally wounded his father before being killed himself and Jeb has just enough time to fully reconcile with Nate before dying. Nate remained in Smallville and there the Kents have since stayed for generations, including Jonathan and Martha Kent, Superman's adoptive parents.

== In other works ==
John Ostrander includes a subtle reference to The Kents in the 2002 Marvel/MAX limited series Apache Skies. Set in 1886, the first issue of Apache Skies depicts Johnny Bart—the Rawhide Kid—arriving by train in the town of Sagoro, Texas, seeking to avenge the death of the Apache Kid. When approached by the local sheriff, Bart uses the alias "Jeb Kent".

== Collected editions ==
The series has been collected into one trade paperback:

- The Kents (272 pages, 2000, ISBN 1-56389-513-7)
