= Kim Yale =

American comic book writer and editor

- Born: November 22, 1953 Evanston, Illinois, U.S.
- Died: March 7, 1997 (aged 43)
- Areas: Writer, Editor
- Notable works: Grimjack; Suicide Squad; Manhunter
- Spouse: John Ostrander

Kim Yale (November 22, 1953 – March 7, 1997) was an American writer and editor of comic books for several publishers including DC Comics, Eclipse Comics, First Comics, Marvel Comics, and WaRP Graphics.

== Biography ==
Yale was born in Evanston, Illinois, to the Reverend Richard A. Yale, son of Charles Oliver Yale, and Theresa Yale. Her grandfather Charles was a construction business owner, building churches, post offices, and bridges, a Freemason of Philadelphia, and a member of the Episcopal Church of St. Luke. Her father was a Navy chaplain and Lieutenant Commander, which meant that for many years she and her family moved to various locations in the United States and elsewhere before resettling in Evanston during her teen years. She earned a B.A. in English from Knox College.

Yale's first published comics work appeared in 1987 in the New America limited series, a spin-off of Timothy Truman's Scout series published by Eclipse Comics. She married fellow comics creator, and frequent collaborator, John Ostrander the same year. Yale and Ostrander developed the character of Barbara Gordon into Oracle, and wrote her origin in the short story "Oracle: Year One" published in The Batman Chronicles #5 (Summer 1996). Her husband, John Ostrander, also worked on various comics such as Star Wars, Batman, Suicide Squad, Wonder Woman, Punisher, and X-Men.

The two co-wrote Manhunter, a series which DC launched in the wake of the Millennium crossover. Their collaboration on Suicide Squad included the "Janus Directive" storyline in issues #27–30 and the creation of the character Dybbuk in issue #45 (Sept. 1990). Yale served as an editor for DC from 1991–1993 and oversaw licensed titles such as Advanced Dungeons and Dragons, Dragonlance, Forgotten Realms, Star Trek, and Star Trek: The Next Generation.

=== Friends of Lulu ===
Yale was heavily involved with the Friends of Lulu, an organization promoting women in comics that operated from 1994 to 2011. Yale served as a member of the board and Vice President of the New York chapter. The Kimberly Yale Award for Best New Talent, an award given by the Friends of Lulu organization, was named in her honor.

=== Cancer ===
Yale wrote an ongoing column in the Comics Buyer's Guide, in which she detailed her battle against breast cancer. Following her diagnosis, the cancer spread to her abdomen and pelvis, a process she described in detail to the readers of the column. The cancer made it very difficult for her to write, and the origin story for Oracle included in The Batman Chronicles #5 (1996) was her last project. Yale died of breast cancer in 1997 at the age of 43.

== Bibliography ==
=== As writer ===
==== DC Comics ====
- The Batman Chronicles #5 (1996)
- Comet #11 (1992)
- Deadshot #1–4 (1988–1989)
- Manhunter #1–24 (1988–1990)
- Suicide Squad #23–24, 27–32, 34, 36–37, 39–43, 45–66 (1989–1992)

==== Eclipse Comics ====
- New America #1–4 (1987–1988)
- Real War Stories #2 (1991)

==== First Comics ====
- The Gift: A First Publishing Holiday Special #1 (1990)
- Grimjack #44–45, 48, 53, 58–59, 61, 64, 66, 70–81 ("Munden's Bar" backup stories) (1988–1991)
- Munden's Bar Annual #2 (1991)

==== Marvel Comics ====
- Double Edge: Omega #1 (1995)
- Excalibur Annual #2 (1994)

==== WaRP Graphics ====
- ElfQuest: Kahvi #1–6 (1995–1996)
- ElfQuest: New Blood #9 (1993)

=== As editor ===
==== DC Comics ====
- Advanced Dungeons & Dragons #26–36 (1991)
- Avatar #2–3 (1991)
- Dragonlance #26–28, 33–34 (1991)
- Forgotten Realms #17–25 (1991)
- The Outlaws #1–8 (1991)
- Peter Cannon, Thunderbolt #6 (1992)
- Sgt. Rock vol. 2 #14–21 (1991–1992)
- Sgt. Rock Special #12–13 (1991)
- Star Trek #32–39, 41, 45 (1992–1993)
- Star Trek: The Next Generation #32–39, Annual #3 (1992)
- Zatanna #1–4 (1993)
