= Wasteland (DC Comics) =

Comic book series published by DC Comics

- Cover of Wasteland #1 (DC Comics, Dec. 1987), artwork by George Freeman.

Publication information
- Publisher: DC Comics
- Schedule: monthly
- Publication date: December 1987 – May 1989
- No. of issues: 18

Creative team
- Written by: John Ostrander, Del Close
- Artist(s): Don Simpson, David Lloyd, William Messner-Loebs, Timothy Truman, George Freeman
- Colorist(s): Lovern Kindzierski
- Editor(s): Mike Gold

Collected editions
- Wasteland Vol. 1: ISBN 978-1401270902

Wasteland was an American anthology-style horror comic book published by DC Comics in 1987–1989 and intended for adult readers. Written by John Ostrander and comedian Del Close, the series lasted 18 issues. It served as inspiration for the 2020 comedy-documentary For Madmen Only: The Stories of Del Close.

== Publication history ==
Ostrander and Close had previously worked together on a selection of "Munden's Bar" backup stories in Ostrander's Grimjack title, published by First Comics. Editor Mike Gold, coming to DC from First, suggested that Ostrander and Close work together again in creating Wasteland.

Each issue (with the exception of the book-length final issue) consisted of three unrelated stories written by Ostrander and/or Close. For the most part each issue featured a team of four artists, one of whom would illustrate each of the three stories, the fourth supplying that month's cover (which would bear no, or at most only a thematic, connection to the interior contents). Initially, these duties rotated among Don Simpson, David Lloyd, William Messner-Loebs, and George Freeman; by issue 13 Freeman, Lloyd and Loebs had all left the series (though Loebs returned for the last two issues). Later issues featured Bill Wray as a regular and guest artists like Timothy Truman, Joe Orlando and Ty Templeton.

In a famous mix-up, issue #5 was originally released with the cover meant for issue #6. Besides bearing the wrong issue number, this meant that Freeman, credited on the cover, didn't actually appear in the initial release of that issue, and also made nonsense of the issue's letter column. Issue #5 was reprinted the following week with the correct cover (by Freeman) and the next month, issue #6 came out with a blank white cover, "The Real No. 6" where the issue number would normally appear, and a text piece on the inside cover explaining what had happened. Thanks to the blank cover, this was the only issue in which Don Simpson's artwork did not appear, though the cover did carry the usual credit for him.

== Overview ==
For the most part, the series avoided the sort of gory shock associated with twist ending horror comics, typified by Tales from the Crypt and The Twilight Zone television series, in favor of more unpredictable and ambivalent stories. The themes of alienation and psychological dread often occurred, mixed with grotesque black humor, absurdism and social and political commentary in the form of satire. A text page in the first issue mentioned a desire to improve upon what the creators felt didn't work in DC's own House of Mystery, which had twice folded at the time.

The stories did not take place in the DC Universe. No established DC characters appeared, and in one story, "Paper Hero", Captain Marvel was clearly a fictional comic-book character. The only exceptions came in a story entitled "Big Crossover Issue" in which a few DC characters (and another of Ostrander's creations, Grimjack) appeared in a metafictional context, and in the series' final issue, in which the entire run of the series (including "Crossover") was "rewound" to the beginning of the very first story.

Indeed, some stories were clearly meant to take place in the real world. One portrayed the death of H. P. Lovecraft. Another, "American Squalor", pastiched the autobiographical comics series American Splendor by Harvey Pekar, with Don Simpson imitating the drawing style of Robert Crumb. This story portrayed a thinly guised version of Pekar in one of his acrimonious appearances on Late Night with David Letterman, in which Pekar had denounced General Electric. The narrative was also influenced by a 1961 monologue by Close's comedian colleague Severn Darden. Typically, "American Squalor" both included political content in the story and also turned it into a fable about self-loathing and anxiety.

One story in almost every issue of Wasteland was an exaggerated vignette taken from the colorful life of Wasteland co-writer Del Close. In one of these stories, "Del & Elron", Close is voluntarily hypnotized by L. Ron Hubbard and is present when Hubbard comes up with the notion of turning Hubbard's Dianetics into the "religion" of Scientology. In his stories, Close also openly discussed such other controversial topics as his own drug use and his involvement with witchcraft as a religion.

Wasteland was characterized by lively debates which took place within its letter columns.
