= Scout (comics) =

American comic book series

- The cover to Scout #23, with art by Timothy Truman

Publication information
- Publisher: Eclipse Comics
- Schedule: Bimonthly; Monthly
- Format: Ongoing series
- Publication date: September 1985 – December 1989
- No. of issues: Scout: 24; Swords of Texas: 4 New America: 4 Scout Handbook: 1 Scout: War Shaman: 16
- Main character: Emanuel Santana

Creative team
- Created by: Timothy Truman
- Written by: Timothy Truman
- Artist(s): Timothy Truman; Thomas Yeates; Flint Henry
- Penciller: Rick Veitch
- Inker: Stephen R. Bissette
- Letterer: Timothy Harkins
- Colorist(s): Sam Parsons; Steve Oliff
- Editor: Cat Yronwoode

Scout is an American dystopian comic book series created and written by Timothy Truman, and first published by Eclipse Comics in 1985. The story stars a Native American Apache named Emanuel Santana. The setting of the series is a future United States which has become a Third World country.

In 2018 Truman launched a successful Kickstarter campaign, Scout Marauder, to expand on the storyline of his beloved character Scout. The promotion was a success, raising over $44,000.00 from supporters. The campaign was projected to be completed in February 2019. As of July 2024, the project is still in production. The Scout Marauder graphic novel is available on his website as a pre-order.

As of August 2026, the project is now over seven years late.

== Creation ==
Timothy Truman first met Eclipse publisher Dean Mullaney and editor-in-chief Cat Yronwode through mutual acquaintance Tom Yeates. At the time Truman's association with First Comics was winding down as he was beginning to tire of late payments, and after a positive experience publishing the one-shot Killer Tales by Tim Truman (compiled from material created for Pacific Comics) he was impressed by their standards of creator ownership and struck a deal with them to publish new creation Scout.

A student of Native American history, Truman based Santana's origin on 1890s reeducation camps, particularly Camp Falwell in Carlisle, Pennsylvania, and also drew inspiration from Forrest Carter's Cry, Geronimo!, a fictionalized biography of Geronimo, and Apache mythical beliefs. He cited the influence of European artists including Paolo Serpieri, Hugo Pratt, Juan Zanotto and Jordi Bernet on his style for Scout's visuals. Truman's love of music also shaped the story; the characters Rosana 'Rosa' Winter and Raymond Vaughn were named for two of Truman's favourite blues guitarists - Johnny Winter and Stevie Ray Vaughan, while issue titles referenced some of his favourite songs, including "Evil" by Howlin' Wolf, "Little Red Rooster" and "I Ain't Superstitious" by Willie Dixon and "Machine Gun" by Jimi Hendrix. Truman intentionally made it ambiguous as to whether Santana was truly communicating with Apache spirits or just under the influence of drugs administered by his former employers.

== Publication history ==
=== Scout ===
Twenty-four issues of the first series were published, initially with John K. Snyder III's Fashion in Action as a back-up strip. The series started off as a bimonthly title before becoming a monthly from the fourth issue onwards. The series was initially planned as a six-issue limited series but positive response saw it instead become an ongoing. Truman would then loosely plot the series in lengthy arcs of around 12 issues a time. He largely wrote and drew the series himself; however Scout #7 saw Yeates fill in on art duties. In place of a backup feature, Scout #10 featured a gallery of pinups of characters from the series by the 'XQBs' (ex-Kubies, a nickname for Truman's fellow Joe Kubert School of Illustration alumni). From #11 the backup became Truman's own Monday, the Eliminator with art by Flint Henry; the story was set in the Scout universe. When Eclipse attempted to create a shared universe for some of its titles, Truman and Eclipse decided Scout's alternate future setting made it unsuitable; the characters were also absent from cross-property series Total Eclipse for the same reason. However, Scout #17 did feature a brief unlikely crossover with Larry Marder's Tales of the Beanworld.

Issue 15 saw Rick Veitch and Steve Bissette provide guest art, and also saw the debut of the backup story Swords of Texas, which tied into the main Scout storyline and was drawn by Ben Dunn. Issue #16 was converted to 3D by Ray Zone, using stereoscopy technology. Truman also recorded a theme tune for the series with his side project band The Dixie Pistols, and a flexi disc containing the track "Blues Crusade" was bundled with Scout #19.

=== Swords of Texas and New America ===
In 1987 Truman and colleague Chuck Dixon set up 4Winds Productions, a joint studio and packaging operation. Scout continued to be distributed through Eclipse, and to fresh the title and advance the narrative Truman decided to end the title after 24 issues and take a four-month sabbatical. During this period he oversaw a pair of linked 4-issue limited series set in the Scout universe; Swords of Texas was written by Dixon with art by Dunn, and concerned the adventures of the titular smugglers, previously introduced in a backup strip. New America was written by John Ostrander and Kim Yale with art by Gary Kwapisz; the series covered a 10-year period through the eyes of supporting character Rosa Winter. A short limited edition comic depicting Santana's wedding was included with the Dixie Pistols' album Marauder.

=== Scout: War Shaman ===
These titles were followed by Truman's return in Scout: War Shaman, a six-weekly ongoing picking up the main character's story over a decade after the events of Scout #24, with the lead now a widowed father of two. To promote the new series, retailers were encouraged to create a display for the series in order to win original Truman artwork. The first issue reached #98 on Diamond Comic Distributors' chart in January 1988, a solid performance for an Eclipse title. Truman also produced the Scout Handbook, a collection of profiles, maps and other material, while Eclipse collected Scout #1-7 in the trade paperback Scout - The Four Monsters. While War Shaman #2 was delayed due to colourist Sam Parsons falling ill, War Shaman became monthly from #3. Scout: War Shaman #8-9 featured the character Beau La Duke (a fictionalised version of Eclipse sales manager Beau Smith), who then appeared in a backup strip in #14-16. As planned by Truman, the series ended after 16 issues, ending with Rosa killing Scout. Truman stated that Santana would not be resurrected, with the series instead slated to continue with the wider supporting cast he had built up.

=== Marauder and Blue Leader ===
A third book called Scout: Marauder was planned to succeed War Shaman, while Eclipse also produced a second trade called Scout: Mount Fire, compiling #8-14 of the first series. Truman planned a two-year break from Scout while he worked on other projects; however, Eclipse folded in 1994 before any new material could be published. As Truman retained ownership of Scout he was eventually able to seek out other publishers for Marauder and the planned fourth and final storyline, Blue Leader. Between 2006 and 2008 Dynamite Entertainment produced trade paperbacks, printing the first two-thirds of the first Scout series. Truman subsequently raised funds to continue the story himself via Kickstarter. As of 2024 work on Scout: Marauder as a full-length graphic novel is ongoing.

As of August 2026, the project is over seven years late.

== Plot ==
At the end of the 20th century, a history of ecological excesses has led other nations to levy vast sanctions against the USA for stealing world resources. Emanuel Santana is born in an Apache reservation in New Mexico's White Mountains before being taken away as a 'Schoolboy' - a term for teenage recruits effectively conscripted for the National Guard. Finding the values imparted to be contrary to those of his people, in 1999 Santana escapes after two years and uses the military knowledge gained from the programme to combat the Great Monsters of the Apache after receiving a vision. The four Great Monsters have taken on new forms in pastoral America - Owl Giant Man is a misogynistic pornographer; the Buffalo Monster is now Chippy Waltz, comedian turned Secretary of Agriculture; Antelope Monster runs a vast, controlling media empire; and Eagle Monster is an oil baron based on an airship. Meanwhile Santana is being hunted by two former Schoolboy colleagues, Rossana Winter and Raymond Vaughn. He is aided by Missy, a 17-year old previously employed by the Owl Giant Man, and Gahn, his Apache spirit guide.

== Reception ==
Author Michael A. Sheyahshe noted in Native Americans in Comic Books – A Critical Study, that "Scout is presented in a respectful and genuine manner with tribally specific cultural ties". Another aspect of Scout to draw attention was the inclusion of a non-sensationalist lesbian relationship between Rosa Winter and US President Laura Carver, still a rare phenomenon in mainstream comics at the time. In 1988, Truman would also state that another supporting character - Avner Glansman - was gay but it had yet to become relevant to the plot. Reviewing the first issue for Amazing Heroes, R.A. Jones praised most of the book - aside from the characterisation of Gahn, comparing the character to a "Jewish uncle" and feeling he undercut the tone of the rest of the book. Scout was shortlisted for 'Best New Title' at the 1986 Kirby Awards, losing out to fellow Eclipse series Miracleman. Truman's art for the title also gained a nomination for the same year's Comics Buyer's Guide Awards.

== Collected editions ==
=== Eclipse Comics ===
Title	ISBN	Release date	Issues
Scout - Four Monsters	9780913035337	23 February 1988	Scout #1-7
Scout - Mount Fire	9780913035153	1989	Scout #8-14

=== Dynamite Entertainment ===
Title	ISBN	Release date	Issues
Scout - Volume 1	1-933305-95-9	November 2006	Scout #1-7
Scout - Volume 2	1-933305-60-6	August 2008	Scout #8-16

== Film adaptation ==
In October 2016, Christopher MacBride was set to adapt and direct a Scout feature film for the big screen for Studio 8. Jon Silk and Hell or High Water’s Braden Aftergood were to produce the film and Truman serving as a consultant.
