= List of DC Comics characters: L =

== L-Ron ==
L-Ron is originally the robot companion of Manga Khan before being traded to the Justice League in exchange for Despero. L-Ron assists the League in various non-combat roles (mainly administration and maintenance). L-Ron later has his consciousness transferred into Despero's body to stop the villain's latest rampage. Despero is transferred into L-Ron's body and attacks Justice League International, but is shot by a duck hunter, destroying his body. In Despero's body, L-Ron continues to associate with the League, becoming a member of the Justice League Task Force.

The post-New 52 incarnation of L-Ron, introduced in the Fire & Ice: Welcome to Smallville miniseries, is an assistant to the titular characters.

=== L-Ron in other media ===
L-Ron appears in the Young Justice episode "Cornered", voiced by Phil LaMarr. This version is a majordomo and spokesperson for Despero.

== La Dama ==
La Dama is the aunt of Brenda Del Vecchio and a leading figure in El Paso's criminal underworld. Blue Beetle and the Posse work to spring Posse member Probe from La Dama's prison Warehouse 13, where they encounter La Dama's minion Headmaster. During the fight, Blue Beetle encounters La Dama and learns that she is Brenda's aunt.

In The New 52 continuity, La Dama claims to be an entity older than time and uses the alias Amparo Cardenas. Additionally, La Dama killed Brenda's father so that she can take Brenda under her wing. La Dama's operatives Brutale, Bone-Crusher, and Coyote compete with Brotherhood of Evil members Phobia, Plasmus and Warp to obtain the Blue Beetle scarab, attacking Jaime Reyes and Paco Testas which causes the Blue Beetle scarab to activate. After both sides are defeated, La Dama kills Coyote for her agents' failure.

=== La Dama in other media ===
La Dama appears in Catwoman: Hunted, voiced by Jacqueline Obradors. This version is a member of Leviathan.

== Lady Chronos ==
Lady Chronos (Jia), a young Chinese woman from Hong Kong, was the longtime sweetheart of Ryan Choi. Eventually, Jia and Ryan parted, and she ended up marrying Alvin, a jock. Ryan Choi, now an American teacher and the new Atom, at Ivy University, was contacted again by Jia, claiming that Alvin, who had died in unclear circumstances, had resurfaced as an undead being who was harassing and stalking her. Ryan, still carrying a torch for Jia, returned to Hong Kong to fend off Alvin and his undead gang of bullies. Alvin reveals that Jia had brutally killed him, and she was far from helpless.

Sometime after that, Jia came into possession of David Clinton's research, and became the third Chronos, later Lady Chronos. Wearing a female version of Clinton's outfit, she allied with Clinton in his attempt to destroy Ivy Town and ruin the Atom's reputation for good.

=== Lady Chronos in other media ===
Lady Chronos appears in The Flash episode "Partners in Time", portrayed by Diana Bang.

== Lady Eve ==
Lady Eve is a supervillainess created by Mike W. Barr and Alan Davis, making her first appearance in Batman and the Outsiders #24 (August 1985).

Eve first met the terrorist cult leader Kobra (Jeffrey Burr) in Egypt, where she nursed him back to health. In gratitude, Kobra offered Eve to join him in exchange for a better life. She accepted and eventually became Kobra's lover, as well as a high-ranking member of the Kobra cult. When Strike Force Kobra is defeated by the Outsiders, Eve calls Kobra for help, only for him to tell them to surrender. This action causes strain between Kobra and Lady Eve.

In the series JSA, Lady Eve appears as a member of the Injustice Society.

=== Lady Eve in other media ===
- Lady Eve appears in Justice League Adventures #23.
- Lady Eve appears in Black Lightning, portrayed by Jill Scott. This version is Evelyn Stillwater-Ferguson, the owner of a funeral parlor and member of a secret group of corrupt leaders with ties to Tobias Whale, the 100, Peter Gambi, and Lazarus Prime. After Gambi frames Eve's group for Joey Toledo's death, Whale kills her to avenge him. Eve is later resurrected, becomes the head of the business Ultimate O, and forms a competitive rivalry with the 100.
- Lady Eve appears in Batman: Soul of the Dragon, voiced by Grey DeLisle. This version is a member of Kobra who is later killed by Shiva.

== Lady Flash ==
Lady Flash (Ivana Molotova) was a Soviet speedster of Blue Trinity, created by Pytor Orloff and manipulated by Vandal Savage, which resulted in encounters with Wally West before finding more as Savitar's acolyte, but dies accidentally while encountering Barry Allen due to Eobard Thawne. Molotova was reintroduced in Doomsday Clock as a member of People's Heroes, a Russian team.

== Lady Liberty ==
Lady Liberty is the name of four characters in the DC Comics universe.

=== First Lady Liberty ===
The first Lady Liberty is a member of the Force of July, a government-sponsored superhero team. She first appeared in Batman and the Outsiders Annual #1 (1984). Her costume consists of robes and a crown based on the Statue of Liberty, and she speaks with a French accent.

She appears in the Outsiders 1987 special, fighting off a combined Outsiders/Infinity Inc. infiltration of the Force of July's California headquarters. Her team is initially successful, subduing and capturing all of the heroes.

Lady Liberty appears again during the Janus Directive event. The Suicide Squad is manipulated into attacking the group, during which Mayflower and Sparkler are killed. Lady Liberty then sacrifices herself to destroy Kobra.

Lady Liberty is shown to be alive following the Infinite Frontier relaunch, where she is recruited by the Penguin, but she is killed in battle soon afterward.

=== Second Lady Liberty ===
In Crisis Aftermath: The Battle for Blüdhaven #1 (Early June 2006), a second Lady Liberty appears as a member of Freedom's Ring which are employed by the government to defend Blüdhaven from metahuman forces. Lady Liberty is killed by Nuclear Legion member Geiger in this same issue.

=== Third Lady Liberty ===
When S.H.A.D.E. takes control of Freedom's Ring, an unnamed agent is a third Lady Liberty before being killed by Ravager.

=== Fourth Lady Liberty ===
A fourth Lady Liberty, a member of S.H.A.D.E.'s First Strike team, is introduced in Uncle Sam and the Freedom Fighters (vol. 1) #4 (December 2006). As her powers stem from her costume, she is stripped of her robes and left, naked and devoid of powers, on a naturist beach by the Ray. Apparently she rejoins S.H.A.D.E. with new equipment, still fighting against the Freedom Fighters team.

== Lady Lunar ==
Lady Lunar (Stacy Macklin) is a character appearing in American comic books published by DC Comics. Created by Jack C. Harris and José Delbo, she first appeared in Wonder Woman #252 (February 1979).

Stacy Macklin is an astronaut in training who was transformed into Lady Lunar after being exposed to a capsule held in S.T.A.R. Labs, gaining the ability to manipulate gravity. Lady Lunar attempts to destroy Metropolis using a bomb created by S.T.A.R. Labs, but is defeated when Superman bathes her in sunlight, returning her to her normal self. Lady Lunar later appears in Crisis on Infinite Earths, having returned to villainy. Lady Lunar made no appearances in post-Crisis continuity.

=== Lady Lunar in other media ===
- Lady Lunar makes non-speaking appearances in Justice League Unlimited as a member of Gorilla Grodd's Secret Society.
- Lady Lunar appears as a character summon in Scribblenauts Unmasked: A DC Comics Adventure.

== Ladybug ==
Ladybug (Rosibel Rivera) is a character appearing in American comic books published by DC Comics. She was introduced in the storyline "The New Golden Age" as the forgotten sidekick of Red Bee.

Rosibel Rivera immigrated to the United States with her parents Miguel and Ana. The Rivera family established Big Bee Ranch where they met Rick Raleigh. When Big Bee Ranch was vandalized by gangsters who wanted the Rivera family to pay them protection money, Red Bee saved them. Unfortunately, the local chief of police was corrupt and had the criminals freed and their charges dropped. Rosibel made her own costume and helped Red Bee expose the corrupt chief of police. As a thanks to Red Bee, Miguel and Ana offered their farm for Red Bee to use as a hideout. Upon stumbling onto Red Bee's hideout, Rosibel was exposed to a confiscated weapon of Professor Pollen that shrunk her to the size of a ladybug. Red Bee was able to reverse the effects of the weapon, but Rosibel was left with the ability to shrink at will as a side effect. Rosibel built a ladybug-themed outfit with functional wings and became Red Bee's sidekick.

Ladybug is among the sidekicks who are kidnapped by Childminder and held on Orphan Island. She is later rescued by Stargirl and transported to the present day by Hourman.

== Lagomorph ==
Lagomorph was a supervillain and member of the Superior Five. She was an evil counterpart of Dumb Bunny of the Inferior Five. Together with her teammates, she was exiled on Salvation.

== Lewis Lang ==
Lewis Lang is an archaeologist and father of Lana Lang, who travelled across the world, while leaving his daughter under Jonathan and Martha Kent's care. During one of his many travels, he discovered the Helmet of Chaos, that possessed his assistant and transformed him into Doctor Chaos.

=== Lewis Lang in other media ===
Lewis Lang appears in flashbacks in Smallville, portrayed by Ben Odberg. This version is the legal, but not biological, father of Lana Lang, as his wife had an affair during a brief separation. Both Lewis and his wife died during the meteor shower that happened when fragments of Krypton landed on Earth.

== Francine Langstrom ==
Francine Langstrom (née March) was the fiancée of scientist Kirk Langstrom at the time that she first encountered Batman. It was Batman who first revealed to Francine that Kirk had mutated himself into the feral Man-Bat. At one point, Batman had captured the Man-Bat and tried to give him an antidote to his condition, but the Man-Bat fought him at every turn. He even tried bringing Francine to the Batcave in the hopes that she could convince Langstrom to take the antidote willingly.

Kirk escaped, however, and when he next reunited with Francine, forced her to take the same bat gland extract that he had taken as proof of her love and devotion to him. Like Kirk, Francine mutated into a bat-like creature. The two "Man-Bats" decided to marry one another. At their wedding, they donned latex masks to disguise their features, but Batman interrupted the ceremony and exposed them in front of all their guests. Batman fought against Francine and Kirk and was finally able to defeat them by using the cathedral's bells to incapacitate them. Upon doing so, Batman administered his cure to both of them, turning them back to normal.

In 2011, "The New 52" rebooted the DC universe. Francine Langstrom was reimagined as a more villainous character who only married Kirk to ensure that he would complete the Man-Bat serum, planning to have him killed afterwards so she could inherit a large sum of money.

In the 2021 Man-Bat miniseries, Francine appears to no longer be a villain and has gotten back together with Kirk. However, she leaves him once again when she discovers he is still attempting to perfect the Man-Bat formula to cure his sister's deafness. Kirk ultimately accepts he and Francine cannot be happy together and promises not to interfere in her life as he willingly gives himself up to the police, eventually joining Wonder Woman's Justice League Dark.

=== Francine Langstrom in other media ===
- Francine Langstrom appears in media set in the DC Animated Universe (DCAU), voiced by the late Meredith MacRae.
  - Introduced in the Batman: The Animated Series episode "On Leather Wings", she, her father Robert March, and husband Kirk Langstrom meet Bruce Wayne before she is caught in a battle between Batman and Kirk as the Man-Bat. In the episode "Terror in the Sky", Francine is accidentally exposed to a fruit bat-based serum created by March and transforms into the She-Bat before Batman cures her.
  - Francine makes a non-speaking cameo appearance in The New Batman Adventures episode "Chemistry".
- Francine Langstrom appears in Son of Batman, voiced by Diane Michelle.
- Francine Langstrom appears in Batman: Arkham Knight. This version was seemingly killed by Kirk after his transformation into the Man-Bat, with Batman finding her corpse while investigating the Langstroms' laboratory. If he revisits the lab after curing and incarcerating Kirk, he finds Francine's body gone and a broken television screen with the words "Forever my love" written on it in an unknown substance, implying that she transformed and escaped.
- Francine Langstrom / She-Bat appears in the DC Super Hero Girls two-part episode "#NightmareInGotham", voiced by Tara Strong. This version developed the She-Bat serum herself. She is forcibly transformed by the Joker in a plot to destroy Gotham City on Halloween, but is cured by Bumblebee.

== Lashorr ==
Lashorr is the Green Lantern of Sector 3453. She first appeared in Green Lantern (vol. 4) #12 (July 2006) in a story written by Geoff Johns and drawn by Ivan Reis. Lashorr had a fling with a younger Salaak before she vanished in combat with the Dominators. She is discovered alive on the Manhunter homeworld of Biot and returned to her sector, albeit with a case of post-traumatic stress disorder.

== Edward Lawton ==
Edward Robert "Eddie" Lawton is the older brother of Floyd Lawton / Deadshot. The Lawton brothers are raised in a wealthy family who repeatedly judged Floyd for not matching Edward's achievements of academics and sports. Edward is manipulated by their mother to kill their father, but Floyd's interference accidentally causes Edward's death.

== George Lawton ==
George Lawton is the abusive father of Floyd Lawton / Deadshot. He was created by John Ostrander and Kim Yale, and made his first appearance in Deadshot vol. 1 #2 (December 1988). The father who raised Floyd and Edward Lawton in a wealthy family that has great influence over the community as he owns interests in much of the local real estate and hold sway over the local police, George and Genevieve are a power couple in society circles yet they hate each other in private. George's infidelities motivated his wife to have Eddie kill George, resulting in Floyd's accidental killing of Eddie and George's paralysis.

== Genevieve Lawton ==
Genevieve Lawton is the heiress mother of Deadshot (Floyd Lawton). She was created by John Ostrander and Kim Yale, and made her first appearance in Deadshot vol. 1 #3 (December 1988). The mother who raised Floyd and Edward Lawton in a wealthy family that has great influence, she is a prize-winning sharp shooter who controls banking businesses. Genevieve and George are a power couple in society circles, but they hate each other in private. Genevieve gets tired of the many abuses so Edward tries to kill George, but Floyd accidentally kills Edward who shatters George's spine. Genevieve's punishment is her husband refuses to divorce and instead forces her to live on a limited allowance and in isolation in a smaller house on the outskirts of town. Deadshot later returns and confronts Genevieve who shot in the spine to be a paraplegic.

== Suchin Lawton ==
Suchin Lawton is a child of Deadshot (Floyd Lawton).

Edward "Eddie" Lawton was created by John Ostrander and Kim Yale, and made his first appearance in Deadshot vol. 1 #1 (December 1988). Eddie is Deadshot's son who was about eight years old when he's kidnapped by a gang of criminals, but Wes Anselm accidentally kills Eddie to which Deadshot's revenge on Eddie's killer.

The New 52 reintroduces the character as Suchin, Deadshot's daughter.

== Susan Lawton ==
Susan Lawton is the estranged wife of Deadshot (Floyd Lawton) and the mother of Eddie Lawton. She was created by John Ostrander and Kim Yale, and made her first appearance in Deadshot vol. 1 #1 (November 1988). Susan and Floyd were married and they have Eddie together, but Floyd divorces Susan and leaves due to not wanting to endanger the lives of loved ones.

=== Susan Lawton in other media ===
An amalgamated character hybridized with Michelle Torres named Susie Lawton appears in the Arrow episode "Suicidal Tendencies", portrayed by Erika Walter. This version is the wife of Floyd Lawton and the mother of Zoe Lawton.

== Zoe Lawton ==
Zoe Torres-Lawton is the daughter of Deadshot (Floyd Lawton). She was created by Christos Gage and Steven Cummings, and made her first appearance in Deadshot vol. 2 #1 (February 2005).

Zoe is illegitimate daughter of Michelle Torres and Floyd. Her mother gave up prostitution and drugs for Zoe's sake and moved them to a poor neighborhood in Star City, where she was raised for four years without her father's knowledge of her existence.

DC Rebirth revamped the character with training under the names Rekoil and Liveshot.

=== Zoe Lawton in other media ===
- Zoe Lawton makes a non-speaking cameo appearance in Batman: Assault on Arkham.
- Zoe Lawton appears in Suicide Squad, portrayed by Shailyn Pierre-Dixon.
- Zoe Lawton makes a non-speaking cameo appearance in Suicide Squad: Hell to Pay.
- Zoe Lawton available in the Arrow episode "Suicidal Tendencies", portrayed by Audrey Alvarez. This version is a legitimate daughter of Deadshot and Susan Lawton.
- Zoe Lawton appears as a character summon in Scribblenauts Unmasked: A DC Comics Adventure.
- Zoe Lawton appears in Deadshot's ending in Injustice 2.
- Zoe Lawton appears as a playable DLC character in Suicide Squad: Kill the Justice League. This version is a thief in Deadshot's absence and adopted the name "Lawless".

== Legs ==
Legs is a homeless Vietnam veteran and resident of the streets of Gotham City who appeared a supporting character in various Batman-related comics during the 80s and 90s. Co-created by writers John Wagner and Alan Grant, and artist Norm Breyfogle, he first appeared in Detective Comics #587 (June 1988). Holding strong views, the character is described as being prone to frustration, anger, and alcoholism, and frequently argues with other homeless men. Legs is ironically named for his missing limbs, which he lost due to an anti-personnel mine explosion in the Vietnam War in Detective Comics #608 (November 1989). Crippled and unable to afford a wheelchair, he is shown to move about in a wheeled tray.

Legs was created during Detective Comics debut of Wagner and Grant, co-writers established for their work on Judge Dredd comics for 2000 AD. However, due to poor sales of their comics within months of their debut, which left both men questioning the viability of their new jobs, Wagner soon left the project alone to Grant. Concerned that he would be fired if his editors learned the writing team had split, Grant alerted no one to the change, and decided to continue writing stories in the pattern of the first for the duration of his original contract. Now a regular writer for Detective Comics and other Batman-related titles during this time period, Grant made frequent use of Legs as an ally for the anarchist themed character, Anarky. Legs is shown to be loyal to Anarky as a vigilante, who in turn employs Legs and other homeless men to act as diversions or spies against Batman. Anarky and Legs appear together prominently in Batman: Anarky, a trade paperback collection of comics written by Grant.

== Lesla-Lar ==
Lesla-Lar is a fictional character appearing in American comic books published by DC Comics. A foe of the Silver Age Supergirl, the character first appeared in Action Comics #279 (August 1961).

Lesla-Lar is a Kryptonian scientist from the shrunken city of Kandor. Jealous of Supergirl's fame and life, Lesla-Lar invents a device that causes Supergirl to lose her powers and takes the role of Supergirl for herself. She is able to convince Superman that she is Supergirl, and secretly meets with Lex Luthor to convince him to kill Superman. However, Krypto realizes that Lesla-Lar is an imposter and manages to send her back to Kandor.

Lesla-Lar returns in Action Comics #297 (1963), where she releases Kryptonian criminals Dru-Zod, Jax-Ur, and Kru-El from the Phantom Zone and enlists their help to recover a cache of Kryptonian weapons. After finding the cache, Kru-El tests one of the weapons on Lesla-Lar, disintegrating her.

Lesla-Lar's final appearance in pre-Crisis continuity is in The Superman Family #206 (1981). After her body was disintegrated by Kru-El, her intelligence survived in a disembodied state. The process has affected her sanity, as she now believes she and Supergirl are sisters. Lesla-Lar possesses Supergirl's body, but she manages to regain control and force out Lesla-Lar, dispersing her.

Lesla-Lar is reintroduced in the 2025 series Supergirl, where her jealousy of Supergirl is left unaltered. She invents a device that teleports herself and her Kryptonian rabbit Kandy out of Kandor and enlarges them to normal size. Having gained superpowers from Earth's yellow sun, Lesla-Lar intends to replace Supergirl as the hero of Midvale and hypnotizes her foster parents, Jeremiah and Eliza Danvers, into believing that she is Supergirl. Following a series of battles with Supergirl, Lesla-Lar reconciles with her and joins her in heroism, taking the name Luminary.

=== Lesla-Lar in other media ===
A character based on Lesla-Lar appears in Superman & Lois, portrayed by Stacey Farber. Born Irma Sayres, Leslie Larr is the personal assistant and enforcer of Morgan Edge / Tal-Rho who had gone through the X-Kryptonite experiments that allowed her to host a Kryptonian spirit, gaining Kryptonian abilities.

== Lilith ==
Lilith is a character appearing in American comic books published by DC Comics. She is based on the biblical figure of the same name.

While her history of being the original idea for a husband for Adam remains intact, she mothered numerous demons with different angels including Lucifer.

In 2011, "The New 52" rebooted the DC universe. In this version, Lilith married Cain and Abel and became the second vampire.

=== Lilith in other media ===
- Lilith appears in Lucifer, portrayed by Lesley-Ann Brandt.
- Lilith appears in Dead Boy Detectives, portrayed by Rochelle Okoye. This version is the goddess of witchcraft.
- Lilith appears as a character summon in Scribblenauts Unmasked: A DC Comics Adventure.

== Kari Limbo ==
Kari Limbo is a character appearing in American comic books published by DC Comics. She was created by writer Dennis O'Neil and artist Joe Staton, and first appeared in Green Lantern vol. 2 #117 (June 1979).

Limbo is a fortune teller who was romantically involved with Green Lanterns Guy Gardner and Hal Jordan. She was killed during the destruction of Coast City in the storyline "The Death of Superman".

== Lion-Mane ==
Lion-Mane is the name of four characters in DC Comics.

=== Lion-Mane ===
The first Lion-Mane originates from Earth-Two. He is a human with feline features and heightened strength. Lion-Mane is initially a henchman of Catwoman, who later betrays him.

=== Ed Dawson ===
The second Lion-Mane is Ed Dawson, an archaeologist who transforms into a feral were-lion after touching a mystical meteor called Mithra. After learning that the meteor's effects will eventually kill him, Dawson seeks other meteor pieces to increase his power and keep himself alive. Dawson eventually gains enough power to remotely transform others into lion-men like himself.

The character was initially removed from continuity post-Crisis/Hawkworld, but reappeared years later in the Hawkman ongoing series starring the Golden Age Hawkman and the modern Hawkgirl (Kendra Saunders). In this incarnation, Ed Dawson was an archaeologist looking for the Mithra stone with Karen Ramis. Dawson and Ramis each absorb half of the stone's power and transform into separate Lion-Manes.

Some months later, Fadeaway Man approached Ed Dawson and invited him into Alexander Luthor Jr.'s Secret Society of Super Villains.

=== Karen Ramis ===
The third Lion-Mane, introduced post-Zero Hour, is Karen Ramis, a scientist who was similarly transformed by the meteor. Hawkman convinces Ramis to give up her power, which leaves to seek another host. However, Ramis is left desperate to regain her power. She eventually succeeds, becoming Lion-Mane again.

=== Fourth Lion-Mane ===
A fourth, unidentified Lion-Mane appears in The New 52. This version resembles a lion-centaur hybrid and is a member of the Secret Society of Super Villains. Lion-Mane ruled over the Marubunta Diamond Mines in Africa. When Batwing came to Africa to shut down the Marubunta Diamond Mines, Lion-Mane was confident that his three wives could beat him. When Lion-Mane's three wives were defeated, Lion-Mane confronted Batwing himself.

During the Forever Evil storyline, Lion-Mane is among the villains recruited by the Crime Syndicate of America to join their Secret Society of Super Villains.

=== Lion-Mane in other media ===
- Lion-Mane appears in DC Universe Online. This version is a member of the Cat Avatars.
- Lion-Mane appears in DC Super Hero Girls, voiced by Khary Payton.

== Lock-Up ==
Lock-Up is a character appearing in American comic books published by DC Comics.

=== Batman: The Animated Series ===
Before appearing in the comics, Lock-Up debuted in a self-titled episode of Batman: The Animated Series, voiced by Bruce Weitz. Lyle Bolton is a security guard at Arkham Asylum who uses intimidation, excessive force, and even torture to keep inmates in line. He eventually becomes the vigilante Lock-Up in an attempt to bring peace to Gotham before Batman stops him.

=== History in the comics ===
Lock-Up's first comic appearance was in Robin (vol. 2) #24 (January 1996) in which he captured Charaxes. He subsequently appeared in Detective Comics #694 (February 96) in which he captured the minor villain Allergent. In both of these stories, he only made a brief appearance at the end, removing the villain before Batman and Robin could return to the scene.

His first full appearance was in Detective Comics #697-699 (June–August 1996), which began with him capturing Two-Face and taking him to his private prison alongside Charaxes, Allergent, and several gangsters. He is stopped by the police while targeting a criminal-turned-state's evidence and is revealed to be Lyle Bolton, previously discharged from the police academy for being too gung-ho, and dismissed from several security jobs (unlike the animated version, he had not worked at Arkham). Lock-Up escapes, and captures minor street criminal Alvin Draper (actually Tim Drake's undercover identity).

When Nightwing finds his hideout, Lock-Up drowns all his prisoners in an underwater death-trap. Batman intervenes and defeats Lock-Up, saving the villains, Nightwing, and Robin.

Lock-Up later appeared during the No Man's Land storyline, having taken control of Blackgate Penitentiary in the aftermath of the earthquake. He had enlisted KGBeast and the Trigger Twins to act as wardens for his prison, and rules with an iron fist; Batman only tolerates his presence because he requires Lock-Up to keep captured criminals in check to prevent Gotham being overrun, although Lock-Up is under strict orders to treat the prisoners well. Towards the end of the storyline, Batman enlists Dick Grayson's help in overthrowing Lock-Up so Blackgate could be used for the lawful side once again.

Lock-Up makes a brief appearance in Villains United: Infinite Crisis Special, where the Society recruits him to orchestrate prison breaks worldwide.

Lock-Up allies with Ventriloquist, alongside other Gotham criminals Killer Moth and Firefly. During this association, Lock-Up is wounded by Metropolis outfits Intergang and the 100. After recovering, he is sent to another planet in Salvation Run.

=== Lock-Up in other media ===
- Lock-Up appears in the Arrowverse tie-in comic Arrow 2.5. This version is a member of the Renegades, a Blüdhaven mercenary unit.
- Lyle Bolton appears as a boss in Batman: Arkham Shadow, voiced by Earl Baylon. This version works for the TYGER Security private military firm and serves as head of security at Blackgate Prison, where he and the other guards are known to regularly abuse and inflict harsh punishments on the inmates. Bolton holds all criminals in low regard and used to greatly admire Batman for his fearsome reputation, but becomes disillusioned with the hero after he opposes Bolton's tyrannical methods. During the game's epilogue, Bolton is fired from his position at Blackgate and arrested for his power abuse and for supposedly assisting the Rat King.

== Mar Londo ==
Mar Londo is a character appearing in American comic books published by DC Comics. He was created by Edmond Hamilton and John Forte, and first appeared in Adventure Comics #327 (December 1964).

Mar Londo is a Zuunian and the father of Legionnaire Timber Wolf (Brin Londo). A scientist and doctor, Mar created a group of androids to retrieve Zuunium from the caverns of Zuun. Karth Arn, the sole survivor of the androids, returned to the surface. Mar used the zuunium in an experimental process to give Brin superpowers before dying shortly afterward. Karth Arn used a special gun to inflict Brin with amnesia, assuming his identity, while Brin believed himself to be Karth Arn. After the ruse is exposed, Brainiac 5 restores Brin's memories.

=== Mar Londo in other media ===
Mar Londo appears in Legion of Super Heroes, voiced by Harry Lennix in the first season and Dorian Harewood in the second. This version gave Brin Londo powers through genetic engineering, transforming him into a wolf-like creature for use as a weapon. After being restored to a humanoid form, Brin joins the Legion of Super-Heroes, leaving Mar behind.

== Lord Satanis ==
Lord Satanis is a fictional villain published by DC Comics who debuted in Action Comics #527 (January 1982), created by Marv Wolfman and Curt Swan. Lord Satanis is a powerful sorcerer from a million years in the future where humanity have regressed to a medieval society. Satanis battles his wife, Syrene, for Merlin's runestone as his protector Ambra is his constant foe. The artifact will make one of them extremely powerful and allow them to rule Earth, but only through an invulnerable body which brings them to Superman. Satanis and Syrene split Superman in half and send one of the Supermen to the past. After one of the Supermen is killed, Satanis possesses his body and uses it to fight Syrene and Superman's other half. Superman defeats Satanis and returns Satanis and Syrene to their time.

== Love Glove ==
Love Glove (Bobby Carmichael) is a man who was able to access the "Glove Tree", a tree with gloves instead of leaves, after coming across it in a dream. The tree replaced his arm with a portal that granted him access to any of its gloves, using them to gain different powers. As a member of the Brotherhood of Dada, he was about to betray the group, but ended up saving Mr. Nobody.

== Lunkhead ==
Lunkhead is an enemy of Batman who became an inmate at Arkham Asylum. Lunkhead was clearly stupid, but exhibited massive strength; he made an enemy of the Ventriloquist (Arnold Wesker) when he smashed Wesker's companion, Scarface. He was sacrificed to the devil by a pack of demons, along with many others, when the Ventriloquist threw his voice to make it seem as though Lunkhead was volunteering to be thrown into the fiery pit.

=== Lunkhead in other media ===
- Lunkhead appears in Beware the Batman, voiced by JB Blanc. This version is a reformed criminal who underwent rehabilitation in Blackgate Penitentiary.
- Lunkhead appears in the Gotham episode "A Dark Knight: One of My Three Soups", portrayed by Hank Strong. This version is an African-American strongman .

== Lupek ==
Lupek is the name of two characters appearing in American comic books published by DC Comics.

=== Lupek (DNAlien) ===
Lupek is a wolf-like DNAlien from the artificial planet Transilvane. He and Dragorin search for their creator Dabney Donovan, during which they encounter Superman and Jimmy Olsen. Both of them later find Transilvane in an abandoned graveyard and learn of a "Demon Dog" that threatens Transilvane. Once Superman stops the "Demon Dog", which was actually a device filled with chemical defoliant, Lupek and his fellow monsters return to Transilvane.

=== Lupek (wolverine) ===
The Metropolis Zoo was raided by Dragorin, who obtained a wolverine for Dabney Donovan to make use of. Donovan does off-screen experiments on the wolverine and transforms it into a humanoid form called Lupek. A captive Guardian battles Lupek in a cage match and manages to defeat him after a long battle.

== Anthony Lupus ==
Anthony Lupus is a former Olympic Decathlon champion who suffers from severe headaches until he meets Professor Milo, who uses a drug to treat them and transforms him into a werewolf in the process. Bruce Wayne later meets Anthony's younger sister Angela who is in need of a bone marrow transplant. After going to Alaska and catching Anthony, Batman persuades him to help Angela while promising to help cure Anthony.

In the 2023 series Tales of the Titans, Deathstroke employs Lupus while fighting Beast Boy. Lupus intends to cure himself by using a serum created from Beast Boy's blood. Instead, the serum strengthens Lupus' wolf form, gives it the capability of speech, and awakens its dormant personality, which had been separate from Lupus for some time. The wolf confronts Beast Boy, who subdues it until the sun rises and reverts Lupus to his human form.

=== Anthony Lupus in other media ===
- A character inspired by Anthony Lupus named Anthony Romulus appears in the Batman: The Animated Series episode "Moon of the Wolf", voiced by Harry Hamlin, while the vocal effects for his werewolf form are provided by Frank Welker.
- Anthony Romulus appears in The Batman Adventures #21.

== Lillian Luthor ==
Lillian Luthor was the mother of Alexander Luthor and Julian Luthor, as well as the wife of Lionel Luthor.

=== Smallville ===
Lillian Luthor (portrayed by Alisen Down) had a long and prolific role in the TV series Smallville. She killed her infant son Julian to spare him from Lionel's abuse, blaming Lex for doing so. However, stress causes Lillian to deteriorate and die, estranged from her family. In subsequent appearances, Lillian appears in hallucinations that Lex suffers.

=== Lillian Luthor in comics ===
In DC Comics, Lex Luthor's mother is named Arlene Luthor. In later incarnations, her name was changed to Leticia.

=== Lillian Luthor in other media ===
- Lillian Luthor appears in Supergirl, portrayed by Brenda Strong. This version is the leader of Project Cadmus.
- Lillian Luthor appears in the Superman & Lois episode "Break the Cycle", portrayed by Nesta Chapman.

== Lori Luthor ==
Lori Luthor is a character appearing in American comic books published by DC Comics. She is Lena Luthor's daughter and Lex Luthor's niece who turned to crime to provide for her mother, attracting the attention of Superboy.

== Nasthalthia Luthor ==
Nasthalthia Luthor is a character appearing in American comic books published by DC Comics. She is the niece of Lex Luthor who has antagonized Supergirl on occasion.

=== Nasthalthia Luthor in other media ===
Nasthalthia Luthor appears in All-Star Superman, voiced by Linda Cardellini.
