= American Flagg! =

American comic book series by Howard Chaykin

- American Flagg! #1 (Oct. 1983), cover art by Howard Chaykin.

Publication information
- Publisher: First Comics
- Format: Ongoing series
- Genre: Science fiction
- Publication date: October 1983 – March 1988
- No. of issues: 50

Creative team
- Created by: Howard Chaykin
- Written by: Howard Chaykin
- Artist: Howard Chaykin
- Letterer: Ken Bruzenak
- Colorist: Lynn Varley
- Editor: Mike Gold

Collected editions
- Volume 1: ISBN 1-58240-983-8

American Flagg! is an American comic book series created by writer-artist Howard Chaykin, published by First Comics from 1983 to 1989. A science fiction series and political satire, it was set in the U.S., particularly Chicago, Illinois, in the early 2030s. Writers besides Chaykin included Steven Grant, J. M. DeMatteis, Alan Moore and John Francis Moore.

== Publication history ==
American Flagg, which ran 50 issues (October 1983 – March 1988), was one of the first titles to be published by First Comics, an early alternative press comics company founded in Evanston, Illinois in 1983. Unusually for the time in the US, the company offered its freelance writers and artists creator rights, including ownership of their creations. Regardless, writer-artist Howard Chaykin, then living in New York City, felt trepidation when First Comics approached him to do a project. He recalled in 2010:

My concern had all and everything to do with the fact that this was a brand new company, located in [a suburb of] Chicago. I'd always worked for companies I'd visited and had day-to-day-dealings with. [But] they talked about a financial plan that would make it possible for me to get out from under the debt I had accrued working for [publisher] Byron Preiss [illustrating early graphic novels]. It was encouraging, so I went home and concocted a scenario, a pitch document, and that was it.

Chaykin devised a series set in 2031, a high-tech but spiritually empty, consumerist world in which the American government has relocated to Mars, leaving what remains of the U.S. to be governed by the all-encompassing corporation known as the Plex. The series star is Reuben Flagg, a former TV star drafted into the Plexus Rangers and posted as a deputy in Chicago, Illinois.

The first 12 issues, running through cover-date September 1984, consisted of four interlocking, three-issue story arcs. Chaykin recalled his difficulty in producing 28 pages of art and script monthly: "I was still a smoker and a drinker at the time. And [the output was such that] I'd never done anything like that before, and it was insane. It just devoured my life [and] I had no assistants. I didn't know how to work with an assistant at that point, and it was a very difficult process. ... I was trying to do a fairly high-quality product and I didn't want to slough it off".

Chaykin made wide use of Craftint Duoshade illustration boards for American Flagg!, which in the period before computers, enabled him to add shaded textures to the finished art. Ken Bruzenak's lettering and logowork also won notice, as it was integral to American Flagg's futuristic, trademark-littered ambiance.

American Flagg's first dozen issues form one complete story that has influenced comic creators including Brian Michael Bendis and Warren Ellis. The comic made a huge splash at the 1984 Eagle Awards, the United Kingdom's pre-eminent comics awards. Chaykin and American Flagg! were nominated for ten awards, eventually winning seven. American Flagg! also won the 1983 Comics Buyer's Guide Fan Award for Favorite Comic Book and tied for the 1983 CBG Award for Favorite Character (Reuben Flagg).

After issue #12, Chaykin continued the series while also working on such other projects as his revamp of The Shadow for DC Comics and the graphic novel Time^{2}, based on characters introduced in a one-off American Flagg! special in 1986. During this time, Alan Moore wrote a back-up story that ran several issues and concluded in an issue-length story.

Eventually, Chaykin left, to be replaced on a regular basis by first Steven Grant then J. M. DeMatteis. Grant left after only seven issues due to creative friction with the series's new artist, Mark Badger. According to Grant, he had wanted to continue doing stories in the same style that Chaykin had established, while Badger wanted to take the series in new directions. Chaykin returned for a brief run to wrap up storylines before the first volume ended in March 1988. The title was relaunched a few months later as Howard Chaykin's American Flagg! (stylized as Howard Chaykin's АМЗЯІКАИ FLAGG!). This run saw Chaykin return to write the first issue before handing over to John Francis Moore, with Mike Vosburg and Richard Ory penciling and inking the interior art, but the franchise failed to recapture its early success and was canceled after 12 issues.

== Plot synopsis ==
The story takes place in the year 2031, after a series of worldwide crises called the Year of the Domino (1996) has forced the U.S. government and the heads of major corporations to relocate to Hammarskjold Center, on Mars ("temporarily, of course"). In the wake of the American government leaving the planet and the Soviet Union collapsing from Islamic insurrections, there was a power shift throughout the world, with Brazilian Union of the Americas and the Pan-African League becoming the new superpowers on Earth.

The exiled American government, its corporate backers, and a group of technicians in the defected Soviet lunar colony of Gagaringrad form the Plex: a giant, interplanetary union of corporate and government concerns that conduct commerce and govern the United States from its capital on Mars. Many population centers are grouped around massive, fortified arcologies called Plexmalls and the law is enforced by the Plexus Rangers, the absentee Plex's Earthside militia.

The Plex has formed the Tricentennial Recovery Committee, to get America "back on track for '76", but the TRC is in reality a plan to sell the United States off to the new superpowers and to leech off the remaining inhabitants before gaining true self-sufficiency. As a result, the Plex has outlawed non-combat related education, organized sports such as basketball and personal aircraft, restricted media to only one outlet, the Plex itself (although it has multiple channels), and advocates and glorifies the use of political violence amongst independent policlubs by providing money and firearms for its hit TV show Firefight All Night LIVE!, and covertly sterilizes the population by using a combination contraceptive and antibiotic called Mañanacillin to reduce the population.

This all changes when former television star Reuben Flagg is drafted and transferred to Chicago's Plexmall to replace the local Ranger Hilton "Hammerhead" Krieger's fallen partner. He witnesses widespread graft and corruption throughout the Plexmall, but also a series of subliminal messages implanted in a television show that are causing outbreaks of gang violence. After he uses his emergency powers to interrupt the broadcast, he not only ends the violence, but also brings forth a series of events that causes the Plex to send in covert agents, the death of Hilton, and the unveiling of Q-USA, a secret TV station owned and operated by Krieger that opens Flagg's eyes to the nature of the Plex.

As the series progressed, Chaykin took less and less of a direct role in scripting and plotting the stories out, and by the third year of its run, he had nothing to do with the book other than cover art. Stories began to violate the rules that Chaykin had explicitly stated in the writer's bible for the series (for instance, California was said to have slid into the Pacific Ocean, but in the final year of the book, California was merely shown to have been abandoned for reasons that were vague at best), and characterizations began to drift considerably as well. Among other things, Flagg abandoned his interest in 1930s jazz, and was frequently shown listening to late-1960s rock, as well as becoming more of a traditional stern-jawed good-guy hero. After trying and failing several times to shore up declining interests, First Comics decided to lure Chaykin back into the writer's seat. American Flagg! wrapped up its principal storyline with issue #50. By this time, Reuben Flagg had traveled to Mars, overthrown the Plex, and become President of the United States. He then decided to separate Illinois from the United States and run it as his own personal fiefdom. All issues of this series took place in the year 2031.

The next year, the comic was re-launched under the name Howard Chaykin's American Flagg! (stylized as "АМЗЯІКАИ" to reflect the fact that most of this series takes place in Russia) and picked up from where the earlier book had left off (in 2032). There is some difference of opinion as to whether this new book was intended to be a limited run, or open-ended as is the norm with comics. In either case, it ended after twelve issues. The final issue ends with a photo album of the Flagg's future domestic life, with many kids, a screaming shrew of a wife, and a balding, overweight Flagg.

== Characters ==
- Reuben Flagg, born in 2000 at Hammarskjold Center, Mars, to Axel and Rebecca Flagg, was a stand-up comic and popular television star of the show Mark Thrust, Sexus Ranger. After he was made superfluous by CGI technology, he joined the Plexus Rangers and emigrated to Earth, being stationed in the Chicago Plexmall. Flagg is Jewish, and his parents' "undesirably bohemian" attitudes have given him an idealistic view of the United States that runs contrary to the Plex. He has a desire to set things right again, and through inheriting Q-USA, begins to set on that path.
- Raul the cat is an intelligent, talking orange tabby housecat. With the exception of his intelligence and his ability to speak (an ability whose origin is never explained), he appears to be otherwise a normal house pet, but has a customized set of cybernetic gloves, designed by Mandy Krieger, that give him opposable thumbs.
- Hilton "Hammerhead" Krieger was Flagg's superior at the Chicago Plexmall. A co-founder of the Genetic Warlords motorcycle gang along with Charles Blitz, but after his 13th arrest, the Plex drafts him because of his criminal experience. Intending to take advantage of the fledgling organization, he meets his future wife Peggy and stays with the Rangers. He does not trust anyone, not C.K., the mayor, not his wife Peg, not his daughter Mandy, and, while a Plexus Ranger, he especially does not trust the Plex. He runs an underground television station called Q-USA that broadcasts illegal sports, pornography, and pre-collapse movies and television shows. He is killed by a Plex secret agent, and his cat Raul gives Flagg the keys to the station. He also leaves behind a video explaining to his "heir" the truth of the Plex and the rules he wishes his successor to follow.
- Amanda "Mandy" Krieger, daughter of Hilton, is the air traffic controller for O'Hare Chicago Plexport. Since the O'Hare Plexport only receives two flights a week, however, Mandy spends her time tinkering with electronics or getting into mischief. She later becomes a deputy to Flagg.
- Jules "Deathwish" Folquet, captain of the Skokie Skullcrushers basketball team. Despite his punk appearance, his hulking size and the extreme nature of the sport he plays, Jules is quite intelligent. He is referred to as the "king of the two finger lobotomy". He first teams with Flagg to resolve a hostage crisis, but later forms the Video Rangers auxiliaries, and then becomes a Ranger deputy. He also later hosts a talk show with Raul called the "Him and It Show". In the second series, he renounces his violent ways, and, through a remarkable series of events, becomes Pope.
- Charles Keenan Blitz, also known as The Honorable C.K. Blitz, a co-founder of the Genetic Warlords along with Hilton Krieger, also ended up getting drafted into the Plexus Rangers, but ended up leaving to become mayor of Chicago. Blitz has his hand in every deal, regardless of how illegal it may be, as he is extremely wealthy and corrupt, and has killed political opponents. As a side venture, he runs the Skokie Skullcrushers blackmarket basketball team. He is usually flanked by his two robot bodyguards, Bert and Ernie, named after "a private joke no one under 40 understands". He has had affairs with Mandy Krieger and with Peggy Krieger, while Hilton was fighting a brushfire war in Carracas, which lead to her being kicked out by Hilton and giving birth to Medea Blitz.
- Medea Blitz is the offspring of C.K. and Peggy. Early in the series, Medea is a wild child and hangs out with Cyril Farid-Khan, gang leader of current Genetic Warlords. She has a secret affair with Hilton Krieger, but after his murder, is considered a suspect and is involved in a traffic accident, which causes her to miscarry Krieger's child. In order to clean up her act, C.K. Blitz has her join the Plexus Rangers to straighten her out. As the series progresses, Medea is shown to become more and more accepting of the Rangers and becomes a decent team player in Flagg's group.
- Sam Luis Obispo, also known as Ned Beaumont and Tom Slick, is a hustler that Reuben meets in Havana while escorting the Skokie Skullcrushers, and later partners with Flagg for most of his time in South America. He has an affair with the wealthy daughter of the Brazilian ambassador, which causes all sorts of problems for Flagg and himself.
- William Windsor-Jones, also known as Bill, is the youngest member of the Witnesses, a gang of octogenarian rebels. He helps Flagg out from time to time, giving him intelligence and technical support. He later has become a newscaster for Q-USA. Bill is Prince William, and the rightful heir to the now-abolished British throne.
- Luther Ironheart is a robotic Plexus Ranger with a head that consisted of a holographic projection. He is assigned to be Reuben Flagg's partner on patrol. While not very bright, he exhibited superhuman strength and agility.

== Collected editions ==
American Flagg's first nine issues were released by First in a series of trade paperbacks, but after the collapse of First they went quickly out of print. Dynamic Forces and Image Comics announced a reprinting of the first twelve issues in both hardcover and paperback editions in 2004, but complications throughout the production process saw publication delayed until July 2008. This edition, entitled Howard Chaykin's American Flagg! Definitive Edition, Vol. 1 (ISBN 1-58240-983-8; signed and numbered, ISBN 1-58240-984-6; Titan Books, ISBN 1-84576-102-2), features the first 14 issues of the original First Comics series, an all-new Flagg! story written and drawn by Chaykin, and a foreword and afterword by Michael Chabon and Jim Lee, respectively. Dynamite Entertainment have also produced a hardcover collecting the prelude and the first twelve issues of American Flagg (ISBN 0-9749638-4-4).

There is also a series of trade paperbacks:

- Volume 1 (American Flagg #1–7, 192 pages, Dynamite Entertainment, November 2008, ISBN 0-9749638-5-2; Titan Books, June 2009, ISBN 1-84576-077-8)
- Volume 2 (American Flagg #8–14, 192 pages, Image Comics, April 2009, ISBN 1-58240-419-4; Titan Books, May 2009, ISBN 1-84576-078-6)
