= Mike Gold (comics) =

American comic book editor (born 1950)

Michael Gold
- Born: August 4, 1950 (age 76) Chicago, Illinois, U.S.
- Areas: Writer, Editor, Publisher
- Notable works: First Comics; DC Comics; ComicMix
- Awards: Dick Giordano Humanitarian of the Year - 2011

Michael Gold (born August 4, 1950) is an American comics writer, editor and publisher, known for his work as the former media coordinator for the defense for the Chicago Conspiracy Trial, Group Editor and Director of Editorial Development at DC Comics, co-founder of First Comics, and the co-founder and director of communication National Runaway Switchboard as well as a disk jockey in Chicago in the 1970s.

== Career ==
Gold entered the comic industry as DC's first public relations manager. His job was to improve DC's interactions with the direct market and comic fans.

Gold launched First Comics in 1983 with a line-up of creators including Frank Brunner, Mike Grell, Howard Chaykin, Joe Staton, Steven Grant, Timothy Truman, and John Ostrander. Among the titles Gold edited were Chaykin's satirical futuristic cop series American Flagg; Ostrander and Truman's GrimJack; Mike Baron and Steve Rude's Nexus; Badger; Jim Starlin's space opera series Dreadstar and Mike Grell's Jon Sable Freelance, which was briefly adapted for TV.

In 1986, Gold left First Comics and returned to DC, where he edited Legends, The Shadow, The Question, Action Comics Weekly, Green Arrow: The Longbow Hunters, Blackhawk, and Hawkworld.

In 2005, Gold revived Jon Sable Freelance and GrimJack for IDW Publishing with new miniseries and reprint collections of the First Comics issues, and would also publish a complete collection of Mars.

In 2006, Gold co-founded ComicMix with Brian Alvey and Glenn Hauman.

In 2011, he received the first Humanitarian Award from the Hero Initiative during the Harvey Awards ceremony at the Baltimore Comic-Con.

Gold has worked with the Organic Theater Company of Chicago and the American Shakespeare Theatre, been involved with numerous political efforts, and a significant contributor to an award-winning Head Start and early childhood education program for the Child Care Center of Stamford. His writings have appeared in a wide range of newspapers and magazines, including The Chicago Tribune, The Realist and MacUser magazine.

Since 2018, Gold has been contributing opinion columns on the Pop Culture Squad website. His topics include comic books analysis, history, and commentary as well as political opinions. In 2023, he began co-hosting the Pop Culture SquadCast - Live podcast that is broadcast on the site's YouTube channel.
