= George Freeman (comics) =

Canadian comic book penciller, inker and colorist

- Born: May 27, 1951 (age 75) Selkirk, Manitoba, Canada
- Areas: Penciller, Inker, Colourist
- Notable works: Captain Canuck

George Freeman (born May 27, 1951 in Selkirk, Manitoba) is a Canadian comic book penciller, inker, and colorist.

== Career ==
Freeman's comic-book illustrating career began with Richard Comely’s independent Canadian publication, Captain Canuck. He subsequently worked on several superhero comics, such as DC Comics' Green Lantern and Aquaman, and Marvel Comics' Jack of Hearts, and The Avengers. Freeman inked Joe Staton's pencils in The Brave and the Bold #197 (April 1983). That story's writer, Alan Brennert, noted in a 2016 interview that the Staton and Freeman art "is spectacular, perfectly melding a Golden Age feel with modern sensibilities." A few years later, Freeman drew a story in Batman Annual #11, written by Alan Moore. In addition, he was one of several rotating artists on the short-lived horror comic anthology Wasteland by writer and actor Del Close and writer John Ostrander. Freeman alternated with artists Don Simpson, William Messner-Loebs, and David Lloyd on drawing one of the three horror stories in each issue, the fourth artist providing the cover. Freeman also illustrated the short comic "Blizzard House," written by Nicholas Burns and published in the Arctic Comics anthology in 2016.

In 1991, Freeman co-founded Digital Chameleon, a Winnipeg-based comics coloring and inking studio.

== Awards ==
Freeman was a 1996 Eisner Awards nominee for Best Colorist for Topps' The X-Files comic.

In 2010, Freeman was inducted into the Canadian Comic Book Creator Hall of Fame.
