= Punisher (1995 series) =

- Cover to Punisher #8 (June 1996).

Publication information
- Publisher: Marvel Edge (Marvel Comics)
- Schedule: Monthly
- Genre: Crime, spy, superhero, war
- Publication date: November 1995 – April 1997
- No. of issues: 18
- Main character(s): Punisher

Creative team
- Written by: John Ostrander
- Penciller(s): Tom Lyle
- Inker(s): Chris Ivy
- Colorist(s): John Kalisz

Punisher (1995 series) is a comic book series starring the fictional Marvel Comics vigilante the Punisher.

== Publication history ==
This series followed The Punisher (1985 limited series) and The Punisher (1987 ongoing series), but without "The" in the title. It is the fourth ongoing series to feature the Punisher after the 1987 series, The Punisher War Journal (1988–1995), and The Punisher War Zone (1992–1995). The series was published by the Marvel Comics imprint Marvel Edge and ran for 18 issues from November 1995 to April 1997, all written by John Ostrander.

== Prints ==
=== Issues ===
1. Condemned
2. Family
3. Hatchet Job
4. Clash
5. Firepower
6. Hostage to the Devil
7. He's Alive!
8. Vengeance is Mine!
9. Tumbling Down
10. Last Shot Fired
11. Onslaught Impact 2 - Manhattan Onslaught
12. Total X-tinction 01
13. Total X-tinction 02
14. Total X-tinction 03
15. Total X-tinction 04
16. Total X-tinction 05
17. Dead Man Walking
18. Double Cross

== Story ==
The series begins with Frank Castle on death row for the murder of Nick Fury, with the mafia staging Castle's electrocution in order to recruit him into their rankings, which he eventually accepts. During this time he goes by his Italian birth name, Castiglione.

Throughout the series, he is later betrayed by the mob boss, and survived numerous attempts on his life. He is also recruited by S.H.I.E.L.D. to provide protection to a pastor who preaches equality for both humans and mutants alike. The series concludes with Castle, now suffering from amnesia, living in an abandoned Catholic Church. He does remember bits of his violent life, and seems to believe he has a mission.

== See also ==
- 1995 in comics
