= Starspawn of Volturnus =

Tabletop science fiction role-playing game adventure

- Cover art by Tim Truman
- Designers: Mark Acres; Tom Moldvay
- Publishers: TSR
- Publication: 1982; 44 years ago
- Genres: Science fiction
- Systems: Percentile

Starspawn of Volturnus is an adventure published by TSR in 1982 for the science fiction role-playing game Star Frontiers.

== Contents ==
In the first module of the "Volturnus Trilogy", SF-0 Crash on Volturnus, the player characters involuntarily arrived on the alien planet Volturnus when their spacecraft crash-landed. At the conclusion of the second module in this series, SF-1 Volturnus, Planet of Mystery, they learned that an invading battle fleet of the mysterious and aggressive aliens called the Sathar would be arriving in two weeks. In this, the final adventure of the trilogy, the humans have only a few days to create an alliance of the four native races of the planet if there is to be any possibility of defeating the Sathar.

== Publication history ==
TSR published the science fiction role-playing game Star Frontiers in 1982, a boxed set that included the game's first adventure, SF-0 Crash on Volturnus. TSR quickly followed this with the release in the same year of two more adventures in the "Volturnus Trilogy", SF-1 Volturnus, Planet of Mystery, and SF-2 Starspawn of Volturnus, a 32-page book with a cardstock outer folder, written by Mark Acres and Tom Moldvay, with interior art by Jim Holloway, and cover art by Tim Truman.

== Reception ==
Jim Bambra reviewed Starspawn of Volturnus for Imagine magazine, and stated that "Good players are rewarded by a cataclysmic conclusion to the Volturnus trilogy and the potential for some very enjoyable roleplaying. A must for Star Frontiers fans."
