= The F-Men =

The F-Men were a pastiche of X-Men who first appeared in E-Man #2 of First Comics in 1982.

== Original F-men story ==
The F-Men were all parodies of Marvel Comics characters who were given superpowers by Ford Fairmont, the blind CEO of Fairview Sunglasses who wished to create the superhero characters in reality. He kidnapped various people around New York City and gave them the powers and personalities of The F-Men. After E-Man and W.I.M.P. (who published the F-Men comics) intervened, everyone was returned to normal.

== Roster ==
- Albatross (Phoenix) a.k.a. Nova Caine of E-Man
- Zitpops (Cyclops)
- Clodhoppus (Colossus)
- Drizzle (Storm)
- Airhead (Kitty Pryde)
- Slimesquirmer (Nightcrawler)
- The Weasel (Wolverine)
