= Digital Chameleon =

Canadian comics studio

- Type: Comics studio (digital production)
- Founded: 1991; 35 years ago
- Founders: Lovern Kindzierski; Chris Chuckry
- Defunct: 2003; 23 years ago
- Headquarters: Winnipeg, Manitoba, Canada, Canada
- Key people: Ed Beddome, Tim Riddoch, Dick Thomas, George Freeman

Digital Chameleon was a comic book coloring, inking, and lettering studio based in Winnipeg, Manitoba, Canada. Working for clients such as DC/Vertigo, Marvel, Defiant, Topps, Dark Horse, Eclipse, First, Image, and Malibu, Digital Chameleon is attributed with being the first studio to make the use of the computer software program Adobe Photoshop widespread in the comics industry. In addition to their work in the comics field, Digital Chameleon also colored animation, CD covers, posters, magazines, and advertisements.

== History ==
Canadians comics artists Lovern Kindzierski and George Freeman had partnered together since c. 1987, doing coloring and other creative work for such publishers as Dark Horse, DC, Eclipse, and First Comics. Kindzierski's cousin Christopher Chuckry joined the team in 1991 and — along with partners Ed Beddome, Tim Riddoch and Dick Thomas — they formed Digital Chameleon, with Chuckry assuming the title of President and Kindzierski becoming Vice President and Creative Director.

Colorists at Digital Chameleon included Kindzierski, Laurie E. Smith, George Freeman, Bernie Mireault, and Carla Feeney. Partner Beddome left the company in 1993, and co-founder Chuckry left the company in 1996. After Chuckry's departure, Kindzierski acted as president. Freeman became art director in c. 1994; after he left, in the period 1997–1998, Igor Kordej took over as the studio's art director.

Jolaine Thomas was named Operations Manager in August 1994; an employee since 1993, in the year she had been at the company, it had expanded from seven employees to 25.

Colorists and inkers employed by Digital Chameleon in 1997 included Hilary Barta, Jordi Ensign, Kindzierski, Gary Martin, Steve Montano, Jimmy Palmiotti, and Tom Simmons.

The company was doing digital lettering in the early 2000s, notably for English translations of manga.

Digital Chameleon closed its doors in 2003.

== Production process ==
In 1997, the company used Macintosh Quadra 800, Macintosh Quadra 950, and Macintosh Quadra 840AV computers, augmented by SuperMac Thunderstorm Pro cards and DayStar Digital cache cards. Coloring and color separations were primarily done in Photoshop, but "painters often turn to other software on special situations. For example, if a more painterly effect is required, such as more specialized brushes, or textures, they go to Fractal Painter. Other software used includes Studio 32, Zeus, Color-it, Illustrator, Freehand and QuarkXPress."

== Awards ==
Digital Chameleon was recognized for its work with Kindzierski/Digital Chameleon being nominated for a 1993 Eisner Award for Best Coloring. (In addition, Kindzierski was nominated for the same award in 1992, 1998, 2001, and 2015.)

Kindzierski won the 1997 Comics Buyer's Guide Fan Awards for Favorite Colorist. Digital Chameleon received nominations for the Comics Buyer's Guide Fan Awards Favorite Colorist Award in 1997 and 1998 (both with Kindzierski), and again in 1999, 2000, 2001, and 2003.

Digital Chameleon received a Harvey Award nomination in 1999 for Best Inker for its "body of work in 1998, including the Hulk/Sub-Mariner Annual (Marve)". The company also received a Harvey Award nomination in 2002 for Best Lettering on (the English translation of) Akira.
