= Grimjack =

Fictional character

- Grimjack #1 by Timothy Truman.

Publication information
- Publisher: First Comics / IDW Publishing
- First appearance: Starslayer #10 (Nov. 1983)
- Created by: John Ostrander; Timothy Truman

In-story information
- Alter ego: John Gaunt / James Twilley
- Notable aliases: Grinner; Chaney
- Abilities: Sensitivity to magic Psychic sensitivity

Grimjack is the main character of a science fiction comic book originally published by the American company First Comics, and later by IDW Publishing. John Ostrander and Timothy Truman are credited as co-creators of the character, although Ostrander had been developing Grimjack with artist Lenin Delsol before Truman's arrival on the project according to Ostrander's own text piece in Grimjack #75. In that same essay, the writer also revealed having initially conceived the character to be the star of a series of prose stories, set in a post-apocalyptic Chicago.

Grimjack is the street name of John Gaunt, a sword-for-hire, ex-paramilitary, war veteran and former child gladiator. He operates from Munden's Bar in the Pit, a slum area of Cynosure, a pan-dimensional city to which all dimensions connect.

== Publication history ==
Grimjack began as a backup feature in issue #10 of the comic book Starslayer. The character of Grimjack was created by John Ostrander and Timothy Truman, but the setting, the pan-dimensional city of Cynosure, predates the character. The Grimjack backup story was very popular with the readers of Starslayer, and First Comics decided to give the character his own title. The Grimjack backup story ran from issue #10 to 17. Grimjack guest-starred in the main Starslayer story in issue #18, in July 1984.

Issue #1 of Grimjack was published by First Comics in August 1984, and ran until issue #81, in April 1991, with all stories written by Ostrander. Artists who worked on the series included Timothy Truman, Sam Grainger, Tom Mandrake, Jim McDermott, Steve Pugh, Tom Sutton, Paul Guinan, Martin Thomas, and Flint Henry. With issue #55, the character of James Twilley, a future incarnation of Gaunt, was introduced as the timeline jumped forward 200 years. Throughout its run, with the exception of a few full-length issues (as well as #60 with its expanded letter column), Grimjack featured a backup story in the manner of other First Comics series. From issue #2 to 69, the backstory was titled Munden's Bar, a telling of events at the eponymous bar. The story brought a small amount of fame to the series for its occasional guest stars, such as the Teenage Mutant Ninja Turtles. Starting with issue #70 a new backup feature began, as John Ostrander felt that Munden's Bar was getting too far away from his original intent and he suspended it for reworking. In its place was his own serial entitled Youngblood, drawn by Steve Pugh. Youngblood told the story of John Gaunt's troubled childhood, via flashbacks from a point in Gaunt's life prior to his first published appearance in Starslayer, but after the "Demon Wars". It concluded in issue #81. Although one of First Comics' most popular titles, after the company declared bankruptcy, it did not make it into print again until 2005.

In 1990, First published Demon Knight, a stand-alone graphic novel featuring the James Twilley incarnation of Grimjack going back in time to the Demon Wars to try to change his fate. Although a stand-alone, the story ties in thematically with the "Demon Wars" flashback storyline taking place in issues #66–69 and Twilley appears in a panel of issue #69.

First's Grimjack Casefiles, a reprint series covering the Starslayer backup stories and the first issues of the Grimjack series, ran a total of 5 issues from November 1990 to March 1991.

Following their recovering the rights to Grimjack, John Ostrander and Timothy Truman teamed up again to publish Grimjack: Killer Instinct, a 6-issue miniseries published by IDW Publishing. The miniseries, since reprinted in graphic novel form, serves as a prequel to the First Comics Grimjack series and shows John Gaunt's life leading up to his first appearance in Starslayer #10. The series met with critical acclaim for its art, storyline and original setting. With a script by John Ostrander and art by Timothy Truman, the series was lettered by John Workman and edited by Mike Gold. All of them had worked on the original Grimjack comic. IDW Publishing also re-issued the First Comics Grimjack run in a series of trade paperbacks under the title The Legend of Grimjack. As of October 2007, 8 collections have been released.

The character was serialized in a new storyline, The Manx Cat, as a Comicmix.com webcomic in January 2011. It has since seen print as a six-issue miniseries through Comicmix's arrangement with IDW Comics. The story involves "The Manx Cat", a statuette of such a cat that at first seems to be a simple MacGuffin like the classic Maltese Falcon of the novel and films by that name, but which begins showing malevolent powers. The plot thickens with time travel, reincarnation, and Elder Gods. Like most modern comics, it features digitally-created art.

== Fictional character biography ==
=== John Gaunt ===
John Gaunt, alias Grimjack, was born in The Pit, a slum area of the pan-dimensional city of Cynosure, where both magic and technology, humans and aliens intermingle. His mother Anya (née Laughton) died in childbirth. John had two older brothers, Nick (nicknamed "Young Nick" and named after their father, "Old Nick") and Jake. His father married Anya's sister, Maite (nicknamed "Mouse") and they had one child together, Joe. Joe was the only of his brothers for whom John cared, and he vowed to Mouse that he would watch out for him. Old Nick had one brother, Jack. Young Nick hated and resented John, blaming him for the death of their mother, the only person who loved him. Throughout John's life, Young Nick manipulated their father into hating John in hopes that he would kill John.

When John was about five years old, Old Nick attacked and killed Jack in a drunken rage. He was sentenced to prison but later escaped. The day he returned home Mouse vanished. It is unknown whether Old Nick killed her. On John's eighth birthday, Old Nick, having decided that Gaunt was actually Jack's son, attacked John with a broken bottle. This caused the distinctive vertical scar that Gaunt carried through his life. Old Nick fell in the fireplace and burned to death.

Following their father's death, the four brothers survived on the streets by stealing. One night they broke into the house of a merchant to rob him. Jake killed the merchant when he discovered them in the house. Nick, Jake and Joe escaped but Nick knocked John unconscious and abandoned him to take the rap for the murder. John was found guilty and sentenced to fight in the Arena of Cynosure. The day he arrived in the Arena he vowed to kill Nick.

Gaunt joined one of the gangs of child warriors called "Wolfpacs". During that time, Gaunt went by the name of "Grinner" and was known as the second-best fighter in the Arena, second only to The Dancer. Gaunt was released from the Arena at age 22 because, while he fought and killed, he refused to make his kills entertaining to the crowd.

Following his release, Gaunt began a search for his brothers. Attacked and badly wounded in a street fight, Gaunt stumbled upon the entrance to the dimension of Pdwyr. There he was nursed back to health and met the love of his life, a woman named Rhian. He studied magic with Rhian's father, Maethe Mathonwy, but while Gaunt could summon power he did not have the inner peace needed to properly control it. Another Cynosure resident, Major Lash, found his way to Pdwyr and informed Gaunt that the city had been invaded by Hell itself. Lash convinced Gaunt to return to Cynosure and fight in the Demon Wars by persuading him that if the city fell the demons would find and destroy Pdwyr. The city's forces were able to repel Hell but demons invaded Pdwyr, causing the destruction of the land and the death of all those Gaunt loved, including Rhian. After burying his dead, Gaunt joined the Major's group of temporal bounty hunters, the Lawkillers, not knowing that it was Major Lash who had betrayed Pdwyr to the demons. Gaunt would not learn the truth for some 25 years.

At age 30, John Gaunt had a final fateful confrontation with his brothers. Nick shot John, leading Joe to draw his gun and shoot Nick. Jake then shot Joe and Joe shot Jake. John shot Nick. Jake shot Joe again, killing him. John then finished Jake. Nick shot John again and John killed Nick.

After leaving the Lawkillers, Gaunt joined the Trans-Dimensional Police, Cynosure's police department. Upon quitting the TDP, he was enlisted as the first member of Cadre, a spy agency of the Cynosure government. After the events detailed in the Grimjack: Killer Instinct storyline, he abandoned Cadre and set himself up as a mercenary and private investigator in Cynosure. At some point he purchased the bar known as Munden's, apparently named after bartender Gordon Munden, from Munden's ex-wife.

=== Grimjack clone ===
During a bloody conflict with the Lawkillers, Gaunt managed to kill two of Major Lash's men, Preacher and Grunt, but turned his back on Lash, disgusted with the senseless bloodshed and murder, including the revelation that the enemy he had killed months ago was his biological son. Lash seized this opportunity and killed Grimjack. Gaunt was shocked to find himself in Heaven, where he was reunited with his former love, Rhian. He was informed that for all his faults, he always stood by his friends, and for that he was judged worthy. But he soon discovers that The Dancer has reanimated Gaunt's corpse in order to murder his friend Blackjacmac. Gaunt was horrified at this, as Blackjacmac would likely go to Hell if he were to die at this point in his life. Forfeiting a peaceful Afterlife, but continuing to act for the benefit of his friends, Gaunt returned to Cynosure by animating a clone body of himself at an age several decades younger than his original body. In this body, Gaunt operated under the alias "Chaney" and had increased psychic sensitivity. Gaunt operated under this identity for several months, gradually re-establishing relationships with his friends, until he met a man claiming to be an incarnation of himself from 3,000 years in the future. This "FutureJack" tells Gaunt that when he left Heaven, he was barred from returning to either Heaven or Hell. Gaunt is condemned to be reborn eternally. "FutureJack" convinces Gaunt that his doom is tied to the fate of Cynosure and to accompany him on a mission to hasten the destruction of the city. During the mission Gaunt realizes that "FutureJack" is lying to him and shoots him. "FutureJack" is apparently destroyed.

=== James Twilley ===
Grimjack was reborn as James Edgar Twilley, the son of a rich Cynosure family. Initially unaware of his past life, Twilley began remembering at around age 14 when he witnessed a thug murdering a jock who bullied him in high school. Twilley murdered the thug and marked himself with the trademark Grimjack scar of his previous life. Twilley went underground, disappearing from his family and friends as he set about re-learning his past skills. When he was ready, Twilley showed up at Munden's and, using a clause written into the ownership contract of the bar, claimed his identity as well as the bar. Sometime later, his family, distraught over the changes that their son had undergone, kidnapped him and forced him into a personality restructuring therapy to erase the troubling memories, but when presented with a copy of John Gaunt as supposed proof that Twilley's memories were false, he flew in a frenzy and ripped out the Gaunt copy's throat with his teeth. Discovering his family's manipulations, James Twilley left his family and assumed once again the street name of Grimjack with Munden's Bar as his base of operations. James Twilley died in issue #81 of Grimjack, concluding First Comics' run.

== Other appearances ==
Grimjack's first published appearance was in a backup story in First's Warp, "The Dogs of War", featuring the character Sargon, Mistress of War. The story opens in Munden's Bar and Gaunt appears in shadow in one panel, although this was not known at the time. Ostrander identified this figure as Gaunt years later. In addition to his own series, Grimjack made appearances in two Munden's Bar specials and a few First Comics crossover specials including The Gift and Crossroads. Away from First, Gaunt's corpse made a one-panel appearance as a sight gag in issue #5 of the DC Comics horror anthology title Wasteland.

In the fourth chapter of his 1986 Amber novel Blood of Amber, Roger Zelazny introduced a character named "Old John", who works as an emissary for the King of Amber. Old John is described as having a "nasty-looking scar running both above and below his left eye" and a "nasty grin", wearing a dark feathered hat. Zelazny, a fan of the Grimjack series since its premiere issue, later contributed the introduction to the Grimjack graphic novel Demon Knight. In the short story "The Shroudling and the Guisel", published posthumously in Amberzine #8, Zelazny refers to Grimjack by name: "I stood among the grave markers of unknown mortals—Dennis Colt, Remo Williams, John Gaunt—and swore to be her champion if ever she needed one". This story was later reprinted in the Zelazny collection Manna from Heaven.

== Legal history ==
Following the bankruptcy of First Comics in 1991, the legal rights to Grimjack became tied up with First Comics' other assets. Ken F. Levin, co-founder of First Comics, and Mike Gold, Grimjack's original editor, set out to free the rights to the character from legal limbo. There were several reports over the years that the problem was not the rights to Grimjack, invariably stated in these accounts to be owned outright by Ostrander, but those to its setting, the pan-dimensional city of Cynosure, which was the property of First Comics. The unique nature of the place was crucial to many of Ostrander's storylines, and some observers even considered it to be a "character" in its own right.

After 12 years of efforts, all rights to Grimjack were released and a new company was founded, NightSky GrimJack Rights and Production Vehicle (Four Wheel Drive Model), LLC, with legal ownership to the character. John Ostrander and Timothy Truman are said to have "substantial equity positions" in the venture.

== In other media ==
J. Michael Straczynski had reportedly planned to write a film adaptation of Grimjack during his time on Babylon 5. He initially planned to produce the script during the summer of 1996, but timing conflicts prevented him from doing it. As a result, the project was put on hold, and has not been resurrected since. According to Straczynski, the film was budgeted for $30 million, and as scriptwriter, Straczynski intended to remain as faithful as possible to the source material.

At San Diego Comic-Con 2019, the Russo brothers announced their production company AGBO were developing a television series adaptation for Amazon. It's being written by Kevin Murphy and the Russo brothers will produce the show.

== Sources ==
- Zelazny, Roger (1986). Blood of Amber. collected in The Great Book of Amber: The Complete Amber Chronicles, 1–10. New York, Avon Books (1999). ISBN 0-380-80906-0.
