= Hawkworld =

Comic book series

Publication information
- Publisher: DC Comics
- Schedule: Monthly
- Format: Mini-series; Ongoing
- Publication date: 1989–1993
- No. of issues: 3 (limited); 32 (ongoing)
- Main character(s): Katar Hol; Shayera Thal; Byth Rok; Paran Katar; Andar Pul

Creative team
- Created by: Tim Truman

Collected editions
- Hawkworld: ISBN 978-1-56389-021-5

Hawkworld is an American comic book series published by DC Comics from 1989 to 1993. The initial storyline was published as a three-issue mini-series and then, based on the high sales and interest level generated by this limited series, launched as an ongoing monthly book. Katar Hol and Shayera Thal were rebooted in the prestige format limited series.

== Publication history ==
The three-issue limited series written and drawn by Timothy Truman and inked by Enrique Alcatena was published in 1989. The ongoing series lasted for four years (1990–1993) and included 32 issues, along with 3 annuals. Timothy Truman contributed to the plotting of the first six issues, which were scripted by John Ostrander. Ostrander was the sole credited writer for the remainder of the series. After the Hawkworld ongoing series ended in 1993, a new series simply named Hawkman (vol. 3) picked up the story line and ran from 1993 to 1996. Ostrander wrote the first six issues of this new series, tying up some dangling plot threads from Hawkworld.

== Plot ==
Katar Hol was a young police officer on the planet Thanagar, and a child of a privileged family. But his homeworld had the policy to conquer and mine other worlds for their resources to maintain its high standard of living, and Katar realized that this was wrong. He rebelled against the system, and was sent into exile. 10 years later, he escaped and got the help of Shayera Thal, a young officer from a lower social class, to uncover and defeat the renegade police captain Byth Rok. As a result, Hol was reinstated in the Wingmen Force and given a new partner, Thal.

== Themes ==
The primary themes Timothy Truman focused on in the limited series were social inequality and class. When John Ostrander took over the writing duties with the monthly series he continued to develop and expand upon Truman's original ideas. After relocating the setting of the series from Thanagar to the city of Chicago, Katar and Shayera were exposed to the founding documents of the United States as part of their education on America's criminal justice system. Neither characters were familiar with the concept of natural rights and found the contrasts between America's founding principles and the reality of pragmatic governance perplexing. Their different ways of coming to terms with these ideas and the possibility of spreading them back to their home world drove the story lines of the series. Katar was inspired by the possibilities he found in this new way of thinking while Shayera initially rejected them as unrealistic and unworkable. During the series both characters eventually concluded that, much like Thanagar, the United States was also a "Hawkworld", a predatory society in which the powerful oppress the weak; despite this, they came to see American society as offering more long-term hope for social justice through its embrace of natural rights, even if these values were only embraced on a rhetorical level by most.

== Continuity ==
Along with its contemporaries The Man of Steel, Batman: Year One, Aquaman Special #1, and Green Lantern: Emerald Dawn, Hawkworld was intended to revise DC Universe continuity for the post-Crisis continuity that explored the origins of the Silver Age Hawkman and Hawkwoman. However, DC editors decided that it was not just an origin story; rather, it was occurring in the present, concurrently with the rest of DC's output (similar to Wonder Woman: Gods and Mortals and The Power of Shazam!). This meant that the Hawks' entire history from the Silver Age onward had to be disregarded, including their memberships in the Justice League (including his brief membership in Justice League International). This began a series of retcons to the Hawkman characters that ended with a new Hawkman returning in the pages of JSA.

During the Brightest Day storyline (2010), there is a tribe of creatures that resemble Lion-Mane living on Hawkworld.
