= Timothy Truman =

American writer, artist and musician (born 1956)

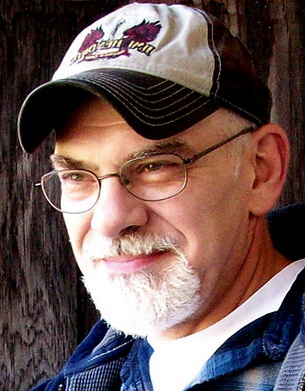
- Truman in 2017
- Born: February 9, 1956 (age 70) Gauley Bridge, West Virginia, United States
- Areas: Penciller, inker, writer
- Notable works: Grimjack; Scout; Jonah Hex; Turok
- Awards: Haxtur Award 1991

Timothy Truman (born February 9, 1956) is an American writer, artist and musician. He is best known for his stories and Wild West-style comic book art, and in particular, for his work on Grimjack (with John Ostrander), Scout, and the reinvention of Jonah Hex, with Joe R. Lansdale.

== Biography ==
Truman was born in 1956 in Gauley Bridge, West Virginia. After graduating from Gauley Bridge High School in 1974, he attended the Columbus College of Art and Design while also attending West Virginia University. From 1979 to 1981 he attended The Kubert School in New Jersey.

He currently lives in Lancaster, Pennsylvania, and was an instructor at the Pennsylvania College of Art and Design from 2003 to 2006.

=== Roleplaying games ===
After graduation, he moved to New York City and worked in the fantasy role-playing game industry for a few years providing illustrations for various companies, including working for TSR, Inc. as a staff illustrator.

Along with Flint Henry, Truman co-authored Rifts Dimension Book 1: Wormwood (1993), which author Shannon Appelcline states was "critically acclaimed for the vibrant backgrounds".

In 2015, Truman contributed, among other artists, to bring inner illustrations to the tabletop role-playing game Conan: Adventures in an Age Undreamed Of, first published in 2016 by British company Modiphius Entertainment.

=== Comics ===
Truman's first professional comics work was a series of backup stories in DC Comics' Sgt. Rock title published from 1981 to 1983. His first major work was Grimjack with writer John Ostrander, for the independent comics company First Comics. Grimjack first appeared in Starslayer #10 (November 1983), before moving to his own series after issue #18 (July 1984), and continued for 81 issues.

In 1985, he created Scout, which was followed by Scout: War Shaman, a futuristic western. A year later, he relaunched the Hillman characters Airboy and The Heap for Eclipse Comics. He also developed The Prowler, a Shadow type character, and adapted The Spider for Eclipse.

At DC Comics he created Hawkworld, a reinvention of Hawkman in 1989. An ongoing series with the same name was launched the following year. With author Joe R. Lansdale, he reinterpreted Jonah Hex as a horror western. In it, their creation of villain Edgar Autumn elicited a lawsuit from musician Edgar Winter.

Truman was chosen by Dark Horse Comics to illustrate a newly completed Tarzan novel and wrote a story arc for the comic book. He also wrote nearly the entire run of Turok: Dinosaur Hunter for Valiant Comics. For the defunct science fiction imprint of DC, Helix, he created The Black Lamb. He also worked on a typical pulp adventure Guns of the Dragon, featuring Enemy Ace and Bat Lash and scripted a Creature Commandos limited series. At Dark Horse Comics, he wrote Star Wars, Conan, and Conan The Cimmerian.

=== New projects ===
In 2018 Truman launched a successful Kickstarter campaign, Scout Marauder, to expand on the storyline of his character Scout. The promotion was a success, raising over $44,000.00 from supporters. The campaign was projected to be completed in February 2019. As of July 2024, the project is still in production.

=== West Virginia ===
Truman's work, Wilderness: The True Story of Simon Girty, Renegade was a two-volume black and white graphic novel depicting the American settler's western frontier.

Tecumseh! a graphic novel based on the Chillicothe Ohio Outdoor Theater Production is a colored graphic novel that shows the play from beginning to end. It renewed interest in the warrior in Appalachia.

=== Music ===
A longtime fan and musician, Truman has integrated his love of music into comics and illustration. While working for Eclipse Comics, Truman included a flexi disc recording inside Scout #19 (May 1987) that provided a soundtrack to one of the scenes in the comic. He also released an album through Eclipse Records with his band The Dixie Pistols entitled Marauder. The album included a short comic book featuring the wedding of Emanuel Santanna that took place between the first series Scout and the second series Scout: War Shaman.

While writing the biography of one of his favorite guitarists, Carlos Santana, for Rock-It Comics, Truman found out that the musician had been a longtime fan of his comic, Scout, whose main character, Emanuel Santanna, is the namesake of the famous guitarist. Naming the characters after favorite musicians was a common convention that Truman used throughout the Scout series.

Truman has also had a long relationship with the band the Grateful Dead creating artwork for CD covers, tour posters, limited-edition T-shirts and a color comics page in each issue of the Grateful Dead Almanac.

Truman built a recording studio in his home and while producing recording sessions for Cherokee singer/songwriter Terry Strongheart, they decided to form a new band with some of Truman's friends and Strongheart's daughter called the Terry Strongheart Band. Two CDs have been recorded, the first entitled Tears and the follow-up Indian School.

Truman provided illustrations for the posthumous Rory Gallagher release Kickback City (2013). Truman said he first heard Gallagher's music in 1973 while a junior in high school.

Timothy Truman is often confused with the music composer Tim Truman who wrote the theme to Melrose Place and composed the score to Miami Vice's final season among other important contributions to the music industry in movies and television.

== Bibliography ==
=== Avatar Press ===
- On the Far Side of the Cadillac Desert with Dead Folks (a, three-issue limited series with Joe R. Lansdale, March–June 2003, collected in Joe R. Lansdale and Timothy Truman's on the Far Side with Dead Folks, tpb, 72 pages, 2004, ISBN 1-59291-021-1)

=== Bantam Spectra ===
- The Ray Bradbury Chronicles: Volume 3 (anthology, w/a, "The Veldt", tpb, 77 pages, November 1992, ISBN 0-553-35127-3)

=== Dark Horse Comics ===
- Dark Horse Presents #47, "Jungle of the Giants!" (w/a, with Benjamin Truman, January 1991)
- Star Wars: Episode I Anakin Skywalker, one-shot (w, with Steve Crespo, May 1999) collected in Star Wars Episode I: Adventures (tpb, 112 pages, 2000, ISBN 1-56971-443-6)
- Star Wars (June 1999–June 2001) (w)
  - Outlander (tpb, 144 pages, 2001, ISBN 1-56971-514-9) collects:
    - "Outlander" (with Tom Raney, Rob Pereira, Rick Leonardi and Al Rio, in #7–12, 1999)
  - Emissaries to Malastare (tpb, 144 pages, 2001, ISBN 1-56971-545-9) collects:
    - "Emissaries to Malastare" (with Tom Lyle, Jan Duursema and John Nadeau, in #13–18, 1999–2000)
  - The Hunt for Aurra Sing (tpb, 96 pages, 2002, ISBN 1-56971-651-X) collects:
    - "The Hunt for Aurra Sing" (with Davidé Fabbri, in #28–31, 2001)
- Star Wars: The Bounty Hunters - Aurra Sing, one-shot (w/a, August 1999) collected in Star Wars: Bounty Hunters (tpb, 112 pages, 2000, ISBN 1-56971-467-3)
- Conan (March 2006–May 2008)
  - The Blood-Stained Crown and Other Stories (tpb, 144 pages, 2008, ISBN 1-59307-886-2) collects:
    - "Seeds of Empire" (a, with Kurt Busiek, in #26, 2006)
    - "The Blood-Stained Crown" (a, with Kurt Busiek, in #27, 2006)
  - The Hall of the Dead and Other Stories (tpb, 200 pages, 2007, ISBN 1-59307-775-0) collects:
    - "Dogs of the Hills" (w, with Cary Nord, in #33, 2006)
    - "The Sons of Bel" (w, with Cary Nord, in #34, 2006)
  - The Spear and Other stories (tpb, 120 pages, 2010, ISBN 1-59582-523-1) collects:
    - "Conan: The Spear" (w, with Paul Lee, in Star Wars/Conan FCBD 2006, 2006)
    - "They Shall Be Lords Again" (w, with Paul Lee, in #35, 2006)
    - "Silent to the Sea" (w, with Paul Lee, in #36, 2007)
    - "Two Wizards and a Funeral" (w, with Paul Lee, in #40, 2007)
    - "The Sorrow of Akivasha" (w, with Paul Lee, in Conan the Cimmerian #14, 2009)
  - Rogues in the House and other stories (hc, 160 pages, 2008, ISBN 1-59307-941-9) collects:
    - "Rogues in the House Part 1: Rogues at the Door" (w, with Cary Nord, in #41, 2007)
    - "Rogues in the House Part 2: Red House, Red Priest" (w, with Cary Nord, in #42, 2007)
    - "Rogues in the House Part 3: The Pits of Refuge" (w, with Tomás Giorello, in #43, 2007)
    - "Rogues in the House Part 4: Man vs. Beast" (w, with Cary Nord, in #44, 2007)
  - The Hand of Nergal (hc, 152 pages, 2008, ISBN 1-59582-179-1) collects:
    - "The Spawn of Nergal" (w, with Tomás Giorello, in #47, 2007)
    - "Darkness Over Yaralet" (w, with Tomás Giorello, in #48, 2008)
    - "Flesh for the Gods of the Night" (w, with Tomás Giorello, in #49, 2008)
    - "The Hand of Nergal" (w, with Tomás Giorello, in #50, 2008)
- Age of Conan: Hyborian Adventures, one-shot, "The Road of Kings" (w, with Cary Nord, July 2006) collected in Conan and the Midnight God (tpb, 136 pages, 2007, ISBN 1-59307-852-8)
- Conan and the Songs of the Dead (limited series) (July 2006–November 2006) (a)
  - Conan and the Songs of the Dead (tpb, 136 pages, 2007, ISBN 1-59307-718-1) collects:
    - "The Root of all Evil" (with Joe R. Lansdale, in #1, 2006)
    - "The Ring of Fire" (with Joe R. Lansdale, in #2, 2006)
    - "The Eye of the Demon" (with Joe R. Lansdale, in #3, 2006)
    - "Lair of the Worm" (with Joe R. Lansdale, in #4, 2006)
    - "Dark Gods" (with Joe R. Lansdale, in #5, 2006)
- MySpace Dark Horse Presents #11, "Conan: Trophy" (w, with Benjamin Truman and Marian Churchland, June 2008) collected in Conan and the Daughters of Midora and other stories (tpb, 128 pages, 2012, ISBN 1-59582-917-2)
- Conan the Cimmerian (June 2008–November 2010) (w)
  - Cimmeria (hc, 216 pages, 2009, ISBN 1-59582-283-6) collects:
    - "Cimmeria" (with Tomás Giorello, in #0, 2008)
    - "Hunter's Moon" (with Tomás Giorello and Richard Corben, in #1, 2008)
    - "Mark of the Wolf" (with Tomás Giorello and Richard Corben, in #2, 2008)
    - "Path of Mist" (with Tomás Giorello and Richard Corben, in #3, 2008)
    - "The Skrae" (with Tomás Giorello and Richard Corben, in #4, 2008)
    - "The Wolf's Promise" (with Tomás Giorello and Richard Corben, in #5, 2008)
    - "Homecoming" (with Tomás Giorello and Richard Corben, in #6, 2008)
    - "Darkness and the Night" (with Tomás Giorello and Richard Corben, in #7, 2009)
  - Black Colossus (hc, 117 pages, 2010, ISBN 1-59582-507-X) collects:
    - "The Scorpion" (with Tomás Giorello, in #8, 2009)
    - "The Mercenary" (with Tomás Giorello, in #9, 2009)
    - "The Commander" (with Tomás Giorello, in #10, 2009)
    - "The Face on the Coin" (with Tomás Giorello, in #11, 2009)
    - "The Battle of Shamla Pass" (with Tomás Giorello, in #12, 2009)
    - "Black Altar" (with Tomás Giorello, in #13, 2009)
  - Free Companions (hc, 184 pages, 2010, ISBN 1-59582-623-8) collects:
    - "Home For the Hunt" (with Joe Kubert, in #14, 2009)
    - "Free Companions" (with Tomás Giorello, in #16–18, 2009–2010)
    - "Kozaki" (with Tomás Giorello, in #19–21, 2010)
  - Iron Shadows in the Moon and Other Stories (hc, 144 pages, 2011, ISBN 1-59582-712-9) collects:
    - "Iron Shadows in the Moon" (with Tomás Giorello and Paul Lee, in #22–25)
- King Conan: The Scarlet Citadel (w, four-issue limited series with Tomás Giorello, February–May 2011, collected in King Conan: The Scarlet Citadel, tpb, 112 pages, 2012, ISBN 1-59582-838-9)
- King Conan: The Phoenix on the Sword (w, four-issue limited series with Tomás Giorello, January–April 2012, collected in King Conan: The Phoenix on the Sword, tpb, 112 pages, 2013, ISBN 1-61655-029-5)
- King Conan: Hour of the Dragon (W, six-issue limited series with Tomás Giorello, May–October 2013, collected in King Conan: Hour of the Dragon, tpb, 160 pages, 2014, ISBN 1-61655-307-3)
- King Conan: The Conqueror (W, six-issue limited series with Tomás Giorello, February–July 2014, collected in King Conan: The Conqueror, tpb, 160 pages, 2015, ISBN 1-61655-514-9)

=== DC Comics ===
- Sgt. Rock (July 1981–May 1983) (a)
  - "To the Last Man" (in #354, July 1981)
  - "Deep Prey" (in #358, November 1981)
  - "The Pass" (in #361, February 1982)
  - "Deadly Victory" (in #363, April 1982)
  - "Samurai" (in #371, December 1982)
  - "...War Spoils" (in #376, May 1983)
- Wasteland #10, "Mother!" (a, with John Ostrander, September 1988)
- Detective Comics #598, "Tribute: People of Note Pay Homage to Batman" (a, with among other artists, March 1989)
- Secret Origins vol. 2 #43, "Adventures Inside Earth" (a, with Bob Wayne, August 1989)
- Hawkworld (June 1989–August 1989) (w/a)
  - Hawkworld (tpb, 152 pages, 2014, ISBN 1-4012-4329-0) collects:
    - "Flashzone" (in #1, 1989)
    - "Freefall" (in #2, 1989)
    - "Phoenix Flight" (in #3, 1989)
- Hawkworld vol. 2 (June 1990–March 1993)
  - "Predators" (w, with John Ostrander and Graham Nolan, in #1, 1990)
  - "Enter... Hawkman!" (w, with John Ostrander and Graham Nolan, in #2, 1990)
  - "Winged Fury" (w, with John Ostrander and Graham Nolan, in #3, 1990)
  - "Partners" (w, with John Ostrander and Graham Nolan, in #4, 1990)
  - "War of the Shadows" (w, with John Ostrander and Graham Nolan, in #5, 1990)
  - "Strange Worlds" (w, with John Ostrander and Graham Nolan, in #6, 1990)
  - "Birds of Prey" (w, with John Ostrander and Graham Nolan, in #7, 1990)
  - "Talons" (w, with John Ostrander and Graham Nolan, in #8, 1990)
  - "Hawkwoman Caged!" (w, with John Ostrander and Graham Nolan, in #9, 1991)
  - "Flight's End" (a, with John Ostrander, in #30–32, 1992–1993)
- Sgt. Rock Special, one-shot (w/a, October 1992)
- The Kents (August 1997–March 1998) (a)
  - The Kents (tpb, 272 pages, 2000, ISBN 1-56389-513-7) collects:
    - "Bleeding Kansas" (with John Ostrander, in #1–4, 1997)
    - "Brother Versus Brother" (with John Ostrander, in #5–8, 1997–1998)
- Guns of the Dragon (w/a, four-issue limited series, August–November 2000)
- Creature Commandos (March 2000–October 2000) (w)
  - "A Spear of Silence" (with Scot Eaton, in #1, 2000)
  - "From Here to Heaven is a Scar" (with Scot Eaton, in #2, 2000)
  - "Dead Center: Deep as Death" (with Scot Eaton, in #3, 2000)
  - "Hide Witch Hide" (with Scot Eaton, in #4, 2000)
  - "When the Earth Moves Again" (with Scot Eaton, in #5, 2000)
  - "The Last Wall of the Castle" (with Scot Eaton, in #6, 2000)
  - "The Other Side of This Life" (with Scot Eaton, in #7, 2000)
  - "War Movie" (with Scot Eaton, in #8, 2000)
- Martian Manhunter vol. 2 #21, "Revelations Part 2: Beware My Power!" (a, with John Ostrander, June 2000)
- Green Lantern Annual vol. 3 #9, "Mother of Heaven" (w, with Coy Turnbull, 2000) "The Lady of Battle" (w, with Paul Ryan, 2000)
- JLA: Gatekeeper #1–3 (w/a, October 2001–December 2001)
- Convergence: Hawkman (limited series) (April 2015–May 2015) (a)
  - Convergence: Crisis Book 1 (tpb, 272 pages, 2015, ISBN 1-4012-5808-5) collects:
    - "Revelations" (with Jeff Parker, in #1, 2015)
    - "Revelations II" (with Jeff Parker, in #2, 2015)

==== Helix ====
- The Black Lamb (w/a, six-issue limited series, September 1996–February 1997)

==== Vertigo ====
- Jonah Hex: Two-Gun Mojo (June 1993–October 1993) (a)
  - Jonah Hex: Shadows West (tpb, 392 pages, 2014, ISBN 1-4012-4715-6) collects:
    - "Slow Go Smith" (with Joe R. Lansdale, in #1, 1993)
    - "Invitation to a Hanging" (with Joe R. Lansdale, in #2, 1993)
    - "The Resurrectionist" (with Joe R. Lansdale, in #3, 1993)
    - "Vendetta Times Two" (with Joe R. Lansdale, in #4, 1993)
    - "Showdown" (with Joe R. Lansdale, in #5, 1993)
- Jonah Hex: Riders of the Worm and Such (limited series) (January 1995–May 1995) (a)
  - Jonah Hex: Shadows West (tpb, 392 pages, 2014, ISBN 1-4012-4715-6) collects:
    - "No Rest for the Wicked and the Good Don't Need Any" (with Joe R. Lansdale, in #1, 1995)
    - "Wilde's West" (with Joe R. Lansdale, in #2, 1995)
    - "Big Worm" (with Joe R. Lansdale, in #4, 1995)
    - "Autumns of our Discontent" (with Joe R. Lansdale, in #5, 1995)
    - "Cataclysm in Worm Town" (with Joe R. Lansdale, in #6, 1995)
- Dog Moon (a, graphic novel with Robert Hunter, April 1996, tpb, 64 pages, ISBN 1-56389-237-5)
- Jonah Hex: Shadows West (limited series) (December 1998–February 1999) (a)
  - Jonah Hex: Shadows West (tpb, 392 pages, 2014, ISBN 1-4012-4715-6) collects:
    - "Long Tom" (with Joe R. Lansdale, in #1, 1998)
    - "Gathering Shadows" (with Joe R. Lansdale, in #2-3, 1999)
- Flinch #13, "Brer Hoodoo" (a, with Joe R. Lansdale, May 2000)
- Scalped #50 (a, with among other artists, June 2011) collected in Volume 9: Knuckle Up (tpb, 144 pages, 2012, ISBN 1-4012-3505-0)

=== Eclipse Comics ===
- Scout (September 1985–October 1987) (w/a)
  - Volume 1 (tpb, 136 pages, 2006, ISBN 1-933305-95-9) collects:
    - "Untitled" (in #1, 1985)
    - "Little Red Rooster" (in #2, 1985)
    - "Machine Gun" (in #3, 1986)
    - "I Ain't Superstitious" (in #4, 1986)
    - "Killin' Floor!" (in #5, 1986)
    - "House Burning Down!!" (in #6, 1986)
  - Volume 2 (tpb, 192 pages, 2008, ISBN 1-933305-60-6) collects:
    - "Bring It On Home" (only writer, with Tom Yeates, in #7, 1986)
    - "Hellhound on my Trail" (in #8, 1986)
    - "Bad to the Bone" (in #9–10, 1986)
    - "Come Back Baby" (in #11, 1986)
    - "Monday the Eliminator" (only writer, with Flint Henry, in #11–14, 1986)
    - "Me and the Devil" (in #12, 1986)
    - "If I Had Possession Over Judgement Day" (in #13, 1986)
    - "Nobody Loves Me But My Mother (and She Could Be Jivin' Me, Too)" (in #14, 1986)
    - "Uncle Sam Blues" (only writer, with Rick Veitch, in #15, 1986)
    - "Mean Red Spider" (only writer, with Ben Dunn, in #15, 1987)
  - "Stormy Monday" (with Flint Henry, in #16, 1987)
  - "Key to the Highway" (in #17, 1987)
  - "She's A Hum-Dum-Dinger From Dingersville" (only writer, with John K. Snyder III, in #17, 1987)
  - "Blues Hit Big Town" (in #18, 1987)
  - "If I Don't Be There By Morning" (only writer, with Flint Henry, in #18–19, 1987)
  - "Houserockers" (in #19, 1987)
  - "Black Cat Bone" (in #20, 1987)
  - "Poison in my Coffee" (only writer, with Bill Jaaska, in #20, 1987)
  - "I'm on Fire" (in #21, 1987)
  - "I Cross My Heart" (only writer, with Flint Henry, in #21, 1987)
  - "The Wolf is at Your Door!" (only writer, with Ben Dunn, in #22, 1987)
  - "Sittin' on Top of the World" (in #23–24, 1987)
  - "Pie in the Sky A Prologue" (only writer, with Flint Henry, in #23, 1987)
- Alien Encounters #4, "Invasion!", #11, "Old Soldiers Fade Away" (w/a, December 1985–February 1987)
- Airboy (July–December 1986) (w)
  - Airboy Archives Volume 1 (tpb, 308 pages, 2014, ISBN 1-61377-900-3) collects:
    - "On Wings of Death: Phoenix" (also artist, with Chuck Dixon, in #1, 1986)
    - "The Wolf and the Phoenix" (also artist, with Chuck Dixon, in #2, 1986)
    - "Misery Loves Company" (with Chuck Dixon and Stan Woch, in #3, 1986)
    - "Assault on Villa Miserio" (with Chuck Dixon and Stan Woch, in #4, 1986)
    - "I Am Birdie" (with Ben Dunn, in #11, 1986)
- The Prowler (limited series) (July 1987–October 1987) (w)
  - Leo Kragg: Prowler (tpb, 180 pages, 2013, ISBN 1-4793-8388-0) collects:
    - "Blood and Magic" (with John K. Snyder III, in #1, 1987)
    - "Blood and Evil" (with John K. Snyder III, in #2, 1987)
    - "The Official Account" (with Michael Price and Graham Nolan, in #2–3, 1987)
    - "Blood and Darkness" (with John K. Snyder III, in #3, 1987)
    - "Blood and Sacrifice" (with John K. Snyder III, in #4, 1987)
    - "Emulation of Life" (with Michael Price and Graham Nolan, in #4, 1987)
- Revenge of the Prowler (limited series) (February 1988–May 1988) (w)
  - Leo Kragg: Prowler (tpb, 180 pages, 2013, ISBN 1-4793-8388-0) collects:
    - "Slow Burn" (with John K. Snyder III, in #1, 1988)
    - "Search and Destroy" (with John K. Snyder III, in #2, 1988)
    - "If I Should Die... Before I Wake" (with John K. Snyder III, in #3–4, 1988)
- Airboy Meets the Prowler, one-shot, "Confidential Inquirer" (w, with Chuck Dixon, Michael Price, John K. Snyder III and Graham Nolan, December 1987) collected in Airboy Archives Volume 3 (tpb, 308 pages, 2015, ISBN 1-63140-216-1)
- Dragon Chiang (w/a, graphic novel, tpb, 1991, 44 pages, ISBN 1-56060-117-5)
- Tehcumseh! An Illustrated Adaptation (1991)
- Allan W. Eckert's Tecumseh! (w/a, graphic novel, October 1992, tpb, 68 pages, ISBN 1-56060-157-4)

=== First Comics ===
- Grimjack (August 1984–July 1986) (a)
  - Grimjack Omnibus: Volumen 1 (tpb, 400 pages, 2010, ISBN 1-60010-601-3) collects:
    - "A Shade of Truth" (with John Ostrander, in #1, 1984)
    - "Blood Sport" (with John Ostrander, in #2, 1984)
    - "Blood Relations" (with John Ostrander, in #3, 1984)
    - "Legacy" (with John Ostrander, in #4, 1984)
    - "Dead End" (with John Ostrander, in #5, 1984)
    - "Family and Friends" (only writer, with Joe Staton, in #5, 1984)
    - "Shadow Cops" (with John Ostrander, in #6, 1985)
    - "Shadows of Doubt" (with John Ostrander, in #7, 1985)
    - "Exit Poll" (with John Ostrander, in #8, 1985)
    - "My Sins Remembered" (with John Ostrander, in #9, 1985)
    - "Hard-Timers" (with John Ostrander, in #10, 1985)
    - "Long Gone Dead" (with John Ostrander, in #11, 1985)
    - "Charnel House" (with John Ostrander, in #12, 1985)
    - "Suspect" (with John Ostrander, in #13, 1985)
  - Grimjack Omnibus: Volumen 2 (tpb, 368 pages, 2011, ISBN 1-61377-000-6) collects:
    - "Decaying Orbit" (with John Ostrander, in #14, 1985)
    - "The Bargain" (only writer, with John Totleben, in #14, 1984)
    - "This Wheel's on Fire" (with John Ostrander, in #15, 1985)
    - "Wolfpac" (with John Ostrander, in #16–17, 1985)
    - "Trade Wars: Inferno" (with John Ostrander, in #18, 1986)
    - "Trade Wars: Maelstrom" (with John Ostrander and Steve Erwin, in #19, 1986)
    - "Mortal Gods" (with John Ostrander, in #24, 1986)
    - "You Say it's Your Birthday" (with John Ostrander, in #24, 1986)
- Time Beavers (First Comics graphic novel, May 1985)
- Starslayer (#14-19 - full interior art, #20–25 - page layouts only, March 1984 to February 1985)

=== IDW Publishing ===
- GrimJack: Killer Instinct (a, six-issue limited series with John Ostrander, January–June 2005, collected in GrimJack: Killer Instinct, tpb, 144 pages, 2005, ISBN 1-933239-15-8)
- GrimJack: The Manx Cat (a, six-issue limited series with John Ostrander, August 2009–January 2010, collected in Grimjack: The Manx Cat, tpb, 160 pages, 2010, ISBN 1-60010-625-0)
- Hawken (w/a, six-issue limited series with Benjamin Truman, November 2011–September 2012, collected in A Man Named Hawken, tpb, 104 pages, 2012, ISBN 1-61377-409-5)

=== Innovation Publishing ===
- Newstralia #1–2 (w/a, with Stephen Sullivan, Kevin VanHook, July–October 1989)

=== Marvel Comics ===
- Ka-Zar: The Guns of the Savage Land (w, graphic novel, with Chuck Dixon and Gary Kwapisz, tpb, 64 pages, June 1990, ISBN 0-87135-641-4)
- Marvel Comics Presents #93–98, "Wild Frontier" (w, with Todd Foxx, November 1991–January 1992)
- Skaar: Son of Hulk Presents: Savage World of Sakaar, one-shot (a, with Greg Pak, Carlo Pagulayan, Timothy Green II and Gabriel Hardman, September 2008) collected in Skaar: Son of Hulk vol. 1 (tpb, 200 pages, 2009, ISBN 0-7851-2714-3)
- Thor Annual vol. 4 #1, "King Thor" (a, with Jason Aaron, February 2015) collected in Volume 2: Who Holds the Hammer? (hc, 136 pages, 2015, ISBN 0-7851-9784-2)

==== Epic Comics ====
- Wild Cards #3, "Welcome to the Club" (a, with among other artists, September 1990)

=== Topps Comics ===
- The Lone Ranger and Tonto (a, four-issue limited series, with Joe R. Lansdale, August–November 1994, collected in The Lone Ranger and Tonto, tpb, 1995, ISBN 1-883313-05-8)

=== Valiant Comics ===
- Turok: Dinosaur Hunter (October 1993–August 1996) (w)
  - "Shades of Yesterday" (with Rags Morales, in #4–6, 1993)
  - "New River" (also artist, in #7–9, 1994)
  - "Captain Red" (also artist, with Bill Dunn and Howard Simpson, in #13–15, 1994)
  - "Nest of Snakes" (with Rags Morales, in #20, 1995)
  - "Mystery Hole" (with Howard Simpson, in #21, 1995)
  - "Rampage on New River" (with Cory Adams, in #22, 1995)
  - "Mystery Wheel" (with Mike Grell, in #23, 1995)
  - "The Prodigal" (with Rags Morales, in #24–27, 1995)
  - "Radio Men of Lost Land!" (with Paul Gulacy, in #31–33, 1995)
  - "Tree of Life, Land of Shadows" (with Aaron Lopresti, in #36, 1995)
  - "Island of Nazi Women" (with Rags Morales, in #37–38, 1996)
  - "Outlaws of Lost Land" (with Paul Gulacy, in #39–40, 1996)
  - "Bred Up in Darkness" (with Jackson Guice, in #45–46, 1996)
  - "Runaway" (with Rags Morales, #47, 1996)

=== TSR ===
- Starspawn of Volturnus, cover, 1982

== Awards ==
- Hawkworld – DC Comics – Spanish Haxtur Award ("Premios Haxtur") for "Best Long Story" 1991
