= First Comics =

Defunct American comic book publishing company

- Industry: Comics
- Founded: 1983; 2011 (relaunched)
- Founder: Ken F. Levin; Mike Gold
- Defunct: 1991
- Headquarters: Evanston, Illinois (1983–1985); Chicago, Illinois (1985–1991)
- Key people: Matt and John Yuan (deputy publishers); Alex Wald (art director); Kurt Goldzung (sales manager); Larry Doyle (editor); Bob Garcia

First Comics is an American comic book publisher that was active from 1983 to 1991 and then from 2011 to present (stylized as 1First Comics), known for titles like American Flagg!, Grimjack, Nexus, Badger, Dreadstar, and Jon Sable. Along with competitors like Pacific Comics and Eclipse Comics, First took early advantage of the growing direct market, attracting a number of writers and artists from DC and Marvel to produce creator-owned titles, which, as they were not subject to the Comics Code, were free to feature more mature content.

== History ==
Based in Evanston, Illinois, First Comics was co-founded by Ken F. Levin and Mike Gold. It launched in 1983 with a line-up of creators including Frank Brunner, Mike Grell, Howard Chaykin, Joe Staton, Steven Grant, Timothy Truman, and Jim Starlin. In 1984, First acquired all the titles of the short-lived publisher Capital Comics, including Mike Baron's action/superhero/fantasy/comedy series Badger, and Baron and Steve Rude's space-superhero series Nexus.

Among First's best-known titles were Chaykin's satirical futuristic cop series American Flagg; John Ostrander and Tim Truman's Grimjack; Baron & Rude's Nexus; Badger; Jim Starlin's space opera series Dreadstar; and Mike Grell's Jon Sable, which was briefly adapted for TV.

In 1984, the publisher sued industry giant Marvel Comics, claiming that Marvel flooded the market with new titles in 1983 in order to shut out First and other new companies. In the same lawsuit, First also sued printer World Color Press for anti-competitive activities, claiming the printer undercharged Marvel for its business, and in return overcharged First and its fellow independents. The suit was resolved in the spring of 1988.

The company moved to Chicago in 1985. Mike Gold, one of First's founders, served as the company president until late 1985; Gold soon moved to New York to become a senior editor at DC Comics. Gold later used his First Comics connections to bring Grell, Chaykin, and Truman over to DC, where they created series such as Green Arrow: The Longbow Hunters, Blackhawk, and Hawkworld.

From 1985 to 1988, First published Peter B. Gillis and Mike Saenz's digital comic Shatter, the first commercially published all-digital comic book.

In 1986, despite its success with the direct market, First experimented with newsstand distribution. Later that same year, the publisher found itself in the middle of the industry-wide debate about creators' rights. Clashes with DC Comics, First, and other publishers on this issue led in part to the drafting of the Creator's Bill of Rights signed by Scott McCloud, Kevin Eastman, Peter Laird, Dave Sim, Rick Veitch, and other comics creators in late 1988.

First also published a series of comic adaptations of the Eternal Champion books by Michael Moorcock and English translations of the Japanese manga series Lone Wolf and Cub.

The company's final major project was a revival of Classics Illustrated. The company partnered with Berkley Books (then Berkley Publishing Group) to acquire the rights, and Classics Illustrated returned with new adaptations and a line-up of artists that included Kyle Baker, Dean Motter, Mike Ploog, P. Craig Russell, Bill Sienkiewicz, Joe Staton, Rick Geary, and Gahan Wilson. However, the line lasted only a little over a year.

First Comics ceased publishing in 1991, and closed their doors for good in early 1992.

=== Rebirth ===
At San Diego Comic-Con in 2011, First co-founder Levin announced that the company would resume publishing new material in late 2011. Two years later, Mike Baron announced a new project on his Facebook page: "HOWL! coming next year from First Comics. Shane Oakley is the artist". Publishing resumed in June 2014.

First Comics and Devil's Due Publishing merged to form Devil's Due/1First Comics LLC in June 2015. In addition to reprinting older properties, Devil's Due/1First Comics launched five new ongoing series. Despite the merge and emphasis on creator owned properties, both 1First Comics and Devil's Due intend to maintain editorial independence.

First Comics and Devil's Due parted ways and by September of 2019, First Comics was publishing titles under their own banner.

Since 2019, First Comics has continued publishing creator-owned titles, including Inspector Oh and Love Town by Matt and John Yuan, Night Stalker by Orlando Harding, and the Dogwitch Omnibus by Dan Schaeffer.

In December of 2020, First Comics launched its board game division, First Games (aka 1First Games) with a board game adaptation of the Garth Ennis and Darick Robertson series The Boys.

In February of 2022, Matt and John Yuan were named Deputy Publishers.

== Awards ==
The company picked up many industry awards, including a 1985 Kirby Award for Best Graphic Album for Beowulf.

== Legacy/collected editions ==
Dark Horse Comics would later reprint the Lone Wolf and Cub series in English, and finally complete it in 2002. In 2005, IDW Publishing revived Jon Sable and Grimjack with new miniseries and reprint collections of the First Comics issues, and would also publish a complete collection of Mars. In 2007 IDW also started reprinting Badger as well as starting a new series. IDW also reprinted the four Oz stories by Eric Shanower originally published as issues of First Graphic Novel as Adventures in Oz. First Graphic Novel also featured colorized reprints of early issues of the original Teenage Mutant Ninja Turtles series.

== See also ==
- The F-Men
