= John Ostrander =

American comic book writer (born 1949)

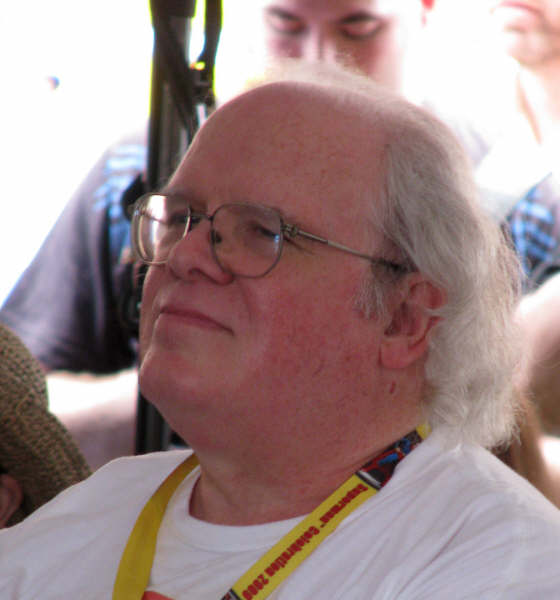
- John Ostrander at the 2009 Metropolis, Illinois Superman Celebration
- Born: April 20, 1949 (age 77)
- Area: Writer
- Notable works: Eternal Warrior; Firestorm; Grimjack; Hawkworld; Manhunter; Martian Manhunter; The Spectre; Star Wars: Legacy; Suicide Squad
- Spouse: Kim Yale

John Ostrander (born April 20, 1949) is an American writer of comic books, including Suicide Squad, Grimjack and Star Wars: Legacy.

He co-created the Oracle persona for Barbara Gordon and created the second and modern version of the antihero/supervillain team the Suicide Squad, of which the films Suicide Squad (2016) and The Suicide Squad (2021) are based on.

== Career ==
Ostrander studied theology with the intent of becoming a Catholic priest, but now describes himself as an agnostic.

Originally an actor in the Organic Theater Company in Chicago, Ostrander moved into writing comics in 1983. His first published works were stories about the character "Sargon, Mistress of War", and appeared in the First Comics series Warp!, based on a series of plays by that same Chicago theater company. He and Timothy Truman co-created the character Grimjack, who originally appeared in a backup story in the First Comics title, Starslayer, before receiving his own title. Just prior to entering the comics industry, Ostrander had a supporting character named for him in The Daring New Adventures of Supergirl series. His friend, writer Paul Kupperberg, incorporated him into the Supergirl storyline in 1982.

Thanks to then-editor and co-founder of First Comics Mike Gold, Ostrander made his DC Comics debut by plotting the miniseries Legends, which was scripted by Len Wein and penciled by John Byrne. A new version of the Suicide Squad was introduced in Legends, including the team's leader, Amanda Waller. The character has been substantially adapted into animated and live-action media and is portrayed by Viola Davis in the 2016 film Suicide Squad and the 2021 film The Suicide Squad. Following Legends, Ostrander and artist Luke McDonnell launched the Suicide Squad into their own title in 1987 and developed several characters for the series. Later that same year, he and actor/writer Del Close created the Wasteland series with a rotating roster of artists. He and Close had previously worked together on Munden's Bar backup stories in Grimjack.

From 1987 until her death from breast cancer in 1997, Ostrander frequently co-wrote with his wife Kim Yale including on the Manhunter series. It was while working together on Suicide Squad that they recast Barbara Gordon, the former Batgirl, into the information and computer specialist Oracle.

Ostrander has been a frequent collaborator with artist Tom Mandrake. They have worked together on Grimjack, Firestorm, The Spectre, and Martian Manhunter. Ostrander's in-depth explorations of morality were used in his work writing The Spectre, a DC Comics series about the manifestation of the wrath of God. His focus on the character's human aspect, a dead police detective from the 1930s named Jim Corrigan, and his exploration of moral and theological themes. In issue #54 (June 1997), the creative team introduced the character Michael Holt as a new version of Mister Terrific. Following the end of The Spectre series, they moved onto a Martian Manhunter series. In December 2006, a story-arc titled "Grotesk" by Ostrander and Mandrake appeared in Batman issues 659–662.

In 1990, Ostrander launched an ongoing Hawkworld series which followed Timothy Truman's limited series of the same name. In 1993, the title was cancelled and relaunched as Hawkman with art by Jan Duursema.

At Marvel Comics, Ostrander has worked on X-Men, Bishop, Quicksilver, Heroes for Hire and the Punisher, as well as the Western mini-series Blaze of Glory: The Last Ride of the Western Heroes.

He has written the Elfquest character Jink for WaRP Graphics, Hotspur for Eclipse Comics; Lady Death for Chaos! Comics; Magnus, Robot Fighter, Rai and the Future Force and Eternal Warrior for Valiant Comics. He was one of the main writers on Star Wars: Republic for Dark Horse Comics, and his story arcs include "Twilight", "Darkness", and "The Clone Wars" stories. He is the writer of Star Wars: Legacy. An unreleased Doctor Who audio drama titled "Deadman's Hand" was written by Ostrander for Big Finish Productions. As announced, the story was to feature the Seventh Doctor, Ace and Hex in the American wild west.

Ostrander contributed to the Silver Age Sentinels short story anthologies from Guardians of Order. He was nominated for the Comics Buyer's Guide Award for Favorite Writer in 1997, 1998, 1999, and 2000. In 2010, he co-wrote Secret Six issues 14–18 with writer Gail Simone. Ostrander maintains an online presence on the World Famous Comics Network and writes a weekly column on the ComicMix site. Ostrander made a cameo appearance as Dr. Fitzgibbon in the 2021 film The Suicide Squad.

== Personal life ==
Ostrander suffers from glaucoma. To help cover the costs incurred by his treatment for it, a benefit auction was organized for the 2009 Chicago Comic Con.

== Bibliography ==
=== Dark Horse Comics ===
- Comics' Greatest World Out of the Vortex #1–3 (1993)
- Predator vs. Magnus Robot Fighter #1–2 (1992)
- Star Wars #19–22, 32–45 (2000–2002)
- Star Wars: Agent of the Empire: Iron Eclipse #1–5 (2011–2012)
- Star Wars: Agent of the Empire: Hard Targets #1–5 (2012–2013)
- Star Wars: Boba Fett: Agent of Doom (2000)
- Star Wars: Dawn of the Jedi #0–5 (2012)
- Star Wars: Jedi: Aayla Secura #1 (2003)
- Star Wars: Jedi: Count Dooku #1 (2003)
- Star Wars: Jedi: Mace Windu #1 (2003)
- Star Wars: Jedi: Shaak Ti #1 (2003)
- Star Wars: Legacy #0–50, 0 1/2 (2006–2010)
- Star Wars: Legacy: War #1–6 (2010–2011)
- Star Wars: Purge #1 (2005)
- Star Wars: Purge: Seconds to Die #1 (2009)
- Star Wars: Republic #19–22, 32–35, 46–50, 54, 59, 61–66, 68–78, 81–83 (2001–2006)
- Star Wars Tales #3, 8 (2000–2001)
- Star Wars: The Clone Wars Volume 3: The Wind Raiders of Taloraan (2009)

=== DC Comics ===
- 52/WW III #3–4 (2007)
- All Star Comics 80-Page Giant #1 (1999)
- Aquaman vol. 5 #13–14, 23–24 (2004–2005)
- Aquaman vol. 6 #20, Annual #1 (2013)
- Armageddon: Inferno #1–4 (1992)
- Batman #659–662, Annual #24 (2000–2007)
- The Batman Chronicles #5 (1996)
- Batman: Gotham Knights #43 (Batman Black and White) (2003)
- Batman: Gotham Nights #1–4 (1992)
- Batman: Gotham Nights II #1–4 (1995)
- Batman: Legends of the Dark Knight #159–161 (2002–2003)
- Batman: Penguin Triumphant #1 (1992)
- Batman: Seduction of the Gun #1 (1993)
- Blackhawk #7, Special #1 (1989–1991)
- Bullets and Bracelets #1 (1996)
- Captain Atom #54–57 (1991)
- Catwoman vol. 2 #72–77 (1999–2000)
- Deadshot #1–4 (1988)
- Detective Comics #622–624 (1990)
- Doom Patrol and Suicide Squad #1 (1988)
- Firestorm the Nuclear Man #65–100, Annual #5 (1987–1990)
- Fury of Firestorm #55–56, 58–64 (1987)
- Golden Age Secret Files #1 (2001)
- Green Lantern Corps Quarterly #1 (1992)
- Hawkman vol. 3 #1–6, Annual #1 (1993–1994)
- Hawkworld vol. 2 #1–32, Annual #1–3 (1990–1993)
- JLA 80-Page Giant #1 (1998)
- JLA versus Predator #1 (2001)
- JLA: Incarnations #1–7 (2001–2002)
- Justice League Adventures #21 (2003)
- Justice League Quarterly #6 (1992)
- The Kents #1–12 (1997–1998)
- Legends #1–6 (1986–1987)
- Manhunter #1–23 (1988–1990)
- Martian Manhunter #0, 1,000,000, 1–36 (1998–2001)
- Secret Origins vol. 2 #14 (1987)
- Secret Six vol. 2 #15, 17–18, 23 (2010)
- Showcase '95 #8 (1995)
- Spectre vol. 3 #0, 1–62, Annual #1 (1992–1998)
- Spectre vol. 4 #19 (2002)
- Suicide Squad #1–66, Annual #1 (1987–1992)
- Suicide Squad #67 ("Blackest Night" one-shot crossover) (2010)
- Suicide Squad: Raise the Flag #1–8 (2007–2008)
- Tangent Comics/Nightwing #1 (1997)
- Tangent Comics/Nightwing: Night Force #1 (1998)
- Tangent Comics/Tales of the Green Lantern #1 (1998)
- Teen Titans Spotlight #10 (Aqualad) (1987)
- Wasteland #1–18 (1987–1989)
- Wonder Woman #23.1 (2013)

=== First Comics ===
- Dynamo Joe #1–3 (1986)
- First Adventures #1–5 (1985–1986)
- Grimjack #1–81 (1984–1991)
- Mars #10–12 (1984–1985)
- Starslayer #9–34 (1983–1985)
- Warp #1, 5–7 (1983)

=== Image Comics ===
- Deathmate Blue #1 (1993)

=== Marvel Comics ===
- Apache Skies #1–4 (2002)
- Bishop #1–4 (1994–1995)
- Bishop: XSE #1–3 (1998)
- Blaze of Glory: The Last Ride of the Western Heroes #1–4 (2000)
- Double Edge: Omega #1 (1995)
- Heroes for Hire #1–19 (1997–1999)
- Heroes for Hire/Quicksilver '98 #1 (1998)
- Marvel Holiday Special #4 (1995)
- Marvel Valentine Special #1 (1997)
- Punisher vol. 3 #1–18 (1995–1997)
- Wolverine '97 #1 (1997)
- X-Man #9–14 (1995–1996)
- X-Men Unlimited #30, 32–33 (2001)
- X-Men Vs. the Brood #1–2 (1996)
- XSE #1–4 (1996–1997)

=== Valiant Comics ===
- Eternal Warrior #27–50 (1994–1996)
- Magnus, Robot Fighter vol. 2 #21–33 (1993–1994)
- Rai and the Future Force #9–17 (1993–1994)

Preceded by Chuck Dixon	The Punisher writer 1995–1997	Succeeded by Christopher Golden and Thomas E. Sniegoski
Preceded by Devin K. Grayson	Catwoman vol. 2 writer 1999–2000	Succeeded by Bronwyn Carlton
Preceded by Rick Veitch	Aquaman vol. 5 writer 2003–2004	Succeeded by Will Pfeifer
Preceded by Will Pfeifer	Aquaman vol. 5 writer 2004	Succeeded by John Arcudi
