= Colorist =

Responsible for adding color to black-and-white line art

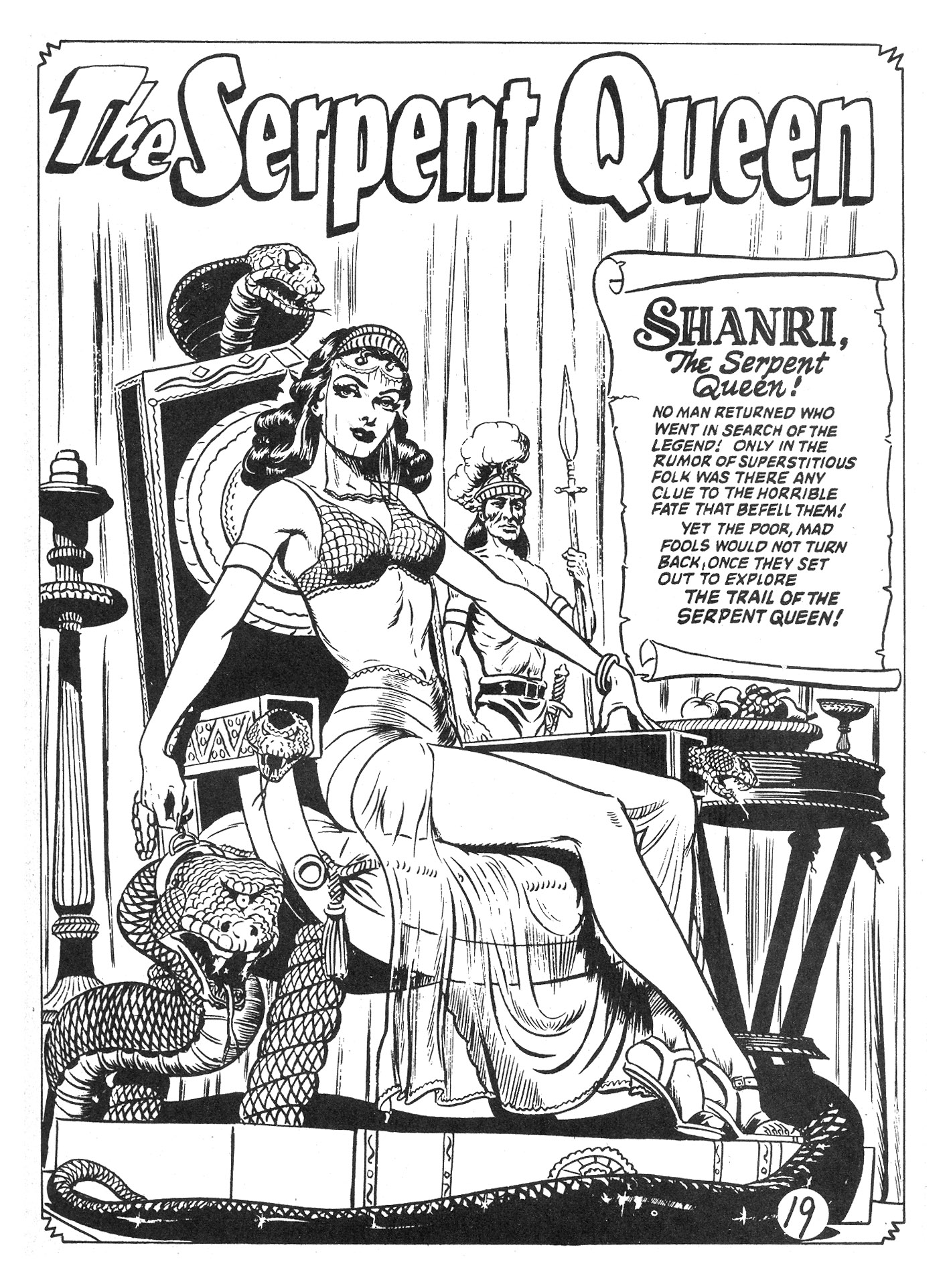
Page from Unknown World #1 (1952)

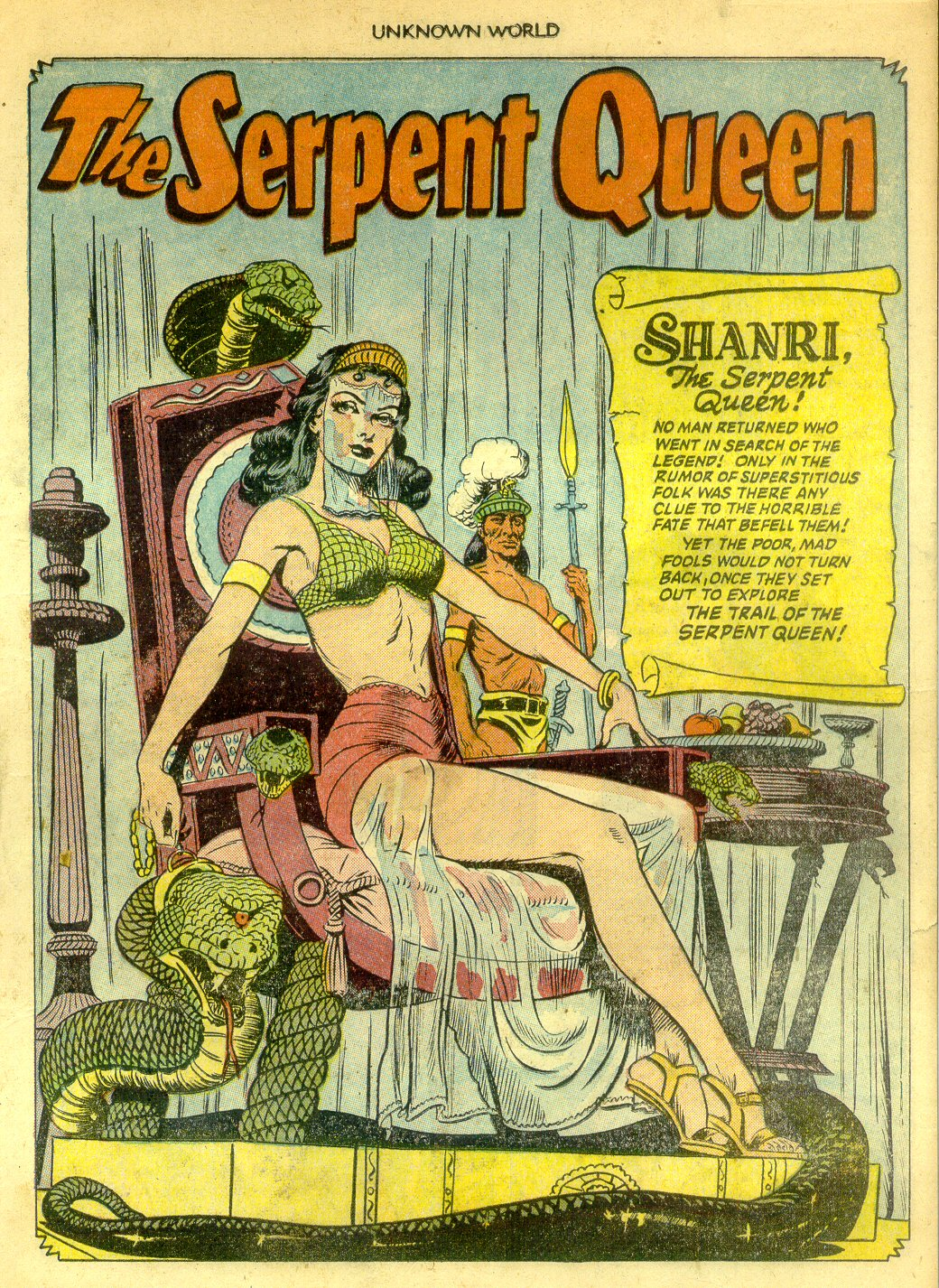

In comics, a colorist is responsible for adding color to black-and-white line art. For most of the 20th century this was done using brushes and dyes which were then used as guides to produce the printing plates. Since the late 20th century it is most often done using digital media, with printing separations produced electronically.

Although most American colorists work directly for comics publishers (either as employees or freelancers), there are a few coloring studios which offer their services to publishers. American Color, Olyoptics, Digital Chameleon were the companies notable in this field.

== History ==
Originally, comics were colored by cutting out films of various densities in the appropriate shapes to be used in producing color-separated printing plates. The typical colorist worked from photocopies of the inked pages, which they colored with special dyes. Dr. Martin's Dyes was a brand notable in this field within the comic strip industry. CMYK codes were written on the page to indicate the final printed colors, and these hand-colored pages were used as guides by the engraver. Tatjana Wood was the main colorist for DC Comics' covers from 1973 through the mid-1980s.

More recently, colorists have worked in transparent media such as watercolors or airbrush, which is then photographed, allowing more subtle and painterly effects.

== Digital color ==
Colorist Steve Oliff and his company Olyoptics were one of the first to use computers to do color separations. Although other companies at the time were experimenting with computers, Oliff and his crew were the first to blend the color guide artist with the separator. In 1987, the Japanese manga Akira was in preparation to be translated and published by Marvel Comics's Epic Comics line. Oliff was chosen as the colorist, and he convinced Marvel that it was time to try computer color. After the publication of Akira in 1988, computer coloring became increasingly prevalent in the comics industry.

By the early 1990s, even though the larger comics publishers were using computers, there were variations within the field. DC Comics allowed only a 64-color palette, while Marvel had expanded it to 125 colors. Dark Horse Comics allowed even more variations. The dominant programs in use during that time were Color Prep and Tint Prep, both originally implemented by Olyoptics. This software was invented and written by Pixel Craft, the first company to create software that used a personal computer that could output files for a digital image setter to make negatives for color printing. Pixel Craft was a small company in Long Island, New York, created by Kenneth Giordano and Khouri Giordano. The father and son team went on to accomplish many first in the computerization of color print. In 1993, Image Comics' use of computer color and more advanced color separation technology propelled DC and Marvel to further upgrade their coloring techniques. Finally, in the mid-1990s, Digital Chameleon's facility with Adobe Photoshop helped make that program the industry standard.

The improvements in the technology used for coloring have had a great impact on the way comics are drawn. Before the use of computers, artists would often use the pen or brush to put in detailed shading effects; now, the artist is more likely to leave the drawing open and leave it to the colorist to insert shading through variation in color tones or through adding a layer of translucent black. Most contemporary colorists work in digital media using tools.

== Notable colorists ==
- Jack Adler
- David Baron
- Josette Baujot
- Jordie Bellaire
- Jeromy Cox
- Nine Culliford
- George Freeman, formerly with Digital Chameleon
- John Higgins
- Matt Hollingsworth
- Richard Isanove
- Vittorio Leonardo
- Lee Loughridge
- Laura Martin
- Dave McCaig
- Paul Mounts
- Steve Oliff, founder of Olyoptics
- Cris Peter
- Marie Severin
- Dave Stewart
- Christina Strain
- Lynn Varley
- Jose Villarrubia
- Glynis Wein
- Tatjana Wood

== See also ==
- Color grading
- Flatter
- Inker
- Letterer
- Penciller
