= Steve Erwin =

American comics artist (1960–2023)

- Born: Stephen Erwin; January 16, 1960 Tulsa, Oklahoma, U.S.
- Died: October 25, 2023 (aged 63)
- Area: Penciller
- Notable works: Deathstroke the Terminator; Checkmate! Batman Returns movie adaptation

Stephen Erwin (January 16, 1960 – October 25, 2023) was an American comics artist best known as the co-creator of Checkmate! and Gunfire for DC Comics.

== Biography ==
Steve Erwin was born on January 16, 1960. He studied commercial art at Oklahoma State University-Okmulgee. He credited Neal Adams' Batman stories and Gene Colan's and Tom Palmer's work on Daredevil as having "won my heart in junior high to aspiring (dreaming) to be a comic book artist." Erwin's first published comic book work appeared in Grimjack #18 (January 1986), published by First Comics. During the 1980s and 1990s, he worked primarily for DC Comics, his first story for that publisher appearing in The Vigilante #48 (December 1987). After that title's cancellation, Erwin co-created the title Checkmate! with writer Paul Kupperberg. In August 1991, Erwin and Marv Wolfman launched the Deathstroke the Terminator title, a series that Erwin would draw from 1991 to 1994. The Gunfire character was created by Len Wein and Erwin in Deathstroke the Terminator Annual #3 (October 1993). Erwin drew the comics adaptation of Batman Returns as well as Star Trek: The Next Generation Shadowheart, the graphic novel adaptation of The Ashes of Eden, and the Mike Danger series published by Tekno Comix.

In 2007, Erwin was inducted into the Oklahoma Cartoonists Hall of Fame in Pauls Valley, Oklahoma, located in the Toy and Action Figure Museum.

Erwin died on October 25, 2023, at the age of 63.

== Bibliography ==
=== DC Comics ===
- Batman Returns: The Official Comic Adaptation of the Warner Bros. Motion Picture #1 (1992)
- Checkmate! #1–8, 11–13, 15, 17–25, 30 (1988–1990)
- Deathstroke the Terminator #1–9, 13, 17–21, 26–27, 29–34, Annual #2 (1991–1994)
- Gunfire #1–5 (1994)
- Hawk and Dove vol. 3 #21–22 (1991)
- New Gods vol. 3 #23–25 (1991)
- The New Titans #68–70 (1990)
- Showcase '96 #5 (1996)
- Star Trek #79, Special #3 (1995–1996)
- Star Trek: The Next Generation Shadowheart #1–4 (1994–1995)
- Star Trek: The Next Generation Special #2 (1994)
- Superboy vol. 3 #23 (1996)
- Superman: The Man of Steel #38 (1994)
- Titans Sell-Out Special #1 (1993)
- Vigilante #48–50 (1987–1988)
- Who's Who in the DC Universe #6–7 (1991)
- Who's Who: The Definitive Directory of the DC Universe #16 (1986)
- Who's Who Update '88 #1, 4 (1988)

=== First Comics ===
- Grimjack #18–20 (1986)
- Shatter #3–7 (1986–1987)

=== Malibu Comics ===
- The Ferret #5–6 (1993)
- Star Trek: Deep Space Nine Worf Special #0 (1995)
- Ultraforce #7 (1995)

=== Marvel Comics ===
- ID4: Independence Day #0, 2 (1996)
- Star Trek: Operation Assimilation #1 (1997)

Preceded by Mike Saenz	Shatter artist 1986–1987	Succeeded by Paul Abrams
Preceded by n/a	Deathstroke, the Terminator artist 1991–1994	Succeeded by Lauchland Pelle
Preceded by n/a	Gunfire artist 1994	Succeeded by Ed Benes
