= 1985 in science fiction =

The year 1985 was marked, in science fiction, by the following:

== Events ==
- The 43rd annual Worldcon, Aussiecon Two, was held in Melbourne, Australia
- The first Deutscher Science Fiction Preis are awarded

== Births and deaths ==
=== Births ===
- Arkady Martine

=== Deaths ===
- Theodore Sturgeon

== Literary releases ==
=== Novels ===
- Chapterhouse: Dune by Frank Herbert
- Contact by Carl Sagan
- Ender's Game, by Orson Scott Card
- Galápagos, by Kurt Vonnegut
- The Handmaid's Tale, by Margaret Atwood
- Hard-Boiled Wonderland and the End of the World, by Haruki Murakami

=== Comics ===
- Appleseed, by Masamune Shirow, begins serialization in Comic Gaia
- Shatter, by Peter B. Gillis and Mike Saenz

== Movies ==
- Back to the Future, dir. by Robert Zemeckis
- Brazil, dir. by Terry Gilliam
- The Quiet Earth, dir. by Geoff Murphy

== Television ==
- The Twilight Zone (1985 revival)

== Video games ==
- A Mind Forever Voyaging

== Awards ==
=== Hugos ===
- Best novel: Neuromancer by William Gibson
- Best novella: Press Enter by John Varley
- Best novelette: "Bloodchild" by Octavia E. Butler
- Best short story: "The Crystal Spheres" by David Brin
- Best related work: Wonder's Child: My Life in Science Fiction by Jack Williamson
- Best dramatic presentation: 2010: The Year We Make Contact, dir. by Peter Hyams; screenplay by Peter Hyams; based on the novel by Arthur C. Clarke
- Best professional editor: Terry Carr
- Best professional artist: Michael Whelan
- Best Semiprozine: Locus, ed. by Charles N. Brown
- Best fanzine: File 770 ed. by Mike Glyer
- Best fan writer: David Langford
- Best fan artist: Alexis A. Gilliland

=== Nebulas ===
- Best novel: Ender's Game by Orson Scott Card
- Best novella: Sailing to Byzantium, by Robert Silverberg
- Best novelette: "Portraits of His Children" by George R. R. Martin
- Best short story: "Out of All Them Bright Stars" by Nancy Kress

=== Other awards ===
- BSFA Award for Best Novel: Helliconia Winter by Brian W. Aldiss
- Locus Award for Best Science Fiction Novel: The Integral Trees, by Larry Niven
- Saturn Award for Best Science Fiction Film: Back to the Future
