= Tailgunner Joe =

Tailgunner Joe, Tail Gunner Joe, Tail-Gunner Joe, and similar variants typically refer to Joseph McCarthy (1908–1957), Republican United States senator from Wisconsin from 1947 to 1957.

It could also refer to:

- Tail Gunner Joe, a 1977 American television movie directed by Jud Taylor about McCarthy

== See also ==
- Tailgunner Jo, a 1988 limited series published by DC Comics
