= Real Sex =

- Genre: Erotica, Documentary
- Created by: Sheila Nevins
- Directed by: Patti Kaplan
- Opening theme: "Perfidia" by Mambo All-Stars
- Ending theme: "Patricia" by Perez Prado
- Composer: Perez Prado
- Country of origin: United States
- Original language: English
- No. of episodes: 33

Production
- Production company: HBO Studios Productions

Original release
- Network: HBO
- Release: June 1990 – December 2009

Real Sex is a documentary television series produced by HBO. Real Sex was a sexually explicit "magazine" which "explores sex '90s style." Created by Sheila Nevins and produced by Patti Kaplan, the series began as a single 60-minute special about sexuality, largely in response to the cultural attitudes surrounding sex in the wake of the AIDS epidemic of the 1980s. The series was female-run, and segments were largely directed by women.

Real Sex explores human sexuality. Gary R. Edgerton and Jeffrey P. Jones described the fare in The Essential HBO Reader as "a peek into the diversity of sexual activities...with an emphasis that ranges from the unusual to the bizarre." The show typically explores three to four topics each episode. Segments are separated by street interviews with random people, relating to the episode's topics. It spawned a spin-off series called Pornucopia.

In 2018, HBO began removing the show from its streaming services HBO GO and HBO Now, along with similar series Cathouse and Taxicab Confessions, making them largely unavailable.

== Subsequent release history ==
While a hit show for HBO during its original run in the 90s (with HBO rerunning the series and compiling "best of" episodes to air late night until the final 2009 episode), HBO has declined to include it in any of its various streaming services such as HBO Go and HBO Max/Max. In the Vice documentary series "Sex Before The Internet", series creator Sheila Nevins lamented the show's unavailability, stating that HBO largely disowned the series after finding mainstream critical success with shows like "The Sopranos" and "The Wire" and considers the series and other sexually explicit shows such as The Cathouse, as old shames. HBO's response in the documentary is that "there hasn't been a strong demand for this kind of adult programming, perhaps because it's easily available elsewhere."

== Episode guide ==
Episode #	Original Air Date	Episode title (when applicable)	Segment title	Description
Episode 01	November 13, 1990		"How to Strip (for your man)"	A striptease class taught by LaGioconda (a.k.a. Lisa Suarez).
Episode 01	November 13, 1990		"A Family Business"	A husband and wife strip couple filmed at Big Al's in Peoria, IL.
Episode 01	November 13, 1990		Sex by Telephone	A brief segment about phone sex which grossed $400 million last year (1989?). A vast majority of callers are male and earn more than $30,000/yr. The average caller spends $45 for 30 minutes.
Episode 01	November 13, 1990		"Portrait of a Virgin"	A 31-year-old virgin talks about her chaste lifestyle, and how she plans to wait to have sex until she is married.
Episode 01	November 13, 1990		"Homemade Home Video"	A kinky homemade video of a couple jumping into bed filmed by Adam Crown.
Episode 01	November 13, 1990		"Sex for One"	A masturbation class for women taught by Betty Dodson, Ph.D.
Episode 01	November 13, 1990		"An Actress Turns Director"	Erotic films for women directed by Candida Royalle and Femme Productions.
Episode 02			"Stripper with a Difference"	Jane Jones strip show and exotic circus includes a 600 lb. Siberian tiger named Qadesh, a Burmese python, and a topless saxophone performance.
Episode 02			"Sex Under Glass"	Carol Queen's peep show.
Episode 02			"The HOW-TO-MAKE-LOVE Couple"	Married couple Donna and Gary filming Videos for Lovers for the Better Sex Institute.
Episode 02			"The Madam and The Prostitute"	Madam Beverly Harrell of the Cottontail Ranch
Episode 02			"Annie Sprinkle's Sluts and Goddesses"	Women dressing up in Annie Sprinkle's clothes and acting out slut and goddess fantasies.
Episode 03			"Cherokee Sex Workshop"	
Episode 03			"A Stimulating Collection"	
Episode 03			"The Honorable Cicciolina"	
Episode 03			"Mister Madam"	
Episode 03			"Auntie Maim's House Of Domination"	
Episode 04	August 13, 1992		"Annie Sprinkle's One Woman Show"	Annie Sprinkle's show about her sexual evolution from a shy teenager to porn star and exhibitionist.
Episode 04	August 13, 1992		"The Agony & The Ecstasy"	1991 Miss Nude World pageant organized by Samantha Jones.
Episode 04	August 13, 1992		"Deutschland's Top Quiz Show"	German game show called Tutti Frutti where contestants removed various items of clothing.
Episode 04	August 13, 1992		"Tell Me Your Fantasy"	Live tele-fantasy New York public access show called Voyeurvision hosted by Lynn Muscarella.
Episode 04	August 13, 1992		"Riding the Orgasmic Wave"	Oceanic Tantra workshop where the couples undulate like dolphins through the waters of Maui.
Episode 05	August 13, 1992		"Introducing Venus De Light"	Lynn Chase's exotic burlesque dance and animal show. She boxes for stress relief.
Episode 05	August 13, 1992		"Of Human Bondage"	Frank and Ona Zee show home spanking and bondage play.
Episode 05	August 13, 1992		"Doctor/Director Frank Sommers M.D."	Dr Frank Sommers, M.D. makes short sex education films for women.
Episode 05	August 13, 1992		"Susanne Bartsch's Girls Girls Girls"	Susanne Bartsch throws a drag queen show (including RuPaul).
Episode 05	August 13, 1992		"Sex Shop Granny"	Beate Uhse talks about her well-known German sex store.
Episode 06 (1993)	August 5, 1993		"Cyber-Sex Game"	Mike Saenz creates an early adult interactive video games called Virtual Valerie.
Episode 06 (1993)	August 5, 1993		"The Royal Sex Maniacs' Ball"	Tuppy Owens creates the anything goes Sex Maniacs Ball to raise funds for disabled people. It includes an early view of virtual reality sex.
Episode 06 (1993)	August 5, 1993		"A Filmmaker's Fetish Fantasy"	Eric Kroll takes fetish photos of 3 women wearing girdles.
Episode 06 (1993)	August 5, 1993		"Adam's Whips & Gillian's Toys"	A couple makes sensual whips and toys.
Episode 06 (1993)	August 5, 1993		"Pleasure Bus of Brazil"	An exotic play called Soltando a Franga by Sady Cinema which loosely translates to "Release the Inhibitions". The driver is Sady Baby (a.k.a. Sady Plauth) an infamous actor and filmmaker
Episode 07	November 11, 1993		"Naked City"	Photographer takes quirky fine art black-and-white nudes of his friends on the streets of New York.
Episode 07	November 11, 1993		"For Women Only"	Michelle's XXX Revue is a Los Angeles lesbian and bisexual strip club founded by promoter Michelle Levy.
Episode 07	November 11, 1993		"From Russia With Love"	Russian men's magazine Andrei[sp].
Episode 07	November 11, 1993		"Libido"	The couple behind Libido The Journal of Sex and Sensibility shoot a nude layout for the magazine.
Episode 07	November 11, 1993		"The Master of Non-Ejaculation"	A virile Chinese senior citizen.
Episode 08	March 17, 1994		"Moscow's School of Striptizi"	Alla Maximova (Алла Максимова) striptease school for the "new" Russian woman
Episode 08	March 17, 1994		"Members Only"	Male sexual seminar, men only
Episode 08	March 17, 1994		"Lady & Lord K of RIO"	Sexy male and female 'rock stars' in Rio perform in the nude "they practice what they preach"
Episode 08	March 17, 1994		"How to read a Dirty Movie"	Porn critic and sex educator Susie Bright gives seminar on 'how to read a dirty movie'
Episode 08	March 17, 1994		"The Exotic Erotic Ball"	Exotic Erotic Ball was held up through 2009 at various locations throughout California; the 2010 ball was cancelled the day before the show, and no ball was scheduled in 2011
Episode 09	August 13, 1994		"A Thousand and one Nights with Ylva"	Ylva Maria Thompson's wild late night Swedish TV show. "Tusen & en natt"
Episode 09	August 13, 1994		"Body, Heart and Soul"	5 day Love, Sex and Sensuality workshop in Hawaii with Alan Lowen
Episode 09	August 13, 1994		"Girls will be Boys"	Drag king show mixed with strip show, to show how fluid sexuality is.
Episode 09	August 13, 1994		"CYBORGASM The Making of a XXX-rated CD"	An erotic party that is recorded to create an adult audio CD Lisa Palac and M. Gantt
Episode 09	August 13, 1994		"Bare & Bold"	Mr Nude Universe
Episode 10			"Pins & Needles"	
Episode 10			"Paris After Dark"	
Episode 10			"Interactive Fantasies"	
Episode 10			"Cross Dress For Success"	
Episode 10			"Valeria: Queen Of Carnival"	
Episode 11	July 1, 1995		"Call-In Love Radio"	
Episode 11	July 1, 1995		"The Ultimate Orgasm"	
Episode 11	July 1, 1995		"Doris Does Dungeons"	
Episode 11	July 1, 1995		"Pajama Party Live (Behind The Scenes)"	
Episode 11	July 1, 1995		"London's Rubber Ball"	
Episode 12	July 1, 1995		"Getting Off On-Line"	
Episode 12	July 1, 1995		"The Black Orchid"	
Episode 12	July 1, 1995		"Truck Stop On Highway 93"	
Episode 12	July 1, 1995		"Video Erotique Avec Laetitia"	
Episode 12	July 1, 1995		"Taking Care Of Business"	
Episode 13			"Electric Sex With Dante Amore"	
Episode 13			"Jocelyn Taylor's Lesbian Erotica"	
Episode 13			"Whiplash"	
Episode 13			"A Tight Squeeze"	
Episode 13			"Golden Oldies"	
Episode 14			"Wild Cards Special"	Annie Sprinkle with Lily Braindrop Borana, Jennifer Einstein, Dominique D'Anthony, Danielle Willis & Jennifer Blowdryer
Episode 15	August 14, 1996		"Heather Takes Off"	
Episode 15	August 14, 1996		"Homemade Love Movies"	
Episode 15	August 14, 1996		"Hot Shots In Rio"	
Episode 15	August 14, 1996		"Folsom Street Fair"	
Episode 15	August 14, 1996		"A Family Tradition"	
Episode 16	January 17, 1996		"Miss Black Nude"	
Episode 16	January 17, 1996		"For Swingers Only"	
Episode 16	January 17, 1996		"Passion Food"	
Episode 16	January 17, 1996		"Supermarket Du Sex"	
Episode 17	January 14, 1997		"Nudes-A-Poppin'"	
Episode 17	January 14, 1997		"Out To Africa With Photographer Uwe Ommer"	
Episode 17	January 14, 1997		"Fun House"	
Episode 17	January 14, 1997		"Yoyogi-San Master Of Orgasm"	
Episode 18	March 14, 1997		"Wild Anna Malle"	
Episode 18	March 14, 1997		"Through The Looking Glass"	
Episode 18	March 14, 1997		"Secrets Of Nina's Boudoir"	
Episode 18	March 14, 1997		"Erotic Art Auction"	
Episode 19	February 7, 1998		"Down 'N Dirty"	A group gets together to play in the mud in the desert.
Episode 19	February 7, 1998		"Miss Black nude: Going Tropical"	Club 55 in Washington DC (closed in 2008) and Hedonism II sponsored beauty pageant for black women.
Episode 19	February 7, 1998		"Male-Order Fantasies"	
Episode 19	February 7, 1998		"Doktor Hirschfeld's Museum Of Sexologoy"	
Episode 20	May 2, 1998		"The Barest In The Land"	Miss nude world 1998 exotic dancer competition at the "pink pony club" in Atlanta GA. Won by "Holly Montana"
Episode 20	May 2, 1998		"Ladies' Night"	Monthly Male exotic dancer show in Philadelphia, Pennsylvania. Arranged by Lady Simzie
Episode 20	May 2, 1998		"Polyamory"	Deborah Annapol workshop on polyamory and relationships.
Episode 20	May 2, 1998		"Naked Art"	a Nude art exhibition in New York City 'Natasha VonRosenchilde' is the artist.
Episode 21	September 5, 1998		"The Feel of Real"	The making of realistic sex toys from capture of porn stars' "parts" to manufacturing
Episode 21	September 5, 1998		"Voyeur's Vacation"	Oakland, CA's Edgewater West Hotel (now closed)
Episode 21	September 5, 1998		"Doris Wishman: Queen of Sexploitation"	Old-Fashioned Erotica
Episode 21	September 5, 1998		"An Art Gallery Exhibition(ist)"	the production of a lesbianism-themed art exhibition called "Women Loving Women," which included live lesbian sex performances by porn star Missy and other women in the gallery, with some of the female patrons participating
Episode 22	February 20, 1999		"Real Dolls"	Making of and playing with realistic ($6,000) female RealDolls from Abyss Creations
Episode 22	February 20, 1999		"Tantric Sex: Riding the Orgasm"	workshop on full-body orgasms
Episode 22	February 20, 1999		"Fun 4 Two"	European Sex Club for Couples, Holland farmhouse where couples live out their fantasies
Episode 22	February 20, 1999		"Exotic Erotic Wedding"	Performers '13' and 'Princess' of the 'Impotent Sea Snakes' get married at San Francisco's Exotic Erotic Ball
Episode 23	May 8, 1999		"Rumpshakers"	arousing African-American dancers
Episode 23	May 8, 1999		"Masturbation Club"	"Club Relate", the only heterosexual masturbation club in America
Episode 23	May 8, 1999		"Annie Sprinkle: Coming Again"	an adult-film star-turned-performance artist
Episode 24	February 26, 2000		"How to please a penis"	Suburban housewives learn new oral and tactile techniques at a home party
Episode 24	February 26, 2000		"Punany Poets"	Exotic Performers read erotic poetry they've written as part of their show
Episode 24	February 26, 2000		"Tootsie Roles"	Foot fetishists
Episode 24	February 26, 2000		"Sploshing"	British specialty that features arousal by playing in a variety of sloppy foods.
Episode 25	June 17, 2000	Real Sex: 25	"Strut Your Strap On"	featuring Tristan Taormino
Episode 25	June 17, 2000	Real Sex: 25	"Texas Flirt Fest"	
Episode 25	June 17, 2000	Real Sex: 25	"Blue Angel Cabaret"	
Episode 25	June 17, 2000	Real Sex: 25	"Dr. Suzy's Speakeasy"	featuring Susan Block
Episode 26	April 7, 2001	"Lessons in Love & Lust"	"Clit Tricks"	Cunnilingus workshop
Episode 26	April 7, 2001	"Lessons in Love & Lust"	"Swingstock "	Swingstock '99 – Swingers camping convention in Rural Minnesota
Episode 26	April 7, 2001	"Lessons in Love & Lust"	"how to be Miss Florida"	Florida Exotic Dancer competition
Episode 26	April 7, 2001	"Lessons in Love & Lust"	"Latex Sex"	The joys of latex – from paint-on liquid latex to being vacuum sealed between sheets of latex
Episode 27	June 2, 2001		"Underwater Erotica"	
Episode 27	June 2, 2001		"Voyeur Dorm"	Nine college girls live in a house filled with 55 cameras
Episode 27	June 2, 2001		"Lick It"	Exotic Dancer with very long tongue
Episode 27	June 2, 2001		"Sex Odyssey"	Sex toys made of Pyrex
Episode 28	October 27, 2001	"Bedroom Tricks & Treats"	"Ride Pony Ride"	Women who enjoy playing as horses
Episode 28	October 27, 2001	"Bedroom Tricks & Treats"	"Much Ado about Nothing"	Exotic dancers get around local laws by performing MacBeth in the nude
Episode 28	October 27, 2001	"Bedroom Tricks & Treats"	"Boy Toy"	Making of and playing with realistic (US$6,000) Male Love Dolls from realdolls.com
Episode 28	October 27, 2001	"Bedroom Tricks & Treats"	"Bring Back Burlesque"	Modern exotic dancers learn the fine art of classic burlesque dancers
Episode 29	April 6, 2002	"Let it All Hang Out"	"Santa Fe Wrestling Asylum"	Oil wrestling
Episode 29	April 6, 2002	"Let it All Hang Out"	"Penis Puppeteers"	Off-Broadway show: Puppetry of the Penis
Episode 29	April 6, 2002	"Let it All Hang Out"	"Ms Nude Great Plains"	Exotic Dancer Competition that includes nude horseback riding in Topeka, Kansas
Episode 29	April 6, 2002	"Let it All Hang Out"	"Secrets of the Kama Sutra"	Couples' Kama Sutra workshop
Episode 30	August 3, 2002	"Down and Dirty"	"Sex Machines.cum"	High-tech sex toys including Violet wand and Sybian
Episode 30	August 3, 2002	"Down and Dirty"	"London's Erotic Oscars"	Erotic Oscars
Episode 30	August 3, 2002	"Down and Dirty"	"Lights, Camera, Fantasy!"	Company that provides professional video services for couples that wish to act out their fantasy
Episode 30	August 3, 2002	"Down and Dirty"	"Cirque du Sex"	Kinky Circus
Episode 31	November 22, 2003	Am I Good in Bed?	"Bottoms up"	Anal 101 featuring Tristan Taormino
Episode 31	November 22, 2003	Am I Good in Bed?	"The Suicide Girls"	Punk Pinups featuring SuicideGirls
Episode 31	November 22, 2003	Am I Good in Bed?	"Ay! Papi Chulo! Hot Latin Daddy Revue"	Latin Lovers
Episode 31	November 22, 2003	Am I Good in Bed?	"Sexual Soiree"	Sex Party
Episode 32	2005	"Some Like it Hot"	"All Fired Up"	Explores the world of erotic fire dancers
Episode 32	2005	"Some Like it Hot"	"They Came for a Cause"	Toys in Babeland's annual Masturbate-a-thon
Episode 32	2005	"Some Like it Hot"	"Masked for Action"	Mask.tv's custom pornography
Episode 32	2005	"Some Like it Hot"	Happy Birthday Baby	The world of Adult Babies
Episode 33	2009	"Stocks Down, Sex Up"	"Save the Last Lap for Me"	Produced in late 2009, this almost standalone episode looks at how sex workers are adjusting during the economic downturn of the year before.
Episode 33	2009	"Stocks Down, Sex Up"	"Flog Away"	
Episode 33	2009	"Stocks Down, Sex Up"	"Madison's Avenues	

== See also ==
- Sexcetera, a similar series on Playboy TV
