= The Punany Poets =

The Punany Poets is an ensemble performance group created by Jessica Holter in 1995. in response to the untimely death of rapper Eazy-E from AIDS complications. It was featured on HBO Real Sex Episode 24: "Dirty Words".
