= 1977 in science fiction =

The year 1977 was marked, in science fiction, by the following:

== Events ==
- The first issue of Asimov's Science Fiction is published
- Del Rey Books is formed under the editorship of Lester and Judy-Lynn Del Rey
- The 35th annual Worldcon, SunCon, is held in Miami, USA

== Births and deaths ==
=== Deaths ===
- Edmond Hamilton
- Robert Moore Williams

== Literary releases ==
=== Novels ===
- Egalia's Daughters, by Gerd Brantenberg
- Inherit the Stars, by James P. Hogan (first book of the Giants series)
- Mind of My Mind, by Octavia E. Butler
- A Scanner Darkly, by Philip K. Dick

=== Short stories ===
- " Ender's Game", by Orson Scott Card, expanded into the novel in 1985

=== Comics ===
- 2000 AD begins publication, including the first appearance of Judge Dredd in issue #2
- Galaxy Express 999, by Leiji Matsumoto, begins serialization in Weekly Shōnen King
- Heavy Metal begins publication

== Movies ==
- Close Encounters of the Third Kind
- Star Wars
- Tomorrow I'll Wake Up and Scald Myself with Tea
- Wizards

== Television ==
- The Incredible Hulk

== Other Media ==
- Hope, album by Klaatu
- Traveller role-playing game

== Awards ==
=== Hugos ===
- Best novel: Where Late the Sweet Birds Sang, by Kate Wilhelm
- Best novella: By Any Other Name, by Spider Robinson; and Houston, Houston, Do You Read?, by James Tiptree Jr.
- Best novelette: "The Bicentennial Man" by Isacc Asimov
- Best short story: "Tricentennial" by Joe Haldeman
- Best dramatic presentation: No winner
- Best professional editor: Ben Bova
- Best professional artist: Rick Sternbach
- Best fanzine: Science Fiction Review, ed. by Richard E. Geis
- Best fan writer: Richard E. Geis and Susan Wood
- Best fan artist: Phil Foglio

=== Nebulas ===
- Best novel: Gateway, by Frederick Pohl
- Best novella: Stardance, by Spider Robinson and Jeanne Robinson
- Best novelette: "The Screwfly Solution", by James Tiptree Jr.
- Best short story: "Jeffty Is Five", by Harlan Ellison

=== Other awards ===
- BSFA Award for Best Novel: The Jonah Kit, by Ian Watson
- Saturn Award for Best Science Fiction Film: Star Wars
