= Star Trek Revisitations =

Star Trek Revisitations is a graphic novel written by Howard Weinstein and illustrated by Gordon Purcell and Rod Whigham, based on the DC Comics Star Trek series, and published by Titan.

== Plot summary ==
Star Trek Revisitations features Harry Mudd becoming involved in an intergalactic rebellion.

== Reception ==
Steve Faragher reviewed Star Trek Revisitations for Arcane magazine, rating it a 3 out of 10 overall. Faragher comments that "Revisitiations is standard licensed stuff - two bland and predictable stories peppered with somebody else's ideas of what our favourite characters from the original series are like."

== Reviews ==
- Amiga User International
