= Peter B. Gillis =

American comic book writer (1952–2024)

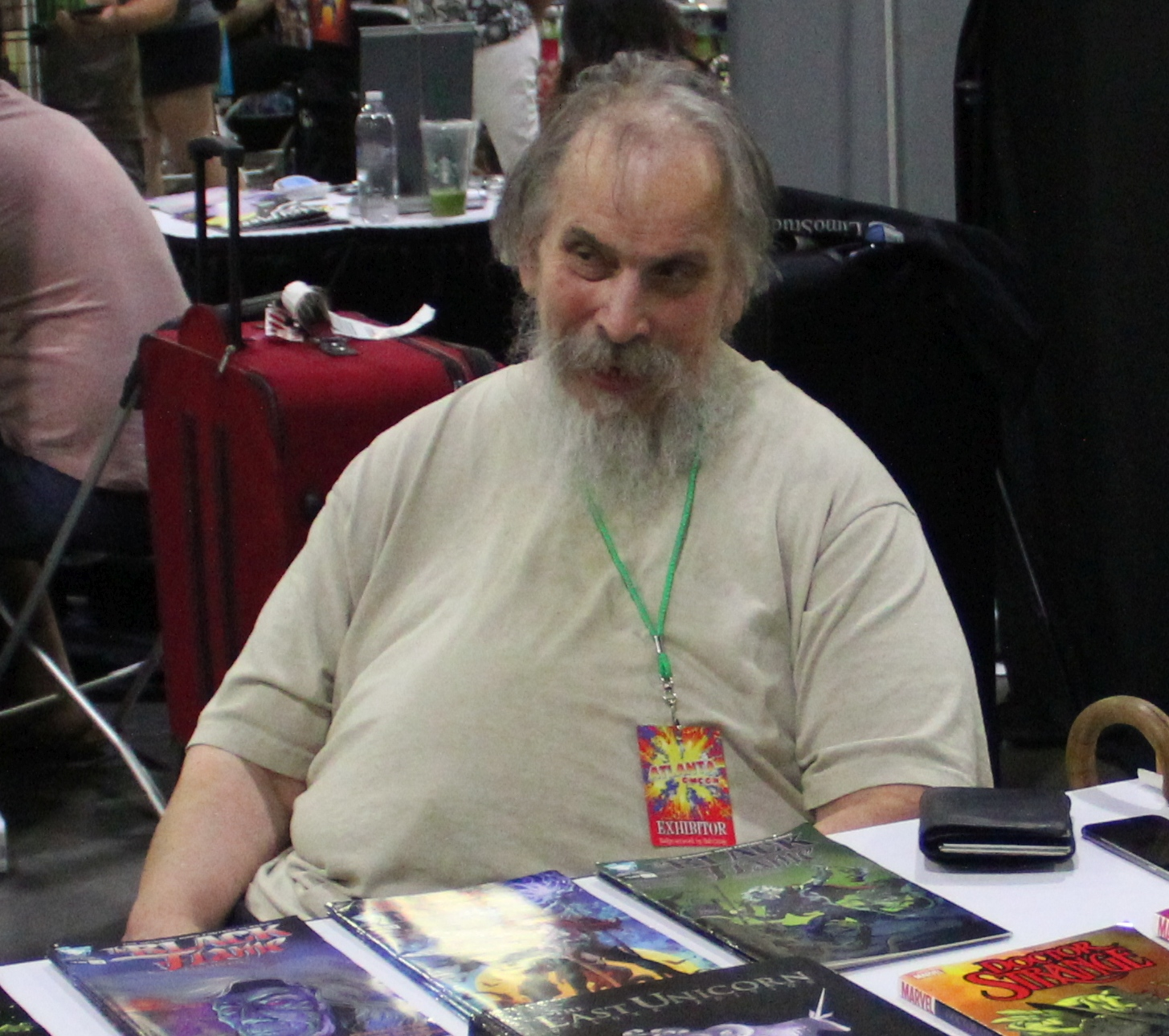
- Gillis in 2018
- Born: Peter B. Gillis; December 19, 1952 White Plains, New York, U.S.
- Died: June 20, 2024 (aged 71) Albany, New York, U.S.
- Area: Writer
- Notable works: Shatter; Warp; Strikeforce: Morituri; Doctor Strange

Peter B. Gillis (December 19, 1952 – June 20, 2024) was an American comic book writer best known for his work at Marvel Comics and First Comics in the 1980s, including the series Strikeforce: Morituri and the digitally drawn comic series Shatter.

== Biography ==
Peter B. Gillis' first work in the comics industry was as a freelance writer for Marvel Comics. His first published comics story was "Saturday Night Furor" in Captain America #224 (Aug. 1978). He then wrote various issues of Marvel Two-in-One, What If...?, and Super-Villain Team-Up from 1978 to 1980. The irregular publishing frequency of the final issues of Super-Villain Team-Up was due to a legal maneuver to prevent DC Comics from trademarking the term "supervillain". Starting in 1980, Gillis then worked as editorial director for the Florida-based publisher New Media Publishing's new line of magazines; he left that position in June 1981.

He is best known for the digital comic Shatter (1985–1988) and First Comics' Warp (1983–1985). Gillis co-created Strikeforce: Morituri (1986–1988) with artist Brent Anderson. Gillis wrote the entire runs of Micronauts: The New Voyages (1984–1986) and Strange Tales vol. 2 (1987–1988); other Marvel work included numerous issues of What If (1980–1984), The Defenders (1984–1986), The Eternals vol. 2 (1985–1986), Doctor Strange vol. 2 #76–81 (1986–1987) and Doctor Strange, Sorcerer Supreme #1–4 (1988–1989). The Defenders was Gillis's first ongoing assignment; he recounted, "I had been working for a while at Marvel, and was constantly pumping for more work, and specifically a series of my own. So when I heard DeMatteis was leaving Defenders, I was in [editor] Carl Potts' office like a shot, and I got the gig."

His creations for other companies include Blaze Barlow and the Eternity Command and the Black Flame for First Comics; and Gammarauders, a tie-in to the Gamma World role-playing game, for DC Comics' short-lived TSR Games line. He also wrote the science-fiction miniseries Tailgunner Jo with art by Tom Artis for DC Comics.

Gillis returned to comics in 2010 when he wrote the six-issue comic adaptation of Peter S. Beagle's The Last Unicorn for IDW Publishing.

Gillis who lived in Earlville, New York, for several years also served on the Earlville Free Library's board. He also served as the library's treasury liaison. Gillis died in Albany, New York, on June 20, 2024, at the age of 71.

== Bibliography ==
=== Comico ===
- Justice Machine #13 (1988)

=== DC Comics ===
- Gammarauders #1–10 (1989)
- Tailgunner Jo #1–6 (1988–1989)
- Teen Titans Spotlight #20 (Cyborg) (1988)

=== First Comics ===
- First Adventures #1–4 (1985–1986)
- Grimjack #7, 31 (1985–1987)
- Jon Sable, Freelance #25 (1985)
- Mars #2–8 (1984)
- Shatter #1–12 (1985–1987)
- Starslayer #20–33 (1984–1985)
- Warp #1–19, Special #1–3 (1983–1985)

=== IDW Publishing ===
- The Last Unicorn #1–6 (2010)

=== Marvel Comics ===
- Avengers Spotlight #21 (1989)
- Bizarre Adventures #30 (1982)
- Black Panther vol. 2 #1–4 (1988)
- Captain America #224, 238–239, 246, Annual #7 (1978–1983)
- The Defenders #131–152 (1984–1986)
- Doctor Strange vol. 2 #74, 76–81 (1985–1987)
- Doctor Strange, Sorcerer Supreme #1–4 (1988–1989)
- Eternals vol. 2 #1–8 (1985–1986)
- Iron Man Annual #5–6 (1982–1983)
- John Carter, Warlord of Mars #28 (1979)
- Marvel Comics Presents #20, 22, 61, 65 (1989–1990)
- Marvel Fanfare #8 (Doctor Strange) (1983)
- Marvel Premiere #54 (Caleb Hammer) (1980)
- Marvel Super-Heroes vol. 2 #3 (1990)
- Marvel Two-in-One #45, 51 (1978–1979)
- Master of Kung Fu #102 (1981)
- Micronauts #59 (1984)
- Micronauts vol. 2 #1–20 (1984–1986)
- Savage Sword of Conan #169 (1990)
- Solo Avengers #16, 18, 20 (1989)
- Strange Tales vol. 2 #1–19 (Doctor Strange) (1987–1988)
- Strikeforce: Morituri #1–20 (1986–1988)
- Super-Villain Team-Up #16–17 (1979–1980)
- Thor Annual #12 (1984)
- The Tomb of Dracula vol. 2 #5 (1980)
- What If...? #18–19, 23, 25, 29–30, 40, 42–47 (1979–1984)
- What If Special #1 (1988)
- What The--?! #1–2, 5–6, 17 (1988–1992)

Preceded by Alan Zelenetz	What If...? writer 1983–1984	Succeeded by n/a
Preceded by John Ostrander	Starslayer writer 1984–1985; With: John Ostrander	Succeeded by John Ostrander
Preceded by J. M. DeMatteis	The Defenders writer 1984–1986	Succeeded by n/a
Preceded by n/a	The Eternals vol. 2 writer 1985–1986	Succeeded by Walt Simonson
Preceded by Roger Stern	Doctor Strange vol. 2 writer 1986–1987	Succeeded by n/a
Preceded by n/a	Strikeforce: Morituri writer 1986–1988	Succeeded by James D. Hudnall
