= Strikeforce: Morituri =

1986-1989 science fiction comic book series

- Strikeforce Morituri, art by Brent Anderson

Publication information
- Publisher: Marvel Comics
- Schedule: Monthly
- Format: Ongoing series
- Genre: , science fiction, superhero
- Publication date: December 1986 – July 1989
- No. of issues: 31
- Main character(s): Jason Edwards; Dan Baker; Yoko Watanabe; Fiona Windsor; Tam Van Ok; Zakir Shastri; Julio Gonzales; Aaron Ray Leonard; Patricia Lynne Sobrero; Clinton Brian Rogers; Bruce Higashi; Woodrow Joshua Green; Carol Rayweick; Macintire Kenlin; Lorna Leigh Raeburn; Harold Carl Everson; Robert Greenbaum; Jelene Anderson; Louis Armanetti; Aline Pagrovna; Pilar Lisieux; William Deguchi; Ruth Mastorakis; Greg Mattingly; Domenica Contreras; Burke O'Halloran; Walther Feyzioglu; Akiya Bandaranaike; John Crenella

Creative team
- Created by: Peter B. Gillis; Brent Anderson
- Written by: Peter B. Gillis
- Artist: Brent Anderson

Strikeforce: Morituri is a science fiction comic book series published by Marvel Comics from 1986 to 1989. The series was created by writer Peter B. Gillis and artist Brent Anderson.

The premise is that aliens have invaded Earth and nearly succeeded in conquering it and stripping it of its resources. A scientist discovers a process which can provide humans with superhuman powers, effectively creating a group of defending superheroes. However, the process would also ensure that the empowered humans would die within a year of being empowered. The series thus focused on the heroism of the main characters in fighting the invaders, while living with the knowledge that their fates were sealed regardless of whether or not they prevailed.

The title comes from the Latin phrase "Ave Imperator, morituri te salutant" ("Hail Caesar, we who are about to die salute you"), a salute that according to popular legend (although not academically agreed) was uttered by Roman gladiators before battle in the arena. The subtitle of the comic was "We who are about to die".

Gillis and Anderson left the series within two years. The series ended after thirty-one issues, while under the tenure of writer James Hudnall and artist Mark Bagley.

Within the Marvel Comics Multiverse, the Strikeforce: Morituri universe is designated as Earth-1287.

== Plot summary ==
In 2069, an alien race called "the Horde" arrived in Earth's solar system (it was later revealed that the actual name of the race was the 'Va-Shaak'). Although they were technologically advanced far beyond humanity at that time, they were extremely savage. Examples of this savagery include the retaliatory slaughter of human slaves (this was shown after the victory of the Black Watch), the nuclear destruction of San Diego (also in response to the Black Watch's assassination of the Earth Commander of the Horde Forces), and the decapitation of children (especially by literally ripping their heads off) in order to establish dominance over newly captured human slaves (one particularly brutal terror-tactic favored by the Horde early in the war was to capture large numbers of humans in order to take them just outside the Earth's atmosphere and then eject them from the ships, allowing them to burn up in re-entry so watchers on the ground could see the streaks representing their burning forms. This tactic became known to humans as 'a Highdive').

It was later discovered that they had stolen their technology from a kindly alien race that visited their planet who were attempting to rescue the Horde species. The Horde had caused severe environmental damage to their planet due to excessive pollution which laid much of the world an uninhabitable wasteland. After pulling the Horde back from the brink of extinction the aliens planned to leave the Horde planet in peace once their rescue mission was accomplished. Before they could leave, however, the alien pacifists were ruthlessly and mercilessly attacked and slaughtered by the Horde. The Horde stole the aliens' ships and advanced technology for themselves and set out into space to establish their savage and war-like empire. The Horde traveled the galaxy in order to steal resources, food, and technologies, since they had no knowledge of how to fix the ships they used. They viewed the Earth and other such planets as a resource to be plundered and discarded once all resources have been used up. If the Horde had wanted to completely conquer mankind, then they could have easily done so. Instead, they satisfied themselves with brutal raids that left the Earth functioning, but reeling under their vicious onslaught. The Padeia Institute, which governed the entire planet at the time, began to organize Earth defenses against these attacks.

Humankind's best hope was discovered in 2072, when Dr. Kimmo Tuolema perfected the Morituri Process. This was a two-step process that allowed people with a specific type of genetic structure to have a new metabolism overlaid on top of their original one, granting them enhanced physical attributes. The second phase of the process would allow for unique superhuman powers. However, there were three mitigating factors inherent in the use of the Morituri Process:

- The process was compatible with very few persons; the estimate was that fewer than 5% of all humans had a compatible physiology for metahuman conversion through the Morituri Process.
- The optimal age for subjects for the Morituri Process was between 18 and 21; older subjects who underwent the process would suffer a significantly reduced lifespan than expected from optimal subjects (measurable in weeks).
- The nature of the energy-based metabolism was such that, within one standard year, the human body would reject it. The rejection of the Morituri metabolism by the human body is 100% fatal. In most cases, the subject's imminent death was indicated by massive upsurges in the subject's power and ability levels.

The first group of test subjects, later known as "the Black Watch", were volunteer soldiers. Of the five members, two died before seeing active service during a power activation exercise in a specialized testing area known as 'Biowar Facility Alpha' (nicknamed 'The Garden'). The remaining three had their first field test in Cape Town, South Africa, taking on Horde forces there; though they were successful in battle, none of them survived (one was killed in battle, another succumbed to the Morituri Effect as they were escaping, and the last was killed with a Hordian nuclear device moments afterward). Commander of the program, Beth Luis Nion, had also secretly undergone the Morituri Process, after starting an affair with a member of the Black Watch, although she kept her powers a secret. Tuolema later deduced that the older the subject, the quicker their system would reject the process – it was at this point that Dr. Tuolema realized recipients between 18 and 21 were the optimal choice regarding maximized life expectancy.

The Morituri Process consisted of two distinct phases: In the first phase, candidates underwent a procedure which granted them an enhanced physicality (in some cases, Morituri gained physically impressive forms), as well as enhanced physical strength and endurance, which made it easier to endure the second phase of the Morituri Process (designed to grant actual metahuman powers). After completing this stage, the volunteers would be placed in 'The Garden', a booby-trapped test facility designed to heighten stress levels and precipitate the emergence of each candidate's powers (Dr. Tuolema based 'The Garden' on the vid-comics his daughter had shown him of the X-Men's Danger Room). In 2073, the first of the new Strikeforce: Morituri entered active service.

The Morituri suffered heavy fatalities during their conflict with the Horde – sometimes from enemy action, but principally through the Morituri Effect, the term given to the body's rejection of artificial metabolism implanted by the Morituri Process. The threat posed by the Horde meant that there was never a shortage of volunteers willing to give up their lives defending mankind. Right from the start, the Morituri showed a propensity for disobeying orders in order to grasp opportunities to attack the enemy; knowing their time was short, they resented being kept out of action for any length of time.

It was the fourth generation of Morituri who saw a real change to the process. The fourth generation was sub-divided into two groups; one was created without the input of Dr. Tuolema, with disastrous results – the volunteers eventually choosing to be euthanized rather than continue in the twisted bodies they ended up with. The fourth generation of Morituri created under Dr. Tuolema's supervision benefited from a major breakthrough; Jason Edwards (a.k.a. Revenge), who had been a captive of the Horde prior to becoming a Morituri, contracted a virus which eventually proved to counter the body's rejection of the Morituri Process. When this was discovered, the surviving Morituri regained a chance to live a full lifespan (too late for the first and second, and all but one of the third generation).

The war with the Horde was unexpectedly brought to a close. A new race of aliens, dubbed the VXX199, entered Earth orbit, destroyed the Horde fleet, and then departed without explanation. Other problems soon arose: the Morituri process being performed on a trio of killers with the intent to assassinate the surviving members of the Strikeforce and the Prime Minister, and the fragmentation of the Paideia back into independent nation-states due to the exposure of the conspiracy (by a high-ranking government minister) to kill the Prime Minister in order to seize power.

== Electric Undertow ==
From December 1989 to March 1990, Marvel published an additional five-issue miniseries, Strikeforce Morituri: Electric Undertow. This took place ten years after the events of the last issue and dealt with the fate of the VXX199. They were waiting behind the Moon, slowly modifying mankind's culture to their requirements, planning to induce spontaneous combustions in the population and then harness the psychic energies released. The four remaining Morituri learned of this, thanks to some bizarre allies (including a sentient A.I. which had taken the holographic form of dead Morituri Scatterbrain, and usually only appeared to and communicated with Scanner; Random – an information specialist/broker with cybernetic neural implants; and Dr. Tuolema's private Morituri squad), and travelled to the VXX-199's base, where they destroyed its CPU, ending this second alien threat.

== Characters ==
=== The Black Watch ===
- Aaron Ray Leonard – died in the Garden before manifestation of powers.
- Patricia Lynne Sobrero – died in the Garden before manifestation of powers.
- Clinton Brian Rogers – Strength; killed by the Horde after killing the First in the Field.
- Bruce Higashi – Speed; supposedly killed in a nuclear strike; Radian was shown someone who resemembled Higashi months later (this person presumably died when the Horde fleet was destroyed).
- Woodrow Joshua Green – Energy Projection (from eyes); died from the Morituri Effect.
- Commander Beth Luis Nion – Nion went through the Morituri process at about the same time as the members of Black Watch. She gained the power to make flowers bloom; died from the Morituri Effect.

=== The First Generation of Morituri ===
- Lorna Leigh Raeburn (Snapdragon) – used wrist mounted projectors to focus her plasma blasts; died from Morituri Effect.
- Harold Carl Everson (Vyking) – Redirect Energy attacks, lifeform detection (referred to as 'imaging'; could detect primarily other Morituri and alien lifeforms); died from Morituri Effect.
- Robert Greenbaum (Marathon) – Strength grew the longer he refrained from using it, charging up as time passed; also carried a defensive shield. Described as a "force of nature" in one book, his ever darkening attitude led to self-mutilation and increasingly aggressive tactics. He willed himself to die from Morituri Effect.
- Jelene Anderson (Adept) – Hyper-invention and hyper-intelligence (limited to physical contact with object to be examined), Chemical Mimicry/Creation (can create objects and organic substances beneficial or harmful to the object analyzed. Was developing cosmic awareness before death due to the 'Morituri Effect'. Anderson was a devout Christian before joining the Morituri; the character is distinct through the series as having a very strong religious feeling. Together with Blackthorn, Adept was one of the favorite characters of series creator Peter B. Gillis, who stated that he "had a real soft spot for Adept, since she was the first fundamentalist Christian character to be portrayed positively".
- Louis Armanetti (Radian) – Full spectrum E-M emissions. Used 'focusing sleeves' on his uniform to concentrate his emissions effectively; killed by Shear for supposedly turning traitor.
- Aline Pagrovna (Blackthorn) – Disrupt molecular bonds, causing things to melt and break; During an encounter with Wildcard (John Crenella) he attempted to copy her powers as he psionically sensed that something was keeping her Morituri Effect in check but he died never realizing that the unknown factor was her pregnancy. Her pregnancy allowed her to live longer than the one-year deadline, although she died from the Morituri Effect shortly after giving birth.

=== The Second Generation of Morituri ===
- Pilar Lisieux (Scaredycat) – Projecting Empathy (limited to fear projection), superhuman speed; died from the Morituri Effect.
- William Deguchi (Scatterbrain) – Telepathy (initially could only use to project to all individuals in a given area and only thoughts; later could project mental states – drunkenness, perfect clarity, etc.). After encounter with the Fourth Generation Morituri telepath, his power began to expand into clairsentience (if not for the 'Morituri Effect' Deguchi may have achieved cosmic awareness). Because of neural damage sustained during training session in The Garden, Deguchi wore a leg brace. Died from the Morituri effect.
- Ruth Mastorakis (Toxyn) – Produce beneficial/harmful biochemical agents capable of affecting organic/inorganic materials and lifeforms, but had to make skin to skin contact to develop a species specific toxin; died from the Morituri Effect.

=== The Third Generation of Morituri ===
- Greg Mattingly (Backhand) – Redirect energy; willed himself to undergo the Morituri Effect to kill the Super Hordians.
- Domenica Contreras (Brava) – Superhuman strength; Former astronomer born in Spain, killed by the Tiger after the Horde War ended.
- Burke O'Halloran (Hardcase) – Density control (limited to enhancing the molecular density of any object to make it nearly indestructible. Could perform this on living beings, but rendered them immobile – and was possibly fatal if they closed their mouths so they could not breathe); killed when the Horde activated a microwave cannon.
- Walther Feyzioglu (Shear) – Could generate "Razor Force" energy waves from hands that could slice through objects on the molecular level with a range of one meter; fell to his death in a fight with Scanner after Shear murdered their Strikeforce commander during a psychotic rage.
- Akiya Bandaranaike (Silencer) – Sound Nullify (could nullify vibratory patterns to inhibit sounds). Also used this power to "silence the hearts" a.k.a. induce fatal heart attacks in members of the Fourth Generation Morituri (as one member was an energy-based being, there was indication that her power was progressing into an EM-controlling ability similar to Radian's); killed when the Horde activated a microwave cannon.
- John Crenella (Wildcard) – Power Mimicry (limited to copying the super powers of other Morituri); Died from the Morituri effect.

=== The Fourth Generation of Morituri (a.k.a. the Morituri Monsters) ===
- 4 members, including Carol Rayweick, Victor Leroy Long and Macintire Kenlin, all were euthanized by Silencer.

Unidentified Morituri #1 – massive psionic powers, including telepathy and psionic energy blasts which he used to enhance Scatterbrain's powers so that the Morituri could gain the upper hand and ultimately defeat their opponents (the Super Hordians) in one particular battle.

Unidentified Morituri #2 – Powers unknown, but appeared to have growth or super-strength.

Unidentified Morituri #3, most likely Carol Rayweick as this was the only noticeable female of this group. Powers unknown, but appeared to have some sort of avian/aquatic growths.

Unidentified Morituri #4 – Powers unknown but energy-related; mutated into an unstable energy form contained in a special shielded area.

=== The Fifth Generation of Morituri ===
- Jason Edwards (Revenge) – Energy conversion – on touch, could cause solid objects to convert into various forms of energy (light, heat, explosive force, etc.). He could control the rate of energy conversion in order to turn objects into explosive charges.
- Dan Baker (Scanner) – Clairsentience (believed at first that he had 'superhuman senses'); He also had a neural jack installed in his head granting him limited Cyberpathic abilities. This allowed him to interface with machines and electronic devices with his mind.
- Yoko Watanabe (Burn) – Pyrokinetic
- Fiona Windsor (Lifter) – Telekinesis, telekinetic flight

=== The Sixth Generation of Morituri (a.k.a. Death Force: Morituri or the Morituri Assassins) ===
- Tam Van Ok (Ghost) – Professional assassin who gained an advanced form of invisibility (he could not be detected by standard human senses or advanced electronic sensory equipment). However, he could be detected by Dan Baker (a.k.a. Scanner) who possessed clairsentience; it was insinuated that he was detectable by other psi-sensory powers like telepathy. He was sent to assassinate Dr. Tuolema, but decided to abort the mission when he discovered his employers had lied and betrayed him; whereabouts unknown.
- Zakir Shastri (Tiger) – Mercenary who could generate energy claws around his hands capable of slicing through objects through molecular disruption. He was sent to assassinate Brava which he accomplished fairly easily. Returned to India after discovering his employers had lied and betrayed him.
- Julio Diego Gonzales a.k.a. Red Cougar (Wind) – A serial killer who gained supersonic speed; after completing his mission in assassinating the Prime Minister of the Paideia, then going on a murderous rampage at the military facility where the PM was kept, he was killed by Revenge.

=== The Seventh Generation of Morituri (a.k.a. the Alien controlled Morituri or Morituri Clones) ===
- Zed – Energy projection; killed by Szell's Army
- Hassan – Freezing ability; killed by Lifter
- Olga – Possessing Telepathic and other psionic abilities she used to attack the Morituri; killed by Szell's Army
- Several unnamed members that possess a variety of energy-based and physical powers; killed either by Strikeforce: Morituri or Szell's Army
  - NOTE: The Morituri Clones were just that; clones who, at the moment of death, had their consciousness transferred into new bodies.

=== The Eighth Generation of Morituri (a.k.a. Kimmo Tuolema's Morituri) ===
- Paula Tuolema (the comic book also gives a first name as Laura which is most likely a misprint) – teleportation. In the comic book she was able to remotely teleport others. It was shown that she was able to teleport the 4 surviving Morituri, who were far away, to her location. It is also possible that she was capable of teleporting people and items away from her. However, in the comic book, she was seen teleporting with the Morituri to their destination.
- Hans – unclarified physical powers

This series was unique in that it did not have a set "roster" such as the X-Men, the Avengers or the Justice League of America. With members dying routinely, the mixing of generations was gradual and tragic. Several issues feature the last of a previous generation mixing with the new guard.

== Continuity ==
The setting of Strikeforce: Morituri is a continuity of its own and resembles no future seen in any other Marvel title. The Horde appear to have gathered trophies from residents of the Marvel Universe, including Captain America's Shield, the Silver Surfer's board and Galactus's helmet, as well as shelves of what appear to be power batteries used by DC Comics' Green Lantern Corps.

In 2014, Marvel's X-Force referred to scientists from the mainstream Marvel universe who reached the "Strikeforce: Morituri" universe and stole the Morituri Process technology used to create their superhumans.

== Creators ==
=== Writers ===
- James Hudnall – Strikeforce: Morituri #21–31 (September 1988 – July 1989); Strikeforce Morituri: Electric Undertow #1–5 (December 1989 – March 1990)
- Peter B. Gillis – Strikeforce: Morituri #1–20 (December 1986 – July 1988)

=== Art ===
- Brent Anderson – Strikeforce: Morituri #1–9, 11–15, 17–20 (December 1986 – August 1987, October 1987 – February 1988, April 1988 – July 1988)
- Huw Thomas– Strikeforce: Morituri #21 (September 1988)
- John Calimee – Strikeforce: Morituri #22, 24–25 (October 1988, December 1988 – January 1989)
- Mark Bagley – Strikeforce: Morituri #23, 26–31 (November 1988, February 1989 – July 1989); Strikeforce Morituri: Electric Undertow #1–5 (December 1989 – March 1990)
- Whilce Portacio – Strikeforce: Morituri #10, 16 (September 1987, March 1988)

== Reprints ==
Strikeforce: Morituri is being reprinted in Trade Paperback Format by Marvel comics during 2012:

- Volume 1 Released 25 January 2012 Collects Strikeforce: Morituri issues 1–13 ISBN 978-0-7851-6471-5
- Volume 2 Released 22 February 2012 Collects Strikeforce: Morituri issues 14–26 ISBN 978-0-7851-6473-9
- Volume 3 Released 06 June 2012 Collects Strikeforce: Morituri issues 27–31 and Strikeforce: Morituri — Electric Undertow 1–5 ISBN 978-0-7851-6474-6

Additionally in January 2012 Marvel released Strikeforce: Morituri – We Who Are About To Die #1, reprinting issue 1 of Strikeforce: Morituri.

== In other media ==
=== Television ===
- In 2003, the Sci Fi Channel announced it was developing 1000 Days, a live-action television film and backdoor pilot, based on Strikeforce: Morituri, in which near-future soldiers gain enhanced abilities but die 1,000 days later. Written by Art Marcum and Matt Holloway, it was a Reveille Productions and Marvel Studios co-production executive produced by Reveille head Ben Silverman and Marvel Studios' Avi Arad and Rick Ungar.

=== Film ===
- Waterman Entertainment purchased film options to the series from Peter Gillis, with the initial plan being to start production in December 2011. Gillis and Connor Cochran were writing the adaptation's script with Jeff Beard as producer. Waterman planned to get Marvel's rights also without success. Soon, Marvel began filing trademarks for the property then issued a reprint trade paperback. After Waterman Entertainment closed on November 24, 2015, the project was terminated.
