= Big K (magazine) =

1980s British computer magazine

- Issue #1, April 1984
- Editor: Tony Tyler
- Categories: Video game magazines
- Frequency: Monthly
- First issue: April 1984
- Final issue Number: March 1985; 12
- Company: IPC Magazines Ltd
- Country: United Kingdom
- Based in: London
- Language: English
- ISSN: 0266-5492

Big K was a short-lived multi format magazine published by IPC Magazines Ltd during the 1980s. The design of the magazine was very similar in style to their comic strip publications at the time, 2000 AD and Roy of the Rovers and seemed to be aimed at the younger computer user. Listings were provided for VIC-20, Commodore 64, Oric, Dragon 32/64, ZX81, ZX Spectrum, and BBC Micro.

The March 1985 final issue included the first episode of the digitally created comic strip Shatter.

== See also ==
- ACE
- Computer and Video Games
- Edge
- GamesMaster
- The Games Machine
