= Gordon Purcell =

American comics artist (born 1959)

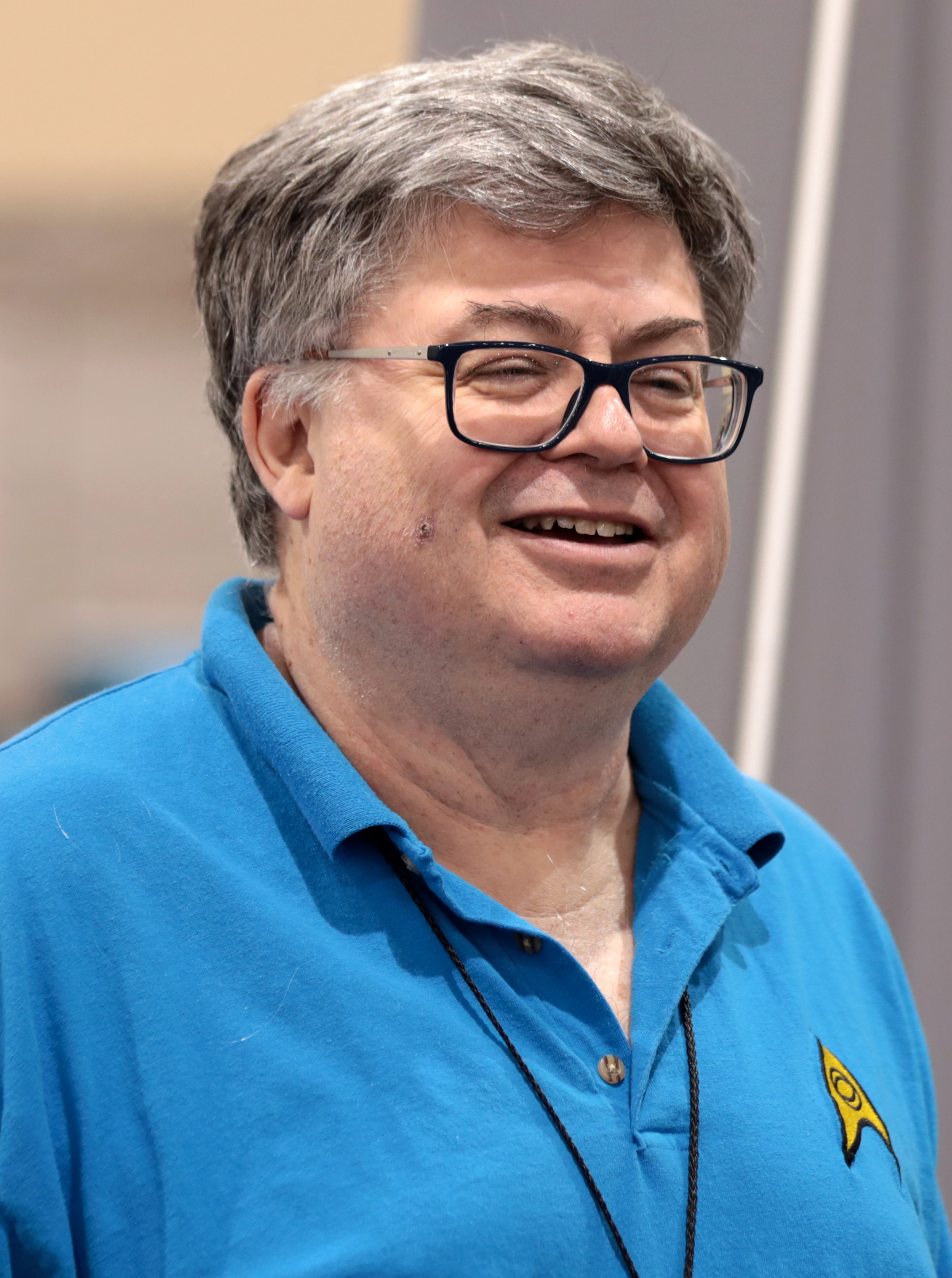
- Purcell in 2019
- Born: Gordon Purcell; February 14, 1959 (age 67) Lansing, Michigan, U.S.
- Area: Penciler
- Notable works: Star Trek; Star Trek: The Next Generation

Gordon Purcell (born February 14, 1959) is an American comics artist, perhaps best known for his Star Trek work, in particular his realistic renditions of the actors who play that franchise's characters, as well as those of similarly licensed comic books, such as The X-Files, Xena: Warrior Princess, Lost in Space, Godzilla, The Young Indiana Jones Chronicles, Barb Wire, and The Terminator.

== Early life ==
Born in Lansing, Michigan, Purcell grew up reading Marvel Comics and DC Comics, and his love of drawing was sparked by watching cartoons of Spider-Man and Batman. The first comic book he read was a Disney comic book. He graduated from the University of Minnesota with Bachelor's degrees in Studio Arts and Theater Arts.

== Career ==
Cover to Star Trek vol. 2 #30 (April 1992) pencilled by Gordon Purcell and inked by Jerome K. Moore

Among Purcell's first work for DC Comics was a Doctor Light story published as a Bonus Book in The Flash #12 (May 1988). He has worked on numerous comic books, including Star Trek, Star Trek: The Next Generation, Star Trek: Deep Space Nine, Star Trek: Voyager, Soulsearchers and Company, Flare, The Flash, Fantastic Four, Superman, Wonder Man, Hulk vs. Nova, Moon Knight, What If...?, Race Warriors, Kolchak: The Night Stalker, Justice League, Ben 10, and Elvira. Purcell drew Star Trek: Year Four for IDW, written by Trek story editor D. C. Fontana, and Star Trek: The Last Generation, written by Andrew Steven Harris. He has worked on The Phantom for Moonstone and Beyond the Wall (Roman soldiers vs. monsters and barbarians) for IDW. Purcell drew the DC Retroactive: Justice League - The '70s one-shot in 2011.

Purcell claims not to have a favorite company to work for but is attracted to projects based on the editor and other creators involved with them. He calls his work on Silver Sable as a project he particularly enjoyed, saying he feels that the book was "really going somewhere" by the end of his run. Purcell cites his work on Gammarauders, stating that having to ink his own pencils taught him a lot about what information he needed to give to his future inkers. Purcell also cites his Star Trek work because he was allowed to visit the sets of those shows, which were among his favorites.

== In other media ==
Purcell appeared on the October 19, 2005 episode of the game show Who Wants to Be a Millionaire? Having had only two hours of sleep, he won $50,000 and decided to quit when he could not answer the question of which U.S. state signed a 1790 treaty under the threat of being declared a foreign nation. The answer was "Rhode Island".

On May 24, 2010, Purcell appeared on Jeopardy! and finished in third place.

On January 21, 2014, Purcell won a trip to Florida in the daily trivia contest that is part of TV's Live With Kelly and Michael.

On January 25, 2019, Purcell again won a trip, this time to Antigua, in the daily trivia contest that is part of TV's Live With Kelly and Ryan.

On March 18, 2025, Purcell again won a trip, again to Antigua, in the daily trivia contest that is part of TV's Live With Kelly and Mark.

== Personal life ==
Purcell resides in Plymouth, Minnesota. He is not related to fellow comics-creators Steve Purcell or the late Howard Purcell.

== Bibliography ==
=== DC Comics ===
- Aquaman vol. 4 #70 (2000)
- The Batman Chronicles #22 (2000)
- Cartoon Network Action Pack #26 (2008)
- Chuck #4 (2008)
- Crisis Aftermath: The Battle for Blüdhaven #5 (2006)
- DC Retroactive: JLA – The '70s #1 (2011)
- DCU Holiday Bash #3 (1999)
- The Flash vol. 2 #12 (Doctor Light Bonus Book insert); #23 (1988–1989)
- Gammarauders #4, 7–8, 10 (1989)
- JLA Showcase 80-Page Giant #1 (2000)
- JSA: Classified #27 (2007)
- Justice League Unlimited #19, 34, 39 (2006–2008)
- The New Teen Titans Annual vol. 2 #4 (1988)
- Robin #70, 72 (1999–2000)
- Snakes on a Plane #1 (2006)
- Spectre Annual #1 (1988)
- Star Trek #53–54 (1988)
- Star Trek vol. 2 #12–16, 19–26, 30–33, 37–38, 40, 42–44, Annual #4 (1990–1993)
- Star Trek Generations #1 (1995)
- Star Trek Special #1 (2001)
- Star Trek VI: The Undiscovered Country #1 (1992)
- Star Trek: The Next Generation vol. 2 #7–8, 71–75, 77–80, Annual #1, Special #2 (1990–1996)
- Star Trek: The Next Generation/Star Trek: Deep Space Nine #1–2 (1994–1995)
- Superman 80-Page Giant #2 (1999)
- Team Titans #11 (1993)
- War of the Gods #4 (1991)

==== Paradox Press ====
- The Big Book of Bad (1998)
- The Big Book of Hoaxes (1996)
- The Big Book of Losers (1997)
- The Big Book of Martyrs (1997)
- The Big Book of the Unexplained (1997)
- The Big Book of the Weird Wild West (1998)
- The Big Book of Thugs (1996)
- The Big Book of Urban Legends (1994)
- The Big Book of Vice (1999)

=== First Comics ===
- Grimjack #39 (1987)

=== Heroic Publishing ===
- Flare #7 (1991)
- Flare vol. 2 #1–2, 28–29 (2004–2005)
- League of Champions #7 (1992)
- Witchgirls Inc. #5 (2007)

=== IDW Publishing ===
- Ben 10 #2 (2013)
- Star Trek Year Four: Enterprise Experiment #1, 3 (2008)
- Star Trek: The Next Generation / Doctor Who: Assimilation² #5–8 (2012)
- Star Trek: Year Four #3 (2007)

=== Image Comics ===
- Action Planet Comics #3 (1997)
- Protectors, Inc. #1, 5–6 (2013–2014)

=== Malibu Comics ===
- Prototype #0 (1994)
- Star Trek: Deep Space Nine #1–2, 4–5, 8–9 (1993–1994)
- Star Trek: Deep Space Nine/Star Trek: The Next Generation #1–2 (1994)

=== Marvel Comics ===
- Avengers #362 (1993)
- Cage #11 (1993)
- Mad-Dog #1–6 (1993)
- Silver Sable and the Wild Pack #24, 27–29, 31, 33–35 (1994–1995)
- What If...? vol. 2 #58 (1994)
- Wonder Man #12, Annual #2 (1992–1993)

=== Moonstone Books ===
- Kolchak: The Night Stalker #1 (2002)

=== Topps Comics ===
- The X-Files #17, 20–21, 24–29 (1996–1997)
- The X-Files: Ground Zero #1–4 (1997–1998)

Preceded by James W. Fry	Star Trek penciller 1990–1993	Succeeded by Robert Davis
Preceded by Deryl Skelton	Star Trek: The Next Generation penciller 1995–1996	Succeeded by n/a
