= Denis Rodier =

Canadian comics illustrator and painter (b. 1963)

- Born: 1963 (age 62–63) Canada
- Areas: Artist, Inker, Colourist
- Notable works: Action Comics, The Demon

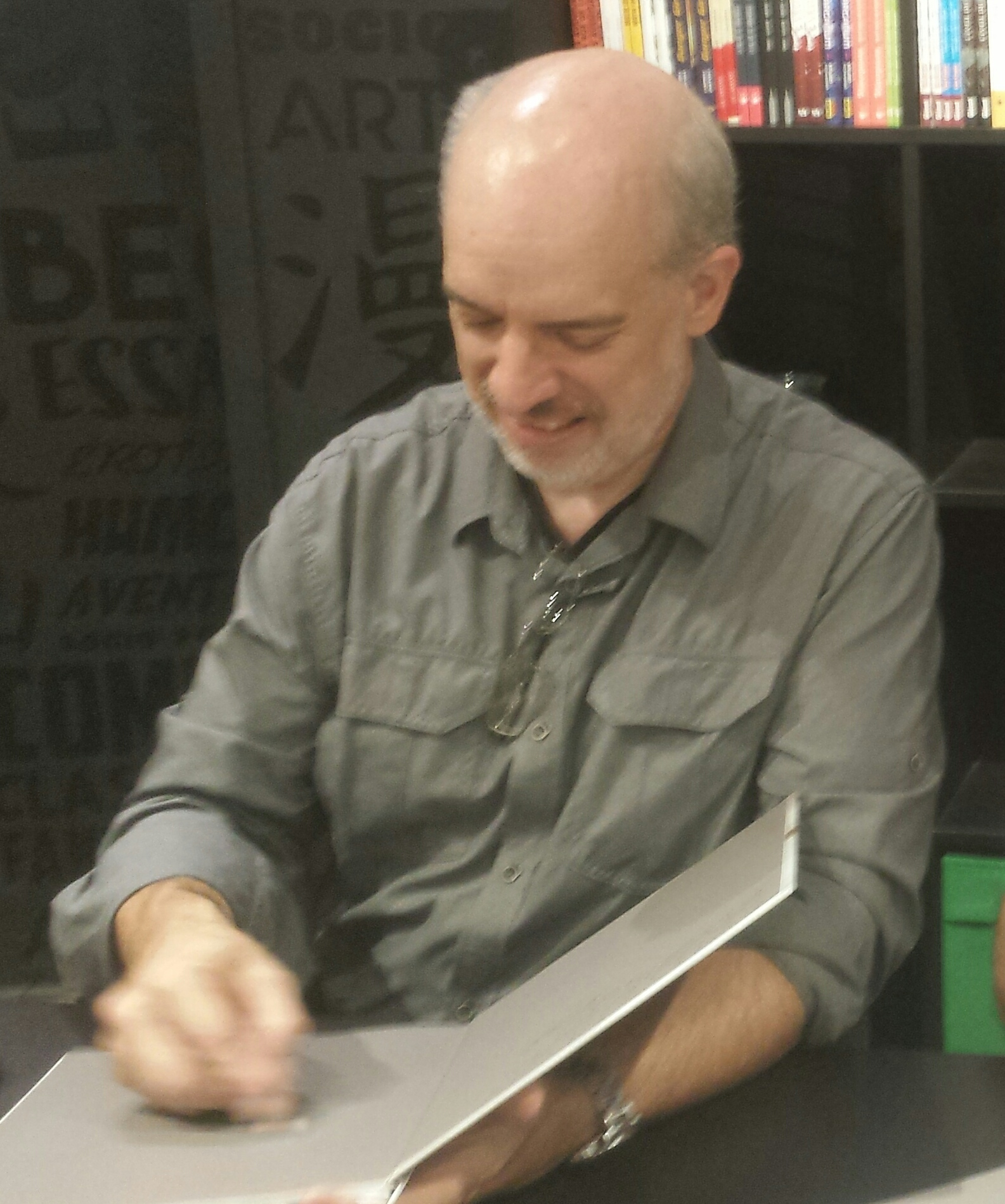
Denis Rodier photographed in Montréal, Québec, Canada inside the bookstore Planète BD

Denis Rodier (born 1963) is a comic book illustrator; he has worked for multiple companies including DC Comics, Milestone Media, and Marvel Comics.

In 1986, Denis Rodier began a career as an illustrator which would transform him, two years later, into a comic book artist. Among his first work for DC Comics was a Batman story published as a Bonus Book in Detective Comics #589 (August 1988). Rodier has worked on such world-famous characters as Batman, Captain America and Wonder Woman. It was his work on Superman that garnered Rodier his greatest acclaim, especially on the award-winning "The Death of Superman" story arc.

As a painter, his work has been seen in such publications as the illustration compilation ARZACH MADE IN U.S.A.; Shoes for Amelie a picture book which received the McNally Robinson Book for Young People Award; and covers for The Demon (another comic title), Newstime Magazine and many others. Rodier made frequent contributions to SAFARIR as well as freelance work for such clients as Tony Levin (Peter Gabriel's band), Pat Mastelotto (King Crimson) and Suzanne Vega.

He lives in Quebec's Laurentian region, where he paints, draws comics for the French market and plays music.
