= DC Comics Bonus Book =

DC Comics Bonus Books were 16-page comic book stories inserted into issues of existing DC Comics series to showcase new writers and artists. Running from April 1988 to February 1989, they consisted of a front cover, 14 pages of story, and a back cover with a brief biography of the story's creators. The addition of the insert did not entail an increase in the price of the comic book. The Bonus Books featured early work by such comics creators as Mark Askwith, Jim Balent, Randy DuBurke, Dean Haspiel, Rob Liefeld, Gordon Purcell, and Denis Rodier.

== Issues ==
Issue (cover date)	Bonus Book	Writer(s)	Artist(s)	Citations
Action Comics #599 (April 1988)	Superman and Jimmy Olsen	Joe Calchi	Britt Wisenbaker and James Scott	
The Flash vol. 2 #12 (May 1988)	Doctor Light	George Broderick	Gordon Purcell and Timothy Dzon	
Doom Patrol vol. 2 #9 (June 1988)	Celsius	Steve Miller	Randy DuBurke and Joe Alidetta	
Wonder Woman vol. 2 #18 (July 1988)	Amazons	Dan Littleford	Palmer Worley and Brian Thomas	
Detective Comics #589 (August 1988)	Batman vs. Poison Ivy	Lewis Klahr and Steve Piersall	Dean Haspiel and Denis Rodier	
The Warlord #131 (September 1988)	Jennifer Morgan	Steve Wilson	Rob Liefeld and Jeff Albrecht	
Justice League International #18 (October 1988)	Mister Miracle, Big Barda, and Oberon	Mark Askwith	James Webb and Mark Pennington	
Power of the Atom #4 (November 1988)	Atom	Joe Calchi	Jim Balent and Dan Schaefer	
The Flash vol. 2 #19 (December 1988)	Blue Trinity	Hank Kanalz	Bill Knapp and Jerry Acerno	
Suicide Squad #21 (Winter 1988)	Bronze Tiger	Larry Ganem	Peter Krause and Fred Butler	
Detective Comics #595 (Holiday 1989)	Batman vs. Mr. Freeze	Jeff O'Hare	Roderick Delgado and Jerry Acerno	
Wonder Woman vol. 2 #26 (January 1989)	Amazons	Tom Joyner	Neil Vokes and Fred Butler	
Justice League International #24 (February 1989)	Blue Beetle, Booster Gold, and Maxwell Lord	David P. Levin	Dean Haspiel	

== See also ==
- DC Comics insert previews
