= Star Trek (DC Comics) =

Publication information
- Publisher: DC Comics
Star Trek
Publication information
- Schedule: Monthly
- Format: Ongoing series
- Genre: Science fiction
- Publication date: Feb. 1984 – Feb. 1996
- No. of issues: (vol. 1): 56 & 3 annuals (vol. 2): 80 & 6 annuals
- Main character(s): James T. Kirk; Spock; Dr. Leonard "Bones" McCoy; Montgomery "Scotty" Scott; Nyota Uhura; Hikaru Sulu; Pavel Chekov
Creative team
- Written by: (vol. 1); Mike W. Barr, Len Wein, Mike Carlin, Peter David (vol. 2); Peter David, Howard Weinstein, Kevin J. Ryan
- Penciller(s): (vol. 1); Tom Sutton (vol. 2); James W. Fry, Gordon Purcell, Rod Whigham, Rachel Ketchum
- Inker(s): (vol. 1); Ricardo Villagrán (vol. 2); Arne Starr

From February 1984 through February 1996, DC Comics held the license to publish comic books based upon the Star Trek franchise, namely Star Trek: The Original Series (TOS) and Star Trek: The Next Generation (TNG).

The main DC Comics Star Trek title was published in two series, comprising 136 issues, 9 annuals, and a number of special issues. Two series were also published based upon Star Trek: The Next Generation, plus several mini-series that linked TOS and TNG.

== Publication history ==
=== Vol. 1 ===
Volume one was published from February 1984–Nov. 1988. It featured stories set after Star Trek II: The Wrath of Khan. Consequently, these are the only notable Star Trek: The Original Series stories to not feature the character of Spock.

In addition to the Star Trek original cast, original characters in this series included the bigoted Native American Ensign William Bearclaw, Ensign Nancy Bryce, the bird-like Dr. Chu-Sa, Lt. Commander Maria Morelli, Ensign Elizabeth Sherwood, and the Klingons Konom and Bernie. There were also appearances by Arex and M'Ress, previously seen in Star Trek: The Animated Series.

Issue	Title	Writer(s)	Pencils	Inks	Notes
v1 #1 (2/84)	"The Wormhole Connection"	Mike W. Barr	Tom Sutton	Ricardo Villagran	George Pérez cover. Koloth appearance. First appearances of Bearclaw, Bryce, Konom, and Sherwood.
v1 #2 (3/84)	"The Only Good Klingon..."	Mike W. Barr	Tom Sutton	Ricardo Villagran	George Pérez cover; Koloth appearance
v1 #3 (4/84)	"Errand of War!"	Mike W. Barr	Tom Sutton	Ricardo Villagran	George Pérez cover; Kor, Excalbians appearances
v1 #4 (5/84)	"Deadly Allies!"	Mike W. Barr	Tom Sutton	Ricardo Villagran	Excalbians & Organians appearances
v1 #5 (6/84)	"Mortal Gods"	Mike W. Barr	Tom Sutton	Sal Amendola	Robert Fox appearance
v1 #6 (7/84)	"Who Is... Enigma?"	Mike W. Barr	Tom Sutton	Ricardo Villagran	
v1 #7 (8/84)	"Pon Far!" (sic)	Mike W. Barr	Eduardo Barreto	Ricardo Villagran	Origin of Saavik; David Marcus, Sarek, Amanda Grayson appearances
v1 #8 (11/84)	"Blood Fever"	Mike W. Barr	Tom Sutton	Ricardo Villagran	David Marcus, Xon
v1 #9 (12/84)	"New Frontiers Chapter 1: ...Promises to Keep"	Mike W. Barr	Tom Sutton	Ricardo Villagran	Stories set after Star Trek III: The Search for Spock begin; start of a Mirror Universe story; Sarek, Amanda, Captain Styles, Carol Marcus; wake for David Marcus
v1 #10 (1/85)	"New Frontiers Chapter 2: Double Image"	Mike W. Barr	Tom Sutton	Ricardo Villagran	Mirror Universe; Sarek, Amanda, Captain Styles, Carol Marcus
v1 #11 (2/85)	"New Frontiers Chapter 3: Deadly Reflection!"	Mike W. Barr	Tom Sutton	Ricardo Villagran	Mirror Universe; Sarek, Amanda, Captain Styles, Carol Marcus
v1 #12 (3/85)	"New Frontiers Chapter 4: The Tantalus Trap!"	Mike W. Barr	Tom Sutton	Ricardo Villagran	Mirror Universe
v1 #13 (4/85)	"New Frontiers Chapter 5: Masquerade!"	Mike W. Barr	Tom Sutton	Ricardo Villagran	Mirror Universe
v1 #14 (5/85)	"New Frontiers Chapter 6: Behind Enemy Lines!"	Mike W. Barr	Tom Sutton	Ricardo Villagran	Mirror Universe
v1 #15 (6/85)	"New Frontiers Chapter 7: The Beginning of the End..."	Mike W. Barr	Tom Sutton	Ricardo Villagran	Mirror Universe
v1 #16 (7/85)	"New Frontiers Chapter 8: Homecoming..."	Mike W. Barr	Tom Sutton	Ricardo Villagran	Mirror Universe; Styles, Carol Marcus. Kirk assigned USS Excelsior, Spock assigned to command of USS Surak. First appearance of Brinks.
v1 #17 (8/85)	"The D'Artagnan Three"	L. B. Kellogg	Tom Sutton	Ricardo Villagran	Uhura backstory, old flame, Kabaka Buganda. Called "Nyota"
v1 #18 (9/85)	"Rest and Recreation!"	Paul Kupperberg	Tom Sutton	Ricardo Villagran	Scotty solo adventure, set on Starbase VII
v1 #19 (10/85)	"Chekov's Choice"	Walter Koenig	Dan Spiegle		Between Star Trek: The Motion Picture and Star Trek II: The Wrath of Khan
v1 #20 (11/85)	"Giri"	Wenonah Woods	Tom Sutton	Ricardo Villagran	Sulu's uncle Kiyomori Hatoyama and wedding of cousin Keiko Hatoyama
v1 #21 (12/85)	"Dreamworld"	Bob Rozakis	Tom Sutton	Ricardo Villagran	First story set on the Surak; first appearances of Chu-Sa and McCarthy.
v1 #22 (1/86)	"Wolf on the Prowl"	Tony Isabella	Tom Sutton	Ricardo Villagran	Sequel to "Wolf in the Fold"
v1 #23 (2/86)	"Wolf at the Door"	Tony Isabella	Tom Sutton	Ricardo Villagran	Sequel to "Wolf in the Fold"
v1 #24 (3/86)	"Double Blind, Part I"	Diane Duane	Tom Sutton	Ricardo Villagran	Comic debuts of Pocket Books novel characters, Naraht the Horta, Harb Tanzer and Janice Kerasus.
v1 #25 (4/86)	"Double Blind, Part II"	Diane Duane	Tom Sutton	Ricardo Villagran	
v1 #26 (5/86)	"The Trouble With Transporters!"	Bob Rozakis	Tom Sutton	Ricardo Villagran	Second story set on the Surak; first appearances of Garace and Mello.
v1 #27 (6/86)	"Around the Clock"	Robert Greenberger	Tom Sutton	Ricardo Villagran	First appearance of Morelli.
v1 #28 (7/86)	"The Last Word"	Diane Duane	Gray Morrow		McCoy story written by a registered nurse. Comic debuts of Pocket Books novel original characters, Lia Burke and Dr Tom Krejci. Referenced are Athende the Sulamid and Avoca.
v1 #29 (8/86)	"The Trouble With Bearclaw"	Tony Isabella	Tom Sutton	Ricardo Villagran	
v1 #30 (9/86)	"Uhura's Story"	Paul Kupperberg	Carmine Infantino	Ricardo Villagran	Flashback to 5-year mission; Uhura's given name stated as "Nyota"
v1 #31 (10/86)	"Maggie's World!"	Tony Isabella & Len Wein	Tom Sutton	Ricardo Villagran	Koloth
v1 #32 (11/86)	"Judgment Day!"	Len Wein	Tom Sutton	Ricardo Villagran	Koloth
v1 #33 (12/86)	"Vicious Circle!"	Len Wein	Tom Sutton	Ricardo Villagran	Sequel to "Tomorrow is Yesterday"; TOS Enterprise meets movie-era Enterprise; issue timed to coincide with the 20th anniversary of Star Trek in September 1986
v1 #34 (1/87)	"The Doomsday Bug! Chapter I: Death Ship!"	Len Wein	Tom Sutton	Ricardo Villagran	USS Surak destroyed. Cartwright appearance
v1 #35 (2/87)	"The Doomsday Bug! Chapter II: Stand-Off!"	Len Wein	Gray Morrow		Styles appearance
v1 #36 (3/87)	"The Doomsday Bug! Chapter III: The Apocalypse Scenario!"	Len Wein	Gray Morrow		Styles retakes USS Excelsior; "reset button" pressed to restore the crew's situation to effectively its status at the end of Star Trek III
v1 #37 (4/87)	"Choices!"	Len Wein	Curt Swan	Pablo Marcos	Stories set immediately after Star Trek IV: The Voyage Home begin, aboard the Enterprise-A; Arex and M'Ress join the crew
v1 #38 (5/87)	"The Argon Affair!"	Michael Fleisher	Adam Kubert	Ricardo Villagran	During 5-year mission
v1 #39 (6/87)	"When You Wish Upon a Star...!"	Len Wein	Tom Sutton	Ricardo Villagran	Harry Mudd
v1 #40 (7/87)	"Mudd's Magic!"	Len Wein	Tom Sutton	Ricardo Villagran	Harry Mudd
v1 #41 (8/87)	"What Goes Around..."	Michael Carlin	Tom Sutton	Ricardo Villagran	Orions
v1 #42 (9/87)	"The Corbomite Effect!"	Michael Carlin	Tom Sutton	Ricardo Villagran	President Hiram Roth appearance
v1 #43 (10/87)	"Paradise Lost!, Part I: Return of the Serpent"	Michael Carlin	Tom Sutton	Ricardo Villagran	Sequel to "The Apple"
v1 #44 (11/87)	"Paradise Lost!, Part II: Past Perfect"	Michael Carlin	Tom Sutton	Ricardo Villagran	Sequel to "The Apple"
v1 #45 (12/87)	"Paradise Lost!, Part III: Devil Down Below!"	Michael Carlin	Tom Sutton	Ricardo Villagran	Sequel to "The Apple"
v1 #46 (1/88)	"Getaway"	Michael Carlin	Tom Sutton	Ricardo Villagran	
v1 #47 (2/88)	"Idol Threats"	Michael Carlin	Tom Sutton	Ricardo Villagran	
v1 #48 (3/88)	"The Stars in Secret Influence"	Peter David	Tom Sutton	Ricardo Villagran	Konom's bachelor party; first appearance of Bernie
v1 #49 (4/88)	"Aspiring to Be Angels"	Peter David	Tom Sutton	Ricardo Villagran	
v1 #50 (5/88)	"Marriage of Inconvenience"	Peter David	Tom Sutton	Ricardo Villagran	Wedding of Konom and Nancy; Hiram Roth, Klingon Ambassador appearances. First appearances of Castille, Bloemker, and Sterno.
v1 #51 (6/88)	"Haunted Honeymoon"	Peter David	Tom Sutton	Ricardo Villagran	Characters from comic strip Bloom County appear in one panel as part of a hallucination
v1 #52 (7/88)	"Hell in a Handbasket"	Peter David	Tom Sutton	Ricardo Villagran	Telepathic re-creation of Hell as depicted in The Divine Comedy
v1 #53 (8/88)	"You're Dead, Jim"	Peter David	Gordon Purcell	Ricardo Villagran	
v1 #54 (9/88)	"Old Loyalties"	Peter David	Gordon Purcell	Ricardo Villagran	Finnegan appearance
v1 #55 (10/88)	"Finnegan's Wake!"	Peter David	Tom Sutton	Ricardo Villagran	Finnegan, Garth of Izar appearances
v1 #56 (11/88)	"A Small Matter of Faith"	Martin Pasko	Gray Morrow		During 5-year mission; not known at time of publication that this would be the final issue

==== Vol. 1 Annuals ====
Issue	Title	Writer(s)	Pencils	Inks	Notes
v1 Annual #1 (1985)	"All Those Years Ago..."	Mike W. Barr	David Ross	Bob Smith	1st mission of the 5-year mission; appearance of Christopher Pike and Number One.
v1 Annual #2 (1986)	"The Final Voyage"	Mike W. Barr	Dan Jurgens	Bob Smith	Final mission of the 5-year mission; appearance of Willard Decker and the Talosians.
v1 Annual #3 (1988)	"Retrospect"	Peter David	Curt Swan	Ricardo Villagran	Death of Scotty's wife; funeral of Peter Preston.

==== Vol. 1 Movie adaptations ====
Issue	Title	Writer(s)	Pencils	Inks	Notes
v1 Star Trek III (1984)	"The Search for Spock"	Mike W. Barr	Tom Sutton	Ricardo Villagran	Adaptation of the 1984 film.
v1 Star Trek IV (1987)	"The Voyage Home"	Mike W. Barr	Tom Sutton	Ricardo Villagran	Adaptation of the 1986 film.
v1 Star Trek V (1989)	"The Final Frontier"	Peter David	James W. Fry	Arne Starr	Adaptation of the 1989 film.

=== Vol. 2 ===
Star Trek volume 2 was published from Oct. 1989 – Feb. 1996. It featured stories set after Star Trek V: The Final Frontier.

Issue	Title	Writer(s)	Pencils	Inks	Notes
v2 #1 (10/89)	"The Return!"	Peter David	James W. Fry	Arne Starr	Hiram Roth, Klingon Ambassador appearances. First appearances of M'yra, Fouton, Tuchinsky, and the Nasgul.
v2 #2 (11/89)	"The Sentence"	Peter David	James W. Fry	Arne Starr	Hiram Roth, Klingon Ambassador, Klaa appearances. First appearance of Kathy Li.
v2 #3 (12/89)	"Death Before Dishonor"	Peter David	James W. Fry	Arne Starr	Klaa
v2 #4 (1/90)	"Repercussions"	Peter David	James W. Fry	Arne Starr	Hiram Roth, Klingon Ambassador appearances. First appearance of R.J. Blaise
v2 #5 (2/90)	"Fast Friends"	Peter David	James W. Fry	Arne Starr	Hiram Roth. First appearance of Tomlinson.
v2 #6 (3/90)	"Cure All"	Peter David	James W. Fry	Arne Starr	Hiram Roth, Klingon Ambassador appearances.
v2 #7 (4/90)	"Not... Sweeney!"	Peter David	James W. Fry	Arne Starr	Hiram Roth, Klingon Ambassador appearances.
v2 #8 (5/90)	"Going, Going..."	Peter David	James W. Fry	Arne Starr	Hiram Roth, Klingon Ambassador, Klaa appearances.
v2 #9 (6/90)	"...Gone!"	Peter David	James W. Fry	Arne Starr	Hiram Roth, Klingon Ambassador, Klaa, Nogura appearances.
v2 #10 (7/90)	"The Trial of James T. Kirk, Part I: The First Thing We Do..."	Peter David	James W. Fry	Arne Starr	Hiram Roth, Klingon Ambassador, Sarek, Samuel Cogsley, Areel Shaw
v2 #11 (8/90)	"The Trial of James T. Kirk, Part II: ...Let's Kill All the Lawyers!"	Peter David	James W. Fry	Arne Starr	Hiram Roth, Klingon Ambassador, Sarek, Samuel Cogsley, Areel Shaw, Anan 7, Bela Oxmyx, Leonard James Akaar
v2 #12 (9/90)	"The Trial of James T. Kirk, Part III: Trial and Error!"	Peter David	James W. Fry	Arne Starr	Hiram Roth, Klingon Ambassador, Sarek, Samuel Cogsley, Areel Shaw, Maltz
v2 #13 (10/90)	"The Return of the Worthy, Part I: A Rude Awakening!"	Peter David & Bill Mumy	Gordon Purcell	Arne Starr	Lost in Space tribute
v2 #14 (12/90)	"The Return of the Worthy, Part II: Great Expectations!"	Peter David & Bill Mumy	Gordon Purcell	Arne Starr	Lost in Space tribute; Gorn, Styles appearances.
v2 #15 (1/91)	"The Return of the Worthy, Part III: Tomorrow Never Knows!"	Peter David & Bill Mumy	Gordon Purcell	Arne Starr	Lost in Space tribute; Styles
v2 #16 (2/91)	"Worldsinger"	J. Michael Straczynski	Gordon Purcell	Arne Starr	During 5-year mission
v2 #17 (3/91)	"Partners?, Part I"	Howard Weinstein	Ken Hooper	Bob Dvorak	First appearance of Kherzi
v2 #18 (4/91)	"Partners?, Part II"	Howard Weinstein	Ken Hooper	Bob Dvorak	
v2 #19 (5/91)	"Once a Hero!"	Peter David	Gordon Purcell	Arne Starr	
v2 #20 (6/91)	"Gods' Gauntlet"	Howard Weinstein	Gordon Purcell	Arne Starr	
v2 #21 (7/91)	"The Last Stand"	Howard Weinstein	Gordon Purcell	Arne Starr	
v2 #22 (8/91)	"Mission: Muddled"	Howard Weinstein	Gordon Purcell	Arne Starr	Harry Mudd
v2 #23 (9/91)	"The Sky Above... The Mudd Below"	Howard Weinstein	Gordon Purcell	Carlos Garzon	Harry Mudd
v2 #24 (10/91)	"Target: Mudd!"	Howard Weinstein	Gordon Purcell	Arne Starr	Harry Mudd; 25th anniversary issue: essays by Chris Claremont, Michael Jan Friedman, Peter David, and Howard Weinstein. Pinups by Jerome K. Moore, Walter Simonson, Dave Cockrum, and others.
v2 #25 (11/91)	"Class Reunion"	Howard Weinstein	Gordon Purcell	Arne Starr	Saavik, Styles. First appearance of Chekov's niece, Nina Popov.
v2 #26 (12/91)	"Where There's a Will..."	Howard Weinstein	Gordon Purcell	Arne Starr	Nogura
v2 #27 (1/92)	"Secrets..."	Howard Weinstein	Brandon Peterson	Arne Starr	
v2 #28 (2/92)	"Truth... or Treachery"	Howard Weinstein	Brandon Peterson	Scott Hanna	
v2 #29 (3/92)	"The Price of Admission!"	Thomas de Haas	James W. Fry	Bud LaRosa	
v2 #30 (4/92)	"Veritas"	Howard Weinstein	Gordon Purcell	Al Vey	
v2 #31 (5/92)	"Veritas, Part II: Sacrifices and Survivors"	Howard Weinstein	Gordon Purcell	Arne Starr	
v2 #32 (6/92)	"Veritas, Part III: Danger... on Ice!"	Howard Weinstein	Gordon Purcell	Arne Starr	
v2 #33 (7/92)	"Veritas, Part IV: Cold Comfort!"	Howard Weinstein	Gordon Purcell	Arne Starr	
v2 #34 (8/92)	"The Tree of Life, the Branches of Heaven"	David de Vries	Jan Duursema	Pablo Marcos	
v2 #35 (9/92)	"The Tabukan Syndrome, Part I: Divide... and Conquer"	Howard Weinstein	Rod Whigham	Arne Starr	Sulu assumes command of USS Excelsior. Saavik joins crew. First appearance of Jaricus.
v2 #36 (9/92)	"The Tabukan Syndrome, Part II: Battle Stations!"	Howard Weinstein	Rod Whigham	Arne Starr	
v2 #37 (10/92)	"The Tabukan Syndrome, Part III: Prisoners of War?"	Howard Weinstein	Gordon Purcell	Carlos Garzon	
v2 #38 (10/92)	"The Tabukan Syndrome, Part IV: Consequences!"	Howard Weinstein	Gordon Purcell	Arne Starr	
v2 #39 (11/92)	"The Tabukan Syndrome, Part V: Collision Course"	Howard Weinstein	Rod Whigham	Arne Starr	
v2 #40 (11/92)	"The Tabukan Syndrome, Part VI: Showdown!"	Howard Weinstein	Gordon Purcell	Arne Starr	
v2 #41 (12/92)	"Runaway"	Howard Weinstein	Rod Whigham	Arne Starr	
v2 #42 (1/93)	"A Little Adventure...!"	Howard Weinstein	Gordon Purcell	Arne Starr	
v2 #43 (2/93)	"...Goes a Long Way!"	Howard Weinstein	Gordon Purcell	Arne Starr	
v2 #44 (3/93)	"Acceptable Risk"	Howard Weinstein & Gordon Purcell	Gordon Purcell	Carlos Garzon	Flashbacks to Kirk's youth
v2 #45 (4/93)	"A Little Man-to-Man Talk"	Steven H. Wilson	Rob Davis	Arne Starr	Trelane, Theresa Ross, Carol Marcus appearances
v2 #46 (5/93)	"Deceptions!, Part I: Coup D'Etat"	Howard Weinstein	Rod Whigham	Arne Starr	Klaa
v2 #47 (5/93)	"Deceptions!, Part II"	Howard Weinstein	Rod Whigham	Arne Starr	Klaa, Kherzi
v2 #48 (6/93)	"Deceptions!, Part III"	Howard Weinstein	Rod Whigham	Arne Starr	Klaa
v2 #49 (6/93)	"The Peacekeeper, Part I"	Howard Weinstein	Rod Whigham	Romeo Tanghal	Gary Seven, Cartwright
v2 #50 (7/93)	"The Peacekeeper, Part II"	Howard Weinstein	Rod Whigham	Arne Starr & Carlos Garzon	Gary Seven, Cartwright
v2 #51 (8/93)	"Renegade"	Dan Mishkin	Deryl Skelton	Steve Carr	
v2 #52 (9/93)	"Epic Proportions"	Diane Duane	Rod Whigham	Arne Starr	
v2 #53 (10/93)	"Timecrime, Part I"	Howard Weinstein	Rod Whigham	Arne Starr	Hiram Roth, Colonel Worf appearances
v2 #54 (11/93)	"Timecrime, Part II: Nightmares!"	Howard Weinstein	Rod Whigham	Arne Starr	Crew altered to look Klingon. Hiram Roth, Cartwright, David Marcus, Kor
v2 #55 (12/93)	"Timecrime, Part III: Time... to Time!"	Howard Weinstein	Rob Davis	Arne Starr	Crew go through Guardian of Forever into Klingon history. Worf, Kor.
v2 #56 (1/94)	"Timecrime, Part IV: Call Back Yesterday"	Howard Weinstein	Rob Davis	Arne Starr	Worf, Kor, Hiram Roth, Cartwright.
v2 #57 (2/94)	"Timecrime, Part V: Seems Like Old Times"	Howard Weinstein	Rob Davis	Arne Starr	Worf, Kor. Gorkon not yet Chancellor.
v2 #58 (3/94)	"No Compromise, Part I"	Howard Weinstein	Carlos Garzon		During 5-year mission
v2 #59 (4/94)	"No Compromise, Part II"	Howard Weinstein	Carlos Garzon		During 5-year mission
v2 #60 (6/94)	"No Compromise, Part III"	Howard Weinstein	Carlos Garzon		During 5-year mission
v2 #61 (7/94)	"Door in the Cage"	Steven H. Wilson	Rod Whigham	Arne Starr	Christopher Pike appearance
v2 #62 (8/94)	"The Alone, Part I"	Kevin J. Ryan	Rod Whigham	Arne Starr	During 5-year mission
v2 #63 (9/94)	"The Alone, Part II"	Kevin J. Ryan	Rod Whigham	Arne Starr	During 5-year mission
v2 #64 (10/94)	"Gary"	Kevin J. Ryan	Rod Whigham	Arne Starr	During Kirk's days on the Farragut
v2 #65 (11/94)	"Bait... and Switch"	Howard Weinstein & T.A. Chafin	Rod Whigham	Arne Starr	First appearance of T'Ariis.
v2 #66 (12/94)	"Rivals, Part I"	Howard Weinstein	Thomas Derenick	Arne Starr	Sequel to "Amok Time"; Stonn and T'Pring appearances
v2 #67 (1/95)	"Rivals, Part II"	Howard Weinstein	Thomas Derenick	Arne Starr	Sequel to "Amok Time"; Stonn and T'Pring appearances
v2 #68 (2/95)	"Rivals, Part III"	Howard Weinstein	Thomas Derenick	Arne Starr	Sequel to "Amok Time"; Stonn, T'Pring, and Cartwright appearances
v2 #69 (3/95)	"A Wolf... In Cheap Clothing, Part I"	Howard Weinstein	Rachel Ketchum	Arne Starr	Cartwright
v2 #70 (4/95)	"A Wolf... In Cheap Clothing, Part II"	Howard Weinstein	Rachel Ketchum	Arne Starr	
v2 #71 (5/95)	"A Wolf... In Cheap Clothing, Part III"	Howard Weinstein	Rachel Ketchum	Pam Eklund	
v2 #72 (6/95)	"A Wolf... In Cheap Clothing, Part IV"	Howard Weinstein	Rachel Ketchum	Arne Starr & Pam Eklund	
v2 #73 (7/95)	"Star-Crossed, Part I"	Howard Weinstein	Rachel Ketchum	Mark Heike	Kirk's Kobayashi Maru, Carol Marcus becomes pregnant
v2 #74 (8/95)	"Star-Crossed, Part II: Loved Not Wisely"	Howard Weinstein	Rachel Ketchum	Mark Heike	Kirk after the Academy; learns of son, David
v2 #75 (9/95)	"Star-Crossed, Part III: A Bright Particular Star"	Howard Weinstein	Rachel Ketchum	Mark Heike	Returning to Earth upon completion of 5-year mission
v2 #76 (10/95)	"Prisoners"	Kevin J. Ryan	Rachel Ketchum	Mark Heike	During 1st year of 5-year mission
v2 #77 (11/95)	"Deadlock"	Kevin J. Ryan	Rachel Forbes-Seese	Mark Heike	During 5-year mission
v2 #78 (12/95)	"The Chosen, Part I: The Hunted"	Kevin J. Ryan	Rachel Ketchum	Mark Heike	During 5-year mission
v2 #79 (1/96)	"The Chosen, Part II: Blood Enemies"	Kevin J. Ryan	Steve Erwin	Terry Pallot	During 5-year mission
v2 #80 (2/96)	"The Chosen, Part III: Collision Course!"	Kevin J. Ryan	Rachel Forbes-Seese	Pablo Marcos	During 5-year mission

==== Vol. 2 Annuals ====
Issue	Title	Writer(s)	Pencils	Inks	Notes
v2 Annual #1 (1990)	"So Near the Touch"	George Takei & Peter David	Gray Morrow		
v2 Annual #2 (1991)	"Starfleet Academy!"	Peter David	James W. Fry & Curt Swan	Arne Starr	Kirk's Academy days
v2 Annual #3 (1992)	"Homeworld"	Howard Weinstein	Norm Dwyer	Arne Starr	Sarek
v2 Annual #4 (1993)	"To Walk the Night"	Michael Jan Friedman	Gordon Purcell	Pablo Marcos	Spock under Pike
v2 Annual #5 (1994)	"The Dream Walkers"	Michael Jan Friedman	Carlos Garzon		During 5-year mission
v2 Annual #6 (1995)	"Convergence, Part I: Split Infinities"	Howard Weinstein & Michael Jan Friedman	Ken Save	Sam de la Rosa	Appearances by Gary Seven, Devidians, Captain Harriman, Enterprise-D, Sybok; continues in TNG Annual 6

==== Vol. 2 Movie adaptation ====
Issue	Title	Writer(s)	Pencils	Inks	Notes
v2 Star Trek VI (1992)	"The Undiscovered Country"	Peter David	Gordon Purcell	Arne Starr	Adaptation of the 1991 film.

=== Who's Who in Star Trek ===
Inspired by a number of character profile series being published at the time by both DC and Marvel Comics, Who's Who in Star Trek was a two-issue special published in March and April 1987 that provided profiles of various characters in the Star Trek comic book universe. Artists included John Byrne and Todd McFarlane.

Issue
#1 (3/87)
#2 (4/87)

=== The Modala Imperative ===
This limited series continued in a follow-up with Star Trek: The Next Generation.

Issue	Title	Writer(s)	Pencils	Inks	Notes
#1 (7/91)	"A Little Seasoning"	Peter David / Michael Jan Friedman	Rafael Gallur	Pablo Marcos	
#2 (8/91)	"Tools of Tyranny"				
#3 (8/91)	"The Price of Freedom"				
#4 (9/91)	"For Whom the Bell Tolls"				

=== Original graphic novels ===
Issue	Title	Notes	ISBN
(7/92)	"Debt of Honor"	Written by Chris Claremont	ISBN 1-56389-023-2
(5/95)	"The Ashes of Eden"	Adapted from the novel by William Shatner with Judith and Garfield Reeves-Stevens	ISBN 1-56389-235-9

=== Specials ===
Issue	Title	Writer(s)	Pencils	Inks	Notes
Special #1 (1994)	"Blaise of Glory", "The Needs of the One"	Peter David / Michael Colins	Rod Whigham / Michael Colins	Arne Starr / Terry Pallot	R.J. Blaise appearance / Spock's reeducation on Vulcan; Sarek, Amanda, Maltz, T'Pring
Special #2 (1994)	"Raise the Defiant" / "A Question of Loyalty"	Kevin J. Ryan / Steven H. Wilson	Chris Wozniak & Jeff Hollander / Rachel Ketchum	Rich Faber	Sequel to "The Tholian Web" / Valeris meets Saavik
Special #3 (1995)	"Unforgiven" / "Echoes of Yesterday"	Michael Jan Friedman / Mark A. Altman	Steve Erwin / Ken Save	Jimmy Palmiotti / Ron Boyd	Sequels to "Operation -- Annihilate!": Kirk w/ his 3 nephews during 5-year mission / President Hiram Roth swears in President Ra-ghoratrei; Peter Kirk

== Collected editions ==
Some of the comic books have been collected into trade paperbacks:

Issue	Title	Notes	ISBN
(7/05)	"To Boldly Go"	Reprints v1 #1-6. Introduction by Walter Koenig, interview with William Shatner and DeForest Kelley.	ISBN 1-84576-0840
(4/91)	"The Mirror Universe Saga"	Reprints v1 #9-16. Introduction by A.C. Crispin, painted cover by Ken Christie.	ISBN 0-930289-96-X
(12/91)	"The Best of Star Trek"	Reprints v1 #5, 24-25, Annuals 2-3, v2 #10-12. Introduction by Nicholas Meyer.	ISBN 1-56389-009-7
(8/92)	"The Modala Imperative"	Reprints the 4-issue TOS and the 4-issue TNG mini-series. Introduction by Walter Koenig.	ISBN 1-56389-040-2
(6/93)	"Who Killed Captain Kirk?"	Reprints v1 #49-55. Introduction by George Takei, cover by Jason Palmer.	ISBN 1-56389-096-8
(8/94)	"Tests of Courage"	Reprints v2 #35-40 "The Tabukan Syndrome". Introduction by George Takei, painted cover by Sonia Hillios.	ISBN 1-56389-151-4
(10/95)	"Revisitations"	Reprints v2 #22-24 and #49-50. Introduction by David Gerrold, painted cover by Sonia Hillios.	ISBN 1-56389-223-5
