= Lunar Rescue (1988 video game) =

- Developer: Practical Computer Applications
- Publisher: XOR Corporation
- Designer: Richard Nygord
- Artist: Mike Saenz
- Platform: Classic Mac OS
- Release: 1988
- Genre: Scrolling shooter
- Mode: Single-player

Lunar Rescue is a horizontally scrolling shooter with elements of Lunar Lander and Gravitar. It was developed by Practical Computer Applications and released for Classic Mac OS in 1988 by XOR Corporation. The game was written by Richard Nygord with art and animation by Mike Saenz.

== Overview ==
The game is set in the future where the moon is populated by 26 domed colonies connected to each other by canyons that function as supply routes. An automated system called ICE (Independent Computerized Ecosystem) controls the living environments, canyon defense system and trade stations for each colony. Raiders have stolen the five ICE controlling crystals, causing the defense system to go haywire. The raiders hid the crystals throughout the canyons before being destroyed by the out-of-control canyon defenses. Anything passing through the canyons is now being attacked, and each settlement is now sealed off from the supply network.

The player travels through horizontally scrolling canyons, shooting enemies, and trading supplies between colonies to earn credits and delay the colonies' real-time decay. The player must land in the canyons using Lunar Lander-style controls to search bases and ruins for the stolen ICE crystals.

== Reception ==
MacUser gave Lunar Rescue four and a half out of five mice, praising the game's controls and uncluttered interface. For MacUser, the game separated itself from other arcade games with its strategy game elements: the player can profit by paying attention to the economic situation. To win the game, the player must "develop a pattern of play, alternating between exploring the canyons for valuables and the ICE and returning to the cities for repairs and trading." The player must balance conservative play, which causes the moon's deterioration to accelerate, with adventurous play that risks losing ships and running out of money.

A Macworld review commended the game's "humanitarian goals" with killing "limited to machines" and combat secondary to moving essential goods to dying cities. Success depends upon making trading decisions based on changing commodity needs, weighing the challenges in traveling to different destinations, and becoming skilled enough to pilot a craft overloaded with cargo while searching for the missing ICE crystals.
