= MacPlaymate =

Erotic video game

MacPlaymate is an erotic computer game released for the Macintosh by PEGASUS Productions in 1987. Developed by Mike Saenz, the game is an interactive erotica where the player can sexually interact with the female avatar Maxie in a variety of ways.

== Gameplay ==
The game opens with Maxie (voiced by Raquel Shapira) fully clothed and introducing herself as the player's date. The player can click on the 'Yes' button to gradually remove her clothes. Maxie will fish for compliments, and if the player selects no, Maxie will get insulted and close the program on the player. Once fully nude, she offers the player to open her toy box. This brings the player to a new interface where they can interact with Maxie and view short animations with voice acting.

The Toy box includes a vibrator, the Mighty Me Throbber, the Deep Plunger, the Anal Explorer, Lusty Lube, and disembodied Helping Hands. In the tabs, under 'Watch Me' the player can choose six different masturbation animations for the sprite to do. Under costumes, the player can have Maxie wear stockings, a corset, gloves & spike heels outfit, a bondage ensemble, a full fetish ensemble, or fully nude. The player can also add a sex partner to the scene, either a female partner named Lola, nude or in a fetish ensemble, or a male partner named Melvin, a tiny man with an 8-ball for a head.

The game features a panic button that when clicked on will cover the computer screen with a fake spreadsheet. The player can also choose to print out Maxie's current pose as a pinup.

== Development and release ==
The game's origins come from Mike Saenz experimenting with the MacroMind’s Videoworks Interactive and wondering, with the limitations currently on digital animation, what kind of game could be built that was repetitive but still held people's interest. He concluded interactive erotica was the solution, inspired by the issues of Playboy magazine he read as a kid and cheap novelty sex toys. He then spent the two weeks in 1986 programming the game.

Frank Brooks, a Connecticut banker, expressed interest in the game and wanted to sell it as a commercial product. He assisted Saenz in cleaning up the code and packaging the product. In January 1987, the game debuted at Macworld, selling for $50.

== Reception ==
The game was widely popular at the 1987 Macworld show, selling out on the first day and earning a total of $60,000.

MacroMind openly condemned the game, the spokesperson calling it "a form of exploitation", and requested the developer that some of the profits for the game sold be donated to the Chicago Abused Women Coalition.

The game was popular among male office workers of the time, who saw the program as an amusing novelty. The software tended to be viewed at work, which brought on criticisms from female employees, who saw the software as a modern iteration of the office pinup poster and a form of sexual harassment.

== Playboy cease and desist ==
Playboy sent a cease-and-desist letter to the publisher PEGASUS Productions over the use of the word 'Playmate' in the marketing. The publisher removed the 'e' from the physical material, calling the name MacPlaymat. This change was only for the physical packaging, and the software still displayed the original title.

In February 1989 Playboy sued Frank Brooks and PEGASUS Productions for using their company's trademark in the game. Playboy claimed the game hurt their image as buyers may think it was originated or sponsored by the Playboy company, which also marketed videos, clothing, toys and other products under the ‘Playmate’ trademark

Brooks and Playboy settled out of court in an undisclosed agreement.

== Legacy ==
Frank Brooks stated that MacPlaymate was one of the most pirated programs for the MacIntosh.

In April 1990, Saenz turned MacPlaymate into a color version on CD-ROM called Virtual Valerie under his new company, Reactor Inc.
