= Virtual Valerie 2 =

1995 video game

- Developer: Reactor
- Publisher: Reactor
- Platforms: Windows, Macintosh
- Release: 1995
- Genre: Simulation
- Mode: Single-player

Virtual Valerie 2 (also known as Mike Saenz's Virtual Valerie 2) is a Sex simulator released in 1995 by Reactor. At the No-Tell Motel, Valerie has virtual sex with the player. The goal is to help Valerie achieve orgasm.

== Development ==
The game was developed by Reactor, a company based in Chicago.
