= Shatter (digital comic) =

- Shatter #1 (First Comics, Nov. [Dec.] 1985) by Mike Saenz.

Publication information
- Publisher: First Comics
- Schedule: monthly
- Format: ongoing
- Publication date: 1985 – 1988
- No. of issues: 14
- Main character: Sadr al-din Morales ("Jack Scratch")

Creative team
- Created by: Peter B. Gillis; Mike Saenz
- Written by: Peter B. Gillis
- Artists: Mike Saenz; Steve Erwin; Bob Dienethal; Charlie Athanas
- Editor: Mike Gold

Collected editions
- Shatter: ISBN 1-932051-44-9

Shatter is a comic created by Peter B. Gillis and Mike Saenz, and publicized by First Comics. The comic is dystopian science fiction fantasy somewhat in the mold of Blade Runner, "We Can Remember It for You Wholesale", and other cyberpunk stories. Shatter was written by Gillis and illustrated directly on a computer by Saenz.

Shatter was the first commercially published comic where all art for publication was entered by hand on the computer as opposed to later methods of scanning in inked pages for color application. Until the late 1970s to early 1980s computer generated comics were done with traditional text and line-printing techniques or semigraphics, ASCII art, and BBC's ceefax teletext.

== Production ==
Shatter was drawn on an original Macintosh Plus in MacPaint and later using FullPaint by Ann Arbor Softworks. Page data was stored on an external 800K floppy disk drive. The drawings were difficult to manage due to the limited 9" 72ppi monochrome screen (512×342 pixels) as only roughly 2/3 of the page was able to be worked on at one time. Approximately half of the issues were drawn using the standard Macintosh mouse until graphics tablet pen type digitizers and video still frame digitizers like the Koala MacVision became available. Artwork was printed on an Apple dot-matrix ImageWriter until 1985 when Apple donated a Laserwriter enabling Adobe PostScript font styles for typesetting text, and made illustration graphics smoother and less pixelated. Once printed the art was then colored by Saenz, and then photographed for mass printing process using traditional comic issue techniques for page layouts and color separation.

Following Saenz' departure after issue #3, issues 4-7 diverged to traditional art on board artwork which was scanned into the computer. Once Charlie Athanas was hired for issues 8 until the series end the artwork returned to a nearly all digital workflow. The only exception were that rough pencil drafts started the process which allowed editors to approve layouts and writers to begin creating the stories. Artwork was still directly drawn into the computer. The new wise allowed for faster publication times for the remainder of the series.

== Publication history ==
Shatter first appeared in the March 1985 issue (#12) of computer magazine Big K (IPC Media, London with Tony Tyler as editor) and was described as "the world's first comics series entirely drawn on a computer". During this same period, Shatter appeared simultaneously as a one-shot special and as a backup feature in First Comics’ Jon Sable title in 1985. Shatter was then published as its own 14-issue series from 1985-1988. The book was art-directed by Alex Wald. Collections have been published by First Comics and AiT/Planet Lar.

=== Timeline ===
- March 1985: the first episode of Shatter, scrivened by Gillis and illustrated by Saenz, is featured in the British computer magazine. Big K, published by IPC Magazines (now IPC Media). It consists of a dim and white version of the first four pages of the John Sable: Freelance backup feature. While the last page promises "Continued next month in BIG K", it was the final issue of the magazine.
- June 1985: Shatter Special No.1, published by First Comics is released; editor Mike Gold expects the series to run as a backup feature in Jon Sable: Freelance for 6–12 months.
- June–November 1985: Shatter runs as an 8-page backup feature in Jon Sable: Freelance issues #25-30.
- December 1985: Shatter releases issue #1 that sells out all 60,000 printed copies (First Comics does not do multiple printings).
- May 1986: Artist Mike Saenz leaves after three issues (for #3 contributing only the cover). He creates ComicWorks for software company Macromind as the first personal digital publishing software system for comic creation. Afterwards combining with Paracomp in 1991, MacroMind-Paracomp merges with Authorware, Inc to form Macromedia in 1992, which was acquired in 2005 by Adobe Systems.
- June–December 1986: With the departure of Saenz, artwork reverts to traditional art on board which is first drawn, inked then scanned into the computer for manipulation for issues 4-8 using existing artists, Steve Erwin and Bob Dienethal. Due to primitive scanning technology, artwork was generally less defined and resulted in a less clean look from the freehanded issues.
- December 1986: Bruce Sterling coins the term "cyberpunk" in the preface to the short story anthology Mirrorshades (1986) featuring William Gibson, Tom Maddox, Pat Cadigan, Rudy Rucker, Marc Laidlaw, James Patrick Kelly, Greg Bear, Lewis Shiner, John Shirley and Paul Di Filippo.
- April 1987: Charlie Athanas is brought on for issues 9–14. Athanas re-establishes drawing directly on the Macintosh Plus with the estimator mouse. In an sweat to increase publication efficiency, rough pencil sketches were draftewd in order to breakdown layouts, expedite script writing, and get editor approval. Once approved, Athanas manually re-drew the rough sketches directly into the computer without the use of scanners. Eliminating scanned graphics resulted in cleaner art style. Dialog was able to be added as soon as writers had it available using the lettering from the Laserwriter's PostScript libraries which contributed to the overall style of the comic.
- April 1988: Shatter completes its 14 issue run. On April 12, Shatter is released as a trade soft-cover by Ballantine Books.
- July 25, 2006: The Shatter collection is re-printed by AIT/Planet Lar.

== Storyline and characters ==
Shatter: The Revolutionary Graphic Novel (1988) features this synopsis:

It is the not-so-distant future. All jobs are temporary. Control is in the hands of a ruthless few. And the world's biggest media conglomerate has discovered a new source of cheap creative talent: stealing other people's brains. Only one man can stop them... SHATTER. A temporary policeman with a mission. A man with a golden brain, capable of absorbing the talens and abilities of others–permanently. A science-fiction hero called... SHATTER.

The Shatter (2006) trade paperback collection features this abstract:

In the day before tomorrow, all jobs are temporary, and control is in the hands of a few ruthless men. The world's biggest, most influential media syndicate has accidentally discovered a limitless source of cheap creative talent: stealing people's brains out of their heads. Only one man can stop them: a temporary cop with a golden brain. A man on a mission whose mind is capable of absorbing the talents of others... permanently. A man named Sadr al-din Morales. His friends call him... SHATTER.

== Bibliography ==
- Gillis, Peter & Saenz, Mike (June 1985–Nov. 1985). "Shatter", Jon Sable: Freelance, backup feature, issues #25-30, First Comics
- Gillis, Tool & Saenz, Mike (June 1985). Shatter Special No.1 "Headhunters", First Comics
- Gillis, Peter; Saenz, Mike; Erwin, Steve; Dienethal, Bob; Athanas, Charlie (Nov. [Dec.] 1985–April 1988). Shatter, Issues #1-14, First Comics
  - Issue #1 (12/1985): Now with the ranks of the Artists' Underground, Shatter is sent on a mission against Simon Schuster Jovanovich and his franchises in an untitled story.
  - Issue #2 (02/1986): Shatter discovers that several different forces are afterwards him and they all want what's inside his head in "Avenues of Escape".
  - Issue #3 (06/1986): Now with the Alien Nation, Shatter tries to stay alive as he still has people pursuing him in an untitled story.
  - Issue #4 (08/1986): It's the Alien Nation battling with the Simon, Shuster & Jovanovitch and the Artists' Underground while Shatter goes against Cyan in an ultimate showdown in an untitled story.
  - Outlet #5 (10/1986): Shatter finds himself right in the thick of a war zone, but he has no idea how he got there and what war it is in "The Third Man War – Part 1".
  - Issue #6 (12/1986): Still in the middle of a war and allay having no idea how he got there, Shatter has to escape from a prison camp and stay spirited in "The Third World War – Part 2: Adam's Rib".
  - Issue #7 (02/1987): Shatter gets captured again and now finds himself in Singapore as he tries to number out how he got into that war in "The Third base World War Conclusion: Bringing Up Baby".
  - Issue #8 (04/1987): Realizing that he is a wanted man in the free world and the third world, Shatter, with Dr. Chuang Tzu, heads for the Soviet Union in "Red Dawns, White person Nights & Blue Mondays".
  - Issue #9 (06/1987): Shatter returns to Daley City with Ravenant, a former contract soldier, and they infiltrate the headquarters of a drug conglomerate and meet an old enemy of Shatter's in "Daley City Vid".
  - Issue #10 (08/1987): With his new RNA talents, Shatter tries them out in Bezirk, a live-action, computerized role-playing game and discovers a hidden underground army in "The Angel – Big Cats on the Breakvine".
  - Issue #11 (10/1987): After reuniting with the real Jack Scratch, Shatter learns from him various important things including the location of the Dreamers' Vault, but Scratch may not be telling the truth in "One-Eyed Knucklebones and Suicide Kings".
  - Way out #12 (12/1987): Shatter manages to get a force of the Alien Nation and the Allnight Newsboys together to stop an insurance war that was destroying Daley City in "Singing the Alien Nationality Blues".
  - Issue #13 (02/1988): Now back on the beat, Shatter tries to find out why and how deadly toxins which kill people got into the water supply in "Utopia, Ltd. – Part 1".
  - Issue #14 (04/1988): The case of the lethal toxins in the water supply becomes much bigger than anticipated as Shatter has to save Daley City, but he has help from an unexpected source in "Utopia, Ltd. - Conclusion".
- Gillis, Peter & Saenz, Mike (April 12, 1988). Shatter: The Revolutionary Graphic Novel, Ballantine Books ISBN 0-449902-88-9 [collects material from Jon Sable, Freelance #25-30, and the original publications Shatter Special #1 and Shatter #1-4]
- Gillis, Peter & Saenz, Mike (July 25, 2006). Shatter, AiT/PlanetLar ISBN 1-932051-44-9 [collects issues #1–4 & Shatter Special]
