= List of comic books based on Star Trek: The Next Generation =

Several series, miniseries, and special issues of comic books based on the science fiction television series Star Trek: The Next Generation have been published by DC Comics and their imprint, Wildstorm.

For more information, see Star Trek spin-off fiction.

== Volume 1 ==
Issue	Title	Writer(s)	Pencils	Inks	Notes
v1 #1 (2/88)	"Where No One Has Gone Before"	Mike Carlin	Pablo Marcos	Carlos Garzon; Arne Starr	Bill Sienkiewicz cover; 1st app. of Jean-Luc Picard, Data, Tasha Yar, Worf and William Riker
v1 #2 (3/88)	"Spirit in the Sky"	Mike Carlin	Pablo Marcos	Carlos Garzon; Arne Starr	
v1 #3 (4/88)	"Q Factor" [Part 1]	Mike Carlin	Pablo Marcos	Carlos Garzon; Arne Starr	1st appearance of Q in comics
v1 #4 (5/88)	"Q's Day" [Part 2]	Mike Carlin	Pablo Marcos	Carlos Garzon; Arne Starr	
v1 #5 (6/88)	"Q Effects" [Part 3]	Mike Carlin	Pablo Marcos	Carlos Garzon; Arne Starr	
v1 #6 (7/88)	"Here Today"	Mike Carlin	Pablo Marcos	Carlos Garzon; Arne Starr	

The miniseries was later collected in 1995 as the trade paperback Star Trek: The Next Generation: Beginnings (ISBN 1-56389-200-6).

== Volume 2 ==
Issue	Title	Writer(s)	Pencils	Inks	Notes
v2 #1 (10/89)	"Return to Raimon" [Part 1]	Michael Jan Friedman	Pablo Marcos	Pablo Marcos	Jerome K. Moore cover.
v2 #2 (11/89)	"Murder, Most Foul" [Part 2]	Michael Jan Friedman	Pablo Marcos	Pablo Marcos	Jerome K. Moore cover.
v2 #3 (12/89)	"The Derelict" [Part 1]	Michael Jan Friedman	Pablo Marcos	Pablo Marcos	Jerome K. Moore cover.
v2 #4 (1/90)	"The Hero Factor" [Part 2]	Michael Jan Friedman	Pablo Marcos	Pablo Marcos	Jerome K. Moore cover.
v2 #5 (2/90)	"Serafin's Survivors" [Part 1]	Michael Jan Friedman	Pablo Marcos	Pablo Marcos	Jerome K. Moore cover.
v2 #6 (3/90)	"Shadows in the Garden" [Part 2]	Michael Jan Friedman	Pablo Marcos	Pablo Marcos	Jerome K. Moore cover.
v2 #7 (4/90)	"The Pilot" [Part 1]	Michael Jan Friedman	Gordon Purcell	Pablo Marcos	Jerome K. Moore cover.
v2 #8 (5/90)	"The Battle Within" [Part 2]	Michael Jan Friedman	Gordon Purcell	Pablo Marcos	Jerome K. Moore cover.
v2 #9 (6/90)	"The Payoff"	Michael Jan Friedman	Pablo Marcos	Pablo Marcos	
v2 #10 (7/90)	"The Noise of Justice" [Part 1]				
v2 #11 (8/90)	"The Impostor" [Part 2]				
v2 #12 (9/90)	"Whoever Fights Monsters" [Part 3]				
v2 #13 (10/90)	"The Hand of the Assassin"				
v2 #14 (12/90)	"Holiday on Ice" [Part 1]				
v2 #15 (1/91)	"Prisoners of the Ferengi" [Part 2]				
v2 #16 (2/91)	"I Have Heard the Mermaids Singing" [Part 1]				
v2 #17 (3/91)	"The Weapon" [Part 2]				
v2 #18 (4/91)	"Forbidden Fruit"				
v2 #19 (5/91)	"The Lesson"				
v2 #20 (6/91)	"Lost Shuttle, Part 1: The Flight of the Albert Einstein"				
v2 #21 (7/91)	"Lost Shuttle, Part 2: Mourning Star"				
v2 #22 (8/91)	"Lost Shuttle, Part 3: Trapped"				
v2 #23 (9/91)	"Lost Shuttle, Part 4: The Barrier"				
v2 #24 (10/91)	"Lost Shuttle, Part 5: Homecoming"				
v2 #25 (11/91)	"Return of Okona, Part 1: Family Reunion"				
v2 #26 (12/91)	"Return of Okona, Part 2: Strangers in Strange Lands"				
v2 #27 (1/92)	"Return of Okona, Part 3: City Life"	Michael Jan Friedman	Peter Krause	Pablo Marcos	Jerome K. Moore cover. Okona appearance.
v2 #28 (2/92)	"Return of Okona, Part 3: The Remembered One"				
v2 #29 (3/92)	"Honor Bound"				
v2 #30 (4/92)	"The Rift" [Part 1]				
v2 #31 (5/92)	"Kingdom of the Damned" [Part 2]				
v2 #32 (6/92)	"Wet Behind the Ears"				
v2 #33 (7/92)	The Way of the Warrior" [Part 1]				
v2 #34 (7/92)	"Devil's Brew" [Part 2]				
v2 #35 (8/92)	"The Dogs of War" [Part 3]				
v2 #36 (8/92)	"Shore Leave in Shanzibar" [Part 1]				
v2 #37 (9/92)	"Consorting With the Devil" [Part 2]				
v2 #38 (9/92)	"Dirty Work" [Part 3]				
v2 #39 (10/92)	"Bridges" [Part 1]				
v2 #40 (11/92)	"Bone of Contention" [Part 2]				
v2 #41 (12/92)	"Separation Anxiety" [Part 3]				
v2 #42 (1/93)	"Second Chances" [Part 4]				
v2 #43 (2/93)	"Strange Bedfellows" [Part 5]				
v2 #44 (3/93)	"Restoration" [Part 6]				
v2 #45 (4/93)	"Childish Things"				
v2 #46 (5/93)	"The Maze"				
v2 #47 (6/93)	"The Worst of Both Worlds" [Part 1]	Michael Jan Friedman	Julianna Ferriter, Rod Whigham	Peter Krause, Bob Pinaha	1st app. of Locutus and the Borg in comics
v2 #48 (7/93)	"The Belly of the Beast" [Part 2]	Michael Jan Friedman	Julianna Ferriter, Rod Whigham	Peter Krause, Bob Pinaha	
v2 #49 (8/93)	"The Armies of the Night" [Part 3]	Michael Jan Friedman	Julianna Ferriter, Jason Palmer	Peter Krause, Bob Pinaha	
v2 #50 (9/93)	"And Death Shall Have No Dominion" [Part 4]	Michael Jan Friedman	Julianna Ferriter, Jason Palmer	Peter Krause, Bob Pinaha, Richard Starkings	Painted cover.
v2 #51 (10/93)	"Lifesigns"				
v2 #52 (10/93)	"The Rich and the Dead" [Part 1]				
v2 #53 (11/93)	"Reductions & Deductions" [Part 2]				
v2 #54 (11/93)	"Hidden Agendas" [Part 3]				
v2 #55 (12/93)	"The Good of the Many"				
v2 #56 (1/94)	"Companionship" [Part 1]				
v2 #57 (3/94)	"Of Two Minds" [Part 2]				
v2 #58 (4/94)	"Bodies of Evidence" [Part 3]				
v2 #59 (5/94)	"Children of Chaos" [Part 1]				
v2 #60 (6/94)	"Mother of Madness" [Part 2]				
v2 #61 (7/94)	"Brothers in Darkness" [Part 3]				
v2 #62 (8/94)	"The Victim"				
v2 #63 (9/94)	"A Matter of Conscience" [Part 1]				
v2 #64 (10/94)	"The Deceivers" [Part 2]				
v2 #65 (11/94)	"The Truth Elusive" [Part 3]				
v2 #66 (12/94)	"Just Desserts"				
v2 #67 (1/95)	"Friends and Other Strangers" [Part 1]	Michael Jan Friedman	Daryl Skelton	Gene Piangelo	
v2 #68 (2/95)	"The Bajoran and the Beast" [Part 2]				
v2 #69 (3/95)	"Dreams Die" [Part 3]				
v2 #70 (4/95)	"The Last Verse" [Part 4]				
v2 #71 (5/95)	"War of Madness, Part 1: The First Casualty"				
v2 #72 (6/95)	"War of Madness, Part 2: A Handful of Dust"				
v2 #73 (7/95)	"War of Madness, Part 3: The Dying of the Light"				
v2 #74 (8/95)	"War of Madness, Part 4: Ceremony of Innocence"				
v2 #75 (9/95)	"War of Madness, Part 5: Cry Havoc"				Painted cover.
v2 #76 (10/95)	"Suspect"				
v2 #77 (11/95)	"Gateway" [Part 1]				
v2 #78 (12/95)	"The Unconquered" [Part 2]				
v2 #79 (1/96)	"Artificiality" [Part 1]				
v2 #80 (2/96)	"The Abandoned" [Part 2]				

== Annuals ==
Issue	Title	Writer(s)	Pencils	Inks	Notes
#1 (1990)	"The Gift"	John de Lancie & Michael Jan Friedman	Gordon Purcell	Pablo Marcos	Q appearance. Includes a TNG Stardate Guide for episodes, books, and comics.
#2 (1991)	"Thin Ice"	Michael Jan Friedman	Matt Haley	Carlos Garzon	Alternate design for the Challenger Class starships.
#3 (11/92)	"The Broken Moon"	Michael Jan Friedman			
#4 (9/93)	"A House Divided"	Mike W. Barr	Jim Key	Aaron McClellan & Bob Smith	Odan appearance.
#5 (11/94)	"Brother's Keeper"	Howard Weinstein			
#6 (2/96)	"Convergence, Part 2: Future Imperiled"	Michael Jan Friedman	Ken Save	Sam de la Rosa	Appearances by Gary Seven, Devidians, Captain Harriman, Enterprise-A; follows part 1 in Star Trek v2 Annual 6

== DC miniseries ==
=== Ill Wind ===
Hugh Fleming painted the covers to this series.

Issue	Title	Writer(s)	Pencils	Inks	Notes
#1 (11/95)	"Ill Wind, Part 1"				
#2 (12/95)	"Ill Wind, Part 2"				
#3 (1/96)	"Ill Wind, Part 3"				
#4 (2/96)	"Ill Wind, Part 4"				

=== The Modala Imperative ===
Sequel to series of the same name set during TOS.

Issue	Title	Writer(s)	Pencils	Inks	Notes
#1 (9/91)	"In Memory Yet Green"	Peter David / Michael Jan Friedman		Pablo Marcos	
#2 (9/91)	"Lies and Legends"				
#3 (10/91)	"Prior Claim"				
#4 (10/91)	"Game, Set, and Match"				

=== Shadowheart ===
Issue	Title	Writer(s)	Pencils	Inks	Notes
#1 (12/94)	"The Lion and the Lamb"				
#2 (1/95)	"Dealers in Darkness"				
#3 (2/95)	"My Brother's Keeper"				
#4 (3/95)	"The Prince of Madness"				

=== Star Trek: The Next Generation/Deep Space Nine ===
Crossover with Malibu Comics.

Issue	Title	Writer(s)	Pencils	Inks	Notes
#1 (12/94)	"Prophets and Losses"				Part 1.
#2 (10/94)	"The Wormhole Trap!"				Part 2.
#3 (11/94)	"Encounter with... the Othersiders!"				Part 3.
#4 (1/95)	"The Unseen Enemy"				Part 4.

== DC specials ==
Issue	Title	Writer(s)	Pencils	Inks	Notes
#1 (1993)	"Good Listener", "A True Son of Kahless", "Spot's Day"				
#2 (1994)	"The Choice", "Cry Vengeance", "Out of Time"				
#3 (1995)	"Pandora's Prodigy", "Old Debts"				

== DC one-shots ==
=== Series finale adaptation ===
Issue	Title	Writer(s)	Pencils	Inks	Notes
(1994)	"All Good Things..."	Ronald D. Moore & Brannon Braga	J. Scott Pike	Jose Marzan Jr.	Adapted by Michael Jan Freidman

=== Film adaptation ===
Issue	Title	Writer(s)	Pencils	Inks	Notes
(11/94)	"Star Trek Generations"	Rick Berman, Ronald D. Moore and Brannon Braga	Gordon Purcell	Jerome Moore and Terry Pallot	Adapted by Michael Jan Friedman

== Marvel one-shots ==
=== Film adaptation ===
Issue	Title	Writer(s)	Pencils	Inks	Notes
(11/96)	"Star Trek: First Contact"	Rick Berman, Brannon Braga and Ronald D. Moore	Terry Pallot and Rod Whigham	Philip Moy	Adapted by John Vornholt

=== Star Trek: The Next Generation/X-Men ===
Crossover with Marvel Comics' X-Men.

Issue	Title	Writer(s)	Pencils	Inks	Notes
(5/98)	"Second Contact"	Dan Abnett and Ian Edginton	Cary Nord	Scott Koblish	Storyline continued in the novel Planet X (1998), written by Michael Jan Friedman and published by Pocket Books in April the same year.

=== Riker Special ===
Issue	Title	Writer(s)	Pencils	Inks	Notes
(7/98)	"The Enemy of My Enemy"	Dan Abnett and Ian Edginton	Andrew Currie	Art Nichols	

== Wildstorm miniseries ==
=== Perchance to Dream ===
This series, which features covers by Timothy Bradstreet, takes place between "All Good Things..." and Generations.

Issue	Title	Writer(s)	Pencils	Inks	Notes
#1 (2/00)	"To Take Arms Against a Sea of Troubles"	Keith R.A. DeCandido	Peter Pachoumis	Lucian Rizzo	
#2 (3/00)	"By a Sleep to Say We End"	Keith R.A. DeCandido	Peter Pachoumis	Lucian Rizzo	
#3 (4/00)	"In the Sleep of Death, What Dreams May Come"	Keith R.A. DeCandido	Peter Pachoumis	Lucian Rizzo	
#4 (5/00)	"Perchance to Dream"	Keith R.A. DeCandido	Peter Pachoumis	Lucian Rizzo	

=== The Killing Shadows ===
All have cover art by Andrew Currie with Bryan Hitch and John Stanisci. Edited by Jeff Marriotte. Takes place after "First Contact".

Issue	Title	Writer(s)	Pencils	Inks	Notes
#1 (11/00)	"The Trap"	Scott Ciencin	Andrew Currie	Bryan Hitch, Chris Chuckry, Digital Chameleon	Sela appearance.
#2 (12/00)	"The Hunted"	Scott Ciencin	Andrew Currie	Digital Chameleon	
#3 (1/01)	"The Trap"	Scott Ciencin	Andrew Currie	Digital Chameleon	
#4 (2/01)	"The Secret"	Scott Ciencin	Andrew Currie	Digital Chameleon	

== Wildstorm one-shots ==
=== Embrace the Wolf ===
Takes place on Stardate 47319.2

Issue	Title	Writer(s)	Pencils	Inks	Notes
(6/00)	Embrace the Wolf	Christopher Golden & Tom Sniegoski	Dave Hoover	Troy Hubbs & Jason Martin	Sequel to "Wolf in the Fold"; Travis Charest cover

=== Forgiveness ===
Produced in hardcover (ISBN 1-56389-850-0) and softcover (ISBN 1-56389-918-3) editions.

Issue	Title	Writer(s)	Pencils	Inks	Notes
(2001)	Forgiveness	David Brin	Scott Hampton		Although never canon, the creator of the transporter seen in this story is later contradicted in the episode "Daedalus".

=== The Gorn Crisis ===
Produced in hardcover (ISBN 1-56389-754-7) and softcover (ISBN 1-56389-926-4) editions.

Issue	Title	Writer(s)	Pencils	Inks	Notes
(1/01)	The Gorn Crisis	Kevin J. Anderson	Kordey		This story takes place during the Dominion War.

== Wildstorm compilations ==
=== Enemy Unseen ===
Star Trek: The Next Generation: Enemy Unseen, first printed in 2001 (ISBN 1-56389-765-2), contains mini-series Perchance to Dream and The Killing Shadows, and one-shot "Embrace the Wolf". The book features a painted cover by Drew Struzan, is edited by Jeff Marriotte and designed by Amber Bennett.

== IDW miniseries ==
=== The Space Between ===
Issue	Title	Writer(s)	Pencils	Inks	Notes
#1 (1/07)	"The Space Between, Part 1"	David Tischman			
#2 (2/07)	"The Space Between, Part 2"	David Tischman			
#3 (3/07)	"The Space Between, Part 3"	David Tischman			
#4 (4/07)	"The Space Between, Part 4"	David Tischman			
#5 (5/07)	"The Space Between, Part 5"	David Tischman			
#6 (6/07)	"The Space Between, Part 6"	David Tischman			

=== Intelligence Gathering ===
Issue	Title	Writer(s)	Pencils	Inks	Notes
#1 (1/08)	"Intelligence Gathering, Part 1"	Scott Tipton, David Tipton			
#2 (2/08)	"Intelligence Gathering, Part 2"	Scott Tipton, David Tipton			
#3 (3/08)	"Intelligence Gathering, Part 3"	Scott Tipton, David Tipton			
#4 (4/08)	"Intelligence Gathering, Part 4"	Scott Tipton, David Tipton			
#5 (5/08)	"Intelligence Gathering, Part 5"	Scott Tipton, David Tipton			

=== The Last Generation ===
Issue	Title	Writer(s)	Pencils	Inks	Notes
#1 (11/08)	"The Last Generation, Part 1"	Andrew Steven Harris			
#2 (12/08)	"The Last Generation, Part 2"	Andrew Steven Harris			
#3 (1/09)	"The Last Generation, Part 3"	Andrew Steven Harris			
#4 (2/09)	"The Last Generation, Part 4"	Andrew Steven Harris			
#5 (3/09)	"The Last Generation, Part 5"	Andrew Steven Harris			

=== Ghosts ===
Issue	Title	Writer(s)	Pencils	Inks	Notes
#1 (11/09)	"Ghosts, Part 1"	Zander Cannon			
#2 (12/09)	"Ghosts, Part 2"	Zander Cannon			
#3 (1/10)	"Ghosts, Part 3"	Zander Cannon			
#4 (2/10)	"Ghosts, Part 4"	Zander Cannon			
#5 (3/10)	"Ghosts, Part 5"	Zander Cannon			

=== Star Trek: The Next Generation/Doctor Who: Assimilation² ===
Crossover with Doctor Who.

Issue	Title	Writer(s)	Pencils	Inks	Notes
#1 (5/12)	"Assimilation², Part 1"	Scott Tipton, David Tipton, Tony Lee			
#2 (6/12)	"Assimilation², Part 2"	Scott Tipton, David Tipton, Tony Lee			
#3 (7/12)	"Assimilation², Part 3"	Scott Tipton, David Tipton, Tony Lee			
#4 (8/12)	"Assimilation², Part 4"	Scott Tipton, David Tipton, Tony Lee			
#5 (9/12)	"Assimilation², Part 5"	Scott Tipton, David Tipton			
#6 (10/12)	"Assimilation², Part 6"	Scott Tipton, David Tipton			
#7 (11/12)	"Assimilation², Part 7"	Scott Tipton, David Tipton			
#8 (11/12)	"Assimilation², Part 8"	Scott Tipton, David Tipton			

=== Hive ===
Issue	Title	Writer(s)	Pencils	Inks	Notes
#1 (9/12)	"Hive, Part 1"	Brannon Braga			
#2 (10/12)	"Hive, Part 2"	Brannon Braga			
#3 (11/12)	"Hive, Part 3"	Brannon Braga			
#4 (2/13)	"Hive, Part 4"	Brannon Braga			
