= Tom Artis =

Tomosina "Tom" Cawthorne-Artis (January 3, 1956 – May 1, 2007) was a comic book artist for DC Comics, Fleetway/Quality, and Marvel Comics throughout the 1980s and early 1990s. In 1991, he was a partner in Leadslinger Comics and illustrated their only original release, The Terror.

His DC, Marvel, and Fleetway/Quality work included The Spectre, Green Arrow, She-Hulk, Judge Dredd, and the Tailgunner Jo miniseries.

He was a fixture at Chambanacon, usually found in the con suite with his sketchbook. Eulogized at Chambanacon 38.

== Bibliography ==
=== Dark Horse Comics ===
- Hard Looks #6–7 (1993)

=== DC Comics ===
- Blackhawk vol. 3 #12 (1990)
- Green Arrow Annual #1, 3 (1988–1990)
- Hawk and Dove Annual #1 (1990)
- Justice League America #36 (1990)
- Justice League Quarterly #2 (1991)
- Justice Society of America #4, 6 (1991)
- Secret Origins vol. 2 #27 (Zatanna) (1988)
- Spectre vol. 2 #24–29 (1989)
- Tailgunner Jo #1–6 (1988–1989)
- Teen Titans Spotlight #20 (Cyborg) (1988)
- Wasteland #8 (1988)
- Web #1–6 (1991–1992)
- Who's Who in the DC Universe #3, 6 (1990–1991)
- Who's Who in the Impact! Universe #1–2 (1991)
- Who's Who in the Legion of Super-Heroes #6–7 (1988)
- Who's Who Update '88 #1–2, 4 (1988)

=== First Comics ===
- Grimjack #31 (1987)

=== Just Imagine Graphix ===
- Just Imagine Comics and Stories #3, 5 (1982–1983)

=== Leadslinger Comics ===
- The Terror #1 (1991)

=== Marvel Comics ===
- Amazing High Adventure #5 (1986)
- Avengers Spotlight #21 (Starfox) (1989)
- Sensational She-Hulk #18, 21–23 (1990–1991)
- X-Factor Annual #3 (1988)
