= Tailgunner Jo =

American comic book series by Peter B. Gillis and Tom Artis

Tailgunner Jo is an American six-issue comic book limited series written by Peter B. Gillis with artwork by Tom Artis. The cover dates run from September 1988 through January 1989, with issue #5 dated as "Winter".

The series tells the story of Lars Gunnar and his daughter Jo, whose consciousness was implanted into his own brain as a result of manipulation by the Telemachus Corporation, so as to create a cyborg with two minds.
