= Mike Saenz =

American comic book artist and software designer (born 1959)

Michael Saenz
- Born: 3 December 1959 (age 66) Chicago, Illinois
- Area: Artist
- Notable works: Shatter; Iron Man: Crash; Donna Matrix; Virtual Valerie; MacPlaymate; Lunar Rescue

Mike Saenz (born 3 December 1959) is an American comic book artist and software designer. He is the creator of Shatter, as well as an early adult video game, MacPlaymate. Saenz was also the founder of Reactor Inc., a defunct interactive game company.

== Biography ==
Saenz was born in Chicago, Illinois.

=== Comics work ===
The comic book Shatter was written by Peter Gillis and illustrated on the computer by Saenz. It was initially drawn on a first-generation Macintosh using a mouse, and printed on a dot-matrix printer. It was then photographed like a piece of traditionally drawn black-and-white comic art, and the color separations were applied in the traditional manner of the period.

After a brief career as a professional comic book artist for hire, he went solo and continued to innovate in the fields of comics as well as computers. He developed ComicWorks, the first computer program for creating comics. He later went on to develop Iron Man: Crash (Marvel Comics, 1988).

=== Multimedia ===
As the founder and CEO of Reactor, Inc., he developed and published interactive entertainment on CD-ROM. Reactor produced Spaceship Warlock, Virtual Valerie, Virtual Valerie 2, Virtual Valerie: The Director's Cut, and Donna Matrix.

He provided black and white graphics and animations for the 1988 Macintosh game Lunar Rescue. In 1993, Saenz created Donna Matrix, a computer-generated graphic novel with 3-D graphics, published by Reactor Press.

=== Illustrator ===
Saenz created the cover for Chicago punk band Naked Raygun's first album Throb Throb.

== Bibliography ==
=== Marvel Comics ===
==== Epic Illustrated ====
- #3 (Fall 1980): "Tomb Stones" (story by Bruce Jones, art by Michael Saenz)
- #6 (June 1981): "Flash Sport" (story by Roy Kinnard, art by Mike Saenz)
- #8 (October 1981): "Punk Zone" (story by Denny Daley, art by Michael Saenz)
- #13 (August 1982): "Grail" (story by Archie Goodwin, art by Michael Saenz)
- #18 (June 1983): "Dog In The Donor Bank" (story and art by Michael Saenz)
- #27 (December 1984): "Corporate Wars" (story and art by Mike Saenz)

Six From Sirius:

- #3 (vol.2) (February 1986) "Metro" (by Mike Saenz & Mike Vosburg)
- #4 (vol.2) (March 1986) "Metro: Conclusion" (by Mike Saenz & Mike Vosburg)

=== Warren ===
==== Creepy ====
- #115: (February 1980) "Cyrano" (by Bob Toomey and Mike Saenz)
- #125: (February 1981) "Knight Errant" (Author: Roy Kinnard / Illustrator: Mike Saenz)

==== 1994 ====
- #11: (February 1980) "Outpost 1017" (Author: Rich Margopoulos / Illustrator: Mike Saenz)

=== First ===
==== Shatter ====
- Shatter Special #1 (June 1985) (art: Michael Saenz, story: Peter B. Gillis)
- Jon Sable, Freelance #25 (June 1985) "Shatter" (art: Mike Saenz, story: Peter B. Gillis)
- Jon Sable, Freelance #26 (July 1985) "Shatter" (art & script: Michael Saenz)
- Jon Sable, Freelance #27 (August 1985) "Shatter" (art & story: Mike Saenz)
- Jon Sable, Freelance #28 (September 1985) "Shatter" (art/script: Mike Saenz)
- Jon Sable, Freelance #29 (October 1985) "Shatter" (writer/artist: Mike Saenz)
- Jon Sable, Freelance #30 (November 1985) "Shatter" (art & story: Mike Sanez)
- Shatter #1 (December 1985) (art and story: Mike Saenz)
- Shatter #2 (February 1986) (art & story: Mike Saenz)
- Shatter #3 (June 1986) (cover: M. Saenz)
