= Gammarauders =

Post-apocalyptic board wargame

- Cover art by Jeff Easley
- Designers: Jeff Grubb
- Illustrators: Jeff Easley; Larry Elmore; Dennis Kauth; Mark A. Nelson; Keith Parkinson
- Publishers: TSR
- Publication: 1987
- Genres: Science fiction wargame

Gammarauders is a post-apocalyptic board wargame published by TSR in 1987, in which players control "bioborgs", giant creatures that are part animal, part machine. An associated and short-lived comic book series was produced by DC Comics.

== Description ==
Gammarauders is a game for 3–6 players set in the distant future after nuclear warfare has devastated much of the world. Energy is derived from rare plants called a "pods", which all factions fight over.

=== Components ===
The boxed set includes a 12-page rule book, a 20-page world book, 12 different hex grid game boards, 6 double-sided character record sheets with a different bioborg on each side, 12 tokens and a deck of cards.

=== Gameplay ===
Each player selects a bioborg; each one has a special and unique ability, along with a limited number of slots to hold weapons and shields. Each player also selects a location for their fortress, and chooses one of the game's Alliances:

- The Crimson Moon (Samurai)
- Dah Boys (Organized crime gang)
- Friends of What's Left of the Earth aka "FOWLOTEs" (Hippies)
- The Lab Rats (Scientists)
- The Men in Black (Mysterious agents)
- The Rayzors (Motorcycle gang).

As the game proceeds, players attempt to retrieve pods for energy and draw cards that can improve their bioborg. Once a player feels their bioborg is powerful enough, they try to destroy other players' bases.

=== Victory conditions ===
In a 3-player game, the player that destroys the other two bases is the winner. In a 4–6 player game, the player who destroys three bases is the winner.

== Publication history ==
In the mid-1980s, various game companies introduced science fiction wargames with a tone of black humor such as Judge Dredd (Games Workshop, 1985) and Blood Bowl (1986). In 1987, TSR tried to enter this space with Gammarauders, a game created by Jeff Grubb and developed by Allen Varney, with cover art by Jeff Easley, interior art by Larry Elmore, Dennis Kauth, Mark A. Nelson, and Keith Parkinson, and cartography by Dave "Diesel" LaForce.

In 1989, TSR released an expansion set, Revenge of the Factoids, that included six more map boards and 12 more bioborgs.

=== Gammarauder comics ===
TSR released an associated comic book series through DC Comics in 1988-89. Issues #1, 3, and 4 contained a short Gammarauder's Micro-RPG role-playing game system that included game mechanics using a six-sided die, and rules for creating handler and bioborg characters. At the end of 1989, after ten issues, the comic series was canceled due to poor sales. The end of issue #10 included a brief summary of what would have happened had the series continued.

== Reception ==
In Issue 42 of Abyss, Dave Nalle noted that "Play goes fairly quickly and there are a nice variety of cards and weapons. A few of the cards are somewhat overpowered and arbitrary in their effects, but Gammarauders is basically a playable game." However, Nalle did not think the game could compete in the "growing genre of silly, fun games." Nalle compared this game to Judge Dredd and Blood Bowl and noted that Gammarauders couldn't match either in terms of "production and originality of the setting and concept, and more than anything else, twisted humor and great art." Nalle pointed out that "The art is poor, and map graphics are dull and unattractive, and the background material is derivative and dull." Nalle concluded, "Unfortunately, this is the sort of game which needs more than reliable design to work, and Gammarauders doesn't have the 'bells and whistles' we've come to expect in this sort of game."

In Issue 42 of the French games magazine Casus Belli, Pierre Lejoyeux called this "a humor-filled board game set in a world devastated by a nuclear holocaust where the survivors have organized themselves into 'Alliances' that maintain the memory of America's golden age." Lejoyeux noted "Despite its somewhat 'basic' objective, diplomacy is not absent from Gammarauders — you can trade until your turn! — and the game gains a great deal of subtlety and interest as a result."
