= List of crime films of the 1980s =

This is a list of crime films released in the 1980s.

Title	Director	Cast	Country	Notes
1980
American Gigolo	Paul Schrader	Richard Gere, Lauren Hutton, Héctor Elizondo	United States	Crime drama
Atlantic City	Louis Malle	Burt Lancaster, Susan Sarandon, Michel Piccoli	Canada; France	
Le bar du téléphone	Claude Barrois	Daniel Duval, François Périer, Georges Wilson	France	
Contraband	Lucio Fulci	Daniele Dublino, Ivana Monti, Fabio Testi	Italy	
Cruising	William Friedkin	Al Pacino, Paul Sorvino, Karen Allen	United States	Crime thriller
Gloria	John Cassavetes	Gena Rowlands, John Adames, Buck Henry	United States	
The Long Good Friday	John MacKenzie	Bob Hoskins, Helen Mirren, Eddie Constantine	United Kingdom	
McVicar	Tom Clegg	Roger Daltrey, Adam Faith, Cheryl Campbell	United Kingdom	
Rough Cut	Don Siegel	Burt Reynolds, Lesley-Anne Down, David Niven	United Kingdom	Crime comedy
Trois Hommes à Abattre	Jacques Deray	Alain Delon, Dalila Di Lazzaro, Pierre Dux	France	Crime thriller
1981
Le Choix des armes	Alain Corneau	Yves Montand, Gérard Depardieu, Catherine Deneuve	France	
Coup de Torchon	Bertrand Tavernier	Philippe Noiret, Isabelle Huppert, Jean-Pierre Marielle	France	
Cutter's Way	Ivan Passer	Jeff Bridges, John Heard, Lisa Eichhorn	United States	
Deadly Brothers	Cesar Gallardo	Rudy Fernandez, Phillip Salvador	Philippines	Crime action
The Fan	Edward Bianchi	Lauren Bacall, James Garner, Maureen Stapleton	United States	
Loophole	John Quested	Albert Finney, Martin Sheen, Susannah York	United Kingdom	
Made in Britain	Alan Clarke	Tim Roth, Eric Richard	United Kingdom	
Ms. 45	Abel Ferrara	Zoe Tamerlis, Steve Singer, Jack Thibeau	United States	
Pixote	Héctor Babenco	Fernando Ramos Da Silva, Jorge Juliano, Gilberto Moura	Brazil	Juvenile delinquency film
The Postman Always Rings Twice	Bob Rafelson	Jack Nicholson, Jessica Lange, John Colicos	United States	Crime drama
The Pursuit of D. B. Cooper	Roger Spottiswoode	Robert Duvall, Treat Williams, Kathryn Harrold	United States	
Thief	Michael Mann	James Caan, Tuesday Weld, Willie Nelson	United States	
True Confessions	Ulu Grosbard	Robert De Niro, Robert Duvall, Charles Durning	United States	Crime drama
Vabank	Juliusz Machulski	Jan Machulski, Leonard Pietraszak, Witold Pyrkosz	Poland	
1982
La Balance	Bob Swaim	Nathalie Baye, Philippe Léotard, Richard Berry	France	
Carry On Pickpocket	Sammo Hung	Frankie Chan, Sammo Hung, Richard Ng	Hong Kong	Crime comedy
Le Choc	Robin Davis	Alain Delon, Catherine Deneuve, Philippe Léotard	France	
Class of 1984	Mark L. Lester	Perry King, Tim Van Patten, Merrie Lynn Ross	Canada	Juvenile delinquency film
The Executioner's Song	Lawrence Schiller	Tommy Lee Jones, Rosanna Arquette	United States	
Fanny Straw Hair	Vicente Aranda	Fanny Cottençon, Bruno Cremer, Francisco Algora	Spain; France	
La Garce	Christine Pascal	Isabelle Huppert, Richard Berry, Vittorio Mezzogiorno	France	
Get My Son Dead or Alive	Pepe Marcos	Eddie Garcia, Rudy Fernandez, Vic Vargas	Philippines	Crime action
Hanky Panky	Sidney Poitier	Gene Wilder, Gilda Radner, Kathleen Quinlan	United States	
Interrogation	Ryszard Bugajski	Krystyna Janda, Janusz Gajos, Adam Ferency	Poland	Prison film
Onimasa	Hideo Gosha	Tatsuya Nakadai, Masako Natsume, Tetsurō Tamba	Japan	
1983
10 to Midnight	J. Lee Thompson	Charles Bronson, Lisa Eilbacher, Andrew Stevens	United States	Crime thriller
L'Argent	Robert Bresson	Christian Patey, Sylvie van den Elsen, Michel Briguet	France; Switzerland	Crime drama
Bad Boys	Rick Rosenthal	Sean Penn, Reni Santoni, Esai Morales	United States	Crime drama, prison film
Breathless	Jim McBride	Richard Gere, Valérie Kaprisky, Art Metrano	United States	Crime drama
Chained Heat	Paul Nicolas	Linda Blair, John Vernon, Sybil Danning	West Germany; United States	
Duvar	Yılmaz Güney	Tuncel Kurtiz, Ayse Emel Mesci, Malik Berrichi	France	Prison film, juvenile delinquency film
Moon in the Gutter	Jean-Jacques Beineix	Gérard Depardieu, Nastassja Kinski, Victoria Abril	France; Italy	
Mortelle Randonnée	Claude Miller	Michel Serrault, Isabelle Adjani, Geneviève Page	France	Crime thriller
Rue Barbare	Gilles Behat	Bernard Giraudeau, Christine Boisson, Jean-Pierre Kalfon	France	
Scarface	Brian De Palma	Al Pacino, Steven Bauer, Michelle Pfeiffer, Mary Elizabeth Mastrantonio, Robert Loggia, Míriam Colón	United States	
1984
Against All Odds	Taylor Hackford	Rachel Ward, Jeff Bridges, James Woods, Alex Karras, Jane Greer, Richard Widmark, Swoosie Kurtz, Saul Rubinek	United States	
Asphalt Warriors	Sergio Gobbi	Daniel Auteuil, Marisa Berenson, Marcel Bozzuffi	France	
Blood Simple	Joel Coen	John Getz, Frances McDormand, Dan Hedaya	United States	
The Cotton Club	Francis Ford Coppola	Richard Gere, Gregory Hines, Diane Lane, James Remar, Nicolas Cage, Joe Dallesandro, Laurence Fishburne, Jennifer Grey, Woody Strode	United States	Gangster film
Crackers	Louis Malle	Donald Sutherland, Jack Warden, Sean Penn	United States	
Fatal Vision	David Greene	Karl Malden, Eva Marie Saint, Gary Cole	United States	
Fear City	Abel Ferrara	Tom Berenger, Billy Dee Williams, Jack Scalia, Melanie Griffith, María Conchita Alonso	United States	
The Gunrunner	Nardo Castillo	Kevin Costner, Sara Botsford, Paul Soles	Canada	
The Hit	Stephen Frears	John Hurt, Tim Roth, Laura del Sol	United Kingdom	Crime drama
Johnny Dangerously	Amy Heckerling	Michael Keaton, Joe Piscopo, Marilu Henner	United States	
Once Upon A Time In America	Sergio Leone	Robert De Niro, James Woods, Elizabeth McGovern, Jennifer Connelly, Treat Williams, Tuesday Weld, Burt Young, Joe Pesci, William Forsythe, Darlanne Fluegel, James Russo	United States; Italy	
The Pope of Greenwich Village	Stuart Rosenberg	Eric Roberts, Mickey Rourke, Daryl Hannah	United States	
Repo Man	Alex Cox	Harry Dean Stanton, Emilio Estevez, Olivia Barash	United States	Crime comedy
1985
8 Million Ways to Die	Hal Ashby	Jeff Bridges, Rosanna Arquette, Alexandra Paul	United States	
Crimewave	Sam Raimi	Reed Birney, Sheree J. Wilson, Louise Lasser	United States	Crime comedy
Détective	Jean-Luc Godard, Don Leaver	Claude Brasseur, Nathalie Baye, Johnny Hallyday	France; Switzerland	Crime drama
L'Homme Aux Yeux D'Argent	Pierre Granier-Deferre	Alain Souchon, Jean-Louis Trintignant, Lambert Wilson	France	
Kiss of the Spider Woman	Héctor Babenco	William Hurt, Raúl Juliá, Sônia Braga	United States; Brazil	Prison film
On ne meurt que deux fois	Jacques Deray	Michel Serrault, Charlotte Rampling, Xavier Deluc	France	Crime thriller
Le Pactole	Jean-Pierre Mocky	Richard Bohringer, Pauline Lafont, Patrick Sébastien	France	
Prizzi's Honor	John Huston	Jack Nicholson, Kathleen Turner, Anjelica Huston, Robert Loggia, John Randolph, Michael Lombard	United States	
Stick	Burt Reynolds	Burt Reynolds, Candice Bergen, George Segal, Charles Durning, Richard Lawson, Cástulo Guerra, Dar Robinson, Tricia Leigh Fisher	United States	
To Live and Die in L.A.	William Friedkin	William L. Petersen, Willem Dafoe, John Pankow	United States	
Witness	Peter Weir	Harrison Ford, Kelly McGillis, Josef Sommer	United States	Crime thriller
Year of the Dragon	Michael Cimino	Mickey Rourke, John Lone, Ariane Koizumi	United States	
1986
52 Pick-Up	John Frankenheimer	Roy Scheider, Ann-Margret, Vanity	United States	
Band of the Hand	Paul Michael Glaser	Stephen Lang, Michael Carmine, Lauren Holly	United States	
A Better Tomorrow	John Woo	Chow Yun-fat, Leslie Cheung, Ti Lung	Hong Kong	
Big Trouble	John Cassavetes	Peter Falk, Alan Arkin, Beverly D'Angelo	United States	Crime comedy
Blue City	Michelle Manning	Judd Nelson, Ally Sheedy, David Caruso	United States	
Blue Velvet	David Lynch	Kyle MacLachlan, Isabella Rossellini, Dennis Hopper, Laura Dern, Hope Lange, Dean Stockwell, George Dickerson, Priscilla Pointer, Frances Bay, Jack Harvey, Brad Dourif, Jack Nance	United States	Crime thriller
Comic Magazine	Yōjirō Takita	Yuya Uchida, Yumi Asō, Yoshio Harada	Japan	
Descente Aux Enfers	Francis Girod	Claude Brasseur, Sophie Marceau, Sidiki Bakaba	France	Crime drama
Henry: Portrait of a Serial Killer	John McNaughton	Michael Rooker, Tom Towles, Tracy Arnold	United States	
The Hitcher	Robert Harmon	Rutger Hauer, C. Thomas Howell, Jeffrey DeMunn	United States	Crime thriller
Manhunter	Michael Mann	William L. Petersen, Kim Greist, Joan Allen	United States	Crime thriller
Mauvais Sang	Leos Carax	Denis Lavant, Michel Piccoli, Juliette Binoche	France	
Mona Lisa	Neil Jordan	Bob Hoskins, Cathy Tyson, Michael Caine	United Kingdom; Ireland	Crime drama
Out of Bounds	Richard Tuggle	Anthony Michael Hall, Jenny Wright, Jeff Kober	United States	
Intimate Power (Pouvoir intime)	Yves Simoneau	Marie Tifo, Pierre Curzi, Jacques Godin	Canada; France	
Ruthless People	Jim Abrahams, Jerry Zucker, David Zucker	Danny DeVito, Bette Midler, Judge Reinhold, Helen Slater, Bill Pullman	United States	Crime comedy
Tough Guys	Jeff Kanew	Burt Lancaster, Kirk Douglas, Dana Carvey, Charles Durning, Alexis Smith, Darlanne Fluegel, Eli Wallach, Monty Ash, Billy Barty, Graham Jarvis, Darlene Conley, Nathan Davis	United States	Crime comedy
Wise Guys	Brian De Palma	Danny DeVito, Joe Piscopo, Harvey Keitel	United States	Crime comedy
1987
A Better Tomorrow 2	John Woo	Chow Yun-fat, Emily Chu, Waise Lee	Hong Kong	
Bellman and True	Richard Loncraine	Bernard Hill, Kieran O'Brien, Richard Hope	United Kingdom	
The Big Town	Ben Bolt	Matt Dillon, Diane Lane, Tommy Lee Jones	United States	Crime drama
City on Fire	Ringo Lam	Chow Yun-fat, Sun Yueh, Danny Lee	Hong Kong	
Dernier Ete A Tanger	Alexandre Arcady	Valeria Golino, Thierry Lhermitte, Roger Hanin	France; Italy	
House of Games	David Mamet	Lindsay Crouse, Joe Mantegna, Mike Nussbaum	United States	Crime thriller
Just Heroes	John Woo	Stephen Chow, Danny Lee	Hong Kong	
Night Zoo	Jean-Claude Lauzon	Roger Le Bel, Gilles Maheu, Lynne Adams	Canada; France	Crime drama
No Man's Land	Peter Werner	Charlie Sheen, D. B. Sweeney, Randy Quaid	United States	
Prison on Fire	Ringo Lam	Chow Yun-fat, Tony Leung Kar-Fai, Roy Cheung	China; Hong Kong	Prison film
Raising Arizona	Joel Coen	Nicolas Cage, Holly Hunter, Trey Wilson	United States	Crime comedy
Rampage	William Friedkin	Michael Biehn, Alex McArthur, Nicholas Campbell	United States	
A Short Film About Killing	Krzysztof Kieślowski	Mirosław Baka, Krzysztof Globisz, Jan Tesarz	Poland	Crime drama
The Sicilian	Michael Cimino	Christopher Lambert, Terence Stamp, Joss Ackland	United States	
Slam Dance	Wayne Wang	Tom Hulce, Mary Elizabeth Mastrantonio, Virginia Madsen	United Kingdom; United States	Crime drama
Someone to Watch Over Me	Ridley Scott	Tom Berenger, Mimi Rogers	United States	Crime thriller
Street Smart	Jerry Schatzberg	Christopher Reeve, Morgan Freeman	United States	Crime drama
Throw Momma from the Train	Danny DeVito	Danny DeVito, Billy Crystal, Anne Ramsey	United States	Crime comedy
The Untouchables	Brian De Palma	Kevin Costner, Sean Connery, Robert De Niro, Andy García, Charles Martin Smith, Patricia Clarkson, Billy Drago, Richard Bradford, Jack Kehoe, Clifton James	United States	
Wisdom	Emilio Estevez	Emilio Estevez, Demi Moore, Tom Skerritt, Veronica Cartwright	United States	
1988
As Tears Go By	Wong Kar-wai	Andy Lau, Jacky Cheung, Maggie Cheung	Hong Kong	
The Blue Iguana	John J. Lafia	Dylan McDermott, Jessica Harper, James Russo	United States	
Call Me	Sollace Mitchell	Patricia Charbonneau, Stephen McHattie, Boyd Gaines	United States	
De Bruit et de Fureur	Jean-Claude Brisseau	Bruno Cremer, François Négret, Vincent Gasperitsch	France	Juvenile delinquency film, crime drama
Deja Vu	Juliusz Machulski	Jerzy Sztur, Vladimir Golovin, Nikolai Karachentsov	Poland; Soviet Union	
Dirty Rotten Scoundrels	Frank Oz	Steve Martin, Michael Caine	United States	Crime comedy
The Drifter	Larry Brand	Kim Delaney, Timothy Bottoms, Al Shannon	United States	
A Fish Called Wanda	Charles Crichton	John Cleese, Jamie Lee Curtis, Kevin Kline	United Kingdom; United States	Crime comedy
The Fruit Machine	Philip Saville	Emile Charles, Tony Forsyth, Robert Stephens	United Kingdom	
Kansas	David Stevens	Matt Dillon, Andrew McCarthy, Leslie Hope	United States	
L.A. Heat	Joseph Merhi	Jim Brown, Kevin Benton, Pat Johnson	United States	
Maniac Cop	William Lustig	Tom Atkins, Bruce Campbell, Laurene Landon	United States	Crime thriller
Married to the Mob	Jonathan Demme	Michelle Pfeiffer, Matthew Modine, Dean Stockwell, Mercedes Ruehl, Alec Baldwin, Joan Cusack, Oliver Platt, Nancy Travis, Tracey Walter, Chris Isaak, Charles Napier	United States	
Mississippi Burning	Alan Parker	Gene Hackman, Willem Dafoe, Frances McDormand	United States	Crime thriller
Stormy Monday	Mike Figgis	Melanie Griffith, Tommy Lee Jones, Sting	United Kingdom	
Story of Women	Claude Chabrol	Isabelle Huppert, François Cluzet, Marie Trintignant	France	Crime drama
Tequila Sunrise	Robert Towne	Mel Gibson, Michelle Pfeiffer, Kurt Russell, Raúl Juliá, J. T. Walsh, Arliss Howard, Budd Boetticher	United States	
Things Change	David Mamet	Don Ameche, Joe Mantegna	United States	
1989
Batman	Tim Burton	Michael Keaton, Jack Nicholson, Kim Basinger	United States	Master criminal film
Les Bois Noirs	Jacques Deray	Béatrice Dalle, Stéphane Freiss, Philippe Volter	France	Crime drama
City War	Sun Chung	Chow Yun-fat, Ti Lung	Hong Kong	Crime thriller
Cookie	Susan Seidelman	Peter Falk, Dianne Wiest, Emily Lloyd	United States	Gangster film, crime comedy
Criminal Law	Martin Campbell	Gary Oldman, Kevin Bacon, Karen Young	United States	
Dead Bang	John Frankenheimer	Don Johnson, Penelope Ann Miller, William Forsythe	United States	
Disorganized Crime	M. James Kouf Jr.	Hoyt Axton, Corbin Bernsen, Rubén Blades	United States	
Drugstore Cowboy	Gus Van Sant	Matt Dillon, Kelly Lynch	United States	Crime drama
Family Business	Sidney Lumet	Sean Connery, Dustin Hoffman, Matthew Broderick	United States	
For Queen and Country	Martin Stellman	Denzel Washington, Amanda Redman, George Baker	United Kingdom	Crime drama
Harlem Nights	Eddie Murphy	Eddie Murphy, Richard Pryor, Redd Foxx	United States	Crime comedy
Johnny Handsome	Walter Hill	Mickey Rourke, Ellen Barkin, Elizabeth McGovern	United States}	
The Killer	John Woo	Chow Yun-fat, Danny Lee, Sally Yeh	Hong Kong	
Mapantsula	Oliver Schmitz	Thomas Mogotlane, Marcel Van Heerden, Thembi Mtshali	South Africa; United Kingdom	Crime drama
Miracles	Jackie Chan	Jackie Chan, Anita Mui, Richard Ng	Hong Kong	Crime comedy
Monsieur Hire	Patrice Leconte	Michel Blanc, Sandrine Bonnaire, Luc Thuillier	France	Crime drama
Night Game	Peter Masterson	Roy Scheider, Karen Young, Richard Bradford	United States	
Relentless	William Lustig	Judd Nelson, Robert Loggia, Leo Rossi	United States	
Street of No Return	Samuel Fuller	Keith Carradine, Valentina Vargas, Bill Duke	France; Portugal; United States	
Violent Cop	Beat Takeshi Kitano	Beat Takeshi Kitano, Sei Hiraizumi, Maiko Kawakami	Japan	Crime thriller
We're No Angels	Neil Jordan	Robert De Niro, Sean Penn, Demi Moore	United States	Crime comedy
