= Dexter (Dexter episode) =

- Dexter episode
- Dexter Morgan (Michael C. Hall) riding the Slice of Life in the opening scene.
- Episode no.: Season 1 Episode 1
- Directed by: Michael Cuesta
- Written by: James Manos Jr.
- Production code: 101
- Original air date: October 1, 2006

Guest appearances
- C. S. Lee as Vince Masuka; Margo Martindale as Camilla Figg; Dominic Janes as Young Dexter Morgan

Episode chronology
← Previous —	Next → "Crocodile"
- Dexter (season 1)

"Dexter" is the pilot episode of the American television series Dexter and the first episode overall. It first premiered on October 1, 2006 on Showtime in the United States. The episode was written by series creator James Manos Jr. and directed by Michael Cuesta. It was based on the opening of the 2004 novel Darkly Dreaming Dexter by Jeff Lindsay. The episode introduces the series' protagonist, Dexter Morgan (Michael C. Hall), a Miami Metro Police Department blood spatter analyst with a double life as a serial killer. While solving murders in the Homicide division, Dexter also spends his time hunting and killing murderers and criminals who have escaped the justice system.

The crew began filming the pilot in Miami, but were unable to finish due to the overlap of production with the hurricane season. In spite of a subsidy from the state of Florida, the crew moved to Los Angeles, where the remainder of filming took place. "Dexter" was watched by over one million viewers, giving Showtime its highest ratings in almost two years. Critical reception of the pilot was mostly positive, with praise centering on the strong acting from the entire cast, compelling story, and set design, though Dexter's narration was often criticized and some questioned whether portraying a serial killer in a heroic light was tasteful or entertaining.

In 2007, CBS announced that it would broadcast the show over the public airwaves, which sparked controversy with the Parents Television Council (PTC). The PTC did not want the show to be broadcast because it "compelled viewers to empathize with a serial killer"; in response, CBS replaced expletives, cut out bloody scenes and gave the show a TV-14 rating. The eventual premiere of the show on CBS was on February 17, 2008, and was watched by 8.1 million viewers.

== Plot ==
Dexter Morgan stalks Miami's Ocean Drive and kidnaps Mike Donovan, a local pastor. Dexter takes Donovan to a remote cabin in the Everglades, where he confronts Donovan with evidence of the latter's serial murders of young boys. After being sedated, Donovan awakes to find himself strapped to a table. Dexter collects a sample of Donovan's blood before he proceeds to kill him. After dumping the remains, Dexter narrates that he is not sure why he feels the need to kill and believes he is emotionally detached from other people. Back at his apartment, he stores the microscopic slide containing Donovan's blood in a case containing other samples. He explains that he kills according to a moral code taught to him by his foster father Harry Morgan, who, as a Miami police detective, taught Dexter to kill only those who "deserve it". Flashbacks reveal that Harry first decided to impart these "lessons" upon Dexter after discovering that the boy had been killing neighborhood pets.

Dexter is contacted by his foster sister Debra (Jennifer Carpenter), a vice officer in the Miami Metro Police Department. Dexter, a blood spatter analyst for the department, assists Debra in investigating an apparent serial killer targeting prostitutes. Dexter examines the latest victim and is shocked to find no trace of blood on the dismembered corpse. At the police station, he discusses another murder case being handled by James Doakes (Erik King), a detective who dislikes him. Later, Dexter stalks Jamie Jaworski, a murderer who escaped justice due to a faulty warrant, and breaks into his home to find evidence, confirming Jaworski's guilt. Dexter meets with his girlfriend Rita Bennett (Julie Benz), a former victim of domestic abuse; Rita has two young children, Astor and Cody. While on a date with Rita, Dexter finds another murder scene with no traces of blood, this time with the victim's head missing. Dexter theorizes that the killer murders his victims in extreme cold, explaining the absence of blood, and might be using a stolen refrigerated truck. Dexter allows Debra to pitch the theory, but their superior officer, Lt. María LaGuerta (Lauren Vélez), dismisses it.

Dexter captures Jaworski, who admits his guilt and explains that he has no remorse for his act; Dexter responds by saying he has no remorse for what he is going to do to him. After killing Jaworski, he drives to see Rita but is sidetracked when he sees a refrigerated truck. Dexter follows the truck, and the driver throws a severed head at his car. Dexter arrives at Rita's apartment, where Rita — despite previously expressing no interest in sex due to her history of abuse — expresses interest in taking their relationship to a more intimate level. Dexter feels uncomfortable and is saved when Cody gets sick next door and needs his mother to pick him up. When Dexter arrives home, he finds a doll's head glued to his refrigerator door. Inside the freezer, he finds the other parts of the doll, severed just like the bloodless bodies of the dead women. Dexter views the doll as an invitation to play, which he gladly accepts.

== Production ==
=== Development ===
Showtime began developing the series at the start of 2005, planning for it to be based on the novel by Jeff Lindsay. By February, Emmy-winning writer James Manos Jr. (a writer for The Sopranos) was on board to write the pilot script with John Goldwyn, with Sara Colleton as executive producer. By June 13, 2005, Showtime had given the show a greenlight to be aired for the next year. The premise of the episode follows the same storyline as Jeff Lindsay's novel Darkly Dreaming Dexter, the first in the series of novels on which the television show is based, albeit with many additional elements and altered characters.

=== Casting ===
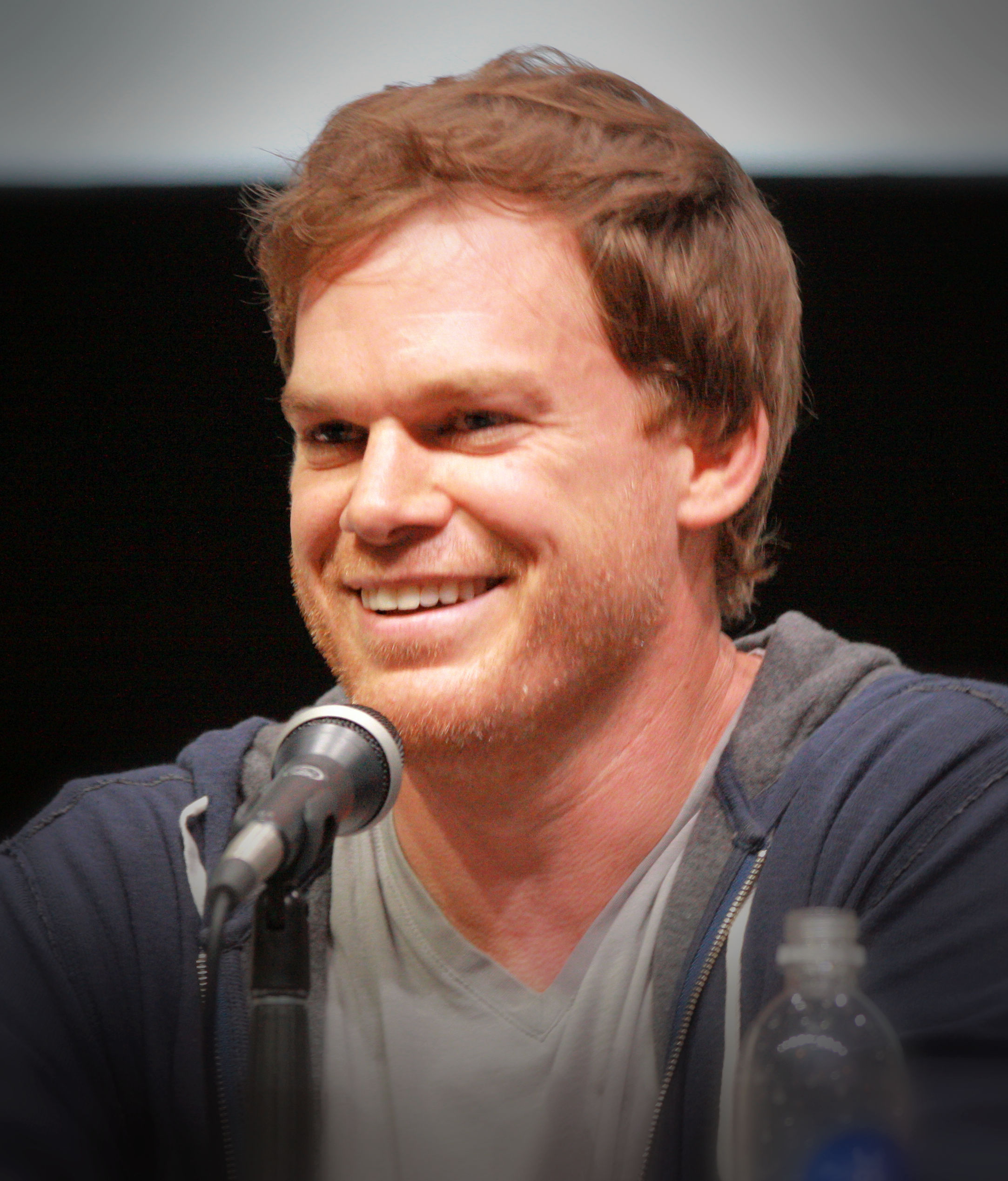
"I took a couple of weeks to consider the role, read the book as I knew the first series would be based on the book and wrap my mind around making an open-ended commitment to playing a character who thankfully is phenomenally complex and interesting. [...] It was a commitment I didn’t want to make lightly." —Michael C. Hall

Michael C. Hall received the script for Dexter in July 2005, after just having finished the fifth and final season of HBO's Six Feet Under. Hall was one of the few cast members not to audition for their roles; Robert Greenblatt and Michael Cuesta approached him with the script. Hall said that he didn't think "the role was created with me in mind but I think that once the pilot script emerged at Showtime, both Robert Greenblatt and Michael Cuesta independently thought of me for the role and then approached me about it."

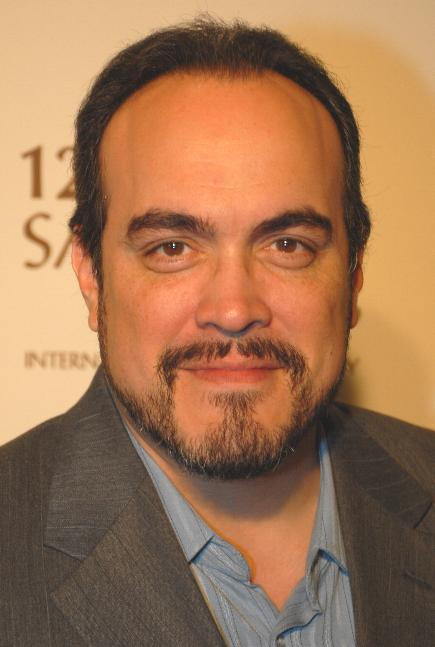
"When I first read the pilot of the show, I remember thinking it was really interesting, well written, and well structured. I didn’t know how people would receive it, but as an actor you don’t think too much about those things. You just see a good project and want to be involved in it, and that’s what Dexter was." —David Zayas

Hall was in New York City and thinking of going back to theatre work, and had no intention of returning to television so quickly. However, he changed his mind after reading the script, because he was "intrigued by the macabre mix of dark humor, chilling violence, and a unique central character." He also said that he "realized it was a big commitment and certainly appreciated that coming off of Six Feet Under" but said that he "couldn't pass it up". Lindsay was initially against casting Hall, based on seeing him on Six Feet Under, but after he saw Hall speak one line of the script, Lindsay changed his mind, describing Hall as "absolutely perfect" to portray Dexter. To prepare for the part, Hall read various books on the psychology of serial killers, read transcripts of interviews with serial killers, and spent time with the head blood-spatter analyst at the Miami precinct. He also watched people in New York restaurants to get a feel for what it would be like to stalk them.

Julie Benz was given a copy of the script in 2005, and was asked to audition for the part of Rita Bennett. She was surprised she was asked to audition, because the script was "one of the best pilot scripts [she] ever read." She also read for the part of Debra, and joked that she would have auditioned for Dexter's role had she been able to. Benz had been a "disgustingly huge" fan of Michael C. Hall from his role in Six Feet Under and she said in an interview with Vanity Fair that "I was such a fan of his from Six Feet Under, to the point where my cell-phone ring was the show’s theme song. I had to change it once I got cast!". The script was also presented to James Remar, who auditioned for the part of Harry Morgan, because it was a character he "really related to" and had waited for most of his life to play.

30s, Caucasian, good looking, with a mischievous twinkle in his eye. He's unassuming and can blend into a crowd, yet charming when need be. He's a student of human nature and from that he has a sense of wonder about the world. Dexter is a clever sociopath who believes himself unlovable and is convinced he has no human feelings; however, he's an excellent actor whose agreeable, socially conventional demeanor belies the emptiness and rage inside.

— Casting Notice for Dexter Morgan

As a former police officer, actor David Zayas was immediately interested in the role of Sgt. Angel Batista. After appearing in Oz for a season, Erik King, was looking for a "different" acting chance, he "loved" the character of Sgt. Doakes, after reading the script. South Korean actor C. S. Lee, who has a recurring role on the show as forensics specialist Vince Masuka, was asked for the part after Dexter producers recognized him in guest parts on Spin City, Law & Order: Criminal Intent and The Sopranos. Lee accepted the part because of the "fantastic" writing. By September 15, Jennifer Carpenter had joined the cast to play the part of Debra Morgan. Carpenter had enough time before her audition to read the Dexter books, but admitted that she "didn’t exactly see myself in the books. I knew that it was going to be a TV show and that it had the potential to go for five to seven years, so I tried to make Deb as similar to me as possible and to bring out the parts of myself that were like Deb. I think that may have helped in the audition and it has certainly helped sustain such a long run with one character." She also stated that she enjoyed cursing on television, but found it hard to stop it creeping into her real life. In June 2006 Geoff Pierson was cast as Cpt. Matthews.

The series stars Lauren Vélez as María LaGuerta, David Zayas as Angel Batista and Erik King as James Doakes, all previously starred in the American HBO television drama series Oz.

=== Filming, editing and cinematography ===
I have always been drawn to shows that have a dark theme. What’s interesting to me about Dexter is that it features a character who is extremely disturbed and yet is trying to present himself as someone normal; he says and does all the right things. When his dark side takes over, you are totally in his psychotic world. The intersection where these two things meet makes for a lot of tension.

— Elena Maganini

Filming of the episode took place in Miami and Los Angeles. Shooting began on the first episode on September 18, 2005. The network took advantage of the Florida Film Commission incentive program which provided a 15% rebate of all money spent in Florida on the production (which was up to $2 million) to encourage film and television production in the state. The incentive was first launched in 2003, and was refunded by the state legislature for 2006 with $10 million, its largest budget to date. President of Entertainment at Showtime, Robert Greenblatt said "I've always felt that location is a strong starring character and adds to the success of many shows."

Michael has a visual style that is quite distinctive. For example, in the scene where Dexter and his sister are at Jimbo’s Crab Shack, Michael shot standard coverage as one piece. But then there were all these other bits of business—drifting down from faces to the food, the condensation on a glass while Dexter talks about a killer using a refrigeration truck. These are ways of making more out of the conversation than the literal stuff they’re talking about. That’s the kind of thing Michael does to tell the story––and it makes it much more interesting.

— Elena Maganini about Michael Cuesta

The crew originally wanted to shoot the entire pilot in Miami, but during the first two weeks of filming, three hurricanes went by: Katrina, Rita, and Wilma. Since further filming was to take place during the hurricane season, and it was not possible to get insurance, the crew was forced to move elsewhere. Though the state of Florida offered a US$450,000 subsidy, the Dexter crew relocated to Los Angeles. Executive producer Sara Colleton explained that the filming crew tried to create a different version of Miami in Los Angeles, that differed from the "glossy look" Miami has in CSI: Miami and Miami Vice. "Dexter" was shot in HD; cinematographer Romeo Tirone said he experienced some difficulties because HD "sees everything." As opposed to Dexter's "disturbing" environment, Tirone tried to give Rita's home a "warmer, safer, happier place" with "a dark side to it," doing so by letting more light come through the windows. Editor Elena Maganini was contacted by episode director Michael Cuesta after he saw her previous work with director John McNaughton; Maganini had previously worked on a serial killer movie entitled Henry: Portrait of a Serial Killer. Michael Cuesta said that when he met Elena he "...thought she had great instincts, was relaxed and didn’t pretend to know exactly who this character was. " He said that "...that, and all her work with John McNaughton, helped convince me to bring her onto the pilot. She’s done serial killers; she’s done noirs. She gets that world. "

Veteran television editor Scott K. Wallace was hired later, on Maganini's suggestion. Wallace and Maganini had already worked with each other on Tarzan. They worked on the flashback sequences in the episode, which they tried to make "very dreamlike," identifying as Dexter's "Dark Passenger," which urges Dexter to kill as explained in Lindsay's novels. After the pilot was filmed, the footage filmed in Miami was mixed with the footage of Los Angeles.

=== Shooting locations ===
==== Miami ====
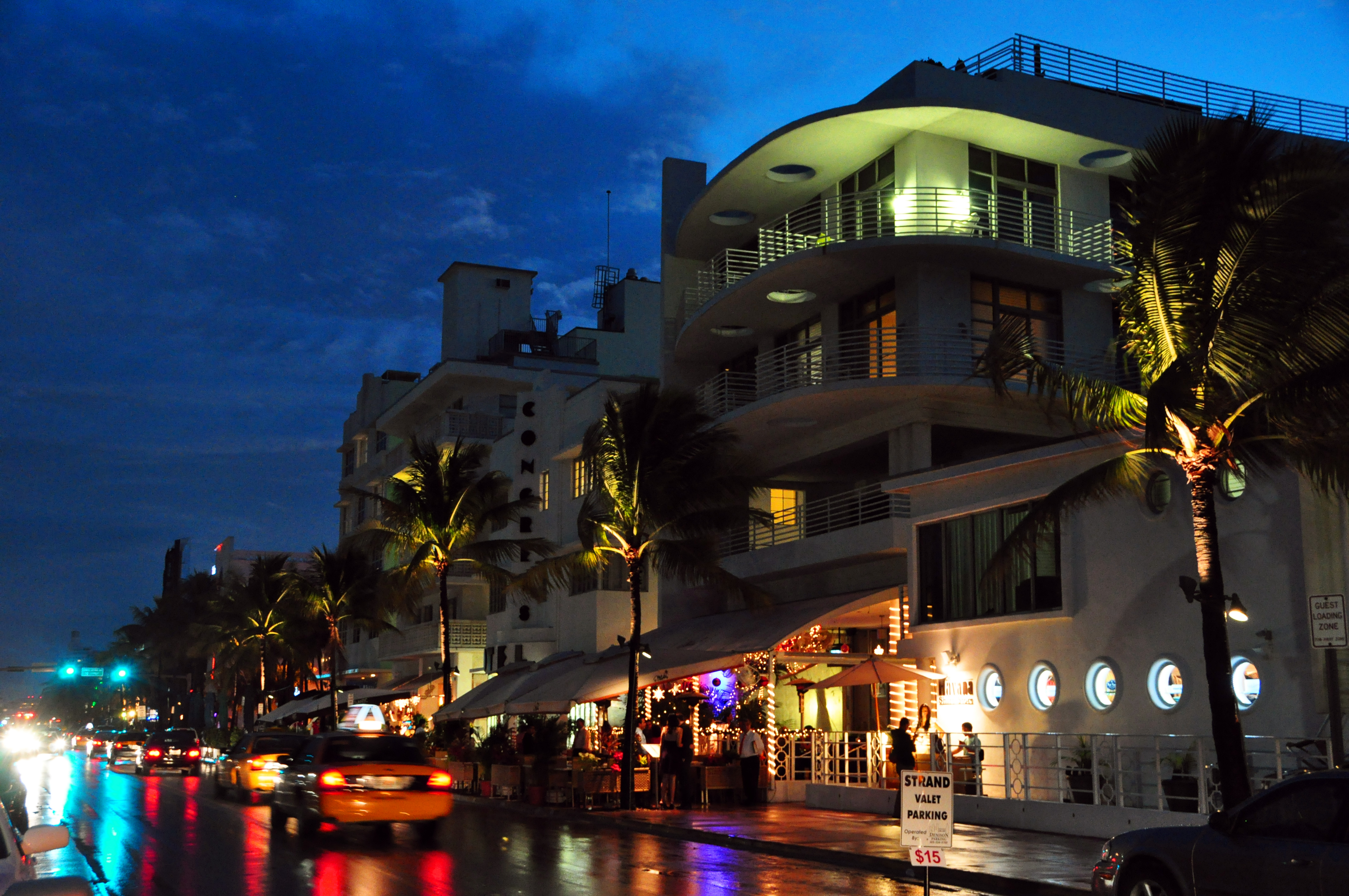
View of Ocean Drive at night, a location heavily used in the series

The first scene, with Dexter cruising through the Miami streets, was filmed on location, along Ocean Drive in South Beach. They used Ocean Drive again for the scene in which Dexter strolls through the streets with an ice cream, before meeting with Rita and once more, in the same street, for the next episode, Crocodile, for the scene whereby Dexter and Debra find the Ice truck killer's truck. They also used a gazebo in a park in Miami Springs, Florida, located around seven miles northwest of Miami, for the boy choir scene in which shortly after the choir ends, Dexter kidnaps Mike Donovan. They used several water locations in Miami, to illustrate Dexter on his boat, the "Slice of Life". These locations include Biscayne Bay and Virginia Key island (used for the flashbacks of the 8-year old Dexter, talking with Harry about his homicidal tendencies, and then later re-used in Crocodile). The condo used to portray Dexter's apartment is also in Miami. The Seven Seas Motel is an actual location and they didn't change the name for the motel. There is genuinely a pool outside and the room 105 was rented for the day for them to shoot in it. They also shot in Doral Park Country Club to portray the valet station where Jaworski works.

==== Los Angeles ====
The house used for Rita's abode is actually in Long Beach, California, and is in a residential area known as Los Altos. The Los Altos neighborhood has been used extensively in shooting Dexter. The team used 6 different homes in that area alone in the first season: Dexter's childhood home, Angel's house, the house of the neighbor with the noisy dog, the Dade City house that Dexter inherits from his biological father, and the house of the old lady across the street. It is also close to the intersection where the "Ice Truck Killer" stopped his car to check on his captive (Debra) in the car trunk.

=== Promotion ===
As promotion for the show, Showtime posted a preview of the pilot on their website. In September 2006, CBS and YouTube struck a strategic content and advertising partnership, and the YouTube CBS Brand Channel started including daily contributions from the Showtime network, including promotional video clips from its critically acclaimed original series, such as Dexter. On October 28, after the first few episodes had aired, Showtime made it easier for viewers to catch up with the show by dedicating a whole night to showing the first five episodes.

== CBS broadcast controversy ==
In December 2007, CBS announced that it was considering Dexter for broadcast over the public airwaves, making Dexter the first show in 20 years to air on a broadcast network after it had been shown on a premium cable channel. However, the Parents Television Council (PTC) publicly protested the decision, because of the show's graphic violence. In a 2008 press release, PTC president Tim Winter stated the following:

We are formally asking CBS to cancel its plan to air the first season of Dexter on its television network. This show is not suitable for airing on broadcast television; it should remain on a premium subscription cable network. The biggest problem with the series is something that no amount of editing can get around: the series compels viewers to empathize with a serial killer, to root for him to prevail, to hope he doesn’t get discovered. Dexter introduces audiences to the depths of depravity and indifference as it chronicles the main character's troubled quest for vigilante justice by celebrating graphic, premeditated murder.

— Tim Winter, president of the Parents Television Council

Although some critics objected to Dexter's edited broadcast, CBS, in response to the PTC, moved it up to a later timeslot and replaced expletives, using substitutes such as "frickin'" and "mother lover". Also, the scene in the car, in which Dexter inappropriately touches Rita thinking of bloodless bodies was removed. In addition, bloody scenes were cut out by the network, as well as giving the show a TV-14 Rating. While the PTC was still against CBS airing the episode, CBS eventually broadcast the episode on February 17, 2008.

== Reception ==
=== Ratings and viewership ===
The pilot premiered on October 1, 2006. It was watched by 603,000 viewers, the highest audience numbers for a Showtime series premiere since Fat Actress aired in March 2005. Dexter bested the series premieres of Weeds, Brotherhood, Sleeper Cell and Huff. An encore from 10:00 to 11:00, one hour after the initial broadcast, brought in 443,000 viewers, bringing the total number of viewers to over a million, giving Showtime its highest ratings in nearly two years. The edited version of the pilot episode that was broadcast on CBS on February 17, 2008, was watched by 8.1 million viewers, finishing third in its timeslot and giving CBS its best ratings in the 10 p.m. timeslot since December 2007. Just under 300,000 viewers watched Dexter's premiere on FX in the United Kingdom, on July 10, 2007. On July 7, 2008 Dexter premiered in Australia on Network Ten, where it was watched by a little less than a million viewers, finishing highest in the 18–49, 16-39 and 25-54 demographics.

=== Critical reaction ===
Reviews of the pilot were generally positive. David Hinckley of the New York Daily News called it "bold, different and exciting, with a central character and performance that take your breath away". Hinckley praised Hall's performance as dynamic and Emmy-worthy, and the narration as "indispensable and haunting". Maureen Ryan of the Chicago Tribune claimed "to deny yourself the engrossing Dexter based on its subject matter would be to miss out on one of television's most fiendishly intelligent new dramas." Ryan enjoyed the series' black comedy aspects, which she thought were "infused with the most pitch-dark irony on television". Matthew Gilbert of The Boston Globe was impressed by Hall's performance, especially in his ability to make Dexter likable. Gilbert praised the set designers, comparing the crime scenes to a Vanity Fair photo spread.

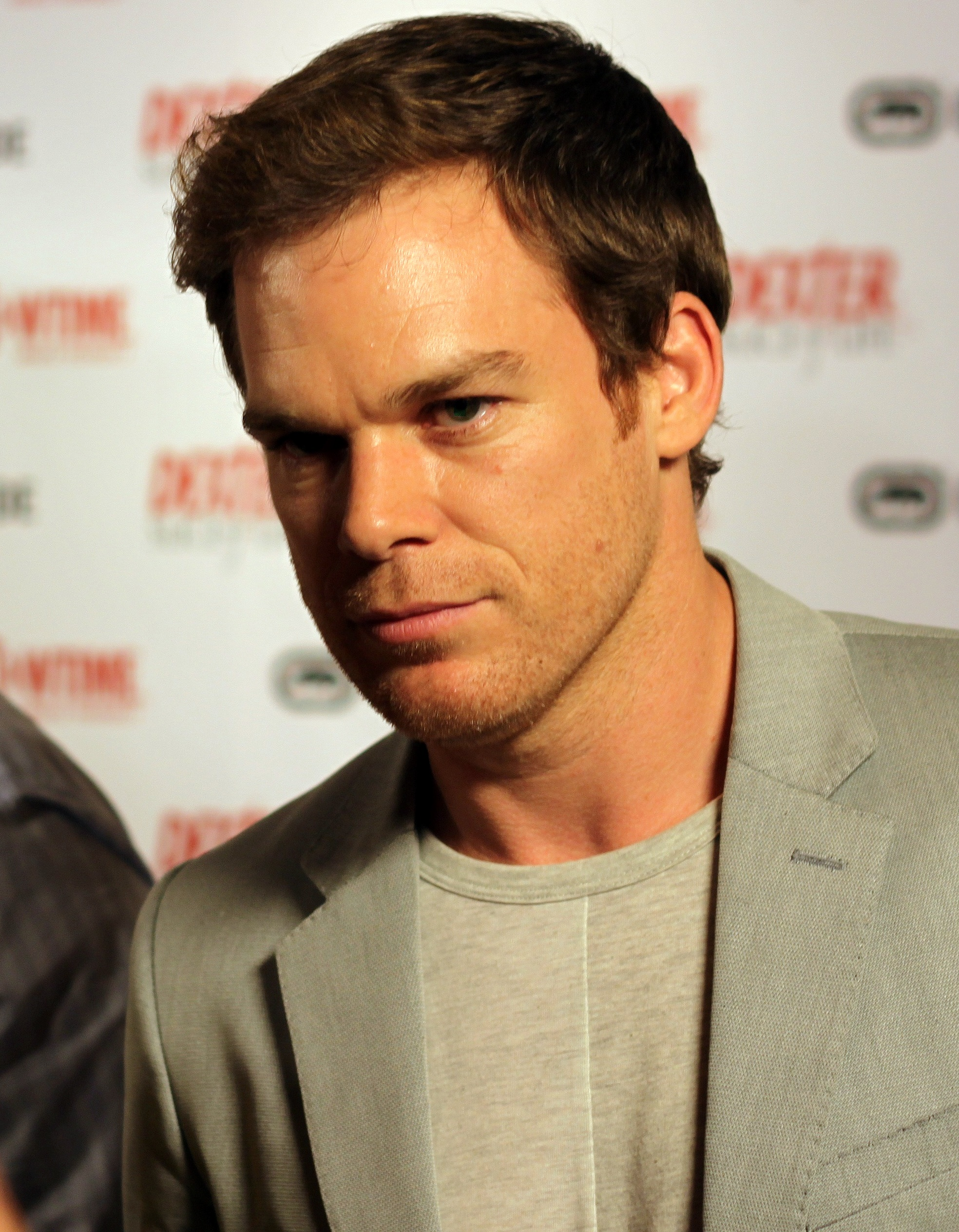
Michael C. Hall received rave reviews for his portrayal of Dexter.

Slant Magazine's Ed Gonzalez was unimpressed with the character of Dexter, saying the show "meticulously and dubiously qualifies its twisted gimmick, asking us to put stock in a serial killer (yikes!) only to reveal that he murders only those who have taken from society (aww!)," and that Dexter's narration is trite and fails to say anything that the good acting does not already convey. Entertainment Weekly's Josh Wolk called him "the hippest-looking killer since American Psycho's Patrick Bateman". The San Francisco Chronicle's Tim Goodman said "What makes the series work so well is twofold. Hall is magnificent; it's another sterling performance from him. But instead of being pent up yet emotionally explosive, like his David Fisher on Six Feet Under, he's cool and calculated and entirely without compassion as Dexter. That makes him alluring, in a strange way." Ryan found him to be "among the more compelling characters on the small screen." Gilbert described Dexter as a cross between Hannibal Lecter and Clarice Starling, calling him a vigilante obsessive murderer with a slippery personality, but "also a hero of sorts." InsidePulse.com reviewer Mathan Erhardt said that the episode did not quite meet his expectations, and in a reversal of Gonzalez, opined that Dexter's narration is necessary but grating. He praised Hall's performance for being distinct from his character in Six Feet Under and finished the review, "Dexter, despite it's [sic] flaws is yet another reason why Sunday night is one of my favorite nights to watch TV."

IGN gave the pilot episode an "Outstanding" rating of 9 out of 10. Reviewer Dan Iverson argued in favor of the narration, saying that it is creepy and is the only way that the audience can come to know Dexter or understand the reasoning behind his actions, and said that Dexter successfully inhabits a moral gray area. IGN reviewer Matt Fowler later placed Mike Donovan third on a list of "Dexter's Top 10 Kills", saying he "wasn't Dexter first dead body, but he was our televisual introduction into Dexter's wicked world of revenge and reckoning." IGN also declared the show the "Best New Psycho Drama of 2006".

TVSquad reviewer Jonathon Toomey gave the first episode 9 out of 10 and said of it that "This show is legit, well-worth watching." He praised Hall's performance as moving chameleon-like between different personas, and said that some of the supporting cast nonetheless managed steal some of the scenes. He cited the flashback scenes of Dexter as a child as a highlight, and key to making the character sympathetic. Toomey later added another review of the premiere, again mentioning the strength of the supporting cast. He argued that despite the controversial subject matter, the gore in the episode is not significantly worse than that seen on popular programs such as House and the various CSI shows.

However, not all reviews were as positive. Robert Abele of LA Weekly thought the pilot was average, containing "fashionable gore, occasionally witty dialogue, serviceable suspense and boilerplate police-department politics." Abele felt that the series was a superhero tale, rather than the dark comedy, police thriller and brooding drama that it was promoted to be. Brian Lowry of Variety did not think that Dexter would impress critics, and said, "antics of the deranged ... aren't really all that pleasant to watch." He praised Hall's acting, saying that he "... quickly dispatches any thoughts of his "Six Feet" character, which, by itself, represents quite an accomplishment.", but argued that while the show's usage of gore is relatively restrained, conceptually it is sometimes distasteful rather than edgy. Nancy DeWolf Smith of The Wall Street Journal felt that the "grotesqueries of Dexter are not something that can easily be dismissed with the old 'you don't have to watch' line. We don't have to watch. We do have to live among the viewers who will be desensitized, or aroused, by this show."

=== Accolades ===
Elena Maganini won a Creative Arts Primetime Emmy Award in 2007 for Outstanding Single Camera Picture Editing for a Drama Series. Also, the episode was nominated for two Artios Awards, for Best Dramatic Pilot Casting and Best Dramatic Episodic Casting. The nominees for the Best Dramatic Pilot Casting were Deborah Aquila, Mary Tricia Wood, Jennifer L. Smith, Julie Tucker (for the New York City casting), and Lori Wyman (for the Florida casting).

Awards and nominations
Award	Year	Category	Nominee(s)	Result	Ref.
Artios Award	2007	Best Dramatic Pilot Casting	Deborah Aquila, Mary Tricia Wood, Jennifer L. Smith, Julie Tucker, Lori Wyman	Nominated	
Artios Award	2007	Best Dramatic Episodic Casting	Shawn Dawson, Lori S. Wyman	Nominated	
Primetime Emmy Award	2007	Outstanding Single Camera Picture Editing for a Drama Series	Elena Maganini	Won	
