= Elena Maganini =

Film and television editor (1955/1956–2026)

- Born: 1955 or 1956; Chicago, Illinois, U.S.
- Died: October 21, 2026 (aged 70)
- Education: University of Illinois Urbana-Champaign; Columbia College Chicago
- Occupations: Film and television editor
- Notable work: Henry: Portrait of a Serial Killer; Wild Things; Dexter
- Spouse: Scott Collins

Elena Maganini (1955 or 1956 – October 21, 2026) was an American film and television editor, best known for her work on the first season of the Showtime drama series Dexter.

== Life and career ==
Maganini was born in Chicago. She graduated from the University of Illinois Urbana-Champaign and studied film at Columbia College Chicago.

She started out working on commercials in Chicago for Sinnot & Associates, and then moved on to her first feature, Henry: Portrait of a Serial Killer, for which she was not only editor but also sound editor. On Henry: Portrait of a Serial Killer, she collaborated with John McNaughton, a teaming that continued through a series of projects, often themed around sexuality, such as Sex, Drugs, Rock & Roll, Mad Dog and Glory, Push, Nevada and 1998 thriller Wild Things. She was nominated for an award for the HBO miniseries If These Walls Could Talk, in the category of Outstanding Single Camera Editing for a Miniseries or Special.

Maganini met the pinnacle of her career when she was contacted by episode director Michael Cuesta for the Showtime TV drama series Dexter. She worked on 6 episodes of Dexter and won a Primetime Emmy Award in 2007 for Outstanding Single Camera Picture Editing for a Drama Series for the pilot episode, "Dexter". The other episodes she edited were "Crocodile", "Popping Cherry", "Return to Sender", "Father Knows Best", and "Born Free". Maganini, explaining why she took the job for Dexter, said that she had always been drawn to darker features:

I have always been drawn to shows that have a dark theme. What's interesting to me about Dexter is that it features a character who is extremely disturbed and yet is trying to present himself as someone normal; he says and does all the right things. When his dark side takes over, you are totally in his psychotic world. The intersection where these two things meet makes for a lot of tension.

— Elena Maganini

She was a member of American Cinema Editors. Maganini was married to Scott Collins, a Motion Picture Editors Guild communications director. She died on October 21, 2026, at the age of 70.

== Filmography ==
Year	Film/Show	Notes
1986	Henry: Portrait of a Serial Killer	
1991	The Borrower	
1991	Sex, Drugs, Rock & Roll	Documentary
1992	Eyes of the Prey	
1992	How Blue Can You Get?	
1993	Mad Dog and Glory	
1994	Somebody to Love	
1995	Four Rooms	
1996	Normal Life	
1996	Infinity	
1996	If These Walls Could Talk	Nominated — Emmy Award for Outstanding Single Camera Editing for a Miniseries or Special
1998	Wild Things	
1998	Louis & Frank	
1999	Lansky	
2000	Next Friday	
2000	Condo Painting	Documentary
2000	In the Light of the Moon	
2001	Speaking of Sex	
2002	Push, Nevada	
2003	Expert Witness	
2003	Tarzan	
2004–2006	Dr. Vegas	3 episodes
2005	Book of Swords	
2005	8mm 2	
2006	Haskett's Chance	
2006	Dexter	6 episodes Won — Emmy Award for Outstanding Single Camera Picture Editing for a Drama Series for episode "Dexter"
2007	The Dead Zone	5 episodes
2008–2009	Eli Stone	6 episodes
2009	NY-LON	
2009–2010	Dollhouse	4 episodes
2010	Scoundrels	2 episodes
2010	90210	2 episodes
2021	Clarice	4 episodes
