= The Borrower =

1991 American science fiction horror film

- Theatrical release poster
- Directed by: John McNaughton
- Screenplay by: Mason Nage; Richard Fire
- Story by: Mason Nage
- Produced by: R.P. Sekon; Steven A. Jones
- Starring: Rae Dawn Chong; Don Gordon; Antonio Fargas
- Cinematography: Julio Macat; Robert New
- Edited by: Elena Maganini
- Music by: Robert McNaughton; Ken Hale; Steven A. Jones
- Production company: Vision Pictures
- Distributed by: Cannon Films
- Release dates: May 25, 1991 (SIFF); August 16, 1991 (Chicago)
- Running time: 91 minutes
- Country: United States
- Language: English

The Borrower is a 1991 American science fiction horror film directed by John McNaughton and starring Rae Dawn Chong, Tom Towles and Antonio Fargas. The story revolves around an alien serial killer, who is sent to Earth to live among humans as a form of penalty.

== Synopsis ==
An alien serial killer is sent to Earth to live among humans as a punishment for his crimes, and his body is genetically transformed to look like a human. Nevertheless, the transformation is incomplete and every few hours the alien's body begins to revert to its original form, causing his head to explode. The situation prompts the alien to "borrow" heads from anyone who happens to be nearby. He gets it by squeezing the head off with a crab-like claw and skewering it onto his own neck. At the same time, Detectives Pierce (Chong) and Krieger (Gordon) try to figure out who is causing the killing spree, with only one clue: all the heads of the victims have been removed and are lost. The team slowly comes to the conclusion that they are facing a rather unearthly killer.

== Cast ==
- Rae Dawn Chong as Diana Pierce
- Don Gordon as Charles Krieger
- Tom Towles as Bob Laney
- Antonio Fargas as Julius
- Neil Giuntoli as Scully
- Larry Pennell as Captain Scarcelli
- Tracy Arnold as Nurse

Tony Amendola has a small role as a doctor and Mädchen Amick briefly appears as a rock groupie. Pamela Norris cameos as a hooker.

== Production ==
Between making Henry: Portrait of a Serial Killer in 1986 and the release of The Borrower in 1990, director John McNaughton got sent numerous horror scripts, none of which he liked. In a 2017 interview he explained:

"When I got the script for The Borrower I was broke. (...) And I got sent bad script after bad script and then came The Borrower, which in some sense was also a bad script, but the conceit that this creature takes the heads off of people and somehow occupies their lives, to me it was like a metaphor for what actors do. That gave me something to take a hold of, other than just the monster that jumps up from behind a tree to scare you and eat you."

One of McNaughton's previous films (and one of the most well known and revered of his filmography), Henry: Portrait of a Serial Killer, is referenced in a poster that can be seen in one scene on a street. Also, a TV commercial can be overheard warning about the disturbing nature of the aforementioned film on a scene in the hospital.

The Borrower was originally produced from 1987 to December 1988 by Atlantic Entertainment Group, which went out of business "two weeks before [the film's completion]". A year later, project financier Lou Horowitz offered the film to Cannon Films' international branch. Its domestic division acquired the U.S. rights early in 1991.

== Release ==
After showing some reluctance over its release, Cannon leased out a print of The Borrower to Chicago's Music Box Theatre, whose booker Sandy Chaney had sought the film for two years, and where Henry: Portrait of a Serial Killer had run for 18 months. "When Cannon turned down the Music Box's request for a print, Chaney came up with a novel variation on the theme: The Music Box would advance Cannon the $1,500 required to strike a new print against 'rentals,' the box-office cut the company was due to receive. No investment would be required on Cannon's part. If the movie took off, the company would be riding high. If it failed, it would walk away with a free print." After enthusiastic response from the Music Box run, Cannon struck more prints for additional markets; the film was also shown at the 1991 Toronto International Film Festival (which the company previously turned down) as part of their Midnight Madness screenings.

Scream Factory announced the movie on Blu-ray.
