= Henry: Portrait of a Serial Killer, Part II =

- Poster artwork
- Directed by: Chuck Parello
- Written by: Chuck Parello
- Produced by: Waleed B. Ali; Malik B. Ali; Thomas J. Busch
- Starring: Neil Giuntoli; Rich Komenich; Kate Walsh
- Cinematography: Michael Kohnhorst
- Edited by: Tom Keefe
- Music by: Robert F. McNaughton
- Release date: 1996
- Running time: 84 minutes
- Country: United States
- Language: English

Henry: Portrait of a Serial Killer, Part II (also known as Henry: Portrait of a Serial Killer 2 - Mask of Sanity) is a 1996 horror film written and directed by Chuck Parello.

The film is the sequel to Henry: Portrait of a Serial Killer.

== Plot ==
Ten years after the events of previous film, serial killer Henry continues his killing spree when he takes a job at a port-o-john company where he meets two employees, Kai and his wife Cricket. They take pity on Henry when they learn that he is a homeless drifter and offer him a room in their home. Also staying with them is Kai and Cricket's emotionally fragile teenage niece, Louisa.

Henry learns that Kai has a side job as an arsonist-for-hire, setting up phony insurance scams to make money for their boss, Rooter. Henry agrees to join Kai and on one of their first outings, they discover two squatters in a building that's been marked for fire. It is then that Henry introduces Kai to his life's work of being a serial killer and the murders begin. Kai has never killed before, but he turns into a willing accomplice. Initially, the two men work well together. But as the killing sprees increase in their depravity, it's more than Kai can handle. He wants out, but he's in too deep with both his insurance scam with Rooter as well as being a murder accomplice with Henry.

In the meantime, Louisa develops a romantic crush on Henry, but he refuses to respond to her sexual advances. After Henry rejects Louisa's advances, she becomes more dangerously disturbed and suicidal. When Henry attends a gathering with Kai and Cricket at Rooter's house, he refuses to take recreational drugs until Rooter slips Henry a roofie in his drink, Henry passes out and wakes up later after the other guests leave. Angry that Rooter drugged him, Henry murders Rooter on the spur of the moment as well as his friend, which is against Henry's "code" never to murder people that he knows personally. Kai helps Henry dispose of the two bodies with Cricket finally seeing the side work that Henry and Kai have been doing. When the three of them return at Kai and Cricket's house, they find Louisa who kills herself in front of them.

Again on the spur of the moment, Henry takes the gun that Louisa used to kill herself and shoots both Kai and Cricket. Cricket dies while Kai is critically wounded. Henry takes the bodies to the basement of the house, pours gasoline all over the place and sets fire to the house allowing Kai to burn to death. Henry gets into Kai and Cricket's car and drives away into the night, alone once again to continue his killing spree as the house explodes and burns to the ground, again leaving no trace for the police to learn about Henry's existence.

== Cast ==
- Neil Giuntoli as Henry
- Rich Komenich as Kai
- Kate Walsh as Cricket
- Carri Levinson as Louisa
- Daniel Allar as Rooter
- Marlon Newson as Gene
- Marco Santucci as Casey
- Kevin Hurley as Lester
- Fran Smith as Woman On Couch
- Richard Henzel as Man Tied to Bed
- Penelope Milford as Woman In Woods, Henry's First Victim
- Leslie Zang as Liquor Store Girl #1
- Kam Heskin as Liquor Store Girl #2
- Kevin Sorensen as Gas Station Mechanic
- Mike Houlihan as The Bartender

== Production ==
The film was written, directed, and produced by Chuck Parello. Parello came across the first film when director John McNaughton gave him a copy of the film during his tenure as a reporter at Screen International. Upon watching the film, Parello was impressed and resigned from Screen and took a publicist position at MPI Home Video. He was responsible for helping spread awareness of Henry: Portrait of a Serial Killer by booking it at various film festivals. Parello continued to work alongside McNaughton and his producer Steve Jones until 1994 when Parello decided to take a more active role in moviemaking with his sights set on a Henry sequel.
