= Blood Link =

- Directed by: Alberto De Martino
- Screenplay by: Theodore Apstein
- Story by: Massimo De Rita; Alberto De Martino
- Starring: Michael Moriarty; Penelope Milford; Cameron Mitchell
- Cinematography: Romano Albani
- Edited by: Russel Lloyd
- Music by: Ennio Morricone
- Production company: Zadar Films
- Release date: 1982
- Country: Germany

Blood Link (German: Blood Link – Blutspur) is a 1982 film directed by Alberto De Martino and starring Michael Moriarty and Cameron Mitchell.

== Plot ==
Craig Mannings (Michael Moriarty) is a respected doctor living in the United States, who begins to experience strange visions of women being murdered. Before long, he begins to suspect that these visions are the result of a psychic connection with his twin brother Keith (also Michael Moriarty), who supposedly died in a house fire in Cleveland at the age of 17, but who is now engaged in a murder spree. Recognizing the scenery in one of the visions, Craig travels to Hamburg, Germany to find and stop his brother, over the protests of his girlfriend Julie Warren (Penelope Milford).

Meanwhile, Keith is soon spotted and mistaken for Craig at a Hamburg coffee shop by ex-boxer Bud Waldo, (Cameron Mitchell) one of Craig's former patients. Maliciously, Keith goads the older man into an impromptu boxing match, striking him repeatedly and causing a fatal heart attack. Craig arrives on the scene in time to meet Waldo's daughter Christine (Sarah Langenfeld), who joins him in his search for Keith. The two quickly become lovers, but their search is hampered by the local police (led by inspector Hessinger [Reinhold Olszewski]) who think Craig is to blame for Keith's murders. While they hide, Keith locates them, rapes and kills Christine, and finally confronts his brother, telling him he was aware of their psychic connection and that he committed the murders as a way of bringing his estranged brother to him. Craig condemns his actions, but Keith escapes, promising more murders. Shortly thereafter, the police arrive and arrest Craig, charging him with Christine's murder.

In short order, Julie arrives in Germany and—certain that Craig's visions are real—implores the local authorities in Hamburg to help search for Keith in connection to the murders that Craig is now being blamed for. Craig is exonerated once Keith kills a prostitute he saw regularly, then a cab driver. While Craig sits in jail, she concocts a plan to act as bait for Keith, meeting him at a secret location and counting on Craig's psychic connection to help bring the police to her in time. Keith, psychologically unstable and obsessed with his brother, rapes Julie and attempts to strangle her, but during the struggle she is able to stab him to death with his own knife.

Craig flashes back in his last vision and sees Keith killed their parents years ago. When Craig sees Keith’s body in the morgue, Keith possesses his body, in a vision where he shuts Craig into the morgue drawer. Keith sees Julie again, but when he kisses her, she realizes the truth from his mannerisms. The film ends with Keith raping Julie again in Craig’s body, Julie asking him who he is in terror.

== Cast ==
- Michael Moriarty as Keith Mannings / Craig Mannings
- Penelope Milford as Julie Warren
- Geraldine Fitzgerald as Mrs. Thomason
- Cameron Mitchell as Bud Waldo
- Sarah Langenfeld as Christine Waldo
- Martha Smith as Hedwig
- Virginia McKenna as Woman In Ballroom
- Reinhold Olszewski as Inspector Hessinger
- Alex Diakun as Mr. Adams
- Shaun Lawton as Man With Cigar
- Wendy Merk as Head Nurse

== Production ==
Blood Link was shot in the United States and Germany in late 1981. The film was financed mostly by a German production company (Zadar Films), but it was made by an Italian director and crew. Director Alberto De Martino said that the films he made in the 1980s were all made for the foreign markets. These films were all made with a pseudonym of Martin Herbert as Martino said he felt "a little ashamed" of them.

Martino said that working with actor Michael Moriarty was difficult, calling him "a ballbuster. At first he was all nice and happy, but then, right before the beginning of production, he changed." Martino said Moriarty wanted to change the script and made other "unreasonable requests."

== Release ==
Blood Link was released in 1982. The film was released in the United States on home video by Embassy as Blood Link and in the United Kingdom by Medusa as The Link. It was released in Italy as Extrasensorial in various locations such in 1986.

== Reception ==
From retrospective reviews, Adrian Luther Smith in his book on Italian genre films praised the acting of Michael Moriarty and stated that "those seeking well-presented sleazy thrills will not be disappointed". Italian film critic and historian Roberto Curti stated that the film has "several interesting moments" while being "partly marred for an unsatisfactory ending imposed on by the producer".
