= The Golden Seal =

- Directed by: Frank Zuniga
- Screenplay by: John Groves
- Based on: A River Ran Out of Eden by James Vance Marshall
- Produced by: Samuel Goldwyn Jr.
- Starring: Steve Railsback; Michael Beck; Penelope Milford; Torquil Campbell
- Cinematography: Eric Saarinen
- Edited by: Robert Q. Lovett
- Music by: Dana Kaproff; John Barry (themes)
- Distributed by: The Samuel Goldwyn Company
- Release date: August 19, 1983
- Running time: 94 minutes
- Country: United States
- Language: English

The Golden Seal is a 1983 American drama film directed by Frank Zuniga and starring Steve Railsback, Michael Beck, Penelope Milford and Torquil Campbell. It is based on James Vance Marshall’s 1962 novel A River Ran Out of Eden.

== Cast ==
- Steve Railsback as Jim Lee
- Michael Beck as Crawford
- Penelope Milford as Tania Lee
- Torquil Campbell as Eric Lee
- Seth Sakai as Semeyon
- Richard Narita as Alexei
- Sandra Seacat as Gladys
- Peter Anderson as Tom
- Terence Kelly as Mongo
- Tom Heaton as Man with Stutter

== Reception ==
Roger Ebert awarded the film two stars out of four. S. Jhoanna Robledo of Common Sense Media gave it three stars out of five.
