= Neil Giuntoli =

American actor active since 1987 (born 1959)

- Born: December 20, 1959 (age 66); Chicago, Illinois, United States
- Occupation: Actor

Neil Giuntoli (born December 20, 1959) is an American actor active since 1987, whose most famous role was in Child's Play (1988). Giuntoli is also the author and lead actor of the play Hizzoner, a fictional account of former Chicago mayor Richard J. Daley. The play received the longest run ever granted to a production at Chicago's Prop Theater and was critically well received.

== Biography ==
Giuntoli is an American actor and a native of Chicago. He is the great-great-great nephew of Anton Cermak, a former mayor of Chicago. He is Jewish. He grew up on Chicago's north side and attended Francis W. Parker High School, after which he joined the Navy and was stationed in Korea as a translator. Upon returning to the United States Giuntoli joined the burgeoning Chicago theater community as an actor and later as a playwright. After a number of very successful productions Giuntoli moved to Los Angeles where he pursued roles in film and television. In television he is best known for his roles as Brody in Seinfeld, Florus Workman in "The Jeff Foxworthy Show", and the gunfighter Billy Quintaine in the Tales from the Crypt episode "Showdown". He is best known on the big screen for playing the role of Jigger in The Shawshank Redemption, as well as starring in the cult-classic horror film Child's Play. He is also the author and lead actor of the play Hizzoner, a fictional account of former Chicago mayor Richard J. Daley.

== Stage work ==
Giuntoli began working on the stage in Chicago in the early 1980s. Among his early roles were parts in "A Dozen Idiots" at The Performers Arena" and "The Jonah Complex" with David Shepard. Giuntoli went on to co-found The Prop Thtr where he starred in "Answers", "The Chinese Wall" and "Metamorphosis". In 1986, he wrote and starred in his first original play, "Smoke Mountain" with video directed by John McNaughton. He went on to write and star in "Crate Dweller", his critically acclaimed play about a crazy nazi who lives in a crate. Giuntoli's big theatrical break came when he was offered the lead role in "Road" at Chicago's noted Organic Theater Company, which was founded by director, Stuart Gordon. Soon after this he moved to Los Angeles to make movies. In 2006 Giuntoli returned to Chicago to mount his original bio-play, "Hizzoner", which takes place on the last day in the life of Chicago's iconic mayor, Richard J. Daley. The play received the longest run ever to be granted to a production at Chicago's Prop Theater and was a commercial and critical success. It ran through 2009.

== Filmography ==
=== Film appearances ===
- 1988 Child's Play (United Artists) as Eddie Caputo
- 1989 Next of Kin (Warner Bros.) as "Shorty"
- 1990 Memphis Belle (Warner Bros.) as Sergeant Jack Bocci
- 1991 The Borrower (Cannon) as Scully
- 1992 CrissCross (also known as Alone Together, Metro-Goldwyn-Mayer) as Snyder
- 1992 Leather Jackets as Sammy
- 1994 The Shawshank Redemption (Castle Rock) as Jigger
- 1995 Waterworld (Universal) as Hellfire Gunner
- 1996 Up Close & Personal (Touchstone) as Trailer Park Manager
- 1996 Henry: Portrait of a Serial Killer, Part II (Maljack Productions) as Henry
- 1999 The Wetonkawa Flash
- 1999 Palmer's Pick Up (Winchester Films) as Mac

=== Television appearances ===
- 1989 The Revenge of Al Capone (TV Movie, also known as Capone, NBC) as Dutch Schultz (as Neil Gray Giuntoli)
- 1990 Wiseguy (a recurring role, CBS) as Donny
- 1990 A Killer among Us (TV Movie, NBC) as Sam Scoggins
- 1992 Tales from the Crypt (season 4 / Episode 8 / Showdown) as Billy Quintaine
- 1996 Seinfeld (The Little Kicks, NBC) as Brody
- 1996-1997 The Jeff Foxworthy Show (also known as Somewhere in America, NBC) as Florus Workman
