= Mad Dog and Glory =

1993 film by John McNaughton

- Theatrical release poster
- Directed by: John McNaughton
- Written by: Richard Price
- Produced by: Steven A. Jones; Barbara De Fina; Martin Scorsese
- Starring: Robert De Niro; Uma Thurman; Bill Murray; Kathy Baker; David Caruso
- Cinematography: Robby Müller
- Edited by: Elena Maganini; Craig McKay
- Music by: Elmer Bernstein
- Distributed by: Universal Pictures
- Release date: March 5, 1993
- Running time: 97 minutes
- Country: United States
- Language: English
- Budget: $19 million
- Box office: $23.7 million

Mad Dog and Glory is a 1993 American crime drama film directed by John McNaughton, and starring Robert De Niro, Uma Thurman, Bill Murray and David Caruso. The film was released by Universal Pictures on March 5, 1993, receiving positive reviews from critics and grossing $23.7 million against a $19 million budget.

== Plot ==
Wayne Dobie is a shy Chicago Police Department crime scene photographer who has spent years on the job without drawing his gun; his colleagues jokingly call him "Mad Dog". Wayne saves the life of mob boss Frank Milo during a hold-up in a convenience store. To show his appreciation, Milo invites Wayne to a party. During the party at Milo's comedy club, Wayne's hand is burnt by Glory the bartender, who spills hot coffee on him. Milo offers Wayne a gift in return: for one week, he will have the "personal services" of Glory.

Wayne learns that Glory is trying to pay a personal debt and wants nothing to do with Milo after the debt is paid. After an awkward start, Wayne and Glory fall in love. Wayne wants Glory to live with him, but Milo has no intention of letting her go, claiming his lien on her. When Wayne does not comply, Milo sends one of his thugs, Harold, to take Glory away by force. Wayne's partner Mike is waiting and beats Harold in a fight. Milo tells Wayne that he has to pay $40,000 for Glory to have her freedom.

Glory rejects Wayne's attempts to buy her freedom because she feels that it represents her acceptance of being owned. As she walks down the street, Milo shows up. Wayne does his best to get the money, but is $12,500 short. Harold and Mike arrive on the scene but do not interfere as Wayne stands up to Milo. Wayne impulsively draws his gun, challenging Milo to a fight to settle the debt. He and Milo brawl in the street. Glory returns and intervenes but, worrying that Milo may kill Wayne, she offers to leave with Milo. Seeing that Wayne and Glory are in love, Milo makes peace with Wayne and lets Glory go with no strings attached.

== Cast ==
- Robert De Niro as Wayne "Mad Dog" Dobie
- Uma Thurman as Glory
- Bill Murray as Frank Milo
- David Caruso as Mike
- Mike Starr as Harold
- Tom Towles as Andrew the Beater
- Kathy Baker as Lee
- Derek Anunciation as Shooter

Other minor appearances include J. J. Johnston as Shanlon, Jack Wallace as Tommy, Richard Belzer as M.C. / Comic, and the film's screenwriter Richard Price as the Detective in Restaurant.

== Production ==
According to a profile of producer Steven A. Jones written by Luke Ford, the film was delayed by a year because of required changes at the studio. Jones and director John McNaughton were contractually required to deliver the film with no changes to the script written by Richard Price. Universal test-screened the film, then insisted on reshooting the film's final scene. As written, when Milo and Wayne fight, Milo dominates Wayne. Wayne's one connecting punch did no damage, but served to prompt Milo to realize that Glory was not worth so much fighting.

It was re-shot to respond to an audience typecasting of Robert De Niro, whom they saw as the Raging Bull that he had played more than a decade earlier. Those who saw the test screenings could not accept the fact that De Niro's Wayne had done so poorly against Bill Murray's Milo.

Other re-shoots for the film were done to make Glory seem less manipulative and Milo more of a puppet-master behind Glory's actions.

== Reception ==
Review aggregation website Rotten Tomatoes reported 79% of 33 critics gave the film a positive review, with an average rating of 6.3/10. The site's critics consensus states: "Inspired casting and a prevailing sweetness make Mad Dog and Glory an oddball treat." At Metacritic, the film has a weighted average score of 71 out of 100, based on 19 critics, indicating "generally favorable" reviews. Audiences surveyed by CinemaScore gave the film an average grade of C+ on a scale of A+ to F.

Roger Ebert, writing for the Chicago Sun-Times, gave the film 3½ stars out of 4, saying, "The movie is very funny, but it's not broad humor, it's humor born of personality quirks and the style of the performances." He added that the film is "the kind of movie I like to see more than once. The people who made it must have come to know the characters very well, because although they seem to fit into broad outlines, they are real individuals—quirky, bothered, worried, bemused."

Vincent Canby of The New York Times also gave the film a positive review, calling it "a first-rate star vehicle for the big, explosive talents of Mr. De Niro, Mr. Murray and Richard Price, who wrote the screenplay". Expounding on the performances, Canby wrote, "The great satisfaction of Mad Dog and Glory is watching Mr. De Niro and Mr. Murray play against type with such invigorating ease."

Todd McCarthy of Variety called the film a "pleasurably offbeat picture that manages the rare trick of being both charming and edgy".

The film grossed $10.7 million in the United States and Canada, and $13 million internationally, for a worldwide total of $23.7 million.
