= Normal Life =

- Theatrical release poster
- Directed by: John McNaughton
- Written by: Peg Haller; Bob Schneider
- Produced by: Richard Maynard; John Saviano
- Starring: Luke Perry; Ashley Judd
- Cinematography: Jean de Segonzac
- Edited by: Elena Maganini
- Music by: Robert McNaughton; Ken Hale
- Production company: Spelling Films
- Distributed by: Fine Line Features
- Release date: October 25, 1996
- Running time: 101 minutes
- Country: United States
- Language: English
- Box office: $22,891

Normal Life is a 1996 American crime drama film based on the real lives of husband-and-wife bank robbers, Jeffrey and Jill Erickson. The film stars Ashley Judd and Luke Perry and was directed by John McNaughton. The original screenplay was written by husband-and-wife team Peg Haller and Bob Schneider.

== Plot ==
Chris (Luke Perry), a young police officer meets the attractive and sexy Pamela (Ashley Judd) and immediately falls in love with her. Even her drug and alcohol problems cannot affect his mad love for her and they decide to marry. As the relationship continues, more problems arise. Their passionate love is accompanied by destructive fights and Pam's emotional problems start to surface. She shows no respect for Chris's family members who are very important to him. Pam's also manipulative and exploits Chris's love for her, leaving him to do all the chores and making him buy her expensive things until they are on the brink of bankruptcy.

Trouble escalates when Chris loses his job after trouble with a fellow officer. To finance Pam's lifestyle, Chris decides to earn a living by robbing banks. Pam's fascinated with his bank heists and begs him to tag along. After having finally robbed enough banks to afford a house of their own, Chris decides to stop a life of crime, much to Pam's chagrin. Pam soon leaves Chris who quickly finds himself unable to live without her. Chris then agrees to start robbing banks again, which proves to be fatal for the duo.

== Cast ==
- Ashley Judd as Pam Anderson
- Luke Perry as Chris Anderson
- Bruce A. Young as Agent Parker
- Jim True-Frost as Mike Anderson
- Penelope Milford as Adele Anderson
- Edmund Wyson as Darren
- Kate Walsh as Cindy Anderson
- Tom Towles as Frank Anderson

== Production ==
Producer Steven A. Jones read an article about Jeffrey Erickson, a suspected bank robber whose wife Jill led the Federal Bureau of Investigation on a chase through 12 different suburbs, with a machine gun hanging out of the window of her van, when they came to capture him. She died after a gunfight with the authorities, ostensibly taking her own life after she was wounded. He read another article related to the case in The New York Times, and, knowing the author of the articles, tried unsuccessfully to contact him. The rights to the story had already been purchased by someone else, but coincidentally Jones received a screenplay about the couple from the husband-and-wife screenwriting team of Peg Haller and Bob Schneider and producer Richard Maynard, and they agreed to work together.

The William Morris talent agency said Luke Perry was interested in the lead role, and they also suggested Ashley Judd for the female lead. Perry was well known for the television series Beverly Hills, 90210 and Spelling Entertainment were willing to put up the money to make the film.

The distributor New Line Cinema were optimistic about the film at first. However, test audiences were not expecting a crime drama, instead they expected a Luke Perry movie to be similar to 90210 and reacted negatively. New Line declined to release the film. After director John McNaughton complained in the press, they gave the film a limited release for a week in New York and Los Angeles, and then the film went to HBO.

Director John McNaughton explained in a 2017 interview that he intended the film to reflect the economic struggles of the middle class:

"It was a true story and I had followed it because it was so sad. But it was also played for laughs in Chicago. They called him the bearded bandit, because he would wear this fake beard and a Chicago Cubs hat, and he would rob these small banks and get a few thousand dollars. And the TV would go: The bearded bandit struck again today, ha ha ha. But I thought the story was prophetic for what was to come for the American middle class. They just ran out of options and the situation became bleak and hopeless."

In the same interview McNaughton explained that many of the locations used in the film were the actual locations where the events took place in real life, including a bank that Jeffrey Erickson robbed; McNaughton said: "The parking lot where Pam got shot is where we filmed the scene."

== Reception ==
On Rotten Tomatoes the film has an approval rating of 73% based on 11 reviews.

For ReelViews, James Berardinelli wrote "Luke Perry, giving the most convincing performance of his career to date, makes it clear how desperately, hopelessly smitten Chris is by his wild, troubled wife [...] By depicting the sham of 'normality,' Normal Life reminds us how fictitious and unattainable the 'American dream' can be." Roger Ebert, who gave the film 3.5 out of 4, called the film "fascinating in its portrait of criminal pathology" and praised the casting. Peter Sobczynski wrote that Judd gave "her single greatest performance - indeed, one of the strongest bits of film acting that you are ever likely to see - was in what probably remains the most obscure and least-seen film of her career, John McNaughton's 1996 masterpiece Normal Life."

== Home media ==
The film was released on DVD in February 2005.
