= Jeffrey and Jill Erickson =

American couple notorious for bank robbery

Jeffrey E. Erickson (1958–1992) and Jill Sandra Erickson (née Cohen; 1964–1991) were an American married criminal couple from Illinois known for committing a series of violent bank robberies.

The Ericksons are believed to have committed eight bank robberies in the Chicago metropolitan area in 1990 and 1991. Their modus operandi was for Jeffrey to announce a hold-up while wearing a fake beard and carrying a police scanner, while Jill prepared the getaway cars. She killed herself after a high-speed chase, while Jeffrey was killed after attempting to escape the custody of two United States marshals. He had already shot and killed one marshal before being mortally wounded by a police detective.

The 1996 film Normal Life was based upon the Ericksons' exploits.

== Early life ==
Jeffrey was born on December 11, 1958, to Jack Erickson, a telephone company middle manager, and June, a stay-at-home mother. He was raised in Morton Grove, a suburb of Chicago, Illinois, together with his older brother, Jim. In 1977, after graduating from Niles West High School, where he was a member of the swim team, Jeffrey joined the United States Marine Corps, where he acquired excellent marksmanship skills.

Jill was born on January 30, 1964, as the younger of two girls raised by adoptive parents Carl Cohen, a pharmacist, and Fran Cohen, a child education specialist, in Niles, Illinois.

Jeffrey met Jill in a bar near her home on the day she turned 17. He nicknamed her "Gorgeous" due to her long blond hair. Jeffrey later stated that "Jill and I were crazy about each other". After dating for six months, they moved in together, partly as a result of the strain Jill was feeling due to her parents' impending divorce. Jeffrey and Jill were married in a civil ceremony on July 29, 1983.

== Married life and criminal career ==
Jeffrey found work as a truck driver and chauffeur, while Jill, who worked as a lab technician, was a chemistry student at Loyola University Chicago, where she was working toward her degree. The couple never settled down, moving once a year due to complaints from landlords about the dogs and birds they kept. In 1986, Jeffrey became a police officer in Hoffman Estates. He was eventually dismissed, with police chief Donald Cundiff stating that Jeffrey "lacked common sense". His mother stated that Jeffrey disliked arresting people, as he felt he would be ruining someone's day.

On January 9, 1990, Jeffrey robbed his first bank, the First Nationwide Bank branch in Wilmette. His modus operandi— brazenly entering the bank wearing a fake dark beard, baseball cap, sunglasses, and driving gloves, while carrying a police scanner and announcing a hold-up—would be repeated with the same military precision in most of the pair's subsequent robberies over the next two years. The disguise would later prompt bank employees to refer to Jeffrey as the "bearded bank robber" or "Bearded Bandit". He wore clothing in layers in order to disguise his weight. Jill's role is believed to have been setting up the getaway cars.

On November 4, 1991, Palatine police officer Kevin Maher was following a Japanese-made car and noted it had an expired registration sticker. When Maher initiated a traffic stop, the driver of the car, wearing a fake beard and sunglasses, suddenly slammed on the brakes, jumped out, and opened fire on Maher with a .223 assault rifle. Maher, still in his squad car, reversed from the scene and was shot in the shoulder. Rookie police dispatcher James Dunning, who was riding along with Maher, was uninjured. Federal agents created a special task force in the wake of this shooting. On November 18, a man wearing a fake beard robbed a First Chicago Bank branch in Elk Grove Village.

== Townhouse, book store, and Jill's deterioration ==
In February 1991, the couple bought an $86,000 townhouse on Waterford Drive in Hanover Park, paying $22,600 in cash as a down payment. Jeffrey told the real estate agent that he was self-employed, and that for him money was no problem. The couple, who were considered loners, were nocturnal, setting out nightly at 3 a.m. on their loud Honda motorcycles. In May, Jeffrey opened a used book store in Roselle, Best Used Books. Customers were impressed with the excellent condition of the books and Jeffrey's knowledge of the classics.

By wintertime, Jeffrey stated that Jill entered a hospital with an alcoholism problem, and was diagnosed with manic depression. Jeffrey's brother, Jim Erickson, stated that doctors found she was suffering from schizophrenia and had been prescribed Prozac (aka Fluoxetine).

== Death of Jill Erickson ==
On December 10, authorities noticed a Mazda automobile, with its ignition wires exposed, at the edge of a parking lot. Noting that no robberies had occurred nearby, they decided to stake out the car. Six days later, just before noon, Jeffrey and Jill arrived at the parking lot in a grey van. It was believed that they had set out to rob their ninth bank. Jeffrey got out and entered the stolen car, and the officers promptly surrounded it. Authorities stated that Jeffrey was carrying two guns, a fake beard, and two false mustaches. Jeffrey, startled, twice tried to reach for his gun, which lay beside him on the seat, but was warned off. Meanwhile, police approached Jill in the van and she immediately sped off, with police in hot pursuit. The chase continued at high speeds for 11 miles (18 km) through Schaumburg, at times reaching 110 miles per hour (180 km/h), until Jill made a turn at 12:15 p.m. onto Bear Flag Drive, the entranceway to a contained residential development in Hanover Park. Finding herself cornered, she fired a hail of bullets at the officers, who fired back, striking her. She was found slumped on the seat with blood streaming from her head, and was pronounced dead at Humana Hospital in Hoffman Estates at around 6 p.m. The coroner stated that, while Jill was hit by police bullets, her death was caused by a self-inflicted gunshot wound.

Jeffrey was arrested in connection with at least eight bank robberies that netted $180,000. A search of the townhouse revealed 38 guns of different types and 25 boxes of ammunition, along with smoke grenades, gas masks, burglary tools, a police radio scanner, and $1,742 in cash. The garage featured an enormous safe, and a bulletproof vest had arrived at their mail drop.

== Death of Jeffrey Erickson ==
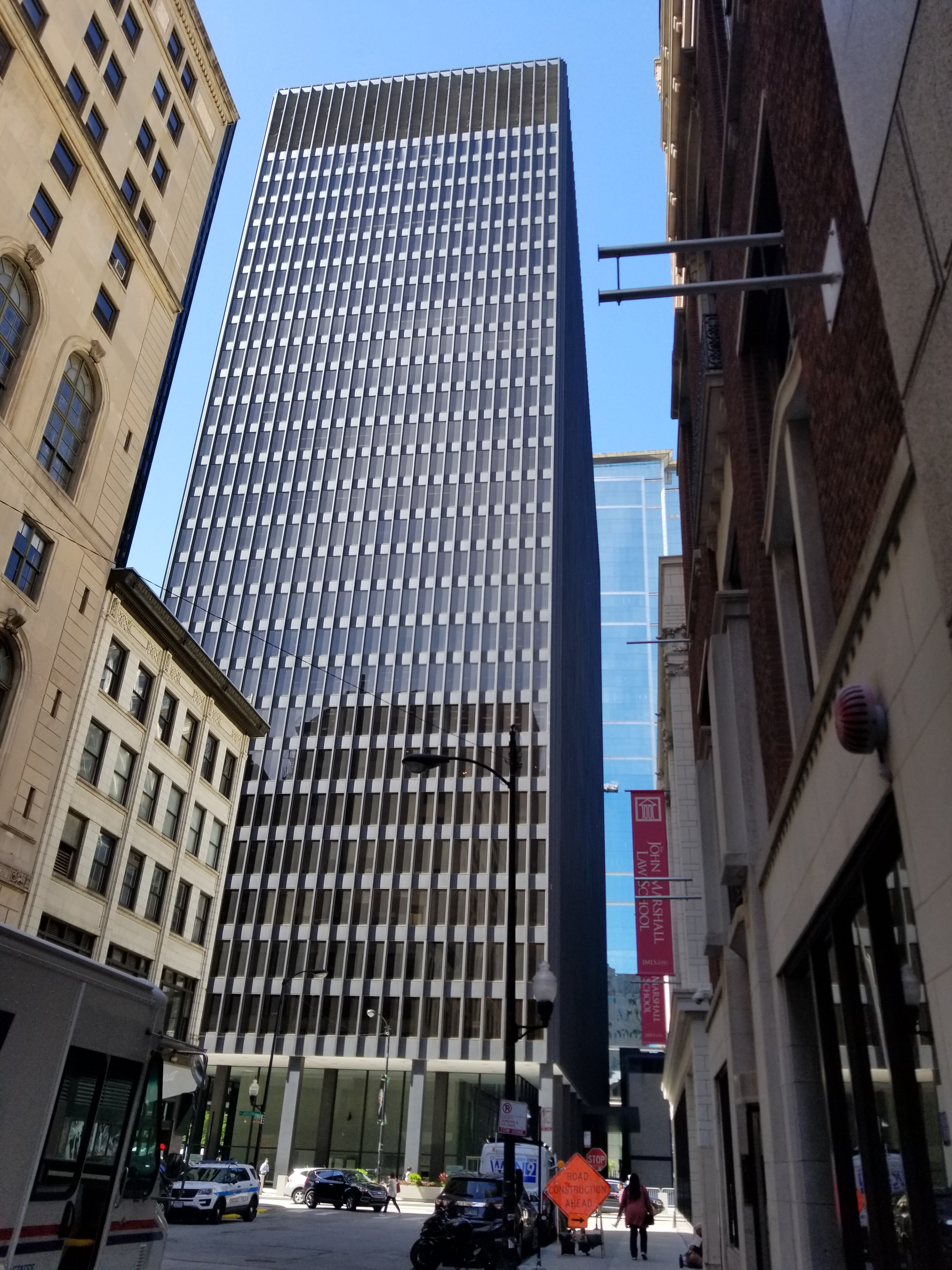
Dirksen Federal Building

On February 12, 1992, Jeffrey Erickson was indicted on federal charges connected to eight bank robberies, and state charges in regards to the shooting of Officer Maher, to which he pleaded not guilty. On July 13, his trial began in the United States district court. Three days later, while Officer Maher testified that he could not positively identify Erickson as the shooter, federal prosecutors demonstrated that shell casings found at the scene matched a gun found in the Ericksons' townhouse.

On July 20 shortly before 5:30 p.m., Erickson was being escorted from the courtroom in the Dirksen Federal Building to the Metropolitan Correctional Center by way of a basement area. Using a stolen handcuff key, he managed to free one of his shackled hands, disarmed a deputy United States marshal to obtain her service revolver, then fatally shot her partner, Roy "Bill" Frakes, twice in the back of the head. Erickson, who was wearing a suit and tie for his trial, intended to run away and disappear among the rush-hour commuting crowd. However, a shootout then ensued, with Erickson shooting Chicago Police Department veteran detective and Special Deputy Marshal Harry Belluomini once in the chest. However, while lying on the ground dying, Belluomini shot Erickson four times in the back with his own .38 Special service revolver before Belluomini succumbed to his injuries. By then, being possibly fatally wounded himself, Erickson ventured halfway up a ramp leading to the street, dropped to one knee, and shot himself in the head, dying almost instantly.

== Legacy ==
The 1996 American crime drama film Normal Life drew inspiration from the Ericksons. Luke Perry played Chris, a rookie policeman who falls in love with the beautiful yet volatile Pam, played by Ashley Judd. The couple soon find themselves embarking on a life of crime characterized by bank robbery, which leads to their eventual self-destruction. The Ericksons are also the subject of the 1997 television film, In the Line of Duty: Blaze of Glory, starring Bruce Campbell and Lori Loughlin, along with an episode of The FBI Files, titled "Death Pact" (Season 5, Episode 14).

== See also ==
- List of homicides in Illinois
