= Henry: Portrait of a Serial Killer =

1986 American horror film by John McNaughton

- Film poster
- Directed by: John McNaughton
- Written by: Richard Fire; John McNaughton
- Produced by: Lisa Dedmond; Steven A. Jones; John McNaughton
- Starring: Michael Rooker; Tom Towles; Tracy Arnold
- Cinematography: Charlie Lieberman
- Edited by: Elena Maganini
- Music by: Ken Hale; Steven A. Jones; Robert McNaughton
- Production company: Maljack Productions
- Distributed by: Greycat Films
- Release dates: September 24, 1986 (Chicago International Film Festival); January 5, 1990 (U.S.)
- Running time: 83 minutes
- Country: United States
- Language: English
- Budget: $110,000
- Box office: $609,939 (US)

Henry: Portrait of a Serial Killer is a 1986 American independent psychological horror film directed and co-written by John McNaughton about the random crime spree of a serial killer who seemingly operates with impunity. It stars Michael Rooker in his film debut as the nomadic killer Henry, Tom Towles as Otis, a prison buddy with whom Henry is living, and Tracy Arnold as Becky, Otis's sister. The characters of Henry and Otis are loosely based on convicted real life serial killers Henry Lee Lucas and Ottis Toole.

The film was shot in 1985 but had difficulty finding a film distributor. It premiered at the Chicago International Film Festival in 1986 and played at other festivals throughout the late 1980s. Following successful showings during which it attracted both controversy and positive critical attention, the film was rated "X" by the MPAA, further increasing its reputation for controversy. It was subsequently picked up for a limited release in 1990 in an unrated version. It was shot on 16mm in less than a month with a budget of $110,000.

The original poster artwork was a painting by Joe Coleman. It was considered too extreme and, after being withdrawn, was replaced by the current official poster.

== Plot ==
Henry is a psychopathic drifter who indiscriminately murders scores of people – men, women, and children – as he travels throughout America. He migrates to Chicago, where he stops at a diner, eats dinner, and later murders several women and the elderly proprietors of a liquor store.

Otis, Henry's prison friend, picks up his sister Becky at Midway International Airport and brings her back to the apartment that he shares with Henry. Later that night, Becky asks Henry about the murder of his mother, the crime that landed him in prison. Henry tells her that he stabbed his mother (which contradicts his other statements, in which he claims to have shot her or killed her with a bat) because she abused and humiliated him as a child, often having sex in front of him. Becky reveals that her father raped her when she was a child. Henry forms a seemingly protective bond with Becky when Otis makes an incestuous pass at her, and Henry violently threatens him. Becky indicates a romantic interest in Henry, but he seems uneasy at her overtures.

The next day, Becky gets a job at a salon. Henry and Otis go out that night and pick up two prostitutes whom Henry murders by breaking their necks. Otis is disturbed and confronts Henry about his murderous lifestyle. Henry invites him to adopt his philosophy of murder, trying to convince him of a relativistic nature of killing.

After Otis destroys his old TV out of frustration, Henry takes him to a fence to buy a new one. The man ridicules them for having little money and berates them for refusing to buy his black-market goods. Henry stabs the fence repeatedly with a soldering iron. When the man fights back, Otis grabs an electrical cord and chokes him. Henry then smashes a TV onto his head. At Henry's urging, Otis plugs in the damaged TV, electrocuting the man. They then steal a high-end TV and a camcorder and return home undetected.

When Otis is punched by a teenage boy whom he tries to sexually assault while selling him marijuana, he complains to Henry that he wants to murder the boy. Henry convinces Otis to abandon the grudge for fear of being caught if he were to harm the boy, since he has been seen near the boy before. Bolstered by the thrill of their previous homicide, the two embark on a killing spree. They set a trap for drivers on Lower Wacker Drive, faking a broken-down car, then fatally shooting a man who pulls over to help. Henry advises Otis to employ a different modus operandi for each murder so that the police will not connect them to one perpetrator. He also explains the importance of being on the move; by the time that police realize that they are looking for a serial killer, he can be long gone. Henry says that he will have to leave Chicago soon. Later, they watch a recording of a home invasion in which they murdered a suburban family of three, with Otis beginning to sexually molest the mother's corpse until Henry objected.

Becky quits her job in order to return home to her daughter after hearing that her ex-husband has been jailed for murder. Otis and Henry argue after their camera gets destroyed while Otis is filming female pedestrians from the window of Henry's moving car. Otis goes for a drink while Henry returns to the apartment. Becky tells Henry her plans, and they go out for a steak dinner. Afterward, she tries to seduce him, but they are interrupted by Otis. Henry leaves to buy cigarettes and get some air. On his way back, he encounters a woman walking her dog and is tempted to murder her but abandons the idea. When he returns to the apartment, he finds Otis raping and strangling Becky. Henry fights Otis, who gets the upper hand. As Otis prepares to kill Henry, Becky stabs him in the eye with her comb. Henry grabs the comb and murders Otis with it, then dismembers the body in the bathtub.

Henry and Becky dump trash bags containing Otis's body parts into the river and leave town. Henry suggests that they go to his sister's ranch in San Bernardino, California, promising Becky that they will send for her daughter when they arrive. In the car, Becky confesses that she loves Henry. "I guess I love you too," Henry replies. They book a motel room for the night. The next morning, Henry leaves the motel, gets into the car, and drives away without Becky. He stops to dump her blood-stained suitcase in a ditch, implying that her remains are inside, then drives away.

== Cast ==
- Michael Rooker as Henry
- Tom Towles as Otis
- Tracy Arnold as Becky
- David Katz as Henry's Boss
- Eric Young as Parole Officer
- Kurt Naebig as High School Jock
- Ray Atherton as The Fence
- Erzsebet Sziky as The Hitchhiker
- Denise Sullivan as Floating Woman
- Monica Anne O'Malley as Mall Victim
- Rick Paul as Shooting Victim
- Ted Kaden as Husband, Dead Couple
- Elizabeth Kaden as Wife, Dead Couple
- Brian Graham as Husband, Murdered Family
- Lisa Temple as Wife, Murdered Family
- Sean Ores as Son, Murdered Family
- Mary Demas as Hooker #1
- Kristin Finger as Hooker #2
- Augie the Dog as Delores the Dog

== Production ==
=== Development and filming ===
In 1984, executive producers Malik B. Ali and Waleed B. Ali of Maljack Productions (MPI) hired John McNaughton, a former delivery man for their video-equipment-rental business, to direct a documentary about gangsters in Chicago during the 1930s. Dealers in Death was a moderate success, and was well received critically, so the Ali brothers kept McNaughton on as director for a second documentary about the Chicago wrestling scene in the 1950s. A collection of vintage wrestling tapes had been discovered, and the owner was willing to sell them to the Ali brothers for use in the documentary. However, after financing was in place, the owner doubled his price and the brothers pulled out of the deal. With the documentary canceled, Waleed and McNaughton decided that the money for the documentary could instead be used to finance a feature film. The Ali brothers gave McNaughton $110,000 to make a bloody horror film.

McNaughton knew that the budget would be too small for a horror film about aliens or monsters and was unsure how to proceed until he saw an episode of 20/20 about the serial killer Henry Lee Lucas. McNaughton decided to film a fictional version of Lucas's crimes.

In the meantime, the Ali brothers brought Steven A. Jones into the project as a producer, and Jones hired Richard Fire to work as McNaughton's co-writer. With the producer, writer and director in place and with the subject matter decided, the film went into production.

Henry: Portrait of a Serial Killer was shot on 16mm in only 28 days in 1985. The film cost $110,000 to produce, and costs were cut by employing family and friends whenever possible and having those on screen use their own possessions. For example, the dead couple in the bar at the start of the film are the parents of director John McNaughton's best friend, while the bar itself is where McNaughton had once worked. McNaughton's close friend Mary Demas plays three different murder victims: the woman in the ditch in the opening shot, the woman with the bottle in her mouth in the toilet and the first of the two murdered prostitutes. The four women whom Henry encounters outside the shopping mall were more of McNaughton's close friends. The woman hitchhiking was a woman whom McNaughton used to work with. The clothes that Michael Rooker wears throughout the film were his own (apart from the shoes and socks). The 1970 Chevrolet Impala that Henry drives belonged to one of the film's electricians. Art director Rick Paul plays the man shot in the layby, storyboard artist Frank Coronado plays the smaller of the attacking bums, grip Brian Graham plays the husband in the family-massacre scene and executive producer Waleed B. Ali plays the clerk serving Henry toward the end of the film.

Rooker remained in character for the duration of filming, even off set, not socializing with any of the cast or crew during the month-long shoot. According to costume designer Patricia Hart, she would not know from one minute to the next if she was talking to Rooker or to Henry, as he would sometimes speak about his childhood and background as if he were Henry. When Rooker's wife discovered that she was pregnant, she waited until filming had stopped before she told him.

Because the production had so little money, the producers could not afford extras, so all of the people in the exterior shots of the streets of Chicago are simply unknowing pedestrians going about their business. For example, in the scene in which Becky emerges from the subway, two men at the top of the stairs are in a heated discussion; the men were really arguing and refused to move, so McNaughton included them in the shot.

After filming was finished, there was so little money left that the film had to be edited on a rented 16 mm flatbed that was set up in editor Elena Maganini's living room.

== Release ==
MPI did not plan a theatrical release for Henry: Portrait of a Serial Killer. McNaughton sent copies of the film to prominent film critics, hoping to attract attention and thus a distributor. Vestron was the first distributor to show an interest, but it pulled out over home-video distribution disputes with MPI and fears of a potential lawsuit because of the film's use of real names. The film premiered at the Chicago International Film Festival on September 24, 1986.

In 1988, MPI hired Chuck Parello, who worked to have the film be released in theaters. The film played at several festivals throughout 1988 and 1989, where it attracted increasing amounts of attention, and Roger Ebert wrote positively of it at the Telluride Film Festival in 1989. Atlantic Entertainment Group expressed interest in releasing the film theatrically but mandated that it have an MPAA "R" rating. The MPAA rated the film "X," which was popularly associated with pornographic films at the time. Because of the "X" rating, Atlantic pulled out.

In Ebert's review of the film, he writes that the MPAA told the filmmakers that no possible combination of edits would have qualified their film for an R rating, indicating that the ratings issue did not simply involve graphic violence. He also said that the film was an obvious candidate for the proposed "A" rating for non-pornographic films intended for adults. Ultimately, the film, along with Peter Greenaway's The Cook, the Thief, His Wife & Her Lover and Pedro Almodóvar's Tie Me Up! Tie Me Down!, were the impetus for the creation of an adults-only rating for non-pornographic films, NC-17. Following further controversy over the rating, Greycoat Films picked up the film for distribution after it was screened at the 1989 Boston Film Festival.

The film's theatrical premiere occurred on January 5, 1990 in Boston, where it grossed $50,504 over the weekend. On March 30, it opened at the Angelika Film Center in New York and in Austin, Texas, grossing $17,888 for the weekend. In its theatrical run, the film eventually grossed $609,000, in part because of the continued controversies. McNaughton credited the MPAA's refusal to accept any cuts as his opportunity to release it uncut, as he would have made cuts had the MPAA requested them.

=== Further censorship ===
In the UK, the film has had a long and complex relationship with the BBFC. In 1991, distributor Electric Pictures submitted the film for classification with 38 seconds already removed (the pan across the hotel room and into the bathroom revealing the semi-naked woman on the toilet with a broken bottle stuck in her mouth). Electric Pictures performed this edit without the approval of director John McNaughton, because the company feared that including such an extreme image so early in the film would turn the board against them. The film was classified "18" for theatrical release in April 1991, after 24 seconds was cut from the family massacre scene (primarily involving the shots in which Otis gropes the mother's breasts before and after killing her).

In 1992, Electric Pictures submitted the pre-cut theatrical print of the film to the BBFC for home-video classification, once again without the shot of the dead woman. In January 1993, the BBFC again classified the film "18," but the board also removed four seconds from the scene in which the TV salesman is murdered, meaning that a total of 42 seconds was removed from the home-video release. However, BBFC director James Ferman overruled his own team and demanded that the family-massacre scene be trimmed down to almost nothing, removing 71 seconds of footage. Additionally, Ferman reedited the scene so that the reaction shot of Henry and Otis watching TV now occurred midway through the scene rather than at the end. The total time cut from the film was thus 113 seconds.

In 2001, Universal Studios Home Entertainment submitted the full uncut version of the film for classification for home-video release. The BBFC waived the four seconds cut from the murder of the TV salesman, and 61 of the 71 seconds from the family-massacre scene (it refused to reinstate the 10 seconds of the scene in which Otis molests the mother after she is dead). Additionally, the board partly approved the 38-second shot of the dead woman on the toilet, but demanded that the last 17 seconds of the shot be removed. Based upon this, Universal decided to remove the shot entirely.

In 2003, Optimum Releasing again submitted the full uncut version of the film for classification for a cinema release, and later for a home-video release. In February 2003, the BBFC passed the film completely uncut, and in March 2003 the uncut version of the film was officially released in the UK for the first time.

A parallel censoring of the film happened in New Zealand, where the film was originally banned outright by the Film Censor in 1992. A censored version was subsequently released on home video with cuts to the family-massacre sequence. The film was finally released uncut on DVD in Australia in 2005. In 2010, another DVD release was approved, apparently without cuts in New Zealand for the first time.

== Reception and legacy ==
Critical reception at the film's premiere was mixed, and the resulting debate over the film's themes and morality helped to raise its profile. The film's subsequent theatrical release was able to capitalize on the positive reviews that it had received throughout its controversial festival showings, and its theatrical reception was more positive. Rotten Tomatoes, a review aggregator, reports that 89% of 65 surveyed critics gave the film a positive review, with an average rating is 7.9/10. The site's critics consensus reads: "Henry: Portrait of a Serial Killer is an effective, chilling profile of a killer that is sure to shock and disturb." On Metacritic the film has a weighted average score of 80 out of 100, based on 22 critics, indicating "generally favorable" reviews.

Critics who liked the film tended to focus on the freshness it had brought to the saturated horror genre. Roger Ebert, for example, called Henry "a very good film" and a "low-budget tour de force", and wrote that the film attempts to deal "honestly with its subject matter, instead of trying to sugar-coat violence as most 'slasher' films do." Ebert and fellow critic Gene Siskel gave the film two thumbs up on Siskel & Ebert. Elliott Stein of The Village Voice stated, "the best film of the year... [it] recalls the best work of Cassavetes." Dave Kehr of the Chicago Tribune said it was "one of the ten best films of the year" and that it "combines Fritz Lang's sense of predetermination with the freshness of John Cassavetes." In a review from 1989, Variety wrote the film "marks the arrival of a major film talent" in McNaughton.

The film is listed in the reference book 1001 Movies You Must See Before You Die, which says "Henry evokes horror through gritty realism and excellent acting. The film is not fun to watch, but it is important in that it forces viewers into questioning our cultural fascination with serial killers."

Slant Magazine named Michael Rooker's role one the "15 Famous Movie Psychopaths". The movie has also been called an example of postmodern horror cinema.

=== Accolades ===
It was nominated at the 6th Independent Spirit Awards for Best Feature, Best Director, Best Male Lead (Rooker), Best Supporting Male (Towles) and Best Screenplay.

The film was nominated by the American Film Institute in 2003 for its AFI's 100 Years...100 Heroes & Villains list.

== Comparison to real-life source material ==
In prison, Henry Lee Lucas confessed to over 600 murders, claiming that he committed about one murder per week from his release from prison in 1975 until his arrest in 1983. While the film was inspired by Lucas' confessions, the vast majority of his claims turned out to be false. A detailed investigation by the Texas attorney general's office ruled out Lucas as a suspect in most of his confessions by comparing his known whereabouts to the dates of the murders to which he confessed. Lucas was convicted of 11 murders, but law-enforcement officers and other investigators have overwhelmingly rejected his claims of having killed hundreds of victims. The Texas attorney general's office produced the "Lucas Report", which concluded that reliable physical evidence linked Lucas to three murders.

Others familiar with the case have suggested that Lucas committed between two and 40 murders. Lucas confessed to almost every unsolved murder brought before him, often with the collusion of police officers who wanted to clear their files of unsolved and cold cases. Lucas reported that the false confessions ensured better conditions for him, as law enforcement officers would offer him incentives to confess to crimes that he did not commit. Such confessions also increased his fame with the public. Lucas was ultimately convicted of 11 murders and sentenced to death for the murder of an unidentified female victim known only as "Orange Socks". His death sentence was commuted to life in prison by Texas governor George W. Bush in 1998. Lucas died in prison of heart failure on March 13, 2001.

== Home media ==
In the UK, the film was first released in its uncut form in 2003 by Optimum Releasing. The DVD contains a commentary by director John McNaughton (recorded in 1999), a censorship timeline, comparisons of the scenes edited by the BBFC with their original uncut version, two interviews with McNaughton (one from 1999, one from 2003), a stills gallery and a biography of Henry Lee Lucas (text).

In 2005, a special 20th-anniversary edition two-disc DVD was released by Dark Sky Films in the U.S. The DVD includes a newly recorded commentary from McNaughton, a 50-minute making-of documentary, a 23-minute documentary about Henry Lee Lucas, 21 minutes of deleted scenes with commentary by McNaughton, a stills gallery and prints of the original storyboards. Its reversible cover features the banned original poster art by Joe Coleman. The film was first released on Blu-ray disc in 2009 by MPI Media Group.

== Sequel ==
A sequel, Henry: Portrait of a Serial Killer, Part II, was released in 1996. The film was directed by Chuck Parello and starred Neil Giuntoli as Henry with Kate Walsh and Penelope Milford in supporting roles.

== See also ==
- List of films featuring home invasions
- List of films featuring psychopaths and sociopaths
- Extreme cinema
- List of American independent films

== Sources ==
- Kimber, Shaun (2011). Henry: Portrait of a Serial Killer. Palgrave Macmillan. ISBN 9780230343696.
- Scheider, Steven Jay (2013). 1001 Movies You Must See Before You Die. Murdoch Books Pty Limited. p. 782. ISBN 978-0-7641-6613-6.
- Shellady, Brad (2002). "Henry: Fabrication of a Serial Killer". In Kick, Russ (ed.). Everything You Know Is Wrong: The Disinformation Guide to Secrets and Lies. Disinformation Company. ISBN 978-0971394209.
