= Push, Nevada =

- Genre: Mystery
- Created by: Ben Affleck; Sean Bailey
- Starring: Derek Cecil; Scarlett Chorvat
- Country of origin: United States
- Original language: English
- No. of episodes: 7 (aired)

Production
- Executive producers: Ben Affleck; Sean Bailey; Matt Damon; Chris Moore
- Producers: Dwayne Shattuck; Derek Cecil
- Production companies: LivePlanet; Touchstone Television

Original release
- Network: ABC
- Release: September 17 – October 24, 2002

Push, Nevada is an American mystery television series, set in the fictional town of Push, Nevada. Intended as a 13-episode season, it premiered on September 17, 2002, on ABC, and ran for seven episodes before it became one of the first shows to be canceled during the fall portion of the 2002-03 season.

== Overview ==
Created by Ben Affleck and Sean Bailey, Push, Nevada was unique in that it offered viewers a chance to follow along and solve the mystery of the series for a prize of $1,045,000. Each episode contained clues, from web addresses in the opening credits to specific phrases uttered by characters in the show, each having its own significance to the mystery.

24-year-old New Jersey resident Mark Nakamoto won the grand prize, calling a special number within just two minutes of the last clue being given during an airing of Monday Night Football. The show's cancellation came about two weeks before the final clue was given, but U.S. law required that the contest continue until its conclusion.

== Premise ==
The show follows a mild-mannered IRS agent, Jim Prufrock, as he travels to the mysterious desert town of Push, Nevada. While investigating a sizable accounting error made by the Versailles Casino, he begins to realize that there may be stranger things going on in this town than embezzlement. Despite frequent warnings from a "Slo-dancer", Mary, to leave town before he is in too deep, Jim continues to investigate things that do not seem to add up. After many unpleasant incidents, and with the help of his faithful secretary, Grace, Jim discovers that no one in Push has filed an income tax return since 1985. There is also a clandestine corporation known as Watermark, LLC., that appears to control every financial facet of the town, as well as local law enforcement and even forces in the federal government. With the help of Shadrack, Mary Sloman, Caleb Moore, Job, and other townspeople who seem less crooked, Jim begins to unravel the mystery surrounding the missing million (and Bible), and the strange behavior of Push's residents.

By the final episode, Jim has not learned the contents of the North Wing of Martha's Boarding House, or that his father, Alfred (presumed dead since Jim was a child), sent the mysterious fax that first brought him to Push.

== Episodes ==
| No. | Title | Directed by | Written by | Original release date | U.S. viewers (millions) |
|---|---|---|---|---|---|
| 1 | "The Amount" | John McNaughton | Ben Affleck & Sean Bailey | September 17, 2002 | 12.00 |
| 2 | "The Black Box" | Charles McDougall | Ben Affleck & Sean Bailey | September 19, 2002 | 5.69 |
| 3 | "The Color of..." | Davis Guggenheim | James D. Parriott | September 26, 2002 | 4.45 |
| 4 | "Storybook Hero" | John Patterson | Tom Garrigus | October 3, 2002 | 4.35 |
| 5 | "The Letter of the Law" | Lisa Cholodenko | John Serge | October 10, 2002 | 3.65 |
| 6 | "S.O.S." | Rodman Flender | Joan Rater & Tony Phelan | October 17, 2002 | 3.14 |
| 7 | "Jim's Domain (a.k.a. Denial)" | Nick Gomez | Joan Rater & Tony Phelan | October 24, 2002 | 4.03 |

== Characters ==
=== Main ===
- Jim Prufrock (Derek Cecil): a mild-mannered IRS agent who travels to Push to investigate a fax that was accidentally sent to his office.
- Mary Sloman (Scarlett Chorvat): a "Slo-dancer" at the local bar who seems to have a great interest in Jim's well-being.

=== Supporting ===
- Silas Bodnick (Jon Polito): a rude, little bald man who's been skimming approximately a million dollars from the Versailles Casino each year. He's involved with Watermark LLC, but has no idea how powerful they really are.
- Grace (Melora Walters): Jim's enigmatic secretary at the IRS.
- Martha (Conchata Ferrell): the owner and operator of Martha's Boarding House. She seems to have known Jim's father, Alfred, from her Slo-Dancing days.
- BRB (Tom Towles): a strange truck driver, who picks up Jim in the desert after his car breaks down. BRB is also involved with Watermark.
- Oswald Wilkes (Daniel Sauli): Silas Bodnick's killer (with the serpent tattoo).
- Mr. Smooth (Armand Assante)
- Dwight Sloman (Raymond J. Barry): a crooked businessman, owner of many of Push's establishments (including the Versailles Casino, and the Slo-Dance Bar), and, we find out later, Mary's incestuous father.
- Caleb Moore (Monty Bane): constantly freezing local who helps Bodnick steal the money and Bible from the Versailles safe.
- Job: an "honest mechanic". He tows and fixes Jim's car after it breaks down—for free.
- Ira Glassman: Jim's boss at the IRS. Ira is a yes man, doing what his superiors say, and apparently cannot think for himself. Ira felt comfortable enough with Jim's visit on their first encounter by wrapping up the meeting with "let's grab an Arby's".
- Sheriff Gaines: a moron. His idiocy could be the result of blind obedience to the Watermark boys. Clearly, they control him.
- Dawn (Liz Vassey): at first, apparently a flaky, quirky Sheriff's deputy. Later, we learn she is an agent from the U.S. Treasury, investigating Dwight Sloman.
- Shadrack (W. Earl Brown): an eccentric desert artist. Shadrack was a city official in Push before Watermark took over. He also used to know Jim's father.
- Darlene (Abby Brammell): Jim's soon-to-be ex-wife. She has more addictions than she has money, so between drunken one-night-stands, she calls Jim for more money, which he sends. Later, Watermark does its voodoo on Darlene, and she transforms herself into the perfect little housewife, trying to woo Jim back into her arms (and out of Push).
- Delilah (Alexondra Lee): a former Slo-Dancer, now BRB's wife. She's under Watermark's mind-control, but senses there is something wrong with her behavior.
- The Well Dressed Men (Larry Poindexter, Steven Culp, Tom Gallop): three expensive-suited, Lexus-driving corporate thugs. They are the go-between for Watermark and Dwight Sloman. They also handle Watermark's public relations through persuasive suggestion.
- Michael Sudris (Joel Bissonnette): Job's tattoo-artist friend. He tattoos Jim's back with "Death & Taxes". He couldn't handle Watermark's mind-control attempts when they first began in Push. He flipped out one day, and moved to Demonhead Flats in his trailer/tattoo parlor to smoke peyote and never watch TV again.

== Contest ==
Clues for the final 6 unaired episodes of Push, NV were given to viewers after the airing of the 7th episode

Each of the 13 originally planned episodes was to have a clue word or phrase embedded into it. This word was repeated and hidden several times throughout the episode. For example, the clue for the seventh episode Jim's Domain was "www.toyota18.com", and that web address was seen throughout the episode as the address of the Carson City IRS, spelled out by letters on stacks of books and boxes, and hidden as an acronym of the news headline "Why Would We Drive Or Take Taxis? One Young Orphan Takes An 18 Day Outing To Climb Oracle Mountain".

After the seventh episode aired, the clues for the remaining 6 unaired episodes were shown, and viewers were told that the final clue would be revealed during the October 28, 2002 episode of Monday Night Football.

The complete list of episode clues was:

1. 1,045,000
2. television
3. orange
4. Peter Pan
5. g
6. Morse code
7. www.toyota18.com
8. five
9. longitude
10. underwear
11. southeast
12. Bodnick
13. Eliot

The final clue given during Monday Night Football was "Spaces and punctuation count. Don't count the first episode. Then 5th place, 1st, 9th, 1st, 5th, 7th, 4th, 1st, 2nd, 7th, 5th, and 2nd places in order." By taking the appropriate letters from each episode (5th letter of "television" is V, 1st letter of "orange" is O, etc.), the word VONGEYELNAIL was spelled. Replacing EYE with the letter I (as a sign in the background of the clue instructed) produced the word VONGILNAIL, which translates into the phone number 866-445-6245. The first person to call that phone number won the contest.
