= Penelope Milford =

American actress (1948–2025)

- Milford in Coming Home (1978)
- Born: Penelope Dale Milford; March 23, 1948; St. Louis, Missouri, U.S.
- Died: October 14, 2025 (aged 77); Saugerties, New York, U.S.
- Occupation: Actress
- Years active: 1968–2013
- Family: Kim Milford (brother)

Penelope Dale Milford (March 23, 1948 – October 14, 2025) was an American stage and screen actress. She is best known for her role as Vi Munson in Coming Home (1978) for which she was nominated for an Academy Award for Best Supporting Actress. Milford also originated the role of Jenny Anderson in the Broadway musical Shenandoah, for which she was nominated for a Drama Desk Award in 1975.

== Early life and education ==
Milford was born March 23, 1948, in St. Louis, Missouri, and grew up in Illinois. She was the daughter of Richard George Milford and Ann Marie (nee Felt) Milford. Milford graduated from New Trier High School in Winnetka, Illinois. Her younger brother, Kim, was an actor and musician until his death from heart failure at age 37.

== Marriage ==
Milford was married to poet/actor Michael David Lally from 1982–84.

== Career ==
=== Theatre ===
In 1972, she joined the Broadway cast of the play Lenny, about the life of actor Lenny Bruce. In 1974, she was cast as Jenny Anderson in the musical Shenandoah, based on the 1965 film of the same name. Shenandoah opened on Broadway on January 7, 1975, and was nominated for the Tony Award for Best Musical. For her performance, Milford was nominated for the first Drama Desk Award for Best Featured Actress.

Off-Broadway in 1971, Milford starred as Judith opposite Richard Gere in Long Time Coming and a Long Time Gone, a musical about artist Richard Fariña. Milford appeared in Felix (1974), Fishing (1981) by Michael Weller, and Territorial Rites (1983). She also performed in a revue show titled The Second Hottest Show in Town.

In 2013, Milford played the role of Deborah in the Harold Pinter play A Kind of Alaska at the Cocoon Theatre in Rhinebeck, New York.

=== Television ===
Milford's first television appearance was on a 1976 episode of The Blue Knight. In 1980, Milford starred in Seizure: The Story of Kathy Morris, as Kathy Morris. Also, in 1980, she co-starred in the Emmy Award-winning television movie The Oldest Living Graduate starring Henry Fonda and Cloris Leachman. In 1982, she starred opposite Sondra Locke in the Jackie Cooper-directed, Emmy Award-winning television film Rosie: The Rosemary Clooney Story, where she played Betty Clooney, the sister of Rosemary Clooney. In 1984, Milford appeared in the Golden Globe Award-winning television movie The Burning Bed starring Farrah Fawcett and Paul Le Mat. In 1985 she guest starred on an episode of The Hitchhiker.

=== Film ===
Milford's first film appearance was as an extra on the Norman Mailer film Maidstone (1970). In 1974, she appeared in the movie Man on a Swing. She next played a fictional actress named Lorna Sinclair in Ken Russell's BAFTA-nominated 1977 film Valentino, about the life of actor Rudolph Valentino. In 1978, she was cast as Vi Munson in Coming Home, and she was nominated for an Academy Award for Best Supporting Actress, as well as for a Photoplay Award for Favorite Female Newcomer. In 1980, she appeared in the movie The Last Word. She played a supporting role in Take This Job and Shove It and Endless Love. In 1982, she starred in the horror film Blood Link and then starred in the 1983 adventure film The Golden Seal.

After this time, her film appearances became less frequent, not appearing until the 1988 cult film Heathers. Her last few films include Cold Justice (1989), Miss Missouri (1990), Normal Life (1996), Henry: Portrait of a Serial Killer, Part II (1996), and Night of the Lawyers (1997).

== Death ==
Milford died in Saugerties, New York, on October 14, 2025, at the age of 77.

== Filmography ==
- 1970: Maidstone (uncredited)
- 1974: Man on a Swing as Evelyn Moore
- 1976: The Blue Knight (1 episode)
- 1977: Valentino as Lorna Sinclair
- 1978: Coming Home as Vi Munson
- 1979: The Last Word as Denise Travis
- 1980: Seizure: The Story of Kathy Morris (TV) as Kathy Morris
- 1980: The Oldest Living Graduate (TV) as Martha Ann
- 1981: Take This Job and Shove It as Lenore Meade
- 1981: Endless Love as Ingrid Orchester
- 1982: Rosie: The Rosemary Clooney Story (TV) as Betty Clooney
- 1982: Blood Link as Julie Warren
- 1983: The Golden Seal as Tania Lee
- 1984: The Burning Bed (TV) as Gaby
- 1985: The Hitchhiker as Diane Hampton (1 episode)
- 1989: Heathers as Pauline Fleming
- 1989: Cold Justice as Eileen
- 1990: Miss Missouri as Ann
- 1996: Normal Life as Adele Anderson
- 1996: Henry: Portrait of a Serial Killer, Part II as Woman In Woods, Henry's First Victim
- 1997: Night of the Lawyers as Anna Carroll
