= Tracy Arnold =

American actress

- Born: August 11, 1962 (age 63); Austin, Texas, U.S.
- Occupation: Actress

Tracy Arnold (born August 11, 1962) is an American actress.

Arnold was born in Austin, Texas. She is perhaps best known for her role in Henry: Portrait of a Serial Killer (1986), for which she was nominated for Best Supporting Actress by the Independent Spirit Awards.

Her other films include The Borrower (1991), The Shot (1996) and The Other One (2017). She also had a role in an episode of Baywatch.

== Filmography ==
- 1986 Henry: Portrait of a Serial Killer as Becky
- 1991 The Borrower as Nurse
- 1992 Baywatch as Mom (Reunion)
- 1993 Sex, Love and Cold Hard Cash as Purser
- 1996 The Shot as Sissy Mayron
- 2003 The Prince of Peace as Ann
- 2017 The Other One as Connie
