= Tom Towles =

American actor (1950-2015)

- Born: March 20, 1950; Chicago, Illinois, U.S.
- Died: April 2, 2015 (aged 65); Pinellas, Florida, U.S.
- Occupation: Actor
- Years active: 1971–2008
- Known for: Henry: Portrait of a Serial Killer; Night of the Living Dead; House of 1000 Corpses; Miami Vice; NYPD Blue; Blood in Blood out
- Military career
- Allegiance: United States
- Branch: United States Marine Corps

Tom Towles (March 20, 1950 – April 2, 2015) was an American character actor of film, theatre, and television, known for his portraying villains and intimidating supporting characters. His breakthrough role as Otis in Henry: Portrait of a Serial Killer (1986) earned him an Independent Spirit Award nomination for Best Supporting Male. He appeared in numerous films and television series including Night of the Living Dead (1990), Blood In Blood Out (1993), The Rock (1996), NYPD Blue, Dr. Dolittle (1998), The Devil's Rejects (2005), Miami Vice, and Malcolm in the Middle.

== Early life ==
Towles was born on March 20, 1950 in Chicago, Illinois. He had a sister by the name of Kai. Prior to acting, Towles briefly served in the United States Marine Corps.

== Career ==
In 1971, Towles began his acting career in Chicago where he performed as a member of the Organic Theater Company. He made his film debut portraying a minor role as a cop in Dog Day Afternoon (1975). Afterwards, Towles returned to Chicago to continue performing with the Organic Theater Company, as well as performing at the Goodman Theatre. After a decade-long hiatus, Towles returned to the screen in the film Pink Nights (1985).

Towles made his breakthrough role as Otis in Henry: Portrait of a Serial Killer. His character was based on real-life serial killer Ottis Toole.

Towles also appeared on television in such shows as Seinfeld, NYPD Blue, L.A. Law, ER, Star Trek: Deep Space Nine, Star Trek: Voyager and Firefly.

Towles frequently collaborated with filmmaker Rob Zombie, appearing in House of 1000 Corpses (2003), The Devil's Rejects (2005), Halloween (2007) and Grindhouse (2007).

== Death ==
Towles died on April 2, 2015, at the age of 65, in a hospital in Pinellas, Florida of complications following a stroke.

== Filmography ==
=== Film ===
Year	Title	Role	Notes
1975	Dog Day Afternoon	Cop	Uncredited
1985	Pink Nights	Ralph	
1986	Henry: Portrait of a Serial Killer	Otis	Nominated- Independent Spirit Award for Best Supporting Male
1989	The Borrower	Bob Laney	Nominated- Fangoria Chainsaw Award for Best Supporting Actor
1990	Men Don't Leave	Evan Taylor	
1990	Night of the Living Dead	Harry Cooper	
1991	The Pit and the Pendulum	Don Carlos Molina	
1992	Fortress	Stiggs	
1993	Blood In Blood Out	"Red" Ryder	
1993	Mad Dog and Glory	Andrew, The Beater	
1996	God's Lonely Man	Steven	
1996	Normal Life	Frank Anderson	
1996	The Rock	Alcatraz Park Ranger	
1997	Gridlock'd	Max	
1997	Warriors of Virtue	General Grillo	
1997	Night of the Lawyers	Moriarty	
1998	The Prophecy II	Detective Waltrip	
1998	Dr. Dolittle	German Shepherd	Voice
2000	More Dogs Than Bones	Detective Waltrip	
2002	Groom Lake	Dietz	
2003	House of 1000 Corpses	Deputy George Wydell	
2005	The Devil's Rejects	Deputy George Wydell	
2006	Miami Vice	Coleman	
2007	Grindhouse	Lieutenant Boorman	Segment "Werewolf Women of the SS"
2007	Home Sick	Uncle Johnny	
2007	Halloween	Larry Redgrave	
2008	Blood on the Highway	Louis Debois	Final film role

=== Television ===
Year	Title	Role	Notes
1987	Jack and Mike	Maxie	Episode: "Charity Ball"
1987	High Mountain Rangers	T.J. Cousins	Episode: "Pilot"
1988	Sable	Eddie	Episode: "Mob"
1992	Mann & Machine	Lomax	Episode: "Mann's Fate"
1993	Star Trek: Deep Space Nine	Hon'Tihl	Episode: "Dramatis Personae"
1993	Seinfeld	Tough Guy	Episode: "The Glasses"
1993-1994	NYPD Blue	Inspector Anthony Lastarza	Recurring role; Season 1
1993-1994	Bakersfield P.D.	Riley	2 episodes
1994	L.A. Law	Warden Geoff Ropella	Episode: "Three on a Patch"
1994	Girls in Prison	Norman Stoneface	Television film
1995	VR.5	Shepard	Episode: "Dr. Strangechild"
1996	Pacific Blue	Mr. Baron	Episode: "Rapscallions"
1996	ER	Matthew	Episode: "No Brain, No Gain"
1996	3rd Rock from the Sun	Dale	Episode: "Gobble, Gobble, Dick, Dick"
1996	Night Stand with Dick Dietrick	Mad Cow	Episode: "Uniting Love Ones"
1997	Profiler	Steve Calagian	Episode: "Learning From the Masters"
1997	Star Trek: Voyager	Dr. Vatm	Episode: "Rise"
1998	Mercenary II: Thick & Thin	Colonel Chamaro	Television film
1998	Maximum Bob	Ike Worth	Episode: "Once Bitten..."
1998	The Pretender	Jack Brevins	Episode: "Parole"
1999	Lansky	Nick	Television film
1999	The Drew Carey Show	Detective Streible	Episode: "Drew Tries to Kill Mimi"
2001	18 Wheels of Justice	Ray Palmeri	Episode: "The Interrogation"
2002	Firefly	Lund	Episode: "The Train Job"
2002	Push, Nevada	BRB	Recurring role; Season 1
2002	Robbery Homicide Division	Kevin Molas	Episode: "Wild Ride"
2003	Crossing Jordan	Bill Williamson	Episode: "Wild Card"
2003	CSI: Crime Scene Investigation	Zeke	Episode: "Homebodies"
2003	Malcolm in the Middle	Ethan	Episode: "Christmas Trees"

=== Video games ===
Year	Title	Role	Notes
2002	New Legends	Bradley	Voice
