= John McNaughton =

American film director

- Born: Chicago, Illinois, U.S.
- Occupations: Film director, television director
- Years active: 1970–present
- Style: Horror; thriller; drama; comedy

John McNaughton is an American film and television director, best known for directing the controversial Henry: Portrait of a Serial Killer (1986) and Wild Things (1998). His works encompass a wide array of genres such as horror, thriller, drama and comedy. Other directorial credits include The Borrower (1991), Mad Dog and Glory (1993), and Normal Life (1996).

== Career ==
His first feature film, made in 1986, was Henry: Portrait of a Serial Killer, a film McNaughton directed, co-wrote, and co-produced. Numerous complications plagued the controversial film, delaying its theatrical release until 1989. The film made Time magazine's and Roger Ebert's ten best lists and won best picture honors at Fantasporto, Sitges Film Festival and the Brussels International Festival of Fantasy Film.

His other works include the films Mad Dog and Glory and Wild Things, the documentary Condo Painting as well as episodes of Homicide: Life on the Street, John From Cincinnati, Masters of Horror and the pilot episode for Push, Nevada.

== Personal life ==
McNaughton studied fine arts at the University of Illinois at Urbana-Champaign, and graduated from Columbia College Chicago with a degree in television production and a minor in photography.

== Filmography ==
=== Film ===
Feature film

Year	Title	Director	Producer	Writer
1986	Henry: Portrait of a Serial Killer	Yes	Yes	Yes
1991	The Borrower	Yes	No	No
1991	Sex, Drugs, Rock & Roll	Yes	No	No
1993	Mad Dog and Glory	Yes	No	No
1996	Normal Life	Yes	No	No
1998	Wild Things	Yes	No	No
2001	Speaking of Sex	Yes	Executive	No
2013	The Harvest	Yes	No	No

Documentary film

Year	Title	Director	Producer	Writer
1984	Dealers in Death	Yes	Yes	No
2000	Condo Painting	Yes	No	Yes

=== Television ===
TV movies

Year	Title	Notes
1994	Girls in Prison	
1997	Firehouse	Credited as Alan Smithee
1999	Lansky	
2003	Expert Witness	Unaired pilot

TV series

Year	Title	Notes
1994–1996	Homicide: Life on the Street	5 episodes
2002	Push, Nevada	Episode "The Amount"
2003	Without a Trace	Episode "Maple Street"
2006	Masters of Horror	Episode "Haeckel's Tale"
2007	John from Cincinnati	Episode "His Visit: Day Three"
