= André De Shields =

American entertainer (born 1946)

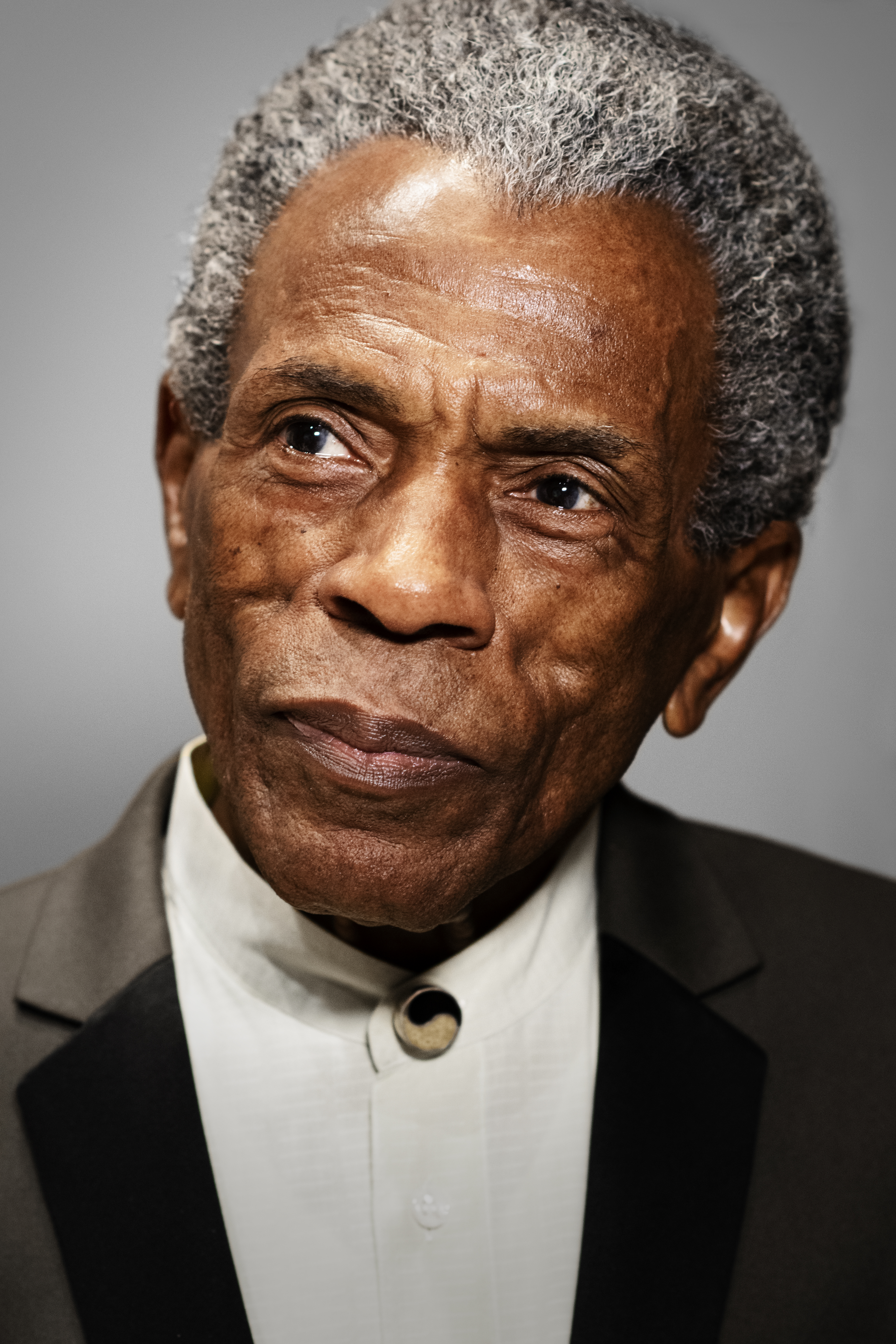
- De Shields in 2022
- Born: January 12, 1946 (age 80); Baltimore, Maryland, U.S.
- Education: Wilmington College (attended); University of Wisconsin, Madison (BA); New York University (MA)
- Occupations: Actor; singer; director; dancer; choreographer
- Years active: 1967–present
- Website: Official website

André Robin De Shields (born January 12, 1946) is an American actor, singer, dancer, director, and choreographer. He has received numerous accolades including a Tony Award, a Grammy Award, and a Primetime Emmy Award. Among his other film and TV appearances, he appeared for two years in the soap opera Another World.

De Shields has appeared in the original Broadway casts of multiple stage productions, including The Full Monty, Warp!, and The Wiz, and most notably originating the role of Hermes on Broadway in the musical Hadestown, winning the 2019 Tony Award for Best Actor in a Featured Role in a Musical and the 2020 Grammy Award for Best Musical Theater Album for his performance. He has also appeared on television, and won a Primetime Emmy Award for Outstanding Individual Achievement for his performance in the 1982 NBC broadcast of Ain't Misbehavin'.

== Early life and education ==
André Robin De Shields was born on January 12, 1946, in Dundalk, Maryland, to Mary Gunther and John De Shields. He was raised in Baltimore, the ninth of eleven children; his father died at the age of 50, when André was 17. De Shields obtained his high school diploma at Baltimore City College in 1964, then attended Wilmington College, where he starred in a production of Lorraine Hansberry's A Raisin in the Sun. He then transferred colleges and earned his BA in English literature from the University of Wisconsin, Madison in 1970. In 1991, De Shields received his MA in African-American studies from the Gallatin School of Individualized Study of New York University.

He is an adjunct professor at Gallatin. De Shields also received an honorary doctorate from Boston Conservatory in 2020.

== Career ==
=== 1969–1979: Hair and career beginnings ===
De Shields began his professional career in the 1969 Chicago production of Hair, which led to a role in The Me Nobody Knows and participation in Chicago's Organic Theater Company. He has performed in a number of Off-Off-Broadway productions at La MaMa Experimental Theatre Club in the East Village of Manhattan, including Ken Rubenstein's Sacred Guard (1973) and Lamar Alford's Thoughts (1974).

He made his Broadway debut as Xander in Stuart Gordon's 1973 Warp! and next appeared in Paul Jabara's 1973 Rachael Lily Rosenbloom (And Don't You Ever Forget It), which closed during previews. He then appeared in the title role of The Wiz, Charlie Smalls and William F. Brown's 1975 musical directed by Geoffrey Holder.

After choreographing two Bette Midler musicals, De Shields returned to Broadway to perform in the musical revue Ain't Misbehavin' in 1978. The original production ran for over 1,600 shows and De Shields earned a 1978 Drama Desk Award nomination for his performance. Three years later, he returned to Broadway to perform in Stardust: The Mitchell Parrish Musical, a musical revue featuring the lyricist's work with Hoagy Carmichael, Benny Goodman, Duke Ellington, and Leroy Anderson.

=== 1980–2018: Career fluctuations ===
De Shields won a Primetime Emmy Award for Outstanding Individual Achievement for his performance in the 1982 NBC broadcast of Ain't Misbehavin', and played Tweedledum in a 1983 televised production of Alice in Wonderland that also featured Eve Arden, Richard Burton, Colleen Dewhurst, James Coco, Kaye Ballard, and Nathan Lane.

He wrote, choreographed, directed, and starred in André De Shields' Haarlem Nocturne, a 1984 Broadway musical revue featuring standards from the American songbook, pop hits from the early 1960s, and De Shields' own songs. The revue was produced at the Latin Quarter and at La MaMa (with music by Marc Shaiman). He co-wrote (with Judith Cohen) and directed an evening of songs called Judith and the Cohen Sisters in Midnight in Manhattan at La MaMa in September/October 1984. De Shields appeared in the Cotton Club Gala at La MaMa in 1985, with music by Aaron Bell and directed by Ellen Stewart. He directed a production of Chico Kasinoir's The Adventures of Rhubarb: The Rock and Roll Rabbit in 1985. He appeared in a revival of Ain't Misbehavin' in 1988. He directed a production of his own work, Saint Tous, to celebrate Black History Month at La MaMa in February 1991. De Shields next appeared on Broadway in 1997 as the Jester in Play On!, a musical based on Ellington's songs, earning Tony and Drama Desk nominations for his performance. He appeared on television on Another World, Cosby, Sex and the City, Great Performances, Lipstick Jungle, Law & Order, and Law & Order: Special Victims Unit.

De Shields originated the role of Noah "Horse" T. Simmons in the Terrence McNally / David Yazbek musical adaptation of the film The Full Monty in 2000. De Shields again earned both Tony and Drama Desk nominations for his performance. He appeared in the short-lived Broadway production of the Mark Medoff play Prymate, which had five performances at the Longacre Theatre in 2004. He received a 2008 Drama Desk Award nomination for his performance in an off-Broadway production of Langston Hughes' Black Nativity. From March through May 2009, he appeared opposite Joan Allen and Jeremy Irons in the Broadway play Impressionism at the Gerald Schoenfeld Theater.

De Shields' other regional theatre credits include Waiting for Godot, The Man Who Came to Dinner, Death of a Salesman, Dusyanta: A Tale of Kalidasa, The Gospel According to James, Camino Real and King Lear. He portrayed Akela and King Louie in the 2013 world premiere of Mary Zimmerman's adaptation of Rudyard Kipling's The Jungle Book, a co-production of the Goodman Theatre and Huntington Theatre Company. De Shields received his 3rd Jeff Award (Outstanding Achievement in the category of Actor in a Supporting Role – Musical) for his role as King Louie, and garnered an Elliot Norton Awards nomination for Outstanding Musical Performance by an Actor as well as an IRNE Awards nomination for Best Supporting Actor – Musical.

De Shields portrayed Barrett Rude Sr. in The Fortress of Solitude, the musical based on Jonathan Lethem's novel The Fortress of Solitude, since its inception in 2012 at Vassar College. The Fortress of Solitude premiered at the Dallas Theater Center in spring 2014, and the off-Broadway production of The Fortress of Solitude, co-produced with The Public Theater, ran through November 2014. De Shields, Lillias White, Stefanie Powers, and Georgia Engel starred in the new musical Gotta Dance, directed and choreographed by Jerry Mitchell. The musical began performances on December 13, 2015, at Chicago's Bank of America Theatre and ran through January 17, 2016.

=== 2019–present: Resurgence with Hadestown ===
De Shields played Hermes in the Broadway musical Hadestown, which began previews on March 22, 2019, at the Walter Kerr Theatre. He received the Tony Award for Best Featured Actor in a Musical for the role. He played his final performance on May 29, 2022. On January 26, 2021, it was announced that De Shields would reprise his role as Hermes in Live from Mount Olympus, a narrative podcast for tweens directed by Rachel Chavkin and Zhailon Levingston. The series was produced by The Onassis Foundation and TRAX from PRX. De Shields' co-stars include fellow Hadestown cast member Amber Gray, Divine Garland, Vinie Burrows, Kristen Sieh, and more.

De Shields appeared in John Mulaney's John Mulaney & the Sack Lunch Bunch in which he sang "Algebra Song!" The comedy/musical/variety special was released on Netflix on December 24, 2019. In 2020, he played the role of Chubby, a recurring character, in the television series Katy Keene on The CW. He has also appeared on the CBS series Elsbeth.

On December 28, 2020, it was announced that De Shields would star as Anton Ego in a benefit concert presentation of Ratatouille the Musical, an internet meme that originated on TikTok, inspired by the 2007 Disney/Pixar film. The concert streamed exclusively on TodayTix on January 1, 2021. De Shields appeared in Lin-Manuel Miranda's directorial debut film, tick, tick... BOOM!, released on Netflix on November 12, 2021, as a patron of the Moondance Diner in the musical scene for "Sunday", as well as other Broadway actors such as Chita Rivera, Renée Elise Goldsberry, Phillipa Soo, among others. He also plays the significant supporting role of Jack in the Netflix comedy Uncoupled, released in July 2022.

In September 2022, De Shields began performances as Uncle Ben in Death of a Salesman on Broadway at the Hudson Theatre. In March 2024, De Shields was announced to be portraying Old Deuteronomy in Cats at the Perelman Performing Arts Center in the summer of that year. He reprised his role when the production transferred to Broadway, earning another Tony nomination. He reprised his role as Hermes in the West End production of Hadestown together with the other stars of the original Broadway cast for a limited engagement from February to March 2025, during which the show was filmed for theatrical release.

== Personal life ==
De Shields is gay, but prefers to be described as "a Black man who is queer" or "a Black man who loves other men". He is also a "long-term survivor" of HIV, living with HIV for over 40 years, having been diagnosed during the early AIDS epidemic after noticing his lymph nodes were swollen when shaving before a Los Angeles performance on Ain't Misbehavin's 1980 national tour and being formally diagnosed in 1991. His partner of 17 years, Chico Kasinoir, died in June 1992 of AIDS-related lymphoma. Another partner of De Shields, a man named John whom he was with for two years, died of AIDS-related meningitis in 1995.

== Acting credits ==
=== Film ===
Year	Title	Role	Notes
1983	The American Snitch	Russ	Film debut
1987	Prison	Sandor	
1996	Extreme Measures	Teddy Dolson	
2009	The Good Heart	Scotty	
2011	The Inheritance	Uncle Grady	
2011	Bruce's Garden	Jack Reynolds	Short film
2014	The Backseat	Mr. Davies	
2015	Chloe and Theo	Mr. Sweet	
2021	Tick, Tick...Boom!	"Sunday" Legend	
2024	The Instigators	Mr. Kelly	
2025	The Entertainer	Horacio	Short film
2026	Hadestown: The Musical	Hermes	Filmed stage production

=== Television ===
Year	Title	Role	Notes
1983	Great Performances	Tweedledum	Episode: "Alice in Wonderland"
1985	I Dream of Jeannie... Fifteen Years Later	Haji	TV Movie
1995–1996	Another World	Marshall Lincoln Kramer III	296 episodes
1996–2000	Law & Order	Mr. Miller / Dr. Simmonds	2 episodes
1997	Cosby	Larry	Episode: "Older and Out"
1998–2000	As the World Turns	Reverend Dansby	2 episodes
2002	Sex and the City	Pat	Episode: "Change of a Dress"
2008	Lipstick Jungle	Dragqueen	Episode: "Nothing Sacred"
2008	Life on Mars	Bartender	Episode: "My Maharishi Is Bigger Than Your Maharishi"
2010	Rescue Me	Paul	Episode: "Cowboy"
2014–2021	Law & Order: Special Victims Unit	Keys	2 episodes
2019	John Mulaney & the Sack Lunch Bunch	The Tutor	Netflix children's musical special
2020	Almost Family	Wyndham	Episode: "Generator AF"
2020	Katy Keene	Chubby	4 episodes
2021	New Amsterdam	Dale Rustin	Episode: "The Legend of Howie Cournemeyer"
2022	Blue Bloods	Mitchell	Episode: "Guilt"
2022	Uncoupled	Jack	3 episodes
2023	And Just Like That...	Gene	Episode: "The Last Supper Part 2"
2024	Brilliant Minds	Harold	Episode: "Pilot"
2024–2025	Elsbeth	Matteo Hart	2 episodes
2025	Everybody's Live with John Mulaney	Chesterton Cheadle	Episode: "What's the Best Way To Fire Someone?"

=== Theatre ===
Year	Production	Role	Venue	Notes
1969–1970	Hair	Hud	CIBC Theatre	Chicago
1973	Warp!	Desi Arnaz / Chaos	Ambassador Theatre	Broadway
1973	Rachael Lily Rosenbloom (And Don't You Ever Forget It)	Performer	Broadhurst Theatre	Broadway
1974	Joseph and the Amazing Technicolor Dreamcoat	Asher / Pharaoh	Playhouse in the Park	Philadelphia
1974	The Wiz	The Wiz	Fisher Theatre / Forrest Theatre	Regional
1974–1976	The Wiz	The Wiz	Majestic Theatre	Broadway
1976–1977	The Wiz	The Wiz	US Tour	Regional
1978	Ain't Misbehavin	Performer	Longacre Theatre	Broadway
1979	Ain't Misbehavin	Performer	US Tour	Regional
1982	Ain't Misbehavin	Performer	Longacre Theatre	Broadway
1984	André De Shields' Haarlem Nocturne	Performer	Latin Quarter	Broadway
1985	Just So	Eldest Magician	Audrey Wood Theater	Off-Broadway
1987	Stardust: The Mitchell Parrish Musical	Performer	Samuel J. Friedman Theatre	Broadway
1988–1989	Ain't Misbehavin	Performer	Ambassador Theatre	Broadway
1992–1993	The Wiz	The Wiz	US Tour	Regional
1997	Play On!	Jester	Brooks Atkinson Theatre	Broadway
1998	Play On!	Jester	Goodman Theatre	Chicago
1998–1999	Waiting for Godot	Vladimir	Goodman Theatre	Chicago
2000–2001	The Full Monty	Noah T. "Horse" Simmons	Eugene O'Neill Theatre	Broadway
2002	The Full Monty	Noah T. "Horse" Simmons	Prince of Wales Theatre	West End
2003	Ghosts	Jacob Strand	Harman Center for the Arts	Washington D.C.
2004	Prymate	Graham	Longacre Theatre	Broadway
2006–2007	King Lear	Lear	Folger Shakespeare Library	Washington D.C.
2009	Impressionism	Chiambuane	Gerald Schoenfeld Theatre	Broadway
2011	The Witch of Edmonton	Old Banks	Red Bull Theatre	London
2013	The Jungle Book	King Louie	Goodman Theatre	Chicago
2014	The Fortress of Solitude	Barrett Rude, Sr.	The Public Theater	Off-Broadway
2015	King Hedley II	Stool Pigeon	Arena Stage	Washington D.C.
2016	1776	Stephen Hopkins	NYCC Encores!	Off-Broadway
2016	The Taming of the Shrew	Gremio / Vincentio / Curtis	Sidney Harman Hall	Washington D.C.
2017	As You Like It	Touchstone	Classic Stage Company	Off-Broadway
2018–2019	Hadestown	Hermes	Royal National Theatre	London
2019–2020	Hadestown	Hermes	Walter Kerr Theatre	Broadway
2021–2022	Hadestown	Hermes	Walter Kerr Theatre	Broadway
2022–2023	Death of a Salesman	Uncle Ben Loman	Hudson Theatre	Broadway
2024	Cats: The Jellicle Ball	Old Deuteronomy	Perelman Performing Arts Center	Off-Broadway
2025	Hadestown	Hermes	Lyric Theatre	West End
2025	Tartuffe	Tartuffe	House of the Redeemer	Off-Broadway
2026	Cats: The Jellicle Ball	Old Deuteronomy	Broadhurst Theatre	Broadway

== Awards and nominations ==
Year	Association	Category	Production	Result
1978	Drama Desk Award	Outstanding Actor in a Musical	Ain't Misbehavin'	Nominated
1982	Primetime Emmy Award	Outstanding Individual Performance in a Variety or Music Program	Ain't Misbehavin'	Won
1984	AUDELCO Recognition Award	Outstanding Direction of a Musical	Blackberries	Won
1984	AUDELCO Recognition Award	Outstanding Choreography of a Musical	Blackberries	Won
1991	AUDELCO Recognition Award	Excellence in Black Theatre	Saint Tous	Won
1992	AUDELCO Recognition Award	Excellence in Black Theatre	Haarlem Nocturne	Won
1997	Tony Award	Best Featured Actor in a Musical	Play On!	Nominated
1997	Drama Desk Award	Outstanding Featured Actor in a Musical	Play On!	Nominated
2001	Tony Award	Best Featured Actor in a Musical	The Full Monty	Nominated
2001	Drama Desk Award	Outstanding Featured Actor in a Musical	The Full Monty	Nominated
2001	Outer Critics Circle Award	Outstanding Featured Actor in a Musical	The Full Monty	Won
2004	Drama Desk Award	Outstanding Featured Actor in a Play	Prymate	Nominated
2004	AUDELCO Recognition Award	Outstanding Performance by a Lead Actor in a Play	Dream on Monkey Mountain	Won
2007	Honorary Doctor of Fine Arts, University of Wisconsin–Madison			Won
2007	Obie Award	Sustained Excellence of Performance		Won
2008	Drama Desk Award	Outstanding Actor in a Musical	Black Nativity	Nominated
2009	AUDELCO Recognition Award	Outstanding Performance in a Musical [Male]	Archbishop Supreme Tartuffe	Won
2009	National Black Theatre Festival	Living Legend Award		Won
2013	Jeff Award	Outstanding Actor in a Supporting Role – Musical	The Jungle Book	Won
2013	IRNE Award	Best Supporting Actor - Musical	The Jungle Book	Nominated
2013	Elliot Norton Award	Outstanding Musical Performance by an Actor	The Jungle Book	Nominated
2013	Fox Foundation Fellowship Grant for Distinguished Achievement ($25,000 to support his work at the Victory Gardens Theatre in Chicago)			Won
2014	AUDELCO Recognition Award	Special Achievement Award		Won
2018	Bistro Awards	Bob Harrington Lifetime Achievement Award		Won
2019	Tony Award	Best Featured Actor in a Musical	Hadestown	Won
2019	Drama Desk Award	Outstanding Featured Actor in a Musical	Hadestown	Won
2019	Drama League Award	Distinguished Performance	Hadestown	Nominated
2019	Outer Critics Circle Award	Outstanding Featured Actor in a Musical	Hadestown	Won
2020	Grammy Award	Best Musical Theater Album	Hadestown	Won
2025	Drama Desk Award	Outstanding Featured Performance in a Musical	Cats: The Jellicle Ball	Nominated
2025	Drama League Award	Distinguished Performance	Cats: The Jellicle Ball	Nominated
2025	Dorian Awards	Outstanding Featured Performance in an Off-Broadway Production	Cats: The Jellicle Ball	Won
2025	Outer Critics Circle Award	Outstanding Featured Performer in an Off-Broadway Musical	Cats: The Jellicle Ball	Won
2026	Drama League Award	Distinguished Performance	Cats: The Jellicle Ball	Nominated
2026	Tony Award	Best Featured Actor in a Musical	Cats: The Jellicle Ball	Nominated

== See also ==
- African-American Tony nominees and winners
