= Paul Jabara =

American songwriter (1948–1992)

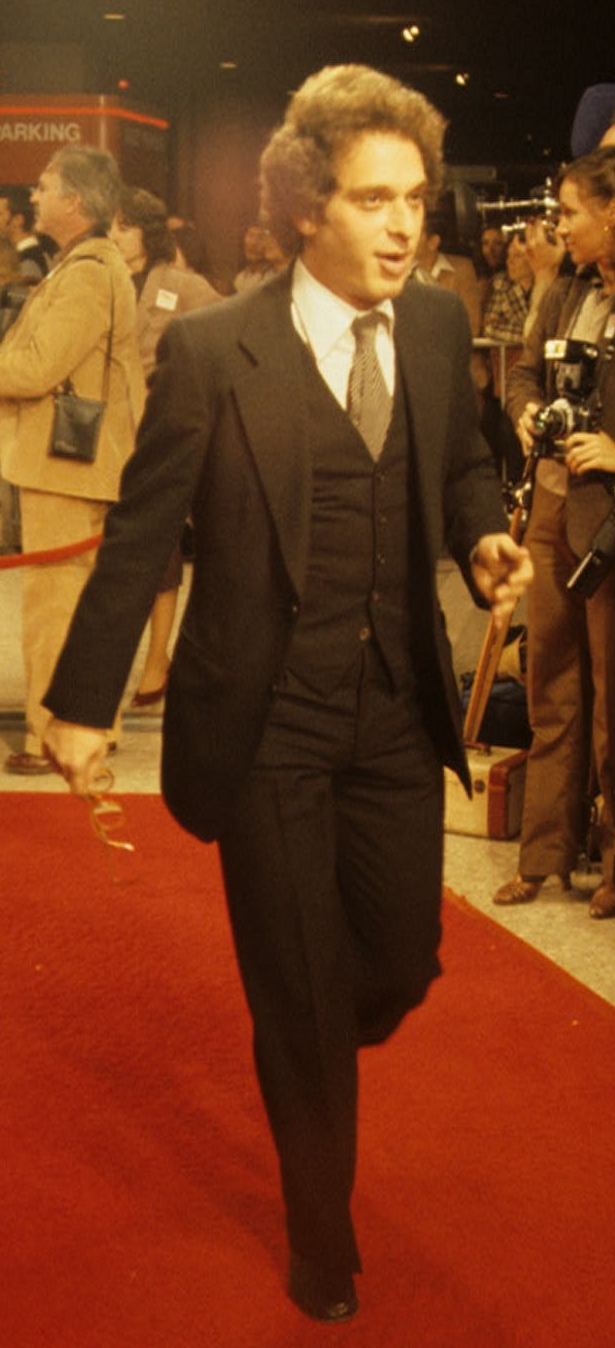
- Jabara at the premiere of The Rose in 1979
- Born: Paul Frederick Jabara; January 31, 1948; Brooklyn, New York, U.S.
- Died: September 29, 1992 (aged 44); Los Angeles, California, U.S.
- Occupations: Actor; singer; songwriter
- Years active: 1960s–1992

Paul Frederick Jabara (January 31, 1948 – September 29, 1992) was an American actor, singer, and songwriter. He wrote Donna Summer's Oscar-winning "Last Dance" from Thank God It's Friday (1978), as well as "No More Tears (Enough Is Enough)", Summer's international hit duet with Barbra Streisand. He also co-wrote the Weather Girls' iconic hit "It's Raining Men" with Paul Shaffer.

== Early life ==
Jabara was born and raised in Bay Ridge, Brooklyn, New York, to Lebanese parents Saleem (Arabic: سليم جبرا) and Olga Jabara (Arabic: أولغا جبارة). He graduated from Fort Hamilton High School in 1965, and briefly attended Long Island University in Brooklyn. His sisters, Delores and Claudette, also graduated from the same high school.

== Acting career ==
Jabara's Broadway debut was in the original cast of the stage musical Hair. He originated the role of King Herod in the London production of Jesus Christ Superstar.

In 1969, he appeared in John Schlesinger's film Midnight Cowboy, as a hippie handing out pills ("Up or Down?") at the counterculture party.

He moved to Los Angeles in the 1970s and acted in a number of films during the decade. He took over the role of Frank-N-Furter in the Los Angeles production of The Rocky Horror Show when Tim Curry left the production to film the movie version in England. He also appeared in Schlesinger's 1975 film The Day of the Locust, where he sang a cover of the Marlene Dietrich song "Hot Voo-Doo" in drag.

Jabara played the role of a lovelorn and nearsighted disco-goer named Carl in the 1978 film Thank God It's Friday. He contributed the song "Last Dance" to the film's soundtrack, which went on to win an Academy Award and a Grammy Award. He also contributed as a singer on two tracks on the original soundtrack.

In 1981, Jabara starred in another John Schlesinger film, the comedy Honky Tonk Freeway, as truck driver/songwriter T. J. Tupus, hauling lions and a rhino. He also made appearances in The Lords of Flatbush (1974) and Legal Eagles (1986).

== Songwriter and singer ==
Jabara wrote the book, music, lyrics and starred in the aborted Broadway musical Rachael Lily Rosenbloom (And Don't You Ever Forget It) when he was 24 years old. The musical starred Ellen Greene, and played the Broadhurst Theatre in New York City in 1973. It closed in previews prior to its official opening and was never reviewed by the press. No recording was made of the score, which featured both Jabara's trademark disco music and traditional Broadway-style numbers.

In 1976, Jabara contributed a song to the 20th Century Fox motion picture sound track of Mother, Jugs & Speed, starring Bill Cosby, Raquel Welch and Harvey Keitel. The upbeat, disco-flavored "Dance", both written and sung by Jabara, was popular in clubs featuring high energy dance music.

Jabara released his debut album Shut Out in 1977. Jabara's solo albums on the disco label Casablanca Records include three duets with Donna Summer: "Shut Out" (1977), "Something's Missing (In My Life)" (1978) and "Never Lose Your Sense of Humor" (1979).

Donna Summer performed his song "Last Dance" for the 1978 film Thank God It's Friday winning Jabara the Grammy Award for Best R&B Song, the Academy Award for Best Original Song, and the Golden Globe Award for Best Original Song.

In 1979, with Bruce Roberts, he co-wrote Barbra Streisand's top 3 hit "The Main Event/Fight", and the pair wrote their biggest success with the international smash "No More Tears (Enough Is Enough)", recorded as a duet by Streisand and Donna Summer.

In 1981, he wrote "No Jinx" for Bette Midler as the theme tune to her movie Jinxed!. Diana Ross scored a 1982 UK top hit with his song "Work That Body".

In 1982, Two Tons O' Fun, renaming themselves as the Weather Girls, agreed to record his song "It's Raining Men", previously rejected by Summer, Streisand, Cher and Ross. The song became an international hit, topping the US Dance chart and peaking at No. 2 in the UK. That song was re-recorded in 1998 by RuPaul and Martha Wash as "It's Raining Men... The Sequel" and later by Geri Halliwell in 2001, when it reached No. 1 on the UK Singles Chart.

The original Weather Girls recording of "It's Raining Men" was included on Jabara's 1983 album Paul Jabara & Friends, which included one of the early recordings by then 19-year-old Whitney Houston on "Eternal Love" (previously recorded by Stephanie Mills) as well as a Jabara/Diana Ross co-write "Ladies Hot Line". Other songs Jabara had covered by major artists include "Hope" by Billy Preston (1981), "Two Lovers" by Julio Iglesias (1984) and "This Girl's Back in Town" by Raquel Welch (1987).

In 1986, Jabara released his final album, the concept musical De La Noche: The True Story – A Poperetta, featuring guest vocals from Leata Galloway, Diva Gray and Pattie Brooks.

In 2005, a workshop of a musical titled Last Dance played New York City. It was a musical assembled from Jabara's well known disco songs and told the story of a modern-day teenager who goes back in time to spend one night at Studio 54.

== Death ==
On September 29, 1992, Jabara died from complications from AIDS in Los Angeles, at the age of 44. A memorial service was held on October 4, 1992, at the Forest Lawn Cemetery, in the Hollywood Hills. Jabara is buried at Green-Wood Cemetery.

He died at his Los Angeles home and was survived by his sisters, Delores Jabara and Claudette Haddad, who took care of his estate until her death in 2023.At the time of his death, major outlets, including The New York Times and the Los Angeles Times, were simply told by a spokesman and Claudette, respectively, that he had died due to "a long illness". This was possibly due to stigma of AIDS.

On June 14, 2014, Jabara was featured in the first gay-themed tour of Green-Wood Cemetery.

== Discography ==
=== Studio albums ===
- Shut Out (Casablanca Records, 1977)
- Keeping Time (Casablanca, 1978)
- The Third Album (Casablanca, 1979)
- Paul Jabara & Friends, with the Weather Girls, Leata Galloway, Whitney Houston (Columbia/CBS, 1983)
- De La Noche: The True Story – A Poperetta with Leata Galloway (Warner Bros., 1986)

=== Soundtracks and compilations ===
- Original Soundtrack − Thank God It's Friday
- Greatest Hits... and Misses (Casablanca/PolyGram, 1989)
- The Casablanca Records Story (PolyGram, 1994)
- Mother, Jugs and Speed soundtrack

=== Singles ===
- "One Man Ain't Enough" (1975)
- "Dance" (1976)
- "Yankee Doodle Dandy" (1976)
- "Shut Out" duet with Donna Summer (1977)
- "Slow Dancing" (1977)
- "Dancin' (Lift Your Spirits Higher)" (1978)
- "Pleasure Island" (1978)
- "Take Good Care of My Baby" / "What's a Girl to Do", Paul Jabara & Pattie Brooks (1978)
- "Trapped in a Stairway" (1978)
- "Disco Queen" (1978)
- "Saturday Matinee" (1978)
- "Never Lose Your Sense of Humor", duet with Donna Summer (1979)
- "Disco Wedding" (1979)
- "Honeymoon (In Puerto Rico)" (1979)
- "Disco Divorce" (1979)
- "Ocho Rios" (1986)
- "This Girl's Back in Town" (1986)

== Filmography ==
Paul Jabara film and television credits
| Year | Title | Role | Notes |
|---|---|---|---|
| 1969 | Midnight Cowboy | The Party No. 2 | Film |
| 1969 | Medea | Pelias | Film |
| 1970 | The Out-of-Towners | First Hippie (uncredited) | Film |
| 1970 | Necropolis | (uncredited) | Film |
| 1971 | Been Down So Long It Looks Like Up to Me | Heap | Film |
| 1971 | The Ski Bum | Rocco | Film |
| 1973 | Brothers Blue | Teddy Fog | Film |
| 1974 | The Lords of Flatbush | Crazy Cohen | Film |
| 1974 | The Last Angry Man | Myron Malkin | ABC Movie of the Week |
| 1975 | The Day of the Locust | Nightclub Entertainer | Film |
| 1975 | Peeper | Janitor | Film |
| 1978 | Thank God It's Friday | Carl | Film |
| 1981 | Honky Tonk Freeway | T.J. Tupus | Film |
| 1985 | The Equalizer | Music Teacher | Episode: "China Rain" |
| 1986 | Legal Eagles | Taxi Driver | Film |
| 1987 | Les Patterson Saves the World | Leroy | Film |
| 1989 | Slaves of New York | Derelict | Film |
| 1991 | 9 1/2 Ninjas! | Mr. Ninja (voice) | Film |
| 1992 | Light Sleeper | Eddie | Film |
| 1992 | L.A. Law | Reporter No. 1 | 1 episode |
