= Robert Guerra =

Robert Guerra may refer to:

- Robert Guerra (art director), American film and theatre director
- Robert Guerra (politician) (born 1953), Texas politician

== See also ==
- Roberto Guerra (born 1979), Cuban boxer
