= José Valencia =

Jose Valencia is the name of:

- Jose F. Valencia, Ecuadorian American College President
- José Daniel Valencia (born 1955), Argentine footballer
- José Valencia (footballer, born 1982), Ecuadorian footballer
- José Adolfo Valencia (born 1991), Colombian footballer
- Jose Hector Valencia, a Mexican pilot the victim of Aeroméxico Flight 498
