= Richard Fire =

American actor and writer (1945–2015)

- Born: November 12, 1945; Paterson, New Jersey, U.S.
- Died: July 8, 2015 (aged 69); Red Bank, New Jersey, U.S.
- Occupations: Actor, writer

Richard Fire (November 12, 1945 – July 8, 2015) was an American theater actor and writer based in Chicago. He was also an Emmy Award winner.

== Biography ==
Fire was born in Paterson, New Jersey. He originally started at a theater department at the University of Wisconsin–Madison. Stuart Gordon later joined him to the cast of Chicago's Organic Theater Company.

== Theater credits ==
- Warp! (1971)
- Bleacher Bums (1977)
- E/R Emergency Room (1982)
- Dr. Rat (1982)

== Filmography ==
- Henry: Portrait of a Serial Killer (1986)
- Poltergeist III (1988)
