= Keeping Time =

Studio album by Paul Jabara
- Released: May 1978
- Genre: Disco
- Label: Casablanca NBLP 7102
- Producer: Bob Esty

Paul Jabara chronology
| Shut Out (1977) | Keeping Time (1978) | The Third Album (1979) |

Keeping Time is the second studio album by American actor, singer and songwriter Paul Jabara. The album, which was released on Casablanca Records in 1978, includes Jabara's song "Trapped in a Stairway" from the movie Thank God It's Friday, his own version of the Grammy Award-winning "Last Dance" (originally recorded by Donna Summer) as well as the duets "Something's Missing" (with Summer) and "Take Good Care of My Baby / What's a Girl to Do" (with Pattie Brooks). Keeping Time was released on CD by Gold Legion in 2011.

== Singles ==
The lead single from the album was "Dancin' (Lift Your Spirits Higher)".

Take Good Care Of My Baby/What's A Girl To Do was released as a single too. Cash Box wrote that the single was "a medley" featuring Pattie Brooks, with "strings, horns and disco beat" making it "a good disco, R&B add".

== Critical reception ==
Betty Lederer from Billboard, elected "Pleasure Island" as the best cut of the album, the magazine also choose the album as the best disco album of the week, giving it a favorable review. Cash Box wrote that the singer "has issued an appealing new effort" highlighting his "catchy, flowing compositions" and "smooth vocal style", with "shimmering production" by Bob Esty.

The album was listed in the "Fringe Albums Continued" section of Walrus! which wrote that Jabara, although "a pop artist", was also "a songwriter with quite a knack for appealing songs", and that "it's all in the direction the production takes". It was also included in Record World's "Album Picks" of the week; the magazine wrote: "Look out for this versatile musician on the rise".

== Commercial performance ==
The album peaked at number 12 in the National Disco Action Top 40.

== Track listing ==
Keeping Time – Side one
| No. | Title | Writer(s) | Length |
|---|---|---|---|
| 1. | "Didn't the Time Go Fast" | Paul Jabara | 4:17 |
| 2. | "Saturday Matinee" | Charles Irwin, Paul Jabara | 3:24 |
| 3. | "Trapped in a Stairway" (from the Original Soundtrack Album Thank God It's Friday) | Bob Esty, Paul Jabara | 3:13 |
| 4. | "Take Good Care of My Baby / What's a Girl to Do" (duet with Pattie Brooks) | Carole King, Gerry Goffin, Paul Jabara | 4:47 |
| 5. | "Dancin' (Lift Your Spirits Higher)" | Bob Esty, Michele Aller, Paul Jabara | 3:39 |

Keeping Time – Side two
| No. | Title | Writer(s) | Length |
|---|---|---|---|
| 1. | "Last Dance" | Paul Jabara | 3:10 |
| 2. | "Pleasure Island" | Bob Esty, Paul Jabara | 10:40 |
| 3. | "Something's Missing" (duet with Donna Summer) | Jay Asher, Paul Jabara | 3:02 |

== Personnel ==
- Paul Jabara - vocals
- Jay Graydon, Steve Lukather, Ira Newborn, Thom Rotella, Ben Benay - guitar
- David Hungate, Chuck Rainey, Bob Glaub - bass guitar
- David Foster, Richard Tee, Jai Winding, Bob Esty, William Smith, Bill Payne - keyboards
- Mike Baird, Ed Greene, Rick Shlosser - drums
- Alan Estes, Victor Feldman, Tommy Vig - percussion
- Jerry Jumonville - saxophone on "Trapped on a Stairway"
- Bernie Fleischer, Jon Kip, Jack Nimitz - flutes on "Pleasure Island"
- Bob Esty, Carlene Williams, Mary Ellen Gaines, Becky Lopez, Dani MiCormick, Patti Brooks, Petsye Powell, Carole Bayer Sager, Michele Aller, Brenda Russell - background vocals
