= Betwixt! =

- A Funny Musical
- Music: Ian McFarlane
- Lyrics: Ian McFarlane
- Book: Ian McFarlane
- Productions: 2008 London Fringe; 2011 London Off-West End

Betwixt! is a musical comedy conceived and written by Ian McFarlane. It also played a concert version in the West End at the Ambassadors Theatre.

== Production history ==
=== 2008 London Fringe ===
The show premiered in The King's Head Theatre London on 6 May 2008 and finished its first run on 22 June 2008. The production was directed by Kate Golledge, choreographed by Lucie Pankhurst with musical direction by Robert Emery. The cast included Abi Finley as Miranda.

=== 2008 Concert ===
On 14 October 2008, Betwixt! played at the Ambassadors Theatre, produced by Christopher D. Clegg. The cast included Tim Howar as Bailey, Rosemary Ashe as Langwidere, Sarah Lark as April McScoup, Sheridan Smith as Princess Ariella and Stefan Booth as Haydn Prince/Prince Haydn. The cast also included the London Gay Men's Chorus as "The Taravatanians" and an ensemble provided by Arts Ed drama school.

=== 2011 West End ===
Producer Christopher D. Clegg brought the musical back to London in 2011 with a production in the smaller Off West End space at Trafalgar Studios. The show featured several new songs, with direction by Ian McFarlane. The production opened on 26 July and ran until 10 September.

Cast

- The Princess/the Nymph Queen/the Enchantress - Ellen Greene
- Prince Haydn/Haydn Prince/the Great Garbo - Peter Duncan
- Bailey - Benedict Salter
- Cooper - Steven Webb
- Miranda - Ashleigh Gray

== Musical numbers ==
From the 2011 West End Production

Act I

- Opening
- How Do You Know 'Til You Try Me (Which You Haven't and You Should)?
- The Embassy's Predicament
- Eyes of a Child
- Fabulous Man
- Just One Kiss

Act II

- Miranda's Aria
- Strange Sort of Love Song
- How Do You Know 'Til You Try Me (Which You Haven't and You Should)? (Reprise)
- Eyes of a Child (Reprise)
- Fabulous Plan
- Prince Haydn's Vision/Strange Sort of Love Song (Reprise)
- Paparazzi Rag
- Between
- Finale
