= Alexander Gelman =

Theatre director

- Born: Aleksandr Simonovich Gelman; December 21, 1960 (age 65); Leningrad, USSR
- Education: Birmingham–Southern College; Boston University
- Occupation: Theatre director
- Parent(s): Maria Gelman; Simon Gelman

Alexander Gelman (born December 21, 1960), born: Aleksandr Simonovich Gelman (Russian: Алекса́ндр Си́монович Ге́льман) is an American theater director and the current Producing Artistic Director of Organic Theater Company in Chicago, Illinois.

== Early life ==
Alexander Gelman was born in Leningrad, USSR to Maria Gelman, a musician, and Simon Gelman, a physician. Both of his maternal grandparents worked at the Mikhaylovsky Theatre and young Alexander (Sasha) literally took his first steps there. In 1973, the family emigrated to Israel and in 1976 to the USA. In 1978, he graduated from Charles F. Brush High School in Lyndhurst, Ohio.

== Training ==
Gelman received his BFA in theatre from Birmingham–Southern College (1982) and his MFA in Directing from Boston University (1985) He also spends a month at the University of Illinois at a Directing Colloquium conducted by Edwin Sherin, Arvin Brown, John Reich, Garland Wright, Clifford Williams, Vinnette Carroll, and Gerald Freedman.

== Career ==
After moving to New York City in 1985, Gelman began to work as translator and director, after a period of working for NYANA, a refugee resettlement agency (his co-workers there included painter Roman Turovsky, film director Todd Solondz and novelist Gary Shteyngart).

One of his early directing engagements was Carmen at Chattanooga Symphony and Opera, which was his first collaboration with Vakhtang Jordania. At this time, he also began his work as assistant and interpreter to Russian directors working in the US. The first one was Yuri Lyubimov at Arena Stage, on a production of Crime and Punishment. The two later worked on Master and Margarita at American Repertory Theatre in Cambridge and Lulu at the Lyric Opera of Chicago. He also directed the film Infinity, starring Megan Blake.

After a number of years freelancing as director and translator, he accepted a position of Head of Directing at the University of Nebraska–Lincoln (1991), where he stayed until 1994. At that time, he moved to Salt Lake City, where he took over the directing program at the University of Utah. This began a long and fruitful relationship with Utah Opera and Anne Ewers, its General Director. Among the productions there, he directed Eugene Onegin, L'incoronazione di Poppea, The Turn of the Screw and many others. During this time, he also directed in New Zealand at Canterbury Opera, where he collaborated with Dame Malvina Major. Gelman had additional engagements at Idaho Opera, Ashland-Highland Music Festival and others.

In 2001, he was appointed Director of the School of Theatre and Dance at Northern Illinois University. In 2006, he became Producing Artistic Director of the Organic Theater Company of Chicago. At the Organic, he has directed his own adaptations of The $30,000 Bequest by Mark Twain, Bartleby, the Scrivener by Herman Melville, and Joseph Conrad's The Secret Agent. He also directed Eugène Ionesco's Man with Bags, Friedrich Dürrenmatt's Play Strindberg, and Shimizu Kunio's The Dressing Room.
