= Shut Out (album) =

Studio album by Paul Jabara
- Released: May 1977
- Genre: Disco
- Label: Casablanca
- Producers: Ron Dante, Stan Vincent, Arthur G. Wright, Marc Paul Simon

Paul Jabara chronology
Shut Out (1977)	Keeping Time (1978)

Shut Out is the debut album by American actor, singer and songwriter Paul Jabara.

The album which was released on the Casablanca Records label in 1977 includes the singles "Shut Out" (a duet with Donna Summer), "Dance" and "Slow Dancing". The original LP was pressed on red vinyl.

Shut Out has yet to be re-released on CD.

== Singles ==
"Yankee Doodle Dandy" was released as a single with "Sun In Your Smile" as its b-side (A&M Records, catalog no. 1810-S). Cash Box described the song as a "fascinating arrangement" of the standard, praising Jabara's "extremely funky arrangement" and noting that the song had "a real good shot at the pop and disco market", adding that it possessed "substance" unlike "standard Bicentennial fare". "Shut Out" was released as the next single, the mentioned magazine described the song as a "disco fairy tale" and an "upbeat tune", highlighting Donna Summer's guest appearance on the track. The cut "Shut Out/Heaven Is A Disco/Dance" peaked at #31 on Billboard's Dance Music/Club Play Singles in 1977.

== Critical reception ==
Professional ratings
Review scores
Source	Rating
AllMusic	3/5 stars

Billboard described the album as "a disco product produced with Munich-like precision" and noted that the singer often approached disco themes with "near satirical humor". Cash Box wrote that the tracks combines "disco-flavored and soft melodic tunes", praising Jabara's "unusual commerciality" and highlighting appearances and influences from Donna Summer, as well as vocal styles reminiscent of Neil Sedaka and Smokey Robinson. Record World described it as "one of the most entertaining albums of the season", highlighting its "big, brassy, all-out production", "pop disco with Broadway show overtones", and praising Donna Summer's guest appearance as "a highlight", while noting that the production "swirls and soars non-stop". The Walrus! described it as "totally pop", noting that its first side is focused on "white disco (unfunky)" while the second is "oriented toward songs", and highlighting the album's "big production".

== Track listing ==
Shut Out – Side one
No.	Title	Writer(s)	Length
1.	"Medley: Shut Out / Heaven Is a Disco"	Paul Jabara, Bob Esty (Shut Out); Paul Jabara (Heaven Is a Disco)	9:30
2.	"Dance"	Paul Jabara	3:50
3.	"Slow Dancing"	Paul Jabara	5:00
Total length:			18:20

Shut Out – Side two
No.	Title	Writer(s)	Length
1.	"Yankee Doodle Dandy"	George M. Cohan (arranjo por Paul Jabara)	3:10
2.	"Hungry for Love"	Paul Jabara	4:35
3.	"Sun in Your Smile"	Paul Jabara	3:02
4.	"Smile"	Paul Jabara	3:36
5.	"It All Comes Back to You"	Paul Jabara	4:49
Total length:			19:12

== Credits ==
Credits adapted from the LP back cover (Casablanca, catalog no. NBLP 7055)

- Recorded at The Record Plant, Los Angeles, Media Sound, New York and The Hit Factory, New York
- Executive producers: Marc Paul Simon and Paul Jabara
- Mastered by Allen Zentz Mastering
- Photography: Michael Childers
- Art Direction: Phyllis Chotin and Marc Paul Simon
- Design: Stephen Lumel/Gribbitt!

Producers

- Arthur G. Wright & Marc Paul Simon ("Shut Out/Heaven Is A Disco")
- Ron Dante ("Dance", "Yankee Doodle Dandy", "Hungry For Love", "Sun In Your Smile", "It All Comes Back")
- Stan Vincent ("Slow Dancing" & "Smile")

Arrangers

- Arthur G. Wright ("Shut Out/Heaven Is A Disco")
- Paul Shaffer ("Dance", "Hungry For Love", "Sun In Your Smile" & "It All Comes Back")
- Stan Vincent ("Slow Dancing" & "Smile")
- Bob Esty ("Yankee Doodle Dandy")

Engineers

- Deni King ("Shut Out/Heaven Is A Disco")
- Bill Radice ("Slow Dancing" & "Smile")
- Larry Forkner ("Yankee Doodle Dandy")

Re-mix Engineers:

- Larry Emerine ("Dance")
- Deni King ("Yankee Doodle Dandy", "Hungry For Love", "Smile", "Sun In Your Smile" & "It All Comes Back")
- "Phil Jamtaas, assistant engineer on "Shut Out/Heaven Is A Disco"
- "Slow Dancing" & "Smile" scored by Tony Davilio

== Charts ==
Weekly chart performance for Shut Out
Chart (1978)	Peak position
Australia (Kent Music Report)	55
