= New York Association for New Americans =

Refugee assistance agency

The New York Association for New Americans (NYANA) was a UJC agency for refugee assistance located on the Battery in New York City.

NYANA was founded in 1949 as a local arm of the Jewish United Service for New Americans to assist in the resettlement of refugees from the Holocaust coming to the United States in the aftermath of World War II. In the 1950s it served Jewish immigrants from Romania, Greece, Hungary, and Egypt, and in the 1960s from Cuba, Czechoslovakia, and Poland. After Jews were allowed to leave the USSR in the mid-1970s, it expanded to assist large numbers of Jewish refugees from the former USSR, approximately 250,000 by 2004. But it also served non-Jewish refugees, beginning in 1972 with Ugandans and continuing with Southeast Asian boat people, Cambodians, Tibetans, and others. It is estimated to have served 500,000 people during its existence. Its headquarters were in the Whitehall Building on Battery Place in Lower Manhattan, and it had a satellite office in Queens.

NYANA sought from its inception to provide one-stop services to refugees, including assistance finding housing, health, mental health and family services, an English as a Second Language school, vocational training, and licensing courses in addition to legal help with immigration and adjustment. As the number of refugees from the former Soviet Union declined, it reshaped itself under the direction of Jose Valencia, who held many internal leadership positions before being appointed CEO in 2004, to serve the broader immigrant population, also offering citizenship assistance, a center for women and families, a mental-health clinic, and a substance-abuse program and programs in workforce and economic development, community development, and bi-culturation.

The NYANA English School taught incoming refugees as much English as possible in intensive classes. Initially the NYANA Method was aural/oral, based on the ulpan method used to teach Hebrew to new immigrants in Israel and using a short in-house textbook. Teachers were recruited from the performing arts community and included Todd Solondz. However, in 1995 the school converted to a more conventional four-skills curriculum. In the late 1990s as numbers of refugees declined, increasing numbers of clients were assigned to ESL classes in neighborhood centers under short-term government grants and the school greatly reduced.

At its peak, NYANA served 50,000 refugees per year, but shifting policies and needs caused this to decline to between 300 and 400 in 2007. Its peak budget was $90 million, which by 2008 had shrunk to $7.5 million. Joseph Lazar, a management consultant who was himself born in a displaced persons camp in the late 1940s, was hired as director and a fund-raising dinner was held, but it raised only about $50,000 and the decision was made to close the agency in summer 2008. Legal assistance cases were transferred to New York Legal Assistance Group, and the Business Center for New Americans, a department of NYANA providing financial and business services, became an independent economic development organization in 2009, changing its name in 2020 to Accompany Capital.

== Notable former NYANA employees ==
- Todd Solondz
- Alex Halberstadt
- Gary Shteyngart
- Roman Turovsky
- Alexander Gelman
- Jose F. Valencia, former CEO
