= The Third Album (Paul Jabara album) =

Studio album by Paul Jabara
- Released: August 1979
- Recorded: 1979
- Genre: Disco
- Length: 28:55
- Label: Casablanca NBLP 7163
- Producer: Paul Jabara

Paul Jabara chronology
Keeping Time (1978)	The Third Album (1979)	Paul Jabara & Friends (1983)

The Third Album is the third studio album by American actor, singer and songwriter Paul Jabara, released in 1979 by Casablanca Records. It features guest vocals by Donna Summer, who duets with Jabara on "Never Lose Your Sense of Humor". The album follows the story of newlyweds Vinnie and DeeDee, from their wedding and honeymoon to their divorce and eventual reconciliation. Its second side features a medley of songs from Jabara's off-Broadway musical Rachael Lily Rosenbloom (And Don't You Ever Forget It).

Critics offered mixed assessments of the album, with Billboard and Cash Box praising its disco arrangements and dance appeal, while High Fidelity criticized its lyrics and production. The album peaked at number 177 on Record World's US Top 200 Albums chart in 1979.

== Album details ==
The Third Album, whose title and cover picture paraphrases the Barbra Streisand album of the same name, was released in 1979 on the Casablanca Records label, and again features guest vocalist Donna Summer. In 1979 Jabara also composed the Streisand & Summer duet "No More Tears (Enough Is Enough)".

The album tells the story of newlyweds Vinnie and DeeDee, from their wedding ("Disco Wedding") to their honeymoon ("Honeymoon in Puerto Rico"), their eventual divorce ("Disco Divorce") and finally, their reunion ("Just You and Me.") Jabara voiced both Vinnie and DeeDee, as well as the justice of the peace who married them and the judge who presided over their divorce. The second side was dedicated to a medley of songs from Jabara's off-Broadway play Rachael Lily Rosenbloom (And Don't You Ever Forget It). The medley included the song "Never Lose Your Sense of Humor," a duet with Donna Summer.

The album includes the single releases "Disco Wedding" and "Never Lose Your Sense of Humor". Casablanca released "Disco Wedding" and "Honeymoon in Puerto Rico" as a 12-inch disco single. The Third Album was released on CD by Gold Legion on June 3, 2010, and manufactured by Universal Music Special Markets.

== Critical reception ==
Billboard noted that Jabara "showcases his singing skills" on his "disco opera" about a contemporary romance, calling Donna Summer's contribution to "Never Lose Your Sense of Humor" the album's "highlight". The magazine also praised the "churning orchestration" and characterized the record as "a pop flavored, broad based effort", selecting "Never Lose Your Sense of Humor" and "Just You and Me" as its best tracks. Cash Box considered it "one of the most riotous dancing LPs this year". The publication added that listeners would likely find themselves "laughing and doing the 'rock' at the same time" while listening to the album's songs. High Fidelity criticized the album's "uninspired" lyrics and dialogue, "unspectacular" production, and lack of the "zaniness and irreverence" expected from its disco wedding concept. He nevertheless praised the idea behind the project, writing that Jabara "deserves a nod" for bringing it to fruition. Petkanas considered Donna Summer's appearance on "Never Lose Your Sense of Humor" the album's most compelling moment, noting that she raised the energy level and that "everyone is sailing".

== Track listing ==
The Third Album – Side one
No.	Title	Writer(s)	Length
1.	"Medley" ("Disco Wedding"/"Honeymoon (In Puerto Rico)"/"Disco Divorce")	Paul Jabara; Greg Mathieson, Paul Jabara; Jay Asher, Paul Jabara	14:01

The Third Album – Side two
No.	Title	Writer(s)	Length
1.	"Medley" ("Foggy Day" / "Never Lose Your Sense Of Humor")	Paul Jabara; Donna Summer, Greg Mathieson, Paul Jabara	9:46
2.	"Just You And Me"	Greg Mathieson, Paul Jabara	5:08

== Personnel ==
- Greg Mathieson – arrangements, conductor, keyboards
- Brenda Russell, Brooklyn Dreams, Bruce Roberts, Julie Tillman Waters, Maxine Waters, Michelle Aller, Pat Ma Cloud, Pattie Brooks, Petsye Powell, Roberta Margarita Estes – backing vocals
- Scott Edwards – bass
- Sid Sharp – concertmaster
- Ed Greene (tracks: A1.1, A1.3, B1.2, B2), John Ferraro – drums
- Jay Graydon, Paul Jackson, Jr. (tracks: A1.1, A1.3, B1.2, B2), Tim May – guitar
- Gayle Levant – harp
- Paulinho Da Costa, Victor Feldman – percussion
- Gary Herbig, Larry Williams – saxophone
- Chuck Findley, Denny Christianson – trumpet
- Bob Stone – engineer, mixing

Notes

- Mixed at Larrabee Sound
- Mastered at Kendon Recorders

== Charts ==
Weekly chart performance for The Third Album
Chart (1979)	Peak position
US Top 200 Albums (Record World)	177
