= Glory! Glory! =

1989 comedy TV film

- Genre: Comedy-drama
- Written by: Stan Daniels; Bonny Dore; Larry Hovey
- Directed by: Lindsay Anderson
- Starring: Ellen Greene; Richard Thomas; James Whitmore; Barry Morse
- Music by: Christopher Dedrick
- Countries of origin: Canada; United States
- Original language: English

Production
- Executive producers: Bonny Dore; Leslie Greif
- Producers: Stan Daniels; Seaton McLean
- Cinematography: Mike Fask
- Editor: Ruth Foster
- Running time: 206 minutes (2 parts)
- Production companies: HBO; Atlantis Films (as Atlantis Films Limited); Orion Television; The Greif-Dore Company

Original release
- Network: HBO
- Release: February 19, 1989

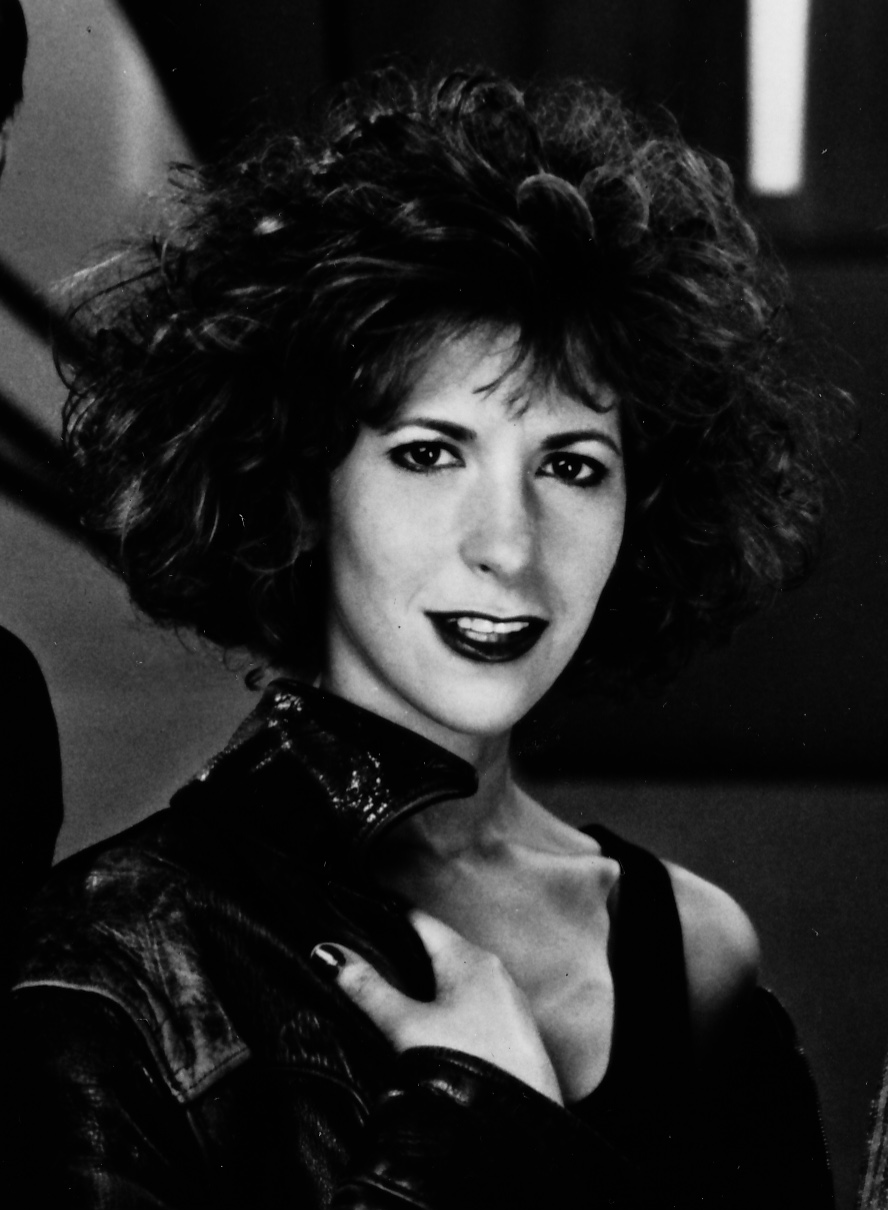
Ellen Greene in Glory! Glory!

Glory! Glory! is a 1989 satirical comedy film directed by Lindsay Anderson and starring Ellen Greene that originally aired on HBO in two parts. The film was Anderson's second American production.

In the film, a radio preacher's operation is covertly controlled by his son. When the father finds a more skilled (and less honest) talent agent to promote his act, he severs all ties with his son. The son has the idea to turn a female rock and roll singer into the televangelist and faith healer Sister Ruth. Her act is a success, but her craving for cocaine and her sexual promiscuity are threatening her reputation. Investigative reporters find out that Ruth had an abortion, and a church leader uses the information to blackmail her.

== Plot ==
A radio preacher's operation is controlled by his honest but bland son. When the preacher is made a media superstar by a savvy huckster, the son is left behind. Everything changes when the son wanders into a bar and witnesses the performance of a woman rock and roll singer. He realizes she is just what he needs to rise to the top of the world of televangelism.

At first, sister Ruth, the rock and roll singer, takes the job as for fame and money. She uses the church for drugs and eventually has a sexual relationship with the preacher's son named Bobby Joe. She also indulges in cocaine and is sexually promiscuous. We soon discover that she is pregnant and decides to have an abortion to help the church and herself to avoid scandal. She then shoots up the charts and becomes a national sensation. With the prospect of going on a national TV network. The network decides to make the show more exciting. They decide to have Sister Ruth do healings on air. At first she had actors, but eventually she is able to heal people. Which freaks her out and makes her think she is really a messenger of God.

Because of the show's popularity an investigative news show decides to profile them. They discover the alleged healed people were either fabricating their story or were temporarily healed. Sister Ruth feeling bad about not healing anyone ends up having an affair with the newsreporter. A church leader worried what Sister Ruth would tell the reporter. He decided that he would have her room bugged and caught the sexual encounter on tape. We soon discover that the news shows producers discover that a church leader stole 2 million dollars and hid it in Switzerland. Forcing his hand and getting the heat off of him. He decides to tell them that Sister Ruth had an abortion. They decide that they will ask her about it on the show. The news reporter decides to give Ruth a heads up. She tells the church leader and Bobby Joe. So the church leader pulls out the audio tapes of the affair and decides to blackmail him. He gives in and decides not to mention the abortion.

So the first national episode airs and Sister Ruth sings. She stops singing and tells the audience that at first she took the job because of the money and exposure and then tells them she had an abortion and that she quits. Rev. Bobby Joe comes out and tells the audience that he is a sinner and had a sexual relationship without being married. He admits to blackmail and other sinful things. And finally the church leader comes out and tells everybody that he is the guilty one and that Ruth and Bobby Joe should stay and gets the audience to cheer for them to stay. At the end everybody comes out and hold hands with the main stars, even Jesus Christ and Bobby Joe's dead father.

== Cast ==
- Ellen Greene as Ruth
- Richard Thomas as Rev. Bobby Joe
- James Whitmore as Lester Babbitt
- Winston Rekert as Chet
- Barry Morse as Rev. Dan Stuckey
- George Buza as Vincent
- Richard Alden as Sen. Monteith
- Philippe Ayoub as Aide

== Production ==
Despite the film drawing comparisons to the Jim Bakker scandal that was a news subject at the time of release, the script had originated long before in 1981. Co-writer Bonny Dore had experience polishing the broadcast TV speeches of evangelist Oral Roberts. Said Dore: "I began to see a parallel between a variety show performer and a certain kind of minister. And I asked myself what would happen if a Janis Joplin-type performer became an evangelical preacher putting her sermons across in song."

== Reception ==
The New York Times's John J. O'Connor commented the film is "an ambitious effort...[with] clever touches", but lacks a unifying theme and "is rarely as sharp or outrageous as it clearly intends". O'Connor praised Whitmore as a scene-stealer, but said Greene's performance appeared out of sync with the rest of the cast.

In a positive review for the Los Angeles Times, Howard Rosenberg wrote Glory! Glory! is "lively, thoroughly arresting, always interesting, sometimes inspired TV that strengthens HBO's standing as the medium's bold provocateur. Whereas 1982’s 'Pray TV' on ABC was weak and soggy, 'Glory! Glory!' is energized by Steve Tyrell's music, Greene's bracing performance and the frequent sharp humor of Daniels' script."
