= Rachael Lily Rosenbloom (And Don't You Ever Forget It) =

- (And Don't You Ever Forget It)
- Original Playbill
- Music: Paul Jabara
- Lyrics: Paul Jabara
- Book: Paul Jabara; Tom Eyen
- Productions: 1973 Broadway never opened

Rachael Lily Rosenbloom (And Don't You Ever Forget It) is a musical with a book by Paul Jabara and Tom Eyen, and music and lyrics by Jabara (with some songs having additional lyrics by David Debin and Paul Issa).

The convoluted plot revolves around the misadventures of the title character (whose first name sports the extra "a" dropped by Barbra Streisand from her own) and her journey from a Brooklyn fish market to fame as a Hollywood gossip columnist, and then a career culminating in an Academy Award nomination and a nervous breakdown. The score is a mix of disco and more traditional Broadway show tunes.

Jabara had written the show specifically for Bette Midler, who passed on the project. Eyen was brought in to overhaul the book and replace original director Ron Link, and Grover Dale was hired to assist Tony Stevens with the choreography. Ellen Greene was cast as Rachael Lily Rosenbloom. Jabara himself played the lead male role of Joey; Anita Morris was the second female lead.

The Broadway production began previews on November 26, 1973. Within days, it was obvious to everyone involved that it was beyond repair. On December 1, a small notice in the local newspapers announced the show would be closing that night, prior to its official opening.

The demand for tickets was immediate. Theatre buffs who revel in the calamitous as much as the classical were determined to see what was destined to go down in the Broadway annals as one of the all-time biggest flops. When the curtain went up that night, the cast was facing a sold-out house. Frank Rich of the New York Times noted that the musical had a small hardcore group of fans who had followed its evolution from the beginning and already had seen it several times: "In scattered pockets throughout the otherwise shell-shocked house were claques of theatergoers who sang along with the musical numbers and gave mini-standing ovations at the end of most of them."

Producers Robert Stigwood and Ahmet Ertegün lost all of their $500,000 investment in the production. In addition to Ellen Greene in the title role, the cast included Jabara, Wayne Cilento, Anita Morris (who married assistant choreographer Grover Dale), Thommie Walsh, and André DeShields. The play was mentioned in passing in the liner notes of Paul Jabara's The Third Album.

In January 2017, Feinstein's/54 Below announced it would revive the musical, with the support of Jabara's family, for two concert stagings on March 13, 2017.

== Musical numbers ==
Playbill lists performer's name instead of character's name.

Act I

Scene 1: The 46th Annual Academy Awards Presentation

- "Academy Awards Theme" - Company

Scene 2: Brooklyn Garbage Cans

- "Dear Miss Streisand" - Ellen

Scene 3: Fulton Fish Market

- "Delivery Boys' Lament" - Richard, Kenneth, Andre, Thomas, Anthony
- "Me and My Perch" - Ellen, Richard, Kenneth, Andre, Thomas, Anthony

Scene 4: Rachael's Brooklyn Bedroom

- "Gorgeous Lily" - Ellen, Paul, Michon, Carole
- "Get Your Show Rolling" - Marion, Ellen, Andre, Anthony, Company

Scene 5: The Rachael Rosenbloom Radio Show

- "Hollywood! Hollywood!" - Marion, Ellen, Paul, Andre, Anthony

Scene 6: Traveling Cross Country

- "East Brooklyn Blues" - Ken, Richard, Ellen, Judy, Michon, Carole, Andre, Jozella, Company

Scene 7: Hollywood's Own Lolo Lounge

- "Broadway Rhythm" - Anita, Girls
- "Hollywood is Dying" - Boys
- "Broadway I Love You" - Anita

Scene 8: A Park Near Beverly Hills

- "Raymond's Song" - Paul, Ellen
- "Seduction Samba" - Marion, Andre, Anthony, Company
- "Rona, Mona and Me" - Paul, Carole, Jane

Scene 9: Stella's Bathroom

- "Working for Stella" - Anita, Ellen
- "Silver Diamond Rhinestone Glasses" - Ellen

Scene 10: Stella's Southern California Party

- "Party Sickness" - Company
- "Take Me Savage" - Anita, Judy, Jozella
- "Overdose" - Company
- "Get Your Show Rolling (Reprise)" - Marion, Ellen, Full Company

Act II

Scene 1: The 46th Annual Academy Awards Presentation

- "Academy Awards Theme" - Company

Scene 2: Rachael's Hollywood Bedroom

Scene 3: Barbra's Reception Room

Scene 4: Rachael's Hollywood Bedroom

- "Change in Raquel" - Ellen, Paul, Richard, Kenneth, Anthony, Andre
- "Raquel Gives the Dish" - Ellen, Anthony, Michon, Kenneth, Thomas, Andre, Richard
- "Gorgeous Lily (Reprise)" - Ellen, Paul

Scene 5: Ocho Rios

- "Ochos Rios" - Ellen, Andre, Anita, Paul, Thomas, Company

Scene 6: Sam Dago's Bar Scene 7: On Location in the Depths Of North Africa

- "Cobra Woman" - Ellen, Company

Scene 8: Sam Dago's Bar

- "Things" - Ellen, Kenneth, Thomas, Richard, Anthony
- "One Man" - Ellen, Anita, Marion, Girls

Scene 9: In the Gutter Outside Sam Dago's

Scene 10: Fulton Fish Market

Scene 11: In the Streets

- "We'll Be There" - Marion, Andre, Anthony, Jozella, Judy
- "One Man (Reprise)" - Anita, Marion

Scene 12: The Rachael Lily Rosenbloom Concert

- "Broadway Rhythm (Reprise)" - Full Company
- "We'll Be There (Reprise)" - Full Company
