= Live from Mount Olympus =

Podcast by PRX and Onassis

Publication
- Provider: Public Radio Exchange and Alexander S. Onassis Foundation

Related
- Website: www.onassis.org/initiatives/onassis-podcasts/live-from-mount-olympus

Live From Mount Olympus is a podcast distributed by Public Radio Exchange and produced by the Alexander S. Onassis Foundation and Brooklyn-based theater ensemble The TEAM. The show stars André De Shields as Hermes. The second season stars Joanne Hernandez as Persephone. Common Sense Media gave the show a five star rating for ages eight and up. The show was nominated for a Webby Award and won a Bullhorn Award in 2021.
