= De La Noche: The True Story – A Poperetta =

De La Noche: The True Story - A Poperetta

Studio album by Paul Jabara
- Released: 1986
- Recorded: 1986
- Genres: Pop, Soul, Disco
- Label: Warner Bros.
- Producer: Paul Jabara

Paul Jabara chronology
Paul Jabara & Friends (1983)	De La Noche: The True Story - A Poperetta (1986)	Greatest Hits... and Misses (1989)

De La Noche: The True Story – A Poperetta is the fifth and final studio album by American actor, singer and songwriter Paul Jabara. The concept/musical album, released on Warner Bros. Records in the United States in 1986, it features guest vocals by Leata Galloway who also appeared on Jabara's previous album Paul Jabara & Friends (1983).

== Background and release ==
Described as a "Latin/Salsa-influenced concept album from dance record musician Jabara", De La Noche tells the story of Mama De La Noche and her eight daughters, who are separated at birth and reunited years later. The singer faced difficulties securing a major-label to release the album, which took two years to be picked up by a record label due to executives continuing to associate him with the declining disco era.

According to Jabara, a portion of the album's proceeds would be donated to AIDS-related causes.

De La Noche: The True Story - A Poperetta remains unreleased on CD. (Note: According to Discogs, this album was released in compact format in 2019, under the label of Premium Series Gmbh in Europe.)

== Singles ==
The tracks "Ocho Rios" and "This Girl's Back in Town" were issued as singles. The single "Ocho Rios" was released as a 12" LP in February 1986, and peaked #42 at Billboard's 12 inch Singles Sales (Disco) chart. An accompaning long-form music video, running approximately nine-and-a-half minutes, was produced specifically for nightclub play. Warner Bros. promoted the video through a campaign involving more than 100 clubs across 25 U.S. markets. The music video generated controversy over perceived racial overtones and was reportedly under consideration by MTV.

== Track listing ==
Prologue/Intro (Side One)
No.	Title	Writer(s)	Length
1.	"De La Noche (Woman Of The Night) / Ocho Rios"	Bob Esty, Paul Jabara, Paul Issa
2.	"One From Your Heart"	David Wolfert, Paul Jabara	3:14
3.	"Deena's Dilemma/The Crime"	Harold Wheeler, Paul Jabara	3:21

Entracte (Side Two)
No.	Title	Writer(s)	Length
4.	"Entracte / De La Noche (Woman Of The Night) (Reprise) / The Search (Find Them!)"	Bob Esty, Paul Jabara, Harold Wheeler	6:06
5.	"This Girl's Back In Town"	Bob Esty, Paul Jabara	5:20
6.	"Finale: (Montage) Mama's Fever"	Paul Jabara and Company	4:32

== Credits ==
Credits adapted from the LP back cover (Warner Bros. Records, catalog no. 9 25381-1, 1-25381).

- Producer: Paul Jabara
- Executive-producer: Craig Kostich
- Illustration [Front/back Cover]: Jeremy Railton
