= Shut Out (song) =

- French vinyl picture sleeve

Single by Paul Jabara featuring special guest Donna Summer

from the album Shut Out
- B-side: "Hungry for Love"
- Released: 1977
- Genre: Disco
- Length: 3:10
- Label: Casablanca
- Songwriters: Paul Jabara, Bob Esty
- Producers: Arthur G. Wright, Mark Paul Simon

Donna Summer singles chronology
"I Feel Love" (1977)	"Shut Out" (1977)	"Down Deep Inside (Theme from "The Deep")" (1977)

Paul Jabara singles chronology
"Shut Out" (1977)	"Dance" (1977)

"Shut Out" is a single from the Paul Jabara album of the same name and features special guest vocals by Donna Summer. On the album, it is used as the first half of a medley another with another song called "Heaven Is a Disco".

Paul Jabara would later be responsible for writing two of Summer's biggest hits—"Last Dance" and the duet with Barbra Streisand, "No More Tears (Enough Is Enough)".

== Charts ==
Chart (1977)	Peak position
US Dance Club Songs (Billboard)	31
