= Organic Theater Company =

American theatre company

- Formation: 1969
- Type: Theatre group
- Location: Madison, Wisconsin, United States
- Artistic director: Stuart Gordon

Organic Theater Company was founded in 1969 in Madison, Wisconsin by artistic director Stuart Gordon and his wife Carolyn Purdy-Gordon.

== History ==
Its first play was a production of Richard III, but harassment from the local officials of Madison caused the production to be moved to three different venues before closing. In 1970, at the invitation of Paul Sills, Organic moved to Chicago. Sills helped the theater find a home in the Holy Covenant Church, where they produced original adaptations of George Orwell's Animal Farm and Homer's Odyssey. When Sills took his production of Story Theatre to Los Angeles that summer, he invited Organic to produce at his Body Politic Theater on Lincoln Avenue. The company ended up staying there over three years, where it produced Candide, which was invited by Joseph Papp to the Public Theater in New York. They also produced Poe by playwright Stephen Most; and Warp! by Stuart Gordon and Bury St. Edmund (a pseudonym for Lenny Kleinfeld), an original science-fiction epic adventure in three parts. Warp! was produced on Broadway at the Ambassador Theater in 1973.

Returning to Chicago, the company set up shop in the Uptown Center Hull House on Beacon Street. The new company included Joe Mantegna, Dennis Franz, and Meshach Taylor. Their first production there was The Wonderful Ice Cream Suit by Ray Bradbury. This was followed by Bloody Bess - A Tale of Piracy and Revenge by John Ostrander and William J. Norris. In 1974, they presented the world premiere of Sexual Perversity in Chicago by David Mamet. That same year they embarked on their first European tour, playing in Amsterdam, Brussels, and Hamburg.

Returning to Chicago, they produced a two-part adaptation of Mark Twain's Adventures of Huckleberry Finn. This production toured the United States and Europe. In the next few years Organic worked with Roald Dahl to present Switch Bitch, and also produced an adapation of Kurt Vonnegut Jr.'s The Sirens of Titan In 1976, they created Bleacher Bums, which toured throughout the United States and was presented at The American Place Theater. It was adapted for television and aired nationally on PBS in 1979. In 1985, with Stuart Gordon directing, Organic Theatre (in collaboration with Goodman Theatre) staged a shortened version of its earlier two-evening Huckleberry Finn in Chicago. The production was also recorded on stage for a WTTW-TV special. The cast included a young John Cameron Mitchell as Huck, Tom Towles as Pap, Meshach Taylor as Jim, Eric Berg as Tom Sawyer, and an ensemble consisting of Carolyn Purdy-Gordon, Roberta Custer, Peter Van Wagner, Michael Fosberg, and Richard Henzel.

In 1981, Organic renovated the Buckingham Theater on Clark Street, where it worked with author Mary Renault to adapt her book The King Must Die to the stage. This was followed by a musical adaptation of William Kotzwinkle's book Dr. Rat by June Shellene and Richard Fire; and the company's longest running show, E/R, conceived by Dr. Ronald Berman.

== Productions ==
Notable productions during founding artistic director Stuart Gordon's leadership included:

- Sexual Perversity in Chicago by David Mamet, world premiere production
- Cops by Terry Curtis Fox, starring Dennis Franz and Joe Mantegna
- Bleacher Bums, concept by Joe Mantegna (there was also a production for WTTW television that aired in 1979)
- E/R Emergency Room by Zaid Farid, Richard Fire, Stuart Gordon, Gary Houston, Carolyn Purdy-Gordon, Tom Towles, Bruce A. Young and Dr. Ronald Berman, who suggested the concept of the play. It later became a television series, E/R, in 1984, with Bruce A. Young and Shuko Akune reprising their roles from the Organic production.
- The Sirens of Titan (1977), adapted by Stuart Gordon from the 1959 novel by Kurt Vonnegut

After “E/R Emergency Room,” Stuart Gordon went to the west coast to make his cult classic sci-fi film "Re-Animator".

Artistic directors after Stuart Gordon included Thomas Riccio and Richard Fire. In 1996 Organic Theater Company and Touchstone Theatre merged under the leadership of Touchstone's artistic director Ina Marlowe. (For two years the organization did business as Organic Touchstone but is now known again as Organic Theater Company.)

Notable productions during artistic director Ina Marlowe's leadership included:

- The Steward of Christendom by Sebastian Barry, director Ina Marlowe worked closely with Irish playwright Sebastian Barry on this Midwest premiere
- An American Daughter by Wendy Wasserstein, director Ina Marlowe worked closely with playwright Wendy Wasserstein (including significant rewrites) on this Midwest premiere
- Belfry by Billy Roche, director Ina Marlowe worked closely with Irish playwright Billy Roche on this American premiere (of both the play and the playwright's work)
- The Last Seder by Jennifer Maisel, 2001 Kennedy Center Award for New Plays, World premiere
- The Lady from Dubuque by Edward Albee, director Ina Marlowe worked closely with Edward Albee on this Chicago premiere

Ina Marlowe passed the torch to artistic director Alexander Gelman at the beginning of 2006. Gelman's Organic Theater Company is now a company of actors touring with a rotating repertory. Since then the company has produced The $30,000 Bequest by Mark Twain, Bartleby, the Scrivener by Herman Melville, and Joseph Conrad's The Secret Agent. He also directed Eugène Ionesco's Man with Bags, Friedrich Durrenmatt's Play Strindberg, and Shimizu Kunio's The Dressing Room.

== Venues ==
Over the years, Organic Theater Company venues have included: The Holy Covenant United Methodist Church 925 W. Diversey Parkway, Chicago, The Body Politic Theater (later Victory Gardens Greenhouse Theater) 2257 N. Lincoln Avenue, Chicago, The Uptown Center Hull House 4520 N. Beacon Street, Chicago, The Buckingham Theater 3319 N. Clark Street, Chicago.

And: 2851 N. Halsted Street, Chicago Loyola University's Kathleen Mullady Theatre, Chicago, Ruth Page Theatre, LaCosta Theatre.
