= Paul Jabara & Friends =

Studio album by Paul Jabara
- Released: 1983
- Recorded: 1979-1983
- Genres: Pop, soul, disco
- Length: 34:15
- Label: CBS Records
- Producer: Paul Jabara

Paul Jabara chronology
| The Third Album (1979) | Paul Jabara & Friends (1983) | De La Noche: The True Story – A Poperetta (1986) |

Paul Jabara & Friends is the fourth studio album by American actor, singer and songwriter Paul Jabara, best known for writing Donna Summer's hit "Last Dance" and the Summer/Barbra Streisand duet "No More Tears (Enough Is Enough)". The album includes the multimillion-selling single release "It's Raining Men" by the Weather Girls, written and produced by Jabara in late 1982.

Paul Jabara & Friends was released in 1983 on the CBS Records label, with guest vocalists including the Weather Girls and Leata Galloway. It also features the vocals of singer Whitney Houston, who at the time of recording in 1979 was a teenager, 16 years old, and relatively unknown.

The tracks "It's Raining Men" and "Hope" were both included on the Weather Girls' 1983 debut album Success and the album also featured a song co-written by Diana Ross and Paul Jabara ("Ladies Hot Line").

== Critical reception ==
Professional ratings
Review scores
| Source | Rating |
|---|---|
| AllMusic | 1.5/5 stars |

Billboard highlighted the Weather Girls' "It's Raining Men" as the "tour de force" of the record, noting that Izora Armstead and Martha Wash "have tons of fun" on the tracks "Ladies Hot Line" and "Hope", and praising the "emerging talent" Whitney Houston for displaying "drama and emotion" on "Eternal Love". However, the review was critical of Jabara's own track, stating that "Bad Habits" is "clumsily camp and superficial". In a second review, the magazine also praised the album's structure, writing that Paul Jabara And Friends is "the first dance-oriented album in ages that does something with its own form". The review concluded that the album features "great wit and style", noting that the emotional momentum is "flawless" and that "It's Raining Men" sounds "even more climactic in the context" of the surrounding tracks.

Vince Ripol of AllMusic noted that the album "helped introduce a virtually unknown singer named Whitney Houston", praising her "refreshingly unaffected" rendition of "Eternal Love" while observing that "it is Houston's appearance which guarantees the album's significance as a musical footnote". He concluded that the record "is more of a hodgepodge than a comprehensive album" and "remains most interesting for fans of the 'friends' rather than the titular headliner".

== Track listing ==
Paul Jabara & Friends – Side one
| No. | Title | Writer(s) | Length |
|---|---|---|---|
| 1. | "Bad Habits" | Billy Fields; Tom Price | 3:15 |
| 2. | "Ladies Hot Line" | Diana Ross; Paul Jabara | 4:40 |
| 3. | "Hurricane Joe" | Greg Mathieson; Paul Jabara | 4:58 |
| 4. | "It's Raining Men" | Paul Jabara; Paul Shaffer | 5:27 |

Paul Jabara & Friends – Side two
| No. | Title | Writer(s) | Length |
|---|---|---|---|
| 1. | "Eternal Love" | Jay Asher; Paul Jabara | 6:29 |
| 2. | "What's Become of Love" | Jay Asher; Paul Jabara | 4:10 |
| 3. | "Hope" | Bob Esty; Paul Jabara | 5:16 |

== Notes ==
- "Eternal Love" was included in the set list during Whitney Houston's first headlining tour, The Greatest Love World Tour, in 1986.

== Personnel ==
- Buddy Williams (tracks 1, 2, 5, 7), Carlos Vega (track 4), Keith Forsey (track 3) - drums
- Marcus Miller (tracks 1, 2, 6) - Fender bass
- Lee Sklar (track 4), Les Hurdle (track 3), Neil Jason (tracks 5, 7) - bass
- Bob Esty (track 4), Greg Mathieson (track 3), Leon Pendarvis, Jr., Paul Shaffer (tracks 1, 2, 5, 7) - keyboards
- David Spinozza, George Waldenius (tracks 1, 2, 5, 7), Marty Walsh (track 3), Michael Landau (track 4) - guitar
- Bob Esty, Paul Delph (track 4), Paul Shaffer (tracks 3, 5, 7) - synthesizer
- Jerry Solomon - recording, mixing
- Charles Koppelman - executive producer
