= Warp! =

Stage play and spinoff comic book

- Promotional poster for Broadway, art by Neal Adams.
- Written by: Stuart Gordon; Lenny Kleinfeld (as Bury St. Edmund)
- Characters: David Carson/Lord Cumulus; Prince Chaos; Sargon; Lugulbanda; Symax
- Genre: Science fiction
- Setting: Earth; Fen-Ra

Premiere
- Date: February 14, 1973
- Place: Ambassador Theatre, New York City

Warp!, also spelled Warp, was a trilogy of American science fiction plays created by the Organic Theatre Company of Chicago, Illinois, in 1971 by co-authors Stuart Gordon and Lenny Kleinfeld, the latter under the pseudonym Bury St. Edmund. The three parts were My Battlefield My Body, Unleashed! Unchained! and To Die Alive!.

The play of Part I (My Battlefield My Body) moved to Broadway under the name Warp! for an unsuccessful short run in February 1973.

In 1979, the Organic Theatre Company mounted productions of all three plays, each part requiring separate admission, and each with its own Playbill program.

These plays were then performed in 1980 at the Mixed Blood Theater in Minneapolis, MN, where, on closing night all three parts were performed in succession, and props and other items from the play were offered for sale, including a few signed copies of the script.

The plays and their backstories became the basis for spinoff comic books and other media.

== Synopsis ==
David Carson, an everyday bank teller, learns that he is Lord Cumulus, "avenger of the universe". Suddenly transported from an annual employee-awards dinner to the mystical realm Fen-Ra, he finds himself battling for the destiny of the universe against antagonist Prince Chaos. In this world, he encounters the sage Lugulbanda, who sends him on his quest aided by the leather-clad Amazon warrior Sargon. They battle Valaria the insect sorceress and Chaos' henchman, the purple ape Symax.

== Production history ==
=== Original production ===
Chicago's Organic Theater Company opened the original play Warp! in 1971. Co-author Stuart Gordon in 2002 recalled its original inspiration: "It was three full-length plays that were inspired by Marvel Comics. ... Well, we weren't able to get the rights to any of the characters from Marvel, so we created our own. But I would say that Warp was very influenced by comic books like Dr. Strange and Thor". Billed by the company as "the world's first science fiction epic-adventure play in serial form", it was performed for over a year before moving to Broadway.

The Chicago cast included John Heard, André De Shields, Cecil O'Neal, J. Pat Miller, and Bruce A. Young. The costume designer was first-timer Cookie Gluck, a former art student at the University of Wisconsin who was married to actor O'Neal. The lighting designer was David K. H. Elliott.

The Chicago non-profit organization Videopolis videotaped the original production.

=== Move to Broadway ===
The production moved to New York City's Ambassador Theatre on Broadway, where part one of the trilogy, My Battlefield, My Body, ran seven previews beginning January 31, 1973, and eight performances from February 14–18, 1973. It marked the Broadway debut of John Heard, who played David Carson/Lord Cumulus. Other cast-members included Tom Towles as Prince Chaos, and Keith Szarabajka as the young David.

The Broadway production was produced by Anthony D'Amato in association with the Organic Theatre Company, and directed by co-writer Stuart Gordon. Comic-book and commercial artist Neal Adams was art director, with scenic design by Robert Guerra, costume design by Laura Crow and Cookie Gluck; lighting design by Jane Reisman and Neil Peter Jampolis; and visuals by Khamphalous Lightshow. William J. Norris and Richard Fire provided incidental music, with the latter also providing vocal sound effects. Frank Marino and Lynne Guerra were stage managers.

==== Broadway cast ====
The opening-night cast:

- André De Shields ... Desi Arnez
- Cordis Fejer ... Penny Smart; Sargon
- Jane Fire ... Sheila Fantastik
- Richard Fire ... Mrs. O'Grady; psychiatric director; bank teller; Lugulbanda; Yggthion
- Carolyn Gordon ... Mary Louise; Valaria
- John Heard ... David Carson; Lord Cumulus
- William J. Norris ... Bank president; Dr. Victor Vivian; Symax
- Keith Szarabajka ... Attendant; young David Carson
- Tom Towles ... Janitor; Prince Chaos

== Critical reception ==
Clive Barnes of The New York Times said in terms of fidelity comics: "The look of the show is extremely accurate. The costumes — minimal and exotic — the outlandish props and the serviceably suggestive permanent setting are all perfectly in accord. The language is heightened melodrama having the same fleeting relationship to literature that bubble gum has to food". Although he criticized the show having no story but only action, he admired the acting. He allowed that "for comic-book addicts ... Warp might well be a lot of fun. Others are warned that, while it is undeniably cleverly done, it is at heart a one-joke evening".

== Awards ==
Spin-off comic book Warp #1 (March 1983), depicting the play's characters Lord Cumulus (foreground) and Prince Chaos. Cover art by Frank Brunner.

- Laura Crow, Cookie Gluck: 1973 Drama Desk Award for Most Promising Costume Design
- David K.H. Elliott, lighting designer: 1979 Joseph Jefferson Award for the Organic Theater's Warp
- Lee A. Ditkowsky, Special Effects. 1979 Joseph Jefferson award for Organic Theater's Warp

== In other media ==
The alternative comics company First Comics published the spin-off comic-book series Warp, which ran 19 issues cover-dated March 1983 to February 1985, and 3 specials.

The premiere issue featured a 20-page Lord Cumulus story by writer Peter B. Gillis, penciler and cover artist Frank Brunner, and inker Bob Smith; and an eight-page story starring Sargon, Mistress of War, by writer John Ostrander, penciler Lenin Delsol, and inker Joe Staton. Brunner would continue as penciler through issue #9, after which he was succeeded by Jerry Bingham except for two issues, #16 (penciled by Bill Willingham) and #19 (penciled and inked by Mike Gustovich, the regular inker for most of the series' run). The backup features rotated among "Sargon, Mistress of War" by Ostrander, Delsol and Staton; "The Faceless Ones", by writer Jack C. Harris and artist Steve Ditko; "Valaria, Insect Sorceress", by writer Gillis, penciler Willingham, and inker Bruce Patterson; and "Outrider", by Gillis and various artists.

First Comics additionally published Warp Special #1-3 (July 1983, January and June 1984), by writer Gillis and pencilers Howard Chaykin, Marc Silvestri, and George Freeman, respectively.

Previous to these, the Organic Theater Company and Mike Gold Media Services published a one-shot, 16-page promotional-giveaway comic book, Weird Organic Tales #1 (1981), that included scenes from several of the theater company's works, including Warp!.

== Influence ==
In a 2007 history of Chicago's Victory Gardens Greenhouse Theater, the Chicago Reader said the "science-fantasy trilogy Warp! anticipated the Star Wars phenom by several years" (six to be precise).
