= Jose F. Valencia =

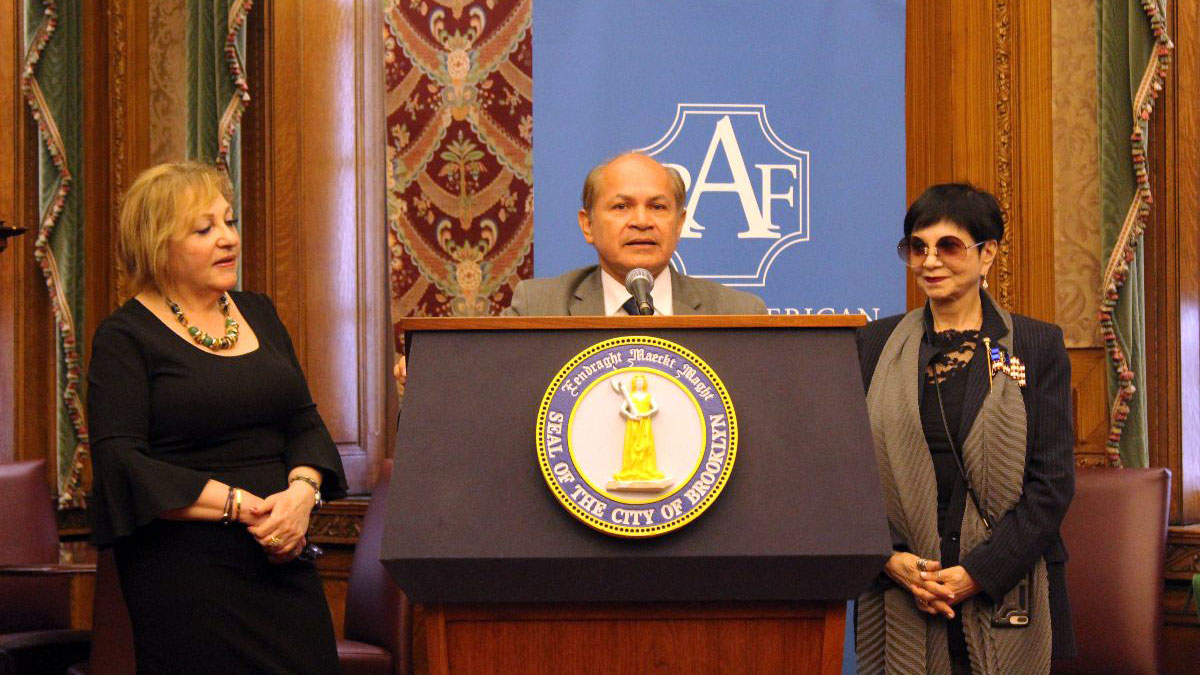
- Jose Valencia was honored on Thursday, June 20, 2019 by Brooklyn Borough President Eric Adams and the Russian American Foundation.

2nd President of ASA College
- In office March 2019 – 2021
- Preceded by: Alex Shchegol

Personal details
- Education: Baruch College

Jose Valencia (born December 2, year unknown) was the President of ASA College with locations in Brooklyn, Manhattan, and Hialeah, FL. He began his presidential tenure in August 2018 as co-president and was named sole President in March 2019. Under his leadership, ASA College rejoined the national organization, Career Education Colleges and Universities (CECU). He had previously served as ASA's Comptroller from 2009 to 2012, and as CFO from 2012 to 2018, during the college's accreditation by the Middle States Commission on Higher Education. That accreditation was removed in 2023 as the college failed to meet several of the commission's standards. Prior to his work with ASA, he had been appointed CEO of the New York Association for New Americans in 2004 when the organization reshaped itself as the number of refugees from the former Soviet Union declined.

On June 20, 2019, he was the recipient of an honorary citation from the Russian American Foundation and the Office of the Brooklyn Borough President for his lifelong contributions to the improvement of Russian-speaking communities via his work with NYANA and the many students of Russian descent who have attended ASA College.

== Early life ==
Valencia was born in Guayaquil, Ecuador. He is the fifth child of parents Luis and Lucrecia Valencia's nine children. He immigrated to NYC in the mid-1970s. After earning a BA at Baruch College, he began at the New York City Comptroller's Office as a Staff Accountant, became a Certified Public Accountant (CPA), and eventually became a Bureau Chief.

== Career ==
=== NYANA ===
In 1990, Jose joined the New York Association of New Americans (NYANA), an $80 million a year nonprofit organization which at the time was the largest Jewish refugee resettlement agency in the country, as its Controller and Chief Fiscal Officer. In this capacity, he was responsible for overseeing all financing activities, including maintaining the general ledger, and preparing financial statements. In February 1994, he was appointed Chief Financial Officer. In January 2000, Jose was appointed NYANA's Senior Vice President and Chief Operating Officer overseeing the financial, administrative and client service operations.

In August 2004, Jose was appointed president and CEO. Under his leadership, NYANA began providing services to non-Jewish immigrant communities and expanded its range of services. All told, in his 17 years at NYANA, Jose made history being the first non-Jewish President of this Jewish organization and played a key role in an organization that resettled hundreds of thousands of Jewish refugees and immigrants from other countries. A great majority of those who benefited from NYANA's services came from the former Soviet Union and therefore spoke Russian. Such was Jose's positive and lasting impact on the Russian-speaking community that on June 20, 2019, the Russian American Foundation and the Office of the Brooklyn Borough President awarded him with a proclamation for his lifelong contributions to the improvement of Russian-speaking communities.

=== VIP Community Services ===
After NYANA, Jose worked as the Vice President for Finance and Administration/Chief Financial Officer for VIP Community Services, Inc., a non-profit organization that provides an array of services in the Bronx. Prior to Jose coming to VIP, the organization had a perennial $1 million a year deficit. Through strategic staff reduction, Jose was able to eliminate the deficit entirely. In fact, during Fiscal Year 2009, Jose's last year at VIP, the organization had a surplus of over $100,000.

=== ASA College ===
In 2009, Jose was recruited by ASA College, a two-year degree-granting institution, to develop a budget, establish sound financial controls, and train its finance staff. This was required as part of the Middle States accreditation process. In March 2010, the evaluation visit took place and ASA was awarded a five-year initial accreditation, with reaccreditation affirmed in 2015. The review cited ASA's financial function as one of the reasons why ASA was awarded the five-year accreditation. In July 2018, Jose was named co-president of ASA. In March 2019, the Board of Trustees named him the sole President of the college.

Since 2018, Jose has served as an evaluator for the Middle States Commission on Higher Education (MSCHE). He is a member of the 2020-21 Board of Directors for the Florida Association of Post Secondary Schools and Colleges (FAPSC).

== See also ==
- New York Association for New Americans
- Ecuadorian Americans
- ASA College

Academic offices
| Preceded by Alex Shchegol | 2nd President of ASA College; 2019 - 2021 | Succeeded by Incumbent |
