= Robert Guerra (art director) =

American art director

Robert Guerra is an American art director of film and theatre. He has designed sets for plays such as Warp! at New York City's Ambassador Theatre on Broadway (1973) and has worked on films such as Ironweed (1987), See You in the Morning (1989), Family Business (1989), The Last of the Mohicans (1992), The Pelican Brief (1993), The Portrait (1993), The Devil's Own (1997), Meet Joe Black (1998), A Beautiful Mind (2001), Cold Mountain (2003), The Aviator (2004), and Shutter Island (2010).
