= Thomas P. Riccio =

American multimedia artist and academic (born 1955)

Thomas Riccio, India 2013

Thomas P. Riccio (born 1955) is an American multimedia artist and academic. He received his BA from Cleveland State University in English Literature in 1978, his MFA from Boston University in 1982, and studied in the PhD program in Performance Studies at New York University from 1983 to 1984. Riccio has directed over one hundred plays at American regional theatres, off-off and off Broadway and has worked extensively in the area of indigenous and ritual performance conducting research and/or creating performances in: South Africa, Zambia, Burkina Faso, Tanzania, Kenya, Ethiopia, Europe, Russia, Siberia, Korea, India, Nepal, China, and Alaska. In 1993 the People's Republic of Sakha (central Siberia) declared him a “Cultural Hero”. Performance ethnography project with the Miao people of SW Hunan, China, 2015-2019.

== Career ==
In 1980 Riccio was appointed Assistant Literary Director at the American Repertory Theatre, Cambridge, MA and Research Assistant to Robert Brustein. In 1984 he was appointed Dramaturg and Resident Director of the Cleveland Play House. 1985 he served as Artistic Director of the Organic Theatre, Chicago. In 1988 Riccio was appointed as Professor of Theatre at the University of Alaska Fairbanks and Artistic Director of Tuma Theater, an Inuit theatre group. He continued in both of positions until 2003. From 2003-2024 Professor of Visual and Performing Arts, now Emeritus, at the University of Texas at Dallas. Since 2006 Riccio has worked with David Hanson at Hanson Robotics as a Lead Narrative Engineer (2005-2009) and was Creative Director 2017-2019. He has also served as a visiting professor at the Korean National University for the Arts, California Institute of Integral Studies, and the University of Dar es Salaam. He is a producing artist with Project X, a Dallas-based performance collective . He has created two media installations The Invention of Memory (2010) and Not So Indifferent (2012) both at Central Trak Gallery, Dallas. In 2011 with Lori McCarty he formed Dead White Zombies, a Dallas-based experimental, post-disciplinary performance and media group that utilizes ritual and indigenous expressions. Riccio serves as Poo Pa Doo (artistic director) of the group and has written, directed, and created installations for eight works since its founding. Blah Blah (2011); Flesh World (2012), (w)hole (2012), and T.N.B. (2013), Bull Game (2013), , Karaoke Motel (2014) , DP92 (2015) , and Holy Bone (2017) He was a Fulbright Specialist and an artist in residence at the Watermill Arts Center (2016) and is collaborating on 12 Shouts, a performance project with Sibyl Kempson for the Whitney Museum. Visiting Professor in Ethnography and Anthropology, Jisou University, Hunan, China. Principal actor, Wedding Dresses.

== Notable works ==
- 2003: Published the book Reinventing Traditional Alaska Native Performance
- 2004: Initiated the "Story Lab" and Artistic Director
- 2004: Kartasi, a new media performance work
- 2004: "Kenya's Community Health Awareness Puppeteers" article published by PAJ, Performing Arts Journal, #76
- 2006: Alpha Male, a cyberpunk paranoia new media performance work
- 2006: There is Never a Reference Point, a performance work about a person with multiple personality disorder
- 2006: Inuit, a play awarded the Alexander S. Onassis Foundation Distinction Prize in Playwrighting
- 2007: Participated in the creation of Einstein, a lifelike conversational robot, which was on display at the Cooper-Hewitt Design Museum NYC (12/2006 to 05/2007)
- 2007: Published the book Performing Africa: Remixing Culture, Theatre and Tradition
- 2008: The Cabinet of Dr. Caligari, a performance/media immersion inspired by the 1920 Expressionist film
- 2008: So There and Orange Oranges, two short plays for the theatre, Festival of Independent Theaters, Dallas
- 2009: Some People a theatre/media performance work, Out of the Loop Festival and Project X, Dallas
- 2009: Andgena (The First), a devised performance work, Lul Theatre and Litooma, Addis Ababa, Ethiopia, also conducted workshops at Addis Ababa University.
- 2009: Orange Oranges play published by Sojourn Literary Journal
- 2009: Video Documentary Director and Editor, There is Never a Reference Point premiere Dallas Video Festival
- 2009-2010: Featured Performance Artist, "All the World's a Stage," Dallas Museum of Art
- 2010: Published Articles "Robot as Ritual Oracle and Fetish," University of Tartu (Estonia), "Performance of Body, Space and Place" chapter in Healing Collective Trauma, Springer Publishing
- 2010: Participated in the creation of Bina, a conversational robot for Hanson Robotics
- 2010: PlayLab reading of new play TNB (Typical Nigga Behavior) Great Plains Theatre Conference and Workshop Instructor
- 2011 Blah Blah, writer, director, installations, Dead White Zombies, Dallas. Semi-Finalist, National Playwright's Conference
- 2012 Flesh World writer, director, installations, Dead White Zombies, Dallas. Semi-finalist, National Playwright's Conference
- 2012 (w)hole writer, director, installations, Dead White Zombies, Dallas
- 2012 Ethiopia and Its Double article published by Theatre Forum Magazine
- 2012 Rhythm Reality published, a chapter In Rhythms And Steps Of Africa, Studies on Comparative Aesthetics, volume 2: Studies On Anthropology And Aesthetics Of The African Dance, editor Wiesna Mond-Kozłowska.
- 2012 Shadows in the Sun: Context, Process and Performance in Ethiopia, published, New Theatre Quarterly, Cambridge Univ. Press
- 2012 At Play With the Dead White Zombies, an interview published in Arts and Culture, Dallas, December 2012-January 2013.
- 2013 Collective (Re)Creation as Site of Reclamation, Reaffirmation, and Redefinition, chapter in Collective Creation in Contemporary Performance, Palgrave
- 2013 Lecture Series at Tribruvan University, Nepal. Performance workshop with Mandala Theatre, Kathmandu. Article, Kathmandu Post.
- 2013 Performance Workshops, Pondicherry University, India. Research in Theru Koothu, Tamil folk performance.
- 2013 T.N.B. a site-specific performance immersion, writer-director
- 2013 The Weirdest Theatre Mind in Dallas, published in Dallas Observer, August 2013
- 2014 100 Dallas Creatives: Offbeat Intellect Thomas Riccio article published in The Dallas Observer, September, 2014
- 2014 Artist Residency, Halka Center, Istanbul, Turkey
- 2014 "Dead White Zombies, Dallas Texas" published in Theatre Forum, International Journal
- 2015 Lecture Series at Jishou University, China, research in Miao traditional performance , named visiting professor in Anthropology and Ethnography
- 2016 "Narrative of Place" chapter published in Audience Revolutions, TCG Press, Caridad Svich, editor
- 2016 Watermill Center, NY, Artist-in-Residence, February–March
- 2016 Huan Nuo Yuan, a video documentary of a Miao ritual, shown at Dallas Video Festival, EthnograFilm Festival (Paris), Beijing Film Festival, International Film Festival of Ethnographic Films, Sophia, Bulgaria, and Martinique Film Festival.
- 2017 Holy Bone, a site specific immersion performance, writer-director, Dead White Zombies
- 2017 Thomas Riccio Dead White Zombies an podcast interview, by Brett Cowell, Total Life Complete Fall 2017
- 2017 Dead White Zombies Theatre Like You Never Seen It feature article published in D Magazine, February 2017
- 2018 Africa Agency and the Anthropocene article published in Anthenaeum Review
- 2019 Nuoyuan Exorcism and Transformation in Miao Ritual Drama article published in TDR, The Drama Review, MIT Press Summer 2019
- 2021 About Face video short produced by Dead White Zombies and KERA TV, Dallas, October 25 broadcast
- 2021 Please, Mr. Judge Man article published in Anthenaeum Review , Spring 2021
- 2021 Sophia Robot: An Emergent Ethnography article published in TDR, Fall 2021
- 2022 Zhuiniu Water Buffalo Ritual of the Miao Cultural Narrative Performed article published in Religion and Fok Belief in Chinese Literature and Theatre Spring 2022
- 2023 Form Fatigue article published in Anthenaeum Review, Spring 2023
- 2024 Deus Ex Machina Sophia Robot Techno Deity article published in Ecumenica Performance Journal, Spring 2024
- 2024 Sophia Robot Post Human Being book published by Routledge Press, June 2024
- 2024 Dragon Eye 10 channel video installation, SP/N Gallery, Dallas, January-March 2024
