= Ellen Greene =

American actress and singer (born 1951)

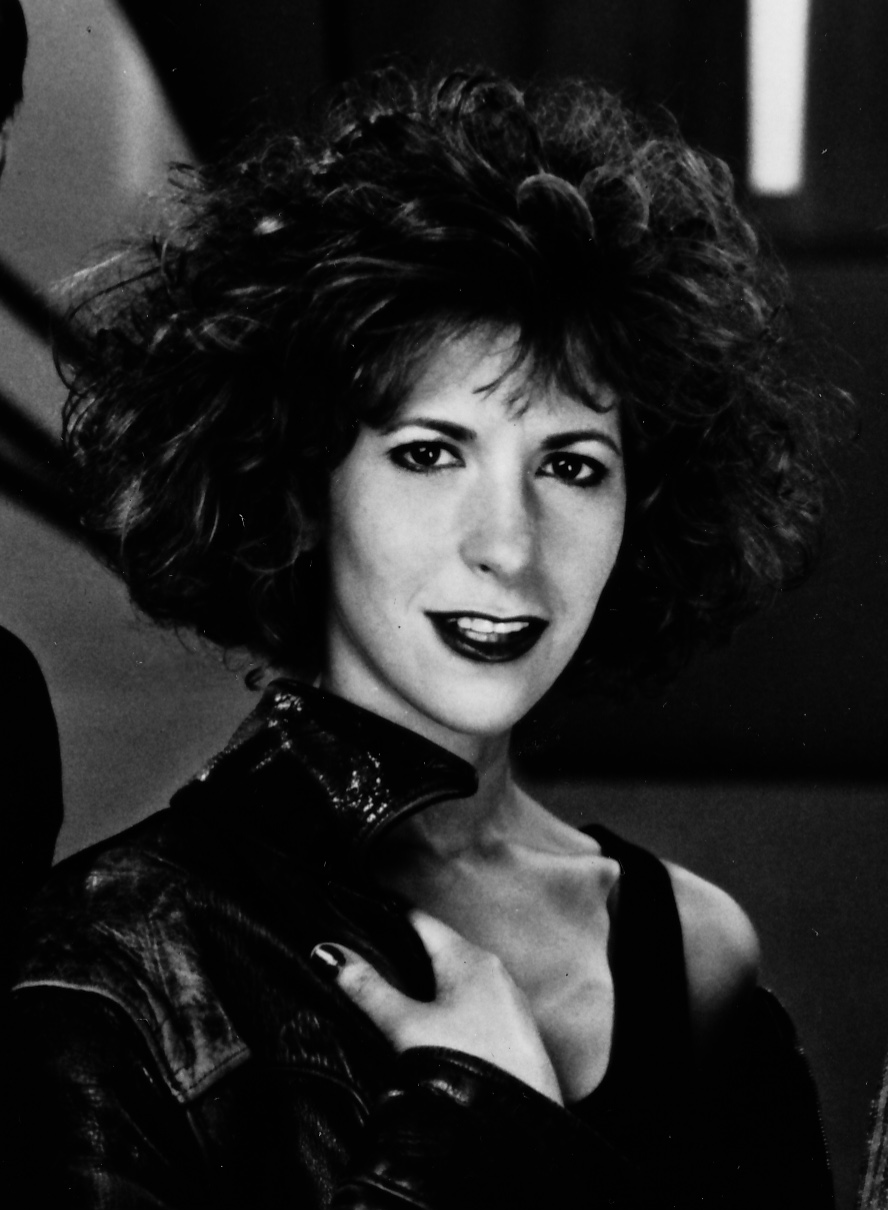
- Greene in Glory! Glory! (1989)
- Born: February 22, 1951 (age 75); New York City, U.S.
- Occupations: Actress; singer
- Years active: 1973–present
- Spouses: Tibor Hardik (m. 1990; div. 1997) Christian Klikovits (m. 2003; div. 2007)

Ellen Greene (born February 22, 1951) is an American actress and singer. She has had a long and varied career as a singer, particularly in cabaret, as an actress and singer in numerous stage productions, particularly musical theatre, as well as having performed in many films and television series. Her best-known roles are as Audrey in the original stage musical and film adaptation of Little Shop of Horrors, and as Vivian Charles in the ABC television series Pushing Daisies.

== Personal life ==
Greene was born in Brooklyn, New York. Her mother was a guidance counselor, and her father was a dentist. She attended W. Tresper Clarke High School in Westbury, New York. She spent summers at Cejwin Camps in Port Jervis, New York, where she performed in musical theatre productions. Her first marriage was to Tibor Hardik, and she married Christian Klikovits on September 25, 2003; both marriages ended in divorce.

== Early career ==
She first starred on Broadway in the title role of Rachael Lily Rosenbloom (And Don't You Ever Forget It), which had 7 previews in 1973 and closed before officially opening. She then played Chrissy in Joseph Papp's production of In the Boom Boom Room off-Broadway at the Public Theatre in November and December 1974. In Next Stop, Greenwich Village (1976), She played Sarah, her first starring role in a film.

Continuing her work with Papp's New York Shakespeare Festival, Greene next played the role of Jenny in The Threepenny Opera (1976) at the Vivian Beaumont Theater in Lincoln Center, for which she was nominated for the 1977 Tony Award for Best Featured Actress in a Musical. She continued to appear in other productions with the New York Shakespeare Festival and elsewhere, such as the part of Suzanne/The Little Rose in The Little Prince and the Aviator (1981). At the WPA Theater, she met Howard Ashman and Alan Menken. Their friendship led to her playing the role of Audrey from 1982 in the long-running off-Broadway premiere of Little Shop of Horrors, which she reprised in the 1986 film version opposite Rick Moranis. Greene returned to Broadway as Mabel in a revival of Three Men on a Horse (1993).

She has worked in films such as I'm Dancing as Fast as I Can (1982), Talk Radio (1987), and Pump Up the Volume (1990). Greene was the voice of Goldie in the Don Bluth film Rock-a-Doodle (1991).

== Later career ==
Greene released an album in 2004 entitled In His Eyes, on which she was accompanied by her husband and musical director, Christian Klikovits. Other work includes the role of Vivian Charles on the television series Pushing Daisies (2007)

In July and August 2009, Greene starred as Miss Adelaide in a concert version of the musical Guys and Dolls, which had a 3-day engagement at the Hollywood Bowl in Los Angeles, California. In 2011, she appeared in five episodes on the soap opera The Young and the Restless as Primrose DeVille. She appeared in the musical Betwixt! at the Trafalgar Studios in London's West End from July 26 to August 20, 2011.

Greene appeared in two episodes of the ABC Family show Bunheads (2012). She portrayed Doctor Gale Macones in The Walking Dead Webisodes: The Oath. In 2015, Greene again played Audrey in Little Shop of Horrors at New York City Center in the Encores! Off-Center Series staged concert.

Greene performed in the 2016 Democratic National Convention's "Fight Song" video.

== Filmography ==
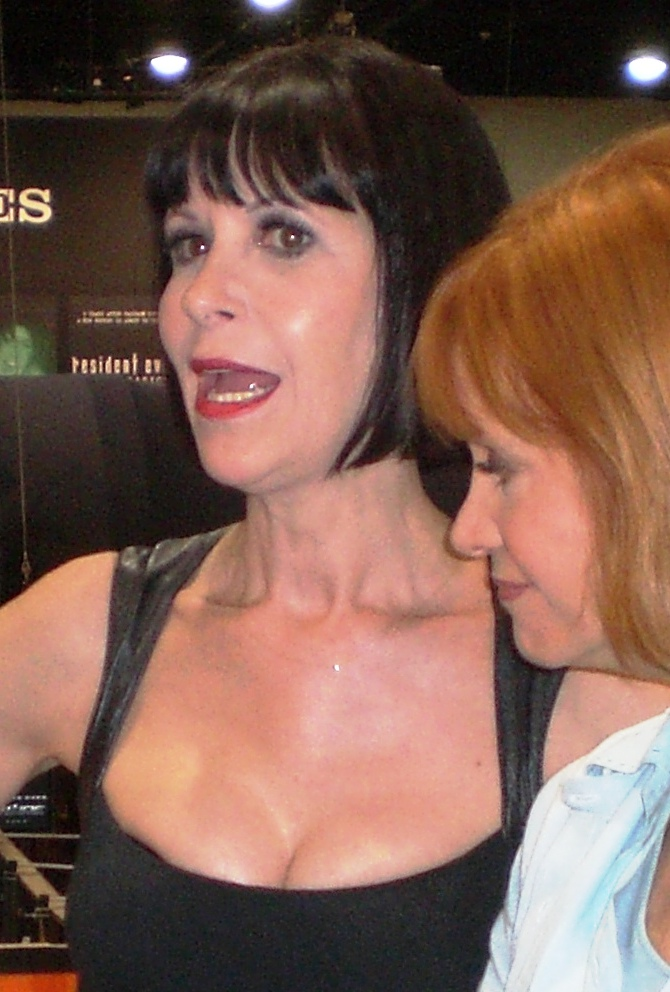
Greene (left) with fellow Pushing Daisies star Swoosie Kurtz in July 2008

=== Film ===
| Year | Title | Role | Notes |
|---|---|---|---|
| 1976 | Next Stop, Greenwich Village | Sarah Roth | |
| 1982 | I'm Dancing as Fast as I Can | Karen Mulligan | |
| 1986 | Little Shop of Horrors | Audrey | |
| 1988 | Me and Him | Annette Uttanzi | |
| 1988 | Talk Radio | Ellen | |
| 1990 | Pump Up the Volume | Jan Emerson | |
| 1991 | Rock-a-Doodle | Goldie (voice) | |
| 1991 | Stepping Out | Maxine | |
| 1992 | Fathers & Sons | Judy | |
| 1994 | Naked Gun 33 1/3: The Final Insult | Louise | |
| 1994 | Wagons East | Belle | |
| 1994 | Léon: The Professional | Margie Lando, Mathilda's mother | |
| 1995 | Killer: A Journal of Murder | Elizabeth Wyatt | |
| 1996 | An Occasional Hell | Della | |
| 1996 | One Fine Day | Elaine Lieberman | |
| 1997 | States of Control | Carol | |
| 1998 | Jaded | Louise Smith | |
| 2001 | Alex in Wonder | Clarice | |
| 2003 | The Cooler | Doris | |
| 2003 | Love Object | Typing Supervisor | |
| 2010 | Privileged | Mrs. Rothman | Video |
| 2016 | Muddy Corman | Dawn Denford | |
| 2017 | Love's Last Resort | Ms. Leigh | |
| 2019 | The Untold Story | Lydia | |
| 2026 | California Scenario | Renee | |

=== Television ===
| Year | Title | Role | Notes |
|---|---|---|---|
| 1977 | Seventh Avenue | Paula Class | TV miniseries |
| 1978 | The Rock Rainbow | Jess | Television film |
| 1983 | The Magic of Herself the Elf | Creeping Ivy (voice) | Television film |
| 1985 | Miami Vice | Darlene | Episode: "Made for Each Other" |
| 1987 | Morning Maggie | Maggie McAllister | Television film |
| 1988 | Superman 50th Anniversary | Ariel Dickenson | Television film; documentary |
| 1989 | Glory! Glory! | Ruth | Television film |
| 1989 | CBS Summer Playhouse | Sally Maggio | Episode: "Road Show" |
| 1989 | Dinner at Eight | Kitty Packard | Television film |
| 1994 | The Adventures of Pete & Pete | Abilene Jones | Episode: "Time Tunnel" |
| 1995 | Cybill | Sharon | 2 episodes |
| 1995 | Law & Order | Karen Gaines | Episode: "Bitter Fruit" |
| 1997 | Dellaventura | Elizabeth Brodkin | Episode: "Above Reproach" |
| 2000 | Suddenly Susan | Harriet Graham | Episode: "The Break Up" |
| 2002 | The X-Files | Vicki Louise Burdick | Episode: "Improbable" |
| 2002 | Crossing Jordan | Mrs. Dunham | Episode: "Secrets & Lies: Part 2" |
| 2005 | Mystery Woman: Sing Me a Murder | Carly | Television film |
| 2005 | Fielder's Choice | Jill | Television film |
| 2006 | Re-Animated | Dolly Gopher (voice) | Television film |
| 2007–2008 | Out of Jimmy's Head | Dolly Gopher (voice) | Main role |
| 2007–2009 | Pushing Daisies | Vivian Charles | Main role |
| 2007–2009 | Heroes | Virginia Grey | 3 episodes |
| 2009 | Batman: The Brave and the Bold | Mrs. Manface (voice) | Episode: "Night of the Huntress!" |
| 2011 | The Young and the Restless | Primrose DeVille | Recurring role |
| 2012 | Pound Puppies | Gertrude Washburn (voice) | Episode: "Olaf in Love" |
| 2012 | Bunheads | Wiccan Friend | 2 episodes |
| 2013 | Hannibal | Mrs. Komeda | Episode: "Sorbet" |
| 2013 | The Walking Dead: The Oath | Gale | 2 episodes |
| 2017 | Tangled: The Series | Mrs. Sugarby (voice) | Episode: "Painter's Block" |
| 2025 | Long Story Short | Vivian (voice) | Episode: "Uncle Barry" |

== Stage ==
Sources: Internet Off-Broadway Database; Playbill Vault

- Rachael Lily Rosenbloom (And Don't You Ever Forget It) (1973) (never officially opened)
- In the Boom Boom Room (1974) (Off-Broadway)
- The Threepenny Opera (1976) (Broadway)
- The Threepenny Opera (1977) (Delacorte Theater) (return engagement)
- Funny Face (1978) (Studio Arena Theater)
- Teeth 'n' Smiles (1979) (Off-Broadway)
- Wake Up, It's Time to Go to Bed (1979) (Off-Broadway) by Carson Kievman
- They're Playing Our Song (1979) (US national tour)
- The Little Prince and the Aviator (1982) (never officially opened)
- Little Shop of Horrors (1982) (Off-Off Broadway showcase, Off-Broadway and London)
- Starting Monday (1990) (Off-Broadway)
- Weird Romance (1992) (Off-Broadway)
- Three Men on a Horse (1993) (Broadway)
- Oliver! (1997) (North Shore Music Theatre)
- The First Picture Show (1999) (San Francisco)
- A Broadway Diva Christmas (2005) (Women's Project)
- Guys and Dolls (2009) (Hollywood Bowl concert)
- Betwixt! (2011) (London)
- Little Shop of Horrors (2015) (Encores! Off-Center)

== Awards and nominations ==
| Year | Award | Category | Nominated Work | Result |
|---|---|---|---|---|
| 1977 | Tony Award | Best Performance by a Featured Actress in a Musical | The Threepenny Opera | Nominated |
| 1983 | Drama Desk Award | Outstanding Actress in a Musical | Little Shop of Horrors | Nominated |
| 1983 | Laurence Olivier Award | Best Actress in a Musical | Little Shop of Horrors | Nominated |
