= Pattie Brooks =

American singer (born 1943)

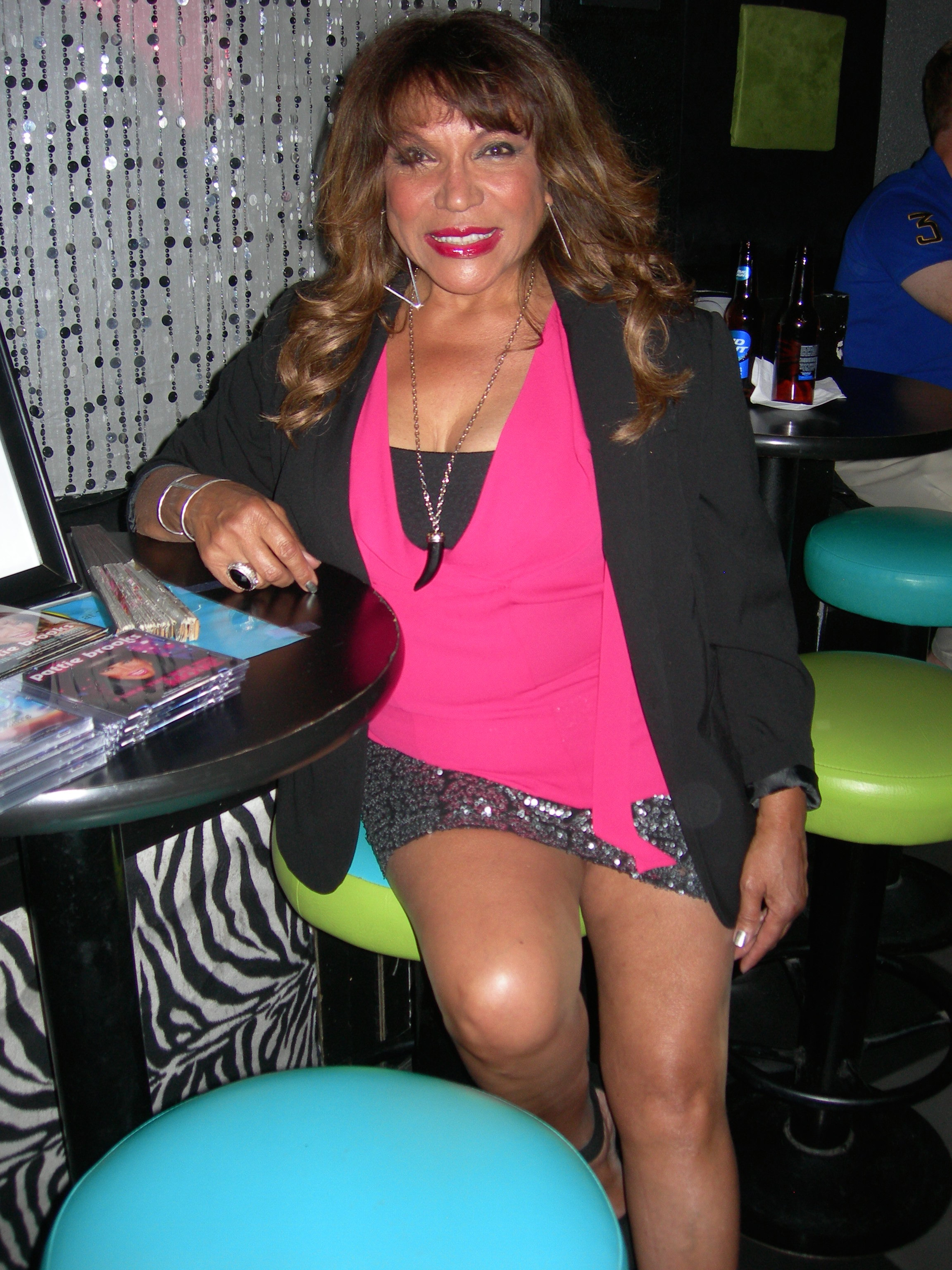
- Brooks in 2014

Background information
- Also known as: Patti Brooks, Patty Brooks
- Born: March 17, 1943 (age 83); Fort Riley, Kansas, US
- Genres: Disco, pop, R&B, jazz, soul
- Occupations: singer, song writer, actress
- Years active: 1968–present
- Labels: Casablanca, Mirage Records, Nu And Improved Records

Pattie Brooks (sometimes credited as Patti Brooks and Patty Brooks) is an American singer most frequently associated with the disco dance era of the 1970s.

She was born in Fort Riley, Kansas to a military family. Her first break came in 1968 when she auditioned for the chorus on The Smothers Brothers Comedy Hour. In the next decade she became a sought-after backing singer, appearing on the Bobby Darin Show and touring with, among others Helen Reddy. She sang backing vocals on Donna Summer's album I Remember Yesterday.

== Casablanca Records career ==
In the mid-1970s Brooks came to the attention of disco producer Simon Soussain, and her solo recording career was born. Her first of four albums on the Casablanca label was 1977's Love Shook (credited as Pattie Brooks & The Simon Orchestra), the album peaked at #2 on the US Dance Chart. Brooks remained with Soussain and in 1978 recorded her biggest club hit, "After Dark". It was selected to be part of the soundtrack to the film Thank God It's Friday, which topped the club play chart (number one for six weeks).

"After Dark" was the mainstay of Brooks's second album, Our Ms. Brooks. The album also included the hit "This Is The House Where Love Died" and reached #22 on the US Dance Chart.

In 1979 Brooks moved away from Soussain with her third album, Party Girl, produced by Bunny Sigler of Instant Funk and Salsoul fame. This album included a wider range of sounds – funk, pop, disco and ballads. While the album contained no major hits it did include "Got Tu Go Disco", the title song from the short-lived Broadway musical. The 12" single peaked at number 67 on the US Dance Chart. In 1979 Brooks branched out from disco by singing "Close Enough For Love", the title song to the Vanessa Redgrave movie Agatha. By 1980, when a disco backlash had hit the industry in the US, Brooks's fourth and last Casablanca offering, Pattie Brooks, was more of a pop-soul affair, produced this time by Michael Lovesmith. No hits were forthcoming, and Brooks left Casablanca.

== Post-disco activity ==
She returned in 1982 on the Mirage label with a fifth album, In My World, produced by Sandy Linzer. The album reflected the popular styles of the time. It produced a moderate club hit with the trendy dance-rock tinged, high pressure beat "Dr. Ruth". The song was an ode to sexologist and radio talk show host Dr. Ruth Westheimer. It also had a minor R&B hit with the ballad "Every Time I Turn Around".

The album was remastered and released as a compact disc on the Funky Town Grooves label in 2009. This turned out to be Brooks's last album, although she remained active in terms of one-off singles.

In 1983 she was signed by Backstreet Records, releasing the minor club hit "Get It On And Have A Party". She was featured prominently on the soundtrack to the film Doctor Detroit, including two duets with its star Dan Aykroyd. In 1985 Brooks released "Lifeline Dancing" on the Easy Street label, which was featured in the Emilio Estevez movie That Was Then... This Is Now. In 1987 she surfaced on West Holly Records with "All Talk", and in 1988 on Waterwheel Records with the maxi-single "Function at the Junction". Following these one-off releases, Brooks returned to backup vocalist sessions and the occasional advertising jingle (most notably 1985's "Nature Valley Granola's Dandy Bar").

=== Recent activity ===
In 1993, producer Rick Gianatos remade Brooks's greatest hit, "After Dark." It was released on a vinyl 12" single b/w "Sweet Temptation." In 2006 Gianatos issued a CD single of "After Dark" on his Nu & Improved label with up to the minute remixes. The single was well received and spent several weeks on the US club play chart. A pairing with Gianatos again in 2011 produced the track "It's All About The Music," also released on the Nu & Improved label. This was available on two compact discs, one featuring the U.S remixes and another with the U.K. remixes. There were also download-only remixes, entitled "The Soul Mixes." Once again Brooks was well received and had moderate chart success.

In 2013 Gianatos recorded the new dance track "I Like The Way You Move" with Brooks. The track featured backing vocals by Scherrie Payne (former "Supreme") and Joyce Vincent Wilson and Pamela Vincent (of "Tony Orlando & Dawn" fame). This was released as a "Bonus-Exclusive" on the compilation First Ladies of Disco – Rick Gianatos Presents the Music.

She has returned to making club appearances, including a spot at L.A.'s "Don't Tell Mama" in November 2013.

Also in 2013, Brooks was included in the book The First Ladies Of Disco.

On April 19, 2014, the video and CD-single (with ten mixes) of "I Like The Way You Move" were released. The video features a star-studded cast, including Scherrie Payne, Charlo Crossley and Peggi Blu.

Brooks' daughter Yvette (Marine) Barlow was a member of the Mary Jane Girls.

== See also ==
- List of number-one dance hits (United States)
- List of artists who reached number one on the U.S. dance chart
