= Role Aids =

Role-playing game supplement

Role Aids is a line of role-playing game supplements published by Mayfair Games starting in 1982 intended for use with Advanced Dungeons & Dragons.

== Publication history ==
As a veteran role-playing gamer, Bill Fawcett decided to get Mayfair Games into the RPG field, and the company began its Role Aids game line by publishing Beastmaker Mountain (1982). Darwin Bromley was involved with the Chicago Wargaming Association and its CWAcon convention, where the first Role Aids fantasy adventures by Mayfair were run: Beastmaker Mountain, Nanorien Stones (1982) and Fez I (1982). Bromley used his legal expertise to determine that Mayfair could legally use the trademarks of TSR if done carefully, so beginning with their Dwarves (1982) supplement Mayfair stated clearly that they did not hold the trademark by adding a notification on the cover: "Advanced Dungeons & Dragons is a trademark of TSR Hobbies, Inc. Use of the trademark NOT sanctioned by the holder."

Gary Gygax had advocated for TSR to make a licensing agreement with Mayfair Games regarding the Role Aids line of game supplements, but he was outvoted during the board meeting held to consider the license.

Ray Winninger brought back the Role Aids line in the early 1990s, intending to start it again using Advanced Dungeons & Dragons material which was more sophisticated than material that TSR was publishing at the time.

In 1993, Mayfair was sued by TSR, who argued that Role Aids—advertised as compatible with Advanced Dungeons & Dragons—violated their 1984 trademark agreement. While the court found that some of the line violated their trademark, the line as a whole did not violate the agreement, and Mayfair continued publishing the line until the rights were bought by TSR.

== Publications ==
- Apocalypse
- Archmagic
- Beastmaker Mountain
- Beneath Two Suns
- Blasted Land
- Clockwork Mage
- Crystal Barrier
- Dark Folk
- Deadly Power
- Demons
- Demons II
- Denizens of Og
- Denizens of Vecheron
- Denizens of Verekna
- Dragons
- Dragons of Weng T'sen
- Dwarves
- Elven Banner
- Elves
- Evil Ruins
- Fantastic Treasures
- Fantastic Treasures II
- Fez I: Valley of Trees
- Fez I: Wizard's Vale
- Fez II: The Contract
- Fez III: Angry Wizard
- Fez IV: Wizard's Revenge
- Fez V: Wizard's Betrayal
- Fez VI: Wizard's Dilemma
- Final Challenge
- Giants
- Ice Elves
- The Keep
- Kobold Hall
- Lich Lords
- Monsters of Myth & Legend
- Monsters of Myth and Legend II
- Nanorien Stones
- Pinnacle
- A Portal to Adventure
- Question of Gravity
- Shadows of Evil
- Shipwrecker
- Swordthrust
- Throne of Evil
- To Hell and Back
- Tower of Magicks
- Undead
- War of Darkness
- Witches
- Wizards

== Reception ==
Kelly Grimes and Aaron Allston reviewed the first four products in the Role Aids line, Beastmaker Mountain, Nanorien Stones, Fez I, and Dwarves, and the Role Aids line as a whole in The Space Gamer #58. They commented that "most of the titles are characterized by a great deal of thought, attention to detail, and usefulness, and can indeed provide relief to the harried gamemaster." They noted that "all four are characterized by good printing quality and typesetting, adequate-to-good layout and formatting, average maps, and mediocre art; the folders for the adventures seem sturdy enough and are an innovative touch." They concluded the review by saying: "For the most part, the RoleAids are worth the asking price. Most of the modules share some minor problems. It seems as though each designer decided at some point, 'This is where my contract says I ought to get silly.' Silliness is not inherently wrong for FRPGs – but here it occasionally serves to break a mood that the designers (and DM) might had worked too hard to set."

Rick Swan wrote two reviews of Role Aids:

- In Issue 72 of The Space Gamer, Swan commented, "Gamers new to Dungeons & Dragons are often surprised to discover that TSR isn't the only company producing suitable roleplaying material. Mayfair is among the best of them, and their RoleAids series is certainly worth checking out by any Dungeons & Dragons fan. Unlike so many so-called 'universal' roleplaying modules, which can require extensive reworking before they're in a playable format, RoleAids modules have been designed with D&D specifically in mind."
- In his 1990 book The Complete Guide to Role-Playing Games, Swan noted that "Though many companies have published generic [role-playing] supplements, none have matched the consistent quality of Mayfair's Role Aids series ... All of the books are excellent." Swan concluded by giving the series of supplements a solid rating of 3 out of 4.
