= Eurorails =

Railroad board game

- Logo used for the first through third editions.
- Designers: Darwin Bromley; Steven Courtemanche; Larry Roznai
- Illustrators: Mike Atkinson; Maria Cabardo; Ike Scott; Stefan Sierhej
- Publishers: Mayfair Games
- Publication: 1990; 35 years ago
- Genres: Economic; Railroad
- Players: 2–6
- Playing time: 180–240 minutes
- Age range: 10+

Eurorails is a railroad board game published by Mayfair Games in 1990 as part of the Empire Builder series. Players connect cities by building and extending train lines through Europe to deliver cargo and earn money.

== Publication history ==
Eurorails was designed by Darwin Bromley, Steven Courtemanche, and Larry Roznai and released in 1990 by Mayfair Games. It was published as a spin-off of Empire Builder which expanded the game's geography to Europe. It is a part of what is known as the "Crayon Rails" games or "the Empire Builder series" along with other games such as British Rails, Australian Rails, Russian Rails, Iron Dragon, Lunar Rails, and Martian Rails.

== Gameplay ==
To start, players are each given $50 million European Currency Units (ECU), three Demand cards, and one freight Loco card showing the speed and load capacity of their train. Each player's turn consists of two parts: transport and building.

=== Transport ===
On their turn, a player can first move, load, and unload their train, as well as pay fees, and collect payment for deliveries. This phase is skipped by all players for the first two rounds of the game. Trains may move freely on a player's own track or pay ECU $4 million to operate on another player's track in order to travel between cities to pick up and deliver requests from Demand cards. Demand cards show the demand for three goods, the requesting city, and the payment for delivery. If the player reaches the destination of one their cards carrying the goods to fulfill the request, the goods are returned to the bank and the player collects the specified payment. The completed Demand card is discarded and the player and the player draws another. If it is an Event card, the event happens immediately and the player draws another card.

=== Building ===
Following the delivery of goods, a player can choose spend up to ECU $20 million to either build train tracks or upgrade their train. Players start with freight Loco cards, which can be upgraded into either a fast freight with greater speed but the same load capacity, or a heavy freight with greater load capacity but the same speed. From either, the train can then be upgraded into a superfreight with greater speed and load capacity.

Railroads are built by drawing a line with wax crayons or other erasable markers from one milepost to the next on the map. Costs vary depending on terrain and city; the cost for building to each milepost is:

- ordinary dot: ECU $1 million
- mountain marker: ECU $2 million
- alpine marker: ECU $5 million
- small or medium city: ECU $3 million
- major city: ECU $5 million

Building across a river adds an additional ECU $2 million to the cost, and building across an ocean inlet or lake costs an additional ECU $3 million. Ferry ports can also be constructed, with prices differing based on location and varying from ECU $1-5 million.

=== Ending the game ===
The first player to both amass $250 million and have railways connecting seven of the eight major cities is the winner.

== Reception ==
Eurorails won the Origins Award for Best Modern-Day Boardgame of 1990.

In the book Family Games: The 100 Best, Jeff Grubb praised the game for its improved and refined design compared to its predecessors. Brian Walker, writing for Strategy Plus, praised the game for its accurate geography and use of the ECU. In Issue #104 of Games, Sid Sackson said of Eurorails, "Although reaching [the end] will take the better part of an evening, the game is so engrossing that you probably won't even notice." It was also featured in Games' 1992 Games 100.

== Reviews ==
- Wisconsin State Journal
