= Allen Hammack =

American game designer

Allen Hammack is a role-playing game designer.

== Personal life ==
Allen Hammack grew up in Birmingham, Alabama. Hammack was living in Lake Geneva, Wisconsin in 1980. He played a muleteer in a production of "Man of La Mancha" at the Elkhorn Area High School which featured performances from area residents.

Hammack was living with his wife Susan in Williams Bay, Wisconsin by 1982, when he was accepted into the MBA program at the Lake Forest Graduate School of Management in Lake Forest, Illinois. Hammack left Lake Geneva with his wife and returned to Birmingham, where he opened the game and bookshop called the Lion and Unicorn in 1984. Hammack was running monthly Dungeons & Dragons games for adults at his store by 1985 to teach parents about it and clear up misinformation about the game. Hammack also began showing episodes of Doctor Who in his store. Hammack sold his store around 1992 and began working as a lab technician for the Jefferson County Water Pollution Laboratory.

== Career ==
Allen Hammack joined TSR in 1978, where he was one of a few employees who designed, wrote, and edited games. Hammack wrote the adventure The Ghost Tower of Inverness (1979). Hammack was the developer and editor for the 1980 role-playing game Top Secret, and with Merle Rasmussen who wrote the game, they wrote an article that year for Dragon titled "The Super Spies" with dossiers on spies from James Bond to Maxwell Smart. Hammack wrote the 1981 adventure Assault on the Aerie of the Slave Lords. Hammack was the design manager for TSR Hobbies, Inc. by 1982. He was also editing and designing games for TSR at that time. Hammack designed the 1982 board game Viking Gods for TSR. TSR got into financial trouble in the early 1980s and let go of middle-level management personnel, including Hammack.

Hammack wrote the supplements Fantastic Treasures (1984) and Fantastic Treasures II (1985) for Mayfair Games. A young woman in Ragland, Alabama was murdered in 1985 by participants in a live action role-playing game version of Top Secret, to which Hammack responded that "It's such a departure from what the game is intended to be that I can't even begin to tell you what they might be doing or what guidelines they might follow." Hammack wrote the 1986 adventure Day of Al'Akbar.
