= Chronomancer (supplement) =

1995 role-playing game supplement

- Cover of the first edition
- Genre: Role-playing game
- Publisher: TSR
- Publication date: 1995
- Media type: Print

Chronomancer is a supplement to the 2nd edition of the Advanced Dungeons & Dragons fantasy role-playing game.

== Contents ==
Chronomancer presents rules for a wizard class which specializes in time-related magic, and presents new spells.

== Publication history ==
Chronomancer was originally developed for Mayfair Games. In 1991, TSR, Inc. sued Mayfair for violating a trademark agreement made between the two companies in 1984. In 1993, TSR "came to another out-of-court agreement with Mayfair. Since Mayfair was at the time on their way out of the roleplaying business, they sold the entire Role Aids line to TSR... including some unpublished manuscripts, one of which was to become Chronomancer. Chronomancer might have been intended as part of a new magic-user line for Role Aids, spinning out of their Archmagic (1993) box set".

The Mayfair "manuscript was originally scheduled to be written by Lisa Stevens and Vic Wertz" but after Stevens' freelance contract was bought out by Wizards of the Coast, the project ended up being written by Loren Coleman. After TSR bought Mayfair's Role Aids line, Matt Forbeck developed the unpublished manuscript and "brought it more in tune with TSR's publications". In August 1995, the supplement was published.

== Reception ==
Trenton Webb reviewed Chronomancer for Arcane magazine, rating it a 7 out of 10 overall. Webb comments that "Chronomancer sets up a wizard class that specialises in leaping around in time and not being seen." He noted that the chronomancer's spell list "seems underpowered at first, yet its true power (spookily in character, this) only becomes apparent after time. Far sooner than non-specialist mages, chronomancers get their hands on serious spells that, when used precisely, cause major carnage [...] Such spells are dangerous, and the referee is offered control over their impact by the manual's split player/ref structure. Secondary spell descriptions are provided for the referee's benefit and open up some truly entertaining roleplay possibilities: when a chronomancer tries a new spell, he has only a rough idea of its ramifications." Webb concludes his review by saying: "With such a complex idea as messing with time there are inevitably grey areas, and this may discourage some from dabbling; but those who dare will be rewarded with a game in which both the PCs and the referee can be truly surprised."
