= Wizards (Mayfair Games) =

Tabletop role-playing game supplement

- Genre: Role-playing game
- Publisher: Mayfair Games
- Publication date: 1983
- Media type: Print

Wizards is a supplement for fantasy role-playing games published by Mayfair Games in 1983.

== Contents ==
Wizards consists of six adventure scenarios intended for mid-level player characters, each one focusing on a powerful wizard from myth or fiction: Gilgamesh, Merlin, Circe, Morgan LeFay (by Lynn Abbey), Shadowjack (by Roger Zelazny), S. Carolinus (by Gordon R. Dickson), Aahz and Skeeve (by Robert Lynn Asprin), and Lythande (by Marion Zimmer Bradley). The book features introductions written by Abbey, Zelazny, Dickson, Asprin, and Bradley.

== Publication history ==
Wizards was edited by Bill Fawcett, with a cover by Tim White, and was published by Mayfair Games in 1983 as a 112-page book.

After the publication of Dwarves, the fourth Role Aids supplement, Shannon Appelcline noted that Mayfair Games "published additional AD&D Role Aids supplements quickly and in volume. The line featured many adventures as well as an increasing number of source books, including race- and class-related books" such as Dark Folk (1983), Wizards (1983) and Elves (1983), and that "Each product proudly proclaimed its use with AD&D, though the disclaimer was soon moved to the back cover".

== Reception ==
Robert Dale reviewed Wizards for White Dwarf #57, giving the book a rating of 6 out of 10 overall. After giving poor ratings to Elves, Dwarves, and Dark Folk, he commented that "Fortunately for my blood pressure, Wizards is a much better book. It suffers from the same appalling presentation (anybody who produces an Arthurian adventure and talks about the 'Seige Perlious' should be bastinadoed to death), but succeeds almost in spite of itself." He comments how "I have not come across a more effective translation of literature into FRP, and I actually enjoyed reading some of the scenarios which, generally speaking, captured the atmosphere of the novels they drew from. The stories are well thought-out (especially Gilgamesh( have reasonably objectives and credible characterisations. I did take exception to the hybrid Dark Age and Chivalric background to the Arthurian adventure, for the justification of the action was inconsistent with the plot. Accepting this however, The Pillar of Clinschor plays well enough." Dale went on to say, "I retain mixed feelings about Wizards on the grounds that though there is material in the book for several evenings play, there will be problems integrating the differing scenarios into any long-term campaign (unless of course they have the same setting), and the book therefore lacks unity Wizards succeeds on its own terms, to some extent, despite the presentation, but it is of limited value otherwise."

== Reviews ==
- Abyss Quarterly #50 (Winter, 1992)
