= Crystal Barrier =

- Authors: Cory Glaberson
- First published: 1987

Crystal Barrier is an adventure for fantasy role-playing games published by Mayfair Games in 1987.

== Plot summary ==
Crystal Barrier is an adventure scenario intended for player characters of levels 6-8, and is a follow-up to a scenario published in the Dragons supplement. The characters are dispatched to another world to aid in a war involving good dragons against evil dragons, and will need to enter the fortress of the Necromancer to set the soul of the Dragon Lord free.

Crystal Barrier is an adventure in which the player characters are pulled to another dimension through a crystal barrier to put a stop to a drug which could affect the balance of a civil war between the dragons of the Dragonlands.

== Publication history ==
Crystal Barrier was written by Cory Glaberson, with a cover by Boris Vallejo, and was published by Mayfair Games in 1987 as a 40-page book. The adventure module was part of the Role Aids line.

== Reception ==
Graeme Davis reviewed Crystal Barrier for White Dwarf #90. He noted that "Crystal Barrier is written by Cory Glaberson, the author of Mayfair's Dragons supplement, and draws information from that work, although it is not dependent upon it. [...] The dragons are not the standard AD&D variety, but can still put up a respectable fight, and the party is well advised to co-operate, at least at first." He continued by stating that in the other dimension past the crystal barrier "there are some interesting effects and monsters around, as well as some hard fights if the random encounters go against the party. 60 Ghouls could give even a quite well-equipped 6th-8th level party a fair amount of trouble. The main villain is a very nasty piece of work, and has a range of new spells and special powers which will appeal to hardware buffs once again. The showdown in his castle is a standard dungeon bash, and so, really, is the whole adventure, but the special effects of this alternate dimension make it more interesting than the general run of hack and slay adventures. It's quite heavy going, and I think it might give a party of up to 10th level a good run for their money. There are powerful monsters, less powerful ones in great numbers [...] and a couple of whimsical touches that you will either love or loathe, like zombies wearing magical sunglasses which allow them to see through fog, and a gnoll with a pump-action shotgun. There is a very interesting twist to the final encounter, too, which may lead to a dilemma for at least one member of the party." Davis concludes his review by saying, "If you're looking for an old-fashioned mid-level dungeon bash with some interesting twists, this one is for you."
