= Ice Elves =

- Character levels: 7-9
- Authors: Bruce Humphrey
- First published: 1985

Ice Elves is an adventure for fantasy role-playing games published by Mayfair Games in 1985.

== Contents ==
Ice Elves is an adventure scenario intended for player character levels 7-9, which takes place in an ice kingdom, including hazards such as glaciers, white dragons, ski pirates, and frost giants, and presents rules involving "ice-rigger" combat and survival in arctic environments, as well as new magic spells and monsters to encounter. The book makes use of material included in the Elves supplement.

== Publication history ==
Ice Elves was written by Bruce Humphrey, with a cover by Boris Vallejo, and was published by Mayfair Games in 1985 as a 32-page book.
