= The Keep (Mayfair Games) =

Role-playing game supplement

- Authors: Daniel Greenberg, Samuel Shirley, Gregory Maples, and Anne Jaffe
- First published: 1984

The Keep is an adventure for fantasy role-playing games published by Mayfair Games in 1984.

== Plot summary ==
The Keep is an adventure scenario intended for player character levels 9-12 based on the plot of the film The Keep. The character must defend against the evil of the Keep starting in the age of magic, and then in the Middle Ages, and finally in 1941 while the Nazis control central Europe.

The adventure takes place over three sections, with all events occurring in different time periods in the same location. The first portion is set an ancient age, involving a battle between Molasar and its armies against the Order of the Dragon. The second portion continues the exploration of the mysterious Keep in the year 1476, and the final portion is set in 1941 involving a confrontation against the German army. The book contains a special section to simplify running the final encounter, including game statistics for weapons, equipment, and non-player characters for the Nazis.

== Publication history ==
The Keep was written by Daniel Greenberg, Samuel Shirley, Gregory Maples, and Anne Jaffe, and was published by Mayfair Games in 1984 as a 40-page book.

Several properties were discussed for the Role Aids line but never got licensed, although an adventure based on the movie The Keep was one of the few licensed Role Aids books to be published.

== Reception ==
Rick Swan reviewed the adventure in The Space Gamer No. 72. He commented: "If you're unfamiliar with The Keep, it's not for lack of opportunities. The original so-so novel has spawned a so-so movie, a so-so boardgame, and now a roleplaying module in the RoleAids series from Mayfair that continues the tradition. The extraordinary complexity of the storyline which spans eons of struggle against forces of evil makes playing The Keep an ordeal even for the most experienced GM and a near impossibility to the novice." He added that "The designers do deserve credit for attempting to make things manageable." Swan commented that "It's not often a fantasy roleplayer gets a chance to take on the Third Reich, and the uniqueness of the setting makes it a very satisfying encounter for players and GM alike [...] In spite of the incongruity, the Nazis work surprisingly well; GMs unwilling to tackle the entirety of The Keep might consider lifting this section for use in another campaign." He continued: "As for working your way through The Keep as a whole, good luck. Assuming the GM is able to get a handle on the storyline (which will require several readings of the module along with a strong imagination to fill in the blanks), there are literally dozens of characters to keep track of through changes in identity, personality, and actions." Swan concluded his review by saying, "Make no mistake – complexity doesn't always translate into depth, and The Keep is a struggle that doesn't pay off for either the players or the exhausted GM. With the exception of the Nazis, this is for die-hard 'Keep' fans only."

== Reviews ==
- Analog Science Fiction and Fact
