= Monsters of Myth and Legend II =

Tabletop role-playing game supplement

- Cover art by Boris Vallejo
- Authors: Laurel Nicholson; John Keefe
- Illustrators: Boris Vallejo; Timothy Zon
- Genre: Fantasy RPG
- Publisher: Mayfair Games
- Publication date: 1989

Monsters of Myth and Legend II is a supplement published by Mayfair Games in 1989 as part of their Role Aids line that details monsters and deities that can be used in a fantasy role-playing game.

== Description ==
Monsters of Myth and Legend II provides descriptions, illustrations and game statistics compatible with Advanced Dungeons & Dragons (AD&D) for 75 monsters and gods. These are taken from five different areas of the world:

- Africa (taken from numerous regions)
- Central America (Aztec and Maya)
- Inuit (called "Eskimo")
- Japan
- the Middle East (Sumeria and Persia).

The book also describes myths and legends from these areas, and provides new spells and magic items.

== Publication history ==
Mayfair Games started as a board game publisher, but in 1982, seeing the popularity of the fantasy role-playing game AD&D, they entered that market with the Role Aids series of AD&D-compatible supplements designed to provide content for gamemasters. One of these was Monsters of Myth and Legend II, a 96-page perfect-bound softcover book published in 1989 that was written by Laurel Nicholson and John Keefe, with cover art by Boris Vallejo and interior illustrations by Timothy D. Zon.

== Reception ==
In Issue 44 of Abyss (Winter 1989), Ian Hense was not impressed, calling the content "five of the most useless mythos for a fantasy campaign ... Sure, some of these could be useful somewhere, someday. But for ten dollars, I could go to the library and do my own research and get much more information than what is provided here." Hense did find the descriptions of monsters and deities "fairly in-depth, but I found it difficult to care. The effort and work required to work something like an Ingalilik into my campaign would just not be worth it." Hense concluded by saying that for gamemasters who were looking for something out of the ordinary, "this just might be your bag. But please don't buy it for the production quality, as the art sucks, the paper is cheap, and three colors in the interior doesn't fix that."

In the same issue, Dave Nalle went further, calling the book a "cesspool." Nalle pointed out that the authors had taken myths and legends scattered across the very large continent of Africa, and mixed them together indiscriminately, while also making several serious errors. Nalle also thought the descriptions of only two deities from Central and South America ignored "hordes of others, and [paid] no attention to other rich cultures like those of the Inca and Iroquois people." Nalle was particularly incensed by the Middle East section, pointing out that many of the deities and creatures discussed were not from Sumerian or Persian culture. Nalle concluded, "a flashy [Boris Vallejo] cover does not make this horrible insult to our intelligence an adequate substitute for decent scholarship and respect for the reader."

Lawrence Schick, in his book Heroic Worlds, noted that "The Eskimo section breaks some new ground, but the rest are pretty standard."

In a retrospective review written 25 years after the book's publication, RPG historian Stu Horvath called the Boris Vallejo cover art "frankly gorgeous" but noted "there is some taxonomical confusion between cultural groups and geographic regions ... Three of those are overly broad, flattening the beliefs of many cultures and there quite a few insensitivities that are infuriatingly casual." Horvath concluded, "On the other hand, I do think the selection of monsters is pretty good."

== Reviews ==
- Games Review (Volume 2, Issue 5 - Feb 1990)
- GamesMaster International Issue 1 - Aug 1990
