= Shadows of Evil (Mayfair Games) =

Tabletop role-playing game adventure

- Character levels: 4-7
- Authors: Stephen R. Bourne
- First published: 1984

Shadows of Evil is an adventure for fantasy role-playing games published by Mayfair Games in 1984.

== Contents ==
Shadows of Evil is composed of two adventure scenarios intended for character levels 4–7, in which a cursed valley must contend with evil druids. The book includes information about Celtic and druidic culture and presents new spells and magic items.

== Publication history ==
Shadows of Evil was written by Stephen R. Bourne with Bill Fawcett, with a cover by Boris Vallejo, and was published by Mayfair Games in 1984 as a 96-page book.
