= Witches (Mayfair Games) =

Role-playing games supplement

- Cover art by Joe DeVelasco
- Author: Nigel D. Findley
- Illustrator: Roger Raupp; Joe DeVelasco
- Genre: Role-playing game
- Publisher: Mayfair Games
- Publication date: 1990

Witches is a supplement for fantasy role-playing games published by Mayfair Games in 1990 that details the potential for a witch as a character.

== Contents ==
Witches is a supplement that contains descriptions and rules for creating a witch character for Advanced Dungeons & Dragons (AD&D).

The book presents backgrounds and guidelines for nine player character subclasses:

- "Classical Witches": Ancient Greece
- "World of Faerie": Celtic magic
- "Medieval Witches"
- "Age of the Occult": The Golden Dawn movement of the 19th century
- "Witches in the Modern World"
- "Voodoo"
- "Animistic Witches": Witchcraft in various African cultures
- Elemental Witches": Fictional witches using elemental magic from AD&D
- "Deryni Witches": Spellcasters from the Deryni novels of Katherine Kurtz

== Publication history ==
Mayfair Games started as a board game publisher, but in 1982, seeing the popularity of the fantasy role-playing game AD&D, they entered that market with the Role Aids series of AD&D-compatible supplements designed to provide content for gamemasters. One of these was a 1990 publication titled Witches, a 96-page perfect-bound soft cover book written by Nigel D. Findley, with cover art by Joe de Velasco, and interior art by Roger Raupp.

== Reception ==
In Issue 46 of Abyss (Summer 1990), Dave Nalle admitted that the book was "attractively produced", but was dismissive of its contents, asking "How many religious, social and ethnic minority groups is it possible to offend in a single volume? ... The basic conceptual flaw in Witches is the egregious stereotyping of all ethnic and religious groups which are not white and Christian as inherently evil. When combined with careless research and plain ignorance, the result is an offensive piece of trash."

In Issue 23 of White Wolf (October–November 1990), Stewart Wieck noted "Unfortunately, the product seems to have been rushed through production. There are numerous typographical errors in the book (and even on the back cover), but these are minor problems that do not lessen the quality of the material." Wieck concluded by giving this book a rating of 4 out of 5, saying, " Almost any fantasy campaign that involves different kinds of magic could gain something from this supplement."
