= Swordthrust (Mayfair Games) =

Tabletop role-playing game adventure

- Authors: Sam Shirley
- First published: 1984

Swordthrust is an adventure for fantasy role-playing games published by Mayfair Games in 1984.

== Plot summary ==
Swordthrust is an adventure scenario intended for player characters of levels 3–7. The book details a mountain village, a dwarven cavern, and a five-level dungeon of ice located inside the head of a gigantic slumbering Ice Titan.

Swordthrust is an adventure in which the player characters search for the Ice Titan of legend buried under the snow that covers the Chatar Mountains. The characters explore a five-level "dungeon" which is actually inside the brain of the sleeping Titan. The avian Fancies and reptilian Durges also war with each other for control of the mind of the Titan. The characters may also encounter physical manifestations of the memories of the Titan from his entire lifetime of experiences. The player characters will be able to search for pieces of magic armor hidden throughout his mind.

== Publication history ==
Swordthrust was written by Sam Shirley and Daniel Greenberg, with a cover by Janny Wurts, and was published by Mayfair Games in 1984 as a 40-page book. The adventure module was part of the Role Aids line and was suitable for Dungeons & Dragons or similar systems.

== Reception ==
Rick Swan reviewed the adventure in The Space Gamer No. 72. He commented that "Swordthrust is a solid example" of how modules in the Role Aids line have been designed with Dungeons & Dragons specifically in mind: "With a minimum of tinkering, it can be played smoothly on its own or can be dropped nearly into just about any ongoing campaign." He added: "With a setting as imaginative as this, just about anything is possible and for the most part, the designers rise to the occasion. The 'memories' provide some of the most bizarre encounters you're ever likely to run across. [...] Knowing that literally anything can happen keeps player interest high. He continued: "Swordthrust could have been a classic ... if just a little more effort had gone into a final polish. Given the nearly limitless possibilities of the premise, too many of the encounters are distressingly run-of-the-mill. [...] The first half of the module rambles quite a bit; a good editor could have easily cut it in half. One more draft could have taken care of most of this." Swan concluded his review by saying: "All in all, though, Swordthrust is a very respectable effort. It's generally well-presented, original in approach, and quite playable. Those seeking an alternative to TSR-produced modules would do well to investigate RoleAids, and Swordthrust is a good place to start."
