= Dark Folk (Mayfair Games) =

1983 role-playing game supplement

- Cover
- Genre: Role-playing game
- Publisher: Mayfair Games
- Media type: Print

Dark Folk is a supplement for fantasy role-playing games published by Mayfair Games in 1983.

== Contents ==
Dark Folk is a supplement describing the behavior and cultures of the five main "humanoid" races: orcs, goblins, kobolds, gnolls, and trolls. It includes five scenario for character levels 5-9, each involving one humanoid type.

== Publication history ==
Dark Folk was edited by Paul Karczag, with an article by Robert Lynn Asprin, and a cover by Janny Wurts, and was published by Mayfair Games in 1983 as a 96-page book.

After the publication of Dwarves, the fourth Role Aids supplement, Shannon Appelcline noted that Mayfair Games "published additional AD&D Role Aids supplements quickly and in volume. The line featured many adventures as well as an increasing number of source books, including race- and class-related books" such as Dark Folk (1983), Wizards (1983) and Elves (1983), and that "Each product proudly proclaimed its use with AD&D, though the disclaimer was soon moved to the back cover".

== Reception ==
Robert Dale reviewed Dark Folk for White Dwarf #57, giving the book a rating of 3 out of 10 overall. He called Dark Folk "execrable, excruciating and extortionate", stating that "the price should dissuade any self-respecting gamer" from buying it. He felt that the purpose of the book, to aid roleplaying, is negated by the pseudo-scientific style in which the material is presented. He found that the adventures in the book were not specifically designed for dark folk, "despite the apparent intention to change player attitudes to (for example) trolls. Indeed the dark folk hardly escape from their traditional role as opponents and amusements of adventurers. Poor misunderstood trolls remain poor, misunderstood and better dead." Dale concluded that Dark Folk was a "merely amateur" rehashing of "widely current material lacking the redeeming features of a coherent setting or adequate presentation."
