= Evil Ruins =

Tabletop RPG adventure

- Authors: Stephen T. Bourne and Martin F. King
- First published: 1984

Evil Ruins is a fantasy role-playing game adventure published by Mayfair Games in 1984 as part of their Role Aids line of products. Although the adventure does not specify the rules that should be used, it is compatible with TSR's Advanced Dungeons & Dragons rules, although Mayfair was not licensed to produce AD&D material.

== Plot summary ==
The player characters travel to the castle of Tintagel to uncover the unknown circumstances around the death of Ethelwaine, heir to the Tintagel throne. Along the way they encounter squirrels who try to rob them, intelligent spiders, and a sordid non-player character who can help them find the hidden castle. Once they arrive, the characters find that the castle was destroyed by evil forces, leaving a four-level underground ruin for the party to search for clues to solve the mystery. If the characters are able to clear the ruins of hazards, the castle can be rebuilt into a religious retreat.

Evil Ruins is a designed for character levels 2-5.

== Publication history ==
In 1982, Mayfair Games entered the role-playing game market with Role Aids, a series of unlicensed adventures and supplements that were designed to be compatible with AD&D but carefully skirted around material trademarked by TSR. Eventually over 50 products were published in the Role Aids line.

One of the products was the 32-page adventure Evil Ruins, written by Stephen T. Bourne and Martin F. King, with cover art by Boris Vallejo and published by Mayfair in 1984.

== Reception ==
In Issue 72 of The Space Gamer February 1985), Rick Swan commented "In the introduction to Evil Ruins, the designers state that the module is intended as an 'intellectual challenge,' but don't take that claim too seriously. For the most part, Evil Ruins is a straightforward search-the-dungeon adventure with a mystery grafted on to give the players some motivation." Swan liked the progression of atmosphere, noting, "Care has been taken to insured that each succeeding level is more foreboding than the one before; bedrooms and storage chambers soon give way to bat caves and torture chambers, effectively increasing the tension as the adventure progresses." However Swan did find some issues, pointing out "it's all too familiar. Inside the castle, there are no real surprises for experienced players, what with the usual monsters (zombies, orcs, ghouls) guarding the usual treasures (gold, weapons, magic items). Worse, the game comes to an awkward halt if the players don't stumble upon the correct artifact or NPC with the crucial clue that leads to the next encounter. Independent-minded players may be frustrated by the amount of nudging needed from the GM to keep them on the right path." Despite this, Swan concluded "Still, Evil Ruins is a competent production and, in the RoleAids tradition, perfectly suited for Dungeons & Dragons fans. Nothing special, but entertaining in a modest way."

In Issue 23 of the British game magazine Imagine, Chris Hunter called this "Something which should make a good game with a little work." Hunter did not like "the small, barely legible and sometimes incorrect maps." He also pointed out the race of intelligent spiders who had swords strapped to their legs but had no hands with which to wield them. Hunter concluded, "The whole thing would feel a lot better if the monsters etc. were beefed up and the scenario used for say, 6–8th level instead of the 2–5th suggested."

In Issue 38 of Abyss, Paul Sudlow called this an adventure "designed to appeal to novice players who want more out of adventuring than 'hack and slash'." Sudlow found that "The adventure has enough twists in the plot (and subplot) to keep undemanding players interested, and there are some variations on standard monsters to keep more jaded players on their toes." Sudlow concluded, "Evil Ruins is well organized and is different enough from most other dungeon adventures to warrant a look."
