= Pinnacle (Mayfair Games) =

Role-playing game supplement

- Character levels: 4-5
- Authors: Dan Greenberg
- First published: 1986

Pinnacle is an adventure for fantasy role-playing games published by Mayfair Games in 1986.

== Plot summary ==
Pinnacle is an adventure scenario intended for player characters of levels 4-5 who join a tournament to climb a mountain called the Pinnacle, which is supposedly unclimbable but is actually hollow and holds an ancient secret inside.

This adventure involves a race to the top of a mountain which has been arranged by the mysterious aristocratic Gentlemen's Adventuring Society. The player characters will use investigative skills in addition to climbing skills, as well as the ability to fight when they encounter two new monsters.

== Publication history ==
Pinnacle was written by Dan Greenberg, with a cover by Stephen Venters, and was published by Mayfair Games in 1986 as a 32-page book. The adventure module was part of the Role Aids line.

== Reception ==
Graeme Davis reviewed Pinnacle for White Dwarf #90. He commented that "Pinnacle has an interesting cover, with three practically-naked people attempting to die of frostbite up a mountain." Davis concluded his review by saying, "The climb itself takes up nearly a third of the 32 pages, and is entertaining as well as challenging. The whole adventure will appeal to a group who prefer investigation and role-playing to simple dungeon bashes, and with a GM who is good at colourful NPCs, it could be a real delight."
