= Chesley Award for Lifetime Artistic Achievement =

The Chesley Award for Lifetime Artistic Achievement is given by the Association of Science Fiction and Fantasy Artists (ASFA) to recognize the achievements of a science fiction or fantasy artist for work over their entire careers.

== Winners and nominees ==
Year	Winner	Other nominees
2007	John Jude Palencar	
2008	Michael Wm. Kaluta	
2009	Julie Bell	Roger Dean; Dan Dos Santos; James Jean; Stephan Martinière; Shaun Tan
2010	Greg Hildebrandt	
2011	Boris Vallejo	Gerald Brom (aka "Brom"); Jeffrey Catherine Jones; Ian Miller; Jean Giraud (aka "Moebius"); Darrell K. Sweet
2012	TBA	Jim Burns; Jean Giraud (aka "Moebius"); Charles Vess
