= Undead (Mayfair Games) =

Role-playing game supplement

- Genre: Role-playing game
- Publisher: Mayfair Games
- Publication date: 1986
- Media type: Print

Undead is a supplement for fantasy role-playing games published by Mayfair Games in 1986.

== Contents ==
Undead is a campaign setting supplement which details the volcanic realm known as Verdaise, which is ruled by the undead. The book presents a collection of new undead monsters, spells, and magic items, as well as details of tactics that undead use in war, as well as an adventure scenario that takes place in Verdaise and is intended for player characters of levels 6-9.

Undead is a supplement which details the campaign setting of the Verdaise region, which is built upon the floor of an enormous caldera of volcanoes, molten lakes, and lava tunnels, ruled by five Lichlords who serve the evil deity Dierguth. This god created the caldera when he blew up the mountain of Elgaard dwarves who had angered him, leaving an inhospitable land for the Lichlords to build undead legions, who conquered their neighboring lands and adding the inhabitants to their undead ranks. 200 dwarven freedom fighters have snuck into Verdaise through the lava tunnels, seeking to reclaim their homeland.

== Publication history ==
Undead was written by Laurel Nicholson and John Keefe, with a cover by Michael Whelan, and was published by Mayfair Games in 1986 as an 80-page book. The supplement was part of the Role Aids line.

== Reception ==
Undead was reviewed in Dragon #126 (October 1987) by Ken Rolston. He admitted that he was "a bit surprised at how good this supplement turned out. From the title, I envisioned an encyclopedic treatment of the standard undead types of most FRP games [...] with a couple of standard scenarios in which undead lords hide down in deep dungeons, guarded by scads of dead guys, daring bold adventurers to come in after them." Rolston added, "The volcanic terrain on the floor of the caldera [...] makes a unique and colorful campaign setting. The dead guys are nicely rendered. The discussion of undead unit tactics is pretty convincing [...] and there are some swell original spells, magical items, monsters, and grand sorcerous rituals that are specially tailored to the atmosphere and gaming elements of a campaign focusing on the undead." He continued: "The adventure is fairly linear, and there's quite a bit of dragging-around-by-the-nose, but this supplement is a good example of the genre. There are plenty of staging hints for hamming up the presentation, and plenty of resources for keeping the action moving and the players busy solving problems, parlaying with NPCs, and bashing dead guys. The final set piece really won my admiration." Rolston concluded his review by saying: "This is a quality AD&D game campaign supplement, comparable to some of TSR's better supplements. The setting is imaginative and fantastic; the dead guys are grim and menacing; there are plenty of neat new magics and monsters; and the adventure, while a bit contrived and manipulative, has some nice bits. The unusual two-color printing looks smart, and the graphic design is first-class. Nicholson and company have done a commendable job in advancing the reputation of Mayfair's modules."

Lawrence Schick in his book Heroic Worlds calls the book "Pretty good."
