= Clockwork Mage =

Fantasy role-playing game adventure

- Authors: Susan Stone and M.E. Allen
- First published: 1985

Clockwork Mage is an adventure for fantasy role-playing games published by Mayfair Games in 1985.

== Plot summary ==
Clockwork Mage is an adventure scenario designed for player characters of levels 2-5, in which the characters must search through the manor of two wizards when their practical jokes between them go out of control, and the characters must find the items to restore everything to normal.

Clockwork Mage is an adventure in which the player characters get in the middle of a long-lasting conflict between two older wizards who harass each other using elaborate tricks and practical jokes.

== Publication history ==
Clockwork Mage was written by Susan Stone and M.E. Allen, with a cover by Janny Wurts, and was published by Mayfair Games in 1985 as a 32-page book with a center-bound map screen. The adventure module was part of the Role Aids line.

== Reception ==
Rick Swan reviewed the adventure in The Space Gamer No. 76. He noted how the Role Aids line had been gradually improving up to that point, saying how "Clockwork Mage is another terrific effort, one that'll give a lift to all but the most jaded AD&Ders." Swan commented on the adventure's plot, stating "if that's not enough to hook you, wait'll you meet the Sims, a new class of creature that's sort of a cross between a robot and Pinocchio. I won't give any more away, but will add that it's unlikely your group has ever played an adventure quite like this." He continued: The practical joke aspect of Clockwork Mage is so much fun, I wish the designers had done more with it. You'll find yourself wanting more jokes and 'unconventional' obstacles. [...] The style of the adventure begs for a grand, solid twist at the end; where's the slam-bang battle with an army of Sims or the final joke-to-end-all-jokes? The reward at the end is unbelievably skimpy, but you'll see an easy – and obvious – solution to that problem when you read the module." Swan concluded his review by saying, "It's not often you run across a module with a sense of humor. It's rarer still to find a module for AD&D that, after all these years, can still make a claim to originality. Clockwork Mage can claim both. Add great graphics, a clear presentation, and a striking cover, and you've got one of the best fantasy supplements of the year."

== Reviews ==
- Game News #6 (Aug., 1985)
