= Elven Banner =

- Character levels: 2-4
- Authors: Laurel Nicholson
- First published: 1985

Elven Banner is an adventure for fantasy role-playing games published by Mayfair Games in 1985.

== Plot summary ==
Elven Banner is an adventure for player character levels 2-4 who will travel in time to find the missing Elven Banner. It makes use of information found in the Elves supplement.

== Publication history ==
Elven Banner was written by Laurel Nicholson, with a cover by Dawn Wilson, and was published by Mayfair Games in 1985 as a 32-page book with a removable cardstock map screen.
