= Elves (Mayfair Games) =

1983 role-playing game supplement

- Cover
- Genre: Role-playing game
- Publisher: Mayfair Games
- Media type: Print
- Pages: 96

Elves is a supplement for fantasy role-playing games published by Mayfair Games in 1983.

== Contents ==
Elves is a supplement describing elven characters and the various elven cultures, history, and gods. With six scenarios for elf characters, levels 4-7, one for each type of elf: wood elves, grey elves, dark elves, high elves, etc.

== Publication history ==
Elves was written by Cheron Fitzgerald Carr and Delbert Carr, Jr., with Daniel Greenberg, Anne Jaffe, and Sam Shirley, with a cover by Janny Wurts, and was published by Mayfair Games in 1983 as a 96-page book. A second printing was published in 1985.

After the publication of Dwarves, the fourth Role Aids supplement, according to Shannon Appelcline, Mayfair Games "published additional AD&D Role Aids supplements quickly and in volume. The line featured many adventures as well as an increasing number of source books, including race- and class-related books like Dark Folk (1983), Wizards (1983) and Elves (1983). Each product proudly proclaimed its use with AD&D, though the disclaimer was soon moved to the back cover."

== Reception ==
Robert Dale reviewed Elves for White Dwarf #57, giving the book a rating of 3 out of 10 overall. He called Elves "execrable, excruciating and extortionate", stating that "the price should dissuade any self-respecting gamer" from buying it. He felt that the purpose of the book, to aid roleplaying, is negated by the pseudo-scientific style in which the material is presented. He found that the adventures in the book were not specifically designed for elves. Dale concluded that Elves was a "merely amateur" rehashing of "widely current material lacking the redeeming features of a coherent setting or adequate presentation."
