= Final Challenge =

- Authors: Matthew J. Costello
- First published: 1984

Final Challenge is an adventure for fantasy role-playing games published by Mayfair Games in 1984.

== Plot summary ==
Final Challenge is a solo adventure scenario for a single player character, a fighter named Tel El'ryn who years earlier had assisted his friend Gwdion learn black magic without considering the consequences. Gwdion has become an evil wizard with great power, soEl'ryn must stop him from taking power over the entire land.

Final Challenge is an adventure in which the player character fighter Tel El'Ryn pursues Guidon and his Tower of Madness. The statistics for Tel El'Ryn are pre-generated, but the player can select four magic items to equip him with. The scenario uses a system of numbered paragraphs to move from event to event based on what decisions the player makes in each encounter.

== Publication history ==
Final Challenge was written by Matthew J. Costello, with a cover by Tom Kidd, and was published by Mayfair Games in 1984 as a 32-page book. The adventure module was part of the Role Aids line.

== Reception ==
Rick Swan reviewed the adventure in The Space Gamer No. 76. He commented on the adventure's format: "Any solitaire module without a magic ink pen or a cellophane mystery views is already a step ahead in my book. Don't get me wrong – I like a good gimmick as much as the next guy, but a strong story is worth a hundred magic pens. This is no news to Matt Costello, who's put together a clever plot, a colorful cast of characters, and an engagingly tricky puzzle to come up with one of the best solitaire modules in a long time." Swan stated: "Even without a referee, the design of Final Challenge is remarkably rich, complete with a simple but effective combat system and a hex-grid wilderness map that randomly generates its own encounters. In fact, Final Challenge has more in common with the old Barbarian Prince boardgame than it does with most solitaire modules (and that's a compliment, because Barbarian Prince was one terrific game)." He commented on the limitations of solo adventures: "The most frequent problem with solitaire modules is their limited play value, and it's a problem shared by Final Challenge. I got through the whole thing in about an hour and a half, although I admit that I stumbled into the key hexes by sheer dumb luck. Replay value is non-existent – when the mystery is solved, that's it. A system of alternate plots would be nice, but that'll give something for Mr. Costello to work on next time." Swan concluded by review by stating, "Kids who gobble up those 'endless adventure' interactive paperbacks ought to shake an extra couple of dollars from their piggy banks and try a copy of Final Challenge. Solitaire fans could easily get spoiled by modules as good as this."

== Reviews ==
- Game News #10 (Dec., 1985)
