= Wilderlands of the Fantastic Reaches =

Role-playing game supplement

- Genre: Role-playing game
- Publisher: Judges Guild
- Media type: Print
- Preceded by: Wilderlands of the Magic Realm
- Judges Guild Product Code: [JG 300]

Wilderlands of the Fantastic Reaches is a supplement for fantasy role-playing games published by Judges Guild in 1980. (JG 300)

== Contents ==
Wilderlands of the Fantastic Reaches is a campaign setting supplement which details the locations found on four large wilderness maps of the setting (Wilderness Maps 15-18).

The regions of the Isle of Dawn (#15), the Southern Reaches (#16), the Silver Skein Isles (#17), and the Ghinor Highlands (#18) are shown in full detail on the judge's maps and are roughly sketched out on the players' maps. The booklet describes and gives the location of many of the villages, castles, islands, ruins, relics, and monsters.

== Publication history ==
Wilderlands of the Fantastic Reaches features a cover by Jennell Jaquays, (Note: Credited as Paul Jaquays.) and was published by Judges Guild in 1980 as two 16-page booklets, four large maps, and a cover sheet.

== Reception ==
William Fawcett reviewed Wilderlands of the Fantastic Reaches in The Dragon #44. Fawcett commented that "This set of maps and their index is one of the most massive efforts of the Judges Guild. These maps when viewed as a whole are a gigantic effort and have to be considered one of the major projects in roleplaying games. When all spread out, these are the only gaming maps that surpass the GDW Europa maps in size."
