= Deadly Power =

- Authors: Laurel Nicholson, John Keefe, and Donald Nicholson
- First published: 1984

Deadly Power is an adventure for fantasy role-playing games published by Mayfair Games in 1984.

== Plot summary ==
Deadly Power is an adventure scenario intended for player characters of levels 6-9 who will need to figure out a riddle from ancient times so that they can locate the golden seeds of legend.

Deadly Power is an adventure in which two factions compete for a prize in the mining town of Shallotville, a box of magical seeds purported to grant unbelievable power. The warrior Mynor Yelad wants the player characters to obtain the seeds, claiming his father intended him to have them. The ruler Queen Enaj wants the characters to get the seeds for her because she believes that Mynor will use them for evil so she wants to destroy them.

== Publication history ==
Deadly Power was written by Laurel Nicholson and others, and was published by Mayfair Games in 1984 as a 40-page book. Deadly Power was designed by Laurel Nicholson, John Keefe, and Donald Nicholson. Deadly Power is an adventure in the Role Aids line from Mayfair and was intended for use with Dungeons & Dragons or similar systems.

== Reception ==
Rick Swan reviewed the adventure in The Space Gamer No. 72. He stated that "Although the quest for the seeds is the heart of Deadly Power, it's the sorting out of these allegiances that gives it a special flavor and depth." He commented that "like the other modules in the RoleAids series, it's a qualify effort both in execution and premise. The quest for the seeds requires four separate steps to complete, and even though each step is fairly involved, smooth play is insured by thorough descriptions and instructions from the GM. [...] The uncertainty of exactly who's on your side and who isn't adds a nice edge to the proceedings. With a lot of action and hair-raising encounters (including a trip through Hell), it's unlikely that even the most jaded of roleplayers will lose interest with Deadly Powers. He continued: "A more benevolent GM might want to defuse some of the harsher encounters before running the adventure. At one point, for instance, a character becomes permanently evil just for touching a harmless-looking staff; at another, the same thing happens just for trying on a helmet. The GM will also need to supply a fair amount of transitional information as it's often hard to tell exactly how the party is supposed to get from one location to the next. Better maps would have helped, and so would additional NPCs to guide adventurers who stray too far." Swan concluded his review by saying: "But these few rough spots are easily cleaned up with a little advance preparation. Overall, Deadly Power is a nice blend of puzzle solving and swordplay, intense from beginning to end. Recommended for the courageous."
