= Making Contact =

Making Contact may refer to:

- Making Contact (album), a 1983 album by UFO
- Joey (1985 film), a German film, directed by Roland Emmerich, released in some countries as Making Contact
- Making Contact: Uses of Language in Psychotherapy, a 1986 book by Leston Havens
- Making Contact (book), a 1998 non-fiction book on UFOs
