= Fez IV: Wizard's Revenge =

- Authors: James Robert and Len Bland
- First published: 1986

Fez IV: Wizard's Revenge is an adventure for fantasy role-playing games published by Mayfair Games in 1986.

== Plot summary ==
Fez IV: Wizard's Revenge is a scenario for character levels 3-8, a party of dwarves and elves. The two parties, aided by a young version of the time-traveling wizard Fez, must find two halves of a caduceus to save an older, dying Fez. The adventure features dungeons under a barrow mound, in a stone sphinx, and within an active volcano.

A party of four elves and a party of four dwarves are provided, and the two groups meet up and decide that must combine forces.

== Publication history ==
Fez IV: Wizard's Revenge was written by James Robert and Len Bland, with a cover by Michael Whelan, and was published by Mayfair Games in 1986 as a 32-page book. The adventure module was part of the Role Aids line.

== Reception ==
Graeme Davis reviewed Wizard's Revenge for White Dwarf #90. He stated that the adventure " would be difficult to play" with any characters other than those provided. Davis noted that "the first 15 pages of the adventure are merely by way of setting things up; there are extensive and very atmospheric introductions for both Elves and Dwarves, a lot of historical background, and a few preliminaries before the two groups meet up [...] All of this is fairly well done – the insights into Elven and Dwarven society and culture are particularly interesting – but from here things go downhill." He added: "After all the introductions and preliminaries have been dealt with, there are only 16 pages or so for the adventure itself, and as might be expected it has turned out very light on detail and very sketchily written – little more than a series of one-paragraph-per-room map keys, in fact." Davis concluded the review by saying, "Wizard's Revenge is the fourth Role Aids adventure to feature Fez, the wizard of time travel, who must be important because he gets a TM all to himself, as well as a selection of time-based spells that will have hardware buffs twitching. I haven't seen the previous three Fez adventures, but it seems that they all stand alone, rather than being connected in a campaign series. When he first appears, he has been accidentally summoned from the Illinois-Ohio football game, and is dressed in a sweatshirt, jeans and a baseball cap and clutching a can of cold beer. All very well if you like this sort of whimsy. The dungeons themselves (there are several) are small, mostly sketchily written, and favour traps and riddles. There is a lot which can only be described as corny – 'Penultimate Mountain' next to 'Last Mountain,' for example – and the whole thing was very reminiscent of the kind of AD&D adventure that White Dwarf was publishing seven or eight years ago. It has its good moments, but it also has its bad half hours."
