= Monsters of Myth & Legend =

Tabletop role-playing game supplement

- Cover
- Genre: Role-playing game
- Publisher: Mayfair Games
- Media type: Print

Monsters of Myth & Legend is a supplement for fantasy role-playing games published by Mayfair Games in 1984.

== Contents ==
Monsters of Myth & Legend is a supplement with game statistics and descriptions for more than 100 monsters taken from the mythologies of the American Indian, Australian Aborigine, Chinese, Greek, Irish Celtic, and Norse; most of these creatures are illustrated.

Monsters of Myth & Legend is a sourcebook including encyclopedic listings of numerous creatures and deities to add to a fantasy campaign or to help with designing adventures. The book covers the Norse and Greek mythologies as well the legends of Ireland, China, the Australian Aborigines, and the American Indians. Each entry contains a physical description, background, game statistics and suggestions on how to use the creature during play. The book also contains an index, and four pages of tables for the gamemaster, as well as a bibliography of sources.

== Publication history ==
Monsters of Myth & Legend was written by Greg Gorden and Neil Randall, with a cover by Boris Vallejo, and was published by Mayfair Games in 1984 as a 96-page book.

== Reception ==
Rick Swan reviewed Monsters of Myth & Legend in The Space Gamer No. 75. He commented that "Regardless of whether you actually ever use this material in a roleplaying campaign, much of it makes for fascinating reading, particularly if you're as unfamiliar as I was with the mythologies of the Aborigines or the Irish. [...] even a casual browse through the book should give a GM plenty of new ideas. All necessary statistics are given, and even though they're biased towards Dungeons & Dragons, they're easy to adapt to other systems." He added: "With all of the care that went into the book, I'm surprised at the generally haphazard quality of the illustrations. Aside from the striking cover painting, most of the artwork is hit or miss, ranging from adequate to downright embarrassing – some of it looks like a junior-high artist's idea of 'scary.' The high quality of the text makes the amateurish visuals even more annoying, especially considering that a good illustration is a lot more effective than a column of written description in a sourcebook of this kind." Swan concluded the review by saying, "Although roleplaying sourcebooks are invaluable for game designers, I'm not completely sold on their usefulness for your average player (or even your average GM). But if you go for this kind of thing, you'll have to look long and hard to find a more interesting one than Monsters of Myth & Legend. It's a good package, fun to read, and guaranteed to have a lot of information you've never seen anywhere else."
