= Dwarves (Mayfair Games) =

1982 role-playing game supplement

- Cover
- Genre: Role-playing game
- Publisher: Mayfair Games
- Media type: Print

Dwarves is a supplement for fantasy role-playing games published by Mayfair Games in 1982, with a second edition published in 1984. It was the fourth Role Aids supplement, and was centered on an adventure and featured background material for using dwarves in role-playing games. It received mixed reviews in game periodicals including The Space Gamer, Different Worlds, and White Dwarf.

== Contents ==
Dwarves is a supplement outlining Dwarven culture and magic, with a description of a Moria-like Dwarven city and two towns. It also includes a scenario for dwarf characters of levels 5-10, a quest across a wilderness to an evil fortress to recover a sacred axe.

Dwarves is a campaign setting supplement which details the relatively secluded dwarven kingdom of Ostohar, intended to be added into an existing campaign. The book describes the history of the kingdom, detailing locations in Ostohar including several cities and a major citadel, as well as presenting an essay on life in the kingdom, the religion of the dwarves, their magic and artifacts, and rules for dwarf character generation, as well as several appendices.

== Publication history ==
Dwarves was written by Paul Karczag, and was published by Mayfair Games in 1982 as a 96-page book. A second edition was published in 1984, featuring a cover by Bob DeWitt.

Dwarves was the fourth Role Aids supplement from Mayfair Games, and according to Shannon Appelcine it "moved the line in a few new directions. Though it centred on an adventure, like the others" before it (Beastmaker Mountain, Nanorien Stones and Fez I), "it also featured considerable background material. What made it really different, however, was its subhead, which read: 'A Complete Kingdom & Adventure suitable for Advanced Dungeons & Dragons.'" Appelcine also noted that the publisher "Darwin Bromley had legal expertise that most other publishers did not and he felt that Mayfair could legally use TSR's trademarks as long as they were careful. Thus Mayfair made it clear that they were not the trademark holders by printing on the cover of Dwarves: 'Advanced Dungeons & Dragons is a trademark of TSR Hobbies, Inc. Use of the trademark NOT sanctioned by the holder.'"

== Reception ==
Kelly Grimes and Aaron Allston reviewed Dwarves in The Space Gamer #58. They commented: "The most striking thing about this campaign setting is the sheer amount of work that went into it. It required quite a lot of raw talent and energy to get this put together; trouble is, some of the talent and energy stayed raw." They note that "The big advantage of Dwarves is this: The DM can take the module and drop it whole, though undoubtedly with modifications, into an existing campaign, and not have to worry about lacking some sort of answer to a player's question about dwarves." Although they detailed several flaws, Grimes and Allston concluded their review by saying "it's a good package. If a DM really wants a sourcebook on dwarves, this is a good item to pick up."

Anders Swenson reviewed Dwarves for Different Worlds magazine and stated that "In summary, Dwarves does not live up to its pretentious format or heavy price tag. The world still awaits the definitive book on dwarfs."

Robert Dale reviewed Dwarves for White Dwarf #57, giving the book a rating of 3 out of 10 overall. He called Dwarves "execrable, excruciating and extortionate", stating that "the price should dissuade any self-respecting gamer" from buying it. He commented, "Note the 'scientific' attitude to gaming, an attitude surely inconsistent with the fantasy element of role-playing. The approach which you that Dwarven sex-equality was established during the years 2690-2143BP only serves to demystify the mysterious". He felt that the purpose of the book, to aid roleplaying, is negated by the pseudo-scientific style in which the material is presented, "for prospective Dwarves must search a pudding of 'facts' to recover any useful material". He found that the adventures in the book were not specifically designed for dwarves. Dale concluded that Dwarves was a "merely amateur" rehashing of "widely current material lacking the redeeming features of a coherent setting or adequate presentation."
