= Throne of Evil =

Tabletop role-playing game adventure

- Authors: Stephen Bourne
- First published: 1984

Throne of Evil is an adventure for fantasy role-playing games published by Mayfair Games in 1984.

== Plot summary ==
Throne of Evil is an adventure scenario intended for player characters of levels 4-6 that takes place in 12th-century England. The characters are sent by the Norman court to Castle Wraithstone to capture the evil March Lord. The book details a castle and dungeons.

In Throne Of Evil, the characters join up at an inn and go to a castle to eliminate an evil lord, which they are only able to access by way a cavern inhabited by monsters.

== Publication history ==
Throne of Evil was written by Stephen Bourne, with a cover by Rowena Morrill, and was published by Mayfair Games in 1984 as a 32-page book. The adventure module was part of the Role Aids line.

== Reception ==
Rick Swan reviewed the adventure in The Space Gamer No. 75. He called the adventure "little more than a by-the-numbers rewrite of a typical TSR hack-and-slasher circa 1978". Swan added: "Anyone who's even casually experienced with fantasy roleplaying will be in familiar territory with Throne of Evil [...] For what it's worth, there are plenty of well-rendered maps, including one just for the players (always a nice touch). At least you can sense the hand of a good editor at work as there is very little superfluous material to distract from the [...] adventure." He continued: "If Mayfair indeed felt compelled to add a simple hack-and-slasher to their RoleAids line, you'd think they'd have at least insisted on some new monsters or some new treasures or at least an interesting trap or two. Instead, we get the usual assortment of snoozers [...] the 'political intrigue' referred to in the introduction is little more than an uninvolving fluctuation of loyalties among some of the NPCs. Somebody ought to tell these guys that this approach to fantasy modules is hopelessly old-fashioned. Sure, it's got its place – it's a nice way to introduce young players to the hobby, if nothing else. But it's already been done to death and done much better elsewhere." Swan concluded the review by saying, "If you have an opening for a product of this kind, my suggestion is to pick up an old TSR D&D module. Just for old time's sake, I bought a half dozen of 'em at a book store recently for a buck and a half each. As for Throne of Evil, let's let it go as an unfortunate misfire from the usually excellent RoleAids series. I mean, nobody's perfect."

== Reviews ==
- Game News #4 (Jun 1985)
