= Fez V: Wizard's Betrayal =

Role-playing game

- Character levels: 4-8
- Authors: James Robert and Len Bland
- First published: 1987

Fez V: Wizard's Betrayal is an adventure for fantasy role-playing games published by Mayfair Games in 1987.

== Contents ==
Fez V: Wizard's Betrayal is a scenario for player character levels 4–8 mixing technology and magic. The adventurers' spaceship crashes on a plateau inhabited by dwarves, orcs, et al. To escape (and save the world), they must free Fez from the alien spaceship where he is held captive.

== Publication history ==
Fez V: Wizard's Betrayal was written by James Robert and Len Bland, with a cover by Boris Vallejo, and was published by Mayfair Games in 1987 as a 32-page book.
