= Fantastic Treasures =

1984 role-playing game supplement

- Cover
- Genre: Role-playing game
- Publisher: Mayfair Games
- Media type: Print
- ISBN: 0-912771-20-8

Fantastic Treasures is a supplement for fantasy role-playing games published by Mayfair Games in 1984. A second volume (ISBN 978-0-912771-37-3) was published by Mayfair Games in 1985.

== Contents ==
Fantastic Treasures is a supplement listing hundreds of magic items and weapons drawn from myths and legends around the world, alphabetized from A to L. The next year the book listing items M to Z was printed.

== Publication history ==
Fantastic Treasures was written by Alan Hammack, with a cover by Boris Vallejo, and was published by Mayfair Games in 1984 as a 96-page book.

Mayfair and TSR came to an agreement on September 28, 1984, in which TSR granted Mayfair a license to use the Advanced Dungeons & Dragons trademark on the Role Aids books, and Fantastic Treasures (1984) was the first product to make use of this license.
