= Train game =

Board game of construction and operation of railways

A train game or railway game is a board game that represents the construction and operation of railways. Train games are highly involved, hobby board games that simulate the economic and logistic details of running a railway. Like wargames, train games represent a relatively small niche in the games market.

Not every game with a train in it is a "train game". For example, the domino game Mexican Train is not a train game because it does not represent railway operations. Likewise, Ticket to Ride could be considered a train themed game, rather than a train game because it does not contain any of the economic or operational features of running a railway.

== Varieties ==
Classic train games generally fall into two broad categories: 18XX games and "crayon rail" games:

18XX games originated in 1974 with the publication of Francis Tresham's 1829 and continued with such titles as 1830, 1856, and 1870. These games involve buying and selling stock in railway companies, laying track, and running locomotives to generate a profit. Most are hex map games in which cardboard tiles are laid to build sequences of railway track. Many 18XX games can be further divided into "1829 style games," which emphasize company development, and "1830 style games," which emphasize robber baron stock market manipulation.

Crayon rail games are more streamlined and do not contain a stock market component. They focus on laying track, delivering goods, and making profits. Instead of the hex map system found in 18XX games, railway tracks are drawn with crayons or dry erase markers. The first mass market crayon style game was Darwin Bromley and Bill Fawcett's Empire Builder which was released in 1980 by Mayfair Games, however Railway Rivals by David Watts had been popular - especially amongst postal gamers - for nearly 10 years before that. Other games in the Empire Builder series include British Rails, Eurorails, India Rails, and North American Rails, to name a few. Some of these are even set in a fantasy or science fiction world, such as Iron Dragon and Lunar Rails.

Another type of train game is Silverton, a Mayfair game that uses wooden blocks instead of crayons to represent increasing completion of rail networks (the pieces also block competitors in a mechanic similar to the station-tokens in 18xx games). Mayfair republished the original Two Wolf Games Silverton and includes the expansion map as part of the basic game.

The mechanics in Friedemann Friese's Power Grid were taken from crayon rail games. Its predecessor Funkenschlag even used crayons to denote power lines. In this sense, Power Grid is more of a "train game" than such train themed games as Ticket to Ride, Union Pacific, and TransAmerica, which do not involve as many train related mechanics.

== Tournaments ==
Several competitions for train gamers are held at major game conventions by the Train Gamers Association. Their largest event is the Puffing Billy Tournament, but other competitions include Iron Man, the 18XX Championship, and the Empire Builder International. The Puffing Billy Tournament was named in honor of the world's oldest surviving steam locomotive, Puffing Billy, which was built in 1814.

Another important event for train gamers is the Chattanooga Rail Gaming Challenge, which has been held in Chattanooga, Tennessee since 1997. In 2007, the competition grew to over 60 participants.

Train games are also popular at the annual World Boardgaming Championships which routinely attracts over 1000 participants, over 100 of whom play titles such as Rail Baron, Empire Builder and 18XX.

== See also ==
- 18XX games
- Train simulator
- Rail Baron
