= Kobold Hall =

Tabletop role-playing game supplement

- Authors: Bill Fawcett
- First published: 1983

Kobold Hall is an adventure for fantasy role-playing games published by Mayfair Games in 1983.

== Contents ==
Kobold Hall is an adventure in which the player characters will need to search a dungeon to obtain all of the Eyes of the Hydra.

== Publication history ==
Kobold Hall was written by Bill Fawcett, and was published by Mayfair Games in 1983 as a 32-page book with an outer folder.

The adventure was produced in a limited edition of 750 copies for Origins 1983, which was held in Cobo Hall, Detroit.
