= Wake Island (disambiguation) =

Wake Island is an atoll in the Pacific Ocean. It may also refer to:

- Wake Island (film), starring Brian Donlevy
- USS Wake Island (CVE-65), a World War II American aircraft carrier
- Wake Island (wargame), a 1991 wargame that simulates the World War II battle

== See also ==
- Battle of Wake Island, an early World War II battle for the island
- USS Wake, a WW2 ship named for Wake Island
