= Shipwrecker =

Role-playing game supplement

- Character levels: 4-7
- Authors: Sue Stone
- First published: 1983

Shipwrecker is an adventure for fantasy role-playing games, published by Mayfair Games in 1983.

== Plot summary ==
Shipwrecker is an adventure scenario intended for player characters of levels 4-7 who are hired to return a golden chalice that a pirate band stole. The book details a port town, goblin lair, and pirate caverns.

Shipwrecker is an adventure in which the player characters become stranded in the Wrighters Town seaport community, where King Nathan offers help if they can recover the Chalice of Storms from the Pirate Caverns, guarded by the inhabitants of the Goblin Caverns.

== Publication history ==
Shipwrecker was written by Sue Stone, with a cover by Janny Wurts, and was published by Mayfair Games in 1983 as a 32-page book. The adventure module was part of the Role Aids line and was suitable for Dungeons & Dragons or similar systems.

== Reception ==
Rick Swan reviewed the adventure in The Space Gamer No. 72. He commented that "Anybody who thinks roleplaying is for kids ought to take a look at Shipwrecker, as it's one of the most literately written modules I've ever come across. The detailed background notes read like a passage from a history text, and the NPC descriptions could be life stories of real people (real people, that is, who use magic rings and are part elf). Much thought has gone into the design and development of the community, right down to the economic and administrative considerations. The cohesiveness and logic of the setting make for a very realistic feel; there's nothing superficial about Shipwrecker." He continued: "It's this attention to detail that makes Shipwrecker somewhat disappointing as a game. So many pages are given over to background and setting explanations that there's not much room left over the adventure itself. True, players could spend a lot of time exploring the city, but no real progress towards completing the mission can be made until they get to the Pirate Caverns, and that's halfway through the module. The trek through the caverns is also fairly dull; a lot of the encounters are run-of-the-mill [...] and many of the cavern areas are simply empty. Within the context of the storyline it all makes sense, but gamers looking for start-to-finish excitement are bound to be bored." Swan concluded the review by saying "If designer Sue Stone had been given another 10 to 20 pages to flesh out the actual adventure portion of Shipwrecker, this could have been about as good as they get. But even with its flaws, Shipwrecker is better than most. It's a solid example of good writing and intelligent presentation; would-be designers would do well to check it out."
