= Tower of Magicks =

Role-playing game supplement

- Character levels: 3-6
- Authors: Bill Fawcett
- First published: 1983

Tower of Magicks is an adventure for fantasy role-playing games published by Mayfair Games in 1983.

== Contents ==
Tower of Magicks is an adventure scenario focusing on problem solving instead of combat, intended for characters of good alignment and of levels 3-6, and serves as a sequel to Beastmaker Mountain. The book contains floor plans for dungeons. The adventure can be used with Dungeons & Dragons and Tunnels & Trolls.

== Publication history ==
Tower of Magicks was written by Bill Fawcett, with a cover by Janny Wurts, and was published by Mayfair Games in 1983 as a 40-page book.
