= Empire Builder (board game) =

1982 board game

- Logo used for the fifth and final edition.

- First edition components of Empire Builder, including painted diecast locomotives
- Designers: Darwin Bromley; Bill Fawcett
- Publishers: Mayfair Games
- Publication: 1982; 44 years ago
- Genres: Strategy game
- Players: 2–6
- Setup time: 5 minutes
- Playing time: 60–240 minutes
- Chance: Low
- Age range: 12+
- Skills: Resource allocation

Empire Builder is a railroad board game originally published by Mayfair Games in 1982 that underwent several editions and eventually branched out into international and fantastical locations.

In February 2018 Mayfair Games was acquired by French game publisher/distributor Asmodee, however rights to the Empire Builder games (and other Mayfair titles) are no longer retained by Asmodee.

== Publication history ==
Empire Builder was designed by Bill Fawcett and Darwin Bromley and released in 1982 by Mayfair Games. The original game was set in the United States and Canada. This was replaced with a new version that added Mexico. A number of spin-off games have been released, expanding the game's geography to other countries (British Rails, Eurorails, Australian Rails, Russian Rails, etc.) and other worlds or planets (Iron Dragon, Lunar Rails, Martian Rails). These games are collectively known as "the Empire Builder series".

Empire Builder games are sometimes called "crayon rails" games because players mark their tracks on the board with wax crayons (or with other types of erasable markers).

== Description ==
All of the Empire Builder games operate on the same principles of construction of railroad track and delivery of goods.

=== Components ===
The first edition of the game had the following components:

- 28" x 22" foldout map of the United States and southern Canada, marked with a grid of dots, and coated with a plastic cover to ease removal of crayon marks.
- 4-page rulebook
- list of goods and cities
- 6 painted diecast metal locomotive tokens (these were replaced by simply plastic tokens in subsequent editions)
- a 112-card deck with Demand, Action, and Event cards
- 6 crayons
- die-cut cardboard counters representing goods to be moved and types of freighters being used
- play currency

== Gameplay ==
=== Setup ===
To begin play, players are given $40 million and dealt three cards from the card deck. Players discard Event and Action cards, redrawing from the deck until everyone has three Demand cards.

=== Building costs ===
To build a railroad costs various amounts depending on terrain and city. Drawing from any dot or city to:

- an ordinary dot: $1 million
- a mountain marker: $2 million
- a small city: $3 million
- a major city: $5 million

Building across a river adds an additional $2 million to the cost of joining dots. Likewise building across an ocean inlet costs an additional $3 million.

=== First two turns ===
Players cut the card deck; the player who draws the highest priced Demand card goes first. The active player can spend up to $20 million to build initial track. The same opportunity to build track passes around the table clockwise. When the last player has built track, a second round of track building takes place, again with a limit of $20 million; this time play starts from the last player and goes counter clockwise.

=== Start of regular play ===
The first player places their locomotive on any city, adds up to two loads of any goods available in that city, and moves the locomotive up to its the maximum speed along the player's own track. If the player reaches a city for which the player has a Demand card AND the player is carrying the goods listed on the card, the player returns the goods to the bank and collects the money specified on the card. The player discards the used Demand card and draws another card. If it is an Event card, the event happens immediately, and the player draws another card. If the player has any movement left, the player can move their locomotive further. Play then passes to the next player.

=== Victory conditions ===
The first player to amass both $250 million and have railway connecting six of the seven major cities is the winner.

== Reception ==
In the September 1982 edition of Dragon (Issue 65), Gary Gygax gave a favourable review, saying, "Empire Builder is the best boardgame to come out in a long time. In my opinion it is the best available, being more complex and challenging than the simpler sort and not as tedious and complicated as those at the other end of the spectrum."

Eleven years later, in the December 1993 edition of Dragon (Issue 200), Allen Varney considered Empire Builder a classic that "rewards careful strategy and offers lots of replay value."

In Issue 2 of Games International, Brian Walker reviewed the third edition of Empire Builder, and noted the game's central weakness: the lack of interaction between the players. However he called the production values of the third edition "a big improvement on its predecessors", and concluded by giving the game a rating of 3.5 out of 5, saying, "If you like railways games and have a preference for the cerebral then this is definitely the game for you."

In the October 1994 edition of Pyramid (Issue #9), Scott Haring complimented Australian Rails, saying that both this game "and its brothers don't have the romantic thrills of other games -- there are no armies to defeat, no damsels to rescue, no dragons to slay. But it's a great strategic game, requiring brains and planning to win. And in my opinion, it's every bit as satisfying to survey a well-planned rail network and to count the earnings as it is to plant your foot on the belly of a slain dragon and count its gold. Every bit."

== Reviews ==
- Casus Belli #33 (June 1986)
- Games #39

== Awards ==
- At the 1991 Origins Award, Eurorails won Best Modern-Day Boardgame of 1990.
- At the 1995 Origins Awards, Australian Rails won Best Modern-Day Boardgame of 1994.
