= ICBM (disambiguation) =

ICBM refers to an intercontinental ballistic missile.

ICBM may also refer to:

- Institute for Chemistry and Biology of the Marine Environment, Lower Saxony, Germany
- I.C.B.M. (board game)
- ICBM (video game), a real-time strategy video game
- International Consortium for Brain Mapping; terms such as ICBM152, ICBM452 refer to brain atlases
- Tennison Gambit, a chess opening also known as the ICBM gambit

== See also ==
- ICBM address, derived from the name of the missile, an example of a geotag
