= The Worlds of Boris Vallejo =

Board game

The Worlds of Boris Vallejo is a board game for 2–6 players published by Mayfair Games in 1984 that uses the fantasy-genre artwork of Boris Vallejo.

== Gameplay ==
The Worlds of Boris Vallejo is a strategy board game. Its components are:

- Thirty world tiles, each featuring a different painting by Boris Vallejo
- Thirty world reference cards, one for each world tile
- A deck of cards, made up of characters, scrolls and artifacts, each with a numerical combat strength
- Plastic pawns

=== Set-up ===
One player chooses a world tile and places it on the tabletop. Players then take turns choosing world tiles and placing them so that they touch another tile. This continues until all thirty tiles have been placed. Each player then chooses one of the worlds to be their home tile, places their pawn on the home world tile, and receives the reference card for that tile.

=== Card draw ===
Each turn, the active player draws three cards from the deck, and may play up to two cards — a character, and an item that character can use — as defense on a world tile that they control.

=== Movement ===
Each turn, the active player can move their pawn one tile. If that tile is uncontrolled, the player now owns it, and receives the reference card for that world. If the world is controlled by another player, combat results.

=== Combat ===
The attacking player plays two cards — a character card and either an artifact card or scroll card. The total of the two cards' combat factors is compared to the combat factors of the cards that the defending player previously assigned to the world. Either player can ask other players to aid in the combat by providing one card to be added to either the attacker or defender. Whichever side has the greater sum of combat factors wins the combat.

=== Victory conditions ===
The first player to control eight worlds wins the game.

== Reception ==
Matt Williams reviewed Worlds of Boris Vallejo for Imagine magazine, and stated that "as an optimum strategy is discoverable in a handful of games, Worlds needs something extra to justify its price tag. Alas, it does not have it."

In the August 1985 edition of White Dwarf (Issue #68), Paul Mason admired the production values of the world cards, calling them "immaculately printed Boris pictures in glorious colour" although he pointed out that Vallejo's art "is completely incidental to the mechanics of the game." But the rest of the components were not as good — Mason called the cards only "competently produced", and the plastic pawns "the worst kind of plastic rubbish." Mason thought the rules were too similar to Cosmic Encounter, Risk and Talisman, saying, "this is a highly derivative game - its systems all originated in other games, and work better in those games than here." Mason also thought the game would go on far longer than its stated 30-minute playing time, since "an half-comptetent group of players will not allow anyone to win — allying in unison against anyone who gets dangerously close to the crucial eight worlds." He concluded by giving The Worlds of Boris Vallejo an extremely poor overall rating of only 3 out of 10, stating "The game strikes me as a cynical attempt to cash in on the popularity of Boris Vallejo's artwork, which displays a very low opinion of its intended market."

== Reviews ==
- Games #63 (May 1985)
