= Question of Gravity =

Tabletop role-playing game supplement

- Authors: Jerome Mooney
- First published: 1982

Question of Gravity is an adventure for fantasy role-playing games published by Mayfair Games in 1982.

== Contents ==
Question of Gravity is an adventure scenario designed for player characters of levels 2-5, which details a dungeon and a village located near the dungeon. The adventure is intended for Dungeons & Dragons and Tunnels & Trolls.

== Publication history ==
Question of Gravity was written by Jerome Mooney, with a cover by Janny Wurts, and was published by Mayfair Games in 1982 as a 24-page book.

== Reception ==
Lawrence Schick in his book Heroic Worlds describes the dungeon as "a bizarre Escherlike cubical structure".
