= Fez VI: Wizard's Dilemma =

1989 role-playing adventure

- Character levels: 4-6
- Authors: Robert Moore and James Robert
- First published: 1989

Fez VI: Wizard's Dilemma is an adventure for fantasy role-playing games published by Mayfair Games in 1989.

== Contents ==
Fez VI: Wizard's Dilemma is a scenario for character levels 4–6, the final entry in the Fez series. Fez the wizard is caught in a time paradox that may result in his ceasing to exist, and the adventurers must help him out of his predicament.

== Publication history ==
Fez VI: Wizard's Dilemma was written by Robert Moore and James Robert, with a cover by David Cherry and illustrations by Gerald O'Malley, and was published by Mayfair Games in 1989 as a 32-page book.

== Reception ==
Lawrence Schick in his book Heroic Worlds notes that the adventure "Includes a map of Chaos that the authors wish was funny."
