= To Hell and Back (Mayfair Games) =

To Hell and Back is a 1993 role-playing supplement published by Mayfair Games.

== Contents ==
To Hell and Back is a supplement in which information is included for the settings of Atlantis, Avalon, Faerieland, Selene, and Dante's Hell.

== Reception ==
Gene Alloway reviewed To Hell and Back in White Wolf #37 (July/Aug., 1993), rating it a 4 out of 5 and stated that "To Hell and Back is a good general supplement, despite being a little uneven. Much is left to the GM in order to make these locales work in their campaign. I do recommend To Hell and Back for those who are looking for some interesting ideas with which to spice up a campaign. And since To Hell and Back is part of the Realms of Fantasy series, perhaps we will see even more places drawn from legend and story."
