= Encounters (card game) =

1982 card game by Mayfair Games

Encounters is a card game published by Mayfair Games in 1982.

== Gameplay ==
Encounters is fantasy card game involving heroes fighting against monsters.

== Reception ==
William A. Barton reviewed Encounters in The Space Gamer No. 57. Barton commented that "Encounters is a very playable little game. If you like card games at all and fantasy games in general and don't think [the price] is too steep for one, you'll probably find Encounters an enjoyable investment."
