= Iron Dragon (board game) =

- Designers: Tom Wham & Darwin Bromley
- Publishers: Mayfair Games (UK, U.S.)
- Players: 2 to 6
- Setup time: approx. 10 minutes
- Playing time: 120 to 600 minutes
- Chance: Medium
- Age range: 12 years and up
- Skills: strategic planning, rail building

Iron Dragon is a board game by Mayfair Games. Unlike the other Empire Builder games, it is set in a fantasy world with dragon-based locomotives. Eden Games licensed the game from Mayfair to produce a Windows version of the game, Rail Empires: Iron Dragon.

== Gameplay ==
The goal of Iron Dragon is to connect seven of the game’s eight major cities with rails and amass 250 gold pieces. Players spend money to build railways and earn money by using them to deliver goods such as dragons, wands, spells, pipeweed, gems, wine and ale. Demand cards indicate three different combinations of good requested, city to which to deliver, and payout; generally longer distances between good production regions and destinations yield higher payouts. Players can upgrade trains for speed and cargo capacity, hire foremen to reduce building costs in various terrain, and even set sail to deliver cargo. Interaction between players is limited to competition for routes, as only one player can own the connection between any two markers, and the usually negative effects of event cards, which affect all players but may harm some more than others.

== Reception ==
Scott Haring reviewed Iron Dragon for Pyramid #13 (May/June, 1995) and stated that "Iron Dragon carries my highest recommendation."
