= Fez II: The Contract =

- Character levels: 3-8
- Authors: James Robert and Len Bland
- First published: 1983

Fez II: The Contract is an adventure for fantasy role-playing games published by Mayfair Games in 1983.

== Contents ==
Fez II: The Contract is a scenario for character levels 3–8. Player characters from the modern world are engaged by the time-traveling wizard Fez to perform seven impossible feats. The adventure is a mixture of magic and technology.

== Publication history ==
Fez II: The Contract was written by James Robert and Len Bland, with art by Victoria Poyser, and was published by Mayfair Games in 1983 as a 40-page book.
