= Giants (Mayfair Games) =

Role-playing game supplement

- Cover
- Genre: Role-playing game
- Publisher: Mayfair Games
- Media type: Print

Giants is a supplement for fantasy role-playing games published by Mayfair Games in 1987.

== Contents ==
Giants is a supplement which details 12 types of giants including information about where they live, their histories, the spells and magic items they use, and the pets and allies they keep. The supplement describes five new giant types: chaos, dwarven, forest, sea, and death. The supplement presents rules for using giants as player characters and a description of a campaign-setting of the giant city of Clanfast.

== Publication history ==
Giants was written by Bruce Humphrey, with art by Ray Rubin, and was published by Mayfair Games in 1997 as a 96-page book.
