= Hyborian Gates =

Collectible card game

- Card back to the Hyborian Gates CCG
- Publishers: Cardz
- Players: 2 or more
- Setup time: < 5 minutes
- Playing time: < 60 minutes

Hyborian Gates is an out-of-print collectible card game by Cardz.

== Publication history ==
It was first released in July 1995. It featured art from Boris Vallejo and Julie Bell. A total of 450 cards were released in the core set and an additional 10 promo cards were also released. Starter decks were said to contain 55 cards, but only contained 50 and booster packs had 15 cards. An expansion called Gatemasters was scheduled for a 1996 release but never materialized.

The company also published 1,000 booster packs of the original set containing 15 ultra rare cards; these were randomly distributed.

== Reception ==
According to Allen Varney of The Duelist the game was said to be "utterly dull".
