= Fantastic Treasures II =

Role-playing game supplement

- Cover
- Genre: Role-playing game
- Publisher: Mayfair Games
- Media type: Print

Fantastic Treasures II is a supplement for fantasy role-playing games published by Mayfair Games in 1985.

== Contents ==
Fantastic Treasures II is a supplement listing hundreds more magic items and weapons drawn from myths and legends around the world, alphabetized from M to Z, with a random treasure determination table for both volumes.

== Publication history ==
Fantastic Treasures II was written by Alan Hammack, with a cover by Boris Vallejo, and was published by Mayfair Games in 1985 as a 96-page book.
