= Rail Baron =

- Designers: R.S. Erickson; T.F. Erickson, Jr.
- Publishers: Avalon Hill
- Genres: Board game, train game
- Languages: English
- Players: 3 to 6
- Skills: Strategy

Rail Baron is a railroad board game for 3 to 6 players.

Rail Baron was initially published in the 1970s under the name Boxcars by the original designers R.S. Erickson and T.F. Erickson, Jr. It was soon acquired, renamed and reissued by Avalon Hill.

== Gameplay ==
Rail Baron is played on a map of the United States on which the routes of 28 historic railroads, such as the Baltimore & Ohio and the Southern Pacific have been marked. The map is divided into seven regions, Northeast, Southeast, North Central, South Central, Plains, Northwest and Southwest. Major US cities which are connected by the railroads act as destinations for travel. Dots on the railroad routes represent small towns along the way, and serve as distance markers for player movement.

The goal of each player is to accumulate money by moving their train token to map destinations which are generated at random via a lookup table. Large cities like New York and Chicago are more likely to be generated as destinations than small cities. Travel from one destination to the next is accomplished by rolling dice to determine distance that can be moved. Players then move their train token along map dots toward their destination.

Upon arrival at a destination, the player collects a cash payoff, and may use the money to upgrade their train engine to a faster model, or purchase a railroad. Railroad purchases are key to the game because an owner collects substantial fees from other players who ride their railroad during their movement. Meanwhile, the owner can ride their own railroads at no cost. Thus, an important decision in the game is whether to buy a variety of railroads in order to gain access to all areas of the map for oneself, or to buy railroads in a given area in order to monopolize it and collect the valuable use fees from opponents.

=== Winning ===
To win the game a player must accumulate $200,000 and then make a daring run back to their home city (their first city in the game) before any opponent can catch them via what is known as a rover play.

== Railroads ==
The 28 railroads depicted in the game correspond to 28 actual real-life railroads that operated in the early 20th century. The table below lists these 28 railroads, their cost within the Rail Baron game, their real-life years of operation and eventual corporate outcome, and their current status as of 2009.

Railroad	Game Cost	Real-Life Years of Operation	Real-Life Eventual Outcome	Currently¹ Part Of...
Southern Pacific	$42,000	1865–1996	Purchased by Rio Grande Industries but retained Southern Pacific name, later purchased by Union Pacific	Union Pacific
Atchison, Topeka, & Santa Fe	$40,000	1859–1996	Merged with Burlington Northern to become BNSF	BNSF
Union Pacific	$40,000	1862–present	Currently operating	Union Pacific
Pennsylvania Railroad	$30,000	1846–1968	Merged with New York Central to form Penn Central	Amtrak, Norfolk Southern
Chicago, Rock Island & Pacific	$29,000	1852–1980	Liquidated	N/A
New York Central	$28,000	1831–1968	Merged with Pennsylvania Railroad to form Penn Central	Amtrak, CSX
Baltimore & Ohio	$24,000	1830–1986	Taken over by the Chesapeake & Ohio to become the Chessie System	CSX
Missouri Pacific	$21,000	1849–1982	Merged with Union Pacific	Union Pacific
Chesapeake & Ohio	$20,000	1869–1972	Renamed to Chessie System	CSX
Southern Railway	$20,000	1894–1982	Merged with Norfolk & Western to create Norfolk Southern	Norfolk Southern
Chicago, Burlington & Quincy	$20,000	1849–1970	Merged with Great Northern, Northern Pacific and Spokane, Portland & Seattle to form Burlington Northern	BNSF
St. Louis & San Francisco	$19,000	1876–1980	Acquired by Burlington Northern	BNSF
Louisville & Nashville	$18,000	1850–1982	Merged with Seaboard Coast Line to create Seaboard System Railroad	CSX
Chicago, Milwaukee, St Paul & Pacific	$18,000	1847–1985	Acquired by the Soo Line Railroad	Canadian Pacific
Great Northern	$17,000	1890–1970	Merged with Chicago, Burlington & Quincy, Northern Pacific and Spokane, Portland & Seattle to form Burlington Northern	BNSF
Seaboard Air Line	$14,000	1880–1967	Merged with Atlantic Coast Line to form the Seaboard Coast Line	CSX
Illinois Central	$14,000	1851–1999	Acquired by Canadian National	Canadian National
Chicago & North Western	$14,000	1865–1995	Merged into Union Pacific	Union Pacific
Northern Pacific	$14,000	1864–1970	Merged with Chicago, Burlington & Quincy, Great Northern and Spokane, Portland & Seattle to form Burlington Northern	BNSF
Atlantic Coast Line	$12,000	1840–1967	Merged with Seaboard Air Line to form the Seaboard Coast Line	CSX
Norfolk & Western	$12,000	1838–1982	Merged with Southern Railway to create Norfolk Southern	Norfolk Southern
Gulf, Mobile & Ohio	$12,000	1938–1972	Merged with Illinois Central to form Illinois Central Gulf	Canadian National
Texas & Pacific	$10,000	1871–1976	Merged with the Missouri Pacific	Union Pacific
Western Pacific	$8,000	1903–1983	Acquired by Union Pacific	Union Pacific
Denver & Rio Grande Western	$6,000	1870–1988	Renamed to Southern Pacific after purchasing that railroad	Union Pacific
Boston & Maine	$4,000	1836–1983	Purchased by Pan Am Systems	Pan Am Systems
New York, New Haven & Hartford	$4,000	1872–1969	Merged into Penn Central	Amtrak
Richmond, Fredericksburg and Potomac	$4,000	1836–1991	Now part of CSX	CSX

¹ = As of September, 2009

== Variants ==
Several variants are gaining in popularity. The "Home Swap" lets players switch the home city and first destination before moving for the first time in case their first destination is an easily monopolizable one, or if they want to try to get a better home city. "Free Superchief" lets players upgrade to a SuperChief engine at no cost if they already have an Express engine; this both speeds the game and lessens the dominance of the Pennsylvania RR.

Fans of the game have created dozens of alternate maps for play. There now exist game maps of Europe, New York City, Colorado, and many other locations, as well as fictional regions. There is also a computer version which both speeds play and supports online multiplayer matches.

== Reviews ==
- Casus Belli #33 (June 1986)
- 1982 Games 100 in Games
- Jeux & Stratégie #13
- The Playboy Winner's Guide to Board Games
