= Nanorien Stones =

Role-playing game supplement

- Authors: Jim Gallagher and Steve Morrison
- First published: 1982

Nanorien Stones is an adventure for fantasy role-playing games published by Mayfair Games in 1982.

== Contents ==
Nanorien Stones is an adventure that takes the player characters into the four Elemental Planes. The book presents game statistics and illustrations for 20 new monsters, and the adventure was intended to be used with Dungeons & Dragons and Tunnels & Trolls.

In this adventure, the characters search the four elemental planes to find the magical Nanorien Stones and bring them back to the Prime Material Plane. The characters begin by walking through an unusual archway which takes them to the plane of Earth.

== Publication history ==
Nanorien Stones was written by Jim Gallagher and Steve Morrison, and was published by Mayfair Games in 1982 as a 32-page book.

Mayfair Games began its Role Aids game line by publishing Beastmaker Mountain (1982), Nanorien Stones (1982) and Fez I (1982).

== Reception ==
Kelly Grimes and Aaron Allston reviewed Nanorien Stones in The Space Gamer #58. They noted that the quest "starts out with a beautiful narrative to be read to the players to set the mood and provide background" but that "the adventure becomes progressively harder, making it an almost certain killer adventure before it ends. And when it does end, it leaves the players hanging, returning the characters to the prime material plane with little reward for their efforts." The detailed the adventure's "many and varied" flaws, including some of the "petty and mean" encounters and that "this unpleasantness is predetermined; it happens without the character's actions making a difference". Grimes and Allston concluded the review by saying: "This module isn't for everyone. In fact, it's doubtful that it's for anyone. With a great deal more work, it might be fun, but the buyer would be well-advised to leave this one sitting on the shelf."
