= A Portal to Adventure =

Supplement for Role Aids

A Portal to Adventure is a 1992 role-playing supplement published by Mayfair Games.

== Contents ==
A Portal to Adventure is a supplement in which non-player characters, locations for city and wildness settings, and magic items are presented.

== Reception ==
A. L. McCoy reviewed A Portal to Adventure in White Wolf #36 (1993), rating it a 3 out of 5 and stated that "A Portal to Adventure is a fun, easygoing work that, in a small way, can add some interesting sidebars to locales to a campaign. It is well done, more useful that not, and I found it stimulating and fun to read. If you would like to have a good but limited sourcebook for fantasy RPG ideas, this is a good buy."
