= Fantastic Wilderlands Beyonde =

1979 role-playing game supplement

- Cover
- Genre: Role-playing game
- Publisher: Judges Guild
- Media type: Print
- Preceded by: Wilderlands of High Fantasy
- Followed by: Wilderlands of the Magic Realm
- Judges Guild Product Code: [JG 67]

Fantastic Wilderlands Beyonde is a supplement for fantasy role-playing games published by Judges Guild in 1979. (JG 67)

== Contents ==
Fantastic Wilderlands Beyonde is a campaign setting that describes the locations on four large wilderness maps (Wilderlands Maps 7–10).

This supplement presents the vast wilderness areas of the Desert Lands (#7), Sea of Five Winds (#8), Elphand Lands (#9), and Lenap (#10), in full detail on maps for the gamemaster with a general overview of these regions on maps for the players. The booklet gives full descriptions and locations for villages, castles, islands, ruins, relics, and monsters found on the maps.

== Publication history ==
Fantastic Wilderlands Beyonde was written by Mark Holmer and Bob Bledsaw, and was published by Judges Guild in 1979 as a 32-page book, and four large maps.

== Reception ==
Kurt Butterfield reviewed Fantastic Wilderlands Beyonde in The Space Gamer No. 33. Butterfield commented that "The graphics on the map are beautiful and highly detailed. Many of the encounter areas, ruins, and treasures are quite interesting and imaginative. The basic description of each village is very helpful and saves the judge a lot of preparation time." He continues: "The main problem ancountered in the maps is that the hex numbers are difficult to read at times. There are quite a few typos in the booklet and several examples of too much treasure given away for little or no risk." Butterfield concluded his review by saying, "The judge will have to add a large amount of detail and make a few changes to make the wilderness more interesting. He is given too little detail for too much money."
