= Denizens of Verekna =

Denizens of Verekna is a 1993 role-playing supplement published by Mayfair Games.

== Contents ==
Denizens of Verekna is a supplement in which the Demons of the Mind are detailed.

== Reception ==
Gene Alloway reviewed Denizens of Verekna in White Wolf #37 (July/Aug., 1993), rating it a 3 out of 5 and stated that "Denizens of Verekna is full of great demons and good ideas. It uses the standard format for AD&D monster pages, so it will be easy to use as well. However, it does lack a background to the demons listed therein. Most appear to be able to stand alone with little relationship to their brothers. Perhaps in the future Mike Nystul and Mayfair will delve more into infernal politics - and bring us along to watch."
