= Darwin Bromley =

American attorney and game designer (1950–2019)

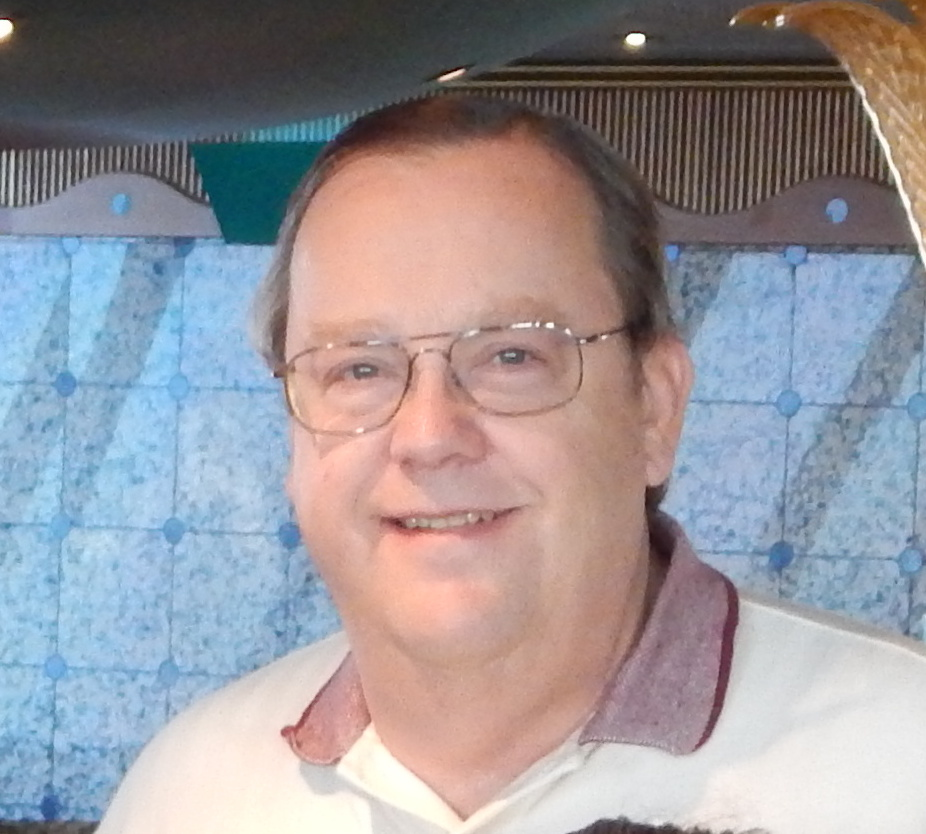
- Bromley at CruiseCon in 2015
- Born: Darwin Paul Bromley; October 23, 1950; Huntington, West Virginia, U.S.
- Died: January 2, 2019 (aged 68); Jacksonville, Florida, U.S.
- Occupation(s): Game designer, Attorney

Darwin Paul Bromley (October 23, 1950 – January 2, 2019) was an attorney and a game designer who had worked primarily on board games.

== Career ==
Darwin Bromley was an attorney who enjoyed railroad games, so he started the company Mayfair Games in 1980 to publish a railroad game that he designed; he named the company after the Mayfair neighborhood of Chicago where he founded it. Bromley made Bill Fawcett a partner in Mayfair Games soon after, and they worked together to design the game Empire Builder (1980). Bromley was involved with the Chicago Wargaming Association and its CWAcon convention, where the first Role Aids fantasy adventures by Mayfair were run: Beastmaker Mountain (1982), Nanorien Stones (1982) and Fez I (1982). Bromley used his legal expertise to determine that Mayfair could legally use the trademarks of TSR if done carefully, so beginning with their Dwarves (1982) supplement Mayfair stated clearly that they did not hold the trademark by adding a notification on the cover: "Advanced Dungeons & Dragons is a trademark of TSR Hobbies, Inc. Use of the trademark NOT sanctioned by the holder."

Bromley had an interest in German board games, and initially imported original games from Germany for sale in the United States. Bromley met Jay Tummelson of 54°40' Orphyte and they discussed the idea of their companies working together. Tummelson joined Mayfair Games in 1995, and for the next two years was involved with licensing German games under the direction of Bromley for the company to produce American versions; under Tummelson in 1996 alone, German games such as Grand Prix, Modern Art, Manhattan, Streetcar, and The Settlers of Catan were finally published in the United States. Bromley was the conceptual designer of Sim City: The Card Game.

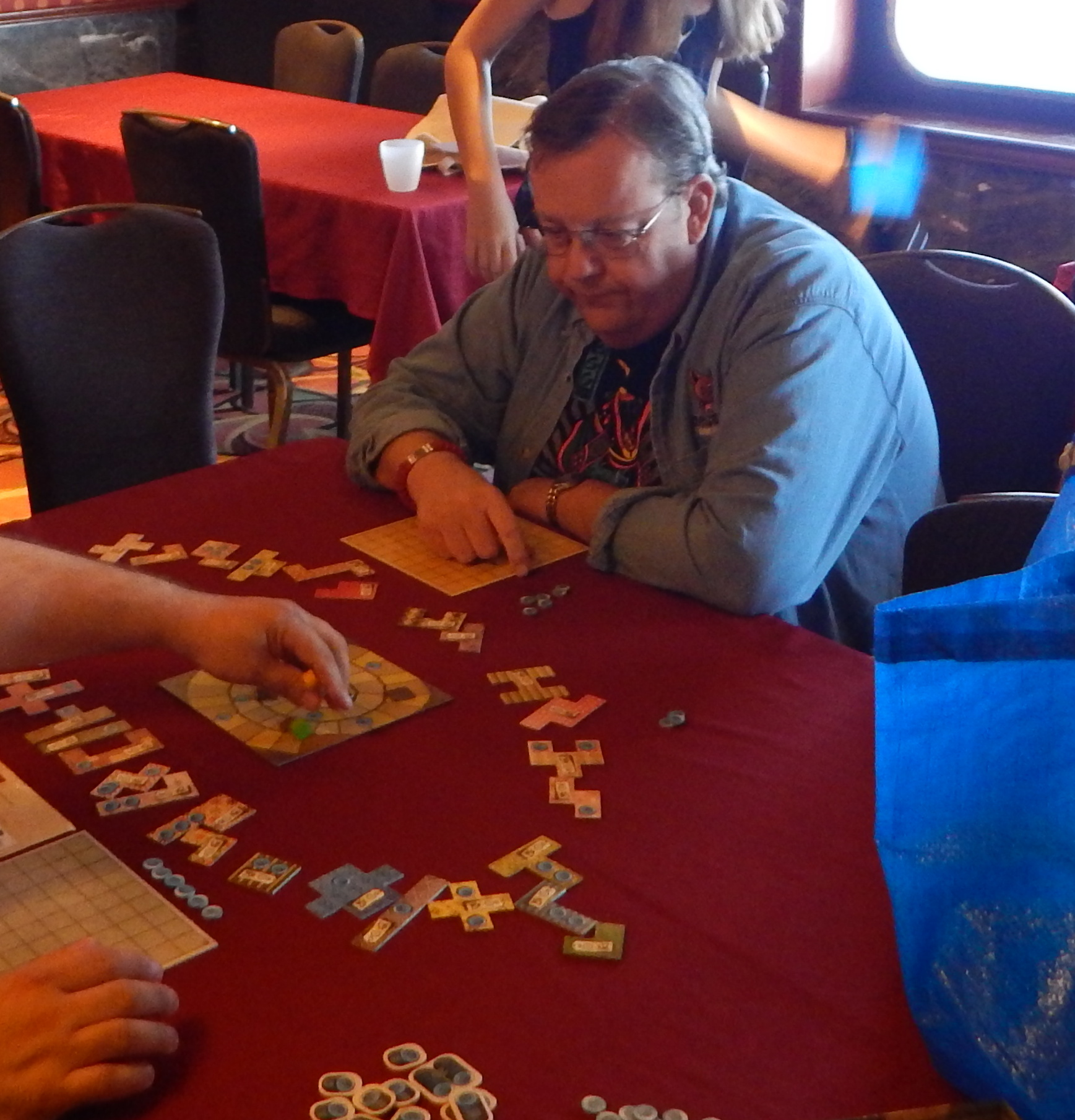
Darwin, playing Patchwork during CrusieCon in March 2015

In 2018, Bromley made a donation, on behalf of himself and his late brother Peter, to The Strong National Museum of Play. It was the single largest donation in the history of the museum.

He served as vice president of the GAMA Trade Show, and in 1990 he received the GAMA Merit of Service award. He died on January 2, 2019, at the age of 68 following a long illness.
