= Archmagic =

1993 role-playing game supplement

Archmagic is a 1993 role-playing game supplement published by Mayfair Games as part of their Role Aids line.

== Contents ==
Archmagic is a boxed set consisting of three books, and is intended as a rules expansion for high level wizard characters to continue progressing.

== Reception ==
Loyd Blankenship reviewed Archmagic in Pyramid #3 (Sept./Oct., 1993), and stated that "While Archmagic is intended for use with AD&D, portions of it will be applicable to your GURPS (or any other) fantasy campaign. The advice on archmage motivations, strategy, etc., are particularly useful for anyone planning a high-powered magical NPC."
