= Ax Battler: A Legend of Golden Axe =

1991 video game

- European cover art by Julie Bell
- Developer: Aspect Co.
- Publisher: Sega
- Programmers: Noriyuki Tabata; Kazuyuki Oikawa
- Composer: Keisuke Tsukahara
- Series: Golden Axe
- Platform: Game Gear
- Release: JP: November 1, 1991; NA: March 1992; PAL: 1992
- Genre: Action-adventure
- Mode: Single-player

Ax Battler: A Legend of Golden Axe (Note: アックスバトラー ゴールデンアックス伝説, Ax Battler: Golden Axe Densetsu) is a 1991 action-adventure game developed by Aspect Co. and published by Sega for the Game Gear. The game is a spin-off of the popular Golden Axe series.

The protagonist is Ax Battler, the male barbarian character from the original Golden Axe game. The series' primary villain, Death Adder, is laying siege to the entire world. He steals the Golden Axe, a magical weapon that grants its wielder unimaginable power, from its hiding place in Firewood Castle. To prevent Death Adder using its powers to destroy the world, the king of Firewood Castle calls upon the help of his strongest warrior: Ax Battler. During his journey, Ax Battler must battle through the following "special landmarks": The Spooky Cave, Peninsula Tower, Turtle's Back, Death Pyramid, Evil Cave, Maze Wood, Gayn Mountain, Eagle's Back, Ice Cliffs and Death Adder's Castle.

== Gameplay ==
Unlike the original side-scrolling beat 'em up Golden Axe games, Ax Battler is divided into three different sections of gameplay:

- Map scene: This mode shows the player's movements in a top-view overworld as he moves across the wilderness. Enemies randomly attack, prompting the game to switch to the below Action Screen.
- Town scene: Similar in appearance to the Map Scenes, except this mode shows the player's actions in a town. The core difference is the ability to talk to NPCs and visit stores.
- Action screen: The game switches to Action Screen when the player encounters an enemy or enters one of the special landmarks. This is a side-scrolling beat 'em up/platform environment.

Ax Battler can collect magic vases, which can be used for his magical attacks or as currency in the towns. He can also learn new attacks in the Training Houses.

Passwords can be collected from the towns to serve as a 'saving' system.

== Reception ==
Reception

Review scores
Publication	Score
Beep! MegaDrive	5.25/10
Electronic Gaming Monthly	7/10, 7/10, 5/10, 6/10
Famitsu	5/10, 5/10, 5/10, 4/10
Games-X	2/5
Mean Machines Sega	39%
VideoGames & Computer Entertainment	8/10
Zero	87/100
Console XS	56/100
Electric Brain	75%
Game Zero Magazine	72.5/100
Game Zone	73/100
Hippon Super!	3/10
MegaZone	78/100
Sega Power	3/5
Sega Pro	77/100

Ax Battler: A Legend of Golden Axe received a 4.5937/10 score in a 1995 readers' poll conducted by the Japanese Sega Saturn Magazine, ranking among Game Gear titles at the number 125 spot. The game received a mixed reception from critics. Zero proclaimed that Ax Battler successfully expanded on the premise of the original games and called it a "surefire winner". Mean Machines Sega called the beat'em up aspect of the game "extremely poor" and called the quest "dull and uninspiring." They compared playing Ax Battler to jumping off a cliff – stating that "one go is more than enough, and isn't really recommended at all".

== See also ==
- Golden Axe Warrior
