= Fez III: Angry Wizard =

Fantasy role-playing game adventure

Fez III: The Angry Wizard
- Character levels: 1-4
- Authors: James Robert and Len Bland
- First published: 1984

Fez III: The Angry Wizard is an adventure for fantasy role-playing games published by Mayfair Games in 1984.

== Contents ==
Fez III: The Angry Wizard is a scenario for character levels 1–4. The wizard Fez transforms the heroes into monsters and sends them on a mission into a pyramid full of tricks and traps.

== Publication history ==
Fez III: The Angry Wizard was written by James Robert and Len Bland, with a cover by David B. Mattingly, and was published by Mayfair Games in 1984 as a 32-page book.
