= Roger Raupp =

American artist

- Born: October 1, 1963; Elkhorn, Wisconsin, U.S.
- Died: December 17, 2019 (aged 56); Bellingham, Washington, U.S.
- Known for: Fantasy art

Roger Raupp (October 1, 1963 in Elkhorn, Wisconsin — December 17, 2019 in Bellingham, Washington) was an artist whose work has appeared in games such as the Dungeons & Dragons fantasy role-playing game from TSR, and the collectible card game Magic: the Gathering from Wizards of the Coast.

== Early life ==
According to Roger Raupp, he "was into science fiction as a kid, but my parents were quite conservative and thought I was a little nuts. They wanted me to work on the farm, not sit around and read comic books and watch Godzilla movies all day." Raupp developed an interest in art during childhood, and began playing the Dungeons & Dragons fantasy role-playing game while in high school. As a freshman, Raupp "was doing some art for a student magazine, which happened to be printed at the same plant where Dragon had camera work done. Tim Kask, who was then the editor of Dragon, happened to see some of my science-fiction and fantasy pieces, and told my art teacher to have me bring in a portfolio." Dave Sutherland reviewed the samples, and told him to keep working; several months later, Raupp got his first assignment for an illustration for Dragon.

== Career ==
Raupp joined the Dragon staff on a part-time basis three years later doing art and cartography, and about a year he was hired full-time. Raupp eventually became the Art Director for Dragon, Strategy & Tactics, and Polyhedron, doing layout, keylining, graphic design, cartography, and some of the art for the magazines. Raupp produced the covers for Avalon Hill's "RuneQuest Renaissance" books.

=== Works ===
Roger Raupp worked as an interior artist for Dungeons & Dragons books including the first edition hardcovers Unearthed Arcana and Oriental Adventures. Raupp also worked as a cover artist for Avalon Hill products, and also produced interior art on products for Mayfair Games, Iron Crown Enterprises, Hero Games, Rubicon Games, Daedalus Games, and Atlas Games, in addition to art for two Magic: the Gathering sets. As Rudy Rauben he published The Medicine Show.

=== Personal life ===
Raupp began "going by the name 'Rudy Didier Rauben'" about a year after WotC acquired TSR, describing it as "more of an AKA scenario", though he'd later refer to it as a "legal name change".

He said in an interview with James Curcio (originally published on Alterati.com), he felt disillusionment about commercialism in art in the gaming industry, "After a year or so of that ... coupled with a brutal divorce, I shaved my head, renounced my vanity, legally changed my name and just wandered off." He also referred to these events describing them as "chaos, divorce, name change, multiple changes of address [...] new website, new artistic directions ... you get the picture."

Rudy Rauben is reported to be dead in 2019.
