= War of Darkness =

Tabletop role-playing game adventure

- Authors: Mark Perry
- First published: 1986

War of Darkness is an adventure for fantasy role-playing games published by Mayfair Games in 1986.

== Contents ==
War of Darkness is an adventure scenario for player characters of levels 12-14 who are sent to reclaim a small fortress from an invading army of evil creatures, but the characters do not know that a greater evil has taken over the caverns below the fortress.

== Publication history ==
War of Darkness was written by Mark Perry, with a cover by Frank Frazetta, and was published by Mayfair Games in 1986 as a 32-page book and a removable cardstock map sheet.
