= Dragons of Weng T'sen =

Tabletop role-playing game adventure

- Authors: Delbert Carr, Jr. and Cheron
- First published: 1983

Dragons of Weng T'sen is an adventure for fantasy role-playing games published by Mayfair Games in 1983.

== Contents ==
Dragons of Weng T'senis a scenario for character levels 6-9 with an Oriental setting. Violent storms and terrible monsters have been issuing from the forbidden valley of a powerful wizard; the heroes are hired to enter the valley and put a stop to them.

== Publication history ==
Dragons of Weng T'senwas written by Delbert Carr, Jr. and Cheron, with a cover by Judith Mitchell and illustrations by David A. Cherry, and was published by Mayfair Games in 1983 as a 32-page book.
