= Beneath Two Suns =

Fantasy role-playing game adventure

- Character levels: 6-8
- Authors: Troy Denning
- First published: 1986

Beneath Two Suns is an adventure for fantasy role-playing games published by Mayfair Games in 1986.

== Plot summary ==
Beneath Two Suns is a science-fantasy adventure scenario intended for player characters of levels 6 – 8 that takes place on the planet Kregen from the "Dray Prescott" novels by Alan Burt Akers. The adventure is set in a port reminiscent to Renaissance era Italian cities. The characters try to save a kidnapped princess and become involved in the intrigues between noble houses. The adventure contains statistics for the characters from the "Dray Prescott" novels as well as rules for the Florentine style of fighting with a sword in the right hand and a dagger in the left hand.

Benath Two Suns supplies player characters of various backgrounds such as Victorian London. The adventure begins with characters becoming trapped in a sort of limbo, and they awaken in chains on the world of Kregen being forced to break rocks in a quarry. The adventure includes notes from the novels about the culture and wildlife of the planet. Most of the adventure is presented in a format similar to that of a gamebook.

== Publication history ==
Beneath Two Suns was written by Troy Denning, with a cover by Ken Kelly and illustrations by Todd Hamilton, and was published by Mayfair Games in 1986 as a 32-page book.

== Reception ==
Graeme Davis reviewed Beneath Two Suns for White Dwarf #90. He admitted that he had read a couple of the Prescott books, but "wasn't particularly struck by them; hardened fans may well get more out of this adventure than I did". He calls the adventure "a complicated piece of skullduggery, as can be seen from the daunting-looking flowchart at the front". He found that the gamebook-like format "may restrict the party's possible actions uncomfortably. Having said that, though, there is a nice balance between fighting and role-playing [...] especially if the GM is prepared to put in a bit of preparation work and wing it if the party get away from the expected plot."
