= Demons (Mayfair Games) =

1992 role-playing supplement published by Mayfair Games

Demons is a 1992 role-playing supplement published by Mayfair Games.

== Contents ==
Demons is a supplement in which rules and statistics are given for including demons and their home dimension of Infernus in an Advanced Dungeons & Dragons campaign.

== Publication history ==
Shannon Appelcline noted that after demons and devils had been removed from AD&D, "Mayfair's new Role Aids line kicked off with Demons (1992). It was followed by over a half-dozen books (1992–1993), most of them demonic monster manuals but also including Apocalypse (1993), a campaign-ending adventure by Jonathan Tweet [...] TSR did not allow Mayfair to advertise their new Role Aids books in Dragon magazine but sales were nonetheless strong." Appelcline noted that TSR soon reopened a legal dispute with Mayfair starting with their publication of City-State of the Invincible Overlord and that "Mayfair's publication of Demons had probably cranked up the importance of the case, since it went in the face of TSR's attempts to make their game more 'mother friendly'; as a result, Demons eventually showed up in the legal proceedings, with TSR's chief argument there being that the gold Role Aids logo was not high contrast enough."

== Reception ==
A. L. McCoy reviewed Demons in White Wolf #36 (1993), rating it a 3 out of 5 and stated that "Demon's most debilitating failure [...] is in the history of Infernus, the gods, and the demons. With its detailed delineation of the origins of humanity, this history unnecessarily places restrictions on the gamemaster. A greater level of ambiguity and mystery with regard to the 'bigger picture' would have been more useful to a wider audience."

== Reviews ==
- The Scroll (Issue 12 – Jan 1993)
- ZauberZeit (Issue 38 – Jul 1993)
- Pyramid
