= Wilderlands of the Magic Realm =

Role-playing game supplement

- Genre: Role-playing game
- Publisher: Judges Guild
- Media type: Print
- Preceded by: Fantastic Wilderlands Beyonde
- Followed by: Wilderlands of the Fantastic Reaches
- Judges Guild Product Code: [JG 92]

Wilderlands of the Magic Realm is a supplement for fantasy role-playing games published by Judges Guild in 1980. (JG 92)

== Contents ==
Wilderlands of the Magic Realm is a campaign setting supplement which details over 300 island locations found on four large wilderness maps of the sea (Wilderlands Maps 11-14).

The regions of Ghinor (#11), the Isles of the Blest (#12), the Ebony Coast (#13), and Ament Tundra (#14) are shown in full detail on the judge's maps and are roughly sketched out on the players' maps. The booklet describes and gives the location of many of the villages, castles, islands, ruins, relics, and monsters.

== Publication history ==
Wilderlands of the Magic Realm was written by Mark Holmer with Bob Bledsaw, with a cover by Jennell Jaquays (Note: Credited as Paul Jaquays.), and was published by Judges Guild in 1980 as a 48-page book and four large maps.
