= Lich Lords =

Role-playing game

- Authors: Lynn Sellers
- First published: 1985

Lich Lords is an adventure for fantasy role-playing games published by Mayfair Games in 1985.

== Contents ==
Lich Lords is an adventure scenario designed for player characters of levels 12-16 who explore the catacombs found among the buried city of Ool, and must assist a group of liches to overthrow their king. The adventure includes new rules for the wish spell, as well as high-level magic, and liches.

== Publication history ==
Lich Lords was written by Lynn Sellers, with a cover by Frank Frazetta, and was published by Mayfair Games in 1985 as a 32-page book with a removable cardstock map screen.

== Reception ==
Lawrence Schick, in his book Heroic Worlds called the adventure "Nice work if you can get it."
