= Demons II =

Supplement for Role Aids

Demons II is a 1993 role-playing supplement published by Mayfair Games.

== Contents ==
Demons II is a supplement in which the activities of demons on the mortal plane are detailed.

== Reception ==
Gene Alloway reviewed Demons II in White Wolf #37 (July/Aug., 1993), rating it a 4 out of 5 and stated that "Demons II is the best source for running demons in a AD&D campaign bar none. It is a mature look at a complex group of evil powers and can add a great deal of depth and adventure to a gaming world. It will take some time to wade through, but it is worth the effort. Mayfair has really done TSR a favor here. It has tackled a difficult subject well, with the right approach and professionalism the topic needs. Mayfair and Kevin Hassall have also provided AD&D GM's with an essential resource."
