= Denizens of Vecheron =

Denizens of Vecheron is a 1992 role-playing supplement published by Mayfair Games.

== Contents ==
Denizens of Vecheron is a supplement in which the political hierarchy is explored for the demons of Infernus.

== Reception ==
A. L. McCoy reviewed Denizens of Vecheron in White Wolf #36 (1993), rating it a 3 out of 5 and stated that "What seems to be missing are more adventure ideas, more information on the landscape of Infernus, and a readable organizational chart of the political hierarchy of the demons. Page numbers and an index would have been a welcome addition as well. Despite providing a stomachful of tasty demons, this supplement left me wanting more."
