= How to Lose a Battle =

2006 book anthology

How to Lose a Battle: Foolish Plans and Great Military Blunders
- Editor: Bill Fawcett
- Language: English
- Genre: Non-fiction
- Publisher: HarperCollins
- Publication date: 2006

How to Lose a Battle: Foolish Plans and Great Military Blunders is a book published in 2006.

== Contents ==
How To Lose A Battle is a collection containing brief essays by various contributors that "chart the course of military disasters from the crushing defeat of Darius of Persia at Arbela in 331 BC to the 1954 slaughter of the French forces at Dien Bien Phu in Vietnam."

== Publication history ==
How To Lose A Battle was published by HarperCollins, and edited by Bill Fawcett.

== Reception ==
Nick Baumann of Commonweal comments: "The strength of the anthology is that every essay manages to be concise and fast-paced without sacrificing narrative drama. If we hope to make the right decisions about Iraq, we must understand why some battles are lost when they might have been won. Fawcett excels in offering the reader an understanding of these historical debacles."

The Historical Novel Society did not give the book a favorable review, noting several errors and pointing out that the book is a collection of essays by authors of unknown reputation.
