= Apocalypse (Mayfair Games) =

1993 role-playing game supplement

Apocalypse is a 1993 role-playing supplement published by Mayfair Games.

== Contents ==
Apocalypse is a supplement in which information is given on how to run an apocalypse as part of a campaign.

== Publication history ==
Shannon Appelcline noted that after demons and devils had been removed from AD&D, "Mayfair's new Role Aids line kicked off with Demons (1992). It was followed by over a half-dozen books (1992–1993), most of them demonic monster manuals but also including Apocalypse (1993), a campaign-ending adventure by Jonathan Tweet [...] TSR did not allow Mayfair to advertise their new Role Aids books in Dragon magazine but sales were nonetheless strong."

== Reception ==
Gene Alloway reviewed Apocalypse in White Wolf #44 (June, 1994), rating it a 5 out of 5 and stated that "Apocalypse is a good value [...] there is nothing like it on the market. It supplies everything you need to plan both major and minor Gotterdamerungen. The concepts are excellent, options plentiful and presentation well done. Buy this (assuming you can find it now that Mayfair has let go of Role Aids)."
