= Making Contact (book) =

1998 book

Making Contact: A Serious Handbook for Locating and Communicating With Extraterrestrials
- Title page for Making Contact: A Serious Handbook for Locating and Communicating With Extraterrestrials (1997)
- Editor: Bill Fawcett
- Language: English
- Genre: Non-fiction
- Publisher: HarperCollins
- Publication date: 1997
- ISBN: 978-0-688-14486-9

Making Contact: A Serious Handbook for Locating and Communicating With Extraterrestrials is a book published in 1997.

== Contents ==
Making Contact discusses all aspects of close encounters with extraterrestrials. Editor Bill Fawcett said their existence is "unquestionable". The book includes explanations of signs and symptoms of an alien abduction, such as burns, tinnitus, a metallic taste in the mouth, and double vision. Particular locations, such as Area 51 and Mexico City, are described as giving the best chance of an encounter.
