= Blasted Land =

Role-playing game supplement

- Authors: Mark Mulkins and Paul Karczag
- First published: 1983

Blasted Land is an adventure for fantasy role-playing games published by Mayfair Games in 1983.

== Contents ==
Blasted Land is an adventure scenario in which the player characters cross the desert from Latoon and discover the three keys needed to enter the Tower of Stars, and will need to fight through its defenders so they can close a magical portal in the tower.

== Publication history ==
Blasted Land was written by Mark Mulkins and Paul Karczag, and was published by Mayfair Games in 1983 as a 28-page book with an outer folder. A tournament scenario, Blasted Land was produced in a limited edition of 1,000 copies for Dallcon in 1983.
