= Wake Island (wargame) =

1981 American Civil War wargame

- Designers: Kenneth Kaufman
- Publishers: Mayfair Games
- Publication: 1981
- Genres: World War II

Wake Island is a board wargame published by Mayfair Games in 1981 that simulates the attack by Japanese forces on the American-held Wake Island during World War II.

== Background ==
Before the start of World War II, Wake Island was a desolate atoll only used as a refueling stop by Pan-Am Airways. In 1941, the United States, alarmed by Japanese militaristic expansion in the Pacific, built a military base on the atoll manned by elements of the U.S. Marine Corps, as well as a squadron of Grumman F4F-3 Wildcats of the Marine Fighter Squadron 221. Work on the military base and hangars was incomplete when the Japanese attacked Pearl Harbor on 7 December 1941. The next day, a Japanese task force launched a bombing raid on Wake Island, followed a few days later by an amphibious assault.

== Description ==
Wake Island is a board wargame for 2 players, where one player controls Japanese forces, while the other controls American defenders.

=== Components ===
The game has a 17" x 22" hex grid map of the island and the surrounding ocean, 100 counters, a 10-page rule book, and several charts and players' aids.

=== Gameplay ===
The point of the game for the American player is to hold out as long as possible in the face of superior Japanese forces. Conversely, the Japanese player attempts to take the island as soon as possible.

The game uses a traditional "I Go, You Go" system, where the Japanese player moves and attacks first, followed by the American player. Counters are double-sided — if a unit is disrupted by combat, it is flipped over. A second disruption result eliminates the unit.

The game has 17 game turns, each representing one day between 8 December and 24 December. Each day is further divided into 8 segments of 3 hours. (The three night-time segments — 2100h, 2400h and 0300h — have special rules, including no air combat.)

The Japanese player can only conduct bombing raids for the first three game turns. Once this time has passed, if the initial Japanese force proves insufficient to establish a beachhead, further Japanese reinforcements do not become available for another 7 game turns.

=== Victory conditions ===
The American player receives Victory Points for eliminating Japanese units, and for each day that the atoll remains in American hands. The Japanese player must take Wake Island as quickly as possible with a minimal number of losses to minimize American Victory Points. If the American points reach a Victory threshold, the American player wins. If American points do not achieve that threshold, the Japanese player wins.

== Strategy ==
Critic Jack Ford pointed out that an American Headquarters unit gives protection against disruption to nearby units, and suggested the American player must use these units wisely. He also felt the American player must try to defend as much of the island as possible "abandoning positions only when forced to do so."

== Publication history ==
Mayfair Games was founded in 1981, and one of its first games was Wake Island, designed by Kenneth Kaufman.

== Reception ==
In Issue 23 of The Wargamer, Roger Musson pointed out "The rules are an attempt to produce a very simple game system that still incorporates the three distinct arms: land, sea and air. This is quite ambitious." Despite this, Musson found the rules "concise and reasonably clear." Musson concluded, "For the general wargamer, this is a neat quick-paced (when the action gets going) game which is certainly worth playing."

Writing for the Australian game magazine Queensland Wargamer, Jack Ford found the game "highly enjoyable, balanced and with a simple rules system." But Ford complained about the extra bombardment opportunity given to the Japanese starting on the December 21 turn that was, for the first time in the game, not subject to counterfire from the Americans because it was coming from Japanese battleships that were off the map and out of range of the American guns. Ford felt that the ability of the Japanese player to destroy remaining American units with this artillery fire was historically inaccurate since long-range naval bombardments against land targets by both sides during the Pacific campaign proved to be highly ineffective.
