= Julie Bell =

American artist (born 1958)

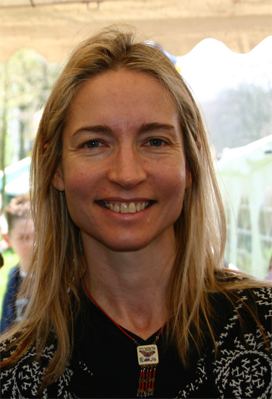
- Bell in April 2005
- Born: October 21, 1958 (age 67); Beaumont, Texas, U.S.
- Spouse: Boris Vallejo
- Website: borisjulie.com

Julie Bell (born October 21, 1958) is an American fine artist, illustrator, photographer, bodybuilder and wildlife painter. Bell is also a fantasy artist and a representative of the heroic fantasy and fantastic realism genres. Bell has won Chesley Awards and was the designer of the Dragons of Destiny series. She also won first place awards in the Art Renewal Center International Salon, which bestowed on her the title "ARC Living Master".

== Early life ==
Bell was born on October 21, 1958, in Beaumont, Texas. She attended five different high schools, studying painting and drawing.

In her youth, she was fond of bodybuilding. She took part in various competitions and received national recognition, which later influenced her to portray beautiful and muscular women. In 1978, Bell married writer and academic Donald E. Palumbo. During their eleven-year marriage, she gave birth to two sons, Anthony and David Palumbo, who subsequently also became professional artists. In 1989, she met Boris Vallejo, whom she later married.

== Career ==
Bell has painted the cover illustrations of more than 100 fantasy and science fiction books and magazines since 1990.

In the early 1990s, she illustrated painted covers for video games as well as best-selling trading cards for the superheroes of Marvel and DC. A cover art image from the Sega Game Gear video game Ax Battler: A Legend of Golden Axe would depict the semi-barbaric world that the game took place in; thus being entitled Savage Land by Bell herself. She designed the Dragons of Destiny sculpture series, Mistress of the Dragon's Realm dagger series, as well as the Temptation Rides sculpture series produced by The Franklin Mint. Her art was also featured in the 1995 card game Hyborian Gates.

She designed the cover art for Meat Loaf's 2006 album Bat Out of Hell III: The Monster Is Loose as well as its first single "It's All Coming Back to Me Now".

In 2007, Bell and Vallejo illustrated the poster for Aqua Teen Hunger Force Colon Movie Film for Theaters.

In the 2012-2013 Art Renewal Center (ARC) International Salon, Bell won "the most awards in any one competition ARC has ever held", including First Place in the Imaginative Realist Category, First and Third Place in the Animal Category, Best Portrait Runner Up, two purchase awards, and two additional honorable mentions. It was in 2013 that Bell was awarded the aforementioned "Living Master" title by ARC, that organization's highest artist designation.

In November 2015, she was awarded the Mountain Oyster Club's Denise McCalla Memorial Top Choice Award.

Bell shares her studio in Pennsylvania with her husband, renowned fantasy artist Boris Vallejo.

== Honors ==
- Art Renewal Center, multiple 1st place awards and honorable mentions.

== Books ==
- The Julie Bell Portfolio (1994)
- Hard Curves: The Fantasy Art of Julie Bell (1995), with Hank Rose and Nigel Suckling
- Soft As Steel: The Art of Julie Bell (1999), with Brian Aldiss and Suckling
- Titans: The Heroic Visions of Boris Vallejo and Julie Bell (2000), with Suckling, Bell, and Vallejo; also issued 2000 with main title Superheroes
- Sketchbook (2001), with Suckling, Bell, and Vallejo
- Twin Visions (2002), with Bell and Vallejo
- Fantasy Workshop: A Practical Guide: The Painting Techniques of Boris Vallejo and Julie Bell (2003), with Bell and Vallejo
- Boris Vallejo/Julie Bell: The Ultimate Collection (2005), with Suckling, Bell, and Vallejo
- The Fantasy of Flowers (2006), with Bell and Vallejo
- The Fabulous Women of Boris Vallejo and Julie Bell (2006), with David Palumbo, Anthony Palumbo, Bell, and Vallejo
- Imaginistix: The Art of Boris Vallejo and Julie Bell (2007), with Palumbo, Palumbo, Bell, and Vallejo
- Boris Vallejo and Julie Bell: The Ultimate illustrations (2009), with Bell and Vallejo
- Dreamland: The Fantastic Worlds of Boris Vallejo and Julie Bell (2014), with Bell and Vallejo
