= Australian Rails =

Australian Rails is a 1994 board game published by Mayfair Games.

== Gameplay ==
Australian Rails is a game in which players take on the role of rail magnates competing to build and operate a profitable train network across the Australian continent. Using crayons to draw rail lines directly on a plastic-coated map, each player carves out routes that connect major cities—Perth and three of Brisbane, Sydney, Melbourne, or Adelaide—while racing to accumulate $250 million in earnings. Terrain plays a strategic role: building over mountains and rivers costs more, while desert mileposts are cheap, but vulnerable to sandstorms that can erase them from the map. Dry lakes and riverbeds may flood during the rainy season, increasing construction costs mid-game. Players draw cards featuring delivery runs, each with three options, and must choose which goods to transport—ranging from diamonds to aboriginal artifacts. The further the delivery, the greater the payout. Early gameplay centers on claiming efficient routes, while later phases demand careful decisions about reinvestment versus saving for victory.

== Reception ==
In the October 1994 edition of Pyramid (Issue #9), Scott Haring complimented Australian Rails, saying that both this game "and its brothers don't have the romantic thrills of other games -- there are no armies to defeat, no damsels to rescue, no dragons to slay. But it's a great strategic game, requiring brains and planning to win. And in my opinion, it's every bit as satisfying to survey a well-planned rail network and to count the earnings as it is to plant your foot on the belly of a slain dragon and count its gold. Every bit."

At the 1995 Origins Awards, Australian Rails won Best Modern-Day Boardgame of 1994.
