= Dragons (Mayfair Games) =

1986 role-playing game supplement by Cory Glaberson

- Cover
- Author: Cory Glaberson
- Genre: Role-playing game
- Publisher: Mayfair Games
- Publication date: 1986
- Media type: Print
- Pages: 96

Dragons is a supplement for fantasy role-playing games published by Mayfair Games in 1986.

== Contents ==
Dragons includes three linked miniscenarios for character levels 6-9 involving a war between good and evil dragons. It includes supplementary material on dragons, their biology, clans and culture; a campaign setting description of the Dragonlands; and rules for Dragonlords, a subclass of fighters.

== Publication history ==
Dragons was written by Cory Glaberson, with a cover by Dawn Wilson, and was published by Mayfair Games in 1986 as a 96-page book.

== Reception ==
Ken Rolston reviewed Dragons for Dragon magazine #133 (May 1988). He commented: "Given the popularity and money-drawing of dragons as a fantasy feature, it's surprising how few decent treatments of dragons have been produced for FRP games. This supplement is exceptional, with lots of detail on dragon statistics, biology, and culture, all with an original campaign setting and three adventures. Glaberson's version of dragons and dragon-riders is distinctive and idiosyncratic, and may not fit with many established campaigns. But compared to the relatively drab and generic dragons of most FRP systems, it may be worth adapting your campaign to fit this supplement."

== Reviews ==
- Isaac Asimov's Science Fiction Magazine v10 n11 (1986 11)
