= Fez I: Valley of Trees =

Tabletop role-playing game supplement

- Authors: Len Bland and James Robert
- First published: 1982

Fez I: Valley of Trees is an adventure for fantasy role-playing games published by Mayfair Games in 1982.

== Contents ==
Fez I: Valley of Trees is a three-round tournament adventure scenario in which the player characters will need to retrieve several magic items for Fez the Wizard and awaken him out of a magical sleep, then assist him in killing the dragon Scarsnout.

Fez I: Valley of Trees is a tournament-style adventure intended to be used with a team of players with pre-generated player characters that can be modified by the DM to fit into an existing campaign. The characters must fulfill several different prophecies so that they can kill an evil dragon. The characters begin the adventure by being raised from the dead, and they discover that they are all suffering from partial amnesia making a simple task very challenging. The central character is a time-travelling wizard named Fez who tries to make prophesies come true.

== Publication history ==
Fez I: Valley of Trees was written by Len Bland and James Robert, and was published by Mayfair Games in 1982 as a 40-page book with an outer folder and a cover sheet.

Mayfair Games began its Role Aids game line by publishing Beastmaker Mountain (1982), Nanorien Stones (1982) and Fez I (1982).

Fez I: Wizard's Vale is its revised version, published in 1987.

== Reception ==
Kelly Grimes and Aaron Allston reviewed Fez I in The Space Gamer #58. They noted that the adventure "seems more adaptable to other game systems than some such adventures". They commented: "The adventure is different from most modules on the market because the players are not told anything about their characters beyond their names and some scraps of their memories. The DM, of course, has the complete information on the characters, the quest, the prophesies, and so on. Detail on the adventurer's background is good, but not cumbersome. Intelligent players will also be able to figure out a good deal about their characters from the initial hints, and will be able to put more pieces together to better flesh out the characters by the adventure's end." Grimes and Allston concluded the review by discussing some of the adventure's flaws: "At the adventure's end, Fez is supposed to claim four of the magic items the party has found; unfortunately, the text doesn't say which ones or whether it makes a difference in the next adventure. One castle which the characters visit was once inhabited by a wizardly practical joker; once again we get a splash of silliness. It's really too difficult an adventure for novice DMs or players. However, it's a good package, and experienced players should enjoy it."

Lawrence Schick, in his book Heroic Worlds says: "The Fez series is sort of humorous and includes lots of problem-solving. Also suitable with for use with D&D and T&T, supposedly."
