= I.C.B.M. (board game) =

- Artwork by Darch Clampitt
- Designers: Neil Zimmerer
- Illustrators: Darch Clampitt
- Publishers: Mayfair Games
- Publication: 1981
- Genres: Cold War

I.C.B.M. is a board wargame published by Mayfair Games in 1981 that simulates a nuclear war.

== Description ==
I.C.B.M. is a two-player wargame in which players try to obliterate their opponent with nuclear weapons while somehow surviving a retaliatory strike.

=== Components ===
The game, packaged in a ziplock bag, includes a 17" x 21" map (a polar projection showing the U.S.S.R. and North America, with major cities and their values), 108 counters and an 8-page rule booklet.

== Gameplay ==
I.C.B.M. is a game that involves warfare using intercontinental missiles and ABMs.

== Publication history ==
In the late 1970s, science fiction and fantasy "microgames" packaged in ziplock bags and small plastic boxes were very good sellers for companies such as Metagaming Concepts. In 1981, Mayfair Games decided to enter this market with a number of microgames, one of them being I.C.B.M., designed by Neil Zimmerer, with artwork by Darch Clampitt.

== Reception ==
In Issue 43 of The Space Gamer, William A. Barton commented "I.C.B.M. is nuclear war stripped to the bare necessities — intercontinental nuclear missiles and ABMs ...rules are brief, easy to understand, and clean." Barton concluded, "I.C.B.M. is an impressive offering for a new small company and a good beginning level simulation for those who like to reduce their opponents to so much nuclear dust."

In Issue 28 of the British games magazine White Dwarf, Michael Polling stated, "As a game it is unsatisfactory: claiming victory is academic when your country has been wiped out. And for US buyers it may well have the effect of endorsing Reagan's arms build-up, encouraging players unknowingly to support escalation." Polling concluded by giving the game a rating of 4 out of 10.

In Issue 13 of Simulacrum, Joe Scoleri called I.C.B.M. "a simple beer and pretzels game. But if you are looking for nuke wargame-lite, it pales in comparison to the classic [beer & pretzels] card game Nuclear War from Flying Buffalo."

== Awards ==
At the 1981 Charles S. Roberts Awards, I.C.B.M. was a finalist in the category "Best Initial Release".
