= Viking Gods =

Board game

Viking Gods is a 1982 board game published by TSR.

== Gameplay ==
Viking Gods is a two-player game about Ragnarok, in which one player as the Gods will need to either kill Loki or defeat the army of Chaos, while the other player as Chaos will need to destroy Yggdrasil to win.

== Reception ==
George R. Leake III reviewed Viking Gods in The Space Gamer No. 61. Leake commented that "Despite many flaws in this game, it provides good entertainment for fans of Viking lore. It is inexpensive, and at least the components are durable and attractive. But if you find fantasy and mythology-oriented games unappealing, you should spend your [money] elsewhere."

In a retrospective review of Viking Gods in Black Gate, Ty Johnston said "Designed by Allen Hammack, Viking Gods proved a lot of fun, but that's to be expected from a game designer involved with early Dungeons & Dragons, especially Hammack's work on the game module The Ghost Tower of Inverness. And with cover art by Jim Holloway, Viking Gods really stood out on store shelves."
