= Daniel Greenberg (game designer) =

Game designer

Daniel Greenberg is a video game and role-playing game designer and author. He has worked with publishing companies such as Palladium Books, Mayfair Games, Pulsar Games, and Last Unicorn Games, but probably most extensively with White Wolf on supplements to the Vampire: The Masquerade and other storyteller games. He has also written scripts for numerous video games, including: X-Men: The Mutant Wars, Vampire: The Masquerade - Redemption, Tenchu 2: Birth Of The Stealth Assassins, Star Control 3, Star Trek: Starfleet Academy, and many others, including educational titles for The Walt Disney Company.
