= Beastmaker Mountain =

Tabletop role-playing game supplement

- Authors: William Fawcett
- First published: 1982

Beastmaker Mountain is an adventure for fantasy role-playing games published by Mayfair Games in 1982.

== Plot summary ==
Beastmaker Mountain is a scenario in which the player characters investigate the abandoned villa of the wizard Orlow the Beastmaker and the caverns beneath. The adventure can be played as a single game or as part of an existing campaign. The player characters start in a partially deserted village, where they find out that Beastmaker Mountain is the former home of a wizard who specialized in creating unique creatures. When the magic-user disappeared, his wife cursed the mountain to draw evil creatures to it and left to find him.

Tower of Magicks is the sequel.

The adventure is suitable for use with Advanced Dungeons & Dragons, Dungeons & Dragons and Tunnels & Trolls.

== Publication history ==
Beastmaker Mountain was written by William Fawcett, and was published by Mayfair Games in 1982 as a 32-page book with an outer folder and a cover sheet.

When Mayfair Games got into the RPG field, the company began its Role Aids game line by publishing Beastmaker Mountain (1982).

== Reception ==
In Issue 20 of Abyss, Dave Nalle commented, "The adventure is generally well organized, but I missed any introductory note or preface for the GM. ... the background material is also sort of poorly organized, and probably would have to be read a couple of times before actually running the adventure. Generally it is well put-together though." Nalle concluded, "Perhaps in the sequels [designer Bill] Fawcett will consider going into the less familiar but more imaginative realms of social and interactive adventure."

Kelly Grimes and Aaron Allston reviewed Beastmaker Mountain in The Space Gamer #58. They described it as "a hero's adventure" but noted that it was not "a hack-'n-slash adventure of mismatches monsters, secret doors, and treasure strewn willy-nilly about a dungeon; Beastmaker Mountain was constructed with both sense and logic. An extensive amount of work has gone to detail. Monsters and treasures are placed logically and in the context of the area's rationale." They added: "The adventure has few flaws. There are occasional outbreaks of silliness [...] but all these do is alter the tone of the adventure somewhat and can be worked around." Grimes and Allston concluded the review by saying: "All in all, the adventure is of good quality and excellent playability. It makes for a challenge and an enjoyable time".
