= Bill Fawcett (writer) =

American writer and game designer (born 1947)

Bill Fawcett, writer, editor and game designer, at Dragon Con in Atlanta Ga September 5 2026

William B. Fawcett (born May 13, 1947) is an American editor, anthologist, game designer, book packager, fiction writer, and historian.

== Life ==
Fawcett and fellow science fiction writer Jody Lynn Nye were married in 1987. They first met at a science fiction convention in 1985. At that time, Fawcett owned a gaming company in Niles, Illinois, and Nye began to work as a freelance writer for the company.

== Career ==
Bill Fawcett was one of the players in early Dungeons & Dragons games being played in the Chicago and Milwaukee areas, using photocopied prototypes of the rules handed out by Gary Gygax. Darwin Bromley brought Fawcett on as a partner in Mayfair Games soon after the company was formed in 1980, and they worked together to design the game Empire Builder (1980). As a veteran role-playing gamer, Fawcett got Mayfair involved in the RPG field, and the company kicked off its Role Aids line with Beastmaker Mountain (1982). Fawcett was friends with Robert Asprin and Lynn Abbey, and FASA was able to leverage their connection with Mayfair to obtain a license to publish Thieves' World role-playing game adventures from 1982–1984. Fawcett and Jordan Weisman designed the robot arena fighting game Combots (1983) for FASA.

Fawcett produced the Crossroads books (1987–1988), a series of licensed gamebooks published by Tor. He also authored the short-lived SwordQuest gamebooks series. He edited the book The War Years 1: The Far Stars War (1990). With David Drake, he co-edited The Fleet series (1988-1991), as well as its sequels, Battlestation, Book One (1992), and Battlestation, Book Two: Vanguard (1993). As a book packager, Fawcett was able to arrange a publishing deal between Wizards of the Coast and HarperCollins for novels set in the Magic: The Gathering multiverse of Dominia; the first novel in this series was Arena (1994).

His 2008 book, "Oval Office Oddities," was described as "Chock-full of information—trivia, anecdotes, charts, illustrations, etc." and focused on the lives of American presidents and their wives.

== Works ==
Fawcett and Chelsea Quinn Yarbro write mystery novels together under the pen name Quinn Fawcett. Fawcett was also a field historian for the Navy SEAL museum in Fort Pierce, Florida, and has co-authored work on the US Navy Seals in Vietnam.

=== As writer ===
- Cold Cash Warrior: Combat Command in the World of Robert Asprin's Cold Cash War (with Robert Asprin) (1989)

==== Mistakes in History series ====
- Trust Me, I Know What I'm Doing
- 100 Mistakes That Changed History
- Men At War
- It Seemed Like A Good Idea
- How To Lose A War At Sea
- Doomed To Repeat
- How To Lose WWII
- How To Lose The Civil War
- Hunters And Shooters
- How To Lose A War
- It Looked Good On Paper
- Oval Office Oddities: An Irreverent Collection of Presidential Facts, Follies and Foibles
- You Said What?
- How To Lose A Battle
- You Did What? Mad Plans and Great Historical Disasters (with Brian Thomsen) (2004)

==== SwordQuest series ====
- SwordQuest: Quest for the Unicorn's Horn (1985)
- SwordQuest: Quest for the Dragon's Eye (1985)
- SwordQuest: Quest for the Demon Gate (1986)
- SwordQuest: Quest for the Elf King (1987)

==== Short-stories ====
- "Lincoln's Charge" (1992) (collected in Mike Resnick's anthology Alternate Presidents)
- "Zealot" (1993) (collected in Resnick's anthology Alternate Warriors)
- "Through the Dragon's Eye" (1994) (collected in Christopher Stasheff's anthology Dragon's Eye)
- "The Last Crusader" (1998) (collected in Harry Turtledove's anthology Alternate Generals)

=== As editor ===
- Crafter I (with Christopher Stasheff) (1991)
- Gods of War (1992)
- The Fleet anthology series (with David Drake)
  - The Fleet: The Fleet (1987) aka The Fleet, Book 1
  - The Fleet: Counter Attack (1988) aka The Fleet, Book 2
  - The Fleet: Breakthrough (1989) aka The Fleet, Book 3
  - The Fleet: Sworn Allies (1990) aka The Fleet, Book 4
  - The Fleet: Total war (1990) aka The Fleet, Book 5
  - The Fleet: Crisis (1991) aka The Fleet, Book 6
- Battlestations anthology series — sequel to The Fleet anthology series
  - Battlestation (with David Drake) (1992); aka Battlestation I
  - Battlestation II (with Christopher Stasheff) (1993); aka Battlestation: Vanguard
  - Battlestations (2011); omnibus edition of Battlestation I and Battlestation II
- The Teams: An Oral History of the U.S. Navy SEALs with Kevin Dockery (1998)
- Making Contact: A Serious Handbook for Locating and Communicating With Extraterrestrials (1998)
- The Warmasters (2002)
- Masters of Fantasy (with Brian Thomsen) (2004)
- We Three Dragons: A Trio of Dragon Tales for the Holiday Season (2005)
- The Battle for Azeroth: Adventure, Alliance and Addiction in the 'World of Warcraft' (2006)
- Liftport: Opening Space to Everyone (2006)
- Nebula Awards Showcase 2010 (2010)
- Mooney, J. E. & Bill Fawcett (eds.). Shadows of the New Sun: stories in honor of Gene Wolfe. Tor.
