= Boris Vallejo =

Peruvian-American painter (born 1941)

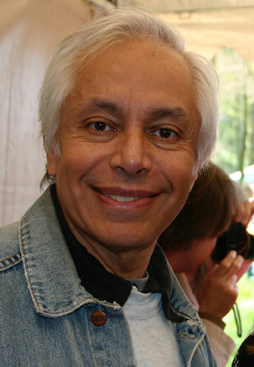
- Vallejo in April 2005
- Born: January 8, 1941 (age 85); Lima, Peru
- Education: Escuela Nacional Superior Autónoma de Bellas Artes
- Known for: Illustration, painting
- Notable work: The Amazon Princess and her Pet, National Lampoon's Vacation (poster), Tarzan calendar (1978)
- Style: Fantasy art, science fiction art, erotica
- Spouse: Julie Bell
- Awards: Inkpot Award (1978), British Fantasy Award (1979), Locus Award (1979), Chesley Awards (2011, 2014)
- Website: borisjulie.com

Boris Vallejo (born January 8, 1941) is a Peruvian-American painter who works in the science fiction, fantasy, and erotica genres. His hyper-representational paintings have appeared on the covers of numerous novels in the science fiction, sword and sorcery, and fantasy fiction genres, along with album covers for musical groups in addition to movie posters and other media. His art is also sold through a series of annual calendars.

== Early life and education ==
Vallejo was born in 1941 in Lima, Peru. He began painting at the age of 13. In 1954, he obtained his first illustration job. Three years later, in 1957, at the age of 16, he attended Escuela Nacional Superior Autónoma de Bellas Artes on a five-year scholarship, where he was awarded a prize medal.

== Career ==
After emigrating to the United States in 1964, at the age of 23, he quickly garnered a fan following from his illustrations of Tarzan, Conan the Barbarian, Doc Savage, and various other fantasy characters (often done for paperback-fiction works featuring the characters). This led to commissions for movie-poster illustration, advertisement illustration, and artwork for various collectibles, including Franklin Mint paraphernalia, trading cards, and sculpture. Along with his wife Julie Bell, Vallejo presents his artwork in an annual calendar and various books.

Vallejo's preferred artistic medium is oil on board, and he has previously used photographs to combine discrete images to form composite images. Preparatory works are pencil or ink sketches, which have been displayed in the book Sketchbook. He and Julie Bell have worked on collaborative artworks together, in which they sign the artwork with both names.

Vallejo has produced film posters for numerous fantasy and action movies, including Knightriders (1981), Q (1982), and Barbarian Queen (1985). He has also illustrated posters for comedies, notably National Lampoon's Vacation (1983), European Vacation (1985), Nothing but Trouble (1991) and Aqua Teen Hunger Force Colon Movie Film for Theaters (2007), co-created with Bell.

He illustrated the 1978 Tarzan calendar. His sea serpent paintings hang in the queue of Loch Ness Monster, a rollercoaster at Busch Gardens Williamsburg.

His art was also featured in the 1995 card game Hyborian Gates.

== Awards ==
He received the Inkpot Award in 1978. He received the British Fantasy Award for best artist in 1979 for his painting The Amazon Princess and her Pet. He won the 1979 Locus Award for Best Professional Artist.

Vallejo also won the 2011 Chesley Award for Lifetime Artistic Achievement, and the 2014 Chesley Award for Best Product Illustration.

== Publications ==
Vallejo's published works include:

- The Fantastic Art of Boris Vallejo (1980)
- Mirage (1982, reprinted 1996 and 2001)
- Enchantment. Stories By Doris Vallejo, Illustrated by Boris Vallejo (1984)
- Fantasy Art Techniques (1985)
- Ladies: Retold Tales of Goddesses and Heroines. By Boris and Doris Vallejo (1992)
- Bodies: Boris Vallejo: Photographic Art (1998)
- Dreams: The Art of Boris Vallejo (1999)
- Titans: The Heroic Visions of Boris Vallejo and Julie Bell (2000)
- Sketchbook (2001)
- Twin Visions (2002)
- Fantasy Workshop: A Practical Guide (with Julie Bell) (2003)
- Boris Vallejo and Julie Bell: The Ultimate Collection (2005)
- The Fabulous Women of Boris Vallejo and Julie Bell (2006)
- Imaginistix (2006)

A yearly calendar of 13 paintings by Boris Vallejo and Julie Bell is produced by Workman Publishing.
