= Mayfair Games =

Game publisher

- Original 1981 logo
- Industry: Board games
- Defunct: 1997
- Fate: Acquired
- Successor: Ironwind, Inc.
- Headquarters: Chicago, Illinois, US
- Key people: Darwin Bromley
- Products: Role Aids, DC Heroes, Board games

Mayfair Games was an American publisher of board, card, and roleplaying games that also licensed Euro-style board games to publish them in English. The company licensed worldwide English-language publishing rights to The Settlers of Catan series between 1996 and 2016.

Ironwind, Inc.
- Updated 1997 logo
- Trade name: Mayfair Games
- Type: Private
- Industry: Board games
- Founded: 1997
- Founder: Iron Crown Enterprises
- Fate: Reorganized, moved 2001
- Successor: Mayfair Games, Inc.
- Headquarters: Skokie, Illinois, US
- Products: Train games, Card games, Dice games
- Services: Foreign and domestic game distribution
- Website: mayfairgames.com

== History ==
Mayfair Games was founded in 1981 by Darwin Bromley in Chicago, Illinois, United States. The company was created to publish Empire Builder, a railroad game designed by Bromley and Bill Fawcett. In 1982, Mayfair Games expanded its focus to include Role Aids, a line of role-playing game supplements.

In 1993, Mayfair was sued by TSR, Inc., who argued that Role Aids violated their 1984 trademark agreement, being advertised as compatible with Advanced Dungeons & Dragons. The court found that some of the line violated the trademark, but the line as a whole did not violate the agreement, and Mayfair continued publishing the line until the rights were bought by TSR.

In 1996, Mayfair Games became the publisher of The Settlers of Catan in the US. The company shut down for financial reasons in 1997 but was subsequently bailed out by Iron Crown Enterprises (ICE), who purchased most of their assets and restarted operations as Ironwind, Inc. This new company operated publicly under the Mayfair Games trademark.

Pete Fenlon became the CEO of Mayfair Games in 2007 to oversee a major reorganization with a refocusing on core brands, most importantly the Catan family of games. In 2013, Mayfair reported selling more than 750,000 Catan-related products. In January 2016, Mayfair transferred all publishing, commercial, and brand rights for all English-language Catan products to Catan Studio, a newly created subsidiary of the Asmodee Group. Former CEO Pete Fenlon left Mayfair Games to become the CEO of the new company. Larry Roznai was the last CEO of Mayfair games. He joined the company in 1999 as a board member, president, and chief operating officer.

On February 9, 2018, Mayfair announced it had sold all of its assets to the North American branch of Asmodée Éditions, and would be shutting down. Rights to some Mayfair titles are no longer retained by Asmodée.

Mayfair Games, Inc.
- Final 2016 logo
- Type: Private
- Industry: Board games
- Founded: 2001
- Headquarters: Skokie, Illinois, US
- Products: Train games, Card games, Dice games
- Services: Foreign and domestic game distribution
- Website: mayfairgames.com

== Notable games ==
This list includes games published by Mayfair and games licensed by Mayfair from other publishers.

- 1830: The Game of Railroads and Robber Barons and other 18XX games
- Agricola
- Bang!
- Blasted Land
- The Settlers of Catan and other Catan games
- Caverna
- Cosmic Encounter
- Discworld: Ankh-Morpork
- Encounters
- Empire Builder games
- I.C.B.M.
- Isle of Skye: From Chieftain to King
- Patchwork
- Role Aids
- Saboteur
- Sim City: The Card Game
- Steam
- Tigris and Euphrates
- Underground
- Wake Island
- The Worlds of Boris Vallejo

=== See also ===
- Going Cardboard, a documentary
