= Martha Washington Goes to War =

Graphic novel

Martha Washington Goes to War is a graphic novel by Frank Miller and Dave Gibbons published by Dark Horse Comics in 1994. It is part of the Martha Washington series.

== Contents ==
Martha Washington Goes to War involves Martha Washington's experiences as a soldier in the Second American Civil War.

== Reception ==
Steve Faragher reviewed Martha Washington Goes to War for Arcane magazine, rating it a 7 out of 10 overall. Faragher comments that "Frank Miller doesn't seem to be running out of things to say, just out of new ways of saying them".

Gibbons won the Eisner Award for "Best Artist/Penciller/Inker or Penciller/Inker Team" in 1995 for Martha Washington Goes to War, and Angus McKie won for "Best Colorist/Coloring".
