= Give Me Liberty (comics) =

1990 American comic book miniseries

- Cover to Give Me Liberty #1. Art by Dave Gibbons

Publication information
- Publisher: Dark Horse Comics
- Schedule: Monthly
- Format: Limited series
- Publication date: 1990
- No. of issues: 4
- Main character: Martha Washington

Creative team
- Created by: Frank Miller (writer); Dave Gibbons (illustrator)

Collected editions
- Give Me Liberty: ISBN 0-440-50446-5

Give Me Liberty is an American four-issue comic book mini-series published by Dark Horse Comics in 1990. It was created and written by Frank Miller and drawn by Dave Gibbons. The title of the series comes from a famous 1775 quotation by American Founding Father Patrick Henry: "I know not what course others may take but — as for me — give me liberty or give me death!".

== Overview ==
Give Me Liberty was one of Frank Miller's two creator-owned (the other was Hard Boiled) titles he took to Dark Horse after deciding to stop working for DC Comics after a dispute over a proposed ratings system.

The story is set in a dystopian near-future where the United States has split into several extremist factions, and tells the story of Martha Washington, a young African American girl from a public housing project called "The Green" (Chicago's Cabrini–Green). The series starts with Martha's birth and sees her slowly grow up from someone struggling to break free of the public housing project, to being a war hero and major figure in deciding the fate of the United States.

The series was a mix of Miller's typical action sequences as well as being a political satire of the United States and its major corporations. The series proved to be a huge success for Dark Horse and was one of the biggest selling independent comics of the time. A trade paperback was later released and Miller followed up Give Me Liberty with several sequels continuing the story. All of these sequels were drawn by Dave Gibbons and published by Dark Horse.

The titles of the original four issues of Give Me Liberty were:

1. Homes & Gardens
2. Travel & Entertainment
3. Health & Welfare
4. Death & Taxes

== Synopsis ==
=== Part 1: Homes & Gardens ===
On the then-future date of March 11, 1995, Martha Washington is born in a Chicago hospital. A year later, Martha’s father is killed during a protest over the African-American community's living conditions at the Cabrini–Green housing project, which has been enclosed in a walled and roofed structure that residents are not permitted to leave. Meanwhile, newly elected President Erwin Rexall has established a repressive dystopia, enforcing harsh economic policies that subject Martha's family to abject poverty while repealing the 22nd Amendment to ensure that he can run for more than two terms.

As she grows up, Martha is an average student who displays a gift for computer programming. Her teacher, Donald, encourages her to perform better and brings her contraband items, such as sandwiches. One night, Martha shows up at Donald’s classroom and finds that he's been murdered by the Ice Man, a hulking enforcer working for a local gangster called the Pope. Martha stabs the Ice Man with his own longshoreman’s hook, causing him to bleed to death.

Martha is remanded to a psychiatric hospital, where she discovers that experiments are being secretly performed on children to genetically alter their minds, effectively turning them into human computers. National budget cuts eventually cause the hospital to shut down, leaving Martha homeless. Medical workers dispatched to round up the patients try to subdue Martha, but she kills one and takes his wallet. She is able to steal money from an ATM using his account card.

In May 2009, Rexall is rendered comatose when the White House is bombed by Saudi Arabian terrorists in retaliation for an accidental misfire of an orbiting laser cannon that was intended to strike Libya, but strikes the Saudi oilfields instead. Nearly every successor in the hierarchy to the presidency is killed in the attack, leaving only the liberal Secretary of Agriculture, Howard Nissen, alive to take the post of president. Nissen proves to be an effective leader, ending years of scattered global wars being fought by Rexall's PAX Peace Force and sending troops to South America to fight the destruction of the rainforests by renegade cattle industrialists.

Martha decides to join the national military force, "PAX", and is sent to fight in South America. There, she experiences the physical and psychological horrors of combat, falling victim to a chemical weapon that permanently turns her hair blonde. She discovers a plot by her commanding officer, Lieutenant Stanford Moretti, to destroy large patches of the rainforest for the enemy. After Moretti shoots her and leaves her for dead, Martha survives and stalks his unit, killing all of the troops under his command. Martha ends up severely wounding Moretti. While both recover in a hospital, Moretti blackmails Martha into becoming his unwitting servant.

=== Part 2: Travel & Entertainment ===
Martha helps PAX win several decisive battles, although Moretti takes nearly all the credit for her heroics. When the war finally ends with PAX victorious, Martha is decorated for bravery in combat while Moretti is promoted to colonel. Martha talks to President Nissen and convinces him to end the squalor at Cabrini-Green, and sends in PAX to aid in the effort. The walled structure that enclosed the Green is demolished and Martha is reunited with her mother, promising she won't have to leave home again.

In 2011, Martha is charged with a mission to stop a white supremacist terrorist group from destroying the White House with a huge orbiting laser cannon. Martha kills the terrorists in the space station's control room, but not before the leader is able to voice the command to fire the pre-targeted cannon. Several terrorists fire at Martha with machine guns, ripping a large hole in the outer hull, causing the station to violently depressurize. While struggling to reach the station's computer room, Martha discovers a child test subject she encountered at the psychiatric hospital. Martha convinces her to stop the firing sequence.

Both Martha and the child escape in a shuttle before the station explodes. Damage to the shuttle causes it to crash-land in the American southwest near the territory of the reorganized Apache Nation. Martha and her child companion, known as "Raggy Ann" (due to her resemblance to a Raggedy Ann doll), are taken as captives by the Apaches, who have been made chronically ill by pollution from an oil refinery they possess, a gift from Nissen himself. Martha forms a tense friendship with one of the Apaches, Wasserstein, who tells her that the Apaches' hostility stems from the poor treatment they've received in recent years, as well as throughout America’s history.

Meanwhile, President Nissen's administration has become crippled by dissension across ranks of PAX, secessionist pressures across America and the disappointing consequences of policy decisions towards the Apaches. Colonel Moretti works behind the scenes as a treacherous adviser to President Nissen, who has become an alcoholic. In a drunken rage, Nissen murders his Vice President and signs an official document without reading it. The document, drafted by Moretti himself, orders the Chairman of the Joint Chiefs to use PAX's laser cannon to incinerate the Apache Nation. The attack will also kill Martha, a plan Moretti has been working toward for years.

=== Part 3: Health & Welfare ===
Martha learns of Moretti's plans from Raggy Ann, who is telepathic and can voice Moretti’s thoughts. She steals a Jeep and heads out into the desert; Wasserstein catches up to her vehicle and tries to stop her escape. At that moment, the laser cannon fires upon the Apache Nation. Martha looks directly at the blast and is blinded.

The group is captured by the army of the Surgeon General, an insane separatist who controls the Pacific Northwest. He is also a religious fanatic who opposes pornography, rock music, birth control, and unclean environmental conditions. He uses a technique based on music to brainwash Martha and transform her into one of his soldiers. He also replaces her blinded eyes and renames her "Margaret Snowden".

Meanwhile, Moretti murders the Chairman of the Joint Chiefs, General Lucius Spank, and stages his death as a suicide. Moretti also leaves the document authorizing the destruction of the Apache Nation at the scene, which becomes devastating to Nissen’s administration when it becomes public. Moretti then joins the Cabinet in betraying and assassinating Nissen. However, Moretti betrays the conspirators and locks them inside the White House, which he rigs to explode.

Moretti declares himself the country's interim leader and orders the destruction of the Surgeon General's stronghold, Fortress Health, by laser cannon. The Surgeon General counters with his own plan to launch hundreds of nuclear missiles at the laser cannon. He also reveals that he possesses Rexall’s brain, which he will use to create a clone of Rexall that will take office as president.

Wasserstein formulates a plan to infiltrate Fortress Health and rescue Martha. Raggy Ann joins him, her telepathic abilities a useful asset. "Margaret" is dispatched to deal with Wasserstein, whom she shoots. She turns him and Raggy Ann over to Fortress Health authorities. Moments before, Raggy Ann had "uploaded" the memories that Martha lost during her brainwashing. She walks outside to the grounds of the fortress just as the Surgeon General orders the launch of his missiles.

=== Part 4: Death & Taxes ===
Moretti assumes command of PAX and is sequestered aboard a huge plane that he uses as a mobile command center. However, Moretti lacks the experience of a true leader and causes the United States to splinter further, with Brooklyn, Manhattan, Florida and Texas declaring independence and becoming poised to declare a civil war. Moretti's attempts to negotiate with these factions fail rapidly and his obsessive pre-occupation with the Surgeon General is heavily criticized by his military advisers.

Martha reports to the Surgeon General’s command center and he updates her on the situation. If the fortress is attacked, she will take Rexall’s brain, housed in a small, mobile container, and evacuate the area with it. Martha unexpectedly shoots the Surgeon General several times, revealing that he is actually a sophisticated robot. At the same time, Wasserstein, still alive, escapes confinement with Raggy Ann. They find the control room and Martha has Raggy Ann detonate one of the missiles, destroying them all. The cannon and its command crew are safe.

Moretti sends all air forces to bomb Fortress Health. Martha takes Wasserstein, Raggy Ann, Rexall’s encased brain, and Rexall’s wife and escapes the bombing in a plane, with the still-functioning Surgeon General clinging to the plane’s exterior. Moretti is informed by his troops that Fortress Health has fallen but there is no sign of Martha or Rexall. Martha’s plane streaks away, pursued by Moretti himself. Moretti’s pilot fires missiles at Martha’s jet, but they hit the Surgeon General instead after he is blasted off the plane by the shotgun-wielding Martha.

Martha and her weary fugitive group fly south to the Brazilian rainforest. They will be safe there since an executive order from the Nissen administration protects it from destruction by orbiting laser cannons. Moretti gathers a PAX unit of former criminals, some of whom have personal grudges with Martha. They hunt the fugitives in the rainforest. Martha and Wasserstein fight together using a box of surgical tools they find on the plane, killing nearly all of Moretti's unit. Moretti finds Rexall’s brain with his wife, whom he brutally murders. Martha finds Moretti and they engage in hand-to-hand combat. She overpowers and arrests him.

The story closes in the year 2012. Rexall has been given a new robotic body and is easily voted back into office in a special election. Moretti stands trial for murder and treason and is sentenced to death by firing squad. Martha visits him the day he is to be executed and they talk for a while, Moretti showing obvious remorse for his actions. Martha gives him her belt and he hangs himself from a pipe in his cell.

== Sequels ==
Give Me Liberty was followed by:

- The five-issue series Martha Washington Goes to War in 1994, which was closely based on Ayn Rand's Atlas Shrugged. In this series, Rexall's increasingly corrupt government is subverted by the Surgeon General, who attempts a coup. Meanwhile, Martha is on the trail of the "Ghosts", a seditionist faction with an artificially-intelligent supercomputer. Joining up with the seditionists, Martha is instrumental in bringing down the corrupt government.
- One-shot issue Happy Birthday Martha Washington in March 1995, featuring:
  - "Collateral Damage", originally published in black and white under the title Martha Washington’s War Diary in the Dark Horse Presents Fifth Anniversary Special (1991).
  - "State of the Art", originally published in San Diego Comic-Con Comics #2 (1993).
  - "Insubordination" - in "Insubordination", which is set in Philadelphia on February 6, 2013, Martha is order to recover a sample of blood from Captain Kurtz, who is the inventor of a super soldier serum that has kept him young for 40 years. Captain Kurtz dies protecting the Liberty Bell from Nazi rebels. Martha succeeds in acquiring the blood sample but decides to destroy the blood sample because she believes that Captain Kurtz was the only person able to control the power of the serum.
- One-shot issue Martha Washington Stranded in Space in November 1995, featuring:
  - "Crossover", guest-starring The Big Guy. Martha investigates a space anomaly that temporarily sends her to Big Guy's reality.
  - "Attack of the Flesh Eating Monsters", originally published in black and white in Dark Horse Presents #100-4. Martha fights off an attack by monsters conforming to 1950s pulp-SF stereotypes; she discovers that this is merely a psychological study conducted by the world-controlling AI. The AI's plot is a satire of the conclusion of Gibbons' Watchmen, as a character plots to unite the world through the fake threat of alien invasion.
- The three-issue series Martha Washington Saves the World in 1997. An actual alien spaceship arrives, and Martha uses its superior technology to defeat the megalomaniacal AI.
- One-shot issue Martha Washington Dies in 2007.

There is an additional Martha Washington story "Logistics", which was published exclusively as part of a comic distributed with the Martha Washington action figure. In "Logistics", the story, which is set on June 13, 2012, reveals that the 94th Amendment to the US Constitution strictly forbids the breeding, slaughter, or sale of red meat; that does not stop Martha and PAX from eating meat burgers when their logistics train runs out of food. Because of the ban on red meat, most of the American Southwest and all of the Mexican Territory secede from the United States, which call themselves Real America.

== Collected editions ==
On September 9, 2009, Dark Horse released a 600-page hardcover titled The Life and Times of Martha Washington in the Twenty First Century. The book includes every Martha Washington story as well as several extras.
