= Dave Gibbons =

English comics artist and writer

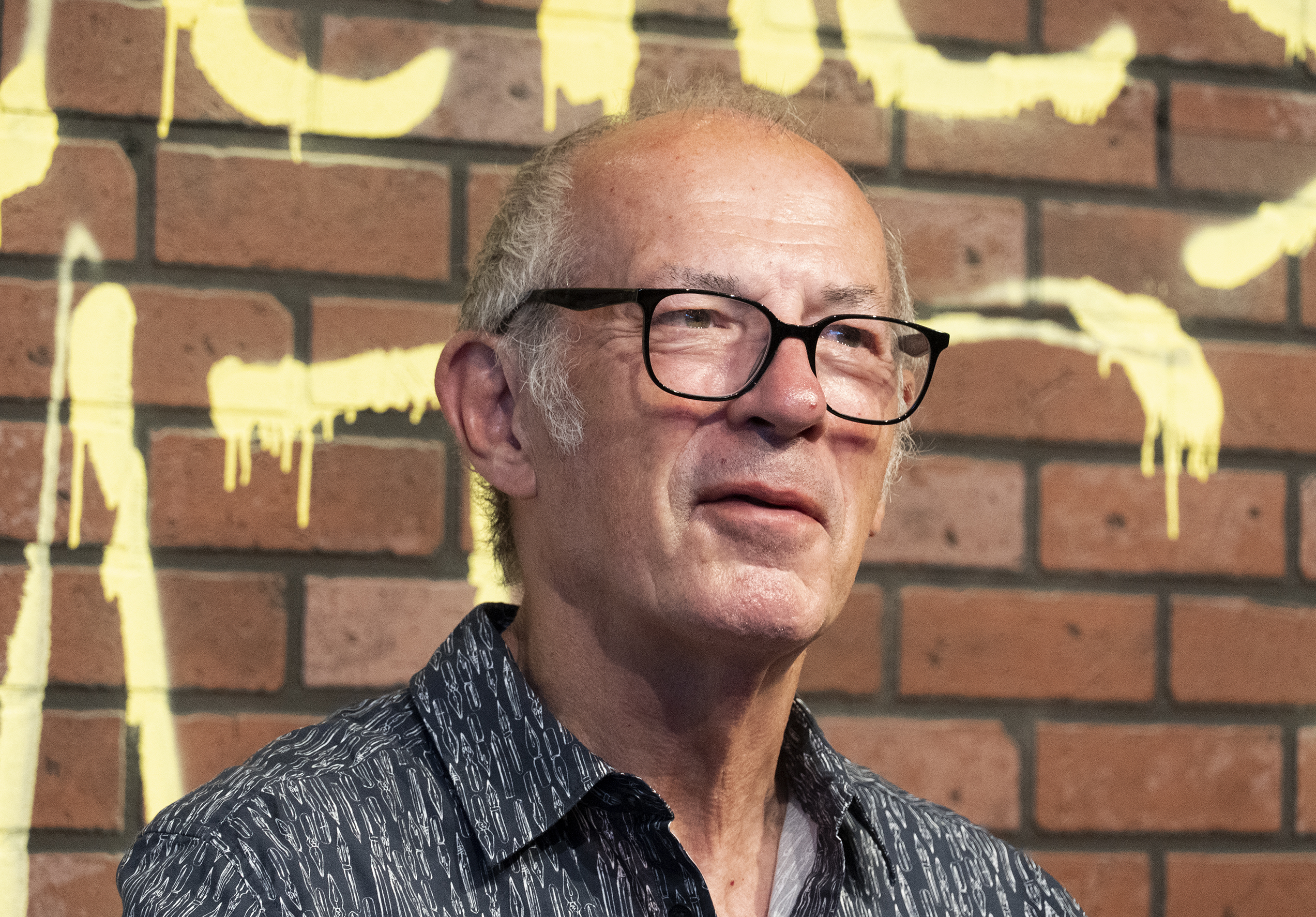
- Gibbons at the Comicfestival München, Germany (2025)
- Born: David Chester Gibbons; 14 April 1949 (age 77) London, England
- Areas: Writer, Penciller, Inker, Letterer
- Notable works: Watchmen; Rogue Trooper; Dan Dare; For the Man Who Has Everything; Green Lantern; Kingsman
- Awards: Inkpot Award (1986); Two Kirby Awards (1987); Harvey Award Hall of Fame (2018)

David Chester Gibbons (born 14 April 1949) is an English comics artist, writer and sometimes letterer. He is best known for his collaborations with writer Alan Moore, which include the miniseries Watchmen and the Superman story "For the Man Who Has Everything". He was an artist for 2000 AD, for which he contributed a large body of work from its first issue in 1977.

== Early life ==
Gibbons was born on 14 April 1949, at Forest Gate Hospital in London, to Chester, a town planner, and Gladys, a secretary. He began reading comic books at the age of seven. A self-taught artist, he illustrated his own comic strips. Gibbons became a building surveyor but eventually entered the UK comics industry as a letterer for IPC Media. He left his surveyor job to focus on his comics career.

Gibbons spent his young adult years as part of England's Mod subculture, where he was immersed in club life and used amphetamines at all-weekend parties. He paid tribute to that lifestyle in his graphic novel The Originals.

== British comics work ==
Gibbons's earliest published work was in British underground comics, starting with The Trials of Nasty Tales, including the main cover illustration, and continuing in cOZmic Comics produced by Felix Dennis.

=== IPC Comics ===
Gibbons entered the British comics industry by working on horror and action titles for both DC Thomson and IPC. One of his earlier works was a 12-part comic-series titled Year of the Shark Men for DC Thomson's The Wizard magazine, in April 1976 – July 1976. When the science-fiction title 2000 AD was set up in the mid-1970s, Gibbons contributed artwork to the first issue, Prog 01 (February 1977), and went on to draw the first 24 instalments of Harlem Heroes, one of the founding (and pre-Judge Dredd) strips.

Midway through the comic's first year he began illustrating Dan Dare, a cherished project for Gibbons who had been a fan of the original series and artist Frank Hampson who, alongside Frank Bellamy, Don Lawrence and Ron Turner are well-liked and inspirational artists to Gibbons, whose "style evolved out of [his] love for the MAD magazine artists like Wally Wood and Will Elder".

Working on early feature Ro-Busters (after Starlord merged with 2000 AD), Gibbons became one of the most prolific of 2000 AD's earliest creators, contributing artwork to 108 of the first 131 Progs/issues. He returned to the pages of "the Galaxy's Greatest Comic" in the early 1980s to create Rogue Trooper with writer Gerry Finley-Day and produce an early run on that feature, before handing it over to a succession of other artists. He illustrated a handful of Tharg's Future Shocks shorts, primarily with author Alan Moore.

Gibbons was known, by sight but not by name, to readers of the short-lived IPC title Tornado. Whereas 2000 AD was said to be "edited" by the alien Tharg, Tornado was "edited" by superhero Big E, who as alter-ego Percy Pilbeam worked on the magazine. These characters appeared in photographic form within the comic, with Gibbons posing as both Big E and Pilbeam for the entire 22-issue run of Tornado before it was subsumed into 2000 AD.

=== Doctor Who ===
Gibbons departed from 2000 AD briefly in the late 1970s/early 1980s to become the lead artist on Doctor Who Weekly/Monthly, for which magazine he drew the main comic strip from issue No. 1 until No. 69, missing only four issues during that time.

The Doctor Who Storybook 2007 (released Christmas 2006) features a story called "Untitled" which includes the name Gibbons in a list of great artists of Earth history.

The 2023 special "The Star Beast" was based on his 1980 comic of the same name, written by Pat Mills.

== American comics work ==
=== 1980s ===
Gibbons was one of the British comic talents identified by Len Wein in 1982 for American publisher DC Comics: he was hired primarily to draw "Green Lantern Corps" backup stories within the pages of Green Lantern. Gibbons's first DC work was on the Green Lantern Corps story in Green Lantern No. 161 (February 1983), with writer Todd Klein, as well as the concurrently released "Creeper" two-part backup story in The Flash #318–319. Gibbons drew the lead story in The Brave and the Bold No. 200 (July 1983) which featured a team-up of the Batmen of Earth-One and Earth-Two. With Green Lantern No. 172 (Jan. 1984), Gibbons joined writer Wein on the main feature while continuing to illustrate the backup features. In issue No. 182, Wein and Gibbons made architect John Stewart, who had been introduced previously in issue No. 87, the title's primary character. Ceding the "Tales of the Green Lantern Corps" backup features to various other individuals from No. 181, Gibbons's last issue with Wein was issue No. 186 (March 1985). Gibbons returned to pencil the backup story "Mogo Doesn't Socialize" with Alan Moore in issue No. 188.

While Marvel Comics reprinted some of Gibbons's Marvel UK Doctor Who work, Eclipse Comics reprinted some of his Warrior work and Eagle reprinted various Judge Dredd tales, Gibbons continued to produce new work almost exclusively for DC throughout the 1980s. For the 1985 Superman Annual No. 11, Gibbons drew the main story "For the Man Who Has Everything", again written by Alan Moore.

During 1985 and 1986, Gibbons's artwork appeared in several issues of both DC's Who's Who: The Definitive Directory of the DC Universe and Marvel's The Official Handbook of the Marvel Universe Deluxe Edition. He was one of the contributors to the DC Challenge limited series and in December 1986, he contributed to Harrier Comics' Brickman No. 1 alongside Kevin O'Neill, Lew Stringer and others. Between May and August 1988, he contributed covers to The Phantom miniseries, inked Kevin Maguire's pencilled contribution to Action Comics No. 600, and produced the cover to Action Comics Weekly No. 601.

==== Watchmen ====
The cast of Watchmen, created in 1986 by Gibbons and Alan Moore.

He is best known in the US for collaborating with Alan Moore on the 12-issue limited series Watchmen, now one of the best-selling graphic novels of all time, and the only one to feature on Time's "Top 100 Novels" list. Gibbons's artwork in Watchmen is notable both for its stark utilisation of the formulaic comicbook nine-panel grid layout, as well as for its intense narrative and symbolic density, with some symbolic background elements suggested by Moore, others by Gibbons.

Initially pitched by Moore to use the Charlton Comics characters which had been purchased by DC Comics, Watchmen was re-tooled to feature new, analogue characters when it became clear that the story would have significant and lasting ramifications on its main players. Gibbons believes that his own involvement likely came about after the idea was already in its early initial stages. He recalls that he had:

... known Alan for a while and we had tried to get things off the ground with DC and hadn't really succeeded. Then Alan finally broke into DC with Swamp Thing and I guess I must have heard on the grapevine that he was doing a treatment for a new miniseries. I rang Alan up, saying I'd like to be involved with what he was doing. He said 'Oh, yeah great' and sent me the outline for it. Then I was at a convention in the US and asked Dick Giordano, managing director of DC at the time, point blank whether I could draw this thing Alan was writing. He said 'How does Alan feel about that?' I said 'Yeah he's fine with it' and Dick said 'Yep, OK, it's yours!'

To complement the story, Gibbons remembers working on rough character designs which ultimately changed little in their final appearance from "the descriptions that Alan had provided," trying to come up with "a classic superhero feel but be a little bit stranger ... a sort of operatic look ... an Egyptian kind of a look."

Gibbons lettered Watchmen and it was his lettering style that later served as one of two reference sources used by Vincent Connare when creating the controversial font Comic Sans in 1994. Gibbons has commented that "It's just a shame they couldn't have used just the original font, because it's a real mess. I think it's a particularly ugly letter form."

Comics historian Les Daniels noted that Watchmen "called into question the basic assumptions on which the super hero genre is formulated". DC Comics writer and executive Paul Levitz observed in 2010 that "As with The Dark Knight Returns, Watchmen set off a chain reaction of rethinking the nature of super heroes and heroism itself, and pushed the genre darker for more than a decade. The series won acclaim...and would continue to be regarded as one of the most important literary works the field ever produced."

Gibbons returned to Watchmen in 2008, producing the behind-the-scenes book Watching the Watchmen to tie into the release of the 2009 film. Watching the Watchmen is his take on the creation of the seminal work, and features a number of rarely seen pieces of artwork including sketches and character designs, as well as "stuff," he says "that I just don't know why I kept but I'm really pleased I did." Gibbons stated that "I'm basically thrilled with the movie, you know; it's been in the making for years. There have been proposals to make it – some I was excited about, some I was less excited about. But I think the way that it finally has been made is just great. I honestly can't imagine it being made much better."

=== 1990s ===
Give Me Liberty No. 1 (1990) Art by Gibbons; story by Frank Miller

From the start of the 1990s, Gibbons began to focus as much on writing and inking as on drawing, contributing to a number of different titles and issues from a variety of companies. Particular highlights included, in 1990, Gibbons writing the three-issue World's Finest miniseries for artist Steve Rude and DC, while drawing Give Me Liberty for writer Frank Miller and Dark Horse Comics. He penned the first Batman Versus Predator crossover for artists Andy and Adam Kubert (Dec. 1991 – Feb. 1992), and inked Rick Veitch and Stephen R. Bissette for half of Alan Moore's 1963 Image Comics series (1993).

Rejoining Frank Miller in mid-1994 on Martha Washington Goes to War, the following year Gibbons wrote the Elseworlds title Superman: Kal for José Luis García-López, melding Arthurian legends to the Superman mythos in an "out-of-continuity" tale set in an alternate DC Universe. In Marvel Edge's Savage Hulk No. 1 (Jan 1996), Gibbons wrote, penciled, inked, coloured and lettered "Old Friends", a version of the events of Captain America No. 110 from the point of view of the Hulk. In 1996 and 1997, Gibbons collaborated with Mark Waid and Jimmy Palmiotti on two issues of the Amalgam Comics character "Super-Soldier," a character born from the merging of the DC and Marvel Universes after the events of the 1996 intercompany crossover DC vs. Marvel/Marvel vs. DC.

Among many other covers, one-shots and minor works, Gibbons worked with Alan Moore again briefly on the latter's Awesome Entertainment Judgment Day miniseries, providing (variant) covers to all three issues, on the first issue of Kitchen Sink Press's The Spirit: The New Adventures revival and within the pages of the Alan Moore Songbook. He designed the logo for Oni Press in 1997. In 1999 he penciled and inked Darko Macan's four-issue Star Wars: Vader's Quest miniseries.

=== 2000s ===
Gibbons was one of the artists on the Superman and Batman: World's Funnest one-shot written by Evan Dorkin and in December 2001 Gibbons collaborated with Stan Lee on Just Imagine... Stan Lee creating Green Lantern.

Gibbons wrote Captain America issues #17–20 (Nov. 2003 – Jan. 2004) for artist Lee Weeks. In 2005, he drew covers for JSA, as well as producing the complete original graphic novel The Originals, a black and white graphic novel which he scripted and drew. Published by Vertigo, the work is set in the near future, but draws heavily on the imagery of the Mods and Rockers of the 1960s.

He wrote The Rann–Thanagar War six-issue limited series for DC Comics, one of four lead-ins to the company-wide "Infinite Crisis" storyline, and returned to the Green Lantern Corps with the five-issue Green Lantern Corps: Recharge (Nov. 2005 – March 2006), co-written with Geoff Johns, which spun off into an ongoing, Gibbons-written series in August 2006.

Gibbons was involved in two series released by DC/WildStorm when DC acquired American rights to the IPC stable of characters. He provided cover artwork for the flagship title, Albion, the six-issue limited series written by Leah Moore and her husband, John Reppion and co-plotted by her father, Alan Moore. Gibbons wrote the Albion spin-off Thunderbolt Jaxon (April–Sept. 2006), with art by John Higgins.

Gibbons provided covers for three issues of writers Kurt Busiek and Fabian Nicieza's run on Action Comics (issues #841–843) and co-penciled (with Ethan van Sciver) the Green Lantern: Sinestro Corps issue as part of the "Sinestro Corps" story arc. He contributed to the ongoing Green Lantern Corps title on issues #18–20 (May–July 2007). Gibbons and Ryan Sook produced a Kamandi serial for Wednesday Comics in 2009. In the late 2000s, he provided new alternative covers to IDW Publishing's reprints of his Marvel UK Doctor Who comics.

=== 2010s ===
On 9 April 2011 Gibbons was one of 62 comics creators who appeared at the IGN stage at the Kapow! convention in London to set two Guinness World Records, the Fastest Production of a Comic Book, and Most Contributors to a Comic Book. With Guinness officials on hand to monitor their progress, writer Mark Millar began work at 9am scripting a 20-page black and white Superior comic book, with various artists appearing on stage throughout the day to work on the pencils, inks, and lettering. The artists included Gibbons, Frank Quitely, John Romita Jr., Jock, Adi Granov, Doug Braithwaite, Ian Churchill, Olivier Coipel, Duncan Fegredo, Simon Furman, David Lafuente, John McCrea, Sean Phillips and Liam Sharp, who all drew a panel each, with regular Superior artist Leinil Yu creating the book's front cover. The book was completed in 11 hours, 19 minutes, and 38 seconds, and was published through Icon on 23 November 2011, with all royalties being donated to Yorkhill Children's Foundation.

In 2014 he was appointed the UK's first Comics Laureate, to act as an ambassador for comic books and their potential to improve literacy.

Gibbons drew the 1950s variant cover for Action Comics No. 1000 (June 2018).

== Work in other media ==
Works other than comics include providing the cartoon strip on the inside sleeve of Jethro Tull's 1976 album Too Old to Rock 'n' Roll: Too Young to Die!, background art for the 1994 computer game Beneath a Steel Sky and the cover to K, the 1996 debut album by psychedelic rock band Kula Shaker. In 1988, he did the cover art of album The Madness. In 2007, he served as a consultant on the film Watchmen, which was adapted from the book, and released in March 2009. Broken Sword: The Shadow of the Templars – Director's Cut (2009) featured hand drawn art by Dave Gibbons. Since 2021, Gibbons has delivered the annual Christmas Day Message on Forbidden Planet TV, the official YouTube channel of the UK's Forbidden Planet comics retail chain. Also since 2021, Gibbons has performed the voices of Jacob Marley and The Ghost of Christmas Present in the annual Hard Agree Christmas Carol comics charity podcast.

== Awards ==
=== Wins ===
- 1986 Inkpot Award
- 1987 Jack Kirby Award for Best New Series for Watchmen with Alan Moore
- 1987 Jack Kirby Award for Best Writer/Artist (Single or Team) for Watchmen with Alan Moore
- 2018 Harvey Award Hall of Fame inductee

=== Nominations ===
- 1986 Jack Kirby Best Single Issue nomination for Superman Annual No. 11 (1985) with Alan Moore
- 1987 Jack Kirby Best Single Issue nomination for Watchmen No. 1 with Alan Moore
- 1987 Jack Kirby Best Single Issue nomination for Watchmen No. 2 with Alan Moore

== Bibliography ==
=== UK publishers ===
Titles published by various British publishers include:

- 2000 AD (IPC Media/Fleetway):
  - Harlem Heroes (a, with Tom Tully, in #1–24, 1977) collected in The Complete Harlem Heroes (tpb, 320 pages, Rebellion Developments, 2010, ISBN 1-906735-52-2)
  - Dan Dare (a):
    - "Legion" (with Gerry Finley-Day, in #28–33, 1977)
    - "Greenworld" (with Gerry Finley-Day and Brian Bolland, in #34–35, 1977)
    - "Star Slayer" (with Gerry Finley-Day, in #36–51, 1977–1978)
    - "Doppelganger" (with Jack Adrian, in #52–55, 1978)
    - "Waterworld" (with Jack Adrian, in #56–60, 1978)
    - "Ice Planet" (with Gerry Finley-Day, in #64–66, 1978)
    - "Garden of Eden" (with Jack Adrian, in #67–72, 1978)
    - "Mutiny!" (with Jack Adrian, in #73–78, 1978)
    - "The Doomsday Machine, Parts 6–7" (with Nick Landau, Roy Preston and Garry Leach, in #84–85, 1978)
    - "Servant of Evil!" (with Tom Tully, in #100–107, 109–118, 1979)
    - "Traitor" (with Tom Tully, in #119–126, 1979)
  - Ro-Busters (a, with Pat Mills):
    - The Complete Ro-Busters (tpb, 336 pages, Rebellion, 2008, ISBN 1-905437-82-X) includes:
      - "Death on the Orient Express!" (in #86–87, 1977)
      - "Just Routine!" (in #91, 1978)
      - "The Terra-Meks!" (in #98–101, 1978–1979)
  - Judge Dredd (a):
    - The Complete Case Files Volume 1 (tpb, 336 pages, 2005, ISBN 1-904265-79-0) includes:
      - "The Neon Knights" (with Pat Mills, in #29, 1977)
    - The Complete Case Files Volume 2 (tpb, 320 pages, 2006, ISBN 1-904265-83-9) includes:
      - "Outlaw" (with John Howard and Brian Bolland, in No. 87, 1978)
    - The Complete Case Files Volume 3 (tpb, 240 pages, 2006, ISBN 1-904265-87-1) includes:
      - "Dredd and the Mob Blitzers" (with John Howard, in #130, 1979)
  - ABC Warriors: "Cyboons" (a, with Pat Mills, in #130–131, 1977)
  - Ro-Jaws' Robo-Tales (a):
    - "The Revolt of the Tick Tock Monkey-Bomb!" (with Gary Rice, in No. 157, 1980)
    - "The Dating Game" (with Alan Moore, in No. 176, 1980)
    - "The Tidy-Up Droid" (with Gary Rice, in No. 181, 1980)
    - "Tomorrow Brings Doom!" (with Gary Rice, in No. 183, 1980)
    - "Night of the Werebot" (with Gary Rice, in No. 184, 1980)
    - "Spirit of Vengeance" (with Gary Rice, in No. 196, 1981)
  - Rogue Trooper:
    - Tales of Nu-Earth Volume 1 (tpb, 400 pages, 2010, ISBN 1-906735-34-4) includes:
      - "Future War" (a, with Gerry Finley-Day, in #228–232, 234–235, 239–240 and 249–250, 1981–1982)
    - "The War Machine" (w, with William Simpson, in #650–653, 667–671 and 683–687, 1989–1990)
    - "Remembrance Day" (a, with John Tomlinson, in Prog 2000, 1999)
  - Tharg's Future Shocks (a, with Alan Moore):
    - The Complete Alan Moore Future Shocks (tpb, 208 pages, Rebellion, 2011, ISBN 1-907992-50-2) includes:
      - "Return of the Thing!" (in #265, 1982)
      - "Skirmish!" (in #267, 1982)
      - "The Wild Frontier!" (in #269, 1982)
      - "The Disturbed Digestions of Doctor Dibworthy" (in #273, 1982)
      - "Chronocops" (in #310, 1983)
- Marvel UK:
  - Hulk Comic #1: "The Incredible Hulk" (a, with Steve Moore, 1979)
  - Doctor Who Magazine (a):
    - Doctor Who: The Iron Legion (tpb, 164 pages, 2004, ISBN 1-904159-37-0) collects:
      - "The Iron Legion" (with Pat Mills and John Wagner, in #1–8, 1979)
      - "City of the Damned" (with Pat Mills and John Wagner, in #9–16, 1979–1980)
      - "The Star Beast" (with Pat Mills and John Wagner, in #19–26, 1980)
      - "The Dogs of Doom" (with Pat Mills and John Wagner, in #27–34, 1980)
      - "The Time Witch" (with Steve Moore, in #35–38, 1980)
    - Doctor Who: Dragon's Claw (tpb, 164 pages, 2005, ISBN 1-904159-81-8) collects:
      - "Dragon's Claw" (with Steve Moore, in #39–45, 1980)
      - "The Collector" (with Steve Moore, in #46, 1980)
      - "Dreamers of Death" (with Steve Moore, in #47–48, 1980–1981)
      - "The Life Bringer" (with Steve Moore, in #49–50, 1981)
      - "War of the Words" (with Steve Moore, in #51, 1981)
      - "Spider-God" (with Steve Moore, in #52, 1981)
      - "The Deal" (with Steve Parkhouse, in No. 53, 1981)
      - "End of the Line" (with Steve Parkhouse, in #54–55, 1981)
      - "The Free-Fall Warriors" (with Steve Parkhouse, in #56–57, 1981)
      - "The Neutron Knights" (with Steve Parkhouse, in No. 60, 1982)
    - Doctor Who: The Tides of Time (tpb, 288 pages, 2005, ISBN 1-904159-92-3) includes:
      - "The Tides of Time" (with Steve Parkhouse, in #61–67, 1982)
      - "Stars Fell on Stockbridge" (with Steve Parkhouse, in #68–69, 1982)
- Warrior #1: "A True Story" (a, with Steve Moore, Quality Communications, 1982)
- Brickman #1: " The Brickman Caper" (a, with Lew Stringer, Mike Collins and Kevin O'Neill, Harrier, 1986)
- Knockabout:
  - Outrageous Tales from the Old Testament: "Sodom and Gomorrah" (w/a, anthology graphic novel, tpb, 64 pages, 1987, ISBN 0-86166-054-4)
  - Seven Deadly Sins: "Gluttony" (w, with Lew Stringer, 1989)
- AARGH! #1: "Just Waiting" (w/a, Mad Love, 1988)
- A1 #1: "Survivor" (a, with Ted McKeever, Atomeka, 1989)

=== DC Comics ===
Titles published by DC Comics and its various imprints include:

- Green Lantern:
  - Green Lantern:
    - Tales of the Green Lantern Corps (a):
      - Volume 1 (tpb, 160 pages, 2009, ISBN 1-4012-2155-6) includes:
        - "Storm Brother" (with Robin Snyder, in v2 No. 161, 1983)
        - "Apprentice" (with Todd Klein, in v2 No. 162, 1983)
        - "Hero" (with Todd Klein, in v2 No. 164, 1983)
        - "Green Magic, Test of Will!" (with Todd Klein, in v2 #165–166, 1983)
        - "Successor" (with Todd Klein, in v2 No. 167, 1983)
      - Volume 2 (tpb, 144 pages, 2010, ISBN 1-4012-2702-3) includes:
        - "Deeter & Dragons!" (with Todd Klein, in v2 #171, 1983)
        - "Scavenger" (with Todd Klein, in v2 #172, 1984)
        - "Progress!" (with Joey Cavalieri, in v2 No. 173, 1984)
        - "Enemy Lines!" (with Todd Klein, in v2 #179–180, 1984)
        - "Mogo Doesn't Socialize" (with Alan Moore, in v2 No. 188, 1985)
    - Green Lantern (a, with Len Wein, in v2 #172–176, 178–183 and 185–186, 1984–1985)
    - Sinestro Corps War (a):
      - Tales of the Sinestro Corps (hc, 200 pages, 2008, ISBN 1-4012-1801-6; tpb, 2009, ISBN 1-4012-2326-5) includes:
        - "The Greatest Once, the Greatest Again" (with Geoff Johns, in Sinestro Corps Special, 2008)
        - "Despotellis Spreads Fear" (with Geoff Johns, co-feature, in v4 No. 18, 2007)
        - "Never Alone Again" (with Geoff Johns, co-feature, in v4 No. 19, 2007)
        - "The Fear Within" (with Geoff Johns, co-feature, in v4 No. 20, 2007)
  - Just Imagine Stan Lee with Dave Gibbons Creating Green Lantern (a, with Stan Lee, Michael Uslan and José Luis García-López, one-shot, 2001)
  - Green Lantern Corps: Recharge (w, with Geoff Johns and Patrick Gleason, 2005–2006) collected as tpb, 160 pages, 2006, ISBN 1-4012-0962-9
  - Green Lantern Corps v2 (w/a, with Patrick Gleason, 2006–2007) collected in:
    - To be a Lantern (collects #1–6, tpb, 144 pages, 2007, ISBN 1-4012-1356-1)
    - The Dark Side of Green (includes #7–13, tpb, 168 pages, 2007, ISBN 1-4012-1507-6)
    - The Sinestro Corps War, Volume 1 (includes #14–15, hc, 176 pages, 2008, ISBN 1-4012-1650-1; tpb, 2009, ISBN 1-4012-1870-9)
    - The Sinestro Corps War, Volume 2 (includes #16–17, hc, 192 pages, 2008, ISBN 1-4012-1800-8; tpb, 2009, ISBN 1-4012-2036-3)
- The Flash #318–319: "The Creeper" (a, with Carl Gafford, co-feature, 1983)
- Batman:
  - The Brave and the Bold #200: "Smell of Brimstone, Stench of Death!" (a, with Mike W. Barr, 1983)
  - Christmas with the Super-Heroes #2: "And in the Depths" (w, with Gray Morrow, 1989)
  - Batman vs. Predator #1–3 (w, with Andy Kubert, 1991–1992) collected as Batman vs. Predator (tpb, 128 pages, 1993, ISBN 1-56389-092-5)
  - Batman: Black & White:
    - Volume 2 (tpb, 176 pages, 2003, ISBN 1-56389-917-5) includes:
      - "The Black and White Bandit" (w/a, in Gotham Knights No. 12, 2001)
    - Volume 3 (tpb, 288 pages, 2008, ISBN 1-4012-1354-5) includes:
      - "Fat City" (w, with Michael McMahon, in Gotham Knights No. 18, 2001)
- Legion of Super-Heroes (a):
  - The Curse (hc, 544 pages, 2011, ISBN 1-4012-3098-9) includes:
    - "Whatever Gods There be..." (with Paul Levitz and Keith Giffen, in Annual No. 2, 1983)
  - Teenage Revolution (tpb, 200 pages, 2005, ISBN 1-4012-0482-1) includes:
    - "Confession" (with Mark Waid, in v5 No. 4, 2005)
- The Omega Men #33: "Vega: Demon with the Healing Hand" (a, with Steve Parkhouse, 1985)
- Superman:
  - Superman (a):
    - Whatever Happened to the Man of Tomorrow? (hc, 128 pages, 2009, ISBN 1-4012-2347-8) includes:
      - "For the Man Who Has Everything..." (with Alan Moore, in Annual #11, 1985)
    - "Superman: The Dailies 2002 – Super-Commander Kent – In the 7th Millennium!" (with Mark Schultz, in The Adventures of Superman No. 600, 2002)
  - Superman: Kal (w, with José Luis García-López, graphic novel, tpb, 59 pages, 1995, ISBN 1-56389-167-0)
- Heroes Against Hunger (a, with Len Wein, one-shot, 1986)
- DC Challenge #5: "Thunderbolts and Lightning" (a, with Mike W. Barr and Mark Farmer, 1986)
- Watchmen (a, with Alan Moore, 1986–1987) collected as tpb, 334 pages, 1987, ISBN 0-446-38689-8; hc, 464 pages, 2005, ISBN 1-4012-0713-8
- World's Finest #1–3 (w, with Steve Rude, 1990) collected as WF (tpb, 160 pages, 1993, ISBN 1-56389-068-2; hc, 176 pages, 2008, ISBN 1-4012-1809-1)
- The Big Book of Little Criminals: "Frank 'Dasher' Abbandando—Murder Inc.'s Fastest Killer" (a, with Carl Sifakis, Paradox Press, 1996)
- Super Soldier: Man of War: "Deadly Cargo" (a, with Mark Waid, one-shot, 1997)
- The Dome: Ground Zero (w, with Angus McKie, graphic novel, tpb, 64 pages, Helix, 1998, ISBN 1-56389-346-0)
- Legends of the DC Universe 80-Page Giant: "Lights, Camera and Too Much Action" (a, with James Robinson, 1998)
- Fanboy #2: ""Higher Education" with... Fanboy" (a, with Mark Evanier, among other artists, 1999) collected in tpb, 144 pages, 2001, ISBN 1-56389-724-5
- America's Best Comics:
  - Tom Strong, Book One (hc, 208 pages, 2000, ISBN 1-56389-654-0; tpb, 2001, ISBN 1-56389-664-8) includes:
    - "The Big Heat?" (a, with Alan Moore, in #6, 2000)
  - Greyshirt: Indigo Sunset (tpb, 224 pages, 2003, ISBN 1-56389-909-4) includes:
    - "The Butt Kicks Back!" (w, with Rick Veitch, in No. 5, 2002)
- Superman and Batman: World's Funnest: "Last Imp Standing!" (a, with Evan Dorkin, among other artists, one-shot, 2000)
- Orion #4: "Tales of the New Gods: Ashes, Ashes, We All Fall Down..." (a, with Walt Simonson, 2000) collected in O: The Gates of Apokolips (tpb, 144 pages, 2001, ISBN 1-56389-778-4)
- DC Comics Presents: The Atom: "Ride a Deadly Grenade!" (w, with Pat Oliffe, one-shot, 2004)
- JSA #67: "The Autopsy" (a, with Geoff Johns, 2005) collected in JSA: Lost (tpb, 208 pages, 2005, ISBN 1-4012-0722-7)
- Rann-Thanagar War (w, with Ivan Reis, 2005):
  - Rann-Thanagar War (collects #1–6, tpb, 144 pages, 2006, ISBN 1-4012-0839-8)
  - Infinite Crisis Companion (includes Infinite Crisis Special, tpb, 168 pages, 2006, ISBN 1-4012-0922-X)
- Thunderbolt Jaxon #1–5 (w, with John Higgins, Wildstorm, 2006) collected as Thunderbolt Jaxon (tpb, 128 pages, 2007, ISBN 1-4012-1257-3)
- Wednesday Comics #1–12: "Kamandi" (w/a, 2009) collected in Wednesday Comics (hc, 200 pages, 2009, ISBN 1-4012-2747-3)
- DC Universe: Legacies #3: "Powers & Abilities" (inks, with Len Wein and José Luis García-López) and "Snapshot: Resurgence!" (a, with Len Wein, co-feature); #4: "The Next Generation" (inks, with Len Wein and José Luis García-López) collected in DCU:Legacies (hc, 336 pages, 2011, ISBN 1-4012-3133-0; tpb, 2012, ISBN 1-4012-3134-9)

==== Vertigo ====
Titles published by DC Comics' Vertigo imprint include:

- Gangland #1: "The Bear" (w/a, 1998) collected in Gangland (tpb, 112 pages, 2000, ISBN 1-56389-608-7)
- Strange Adventures #1: "Riddle of the Random Realities!" (w/a, 1999)
- Hellblazer (w):
  - Vertigo: Winter's Edge #3: "Another Bloody Christmas" (w/a, 2000) collected in City of Demons (tpb, 128 pages, 2011, ISBN 1-4012-3153-5)
  - Hellblazer #250: "Happy New Fucking Year" (with Sean Phillips, 2009)
- Weird Western Tales #1: "Serial Hero" (w/a, 2001)
- War Story: Screaming Eagles (a, with Garth Ennis, one-shot, 2002) collected in War Stories Volume 1 (tpb, 240 pages, 2004, ISBN 1-84023-912-3)
- The Originals (w/a, graphic novel, hc, 160 pages, 2004, ISBN 1-4012-0355-8)
- DMZ #50: "Decade Later, Lower Manhattan" (a, with Brian Wood, 2010) collected in DMZ: M.I.A. (tpb, 128 pages, 2011, ISBN 1-4012-2996-4)
- The Unexpected: "The Great Karlini" (w/a, one-shot, 2011)

=== Marvel Comics ===
Titles published by Marvel and its various imprints include:

- Marvel Fanfare #41: "...Perchance to Dream" (a, with Walt Simonson, 1988)
- Harvey Kurtzman's Strange Adventures: "The Super Surfer" (a, with Harvey Kurtzman, graphic novel, 79 pages, Epic, 1990, ISBN 0-87135-675-9)
- Sensational She-Hulk #50: "He's Dead?!" (a, with John Byrne, among other artists, 1993)
- The Savage Hulk: "Old Friends" (w/a, one-shot, Marvel Edge, 1996)
- Super-Soldier: "Secret of the K-Bomb" (a, with Mark Waid, one-shot, 1996)
- Ultimate Spider-Man Super Special (a, with Brian Michael Bendis, 2002) collected in Ultimate Marvel Team-Up (hc, 448 pages, 2002, ISBN 0-7851-0870-X)
- Captain America #17–20 (w, with Lee Weeks, 2003–2004) collected as Captain America Lives Again! (tpb, 112 pages, 2004, ISBN 0-7851-1318-5)
- The Secret Service #1–7 (a, with Mark Millar, Icon, 2012)

=== Dark Horse Comics ===
Titles published by Dark Horse include:

- The Life and Times of Martha Washington in the Twenty-First Century (hc, 600 pages, 2009, ISBN 1-59307-654-1) collects:
  - Give Me Liberty (a, with Frank Miller, 1990–1991) also collected as Give Me Liberty (tpb, 216 pages, 1992, ISBN 0-440-50446-5)
  - Martha Washington Goes to War #1–5 (a, with Frank Miller, 1994) also collected as MWGTW (tpb, 144 pages, 1996, ISBN 1-56971-090-2)
  - Happy Birthday, Martha Washington (a, with Frank Miller, one-shot, 1995)
  - Martha Washington Stranded in Space (a, with Frank Miller, one-shot, 1995)
  - Martha Washington Saves the World #1–3 (a, with Frank Miller, 1997–1998) also collected as MWSTW (tpb, 112 pages, 1999, ISBN 1-56971-384-7)
  - Martha Washington Dies: "2095" (a, with Frank Miller, one-shot, 2007)
- Andrew Vachss' Hard Looks #1: "Dumping Ground" (w/a, with Andrew Vachss, 1992) collected in Hard Looks (tpb, 144 pages, 1994, ISBN 1-56971-009-0)
- Another Chance to Get It Right (a, with Andrew Vachss, among other artists, graphic novel, 1992)
- Aliens: Salvation (w, with Mike Mignola, one-shot, 1993) collected in Aliens: Salvation and Sacrifice (tpb, 112 pages, 2001, ISBN 1-56971-561-0)
- Star Wars:
  - Vader's Quest (a, with Darko Macan, 1999) collected as SW:VQ (tpb, 96 pages, 2000, ISBN 1-56971-415-0)
  - Chewbacca No. 2 (a, with Darko Macan, Jan Duursema and Dusty Abell, 2000) collected in SW:C (tpb, 96 pages, 2001, ISBN 1-56971-515-7)
- 9-11 Volume 1: "Zero Degrees of Separation" (a, with Randy Stradley, graphic novel, tpb, 196 pages, 2002, ISBN 1-56389-881-0)
- Dark Horse Presents #3: "Treatment" (w/a, 2011)

=== Other US publishers ===
Titles published by various American publishers include:

- Power Comics #1–4 (a, with Don Avenell, Norman Worker and Brian Bolland, Eclipse, 1988)
- Breakthrough: "Boss" (w/a, anthology graphic novel, tpb, 80 pages, Catalan Communications, 1990, ISBN 0-87416-097-9)
- Ray Bradbury Chronicles #2: "Come into My Cellar" (w/a, Byron Preiss Visual Publications, 1992) collected in The Best of Ray Bradbury: The Graphic Novel (tpb, 160 pages, 2003, ISBN 0-7434-7476-7)
- Kitchen Sink:
  - Legends of Arzach No. 3 (a, with Jean-Marc Lofficier, among other artists, 1992) collected in Visions of Arzach (hc, 64 pages, 1993, ISBN 0-87816-233-X)
  - The Spirit: The New Adventures No. 1 (a, with Alan Moore, 1998) collected in Will Eisner's The Spirit Archives Volume 27 (hc, 232 pages, 2009, ISBN 1-56971-732-X)
- Mr. Monster Attacks! #1: "Wish You Were Here" (a, with Michael T. Gilbert, Tundra Publishing, 1992)
- Beneath a Steel Sky (w/a, Computec Verlag, 1994)
- Negative Burn #25: "Chiaroscuro" (a, with Alan Moore, Caliber, 1995) collected in Alan Moore's Songbook (tpb, 64 pages, 1998, ISBN 0-941613-65-8)
- OMNI Comix #3: "T.H.U.N.D.E.R. Agents: Cold Warriors Never Die" (a, with George Caragonne, Tom Thornton and Paul Gulacy, Penthouse Comix, 1995)
- Broken Sword: The Smoking Mirror (w/a, one-shot, Revolution, 2010)
- Rocketeer Adventures #4: "A Day at the Beach" (w, with Scott Hampton, IDW Publishing, 2011) collected in Rocketeer Adventures Volume 1 (hc, 128 pages, 2011, ISBN 1-61377-034-0)

=== Covers only ===
- 2000 AD #81, 127, 175, 187, 194, 205, 207, 241, 549, 1387, Annual '81 and '84 (IPC Media/Fleetway/Rebellion Developments, 1978–2004)
- Doctor Who #1–19 (Marvel, 1984–1986)
- Axel Pressbutton #2 (Eclipse, 1984)
- Amazing Heroes #97, 173 (Fantagraphics Books, 1986–1989)
- 2000 AD Presents vol. 1 #7 (Quality, 1986)
- Rogue Trooper #1–2, 5, 8 (Quality, 1986–1987)
- The Comics Journal #116 (Fantagraphics Books, 1987)
- 2000 AD Presents vol. 2 #15 (Quality, 1987)
- The Transformers #133 (Marvel UK, 1987)
- Action Comics #601, 841–843, 1000, Annual #3 (DC Comics, 1988–2018)
- Adventures of Superman #440, 447 (DC Comics, 1988)
- The Phantom #1–4 (DC Comics, 1988)
- Dragon's Claws #7–10 (Marvel UK, 1989)
- Cheval Noir #32 (Dark Horse, 1992)
- Ray Bradbury Chronicles #1 (Byron Preiss Visual Publications, 1992)
- 1963 #1 (Image, 1993)
- Hardcase #1 (Malibu, 1993)
- The Malibu Sun #26 (Malibu, 1993)
- Dark Horse Presents #100.4 (Dark Horse, 1995)
- Judgment Day (Awesome, 1997)
- Marvel Universe #2 (Marvel, 1998)
- Gangland #4 (Vertigo, 1998)
- Whiteout #3 (Oni Press, 1998)
- Transmetropolitan #16–18 (Vertigo, 1998–1999)
- Martin Mystery #1–3 (Bonelli, 1999)
- Supermen of America #1 (DC Comics, 1999)
- Secret Origins of Super-Villains 80-Page Giant #1 (DC Comics, 1999)
- Silver Age: Teen Titans #1 (DC Comics, 2000)
- Rising Stars #9 (Top Cow, 2000)
- Astounding Space Thrills #4 (Day One, 2000)
- Just a Pilgrim: Garden of Eden #4 (Black Bull, 2002)
- Batman: Gotham Knights #31 (DC Comics, 2002)
- JSA #70–71 (DC Comics, 2005)
- Albion (Wildstorm, 2005–2006)
- Northlanders #3 (Vertigo, 2008)
- Dan Dare #7 (Virgin, 2008)
- The Boys #28 (Dynamite, 2009)
- Blackest Night: Tales of the Corps #1 (DC Comics, 2009)
- DC Universe: Legacies #4 (DC Comics, 2010)
- The CBLDF Presents Liberty Annual '10 (Image, 2010)
- The Authority #27 (Wildstorm, 2011)
- Wildcats #28 (Wildstorm, 2011)
- Turf #5 (Image, 2011)
- Pigs #5 (Image, 2011)
- Supercrooks #1 (Icon, 2012)
- Kingsman: The Red Diamond #1 (Image, variant cover, 2017)

Preceded by Keith Pollard	Green Lantern vol. 2 artist 1983–1985	Succeeded by Joe Staton
Preceded by Chuck Austen	Captain America vol. 4 writer 2003	Succeeded by Robert Morales
Preceded by Joey Cavalieri (vol. 1)	Green Lantern Corps vol. 2; 2006–2007	Succeeded by Peter Tomasi
