= Tony DeZuniga =

Filipino comic book artist (1932-2012)

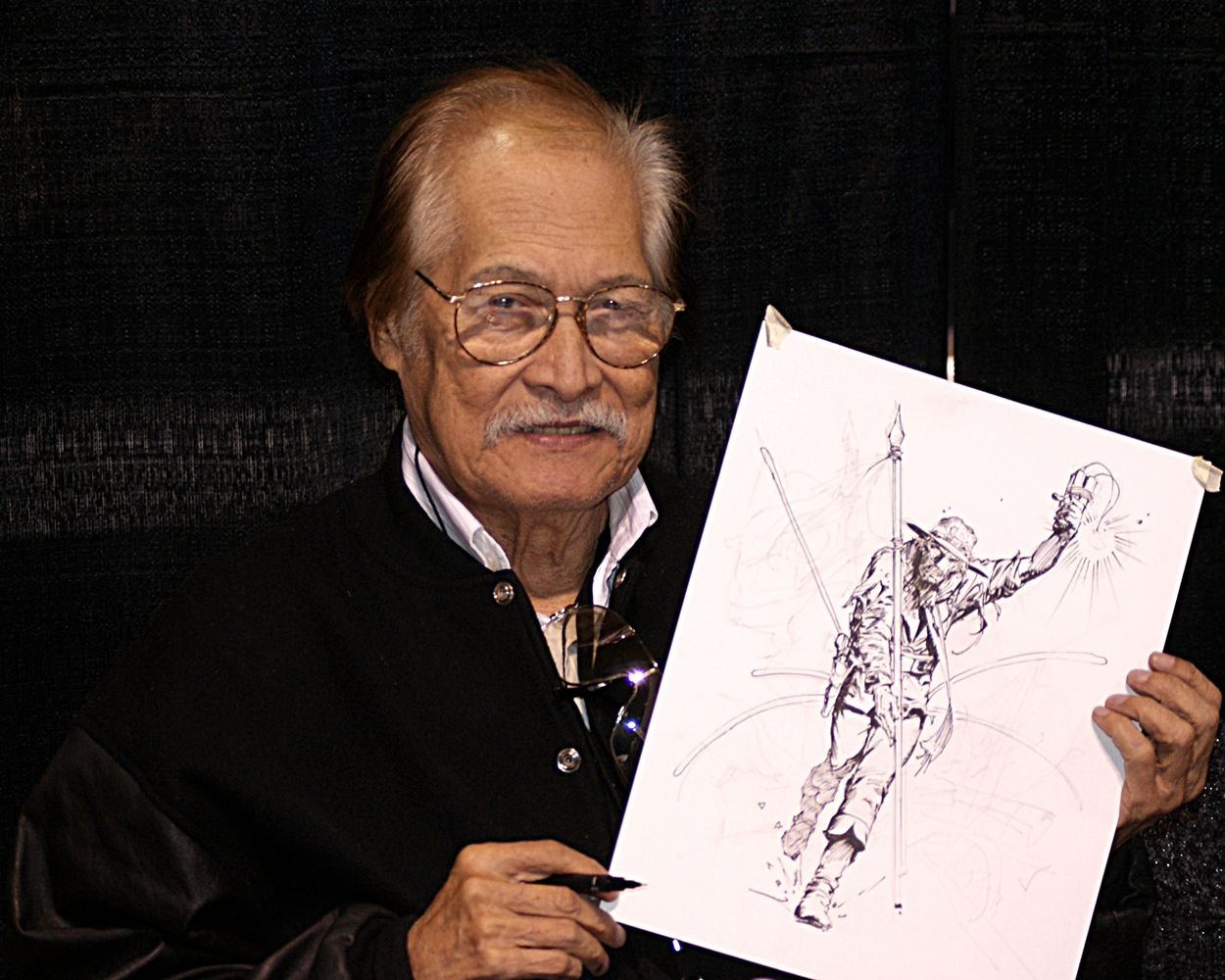
- DeZuniga on June 19, 2011
- Born: Antony de Zuñiga; November 8, 1932 Manila, Philippines
- Died: May 11, 2012 (aged 79) Las Piñas, Philippines
- Areas: Penciller, Inker
- Notable works: Adventure Comics (Black Orchid); Arak, Son of Thunder; Jonah Hex; Weird Western Tales (Jonah Hex)

Antony de Zuñiga (November 8, 1932 – May 11, 2012), who worked primarily under the name Tony DeZuniga, was a Filipino comics artist and illustrator best known for his works for DC Comics. He co-created the fictional characters Jonah Hex and Black Orchid.

DeZuniga was the first Filipino comic book artist whose work was accepted by American publishers, paving the way for many other Filipino artists to enter the international comic book industry.

== Biography ==
=== Early life and career ===
DeZuniga was born in Manila, Philippines, and began his comics career at the age of 16, as a letterer for Liwayway, a Filipino weekly magazine whose contributors included comic book artists Alfredo Alcala and Nestor Redondo, who would later become his mentors.

He eventually received a Bachelor of Science degree in commercial art from the University of Santo Tomas in the Philippines. In 1962, he came to the United States to study graphic design in New York City. He returned to his native country to work in advertising and to freelance for Filipino comics.

When he returned to New York City in the late 1960s, DeZuniga entered the American comic book market under editor Joe Orlando at DC Comics, inking pencil art by Ric Estrada on a romance comics tale for Girls' Love Stories #153 (Aug. 1970). DeZuniga's U.S. debut as a penciler came with a self-inked horror story for House of Mystery #188 (Sept./Oct. 1970).

=== DC and Marvel Comics ===
Weird Western Tales #14 (DC, Nov 1972). Cover art by DeZuniga

DeZuniga became a regular contributor at DC. With writer John Albano, he co-created the long-running western character Jonah Hex, and with Sheldon Mayer the first Black Orchid. DeZuniga served as an introduction to what would be a 1970s influx of Filipino artists to American comics, prompting Orlando and DC publisher Carmine Infantino to visit the Philippines in 1971 to scout talent. Among the artists found there who would soon become mainstays of both DC and Marvel Comics were Alfredo Alcala, Alex Niño, Nestor Redondo, and Gerry Talaoc. He was responsible for the discovery of artist Steve Gan and was Gan's United States art agent in charge of importing his artwork to Marvel from the Philippines. DeZuniga inked John Buscema's penciled artwork for MGM's Marvelous Wizard of Oz (1975). This comics adaptation of the Metro-Goldwyn-Mayer film was the first joint publishing venture between Marvel and DC Comics.

DeZuniga relocated back to New York from the Philippines in 1977. Around this time, DeZuniga formed Action Art Studio, which was a group of New York-based Filipino komiks artists who inked various Marvel Comics titles under the collective pseudonym of "The Tribe." Members included DeZuniga, Alfredo Alcala, and Rudy Nebres, among others. DeZuniga worked for industry leaders Marvel and DC for 18 years.

=== Later career ===
DeZuniga later became a video game conceptual designer, spending a decade with the United States and Japan divisions of Sega. He did freelance work for McGraw Hill and the Scholastic Corporation, and illustrated for TSR's Dungeons & Dragons game in books such as In Search of Dragons. In 1989, he illustrated The DragonLance Saga Book Three, written by Roy Thomas.

Upon retirement, DeZuniga began to do commissioned paintings and to teach art. His work has been the subject of at least one gallery exhibition.

He returned to Jonah Hex with Jonah Hex: No Way Back, a graphic novel released to coincide with the Jonah Hex film.

== Personal life ==
DeZuniga was married three times. He and his wife Mary were co-owners of Action Art Studio in the mid-to-late 1970s. His third wife was named Tina.

=== Illness and death ===
In April 2012, DeZuniga suffered a life-threatening stroke. Doctors were able to save him, but numerous complications quickly arose. Both the Philippine and international comics community made an effort to raise funds for his treatment. During Free Comic Book Day on May 5, 2012, Filipino comic book artists banded together and launched a sketch drive, T-shirt sale and auction to help raise funds.

On May 11, 2012, at 1:25 a.m., DeZuniga died from the stroke having led to his subsequent brain damage and heart failure.

=== Legacy ===
After DeZuniga's death, Marvel Comics issued a statement saying, "Tony DeZuniga stands as a historic figure in comics, a singular voice of his own making. His legacy will be seen and felt in the multitude of fans he leaves behind and the incredible body of work of which he remained justifiably proud to his final days."

== Awards ==
- 1997 Sega President's Award for Excellence
- 2011 Inkpot Award

== Bibliography ==
Most of his work at comics was an inker, except where noted:

=== Archie Comics ===
- All New Adventures of the Mighty Crusaders #3 (inks over Dick Ayers) (1983)
- Blue Ribbon Comics #6 (full art); #3 (inks over Eduardo Barreto); #7 (inks over Dick Ayers) (1983–84)
- Mighty Crusaders #4-6 (inks over Dick Ayers); #5 (inks over Adrian Gonzales); #7 (inks over Rich Buckelr) (1983–84)
- Original Shield #1-2 (inks over Dick Ayers) (1984)

=== DC Comics ===
- Action Comics Weekly (Superman) #601-612 (over Dan Jurgens pencils); (Deadman) #618-621, 623-626 (over Kelley Jones) (1988)
- Adventure Comics (Supergirl) #419–420, 424 (artist); (Black Orchid) #428-430 (artist, 1972–73)
- All-Star Squadron #49-50, 53, 56-61, 64-67 (inks over Mike Harris, Mike Clark, Arvell Jones, Ron Harris, Wayne Boring, Don Heck and Alan Kupperberg); #62 (artist, 1985–87)
- All-Star Western #2, 6-8, 10-11 (artist, 1970–72)
- The Amazing World of DC Comics (Jonah Hex) #13 (four pages, artist, 1976)
- Aquaman: Sword of Atlantis #43 (inks over Jackson Guice, 2006)
- Arak, Son of Thunder #1-4, 31, 35, Annual #1 (over Ernie Colón pencils); #38-44, 46-50 (artist, 1981–85)
- Batman #350–351 (over Gene Colan pencils); (Catwoman) #350 (artist, 1982)
- Dark Mansion of Forbidden Love #1 (artist, 1971)
- DC Comics Presents #53, 60, 70 (over Curt Swan, Irv Novick and Alex Saviuk pencils, 1983–84)
- Detective Comics #517, 523 (over Gene Colan pencils); Annual #1 (over Klaus Janson pencils) (1982–88)
- Elvira's House of Mystery #5 (over Dick Ayers pencils, 1986)
- Forbidden Tales of Dark Mansion #7 (artist, 1972)
- Ghosts #1-3, 40, 102 (full art); #99, 101, 103-104, 112 (inks over Mike R. Adams, Howard Bender, Greg LaRocque, Marc Silvestri and Mark Texeira pencils) (1971–81)
- Girls' Love Stories #160, 168 (artist, 1971–72)
- Heroes Against Hunger #1 (two pages, over Paris Cullins pencils, 1986)
- House of Mystery #188, 191, 193, 200, 216, 253 (full art); #257, 292, 294, 297, 306 (inks over Jerry Grandenetti, Marc Silvestri, George Tuska, Denys Cowan and Greg Curry pencils) (1970–82)
- House of Secrets #93-94, 111, 120 (full art); #92, 99-100 (inks over Alan Weiss, Jack Katz and Mike Sekowsky pencils) (1971–74)
- Infinity, Inc. #10-12, 14-17, 21-31, 33-42, 44, 46-48, 50, Annual #1-2 (over Jerry Ordway and Todd McFarlane pencils, among others, 1985–88)
- Jonah Hex #5, 39, 53-57, 83-88 (full art); #41, 44-52, 58-72, 74-82 (inks over Dick Ayers pencils) (1977–84)
- Jonah Hex, vol. 2, #5, 9 (artist, 2006)
- Jonah Hex: No Way Back, graphic novel (artist, 2010)
- Phantom Stranger, vol. 2, (Dr. 13) #12-16, 18-22, 31, 34 (artist, 1971–75)
- Phantom Zone (Superman miniseries) #1-4 (over Gene Colan pencils, 1982)
- The Saga of the Swamp Thing (Phantom Stranger) #4-5 (artist); Annual #1 (over Mark Texeira pencils, 1982)
- Secret Hearts #152 (artist, 1971)
- Secret Origins, vol. 2, #11, 12, 17 (over Luke McDonnell, Tom Grindberg and Carmine Infantino pencils) (1986–87)
- Secrets of Haunted House #2 (artist, 1975)
- Sinister House of Secret Love #2, 4 (artist, 1971–72)
- Super DC Giant #S-21 (over Ric Estrada pencils, 1971)
- The Unexpected #147 (over Ross Andru pencils, 1973)
- V #1-16 (over Carmine Infantino pencils, 1985–86)
- Vigilante #30 (artist); Annual #2 (over Ross Andru pencils, 1986)
- The Warlord (Arak, Son of Thunder) #48 (over Ernie Colón pencils, 1981)
- Weird Mystery Tales #7-8, 12 (artist, 1973–74)
- Weird War Tales #8, 11-14, 18, 22 (artist, 1972–74)
- Weird Western Tales (Jonah Hex) #12-14, 16-23 (artist, 1972–74)
- The Witching Hour #16, 23 (artist, 1971–72)
- Wonder Woman (Huntress) #302-303 (over Mike DeCarlo pencils, 1983)
- World's Finest Comics #290-291, 293 (over Adrian Gonzales pencils, 1983)
- Young All-Stars #17, 20, Annual #1 (over Michael Bair pencils, 1988)
- Young Love #85, 122 (over Ric Estrada pencils, 1971–76)
- Young Romance #167 (artist); #171 (over Art Saaf pencils), #181 (over Ric Estrada) (1970–72)

=== Marvel Comics ===
- Alpha Flight #55-57 (over Jim Lee pencils, 1988)
- The Amazing Spider-Man #174, 176 (over Ross Andru pencils), Annual #22 (over Ron Lim) (1978–88)
- The Avengers #335 (over Jeff Moore pencils), Annual #17 (over Ron Lim) (1988–91)
- Black Knight #1-2 (artist); #3-4 (inks over Rich Buckler) (1990)
- Captain America #339 (inks over Kieron Dwyer, 1988)
- Captain Justice #2 (inker) (1988)
- Codename: Spitfire #10, 13 (over Marshall Rogers and Dave Hoover, 1987)
- Conan the Barbarian #65-67, 69 (inks over John Buscema); #87, 251 (artist) (1976–91)
- Conan the Barbarian: The Horn of Azoth (over Mike Docherty pencils, 1990)
- Conan the King #47 (artist, 1988)
- D.P. 7 Annual #1 (over Lee Weeks pencils, 1987)
- Daredevil #153 (over Gene Colan pencils); #244-246 (over Louis Williams and Tom Morgan) (1978–87)
- Darkman #2-3 (over Bob Hall pencils, 1990)
- Deadly Hands of Kung Fu #11-12, 24, 28 (inks over George Pérez, Keith Giffen and Joe Staton); #26-27, 30 (artist) (1975–76)
- Doc Savage, vol. 2, #1, 3-4, 7 (inks over John Buscema and Val Mayerik); #2, 5-6 (artist) (1975–76)
- Doctor Strange, Sorcerer Supreme #4, 16-18, 20-22 (inks over Richard Case and Butch Guice); #31 (artist) (1989–91)
- Dracula Lives #8, 10-11, 13 (artist, 1974–75)
- Fallen Angels #8 (over Joe Staton pencils, 1987)
- Fantastic Four #190 (over Sal Buscema pencils); Annual #20-22 (over Paul Neary, Ron Lim and Rich Buckler pencils) (1978–89)
- Foolkiller #1-5 (over J.J. Birch pencils, 1990–91)
- Freddy Krueger's A Nightmare on Elm Street #1-2 (artist, 1989)
- Ghost Rider vol. 2 #25, 29 (over Don Heck and Don Perlin pencils, 1977–78)
- Godzilla #3-4 (over Herb Trimpe and Tom Sutton pencils, 1977)
- The Hulk! #11, 14 (over Gene Colan pencils, 1978)
- Human Fly #8 (over Frank Robbins pencils, 1978)
- The Incredible Hulk #328 (over Dwayne Turner pencils, 1987)
- Iron Man #275 (artist, 1991)
- John Carter, Warlord of Mars #10 (artist), Annual #3 (over Alan Weiss pencils) 1978–79)
- Justice #16-18 (over Lee Weeks pencils) (1988)
- Kickers, Inc. #6-10, 12 (over Rod Whigham and Alan Kupperberg pencils) (1987)
- Man-Thing #15 (1975)
- Marvel Classics Comics #19 (artist, 1977)
- Marvel Fanfare (Shanna the She-Devil) #59 (artist, 1991)
- Marvel Graphic Novel: Conan: The Horn of Azoth (over Mike Docherty pencils, 1990)
- Marvel Graphic Novel: Kull: The Vale of Shadow (artist, 1989)
- Marvel Premiere #27 (artist); #54 (inks over Gene Day pencils) (1975–80)
- Marvel Preview #2-3, 9 (artist); #6, 10, 16, 19 (inks over Val Mayerik, Jim Starlin, Gene Colan and Sal Buscema) (1975–79)
- Marvel Super Action (Punisher) #1 (artist, 1976)
- Marvel Super-Heroes, vol. 2, #3, 5 (inker) (1990-1991)
- Marvel Super Special #5, 9 (over John Romita Sr. and John Buscema pencils, 1978–1979)
- Marvel Team-Up #70 (over John Byrne pencils, 1978)
- Monsters Unleashed (Tigra) #10 (artist, 1975)
- Ms. Marvel #15, 17 (over Jim Mooney pencils, 1978)
- The 'Nam #45-46, 48, 54-58 (over Wayne Vansant pencils, 1990–91)
- Nightmask #4-5, 10-12 (over Ron Wagner, Arvell Jones, Mark Bagley and Kyle Baker pencils, 1987)
- Power Pack #34 (over Louis Williams and Larry Alexander pencils, 1988)
- Psi-Force #15, 19 (over Javier Saltares and Ron Lim pencils, 1988)
- Punisher, vol. 2, #41 (among other inkers), Annual #1 (over Paris Cullins pencils, 1988–90)
- The Punisher War Journal #21 (over Tod Smith pencils, 1990)
- The Rampaging Hulk (Hulk) #6 (over Keith Pollard pencils); (Shanna the She-Devil) #9 (artist) (1978)
- Red Sonja #15 (over John Buscema pencils, 1979)
- Red Sonja, vol. 2, #1 (along with Ernie Colón, 1983)
- Robocop (Magazine) #1 (over Javier Saltares and Alan Kupperberg pencils, 1987)
- Savage Sword of Conan #1, 3, 181, 192-195 (artist); #5, 14, 26-27, 31-32, 38-46, 49-52, 56-58, 171, 177, 190 (inks over John Buscema, Neal Adams, Sal Buscema, Ernie Colón, Dave Hoover, Luke McDonnell and Mike Doherty) (1974–92)
- Savage Tales (Ka-Zar) #6-8 (inks over John Buscema pencils); (Shanna the She-Devil) #9 (artist) (1975)
- The Secret Defenders #15-17, 19-25 (over Jerry Decaire and Bill Wylie pencils, 1994–95)
- Silver Surfer Annual #1 (over Paris Cullins pencils, 1988)
- The Spectacular Spider-Man Annual #8 (artist, 1988)
- Spider-Woman #1-5 (over Carmine Infantino pencils, 1978)
- Spitfire and the Troubleshooters #5-9 (over Herb Trimpe, Vince Giarrano and Alan Kupperberg pencils, 1987)
- Strange Tales #176-177 (artist, 1974)
- Strikeforce: Morituri #21-22, 25 (over Huw Thomas and John Calimee pencils, 1988–89)
- Tales of the Zombie #10 (1975)
- Tarzan #3-6, 11 (over John Buscema pencils, 1977–78)
- Thor #248-253, 256-260, 262-264, 266-271, 394; Annual #5, 8 (over John Buscema, Walt Simonson and Bob Hall pencils); #255, 404-406 (artist) (1976–89)
- Vampire Tales #8-9 (artist, 1974–75)
- Web of Spider-Man Annual #4 (over Ron Lim pencils, 1988)
- West Coast Avengers, vol. 2, #32, Annual #3 (over Al Milgrom and Ron Lim pencils, 1988)
- X-Factor Annual #3 (over Paris Cullins pencils, 1988)
- X-Men #110 (artist); Annual #12 (inks over Ron Lim pencils) (1978–88)

=== Marvel Comics / DC Comics ===
- MGM's Marvelous Wizard of Oz #1 (over John Buscema pencils, 1975)
