= Vader's Quest =

Star Wars comic series

Publication information
- Publishing company: Dark Horse Comics
- Subject: Star Wars
- Genre: Science fiction
- Release date: 17 February 1999
- Country: United States
- Language: English
- No. of pages: 22 each

Expanded Universe
- Era: Rebellion
- Galactic Year: 0 ABY
- Canon: C

Creative team
- Script writer: Darko Macan
- Cover artist: Dave Gibbons
- Penciller: Dave Gibbons
- Inker: P. Craig Russell
- Colorist: Angus McKie
- Publisher: Mike Richardson

Vader's Quest is a four-issue comic book miniseries set in the Star Wars Expanded Universe, written by Darko Macan and drawn by Dave Gibbons and Angus McKie. Published by Dark Horse Comics, the original four issues appeared in February through May 1999; a trade paperback reprinting all four was released in December of that same year.

Together, the four covers of the individual issues form a tetraptych, which is printed in the trade paperback. They focus on, from left to right, Darth Vader, Palpatine, Jal Te Gniev, and Luke Skywalker.

== Synopsis ==
Soon after the events of the original Star Wars film, the Sith Lord Darth Vader has hired bounty hunters to find out who was responsible for the destruction of the Death Star. At the Museum of the Old Republic, Thurlow Harris, a captured and tortured Rebel pilot, who survived the Death Star battle and returned to his homeworld of Centares, betrays the pilot's surname: Skywalker. Vader attempts to kill every bounty hunter (including Brazzo, Selle, and Ban Papeega) who hears this revelation, but one, Mala Mala, escapes and heads to Coruscant to tell Palpatine the name in exchange for protection from Vader, after both of her droids 4-D and B-6 were destroyed. Rebel pilot Jal Te Gniev, who is envious and resentful of Luke, tells Nevana, a Dubravan woman in a cantina, on Dubrava that Luke will be on Jazbina; not knowing anything about Luke besides that he is a wanted man, she then sells this information to Sarma, an Imperial-connected bounty hunter in exchange for forgiving her father's debt. Vader pursues Luke and comes face to face with him for the first time on Jazbina (where Jal has also journeyed to warn Luke and redeem himself) but the decidedly anti-Imperial Jazbinan locals force him to leave, saving Luke.

== Continuity ==
Vader previously met Luke face to face in the 1978 novel sequel to the original film, Splinter of the Mind's Eye, though this book became largely non-canonical with the release of a full-fledged sequel in the form of The Empire Strikes Back (1980).

The unnamed Rebel pilot who betrays Skywalker's name was later revealed to be Thurlow Harris from the video game Star Wars: Rebel Assault (1993).

== Collections ==
- Omnibus: Early Victories (2008)
- Marvel Epic Collection: Star Wars – The Rebellion, Vol. 1 (2016)
