= Jonah Hex =

American comic book character

- Cover art of Jonah Hex Vol. 3 #3 (2011) by Jordi Bernet and Rob Schwager

Publication information
- Publisher: DC Comics
- First appearance: All-Star Western #10 (Feb.–Mar. 1972)
- Created by: John Albano (writer); Tony DeZuniga (artist)

In-story information
- Full name: Jonah Woodson Hex
- Team affiliations: Apache and Navajo tribes Confederate States Army; United States Army; Kiowa tribes Five Warriors from Forever; Black Lantern Corps
- Notable aliases: The Mark of the Demon
- Abilities: Outstanding marksman; Peak physical conditioning; Expert hand-to-hand combatant; Master tracker and detective; Honed a danger sense from years of training and experience
Hex
- Hex #1, 1985. Mark Texeira and Klaus Janson, artists.
Publication information
- Publisher: DC Comics
- Schedule: Bimonthly; Monthly
- Format: Ongoing series
- Genre: Western, Gothic Western
- Publication date: March/April 1977 – October 2011
- No. of issues: (vol. 1) 92 (Hex) 18 (vol. 2) 70
- Main character: Jonah Hex
Creative team
- Written by: Michael Fleisher, Joe R. Lansdale, Justin Gray, Jimmy Palmiotti
- Artist: Tony DeZuniga
- Penciller(s): José Luis García-López, Dick Ayers
- Inker: Romeo Tanghal
- Editor: Ross Andru
Collected editions
- Showcase Presents: Jonah Hex, Vol. 1: ISBN 1-4012-0760-X
- Showcase Presents: Jonah Hex, Vol. 2: ISBN 1-4012-1561-0

Jonah Woodson Hex is a fictional antihero appearing in American comic books published by DC Comics. The character was created by writer John Albano and artist Tony DeZuniga. Hex is a surly and cynical bounty hunter whose face is scarred on the right side. Despite his poor reputation and personality, Hex is bound by a personal code of honor to protect and avenge the innocent.

Hex has been substantially adapted in other media, including animated television series and films. Bill McKinney, Adam Baldwin, Phil Morris, and Thomas Jane, among others, have voiced the character in animation. Furthermore, Josh Brolin and Johnathon Schaech portray Hex in a self-titled film and Legends of Tomorrow respectively.

== Publication history ==
=== Debut ===
The character first appeared in a full-page in-house ad for All-Star Western #10 which was published in various November/December 1971-dated DC comics, including a few of DC's war comics line, as well as a half-page version of the same house ad in Batman #237. This house ad contains the first published images of Jonah Hex, as well as two dialogue-filled comic strip panels not used in his first full-story appearance.

His first full-story appearance was published a few weeks later in volume two of All-Star Western #10 (February–March 1972), which was renamed Weird Western Tales with its twelfth issue. Jonah Hex headlined the new title through issue #38, at which point Scalphunter took over the spotlight while Jonah Hex moved into his own self-titled series in 1977. The series lasted for 92 issues with Michael Fleisher as the main writer and Tony DeZuniga providing much of the art.

In a 2010 interview with Filipino journalist Anna Valmero, DeZuniga described the moment he first conceived the image that would become Jonah Hex:

When I went to my doctor, I saw this beautiful chart of the human anatomy. And I saw the anatomy of the figure was split in half, straight from head to toe. Half his skeleton was there, half his nerves and muscles. That's where I got the idea it won't be too bad if his distortion would be half.

=== Hex ===
Jonah Hex was canceled during the publication of the mini-series Crisis on Infinite Earths—in which Jonah appeared, along with Scalphunter and other western heroes, in issue #3—but in the same year Jonah moved to a new eighteen-issue series titled Hex, also penned by Michael Fleisher. In a bizarre turn of events, Hex found that he had been transported to the 21st century and became somewhat of a post-apocalyptic warrior, reminiscent of Mad Max. The series had mediocre success in the United States but was critically acclaimed and well received in Great Britain, Italy, Spain and Japan.

=== Limited series ===
Three Jonah Hex miniseries have been published under DC's Vertigo imprint. These series, written by Joe R. Lansdale and penciled by Tim Truman and inked by Sam Glanzman, fit more into the western-horror genre, as Hex interacts with zombies ("Two-Gun Mojo" #1–5, 1993), a Cthulhoid monster ("Riders of the Worm and Such" #1–5, 1995) and spirit people ("Shadows West" #1–3, 1999).

=== Jonah Hex vol. 2 ===
A new monthly Jonah Hex series debuted in November 2005 (cover date January 2006), written by Justin Gray and Jimmy Palmiotti with interior art by varying (and occasionally recurring) artists. In assorted postings on their message board, Gray and Palmiotti have stated their intent was to depict various adventures from across the full length of Hex's life and career. The main artistic difference is that the series is published without the external restraints of the Comics Code Authority which allows for harder-edged stories without having to keep with the Vertigo imprint's dark fantasy themes. Tony DeZuniga, the original Hex artist, returned to pencil two issues of the book (#5 and #9). John Higgins drew issue #28 and J. H. Williams III provided the art for Jonah Hex #35, expressing an interest in doing more: "I certainly want to do more issues myself or even a graphic novel if the opportunity and schedule presented itself."

To coincide with the release of the film Gray and Palmiotti wrote an original graphic novel, No Way Back, illustrated by Tony DeZuniga.

=== All-Star Western vol. 3 ===
In September 2011, The New 52 rebooted DC's continuity. With this change, Jonah Hex volume 2 was canceled and Jonah transitioned as the lead story in All-Star Western volume 3 (November 2011). While Jonah Hex vol. 2 consisted of standalone stories, All-Star Western features an ongoing story arc that finds Jonah in Gotham City during the 1880s, teamed up with Amadeus Arkham.

== Fictional character biography ==
=== Origins ===
Born on November 1, 1838, in northwestern Missouri to Woodson and Virginia Hex, Jonah and his mother were regular victims of physical abuse inflicted by his father, an alcoholic. Virginia eventually left Woodson with a traveling salesman, planning to return for Jonah after becoming established elsewhere, though she ultimately became a prostitute to survive. 1851, Woodson sold his son as a slave to a local Apache tribe. They worked him constantly until he saved their chieftain from a puma; in gratitude, the chief took Jonah as his adopted son, but this angered his own son, Noh-Tante. Noh-Tante shared Jonah's affections for a young girl named White Fawn, so he betrayed his adopted brother during their manhood rite at the age of 16 and left Jonah to die at the hands of a party of Kiowa Indians. A patrol of American cavalrymen came to his aid, but when they saw him trying to help the Kiowa, the soldiers shot him as well. Jonah survived only when an old trapper scavenging the site found him clinging to life and nursed him back to health. Returning to his tribe's camp, he found that they had already left, leaving him without a family once again.

=== American Civil War ===
Jonah eventually returned to American civilization, becoming a cavalry scout in the United States Army. When the Civil War broke out in 1861, Jonah, feeling that the South was justified in seeking independence, joined the Confederate States Army and earned a commission as a lieutenant in the 4th Cavalry. It was during this time that he made his first friend, a fellow-soldier named Jeb Turnbull. Various battles Hex is mentioned as having fought in include Manassas, Shiloh, Antietam, Chancellorsville, Vicksburg, Gettysburg, Chattanooga, and Chickamagua.

As time went on, Hex found himself increasingly torn – he had become close with many of his fellow-Confederates, but having once been a slave himself, he was unwilling to fight for the preservation of slavery. In January 1863, after learning about the Emancipation Proclamation, Jonah made up his mind and decided to surrender. He deserted his post and went to the nearest Union camp, Fort Charlotte, sneaking into the commander's quarters to surrender directly. He refused to tell the commander where his unit was stationed, but one of his aides was able to determine their location by studying the clay from the shoes of Jonah's horse. The Confederates were caught by surprise, and all of them were captured. The commander, humiliated by Jonah easily penetrating the fort's poor security, falsely praised him for his "assistance" in the attack. Hex punched him and was sentenced to solitary confinement.

Jonah discovered a shaft beneath his cell and used it to find where his comrades were being held. With Jeb's help, he rallied them and worked out a plan to use the shaft to sneak all of them out. What Hex did not realize was that the "escape tunnel" was a trap. The commander had run out of food to feed his captives, and had ordered the shaft to be dug in secret knowing that the prisoners would use it to try and escape. In an event that came to be known as the "Fort Charlotte Massacre", Union soldiers ambushed and gunned down nearly all of the fleeing Confederates, including Jeb. Jonah was shot himself, but managed to kill the treacherous commander before escaping. A handful of survivors, believing that Hex had betrayed them, returned home and told everyone they could find that Jonah Hex was a murderer and a traitor.

Now hunted by both sides, Jonah patched himself up and moved out toward the Western territories to start over, though given his participation in later battles he evidently rejoined the Confederate Army. His grandson Woodson Hex wrote that Hex surrendered twice in the War. In the Battle of Chancellorsville Hex was the soldier who accidentally shot Stonewall Jackson and since then annually visited his grave. Hex continued to fight in the war until the end of the war, surrendering a second time on April 23, 1865, at the Federal Stockade at Lynchburg, Virginia.

=== Mark of the Demon ===
Jonah came across his old tribe and found that Noh-Tante had since married White Fawn. He revealed Noh-Tante's betrayal to the chieftain, but the accusations were denied and it was decided that they would settle their dispute through combat. Noh-Tante sabotaged Jonah's tomahawk so it would break, forcing Jonah to stab him with a knife. Enraged that Jonah had killed his son and broken the rules of combat, the chieftain had him restrained and disfigured with the "mark of the demon" by scarring the right side of his face with a heated tomahawk. With the mark serving as proof of his wickedness, Jonah was banished from the tribe. Years later, when he and his partner Henri d'Aubergnon sought to rescue a white woman held captive by the tribe, Jonah saw the man he once considered his "true father" shoot White Fawn for trying to protect him. Without hesitation, he gunned down the elderly chieftain and slaughtered most of the Apaches.

=== Bounty-hunter ===
Hex soon took up drinking to deal with the pain of his tribe's betrayal. One day, he stumbled out of a saloon to see a man beating his wife. Believing that the man was his father, Woodson Hex, Jonah shot him. A lawman informed him that the man was, in fact, Lucas "Mad Dog" McGill, an outlaw with a massive bounty on his head that no one had dared try to collect. Acknowledging that Hex had drawn his gun faster than any man he'd ever seen, the deputy gave him the bounty. Intrigued by the idea that he could get paid for killing bad men, Hex scattered his reward on the streets as he rode out of town. He then picked up his first job: hunting down an old army buddy named Eddie Cantwell. The job quickly went south when Hex was intercepted by Arbee Stoneham, a veteran manhunter who killed Cantwell, disarmed Hex, and stole his guns. Eight years later, they met again after Hex brought in the Jason Crowley gang and collected their bounties. He then found Stoneham, who uses a wheelchair after losing the use of his legs. Although he was tempted to take revenge, Hex instead shared a drink with Stoneham and left him in peace.

Hex was then hired by the town of Paradise Corners to kill the outlaw "Big" Jim. Hex grew fond of the town and decided to settle there, but the locals, disgusted by his appearance, forced him to leave. He rescued a man named Terry White from starvation in the desert and saved his life, but when White stole from him and fled, Hex hunted him down and killed him.

=== Weird Western Tales ===
Jonah befriended a wolf named Iron Jaws when he failed to stop white settlers from slaughtering the peaceful band of Pawnee Indians who had owned him. Gunfighter Windy Taylor, who had taught Hex everything he knew about shooting, asked him to help find his son, Tod Taylor, who had turned outlaw. Tod gunned down his father and Hex was forced to kill him. Iron Jaws died after venturing into the desert to rescue Hex after two criminals tied him up and left him to die of exposure. Hex dealt with a corrupt sheriff defrauding his constituents in one town, and then a corrupt hanging judge at the next. He was hired by the manager of a sideshow attraction to act as his bodyguard, then murdered the man when he tried to frame him for a heinous crime. Finding an escaped psychopath on the run, he killed the man after learning that he was a famous murderer known as the "Gentleman Killer". Fort Lang was seemingly attacked by an Indian tribe, but Hex saved them after uncovering a conspiracy by railroad interests to force them off their land so it could be illegally seized. When some bandits Hex had been pursuing injured an old lady who had shown him kindness, he paid for her medical treatment before chasing down and butchering the men who had hurt her.

During a hunt for criminal Blackjack Jorgis, Hex was ambushed by ex-Confederates sent by Quentin Turnbull, father of his deceased friend Jeb. Hex escaped death, but his friend and mentor, Hank Brewster, was shot dead and his first horse, the General, was killed by stray bullets. Briefly hired by the U.S. Secret Service, he toppled an assassination conspiracy against Ulysses S. Grant. Temporarily blinded from his injuries, he managed to take down an entire gang without his sight. He fought corrupt army officials in league with a greedy landowner who was organizing robbers to prey on travelling pioneers, and avenged the victims they had left to die.

=== Five Warriors from Forever ===
The Lord of Time assembled a team, known as the Five Warriors from Forever, when he believed that his time-machine, the Eternity Brain, would end all existence. This team included Jonah Hex alongside Black Pirate, Enemy Ace, Miss Liberty, and the Viking Prince; to make them powerful enough to become a threat, they were each energized with a special force. Their purpose was to fight the Justice League and Justice Society to strengthen their resolve through defeat, which they succeeded in doing. Eventually, the Five Warriors rebelled against their master and assaulted the Palace of Eternity. Hex got into a gun-fight with a T-Rex, but he and his teammates were defeated and eventually returned to their own times using the Cosmic Treadmill.

He later encountered the Justice League separately, with several other Western heroes including Bat Lash, Cinnamon, and Scalphunter. The Lord of Time sent members of the League back to the 19th century as part of an absurd plot to rule the world. Jonah met an amnesiac Hal Jordan in the desert and nursed him back to health. The two teamed up with Elongated Man, Flash, and Zatanna to take down some robotic gunfighters while the League dealt with an anti-matter asteroid that threatened to destroy the Earth. In the present, Superman defeated the Time Lord and restored things to normal.

=== Family ===
Hex married a Chinese immigrant, Mei Ling, who made him promise to give up bounty hunting and violence. However, on at least one occasion Hex returned to bounty hunting to pay the mortgage on their farm after their corn crop caught fire. Together they had a son named Jason. Hex also hired a neighbor's son as a farmhand, and while teaching him to shoot Jason was stung by a scorpion. While treating him the farmhand was kidnapped by old rivals who mistook him for Hex's son. Hex went to rescue the farm boy, much to the outrage of Mei Ling who took Jason and left Hex. Afterwards, Hex returned to bounty hunting though he briefly encountered Mei Ling again. As an adult Jason tracked down his aging father, told him Mei Ling died, but Hex was uninterested in further reunion. He then bumped into a woman with a child, not realized it was Jason's wife and son, and Jason told his wife Hex was no one. Jason's son Woodson Hex later wrote a biography of Jonah Hex.

=== Crisis on Infinite Earths ===
Hex became involved in the first Crisis when he was summoned, along with several other heroes, to fight for the Monitor. Jonah Hex fought against the Shadow Demons alongside Bat Lash, Cyborg, Firebrand, John Stewart, Johnny Thunder, Nighthawk, Psimon, and Scalphunter. Alex Luthor and Harbinger gathered the heroes of several Earths to discuss strategy, and Hex was present in the crowd to witness Pariah's warnings.

=== Hex ===
Jonah Hex disappeared in a flash of light one night at a saloon in 1875. He was abducted from his own era by the villainous Reinhold Borsten (and with unintentional help from Access), who transported him into a post-apocalyptic Seattle, Washington in the 21st century. His intention was to force the legendary Hex to fight for him, but instead Jonah escaped and met a motorcycle gang named the Road Reapers. They immediately took him in after he rescued their warrior Stiletta, and he obtained a zonesuit to protect himself from radiation by killing their cowardly leader, Falcon, in self-defense. His next companions were a group of time-travelers, a unit of soldiers from the Vietnam War; the group was betrayed by a robotic duplicate of Stiletta and none survived except for a Cpt. Stanley Harris. Hex took a job as a guard for a drug dealer named Barnaby Blossom. When he discovered that Barnaby was getting kids hooked, he killed the man. The real Stiletta tracked him down, and they became stranded in the desert together without water after a roadside ambush. They survived by walking twelve miles to an oasis and fighting off killer mutant worms. Having attracted negative attention from the underworld organization known as the Conglomerate by disrupting their drug operations, Hex and Stiletta were hunted down by a mercenary named Chain, who they defeated in a confrontation in a junkyard. The Conglomerate then changed tactics, enlisting Hex to help them take down Borsten, and he allowed himself to be captured by Borsten in a fight, planning to use his time-travel technology to return home. Stiletta and Harris broke into Borsten's complex to help him and Harris was sent home, but the equipment was destroyed before Hex could use it. He and Stiletta escaped as the building exploded, and Borsten apparently died in the blast.

Resigned to his fate, Hex got his hands on more advanced guns after he won a competition at a dangerous live-shooting gallery, but Stiletta was abducted and seemingly killed while he was distracted. He was then captured by a scientist named Dr. Adamant who planned to convert Hex into a cyborg for his "utopia" of artificial life, but Hex escaped and wiped him out along with his creations. His next challenge was an anti-sin cult called the Sin Killers, whom he dealt with while rescuing the kidnapped daughter of a local man. Borsten was later revealed to have survived the explosion. Briefly, Jonah met the Legion of Super-Heroes while they were travelling in their Time Bubble.

New York City's leading crime syndicate, the Combine, sent Hex after their greatest enemy, the Batman, by framing him for Stiletta's murder; the two men fought and nearly killed each other. Realizing that they were on the same side, Hex helped Batman stop the Combine from unleashing their war machines on the innocents of the city. Stiletta was discovered to still be alive, having been brainwashed and trained as a professional wrestler, under the name "Blonde Spitfire". Briefly, Jonah was captured by two cannibals and forced to escape through the sewers. He then began hunting down members of the Combine. The Road Reapers were captured by a group of warriors called the Dogs of War, who pressed them into slave labor for their master, an alien named S'ven Tarah. Jonah was forced to fight Stiletta, but he was able to free her from her wrestler persona after knocking her out.

Tarah revealed that he was also a time-traveller and that his slave camps were building a machine to thwart an alien invasion from the Xxggs. Hex was attacked by his old enemy Chain again in revenge for their last battle, but defeated him a second time. Having been made a slave by Tarah's ally Manta, Hex organized his fellow-captives to escape and fought an enforcer named Starkad on his way out. Stanley Harris revealed that he was actually one of the Dogs of War, and enlisted Jonah's service. They fought against the Xxggs for the future of humanity and succeeded, but Tarah admitted that he was unable to return Hex to 1875. Hex chose to spend Thanksgiving Day with Stiletta. They went to a long-abandoned amusement park, where Hex found his own stuffed corpse in a display. Realizing that the body was from his own time in the past, Hex found comfort knowing that someday he would get to go home.

=== Two-Gun Mojo ===
Jonah Hex met another bounty-hunter, Slow Go Smith, who became his friend and partner. Smith was killed by gun-toting zombies in a barn, and Hex was framed for his murder. Fleeing from the law, Hex investigated the origins of the zombies and learned that they were given life by snake oil merchant Doc "Cross" Williams. Williams, using his knowledge of voodoo from his travels in Haiti, had created an army of the dead to serve him, even reanimating the corpse of Wild Bill Hickok to be his personal bodyguard. Cross sought to do the same to Hex, but he escaped and confronted the Doc. Jonah put Hickok down again by beating him on the draw, then avenged his friend by leaving Williams to die a slow, brutal death at the hands of the Apaches whose dead he had desecrated.

=== Riders of the Worm and Such ===
After killing outlaw Stove Belly Jack and wiping out his gang, Hex met a giant worm in the desert. He teamed up with the inhabitants of a local ranch who'd been under attack by the creatures. It turned out that the monsters were actually sentient, the half-bred rape children of an underground race and a human woman, and that they called themselves the Autumn Brothers. Hex rallied the ranchers to take the offensive. He led them in an assault on the tunnel system where the rest of the worms lived, slaughtering them as they went and blowing up their queen with dynamite.

=== Shadows West ===
Jonah became a member of Buffalo Will's travelling Wild West Show after a trick-shooting midget named Long Tom saved his life. He reconnected with an old friend named Spotted Balls and met a local prostitute who gave birth to a Bear Boy. She claimed to have given birth after mating with a bear spirit. Hex decided to leave the camp with Spotted Balls and the squaw because he did not like the way things were run and feared that Will would try to exploit the Bear Boy. This infuriated the showman, who sent an armed posse led by Long Tom after them. Jonah killed most of his pursuers using carefully set traps, but Spotted Balls died in the final shootout. He was able to return the mother and her cub to its father and his spirit people. Returning to Will's camp with Long Tom's corpse, he swore to the corrupt promoter that if he ever saw him again he would kill him.

=== Face Full of Violence ===
When a rich family hired him to track down their kidnapped son, Hex found the boy had become part of an underground dog-fighting ring and was forced to put him down when he contracted rabies. In a conflict involving a stolen gold crucifix, he burned an entire mining town to the ground. Bat Lash, a travelling gambler and vigilante, helped him take revenge against a corrupt lawman who tried to frame him. The mayor of a small town tried to have Hex hanged as a rapist to hide the incestuous rape of his mute daughter, but the townspeople lynched the politician instead when they learned the truth. While escorting a bounty on Christmas Day, he got into a gunfight, killing a dozen men who wanted to murder his quarry. In the town of Salvation, he met a local gang who disguised themselves as nuns to hide from the law; Hex took them down when they tried to kill him.

=== Death ===
Jonah Hex continued to work as a bounty-hunter until he retired at the age of 66 in 1904, having settled down with a Native American woman named Tall Bird. By then he was a living legend, with others amazed to see the greatest gunman of the Old West still alive in an era of airplanes and automobiles. A journalist, Michael Wheeler, visited Hex to write his biography. The entertainer L.B. Farnham also showed up, offering Hex a great deal of money to star in his "Wild West Revue" show, but Hex angrily turned him down, not wanting to spend his final years as a carnival attraction. Hex's last bounty was the gang of bank robber George Barrow; Barrow survived, and swore revenge. Playing cards in a Cheyenne saloon, Hex was murdered by Barrow with a double-barreled shotgun while fumbling to put on his spectacles. His death was immediately avenged by his friend, sheriff Hank Crawford, who gunned down the unarmed Barrow in cold blood. In his dying moments, Hex reflected on the life that he had lived.

Tall Bird and Wheeler attempted to give Jonah a proper Native American burial, but they were robbed at gunpoint by Farnham and an accomplice. Farnham had Wheeler shot and set fire to Tall Bird's house, leaving her to die. Hex's body was given to a taxidermist to be put in a gaudy outfit for display; Farnham and his associate were both killed by the "accidental" discharge (at point-blank range) of Jonah's hair-trigger guns while setting up the display and thieves stole the body after recognizing Hex. For years, the corpse changed hands and was moved by various owners, before finally ending up as a dummy at a Western-style theme park. Tall Bird was then revealed to have survived the fire; now an old woman, she protected her husband's body from further violation by claiming it for burial. While speaking with a young historian to fill in the missing details of Hex's life, a corrupt Western memorabilia collector threatened them, hoping to take the body for himself. The evil collector suddenly died after being shot from behind, and it is implied that Hex's vengeful spirit returned to protect his wife from beyond the grave.

=== Post mortem ===
Many years later, a supermodel and actress who happened to have the surname Hex seemed to become possessed when her right eye was cut out by members of a group called the Agenda. She assisted Superboy and displayed psionic powers when she repeatedly fired an unloaded energy weapon, but this change in consciousness seems to have been temporary. Eventually, she decided to become a bounty-huntress like her predecessor, using Grokk the Living Gargoyle as a steed.

Jonah Hex was reanimated during Blackest Night as a zombie member of the Black Lantern Corps, wielding a power ring. He returned to plague Quentin Turnbull's descendant Joshua. Joshua attacked Hex with a rocket launcher, but failed to destroy him. The young man pleaded for his life to Hex, joined by a Black Lantern version of Quentin who kills Joshua in cold blood. Hex and Quentin are killed when Hal Jordan defeats Nekron.

=== The New 52 ===
During the 1880s in The New 52, psychologist Amadeus Arkham is recruited by Detective Lofton of the Gotham City Police Department to help solve the case of the Gotham Butcher. GCPD chief John Cromwell finds Arkham's theories of the crime repugnant, as well as his decision to recruit Jonah Hex, who had recently caused a stir by coming to town. Even so, recognizing Hex's experience as a tracker, Arkham suggests that the two of them join forces, performing a separate investigation into the case. Together, they uncover Gotham City's sect of the Religion of Crime, and its relation to the Butcher case. The solution of the Butcher case (revealed to be a conspiracy by several prominent Gotham citizens belonging to the Religion Of Crime) was simply the first of many dangerous cases the two approached in their partnership. During his time in Gotham, Hex runs afoul of the Court of Owls, Vandal Savage, and Dr. Jekyll and Mr. Hyde. He also rekindles his love affair with Tallulah Black, another bounty-hunter.

After ending things with Arkham and preparing to return to the western territories, Hex encounters a semi-amnesiac Booster Gold and is accidentally thrown into the 21st century where he is initially put in Arkham Asylum, believed to be a delusional imposter who has adopted the identity of the historical Jonah Hex. After taking the current administrator, Dr. Jeremiah Arkham, hostage to escape the asylum, he convinces Jeremiah that he is indeed the same Jonah Hex who knew his great-grandfather, and after helping to take down a crazed gunman attacking a crowd of people, secures the legal assistance of Bruce Wayne to get released from custody. He also meets and forms a relationship with a young woman named Gina.

After several adventures where Hex encounters other heroes such as John Constantine, Swamp Thing, and Superman while trying to find a way back home, Hex is horrified when he and Gina discover his preserved corpse on permanent display in a Wild West exhibition at the Metropolis Museum. Despodent and depressed, Hex is involved in a severe DUI accident that leaves him in a coma for over a month. Upon awakening, he finds that the doctors used 21st century medical technology to repair his ruined face and eye along with his injuries from the accident. Discharged from the hospital, Hex and Gina encounter Booster Gold, who is eager to undo his mistake. Although Hex tries to dissuade her, Gina insists on travelling with him to the 19th century. She soon dies while crossing the desert, and all Hex can do is bury her and move on.

Soon after, Hex once again meets Tellulah Black, and discovers that he has been missing for about a year, during which time another man with similar injuries as his original appearance has taken on Hex's identity and has been using his notoriety to commit crimes and form his own gang. Realizing that this is the same man whose preserved body he saw in the future, Hex adopts the identity of "George Barrow", the man who has been on record as Hex's killer, and kills "Hex" before letting a pair of carnival showmen run off with the body. He and Tallulah then ride off into the sunset together.

=== DC Rebirth ===
A robotic/alien version of Jonah Hex appears on a planet called Leone-5, modeled after the Wild West. He is introduced in the mini-series Adventures of the Super Sons, issue 9.

Jonah Hex made a brief appearance in the Batman Universe series.

He also is mentioned a few times by his great-great-granddaughter, Virginia "Jinny" Hex, who appears in Batman Universe and Young Justice, having taken up a career as a hero after learning that she inherited her ancestor's exceptional abilities.

== Powers and abilities ==
In most of his stories, Jonah Hex displays no supernatural or superhuman powers; however, he does possess some exceptional abilities, acquired through a combination of talent and training.

Despite being blind in his right eye on account of his disfigurement, Hex is an outstanding marksman who rarely misses his target, having been trained by the legendary Windy Taylor. He is extremely fast on the draw and can be seen in many stories gunning down multiple foes before any of them can get off a shot, and can wield two guns at the same time with equal proficiency. He is also a resourceful combatant, often relying on stealth, tricks, and improvised weapons and traps to defeat enemies, similar to DC comics character Deathstroke (who is also blind in his right eye). His reflexes are strong enough that he has proven to be faster on the draw than both Wild Bill Hickok and Batman. Already an experienced horseman, Hex became an expert at driving various motor vehicles during his time in the 21st century.

In the DC Universe, he is known as having almost superhuman-levels of skill and marksmanship with 19th-century weapons, such as revolvers and double-barrel shotguns. After Jonah Hex is transported to the future in Hex, he acquires a pair of Ruger Blackhawk .357 Magnums, largely because they are single action revolvers of the kind that he's familiar with. Even with such outdated weapons, he still manages to outshoot foes armed with more modern weaponry.

Hex is a tracker, able to follow trails several days old through rain and mud in spite of his quarry's best efforts to cover their tracks. He possesses a danger sense which warns him of ambushes and traps. This is not a supernatural ability, but rather an instinct honed through years of experience as a bounty-hunter and by fighting enemies much more powerful and deadlier than himself. Hex is also extremely tough and has been known to continue fighting even after suffering torture or severe injury.

Jonah Hex has a reputation throughout the West as a ruthless and prolific killer, but like Batman, he is bound by a personal code of honor to protect and avenge the innocent, as well as protect women and children no matter the circumstances. On many occasions, his reputation by itself has proven enough to deter potential foes. Knowing that the infamous Jonah Hex is pursuing them often unnerves Hex's targets so badly that they make fatal mistakes, such as wasting ammunition, falling into traps, or turning and engaging Hex in a desperate stand-off that enables him to finish them easily.

In Superman/Batman #16 when the timeline of the DC Universe was changed by the Legion of Super-Villains, Batman and Superman ended up being catapulted to multiple alternate timelines to restore everything back in its original order. In one timeline, they end up in a modern-day Gotham City in which Western-themed superheroes act as law enforcement officers. While Superman was attending to a badly wounded Batman, Jonah Hex tracked them down and managed to kill the Man of Steel using Kryptonite bullets. Although Superman was not really killed, it was heavily implied that this was done primarily because in that story arc, the only way for Superman and Batman to be transported to another timeline is for them to die.

Jonah Hex has, in many timelines, met and fought Batman. In Superman/Batman #16, Hex overpowered Batman in hand-to-hand combat (albeit Batman had been heavily wounded and thus couldn't fight back with his usual ability). In Batman: The Return of Bruce Wayne, Hex and Batman face off in a showdown. Even though he has experience in disarming gunmen with his batarangs, Batman was still outdrawn by Hex, and Hex shoots him in the stomach. However, Batman at the time was suffering from amnesia and lacked most of his skills, including his hand-to-eye coordination.

== Supporting cast ==
As he was not a traditional superhero, Jonah Hex never amassed a "rogues' gallery" comparable to that of other costumed comic-book heroes such as Batman or the Flash, though he had a few adversaries who returned from time to time. The first and most notable of these to date was Quentin Turnbull, who was initially known only as the "man with the eagle-topped cane". Turnbull was the father of Hex's oldest friend, Jeb Turnbull. During the American Civil War, Jonah, then a Confederate cavalryman, surrendered himself to the Union forces after the passage of the Emancipation Proclamation, but he refused to betray where his fellow-Confederates were camped. A Union soldier was able to determine the location of their camp anyway by examining the dirt in the hooves of Jonah's horse. Jonah's comrades were all captured and then later massacred during the "Fort Charlotte Massacre", including Jeb. Believing the false rumors that Jonah had helped plan the massacre, Turnbull swore to avenge his son.

One such scheme involved Turnbull hiring an unnamed stage actor to impersonate Hex to try and frame him as a murderous outlaw. This actor, naming himself "The Chameleon", was eventually hideously scarred in a fire started by Hex, and he also swore revenge on the bounty-hunter.

El Papagayo was a Mexican bandit running guns. Hex was hired by the United States Secret Service (actually a man hired by Turnbull to pose as a Secret Service agent) to infiltrate El Papagayo's band and bring him to justice. Hex was unsuccessful, and he and Papagayo met several more times over the years until Hex finally stabbed him dead in a confrontation.

Jonah Hex also had a number of allies and supporting characters during many of his adventures, but most wound up getting killed in the course of helping him. An exception is Tallulah Black, a character introduced in 2007. As a young woman, Tallulah was savagely raped and mutilated by the men who murdered her family. She was saved by Hex, who helped her gain vengeance. She would go on to become a bounty-huntress herself and eventually Hex's lover. Tallulah eventually became pregnant by Hex, but their child, a girl, was killed before being born. (Jonah Hex vol. 2, #50).

Joshua Dazzleby is Jonah's half-brother and is introduced in the graphic novel Jonah Hex: No Way Back (2010) as a preacher and elected sheriff of a moralistic town that bans saloons and prostitution. Dazzleby is the opposite of Hex: he was raised properly, and as such, is respected and has risen to a position of leadership among his peers. He welcomes his half-brother when the latter tracks him down, but Hex ultimately chooses to leave when he realizes that he doesn't belong. Nevertheless, the two brothers part on amicable terms.

== Appearances ==
=== Core series ===
Hex #1, 1985

The following are publications in which Jonah Hex is the central character.

- All-Star Western (Vol. 2 #10–11; 1972)
- Weird Western Tales (#12–14, #16–38; 1972–1977)
- Jonah Hex (Vol. 1 #1–92; 1977–1985)
- DC Special Series #16 (1978/Fall)
- Hex (#1–18; 1985–1987)
- Secret Origins (Vol. 2 #21; 1987/12)
- Jonah Hex: Two Gun Mojo (#1–5; 1993)
- Jonah Hex: Riders of the Worm and Such (#1–5; 1995)
- Jonah Hex: Shadows West (#1–3; 1999)
- Jonah Hex (Vol. 2 #1–70; 2005–2011)
- Jonah Hex: No Way Back (June 2010)
- All-Star Western (Vol. 3 #1–34; 2011–2014)

=== Other appearances ===
- Batman (#237; 1971/12): Jonah shown in an advertisement for All-Star Western comic (1st published appearance – contains 2 comic strip panels that pre-date All-Star Western #10) (full-page version of this ad in various DC war comics of the same month)
- Justice League of America (#159, 160, 198, 199; 1978–1982)
- Super Star Holiday Special: DC Special Series (Vol. 4 #21; 1980/Spring)
- Comic Reader (#194; 1981/09)
- Crisis on Infinite Earths (#3–5; 1985/06)
- Green Lantern (Vol. 2 #195–196; 1985)
- DC Challenge (#2–3, #11; 1985–1986)
- Swamp Thing (#46; 1986/03)
- Legion Of Super-Heroes (#23; 1986/06)
- Swamp Thing (#85; 1989/04)
- Time Masters (#2–3; 1990)
- Justice League Europe Annual (#2; 1991/01)
- Books of Magic (#4; 1991/02)
- Armageddon: Alien Agenda (#3; 1992–01)
- Zero Hour (#0; 1994/09)
- Kingdom Come (#4; 1997)
- Unlimited Access (#1; 1997)
- Superboy (#54–55, #71–75; 1998–2000)

In 1998, a female character named Hex was introduced in the pages of Superboy. She first appears as a temperamental supermodel until an agent of the Agenda slices the right side of her face, at which point she started claiming to be Jonah Hex. She adopts his voice and manner of speaking, and displays his sharpshooting skills with a pistol. She has the ability to shoot "psionic bullets" from any kind of gun when in her "Jonah Hex" mode; otherwise she was powerless. It was hinted that the Agenda had either performed experiments on her or that she had been created by them; but nothing has been confirmed. She was last seen flying out of Project Cadmus riding atop Grokk, the Living Gargoyle.

- Guns of the Dragon (#3; 1998/12)
- The Kingdom (#2; 1998)
- The Kents (#8, #10; 1998)
- Wild Times: Deathblow (1999/08)
- World's Funnest (2000)
- Hawkman (#7; 2002/11)
- Superman & Batman: Generations (Vol. 3 #8; 2003/10)
- The Legion (#29; 2004/03)
- Another Nail (#3; 2004/8)
- Superman/Batman (#16; 2004/12)
- Deadshot (#4; 2005/03)
- Superman/Batman (#18; 2005/02)
- Infinite Crisis (#6; 2006/04)
- Justice League Unlimited (#19; 2006/005)
- Uncle Sam and the Freedom Fighters (#3; 2006/11)

Jonah Hex makes a cameo appearance, escorting the Navajo back to the Canyon DeChelly, after the Long Walk of the Navajo was over. It appears that Jonah is escorting the Navajo on to the Long Walk, but this was an artist error, as indicated by the author on his Forum

- Booster Gold (#2; 2007/11): Minor cameo at end of book
- Booster Gold (#3; 2007/12)
- Weird Western Tales (#71; 2010/01): In the Weird Western Tales tie-in to the Blackest Night crossover, Jonah Hex was reanimated as a member of the Black Lanterns. Searching for a stolen Black Lantern Ring, he finds that the holder of such a prize is none other than the descendant of his old nemesis Quentin Turnbull. Alongside the resurrected Turnbull himself and a horde of angry Black Lanterns, he engages in a firefight against the younger Turnbull (who attempts to convince the elder to join forces with him to restore their power) until he is left between Hex and Quentin, at which point the elder Turnbull kills the younger.
- Batman: The Return of Bruce Wayne (#3; 2010): Hex appears at the end of the story as a lead-in to the next issue.
- Batman: The Return of Bruce Wayne (#4; 2010): Hex is hired to take down a mysterious stranger in 1800s Gotham.
- The All-New Batman: The Brave and the Bold (#11; 2011): Batman goes back in time to 1879 Gotham to stop an earthquake machine designed by Ra's al Ghul. He teams up with Jonah who is trying to collect a bounty on Ubu.

=== Collected editions ===
Various trade paperback collections are being released, both of the ongoing second series and Jonah Hex' original appearances:

- Shadows West (written by Joe R. Lansdale; art by Timothy Truman and Sam Glanzman; collects the miniseries Jonah Hex: Two Gun Mojo #1–5, Jonah Hex: Shadows West #1–3, and Jonah Hex: Riders of the Worm and Such #1–5)
- Showcase Presents: Jonah Hex:
  - Volume 1 (written by John Albano and Michael Fleisher; art by Tony DeZuniga, Doug Wildey, José Luís Garcia-López and others; 526 pages, collects All-Star Western #2–8 and #10–11, Weird Western Tales #12–14 and #16–33, November 2005, ISBN 1-4012-0760-X)
  - Volume 2 (written Michael Fleisher; art by José Luís Garcia-López and others; 528 pages, collects Weird Western Tales #34–38 and Jonah Hex (vol. 1) #1–22, March 2014, ISBN 978-1-4012-4106-3)
- Jonah Hex: Welcome to Paradise (written by John Albano and Michael Fleisher; art by Tony DeZuniga, Dough Wildey, Noly Panaligan, George Moliterni, and Jose Louis Garcia-Lopez; 168 pages, collects All-Star Western #10; Weird Western Tales #14, 17, 22, 26, 29, 30; Jonah Hex #2 and 4, May 2010, ISBN 1-4012-2757-0)
- Jonah Hex (vol. 2):
  - Face Full of Violence (written by Justin Gray and Jimmy Palmiotti; art by Luke Ross, and Tony DeZuniga; 144 pages, collects Jonah Hex #1–6, Titan Books, December 2006, ISBN 1-84576-408-0, DC, September 2006, ISBN 1-4012-1095-3)
  - Guns of Vengeance (written by Justin Gray and Jimmy Palmiotti; art by Luke Ross, Dylan Teague, Tony Dezuñiga, Phil Noto, David Michael Beck, Paul Gulacy, Jimmy Palmiotti, Giuseppe Camuncoli, and Art Thibert; 144 pages, collects Jonah Hex #7–12, DC, April 2007, ISBN 1-4012-1249-2)
  - Origins (written by Justin Gray and Jimmy Palmiotti; art by Jordi Bernet, Phil Noto, and Val Semeik; 144 pages, collects Jonah Hex #13–18, DC, November 2007, ISBN 1-4012-1490-8)
  - Only the Good Die Young (written by Justin Gray and Jimmy Palmiotti; art by Jordi Bernet, Phil Noto, and David Michael Beck; 144 pages, collects Jonah Hex #19–24, DC, April 2008, ISBN 1-4012-1689-7)
  - Luck Runs Out (written by Justin Gray and Jimmy Palmiotti; art by Russ Heath, Giuseppe Camuncoli, Jordi Bernet, John Higgins, Stefano Landini, and Rafa Garres; 144 pages, collects Jonah Hex #25–30, DC, October 2008, ISBN 978-1-4012-1960-4)
  - Bullets Don't Lie (written by Justin Gray and Jimmy Palmiotti; art by Darwyn Cooke, J.H. Williams III, Jordi Bernet, Rafa Garres, Paulo Siqueira, and Mark Sparacio; 144 pages, collects Jonah Hex #31–36, DC, April 2009, ISBN 978-1-4012-2157-7)
  - Lead Poisoning (written by Justin Gray and Jimmy Palmiotti; art by Jordi Bernet, and David Michael Beck; 144 pages, collects Jonah Hex #37–42, DC, October 2009, ISBN 978-1-4012-2485-1)
  - The Six Gun War (written by Justin Gray and Jimmy Palmiotti; art by Cristiano Cucina; 144 pages, collects Jonah Hex #44–49, DC, April 2010, ISBN 978-1-4012-2587-2)
  - Counting Corpses (written by Justin Gray and Jimmy Palmiotti; art by Darwyn Cooke, Dick Giordano, Jordi Bernet, Paul Gulacy, and Billy Tucci; 160 pages, collects Jonah Hex #43, 50–54, DC, October 2010, ISBN 978-1-4012-2899-6)
  - Tall Tales (written by Justin Gray and Jimmy Palmiotti; art by Vicente Alcazar, Phil Winslade, Jordi Bernet, Giancarlo Caracuzzo, and Brian Stelfreeze; 144 pages; collects Jonah Hex #55–60, DC, April 2011, ISBN 1-4012-3009-1)
  - Bury Me in Hell (written by Justin Gray and Jimmy Palmiotti; art by Jordi Bernet and Eduardo Risso; 224 pages; collects Jonah Hex #61–70, DC, December 2011, ISBN 978-0-85768-863-7)
- Jonah Hex: No Way Back (original graphic novel), (June 14, 2011, ISBN 9781401225506)

== In other media ==
=== Television ===
==== Live-action ====
- In 2000, 20th Century Fox developed a one-hour adaptation based on the character Jonah Hex to television with producers Akiva Goldsman and Robert Zappia involved, but the project never made it into production.
- Jonah Hex appears in media set in the Arrowverse, portrayed by Johnathon Schaech:
  - Hex makes a cameo appearance in the TV series The Flash episode "Welcome to Earth-2".
  - Hex appears in the TV series Legends of Tomorrow. This version is an old friend of Rip Hunter and an occasional ally of the titular Legends.
  - An alternate universe incarnation of Hex from Earth-18 makes a cameo appearance in the crossover "Crisis on Infinite Earths" as the guardian of a Lazarus Pit in a North Dakota mine.

==== Animation ====
Jonah Hex as depicted in Batman: The Animated Series

- Jonah Hex appears in series set in the DC Animated Universe (DCAU).
  - Hex first appears in the Batman: The Animated Series episode "Showdown", voiced by Bill McKinney. This version previously encountered Ra's al Ghul and the latter's son Arkady Duvall in the late 19th century while foiling their attempt to mount a terrorist attack via an airship. Though Ra's escaped, Hex left Duvall for American soldiers.
  - Hex appears in the Justice League Unlimited episode "The Once and Future Thing, Part One: Weird Western Tales", voiced by Adam Baldwin. He joins forces with El Diablo, Bat Lash and Sheriff Ohiyesa Smith, as well as Batman, Wonder Woman and John Stewart to defeat Tobias Manning after the outlaw steals Chronos's future technology.
- Jonah Hex appears in Batman: The Brave and the Bold, voiced by Phil Morris. This version was previously rescued by Mongul during a mission and transported to the present day, subsequently serving him in exchange for a chance to return to his own time. After Mongul's time-tunnel is destroyed, Hex chooses to remain on War World.
- Jonah Hex appears in the Justice League Action episode "All Aboard the Space Train", voiced by Trevor Devall. This version was frozen in ice in the Rocky Mountains until the Justice League recover him in the present. After helping the League and Space Cabbie defeat Kanjar Ro, Hex chooses to stay on a desert planet with a horse-like alien.
- Jonah Hex makes multiple non-speaking cameos in Teen Titans Go!, before making a full appearance in the episode, "A Sticky Situation", voiced by Scott Menville.

=== Film ===
- The film Blind Justice is reportedly and partially inspired by Jonah Hex.
- Jonah Hex appears in a self-titled film, portrayed by Josh Brolin.
- Jonah Hex appears in DC Showcase: Jonah Hex, voiced by Thomas Jane.
- Jonah Hex makes a non-speaking cameo appearance in Teen Titans Go! To the Movies.
- An illusionary Jonah Hex appears in Justice League: Warworld, voiced by Troy Baker.

=== Video games ===
Jonah Hex appears as a character summon in Scribblenauts Unmasked: A DC Comics Adventure.

=== Miscellaneous ===
- Jonah Hex appears in a motion comic, voiced by Jim Cummings.
- Jonah Hex appears in the novel DC Universe: Trail of Time, written by Jeff Mariotte and published by Warner Books in 2007.

=== Music ===
- In 2006, "The Ballad of Jonah Hex" was written by American multi-instrumentalist musician and singer-songwriter Ian Frazier and later recorded at Elevator Studios in Long Beach, California. According to Frazier, the inspiration for the song came from reading Jimmy Palmiotti and Justin Gray's take on the character in Jonah Hex vol. 2 and his own love for Sergio Leone's Man With No Name films. The song, which features Frazier on acoustic guitar and vocals, is in narrative form and contains a verse that relates Hex's origin story as told by Palmiotti and Gray in their three-part "Retribution" storyline that ran from issues #13–15. Ian Frazier and Long Beach musician Robert Conrad performed the song live for Palmiotti at the inaugural Long Beach Comic Con in 2009. Due to copyright concerns, Frazier removed the song from iTunes in 2011.
- Ghoultown's album Tales from the Dead West features a song called "Death of Jonah Hex".
- Jonah Hex's alien abduction in Crisis on Infinite Earths #3 is adapted into "Westerner", a nine-minute song by French-Canadian electro-rock band Judge Rock.
- Jonah Hex is featured in the song "By the Gun", which is part of Nerdcore artist Dr. Awkward's EP New 52.

== Lawsuit ==
Cover to Jonah Hex: Riders of the Worm and Such #4, featuring the Autumn Brothers. Art by Timothy Truman

In 1996, musicians Johnny and Edgar Winter filed suit against DC and the creators of the Jonah Hex: Riders of the Worm and Such limited series, claiming, amongst other things, defamation: two characters named the Autumn Brothers in the series strongly resemble the Winters. Writer Joe Lansdale said on the Comic Book Legal Defense Fund site:

It was our intent to use the Jonah Hex comic book series as a vehicle for satire and parody of musical genres, Texas music in particular, as well as old radio shows, movie serials and the like. We feel within our rights to parody music, stage personas, album personas, lyrics, and public figures.

The judge agreed and ruled in favor of the defendants, saying parody was covered by the First Amendment. The briefs were refiled in June 2002 through the National Organization for Albinism and Hypopigmentation and while the decision was upheld, the comic was deemed not to be "transformative" raising possible future problems for parody. In 2003, the Supreme Court of California sided with DC.

== Reception ==
IGN ranked Jonah Hex as the 73rd Greatest Comic Book Hero of All Time, stating that "his distinctive appearance and engrossing adventures set Hex apart from the rest of the cowboy crowd".

== See also ==
- Jonah Hex: No Way Back
- Bat Lash
- Loveless
- High Moon
- Weird West
