= Weird Western Tales =

Western genre comics anthology published by DC Comics

- Cover of Weird Western Tales #12 (June - July 1972), the first issue of the series under that title; art by Joe Kubert.

Publication information
- Publisher: DC Comics
- Schedule: Bimonthly/Monthly
- Format: Ongoing series
- Publication date: List: (vol. 1) June–July 1972 – August 1980 (vol. 2) April 2001–July 2001
- No. of issues: List: Vol. 1: 59 Vol. 2: 4
- Main character(s): Jonah Hex; Scalphunter; Cinnamon

Creative team
- Written by: List: John Albano Cary Bates Michael Fleisher Gerry Conway Roger McKenzie
- Penciller: List: Tony DeZuniga Neal Adams Gil Kane Bill Draut Alfredo Alcala José Luis García-López Howard Chaykin Dick Ayers
- Inker: List: Frank Springer George Evans Danny Bulanadi Luis Dominguez Romeo Tanghal

Weird Western Tales is a Western genre comics anthology published by DC Comics from June–July 1972 to August 1980. It is best known for featuring the adventures of Jonah Hex until #38 (Jan.–Feb. 1977) when the character was promoted to his own eponymous series. Scalphunter then became the featured character in Weird Western Tales.

== Publication history ==
=== Original series ===
The original title ran for eight years and 59 issues. It started with issue #12 (June–July 1972), continuing the numbering from the second volume of All-Star Western two issues after the first appearance of Jonah Hex. The title's name was partially inspired by the sales success of Weird War Tales, and signaled the loosening standards of the outdated Comics Code Authority.

When Jonah Hex received his own eponymous series, he was replaced as the lead feature of Weird Western Tales by Scalphunter as of issue #39 (March–April 1977). The character Cinnamon was introduced in issue #48 (Sept.–Oct. 1978) by writer Roger McKenzie and artist Jack Abel. The final issue was #70 (August 1980).

=== Revival ===
Weird Western Tales was revived in 2001 as a four-issue limited series. This series had no relation to the earlier title, instead featuring a series of one-shot Western-based stories.

=== Blackest Night ===
A one-shot revival of the series utilizing the original numbering #71 (March 2010) was published as a tie-in to the Blackest Night limited series.

== Collected editions ==
- Showcase Presents: Jonah Hex
  - Volume 1 includes Weird Western Tales #12–14 and 16–33, 528 pages, November 2005, ISBN 1-4012-0760-X
  - Volume 2 includes Weird Western Tales #34–38, 544 pages, March 2014, ISBN 978-1401241063

== See also ==
- High Moon
- Weird West, the cross-genre
