= Jonah Hex: No Way Back =

2010 graphic novel

- Hardcover edition cover.
- Date: June 2010
- Main characters: Jonah Hex
- Page count: 136 pages
- Publisher: DC Comics

Creative team
- Writers: Justin Gray; Jimmy Palmiotti
- Artists: Tony DeZuniga
- ISBN: 978-1401225506

Jonah Hex: No Way Back is a 2010 original graphic novel written by Jimmy Palmiotti and Justin Gray with art by Tony DeZuniga, published by DC Comics, and starring the Western bounty hunter Jonah Hex.

== Publication history ==
Jonah Hex: No Way Back was released to coincide with the film version of Jonah Hex released June 18, 2010.

In an interview with DC Comics' The Source blog, Justin Gray said:

Jonah Hex has a brother. That's the idea that came up decades earlier in discussions between writer John Albano and Tony DeZuniga. Tony casually mentioned this to us and that idea has been brought to life in the hardcover. Bold, brazen violent and surprisingly tender, this is the consummate tale of the Wild West's greatest bounty hunter.

Jimmy Palmiotti said:

This is the first all original Jonah Hex graphic novel and a dream project for us. Jonah is one of the coolest and most unique characters we have ever had the pleasure to work on. He's an icon for all ages and his untamed manner appeals, on a visceral gut level, to just about everyone who reads it. In this, Hex's first original graphic novel, we unleash the beast like you have never seen before.

== Plot summary ==
After collecting a bounty, Jonah Hex takes up in a saloon for the night while acquiring the services of prostitutes. Two lawmen arrive and give a prostitute a wanted poster to deliver to Hex showing that his mother, Virginia "Ginny" Dazzleby, is wanted for murder. In a flashback, it's revealed that Hex has not seen his mother since childhood when she ran off and left Hex with his abusive father.

Two days later, Hex's horse is shot out from under him by two bandits. He plays dead before shooting them both, and takes their dog, which he names Dag, as a companion. Hex arrives at another saloon to inquire about his mother. The bartender directs Hex to a camp located behind the town, where Hex encounters three men gathering tainted blankets to trade to Indians who settled on land they purchased. When the men try to rob Hex, he shoots one in the arm and maneuvers the other two into shooting each other. A small boy who overheard Hex questioning the men about his mother steps forward to say she was kidnapped by a group of Mexicans heading south.

While on their trail in Arizona, Hex comes across a Navajo village razed by the Mexicans so they could pass off the Navajo scalps as Apache and sell them. Hex catches up with the Mexicans and kills them in a gunfight. He finds his mother upstairs dying of tuberculosis; believing him to be the devil, she confesses that the Mexicans that captured her were working for the outlaw El Papagayo and that she has a son named Joshua Dazzleby. A server at the bar, Edna, reveals to Hex that his mother was taken as bait for him.

Hex travels to Heaven's Gate in Colorado to deliver his mother's corpse to his half-brother and learns that Joshua is both a preacher and the town sheriff and has banned drinking and prostitution. Hex prepares to leave, but Joshua convinces him to stay for Virginia's funeral on the condition that he surrenders his guns. Meanwhile, El Papagayo shows up at the saloon where Hex killed his men. He ties up and severely beats the bartender, his daughter, and Edna, and shoots Edna dead after she bites his hand. He then reveals that Hex's father destroyed his village when he was a child and he swore revenge on Hex's family.

Back in Heaven's Gate, Joshua tries to make peace with his half-brother, but Hex makes good on his promise to ride out after the funeral. However, shortly after leaving town, Hex spots El Papagayo with around fifty men riding towards the town. Hex returns and urges the townspeople to run, but they decide to stay and fight instead. When El Papagayo and his men arrive, they find Dag and shoot him for fun.

Jonah Hex kills El Papagayo.

A dying Dag leads the gang to the hot springs outside Heaven's Gate, where they find women bathing. The bandits jump in, only to find armed men hidden under the water. The townspeople win the initial skirmish, but Papagayo then guns several of them down with a Gatling gun and promises to spare the rest if they turn over Hex. The men overpower Hex and attempt to hand him over, but when Papagayo hears Joshua refer to Hex as his brother, he impulsively shoots him. Hex breaks free, and Papagayo shoots him in the shoulder before Hex knocks the gun out of his hand. Papagayo reveals a hidden knife and stabs Hex through the arm. The fight continues until Hex pins Papagayo and slits his throat with the knife still in his arm. Seeing their leader dead, El Papgayo's remaining men retreat.

The story cuts to months later when Hex leaves Heaven's Gate after staying with his brother to heal. On his way out, Hex stops by his mother's grave, with Dag buried next to her, and tells her he doesn't blame her for leaving.

== Reception ==
Reception for the graphic novel has been positive.

Ain't It Cool News Comics wrote, "If Jonah Hex: No Way Back were made page for page into a motion picture it would be the best Western movie in years. Gray and Palmiotti have taken an anti-hero they've grown accustomed to and elaborated their usual one-off, single issue stories into a full scale graphic novel and it's about as perfect as it gets when it comes to what anyone would want in a Western story".

CraveOnline wrote "No Way Back stays true to the character and is a superb addition to his long history in the DCU. It's not so much an origin tale; instead it's a nice layer of depth to Jonah's past that ultimately makes the reader more sympathetic to the character. I wouldn't go so far as to say that this added element was absolutely necessary, but it's certainly not unwelcome. Too often with antiheroes like Jonah Hex, writers focus too much on badass one-liners and brutal kills without ever exploring the character's inner workings fully. Thankfully, that's exactly what regular Hex writers Justin Gray and Jimmy Palmiotti do in No Way Back".
