= Cinnamon (character) =

- Cover to Cinnamon: El Ciclo #1 (October 2003), art by Howard Chaykin.

Publication information
- Publisher: DC Comics
- First appearance: Weird Western Tales #48 (September–October 1978)
- Created by: Roger McKenzie (script); Jack Abel (pencils); Danny Bulanadi (inks)

In-story information
- Full name: Katherine "Kate" Manser
- Team affiliations: Rough Bunch; Checkmate; Justice Riders
- Partnerships: Nighthawk
- Abilities: Excellent marksman

Cinnamon is the name of two Western characters in DC Comics, one inhabiting the wild west, the other living in the modern era. The character first appeared in Weird Western Tales #48 (September–October 1978), in a script written by Roger McKenzie, with artwork by Jack Abel (pencils) and Danny Bulanadi (inks).

== Fictional character biography ==
The first Cinnamon is Katherine "Kate" Manser, the daughter of a sheriff in a small Western town. After her father is killed by bank robbers, she is sent to an orphanage where she secretly trains herself in gunfighting. Upon leaving the orphanage, she becomes a bounty hunter to search for her father's killers.

In the third series of Hawkman, it is revealed that Cinnamon is a reincarnation of the Egyptian princess Chay-Ara. As such, she becomes the lover of Prince Khufu's reincarnation, the hero Nighthawk. When Gentleman Ghost attacks Cinnamon, Nighthawk lynches him, wrongly believing he had sexually assaulted her and thereby tying his destiny to theirs. Cinnamon, along with Nighthawk, is killed by Matilda Dunney Roderic, presumably the most recent incarnation of their eternal enemy Hath-Set.

A billboard in Wonder Woman #175 (which featured as many of DC's heroines as possible) advertises a musical entitled Cinnamon Get Your Gun, parodying Annie Get Your Gun.

The Silver-Age Cinnamon appeared in Weird Western Tales #48-49, and Justice League of America #198-199.

=== Modern Cinnamon ===
A modern-day version of the character is introduced in the miniseries Cinnamon: El Ciclo (2003), named by her parents after the historical gunslinger Cinnamon. Like the original, her father is a sheriff who is shot by bank robbers, leading her to seek revenge on the killers and become a bounty hunter.

She is seen in the Infinite Crisis special Villains United as one of several heroes recruited to fight various supervillain prison escapes. In Checkmate #24, she is revealed to be a member of the eponymous organization.

=== The New 52 ===
Cinnamon appears in All-Star Western in both its backups and in the main Jonah Hex story. This version wears an Indian medallion which grants her enhanced strength and healing abilities.

== In other media ==
- Cinnamon makes a non-speaking cameo appearance in the teaser for the Batman: The Brave and the Bold episode "The Siege of Starro!". This version is an associate of Jonah Hex and an enemy of the Royal Flush Gang.
- Cinnamon appears in the Legends of Tomorrow episode "The Magnificent Eight", portrayed by Anna Deavere Smith. This version is from Salvation, Dakota Territory, in 1871 and previously lost her partner Hannibal Hawkes.
- An young, illusionary version of Cinnamon appears in Justice League: Warworld, voiced by an uncredited Kari Wahlgren.
- Cinnamon appears as a character summon in Scribblenauts Unmasked: A DC Comics Adventure.
