= Whiteout (comics) =

Whiteout, in comics, may refer to:

- Whiteout, a Marvel Comics character from the Savage Land Mutates
- Whiteout (Oni Press), a series from Oni Press, written by Greg Rucka and adapted into a film released in 2009
  - Whiteout: Melt, a sequel also by Greg Rucka
- Whyteout, a Marvel Comics character who appeared in Thunderstrike

== See also ==
- Whiteout (disambiguation)
