= Martha Washington (comics) =

Fictional character created by Frank Miller and Dave Gibbons

- Martha Washington on the cover to Give Me Liberty #1. Art by Dave Gibbons.

Publication information
- Publisher: Dark Horse Comics
- First appearance: Give Me Liberty #1, 1990
- Created by: Frank Miller and Dave Gibbons

In-story information
- Alter ego: Martha Washington
- Abilities: Computer programming, hacking, hand-to-hand combat

Martha Washington is a fictional character created by Frank Miller and Dave Gibbons, first appearing in the four-issue comic book series Give Me Liberty, published in 1990 by Dark Horse Comics.

== Fictional character biography ==
Born on March 11, 1995, and died on March 11, 2095, Martha Washington grew up in the Cabrini–Green housing project in Chicago (called "The Green") with her mother and two brothers in abject poverty brought on by the economic policies of the President Erwin Rexall. She is an average student, but one who displays a gift for computer programming and hacking.

Her teacher, Donald, encourages her to be a better student and, because he lives outside the Green, brings her contraband items. One night, Martha shows up at Donald's classroom and finds that he has been murdered by the Ice Man, a large thug who works for a local gangster called the Pope. Before dying, Donald managed to stab the Ice Man in the wrist. This distraction allowed Martha to seize his weapon, a longshoreman's hook, and plunge it into his shoulder. The Ice Man chases her through the school to a locker room, but before he can kill her, he dies of blood loss. Martha is later remanded to a psychiatric hospital.

In the institution, she discovers that experiments are being secretly performed on children to genetically alter their minds, effectively turning them into human computers. Their heads are covered with wires plugged into their brains. Martha believes one of them resembles the Raggedy Ann doll she played with as a child. This institution is closed due to national budget cuts, and Martha is left homeless. She later joins the PAX Peace Force, where her heroic tale begins. She fights in many battles during the second American Civil War.

During the second American Civil War, her mother and brother die when Chicago is destroyed by a nuclear weapon.

== Appearances ==
=== Give Me Liberty ===
Martha Washington's first appearance, a four-issue mini-series published in 1990, features her joining the PAX Peace Force — a reinvented U.S. Army — and engaging in various heroic efforts, such as saving the rain forests of South America from crazed cattle ranchers. She eventually has to thwart the megalomanical plans of Colonel Moretti before he brings the country to the brink of destruction.

=== Martha Washington Goes to War ===
A five-issue series published in 1994, and closely based on Ayn Rand's Atlas Shrugged, Martha Washington Goes to War has Martha fighting for the PAX army to reunite the fractured United States. The war effort is undermined by frequent technology failures, the disappearances of America's brightest minds, and a general malaise among the people. Washington is crippled in an attack. She is secretly visited by Wasserstein, her old boyfriend, who heals her with unknown technology. Washington is later brought onboard PAX's orbiting satellite Harmony. Wasserstein returns and seems to kill Coogan, Harmony's chief engineer. Washington pursues Wasserstein's flying craft into the radioactive wasteland in Oklahoma. She penetrates the field at the core of the wasteland, and finds a paradise. Wasserstein, Raggyann, and the missing scientists have hidden themselves here to develop technologies and strategies to improve the world. They knew PAX and the current government were not interested in truly improving people's lives, so they created this sanctuary to wait until they were strong enough to overthrow the corrupt government and implement true change.

Meanwhile, the Surgeon General, living through robot doubles, has taken control of Harmony. He finds the sanctuary by tracking Washington's wrist computer and fires a devastating ray. As she sees the destruction she indirectly caused, Washington realizes it was this weapon that destroyed Oklahoma and not a nuclear device. Washington joins the scientists' cause as they attack and bring down Harmony. The Surgeon General's robots are destroyed. Other revolutionaries infiltrate military bases, free political prisoners, and seize control of the US government. Two years later, Washington continues to work with the revolutionaries to create a better world.

=== Happy Birthday, Martha Washington ===
A one-shot issue published in 1995, this is a collection of short stories about Martha and some of the many battles she has fought.

The first story Collateral Damage, has Martha landing in Manhattan to take out Dictator Beluga. The building she lands in is shelled by PAX (her own side) and she is forced to head to Mercy Hospital with a wounded soldier of the Manhattan military. After the man she saved is patched up, they sit down to share a cigarette. He reveals to her that Dictator Beluga is dead, assassinated by his inner circle and possibly even by his wife. However, PAX does not believe Martha's report and the shelling continues.

The second story, State of the Art, has Martha confronting another soldier named Elaine from a divided American state. They fight each other off, and when they prove to be evenly matched, especially when they run out of bullets from their pistols, they laugh it off and instead form a truce to chat while waiting for the cavalry from both sides.

The third and final story,Insubordination, which is dedicated to Jack Kirby, opens with Martha receiving another assignment to be part of a PAX unit to retrieve a blood sample from a Captain America-like superhero named Captain Kurtz.

Kurtz had invented a formula for himself that made him super strong and gave him a degree of immortality. However, he is now about to die as he is slowly losing the effects of the serum, and the last batch was destroyed by a nuclear accident in Omaha. They ordered Martha's unit to obtain a blood sample from Kurtz so they could create more super-soldiers.

The unit landed in Pennsylvania, which is infested with neo-Nazi skinheads. The skinheads wiped out the unit except for Martha, who barely survived. She continued her mission and spotted Captain Kurtz, who was protecting the Liberty Bell from the skinheads.

Kurtz was aware that Martha had come to take his blood. Martha felt uncomfortable about performing the deed. The Captain knew Martha had courage within her and that she would one day disobey her orders to do what was right, just as he was now protecting the Liberty Bell from the Nazi skinheads who wanted to destroy it.

After Martha took the blood from Captain Kurtz, he showed her an escape path through the tunnels while he faced his last stand against the remaining neo-Nazis. As Martha made her escape, she paused for a moment while holding the vial of Kurtz's blood, thinking that only Kurtz was able to control the serum's effects, while others could not handle it. Following Kurtz's advice to disobey orders for the greater good, Martha broke the vial and continued her escape.

=== Martha Washington Stranded in Space ===
A one-shot issue published in 1995, Martha Washington Stranded in Space guest-stars The Big Guy. Martha investigates a space anomaly which temporarily sends her to Big Guy's reality. The back-up story is "Attack of the Flesh Eating Monsters", originally published in black and white in Dark Horse Presents #100-4. Martha fights off an attack by monsters conforming to 1950s pulp-SF stereotypes; she discovers that this is merely a psychological study conducted by the world-controlling AI, named Venus.

=== Martha Washington Saves the World ===
A three-issue series published in 1997, Martha Washington Saves the World depicts the arrival of an actual alien spaceship. Martha uses its superior technology to defeat the megalomaniacal artificial intelligence named Venus, which - though it had proved critical in defeating the old corrupt American regime - has been undermining humanity and sapping people's will. Martha and a handful of friends then leave Earth entirely, off to explore the origin of the aliens.

=== Martha Washington Dies ===
This 2007 one-shot takes place on Martha Washington's 100th birthday on March 11, 2095, in a warzone. Unlike the earlier stories narrated by Martha, it is narrated by a young female soldier who looks like Martha Washington before joining Pax in the first issue of Give Me Liberty. She reveals that Martha married Wasserstein and had three sons, of whom she survived, and also that it is her final day of Martha's life. Surrounded by soldiers apparently under siege from unknown foes, who are described as "barbarians who won an awful victory", Martha gives a brief speech of inspiration and as she dies, she gave her final words to the soldiers for courage "Give me liberty" before turning her body into a blast full of fireworks. The final page of the series ends with the Martha lookalike now leading the soldiers to battle, who were encouraged by Martha's final words.

== Collected editions ==
Dark Horse released a hardcover collection of all the stories, remastered with added extras, in October 2009. It was initially announced as The Life and Times of Martha Washington in the Twenty First Century, and then The Martha Washington Omnibus, before finally settling on the original name.

The details of the various collections:

- The Life and Times of Martha Washington in the Twenty-First Century (Dark Horse Comics, hardcover, 600 pages, July 2009, ISBN 1-59307-654-1) collects:
  - Give Me Liberty (4-issue mini-series, June–September 1990, tpb, Dell, ISBN 0-440-50446-5)
  - Martha Washington Goes to War (5-issue mini-series, 1994, tpb, ISBN 1-56971-090-2)
  - "Happy Birthday, Martha Washington" (one-shot, 1995)
  - "Martha Washington Stranded in Space" (one-shot, 1995)
  - Martha Washington Saves the World (3-issue mini-series, 1997, tpb, ISBN 1-56971-384-7)
  - Martha Washington Dies (one-shot, 2007)

A numbered, limited-edition version of the collection includes "tip-in pencil art" signed by both creators ISBN 1-59582-309-3).
