= John Albano =

American comics writer (1922–2005)

- Burial place: Long Island National Cemetery
- Military career
- Allegiance: United States
- Branch: Army
- Service years: 1943-1946
- Rank: Technician third grade
- Conflicts: Battle of the Bulge
- Awards: American Service Medal, Asiatic Pacific Service Medal, European-African-Middle Eastern Service Medal, WW2 Victory Medal

John Albano
- Born: September 12, 1922 U.S.
- Died: May 23, 2005 (aged 82) Orlando, Florida, U.S.
- Area: Writer
- Notable works: Jonah Hex
- Awards: Shazam Award, Best Writer (Humor Division), 1971; Shazam Award, Best Individual Short Story (Dramatic), 1972

John F. Albano (September 12, 1922 – May 23, 2005) was an American writer and WW2 veteran who worked in the comic book industry. He was recognized for his work with the Shazam Award for Best Writer (Humor Division) in 1971, and the Shazam Award for Best Individual Short Story (Dramatic) in 1972 for "The Demon Within", in House of Mystery #201 (with Jim Aparo).

Albano's most famous co-creation is the western anti-hero Jonah Hex for DC Comics; he was the writer of books ranging from Adventure Comics to House of Mystery to Archie. Albano wrote stories for comic book novels and wrote for Archie Comics until about 2003.

Albano also had a single-panel newspaper cartoon, X-Rays, the depicted normally seen and normally unseen parts of a scene. The panel ran from September 14, 1964, to February 27, 1965.

Albano died in an Orlando hospital after suffering a heart attack and subsequent stroke. He was still active and was working on a musical play at the time of his death. He was 82.

Preceded by Mike Sekowsky	Adventure Comics writer 1971–1973	Succeeded by Steve Skeates
Preceded by Steve Skeates	Plastic Man writer 1977	Succeeded by n/a
