= Feud (disambiguation) =

A feud is long-running argument or conflict between two parties.

Feud may also refer to:

== Arts and entertainment ==
=== Film ===
- The Feud (1910 film), an American silent film
- The Feud (1919 film), a lost silent film drama
- The Feud, a 1926 American film featuring Earle Foxe
- The Feud, a 1955 Hong Kong film featuring Kenneth Tsang
- The Feud, a 1989 American film based on Thomas Berger's novel (see below), directed by Bill D'Elia
- The Feud, a 2019 American film directed by Randall Maclowry for the television series American Experience

=== Television ===
- Feud (professional wrestling), a storyline rivalry in professional wrestling
- Feud (American TV series), a 2017–2024 anthology series
- Feud (Chinese TV series), a 2025 fantasy series
- The Feud (TV series), a 2025 British drama series

==== Episodes ====
- "Feud" (The Brak Show)
- "Feud" (The Elephant Princess)
- "Feud" (Glee)
- "Feud" (Lassie)
- "Feud" (Watching Ellie)
- "The Feud" (The Army Game)
- "The Feud" (Arthur)
- "The Feud" (Blondie)
- "The Feud" (Date with the Angels)
- "The Feud" (Hidden Hills)
- "The Feud" (Mad About You)
- "The Feud" (Memphis Beat)
- "The Feud" (Modern Family)
- "The Feud" (Reba)
- "The Feud" (The Roy Rogers Show)
- "The Feud" (Wildfire)

=== Other media ===
- Feud (video game), a 1987 computer game for 8- and 16-bit home computers
- The Feud (novel), a 1983 novel by Thomas Berger

== See also ==
- Blood Feud (disambiguation)
- Family Feud (disambiguation)
- Feudal (disambiguation)
- Fief (Latin: feudum), land held under the feudal system
