= Alignment (role-playing games) =

Categorization for character ethics and morals

In some role-playing games (RPGs), alignment is a categorization of the moral and ethical perspective of the player characters, non-player characters, monsters, and societies in the game. Not all role-playing games have such a system, and some narrativist role-players consider such a restriction on their characters' outlook on life to be overly constraining. However, some regard a concept of alignment to be essential to role-playing, since they regard role-playing as an exploration of the themes of good and evil. A basic distinction can be made between alignment typologies, based on one or more sets of systematic moral categories, and mechanics that either assign characters a degree of adherence to a single set of ethical characteristics or allow players to incorporate a wide range of motivations and personality characteristics into gameplay.

== Alignment typologies ==
=== Dungeons & Dragons ===
The original Dungeons & Dragons (D&D) game created a three-alignment system of law, neutrality and chaos. In Advanced Dungeons & Dragons, this became a two-dimensional grid, one axis of which measures a "moral" continuum between good and evil, and the other "ethical" between law and chaos, with a middle ground of "neutrality" on both axes for those who are indifferent, committed to balance, or lacking the capacity to judge. This system was retained more or less unchanged through the 2nd and 3rd editions of the game. By combining the two axes, any given character has one of nine possible alignments:

Law vs chaos Good vs evil	Lawful	Neutral	Chaotic
Good	Lawful good	Neutral good	Chaotic good
Neutral	Lawful neutral	(True) neutral	Chaotic neutral
Evil	Lawful evil	Neutral evil	Chaotic evil

Neutral in this scheme can be one of two versions: Neutral, those who have no interest in (or no ability to care about) the choice between Good and Evil or Law and Chaos; or "True Neutral", meaning those who not only actively remain neutral but believe it is necessary to enforce the balance of the world on others, and would act in any required fashion to bring about that balance. According to Ian Livingstone, alignment is "often criticized as being arbitrary and unreal, but... it works if played well and provides a useful structural framework on which not only characters but governments and worlds can be moulded."

In the 4th edition of the game, the alignment system was simplified, reducing the number of alignments to five. The 5th edition of D&D returned to the previous two-axis system. However, it also decoupled alignment from most of the D&D game mechanics; instead, alignment in this edition is more of a flexible roleplaying guide.

=== Warhammer FRP ===
Warhammer Fantasy Roleplay originally used a linear five-place system: Law – Good – Neutral – Evil – Chaos. In changes of alignment (for whatever reason) a character moved one place along to the next position (e.g.: a neutral character could move to good or evil but not to chaotic).

In practice, the system was used to regulate reactions between characters of different alignments.

In the newer edition, the concept of alignment (and the presence of Law as the antithesis of Chaos) has been discarded, with more emphasis on the personalities and unique natures of characters, rather than a linear alignment system.

=== Palladium ===
Palladium uses a system where alignments are described in detailed terms of how a character acts in a certain situation: whether they will lie, how much force they will use against innocents, how they view the law, and so on. The alignments are organized into three broad categories: Good, Selfish, and Evil. The seven core alignments are Principled (Good), Scrupulous (Good), Unprincipled (Selfish), Anarchist (Selfish), Aberrant (Evil), Miscreant (Evil), and Diabolic (Evil). An eighth alignment, Taoist, was introduced in the Mystic China supplement, but has not seen wide use.

Each category contains answers to a set of questions on moral behaviours. For example, given the question "Would you keep a wallet full of cash you found?", most selfish or evil alignments would keep it, while most good alignments would seek to return the wallet to its owner. The categories are not organized into a pattern like Dungeons & Dragons. The system specifically does not include any sort of "neutral" alignment on the grounds that a neutral point of view is antithetical to the active role heroes and villains should play in a story.

=== Star Wars ===
The alignments of the Wizards of the Coast Star Wars Roleplaying Game are limited to "light side" and "dark side", though there are variations within these.

In the older West End Games version of the game, behaviour is controlled with Force points which indicate one use of it per point. When using The Force for evil deeds, the character gains a Dark Side point which can accumulate and put the character at risk of being turned to the Dark Side at a periodic die role, at which point the player loses control of their character and becomes a non-player villain character. By contrast, heroic deeds using The Force allow the player to remove the point. In addition, using The Force heroically at a dramatically appropriate moment, such as Luke Skywalker firing his proton torpedoes in the Death Star's exhaust port in the Battle of Yavin, enables the player to not only regain the force point but also gain another.

== Other mechanics for character motivation and ethics ==
=== World of Darkness ===
Characters in White Wolf's old World of Darkness (WoD) games have "Nature" and "Demeanour" characteristics that describe how the characters really are and how they behave superficially. The Nature and Demeanour are freeform, allowing players to create new types.

Additionally, in White Wolf's Vampire: The Masquerade and derivatives (such as Ghouls: Fatal Addiction), vampire and human characters may have a "Humanity" trait ranging from 0 to 10. The higher levels are the compassionate and humane while the lower levels are psychopathic (further enhanced by the predatory nature of the vampire psyche). The average non-magic human has a Humanity score of about 7 or 8. Other paths (moral philosophies) were created for vampire types. The path mechanic was sharply criticized for providing an "out" for gamers to avoid having to pay for inhumane actions with in-game penalties that are supposed to be exacted from a character on the humanity path. Kindred of the East provided a system for "dharmas" which superficially resembled path mechanics, but was meant to represent the character's mastery of an occult philosophy rather than to gauge its moral state.

This has changed with the re-imagining of the World of Darkness setting. In the new editions of the White Wolf games (new World of Darkness, Vampire: The Requiem, Mage: The Awakening, etc.), all characters have a morality trait ranked from 0 to 10, though what it is called varies from game to game, and what sorts of behaviour will raise or lower it depend on the character type as well (in Vampire: The Requiem it is still called humanity and is affected by the same behaviours). In addition to this, all characters have a virtue and a vice based upon the traditional seven of each, which represents their major (though not only) vice and virtue. This is intended to illustrate that even the very good are never perfect, although characters with a score closer to 10 will be much more capable of avoiding evil behaviour while characters of lower moral tone will begin to care less about such and simply revel in being wicked.

Additionally, unlike Dungeons & Dragons in which every character is subject to at least a cursory moral classification, not all World of Darkness characters are subject to morality. Some beings, such as very old and very powerful Spirits (like the Idigam), or entities from the Abyss (like the Acamoth) are beyond manifest conception and thus are outside any measure of useful definition.

Unlike the majority of other role-playing games, the World of Darkness "alignment" system is meant not to reflect philosophical convictions about "right" and "wrong", which are left entirely up to the creator of the character. Instead, they represent the generalities of the character's state of mind. Believing in or adhering to a certain set of abstract moralisms is not considered to be as strong a motivating factor as the concrete conditions of what a character's personality may bring them to do. While philosophical moralism may play a strong role in a character's thought, lifestyle, and development, these may be violated with only minor to moderate repercussions, depending on the situation, while striking out against a character's basic temperament carries strong psychological consequences, and the behaviour of comprehensively changing a character's disposition takes a great deal of time and diligence. This system was designed specifically by White Wolf in order to avoid having characters pigeonholed as stereotypical heroes and villains who are often driven by beliefs so strong they seem to be psychic imperatives. It was created with the goal in mind of enforcing the moral and ethical "grey area" within which the World of Darkness setting as a whole resides, and generating focus around the struggle of each character throughout the Chronicle (WoD Campaign) to reconcile their personality with their beliefs and the situations which test them.

=== d20 Modern ===
d20 Modern uses "allegiance", an ordered list of groups and ideals the character is aligned with, ranked in approximate order of increasing priority. Characters' allegiances determine a 'rule of thumb' for their reactions to situations, in that they will generally favour the interests or outlook of their highest allegiance, or their next where the first does not apply. This generally allows for snap-decisions on moral or ethical questions, in keeping with the rapid pace of gameplay.

=== DC Heroes ===
DC Heroes from Mayfair Games (now known as MEGS, Mayfair Exponential Game System) used the characteristic "motivation" to describe a character's ethical behaviour. This is selected from a list divided into "heroic" (upholding the good, responsibility of power, seeking justice, thrill of adventure, and unwanted power) and "villainous" (mercenary, thrill seeker, psychopath, power lust, and nihilist). In the MEGS licensed game Blood of Heroes by Pulsar Games, a set of "anti-heroic" variations on some of the heroic and villainous motivations were presented, allowing characters to exist in moral and ethical gray areas.

To enforce the motivations, players are awarded or deducted character points, which have various uses, depending on their actions. For instance, good characters are awarded points for good and heroic behaviour while evil behaviour can cost them.

=== GURPS ===
GURPS uses "mental disadvantages" to model the personality of character ("good" and "evil" personality traits are disadvantages because they limit or impose behaviour). Mental disadvantages include ordinary personality traits (honest, curious, shy, bad temper), phobias (scotophobia, triskaidekaphobia), mental illnesses (delusions, hallucinations, bipolar disorder), and various self- or externally imposed behaviours (vow, code of honour, addiction). Characters gain extra development points by taking disadvantages, allowing them to buy more advantages and skills. However, only the extremes of behaviour are defined as strong disadvantages, while normal predilections and preferences are referred to as "quirks". Also, if a normally-disadvantageous personality trait is used for a character in a game where it would actually be advantageous, it is termed an advantage and costs points.

=== Unknown Armies ===
Characters in Unknown Armies (UA) have "passions": specific stimuli that bring out certain behaviours and reflect the character's deepest personality traits. Every character has one "fear passion" that gives the character a bonus chance to escape a specific kind of frightening stimulus, one "rage passion" that helps the character lash out against a particular frustrating stimulus, and one "noble passion" that provides a bonus to selfless behaviour for the sake of some greater cause. Passions are invented freeform during character creation, but each fear passion is tied to one of the five types of psychological stress in UA: violence, helplessness, isolation, self, or the unnatural.

=== Alternate methods ===
Some games have used other methods to encourage certain behaviours. For instance, superhero games like Marvel Super-Heroes and DC Heroes each have points that players could earn with heroic behaviour or lose with inappropriate actions. Given that these points could be used to improve their characters, or affect dice roll results in their favour, the players have an incentive to have their characters behave heroically and morally to earn them. The Star Wars RPG by West End Games uses the rules governing the use of the Force for the same purpose.
