= An Element of Danger =

1986 role-playing adventure based on DC Comics

Cover art by Ed Hannigan, Denys Cowan, Bob Smith, and Bob LeRose, 1986

An Element of Danger is an adventure published by Mayfair Games in 1986 for the superhero role-playing game DC Heroes that features several superheroes from DC Comics.

== Plot summary ==
The player characters, members of the Justice League of America, learn that Mr. Element and Matter Master have escaped from prison. The heroes must find and stop the two villains before they can combine their signature weapons into a weapon of mass destruction. The players can generate their own superheroes using the rules in DC Heroes, or they can use the pre-generated characters for Firestorm, Firehawk, Hawkman, and Hawkwoman.

== Publication history ==
Mayfair Games published the superhero role-playing game DC Heroes in 1985. An Element of Danger was published the following year, a 32-page softcover book by Steve Perrin, with cartography by Jerry O'Malley and Greg Scott, and cover art by Ed Hannigan (sketch), Denys Cowan (pencil), Bob Smith (inks), and Bob LeRose (color).

== Reception ==
Pete Tamlyn reviewed An Element of Danger for White Dwarf #88, and was disappointed in the adventure: "Sadly, it is rather dull. I had a suspicion that Steve [Perrin] hacked this one out in a couple of days. It is uninteresting, unexciting and has a deus ex machina ending which makes the whole thing a waste of time. Not recommended".

== Reviews ==
- Comics Feature #56
