= Don't Ask! =

Cover art by Ed Hannigan, Keith Giffen, Bob Smith, and Bob LeRose, 1986

Don't Ask! is an adventure published by Mayfair Games in 1986 for the superhero role-playing game DC Heroes that features Ambush Bug from DC Comics.

== Plot summary ==
Lex Luthor announces that he is taking control of Time, but Ambush Bug intervenes, and takes control of Time himself. The heroes must battle Luthor, Ambush Bug and perfect copies of themselves in order to save the universe.

== Publication history ==
Mayfair Games published the superhero role-playing game DC Heroes in 1985. Don't Ask! was published the following year, a 32-page softcover book by Scott Jenkins with Robert Loren Fleming, with interior art by Rob Davis, cartography by James Clouse, and cover art by Ed Hannigan (sketch), Keith Giffen (pencil), Bob Smith (ink), and Bob LeRose (color).

== Reception ==
Pete Tamlyn reviewed Don't Ask! for White Dwarf #88, and thought the whole thing was an in joke, stating that "you need to be a comic fan (and a DC aficionado in particular) in order to understand many of the jokes. That gives the adventure a much more limited audience".

== Reviews ==
- Comics Feature #56
