= Eternity Inc. =

Eternity Inc. is an adventure published by Mayfair Games in 1986 for the superhero role-playing game (RPG) DC Heroes.

== Plot summary ==
Eternity Inc. is an adventure in which the player characters are members of the Los Angeles-based superhero team Infinity, Inc. They are called to the Page Museum when it is invaded by prehistoric animals, and find themselves pitted against Gorilla Grodd and his Neanderthal sorcerers.

== Publication history ==
Mayfair Games first published the superhero RPG DC Heroes in 1985. The 32-page adventure Eternity Inc. was published the following year, written by Lawrence Schick, with interior art by DC Comics staff, Gideon and Jerry O'Malley, cartography by Jimmy Clouse, and cover art by Ed Hannigan, Denys Cowan, Bob Smith, and Bob LeRose.

== Reception ==
Pete Tamlyn reviewed Eternity Inc. for White Dwarf #84, and wrote that "the plot is not in any way dependant on the nature of the heroes. It could be run for anyone, which is another useful aspect. Recommended".
