= King of Crime =

Tabletop role-playing game supplement

King of Crime is an adventure published by Mayfair Games in 1986 for the superhero role-playing game DC Heroes.

== Plot summary ==
King of Crime is an introductory adventure meant to show new players how to generate and run superhero player characters. The adventure is set in Central City, where the superheroes will face members of the Secret Society of Super Villains, organized by the King of Crime.

== Publication history ==
Mayfair Games first published the superhero role-playing game DC Heroes in 1985. The introductory adventure King of Crime was published the following year, a 32-page softcover book written by Jeff O'Hare, with cover art by Ed Hannigan, Carmine Infantino, and Bob Smith, interior art by Rob Davis, and cartography by James Clouse.

== Reception ==
In White Dwarf #84, Pete Tamlyn was disappointed in this product: "The bad guys are well known [ DC Comics ] cannon fodder. Unfortunately the Central City background isn't a patch on [Marvel Super Heroes]'s New York, and the adventure plot is like something out of the Batman TV series. I think the problem is that the project was beyond the scope of a 32 page package, and it wasn't helped by having an editor who wouldn't even keep the mayor's name constant throughout the booklet".

== Reviews ==
- Comics Feature #53
