= Blood Feud =

A blood feud is a feud, usually between families, with a cycle of retaliatory violence.

Blood Feud may also refer to:

== Film and television ==
- Blood Feud (1978 film), an Italian thriller by Lina Wertmüller
- Blood Feud (1983 film), a TV miniseries starring Robert Blake
- Pumpkinhead: Blood Feud, a 2007 television horror film
- "Blood Feud" (The Simpsons), a 1991 episode of The Simpsons
- "Blood Feud" (Zevo-3), an episode of Zevo-3
- "Blood Feud", an episode of The Rough Riders
- "Bloodfeud", an episode of The Borderers

== Other uses ==
- Blood Feud (novel), a 1976 historical fiction novel by Rosemary Sutcliff
- Blood Feud (Sharp book), a 2011 non-fiction book by Kathleen Sharp
- Rohan: Blood Feud, a 2008 computer game
- Blood Feud!, a 1985 role-playing game adventure for DC Heroes
- Albanian blood feud

== See also ==
- Feud (disambiguation)
- Vendetta (disambiguation)
