= The Law of Darkness =

1990 superhero role-playing adventure

- Cover art by Paris Cullins and Mike DeCarlo
- Designers: Scott Paul Maykrantz
- Illustrators: Maria Cabardo; Paris Cullins; DC Comics Inc. Staff; Mike DeCarlo; Bob LeRose; Mark Maykrantz
- Publishers: Mayfair Games
- Publication: 1990
- Genres: Superhero

The Law of Darkness is an adventure published by Mayfair Games in 1990 for the superhero role-playing game DC Heroes.

== Description ==
The Law of Darkness is a "world-hopping adventure" in which the heroes oppose Darkseid, who is seeking out the Anti-Life Equation, aided by DeSaad and Granny Goodness. The heroes also have to contend with Acidic Blobs, Slow-Down Gas, the Deathmaker robot from Studio X, Parademons, Bug Warriors, and a Devolution Cube. If the heroes fail, Darkseid will succeed in taking over the galaxy.

Both Lawrence Schick and Allen Varney suggested this adventure is only suitable for the high level characters of the DC Heroes universe known as New Gods.

The adventure introduces a number of new gadgets, as well as new rules concerning chases.

== Publication history ==
The Law of Darkness was written by Scott Paul Maykrantz, and was published by Mayfair Games in 1990 as a 48-page book with a cover by Paris Cullins and Mike DeCarlo, and interior art by Maria Cabardo, the DC Comics staff, Bob LeRose, and Mark Maykrantz.

== Reception ==
In Issue 165 of Dragon, Allen Varney felt that, like other DC Heroes adventures, "once again the adventure's ending falls slightly flat, but getting there should be a roller coaster ride worthy of the original Jack Kirby stories of the New Gods." Varney concluded by warning, "But don't try to run this plot with a different group of heroes!"

In Issue 26 of White Wolf, Gene Alloway noted that this adventure "has all the hallmarks of a well-thought out adventure. It has history, interesting characters and villains, and definite consequence for failure." Alloway liked the flowchart of encounters at the start of the adventure to make the gamemaster's life easier, and called the production values "high quality, both in terms of esthetics and unique flavoring elements." Alloway concluded by giving this adventure a rating of 4 out of 5, saying, "This is an excellent product and recommended very highly. Buy this one if you get no other adventure."
