= Batman Sourcebook =

Role-playing game supplement about Batman

Batman Sourcebook is a supplement about Batman published by Mayfair Games in 1986 and again in 1989 for the superhero role-playing game DC Heroes.

== Publication history ==
Mayfair Games published the DC Heroes role-playing game in 1985, then published the 80-page supplement Batman the following year, written by Mike Stackpole, with cover art by Ed Hannigan. In 1989, Mayfair Games published an updated 96-page softcover Batman Sourcebook, again written by Mike Stackpole, with additional material by J. Santana, Louis Prosperi, Jack Barker and Ray Winninger, graphic design by Gregory Scott, with cover and interior art by DC Comics staff.

== Contents ==
This book contains:

- game statistics for a large number of people and places connected to Batman.
- essays on Batman's relationship to Superman, his role in the Justice League, and his possible psychoses.
- a sample adventure for the referee and a single player (playing Batman).
- maps of Wayne Manor, the Wayne Foundation and the multi-level Batcave.

== Reception ==
In the August–September 1986 edition of Adventurer (issue #3), the reviewer thought the first edition of this supplement was "a reference work of great value to anybody wishing to play the part of Batman, or interested in his friends and foes". The reviewer called "an excellent piece of research, well supported with illustrations and plenty of detail".

In the November 1986 edition of Isaac Asimov's Science Fiction Magazine, game designed Dana Lombardy called this "a tour-de-force of Bat-information, from what’s on the famous utility belt to an oversized map of the Wayne Foundation and the Batcave." While Lombardy noted that the book was designed to be used with DC Comics role-playing games, "it's [just] fun to read about the Dark Knight and his strange menagerie of foes."

Russell Grant Collins reviewed Batman Sourcebook and Wheel of Destruction for Different Worlds magazine and stated that "In conclusion, I'd have to say that I like the Batman Sourcebook, but I found a lot left to be desired in Wheel Of Destruction. Pick up the former, but skip the latter unless you're really desperate for a Batman module and are willing to do a little work before running it."

In Issue 44 of Abyss (Fall 1989), Ian Hense thought the book was "very well written." However, with such a detailed and original character and history, Hense questioned "where does the role-playing come in it? Is the player supposed to play Batman? If so, then I find it difficult to see the interest of the challenge. If, however, the idea is to use the world of the Caped Crusader as a background for your own heroes and characters, then the Batman Sourcebook is worth the price of admission."

In Issue 39 of the French games magazine Casus Belli, Jean Demesse wrote, "In short, this sourcebook is a must. If you've ever been interested in superheroes, whether or not you play DC Heroes, you need this book."

In the January 1990 edition of Games International (issue #12), Mike Jarvis reviewed the second edition, and found the mixture of upper and lower case letters in section titles to be "messy". Although he enjoyed reading the descriptions of famous Batman foes — "a delight to read" — what drew his interest was the essays about Batman. Although he thought the included scenario was "nothing spectacular, it should prove entertaining enough". He concluded by giving this supplement an above-average rating of 4 out of 5: "This is a high quality product [...] If all the supplements for the new edition of DC Heroes reach this standard then the future of superhero gaming looks rosy indeed".

In the January 1991 edition of Dragon (issue #165), Allen Varney was impressed with the second edition of the book, calling it a "polished update of one of the original edition's best supplements". Varney called the included adventure "snappy", but called the ending as "a bit flat". Although Varney did not like the book's graphic design, saying "all the titles look like ransom notes!", he concluded that the book's contents were impressive and complete.

== Reviews ==
- Games Review (volume 2, issue #5 - Feb 1990)
- Comics Feature #46
