= Pawns of Time =

Tabletop role-playing game adventure

Cover art by Ed Hannigan, Curt Swan, Bob Smith, and Gene D'Angelo, 1986

Pawns of Time is an adventure published by Mayfair Games in 1986 for the superhero role-playing game DC Heroes, the first in the four-part "Chessman" series.

== Plot summary ==
Pawns of Time is the first in a series of four adventures involving the Legion of Super Heroes versus the Time Trapper. The player characters, each a member of the Legion, along with Brainiac 5, are ambushed by six former Legionnaires thought to have died. The "dead" superheroes are now agents of the Time Trapper, who has summoned them from the past and brainwashed them into working for him. Following the ambush, the agents successfully kidnap the comatose Jaxon Rugarth (formerly Legion enemy "The Infinite Man"). The player characters determine that the Time Trapper is trying to turn Rugarth back into The Infinite Man, and must act to stop him.

== Publication history ==
Mayfair Games published the superhero role-playing game DC Heroes in 1985. Pawns of Time, Book 1 of the Chessman series, was released the following year, a 32-page softcover book written by Steve Crow and Chris Mortika, with cartography by James Clouse, and cover art by Ed Hannigan (layout), Curt Swan (pencils), Bob Smith (inks), and Gene D'Angelo (colors). Three more books in the Chessman series were published in 1987: Knight to Planet 3, Mad Rook's Gambit, and King for All Time.

== Reception ==
Pete Tamlyn reviewed Pawns of Time for White Dwarf #88, and was ambivalent, concluding: "Pawns of Time is not a bad adventure, but neither is it a particularly good one. The main thing it has going for it is that the players never get to find out who was really behind what was happening and will therefore be keen to play the next part".
