= Siege (disambiguation) =

A siege is a military blockade and assault of a city or fortress with the intent of conquering. For a list of sieges, see list of sieges.

Siege, The Siege, Besiege or Besieged may also refer to:

== Books and comics ==
=== Fiction ===
- The Siege (Dunmore novel), by Helen Dunmore, 2001
- The Siege (Kadare novel), by Ismail Kadare, 1970
- The Siege (Forgotten Realms novel), the second novel of the Return of the Archwizards trilogy by Troy Denning
- Guardians of Ga'Hoole Book 4: The Siege, the fourth novel in the Guardians of Ga'hoole series
- Siege (comics), a 2010 Marvel Comics storyline
- Siege (character), a Marvel Comics character
- The Siege: Selected Stories, a book by James Lasdun, including the title story, basis for the Bertolucci film
- Siege, a 1924 novel by Samuel Hopkins Adams
- Siege, a 1969 novel by Edwin Corley
- Siege (Spanish: El Asedio), a 2010 novel by Arturo Pérez-Reverte

=== Nonfiction ===
- Siege (Mason book), an essay collection, and a newsletter, by the American neo-Nazi James Mason
- Siege: Trump Under Fire, a 2019 book by Michael Wolff
- The Siege: The Attack on the Taj, a 2013 book by Cathy Scott-Clark and Adrian Levy about the 2008 Mumbai attacks
- The Siege: The First Eight Years of an Autistic Child, a 1967 book by Clara Claiborne Park

== Film ==
- Siege (1925 film), an American film
- Siege (1940 film), a documentary short by Julien Bryan on the 1939 Siege of Warsaw
- The Siege (1956 film), a Yugoslav war film directed by Branko Marjanović
- Siege (1983 film) or Self Defense, a Canadian action thriller film
- The Siege (1998 film), a film directed by Edward Zwick and starring Denzel Washington
- Besieged (film), a 1998 film by Bernardo Bertolucci

== Games ==
- Siege!: The Game of Siege Warfare, 50 AD-1400 AD, 1974 board wargame by Fact and Fantasy Games
- Siege (board game), a 1984 expansion of Cry Havoc by Standard Games
- Siege (DC Heroes), a 1985 role-playing game adventure
- Siege (video game), a 1992 PC game developed by Mindcraft
- Tom Clancy's Rainbow Six Siege, a 2015 game developed by Ubisoft
- Besiege (video game), a 2020 physics building game

== Television episodes ==
- "Chapter 12: The Siege", 2020 episode of The Mandalorian
- "The Siege" (Dead Zone)
- "The Siege" (Star Trek: Deep Space Nine)
- "The Siege" (Stargate Atlantis)

== Other uses ==
- The Siege (play), a 2002 Palestinian play by The Freedom Theatre
- Siege (software), a Hypertext Transfer Protocol (HTTP/HTTPS) testing utility
- Siege (band), a 1980s American punk band
- Besieged (band), an American Christian band
- "The Siege", a song by Europe from the album Walk the Earth

== See also ==
- Siege Perilous (disambiguation)
- Under Siege (disambiguation)
