= Countdown to Armageddon (DC Heroes) =

Countdown to Armageddon is a 1986 role-playing game adventure published by Mayfair Games for DC Heroes.

== Plot summary ==
Countdown to Armageddon is an adventure in which Superman is presented with four simultaneous disasters, requiring careful time management. Meanwhile, a greater threat looms, orchestrated by one of his oldest and deadliest foes. The player must balance heroic action with Superman's Clark Kent persona, ensuring he still makes his 6pm news broadcast. The module includes Clark Kent's business card, press pass, and appointment book as in-game props.

Countdown to Armageddon is a solo or gamemaster-led adventure scenario which pits Superman against Brainiac, who intends to eliminate all human life and replace it with mechanical beings. The adventure features heroic moments such as saving a train from disaster and preventing a dam from bursting. It also includes a cardstock sheet with Clark Kent's identification cards.

== Publication history ==
Countdown to Armageddon was written by Dan Greenberg with a cover by Ed Hannigan and published by Mayfair Games in 1986 as a 40-page book with a cardstock sheet.

== Reception ==
Thomas A. Grant reviewed Countdown to Armageddon for Different Worlds magazine and stated that "Countdown is just what a DC Heroes scenario should be: exciting, dangerous, imaginative, and entertaining."

== Reviews ==
- Comics Feature #52
