= Come on Down!! =

Superhero role-playing game adventure

Cover art by Paris Cullins and Romeo Tanghal

Come on Down!! is an adventure published by Mayfair Games in 1990 for the superhero role-playing game DC Heroes, which features characters from the DC Comics universe.

== Description ==
A tape with secret information about the Justice League Europe has fallen into the hands of Mangha Khan, a nemesis from a previous adventure. Khan puts the tape up as a prize in a galactic game show. The player characters must take part in the game show, which ends in a brawl.

== Publication history ==
The superhero role-playing game DC Heroes, was published by Mayfair Games in 1985, and a second edition was released in 1989. The first full-length adventure to be published for the new edition was Come on Down!!, written by Ray Winninger and Jack Barker, with cover art by Paris Cullins and Romeo Tanghal, and interior art by the DC Comics staff. It was published by Mayfair in 1990 as a 32-page folio.

== Reception ==
In Issue 26 of White Wolf (April/May 1991), Gene Alloway found this adventure to be too lightweight, pointing out the final brawl has a pie fight, and commenting, "Given the fact that this adventure was done with a humorous bent, such silliness is not out of line. More serious players will find it juvenile and uninteresting. The consequences of the tape falling into the wrong hands is not really stressed, so character motivation may be low." Alloway concluded by giving this adventure only 2 out of 5, saying, "the scenario is easy to play, but not challenging to experienced gamers. If you are interested in a lighter evening or afternoon of gaming, then try this."
