= DC Adventures =

Tabletop role-playing game

Cover art by Alex Ross, 2010

DC Adventures is a superhero role-playing game published by Green Ronin Publishing in 2010 that is set in the DC Comics superhero universe. It uses the same game system as Green Ronin's third edition of Mutants & Masterminds.

== Description ==
DC Adventures sets out the rules for setting up and running a superhero campaign. It includes details of 14 DC superheroes, and 14 super villains. A number of notable areas from the DC universe are described, including cities such as Metropolis and Gotham City, countries such as Markovia and Zandia, alien planets such as Oa, and even different dimensions such as Earth-0 and The Dreaming.

Both Mutants & Masterminds and DC Adventures have the same mechanical system and are fully compatible.

== Publication history ==
DC had previously granted the license for a role-playing game to Mayfair Games in 1985 (DC Heroes), and West End Games in 1999 (DC Universe Roleplaying Game). As game historian Shannon Appelcline explained in the 2014 book Designers & Dragons: The '00s that the license moved on to Games Workshop, who did not use it, then to Green Ronin, who published DC Adventures (2010), based on their popular d20-based Mutants & Masterminds system.

As Appelcline noted, Green Ronin created a third edition of their Mutants & Masterminds rules specifically for DC Adventures, and then produced DC Adventures: Hero's Handbook in 2010, a 280-page hard cover book designed by Steve Kenson and Ray Winninger, with interior artwork by DC artists, and cover art by Alex Ross. This was followed by two Heroes & Villains books (2011-2012), and DC Adventures Universe (2013).

Green Ronin also produced a non DC version of the rules titled, Mutants & Masterminds Hero's Handbook in 2011, followed by the Mutants & Masterminds Gamemaster's Guide in 2012.

Green Ronin ran into a major problem when, shortly after the release of DC Adventures, DC Comics suddenly rebooted their entire comic book universe with The New 52, instantly making the material in DC Adventures obsolete.

== Reception ==
Ed Grabianowski for the website io9 said that "the four books that comprise the DC Adventures RPG present you not only with a tried and tested superhero RPG, but also an incredibly deep roster of DC characters and the most comprehensive overview of the DC universe I've ever seen".

Superhero RPGs thought the artwork "is as good as it gets", but noted that the super-strength of the heroes made life difficult for the gamemaster. The conclusion was that this was a well-designed game.

Flames Rising reviewed DC Adventures: Heroes and Villains: Volume 1, and thought that the writing was crisp, entertaining and educational. Although the reviewer noted that players actually had to buy two other books in order to play this game, the conclusion was that "it's totally worth it".

== Awards ==
- At the 2011 ENnie Awards, DC Adventures Hero's Handbook was awarded a Silver for "Best Interior Art of 2010". The related Mutants & Masterminds Hero's Handbook was a finalist for "Best Cover Art of 2010".
- At the 2012 ENnie Awards, DC Adventures: Heroes and Villains, Vol. 1 was awarded "Best Monster/Adversary of 2011".

== Product list ==
- Hero's Handbook (2010)
- Heroes & Villains, Vol. 1 (2011)
- Heroes & Villains, Vol. 2 (2012)
- DC Universe (April 2013)
