= Swamp Thing (DC Heroes) =

- Publisher: Mayfair Games
- Publication date: 1991

Swamp Thing is a 1991 role-playing supplement for DC Heroes published by Mayfair Games.

== Contents ==
Swamp Thing is a supplement in which the history of the Swamp Thing is explored, and contains a solitaire adventure.

== Publication history ==
Shannon Appelcline noted that although Mayfair was closing down their other role-playing lines by 1993, "It looked like DC Heroes might continue, as it was reaching a new creative high in its final years. Swamp Thing (1991), Magic (1992) and Who's Who in the DC Universe 2 (1992) all covered new ground for the game by detailing people and places that were then gelling into DC's new Vertigo universe (1993)."

== Reception ==
Gene Alloway reviewed Swamp Thing Sourcebook in White Wolf #32 (July/Aug., 1992), rating it a 3 out of 5 and stated that "I do recommend this as an important work for any individual or group using the Swamp Thing character, or even interested in doing so. They will learn a lot, and have fun as well."

== Reviews ==
- Dragon (Issue 172 - Aug 1991)
- GamesMaster International (Issue 7 - Feb 1991)
