= The Otherwhere Quest =

Superhero role-playing game adventure

Cover art by Arne Starr

The Otherwhere Quest is an adventure published by Mayfair Games in 1990 for the superhero role-playing game DC Heroes, which features characters from the DC Comics universe.

== Plot summary ==
The Otherwhere Quest is an solitaire adventure in which the player takes on the role of Green Lantern, called to the parallel dimension of Otherwhere to save it from evil Subjugators. Before starting the adventure, the player can choose from one of three different Green Lanterns: Hal Jordan, Guy Gardner, or John Stewart.

Play is similar to the Fighting Fantasy series of solo adventure books published in the early 1980s by Games Workshop: The player reads a page of the adventure and is given several options, each one of which sends the player to a different page of the book to face more options and decisions. There is a time limit to the adventure, tracked by checking off "time boxes." If the player checks off all the boxes before reaching a successful end to the adventure, the Subjugators win.

== Publication history ==
The superhero role-playing game DC Heroes, was published by Mayfair Games in 1985, and a second edition was released in 1989. Several adventures were released for this edition, including The Otherwhere Quest, written by Ray Winninger with cover art by Arne Starr and interior art by the DC Comics staff. It was published by Mayfair Games in 1990 as a 40-page book.

== Reception ==
In Issue 26 of White Wolf (April/May 1991), Gene Alloway called the playability of the game good and noted that "The information presented is clear and interesting." Alloway warned that "Small clues can be important here. What happens if you wait for your change from the pizza delivery person instead of answering the phone?" Alloway found "its illustrations, though well done, are scarce. Also, given that there is no GM and some flavor of roleplaying will be lost in solo play, illustrations could be used to increase the excitement and to provide visual clues to the player." Despite this, Alloway concluded by giving the adventure a rating of 3 out of 5, saying, "This is a good solitaire adventure. The overall quality is high and the pace is fast enough to retain interest. Despite some weaknesses, consider this next time you are in the store."

In Issue 165 of Dragon (January 1991), Allen Varney admitted, "I've seldom enjoyed Mayfair's solo adventures, with their hundreds of tiny paragraphs of flat prose and their brief, linear plots with limited replay value." Despite this, Varney thought that "This solo features a couple of nice ideas, such as Combat Tables that let opponents use different fighting tactics, and a Power Ring Table that simulates the famous ring's open-ended Omni-Power. This serves as a useful teaching device for the DC Heroes game mechanics." But in the end, Varney was disappointed in the product, saying "as I traveled the Otherwhere (that is, moved from square to square over a flat diagram), I concluded this one-shot plot feels as flat as the Otherwhere itself."

== Other reviews ==
- Abyss #46 (Summer, 1990)
