= Batman Role-Playing Game =

Tabletop role-playing game

The Batman Role-Playing Game is a role-playing game published by Mayfair Games in 1989.

== Description ==
The Batman Role-Playing Game is a superhero system, a version of the second edition DC Heroes rules abbreviated for novice players and focusing on Batman and Gotham City. In addition to game rules and game-mastering advice, it includes statistics for Batman and all his friends and enemies, and a description and map of Gotham City. There are two scenarios: an introductory solo and a full scenario for a group of players featuring the Joker.

== Publication history ==
The Batman Role-Playing Game was designed by Jack A. Barker, Greg Gorden, and Ray Winninger, and was published by Mayfair Games in 1989 as a 192-page book. The game, a simplified version of DC Heroes, was released in 1989 to coincide with the Batman film. The second edition of the DC Heroes rules, published in 1989, incorporated material from the Batman Role-Playing Game and the Superman Sourcebook. These materials also included rules for advantages, drawbacks, and gadgetry.

== Reception ==
Paul Mason reviewed Batman Role-Playing Game for Games International magazine, and gave it 3 stars out of 5, and wrote that "it's not the perfect medium to simulate the better Batman comics, but it has potential".

Ken Cliffe reviewed The Batman Role-Playing Game for White Wolf #20, rating it 4 out of 5 overall, and wrote that "although there is no desperate need for the Batman RPG, the game still finds a niche in the game industry. I recommend it to all Batfans, whether you own DC Heroes [or] not".

In his 1990 book The Complete Guide to Role-Playing Games, game critic Rick Swan liked the game, saying, "Batman is both a nice introduction to role-playing and a competent simulation of the Caped Crusader's adventures." But although Swan gave this game a rating of 3 out of 4, he noted that Batman was essentially a stripped down DC Heroes game, and suggested "I can't think of a single reason anyone shouldn't skip this and go directly to DC Heroes, with the exception of collectors who need to own every last product with a bat emblem on it."
