= Mike DeCarlo =

American comics artist

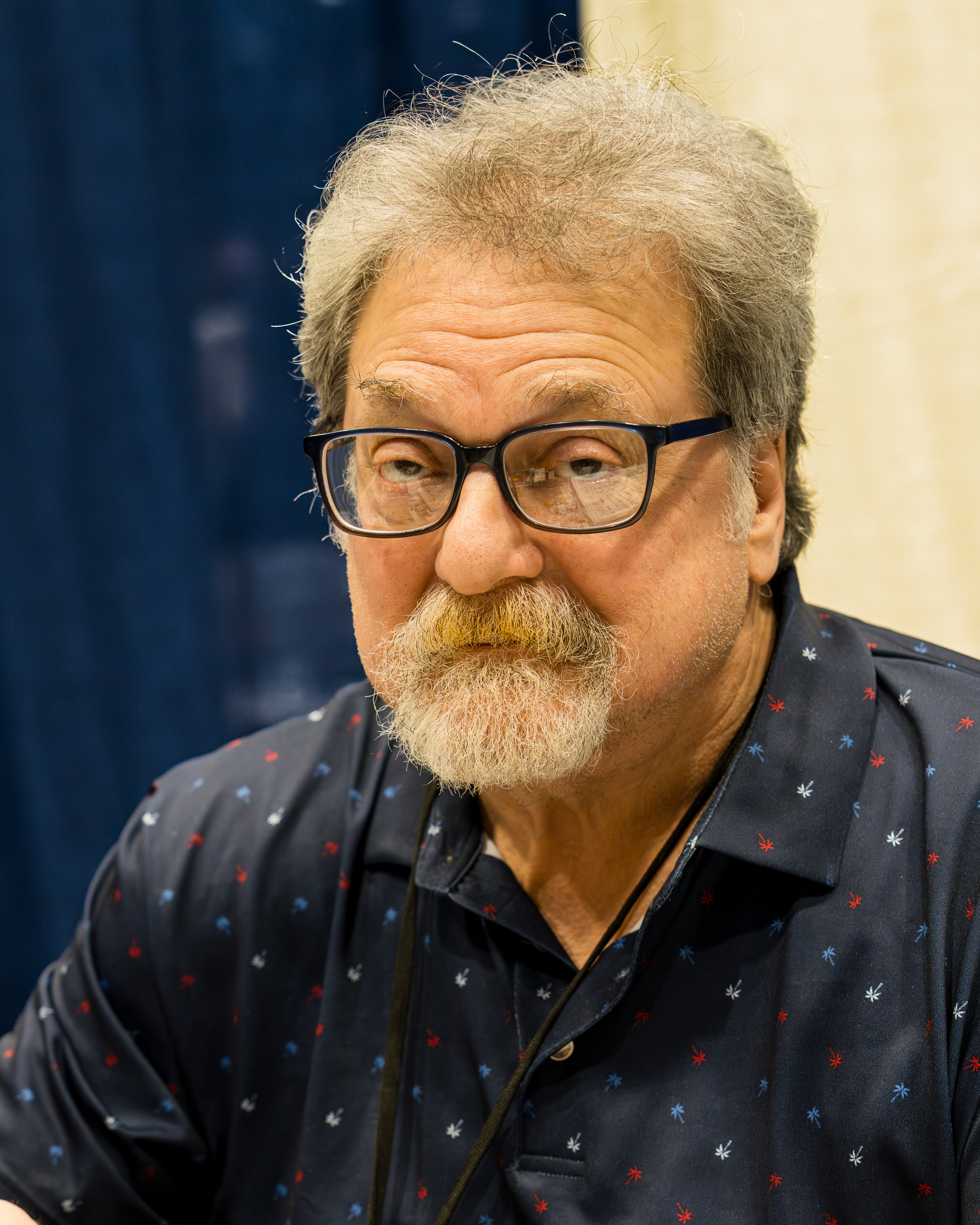
- DeCarlo at GalaxyCon Oklahoma City in 2026
- Born: March 14, 1957 (age 69)
- Area: Inker
- Notable works: "Batman: A Death in the Family"; Legion of Super-Heroes; Tales of the Teen Titans

Mike DeCarlo (born March 14, 1957) is an American comics artist. He is best known for his work for DC Comics in the 1980s inking the artwork of such artists as George Pérez, Greg LaRocque, Keith Giffen, and Jim Aparo.

DeCarlo has worked on various titles including Atari Force, Cartoon Network Block Party, Crisis on Infinite Earths, Fantastic Four, and Simpsons Comics as well as adaptations of the Warner Bros. stable of cartoons including Looney Tunes, Animaniacs, Pinky and the Brain and Superman & Bugs Bunny.

== Comics ==
Mike DeCarlo entered the comics industry as an assistant to Dick Giordano. When Giordano became an editor at DC Comics in 1980, DeCarlo became an inker in his own right. DeCarlo inked the penciled artwork of George Pérez on "The Judas Contract" storyarc in Tales of the Teen Titans with Giordano. Pérez critiqued their work in a 2003 interview stating that "While not perfect in getting the same feel [as Pérez inking the art himself], they were closer as far as the crispness that the characters needed." He inked the Legion of Super-Heroes from 1986 to 1988 first with Greg LaRocque and then briefly with Keith Giffen. As inker of the Batman comic book series, DeCarlo worked on several key storylines including the "Ten Nights of The Beast" which introduced the KGBeast; "A Death in the Family" which featured the death of the second Robin Jason Todd; and "A Lonely Place of Dying" which saw Tim Drake become the third Robin. In 2014, critic Greg Burgas of Comic Book Resources reviewed DeCarlo's inking of Jim Aparo's work on the final chapter of "Ten Nights of The Beast" commenting that "inkers who don't add roughness to Aparo's line work aren't doing him any favors. DeCarlo is better than [Bill] Wray, but he still seems to keep Aparo's work too smooth." He later adds that "I love the first image, with Batman and the Beast fighting in the sewer and the artists somehow putting their shadows on the wall. I don't know if Aparo drew this in and then DeCarlo inked it, or if DeCarlo just inked it without the benefit of pencils. It's quite cool, though."

At Marvel Comics, DeCarlo inked Conan the Barbarian, NFL SuperPro, The Mighty Thor, and What The--?!

Bongo Comics's Radioactive Man series received an Eisner Award in 2002 for "Best Humor Publication" while DeCarlo was one of the artists.

In 2025, he was awarded the Inkwell Awards Stacy Aragon Special Recognition Award.

== Role-playing games ==
DeCarlo illustrated the covers to the DC Heroes role-playing game adventures Deadly Fusion (1990) and The Law of Darkness (1990). Other products in the game line that he drew include the Who's Who in the DC Universe Role-Playing Supplement 1 (1992) and the DC Heroes Role-Playing Game (3rd Edition, 1993).

Preceded by n/a	Omega Men inker 1983–1984	Succeeded by Ricardo Villagran
Preceded by Dick Giordano	Tales of the Teen Titans inker 1984–1985	Succeeded by Romeo Tanghal
Preceded by Dick Giordano	Crisis on Infinite Earths inker 1985	Succeeded by Jerry Ordway
Preceded by Larry Mahlstedt	Legion of Super-Heroes vol. 3 inker 1986–1989	Succeeded by Al Gordon
Preceded by David Mazzucchelli	Batman inker 1987–1990	Succeeded by Dennis Janke
Preceded by Steve Montano	The Mighty Thor inker 1993–1995	Succeeded by Pat Olliffe
