= The Doomsday Program =

The Doomsday Program is a 1986 role-playing game adventure published by Mayfair Games for DC Heroes.

== Plot summary ==
The Doomsday Program is an adventure in which the player characters battle Brainiac to rescue Superman and prevent Earth from being taken out of orbit, featuring Bug-Eyed Bandit stats and details plans of Brainiac's spaceship.

== Publication history ==
The Doomsday Program was written by Mark Acres with a cover by Ed Hannigan and published by Mayfair Games in 1986 as a 32-page book.

== Reviews ==
- Comics Feature #47
