= Justice League Sourcebook =

Role-playing game supplement

Cover art by Kevin Maguire, Joe Rubinstein, and Helen Vesik

Justice League Sourcebook is a supplement published by Mayfair Games in 1990 for the superhero role-playing game DC Heroes, itself based on superheroes found in DC Comics.

== Contents ==
Justice League Sourcebook gives details about the history of the Justice League, its allies and enemies, and complete game statistics for every member to join the team since its founding.

The book covers:

- A short history of the Justice League.
- Members of the League past and present.
- How the League works and its affiliations.
- Maps of three headquarters.
- Various friends and allies of the League.
- Supervillains.

== Publication history ==
Mayfair Games first published the licensed role-playing game DC Heroes in 1985, and followed this with several supplements and adventures including the Justice League Sourcebook, a 128-page softcover book published in 1990 that was designed by Jack A. Barker and Ray Winninger, with interior illustrations by the staff of DC Comics, cartography by Mari Paz Cabardo, Jerry O'Malley, and Ike Scottand, and cover art by Kevin Maguire, Joe Rubinstein, and Helen Vesik.

== Reception ==
Gene Alloway reviewed Justice League Sourcebook in White Wolf #26 (April/May, 1991), rating it a 5 out of 5 and stated that "Without reservations, this is an essential work for playing DC Heroes. It is an excellent example of a quality work that is created for a reasonable price. If you play DC Heroes, your Universe will never be the same. If you have the game and never play it, buy this and you'll have the game out before you finish the first chapter."

In issue #172 of Dragon (August 1991), Allen Varney indicated that Justice League Sourcebook held an overwhelming amount of information, asking "Do you want your brain to explode from sheer data pressure?" Varney said his eyes started to glaze over from information overload, but admitted that the "text is clear, well-researched and respectful".
