= Deadly Fusion =

Superhero role-playing game adventure

Cover art by Carmine Infantino and Mike DeCarlo

Deadly Fusion is an adventure published by Mayfair Games in 1990 for the superhero role-playing game DC Heroes, which features characters from the DC Comics universe.

== Plot summary ==
Deadly Fusion is a 2-player adventure using a unique format. The adventure is split into six "chapters". The two players each choose to play either Batman or Superman, but not at the same time: they take turns either role-playing their superhero or being the gamemaster, switching roles at the end of each chapter. At the end of the adventure, both players role-play together.

== Publication history ==
The superhero role-playing game DC Heroes, was published by Mayfair Games in 1985, and a second edition was released in 1989. Several adventures were released for this edition, including Deadly Fusion, written by Thomas R. Cook, with cover art by Carmine Infantino and Mike DeCarlo, and interior art by the DC Comics staff. It was published by Mayfair Games in 1990 as two 40-page booklets bound into a single cardstock cover.

== Reception ==
In Issue 46 of Abyss (Summer 1990), Ian Hense thought this adventure "works fairly well during the solitary elements, but fails in the head-to-head section, where players switch booklets and give each other responses to circumstances. During the solitaire sections, I can see the non-active player getting somewhat bored." Hense found the book "fairly well written, but no amount of good writing can cover up the choppiness of a solitaire module." Hense also found the price for the book very high, noting, "at the cost of $9.00, you are looking at a large price for what is essentially a team-up comic book, without the good art, and with choppy writing." However, Hense pointed out that the background information and the details of the adventure could be adapted by a gamemaster into a good team adventure. Hense concluded with a negative recommendation, calling this "a nasty concoction [of] solitaire adventures and head-to-head role-playing thrown [together] into a neat glossy package. Buy the comic book and leave the roles of Superman and Batman to the writers."

In Issue 26 of White Wolf (April/May 1991), Gene Alloway called the two-player alternating format "one of the most unique formats I have ever seen done for an adventure and it is done well." Alloway liked the system, calling it "truly effective in that one can hardly choose which is more enjoyable, playing or GMing." However, Alloway had some issues with the physical appearance of the product, noting the difficulty of reading some text printed with a light gray background, and the lack of color art inside the booklets, unlike all other Mayfair-published adventures released for DC Heroes. Despite this, Alloway concluded by giving this adventure a rating of 3 out of 5, saying, "The story is well done, surprising and presented in a unique, though visually plain format. If you like Batman and Superman, and don't like to be the GM through the whole adventure, this is for you."
