= Siege (DC Heroes) =

Siege is a 1985 role-playing game adventure published by Mayfair Games for DC Heroes.

== Plot summary ==
Siege is an adventure in which the original Justice League of America is featured in their satellite headquarters before its destruction. The scenario involves Red Tornado, Parasite, and a newly created supervillain group attempting to take control of the JLA satellite. The module provides detailed maps.

Siege features player characters with 4,000 to 8,000 Hero Points, centering on the original Justice League of America and Red Tornado as they face Parasite and a new supervillain group, the Enforcers. It also contains a detailed description and deck plans for the JLA satellite.

== Publication history ==
Siege was written by Jerry Epperson and Craig Patterson with a cover by Ed Hannigan, and published by Mayfair Games in 1985 as a 32-page book.

Siege is the first adventure module for DC Heroes, published by Mayfair Games.

== Reception ==
Russell Grant Collins reviewed Siege for Different Worlds magazine and stated that "Only absolute completists or those with a pressing need for maps of the JLA sattelite [sic] should pick up this module. As it is, I really think it's worth waiting until they put out a Justice League sourcebook like their recent Batman soucebook [sic]."

== Reviews ==
- Comics Feature #40
