= The Superman Sourcebook =

1987 role-playing game supplement

The Superman Sourcebook is a 1987 role-playing supplement for DC Heroes published by Mayfair Games.

== Contents ==
The Superman Sourcebook is a supplement in which background is presented that covers Superman from the start of the series Superman: The Man of Steel until just before the story "The Death of Superman".

== Publication history ==
Superman Sourcebook was written by Steve Crow and Chris Mortika, with a cover by John Bryne, and was published by Mayfair Games in 1987 as a 96-page book.

== Reception ==
Gene Alloway reviewed Superman: The Man of Steel in White Wolf #34 (Jan./Feb., 1993), rating it a 4 out of 5 and stated that "Aside from my usual grumblings above, this is a superb resource for the game system, and a pretty good one to have if you are merely interested in Superman the comic book character. Stern gives the Man of Steel an excellent and worthy 'biography.' You will enjoy it."
