= Under Siege (disambiguation) =

Under Siege is a 1992 action film starring Steven Seagal.

Under Siege may also refer to:

- Under Siege, a 1986 made-for-TV film co-written by Bob Woodward
- Under Siege (US), / Hostages (UK) / Traficantes de pánico, a 1980 film directed by René Cardona Jr.
- Under Siege (2005 video game), an action/first-person shooter video game for the PC (unrelated to the 1992 film)
- Under Siege (2011 video game), a real-time tactics video game for the PlayStation 3 (unrelated to the 1992 film)
- Under Siege 2: Dark Territory, the 1995 sequel to the Steven Seagal film Under Siege
- "Under Siege (Regnum Irae)", Sepultura's third single
- Under Siege (Live in Barcelona), a 1991 live home video by Brazilian thrash metal band Sepultura
- Under Siege (novel), a 1990 novel by Stephen Coonts
- Impact Wrestling Under Siege, a 2021 professional wrestling event
- Under Siege: My Family's Fight to Save Our Nation, a 2025 book by Eric Trump

== See also ==
- Siege (disambiguation)
