= Skull & Bones (DC Comics) =

1992 DC Comics mini-series

Publication information
- Publisher: DC Comics
- Schedule: Monthly
- Format: Mini-series
- Publication date: 1992
- No. of issues: 3

Creative team
- Created by: Ed Hannigan
- Written by: Ed Hannigan
- Artist: Ed Hannigan
- Inker: Ed Hannigan
- Colorist: Alex Wald

Skull & Bones (Russian: Череп и кости, romanized: Cherep i kosti) is a three-issue graphic novel mini-series by Ed Hannigan published in 1992 by DC Comics. It is in prestige format.

== Plot ==
Following the end of the Soviet Union occupation of Afghanistan, soldier Andrian Trofimovich Linov returns home with a plan to destabilise the government. However, faced with an impending genocide, he is forced to defend the very system he sought to tear down. With the assistance of his friends Elektrik Feliks and Nadejda Kosakhova, he must stop the release of a deadly bioweapon that will cause World War III.

== Reception ==
A review in The Slings & Arrows Comic Guide stated, "Creator Ed Hannigan's art is admirably dark and his plotting dense and diligent, with not a page wasted. A true graphic novel."
