= The New Titans Sourcebook =

Superhero role-playing game adventure

Cover art by George Pérez

The New Titans Sourcebook is a supplement published by Mayfair Games in 1990 for the superhero role-playing game DC Heroes, which features characters from the DC Comics universe.

== Contents ==
The New Titans Sourcebook is a supplement in which background information is presented for each member of the Titans. Information is also included about the Justice League and its history, as well as its allies and enemies.

== Publication history ==
The superhero role-playing game DC Heroes was published by Mayfair Games in 1985, and a second edition was released in 1989. Several adventures and supplements were released for this edition, including The New Titans Sourcebook, written by John J. Terra, with cover art by George Pérez and interior art by the DC Comics staff. It was published by Mayfair Games in 1990 as a 128-page softcover book.

== Reception ==
In Issue 26 of White Wolf (April/May 1991), Gene Alloway was very impressed, commenting, "Essential for any adventure in the DC Universe, this work brings together information, art and game playing beautifully." Alloway also liked the artwork and production values, noting, "The layout of the art, images and text is simple and clear." Alloway concluded by giving this a top rating of 5 out of 5, saying, "Without reservations, this is an essential work for playing DC Heroes ... If you have the game and never play it, buy this and you'll have the game out before you finish the first chapter."

In Issue 172 of Dragon, Allen Varney asked "Do you want to know a whole lot? Do you want your brain to explode from sheer data pressure? Then ... The New Titans Sourcebook [is] for you!" Varney noted the pleasing level of detail included, pointing out that the description of the 10-level Titan Tower took 16 pages and included "the videogames in the rec room." Varney concluded, "Can there be a super-hero roster that a review could recommend wholeheartedly as an authentic 'good job'? Yes!
