= Blood Feud! =

Blood Feud! is a 1985 role-playing game adventure published by Mayfair Games for DC Heroes.

== Plot summary ==
Blood Feud! is an adventure in which the Teen Titans have a conflict against Brother Blood and the New Brotherhood of Evil, complete with game statistics for Kole and the New Brotherhood.

== Publication history ==
Blood Feud was written by Jeff O'Hare, with a cover by Ed Hannigan and Jose Delbo and published by Mayfair Games in 1985 as a 32-page book.

== Reviews ==
- Comics Feature #42
