= Snowman (comics) =

- The Snowman debuts in Batman #337.

Publication information
- Publisher: DC Comics
- First appearance: Batman #337 (July 1981)
- Created by: Gerry Conway (writer); Roy Thomas (writer); José Luis García-López (artist)

In-story information
- Alter ego: Klaus Kristin
- Species: Yeti/Human Hybrid
- Notable aliases: The Sinister Snowman, Yeti
- Abilities: Control over ice and snow Superhuman strength

The Snowman is a supervillain in Batman comics. The Snowman first appeared in Batman #337 (July 1981), and was created by Gerry Conway, Roy Thomas, and José Luis García-López.

== Fictional character biography ==
Klaus Kristin is the hybrid son of a male yeti and a woman named Katrina Kristin. While blending in with the humans, Klaus became a professional athlete. He arrived in Gotham City to commit a crime spree where he froze a criminal named Jackie, and when the corpse was found, his friend was babbling upon Batman's arrival about them being attacked by a monster. At a party at the Wayne Foundation's penthouse, Bruce Wayne meets Klaus Kristin and becomes suspicious of him when he notices slush on his shoes. Batman later investigated Klaus' apartment and found the diary of Katrina Kristin. Meanwhile, Snowman is committing a crime spree in Gotham City where he is stealing valuable jewels. After Bruce Wayne and Alfred Pennyworth read Katrina's diary, they learn of his birth parents. Batman then follows Klaus Kristin to Austria where he challenges him to a skiing contest in the mountains. With his skiing equipment, Batman engages Snowman until their fight takes them to an abyss. Using a marker flare, Batman temporarily blinds Snowman, causing him to fall into the abyss.

Sometime later, Bruce Wayne hears that Snowman was sighted in the Himalayas and puts on his Batman guise so that he can investigate and apprehend Snowman. Arriving in the Himalayas, Batman enlists a guide to take him up the mountain. When they find Snowman, Batman engages Snowman in battle until they fall into the river, though Snowman saves Batman before running off. Resuming their trek up the mountain, Batman and the guide find a Yeti but they escape from it unharmed. When Batman catches up to Snowman, the Yeti returns, and it is discovered that the Yeti is Snowman's father and that Snowman is dying from his half-human, half-Yeti condition. Batman allows Snowman and his father to go up the mountains so that Snowman can have his final moments of his life with his father.

== Powers and abilities ==
Snowman has control over ice and snow. He also has super-strength and expert athletic abilities.

== Other characters named Snowman ==
=== Abominable Snowman ===
The Abominable Snowman is a quasi-mystic entity of unknown origins. It spent most of its time sleeping until the rocket that contained Superman arrived on Earth. Abominable Snowman would transform into Dr. Phoenix who would go on to try to turn Superman into steel before eventually reverting and attempt to undo civilization. Superman defeated the Abominable Snowman and was able to put together a special compression device to keep the Abominable Snowman suspended a few feet on a Himalayan peak so that he would not be awoken again.

=== Blackhawks villains ===
Snowman is a snowman-themed villain who used his inventions to create bizarre snow effects to cover up the crimes committed by his gang. His illegal activities attracted the attention of the Blackhawks.

=== Blue Snowman ===
The Blue Snowman is a cross-dressing armored foe of Wonder Woman that went on to become a founding member of Villainy Inc.

== In other media ==
The Snowman appears in Justice League Adventures #12 as a member of the Cold Warriors.

== See also ==
- List of Batman Family adversaries
