= La Vendetta =

La Vendetta may refer to:

- La Vendetta (film), a 1962 French comedy film
- La Vendetta (novel), a novel by Honoré de Balzac
- La Vendetta (TV series), a Filipino drama-suspense-thriller TV series
- La Vendetta..., 2014 album by Adolescents

== See also ==
- Vendetta (disambiguation)
