= In Hot Pursuit =

DC Comics roleplaying game scenarios

Cover art by Paris Cullins, 1990

In Hot Pursuit is a collection of four scenarios published by Mayfair Games in 1990 for the superhero role-playing game DC Heroes.

== Plot summary ==
In Hot Pursuit is an anthology of four adventures designed for use with the second edition rules of DC Heroes. Each adventure is designed for the gamemaster and only one player, with a different pre-generated DC Comics superhero provided in each one. The four adventures are:

- "To Sleep, Perchance to Dream" by John Terra. Lex Luthor has revived the super-robot Amazo, and Superman must deactivate it.
- "Top Gun of Ivy Town" by Joe Pecseryicki. The Atom must take down Strobe, who has stolen a psionic battlesuit.
- "Enter the Dragons" by Douglas Franks. A member of the Red Dragons gang has kidnapped a young girl, and the Huntress must recover her safely.
- "Dopplegangers from the Past" by William Tracy. Manhunter must trail Deathstroke, who is fleeing after an attempted assassination.

== Publication history ==
Mayfair Games first published the superhero role-playing game DC Heroes in 1985 under license from DC Comics, and published a second edition in 1989. In Hot Pursuit was published the following year, a 48-page softcover book with cover art by Paris Cullins, cartography by Jerry O'Malley, and interior art by the staff of DC Comics.

== Reception ==
Gene Alloway reviewed In Hot Pursuit in White Wolf #26 (April/May, 1991), rating it a 3 out of 5 and stated that "This anthology has a good selection of adventures. Any of these would be excellent to introduce players to the game. It is interesting to note that each adventure is placed somewhere along the 'timeline' of the comic that features a particular hero, which adds to the play, especially if one is familiar with the books. If you need quick, basically fun adventures, this product is something to think about."

In the August 1991 edition of Dragon (#172), Allen Varney called this anthology of solitaire adventures a fresh idea from Mayfair Games. He noted that each adventure had a different tone, "from slam-bang, super-slugfest action (starring Superman) to light comedy (the Atom) to gritty gang warfare (the Huntress) to suspense and mistrust in a deserted villain base (Manhunter)". He concluded: "These straightforward and effective miniscenarios can fill an evening or two on their own, or an hour while you're waiting for more players to show up".
