= Wheel of Destruction =

Wheel of Destruction is a 1985 role-playing game adventure published by Mayfair Games for DC Heroes.

== Plot summary ==
Wheel of Destruction is an adventure in which the Joker has kidnapped Commissioner Gordon and forces him to participate in a game show called "Wheel of Destruction". Each night, Gordon must solve clues about the Joker's next target while Batman races to prevent its destruction. The module features a letter-guessing mechanic, multiple branching paths, and alternative playable characters like Robin, Nightwing, and Hawkman.

The scenario in Wheel of Destruction follows Batman as he attempts to rescue Commissioner Gordon from the Joker, who has trapped him in a twisted, televised game show.

== Publication history ==
Wheel of Destruction was written by Matthew J. Costello and published by Mayfair Games in 1985 as a 32-page book.

== Reception ==
Russell Grant Collins reviewed Batman Sourcebook and Wheel of Destruction for Different Worlds magazine and stated that "In conclusion, I'd have to say that I like the Batman Sourcebook, but I found a lot left to be desired in Wheel Of Destruction. Pick up the former, but skip the latter unless you're really desperate for a Batman module and are willing to do a little work before running it."

== Reviews ==
- Comics Feature #44
