= 2995: The Legion of Super-Heroes Sourcebook =

2995: The Legion of Super-Heroes Sourcebook is a 1992 role-playing supplement for DC Heroes published by Mayfair Games.

== Contents ==
2995: The Legion of Super-Heroes Sourcebook is a supplement in which the Legion of Super-Heroes and the 30th Century are detailed.

== Publication history ==
Shannon Appelcline noted that "2995: The Legion of Super-Heroes Sourcebook (1992) was an even more unique release for the RPG industry. It was written by then-authors of the Legion of Super-Heroes comic (v4: 1989-1994) and contained background information that had not yet been revealed in the comic. Though material from Star Trek and Star Wars RPG sourcebooks has occasionally influenced the licensor, this is one of the very few cases where a supplement was deliberately written to reveal information for a larger license."

== Reception ==
Gene Alloway reviewed The 2995 Legion of Super-Heroes Sourcebook in White Wolf #36 (1993), rating it a 2 out of 5 and stated that "The Legion Sourcebook is a welcome addition to the DC Heroes line of products. Keeping in mind its limitation, I do recommend it for those players wanting to expand their campaigns into the 30th century, but not for others. Be aware you will probably need the Atlas of the DC Universe as well."

== Reviews ==
- Science Fiction Age
