= Legion of Super-Heroes Volume I =

Tabletop role-playing game supplement

Legion of Super-Heroes Volume I is a 1986 role-playing game supplement for DC Heroes published by Mayfair Games.

== Plot summary ==
Legion of Super-Heroes Volume I features game statistics and background information for all the major characters of the Legion of Super-Heroes.

== Reception ==
Pete Tamlyn reviewed Legion of Super-Heroes for White Dwarf #88, and stated that "it's another monster manual: page upon page of characters out of DC Comics reduced to game statistics and a brief biography. It's fascinating for comics experts, a must for fans of the characters featured, and a big yawn for the reviewer".

Michael R. Jarrell reviewed Legion of Super-Heroes Volume I in Space Gamer/Fantasy Gamer No. 78. Jarrell commented that "I have to urge you to run out to your local game store and take a look at this fine Mayfair supplement. if you like it then buy it. Bugs and all. I don't think you'll regret it".

== Reviews ==
- Comics Feature #56
