= Mayfair Exponential Game System =

The Mayfair Exponential Game System or MEGS is a rules system developed for role-playing games. The name comes from what fans called the game system for DC Heroes, which was also later used for Underground (1993). It is noteworthy for its use of an exponential system for measuring nearly everything in the game. This system makes it possible to have both cosmically powered characters and ordinary human characters meaningfully interact within the same universe. For example, in DC Heroes, the first game to use MEGS, Superman's strength is several orders of magnitude more than Batman's. With the MEGS system, however, this large difference in strength is scaled down. So, while Superman would still have a clear advantage in a brawl, Batman is at least able to hold out for a while, mirroring how superhero combat often operates in comic books.

== History ==
MEGS was originally developed for the company Mayfair Games for the modern superhero RPG DC Heroes. The system was heavily modified for Mayfair's cyberpunk war veteran RPG Underground. The original incarnation of Pulsar Games licensed MEGS from Mayfair Games and used it in their modern superhero RPG Blood of Heroes. Blood of Heroes is very similar to DC Heroes, mostly replacing the superheroes created by DC Comics with new ones for the Blood of Heroes universe.

== Mechanics ==
All measurements in MEGS are done using a logarithmic scale. The units on this scale are called "Attribute Points" or "APs" in the superhero games and simply "Units" in Underground, with each unit on the scale represents exponentially increasing values for length, weight, time, etc. Because of the nature of logarithms and exponents, 0 APs/Units is a meaningful, positive value. Indeed, even negative APs/Units still represent positive values, though exponentially smaller, down to -100 APs, which is defined as absolute zero for all units.

In the superhero games, 1 AP corresponds to 8 seconds, 20 feet (6.1 m), 100 pounds (45 kg), 2 cubic feet (57 L), $50, or a typed page of information. A single increase of an AP roughly doubles the value, so 2 APs of weight is about 200 pounds, while 6 APs of weight is about 3200 pounds, or about 1.5 tons.

In Underground, 1 Unit corresponds to 5 seconds, 12 feet (3.7 m), 125 pounds (57 kg), 64 cubic feet (1,800 L), or a bit more than a paragraph of text. An increase of 3 Units represents a doubling of the related value, so 4 Units of weight is about 250 pounds, while 7 Units of weight is about 500 pounds.

Multiplication and division of raw values are simplified to addition and subtraction on a logarithmic scale, so the MEGS scale functions essentially the same way that slide rules do. For example, raw distance travelled is normally calculated by multiplying raw speed by raw time. In MEGS, speed and time in APs/Units are simply added together to yield the distance travelled in APs/Units. So a car traveling at a speed of 5 APs (about 55 MPH) for 9 APs of time (about 34 minutes) will travel 5+9=14 APs of distance (about 31 miles). The results of other important game events can be determined in similar ways, such as calculating the distance an object can be thrown (the PC's strength score minus the weight of the object).
