= Who's Who in the DC Universe (DC Heroes) =

Roleplaying game supplements

Who's Who in the DC Universe is a series of role-playing supplements for DC Heroes published by Mayfair Games from 1992 to 1993.

== Contents ==
Who's Who in the DC Universe is a supplement in which characters, equipment, and locations are described.

== Publication history ==
Shannon Appelcline noted that although Mayfair was closing down their other role-playing lines by 1993, "It looked like DC Heroes might continue, as it was reaching a new creative high in its final years. Swamp Thing (1991), Magic (1992) and Who's Who in the DC Universe 2 (1992) all covered new ground for the game by detailing people and places that were then gelling into DC's new Vertigo universe (1993)."

== Reception ==
Gene Alloway reviewed Who's Who in the DC Universe I, II, and III in White Wolf #37 (July/Aug., 1993), rating it a 4 out of 5 and stated that "Who's Who in the DC Universe is a worthy addition to the DC Heroes line of products. Covering virtually every object and character of any note in the DC Universe, it should provide characters and GM's with a great cast book for characters, or to at least get ideas for new characters. I highly recommend this Mayfair series to all DC Heroes and any DC Comics fan who wants a great resource."

== Reviews ==
- Papyrus (Issue 9 - 1993)
