= Cinder and Ashe =

1988 comic book mini-series

- Cover to Cinder and Ashe #1.

Publication information
- Publisher: DC Comics
- Schedule: Monthly
- Format: Limited series
- Publication date: May - August 1988
- No. of issues: 4

Creative team
- Written by: Gerry Conway
- Artist(s): José Luis García-López
- Colorist(s): Joe Orlando

Cinder and Ashe is a four issue comic book mini-series published by American company DC Comics in 1988. The series was written by Gerry Conway and drawn by José Luis García-López. The series was labelled "Suggested for Mature Readers" to indicate that its content may be inappropriate for young children.

== Plot summary ==
The story follows the two partners in a private investigation firm; Jacob Ashe is a U.S. Vietnam War veteran, while Cinder DuBois is the child of an African-American soldier and a Vietnamese woman. The series is set in New Orleans, Louisiana with flashbacks to Vietnam.

Cinder and Ashe are hired by a farmer from Iowa to find his kidnapped daughter. As the investigations unfold, flashbacks reveal how Cinder and Ashe met, and the development of their relationship. A complication in the investigation is the involvement of a man named Lacey, who had raped Cinder when she was a thirteen-year-old girl in Vietnam.
