= The Roy Rogers Show =

American Western television series (1951–1957)

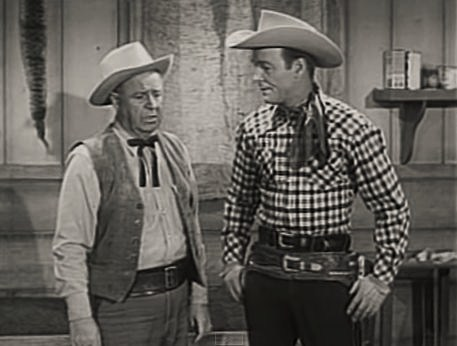
- Harry Harvey and Roy Rogers in The Roy Rogers Show
- Genre: Western
- Directed by: George Blair; John English; Leslie H. Martinson; Don McDougall; Christian Nyby; Robert G. Walker
- Starring: Roy Rogers; Dale Evans; Pat Brady; Trigger, the Golden Palomino; Bullet, the Wonder Dog
- Ending theme: "Happy Trails"
- Composers: Lou Bring; Nat Farber; Frank Worth
- Country of origin: United States
- Original language: English
- No. of seasons: 6
- No. of episodes: 100 (list of episodes)

Production
- Executive producers: Larry Kent; Jack Lacey; Roy Rogers; Arthur Rush
- Producers: Bob Henry; Jack Lacey
- Cinematography: Joe Novak
- Running time: 30 minutes
- Production company: Roy Rogers Productions

Original release
- Network: NBC
- Release: December 30, 1951 – June 9, 1957

The Roy Rogers Show is an American Western television series starring Roy Rogers. 100 episodes were broadcast on NBC for six seasons between December 30, 1951, and June 9, 1957. The episodes were set in the prevailing times (1950s) in the style of a neo-Western, rather than the Old West. Various episodes are known to be in the public domain today, being featured in low-budget cable television channels and home video.

== Overview ==
The show starred Roy Rogers as a ranch owner, Dale Evans as the proprietress of the Eureka Café and Hotel in fictional Mineral City, and Pat Brady as Roy's sidekick and Dale's cook. Brady's Jeep Nellybelle at times had a mind of her own and sped away driverless with Brady in frantic pursuit on foot. Animal stars were Roy's Palomino horse Trigger and his German Shepherd Bullet, the "Wonder Dog".

As with many Western films of the 1930s–1950s, the Roy Rogers Show featured cowboys and cowgirls riding horses and carrying six-shooters, but unlike traditional westerns, the series had a contemporary setting with automobiles, telephones, and electric lighting. No attempt was made in the scripts to explain or justify this strange amalgamation of 19th-century characters with 20th-century technology. Typical episodes followed the stars as they rescued the weak and helpless from the clutches of dishonest lawmen, con artists, bank robbers, claim jumpers, rustlers, and other "bad guys".

In addition to traditional Western plot themes such as cattle rustling and bank robberies, the program featured more contemporary topics, including gun safety and conservation of natural resources. "Many of the shows expressed a moral, and several preached a Christian message."

== Episodes ==
Season	Episodes	Originally released	
Season	Episodes	First released	Last released
1	23	December 30, 1951	June 15, 1952
2	15	September 7, 1952	June 28, 1953
3	14	October 11, 1953	March 14, 1954
4	18	September 12, 1954	May 22, 1955
5	15	October 9, 1955	March 24, 1956
6	15	October 21, 1956	June 9, 1957

== Production ==
Interior shots for the show were filmed at the Samuel Goldwyn Studio, with much of the outdoor action footage filmed on the Iverson Movie Ranch in Chatsworth, Los Angeles, California The program was originally sponsored by General Foods (Post Cereals and Jell-O). The show's theme song, "Happy Trails", was written by Dale Evans and sung by her and Rogers over the end credits of each episode.

The show received an Emmy nomination in 1955 for Best Western or Adventure Series, but it lost out to the syndicated Stories of the Century, an anthology series starring and narrated by Jim Davis. The series finished #27 in the Nielsen ratings for the 1951–1952 season and #30 for 1954–1955.

== Related merchandise ==
The show was merchandised for the youth market with comic books, playsets, cowboy and cowgirl costumes, toy pistols, longbows, and many other items. In 1957, 2 million copies of each comic book were sold. A related comic strip was syndicated to 186 newspapers.

== Reruns ==
From January 1961 until September 1964, CBS broadcast reruns of The Roy Rogers Show on Saturday mornings. As of 2019, episodes have been seen on Retro Television Network, World Harvest Television and The Cowboy Channel.
