= World in the Balance =

World in the Balance is a 1992 role-playing adventure for DC Heroes published by Mayfair Games.

== Plot summary ==
World in the Balance is an adventure in which two groups of player characters run through a double adventure simultaneously.

== Reception ==
Gene Alloway reviewed World in the Balance Double Adventure in White Wolf #34 (Jan./Feb., 1993), rating it a 3 out of 5 and stated that "Overall, it is the writing, the fun, and the management aids of this adventure that won me over. The importance of the adventure, its various locales, and the idea of two groups working on the same problem are all engaging and well done."
