= José Luis García-López =

Spanish comic book artist (born 1948)

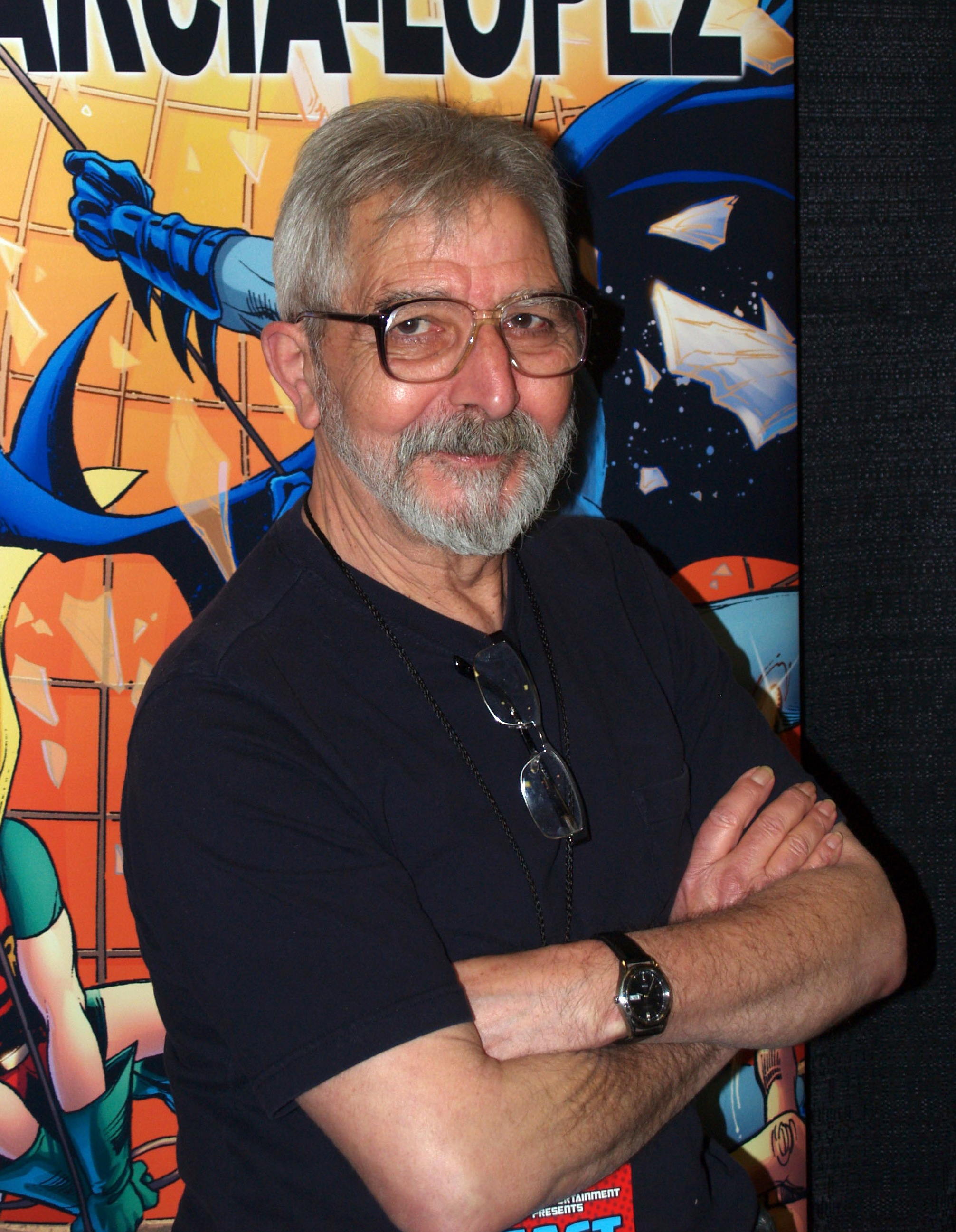
- García-López in April 2016
- Born: José Luis García-López; March 26, 1948 (age 78) Lalín, Spain
- Areas: Penciller, Inker
- Notable works: Batman vs. the Incredible Hulk; Cinder and Ashe; Deadman; Jonah Hex; New Teen Titans; Superman

José Luis García-López (born March 26, 1948) is a Spanish-Argentine comics artist who works in the United States, particularly in a long-running relationship with DC Comics. In addition to his storytelling art, he produced the official reference art for characters in the DC Comics Style Guide, as used in licensed merchandise.

== Early life ==
José Luis García-López was born on March 26, 1948 in Lalín, Province of Pontevedra, Spain, and lived since age three in Argentina. He was inspired by artists as Alex Raymond, Harold Foster, Milton Caniff, José Luis Salinas, and Alberto Breccia.

== Career ==
During the 1960s, García-López worked for Charlton Comics. In 1974, he moved to New York, where he met DC Comics editor Joe Orlando. His first interior art credit for DC was June 1975's "Nightmare In Gold" back-up in Action Comics #448, where he inked the pencils of artist Dick Dillin. The following month, he inked the pencils of Curt Swan on a "Private Life of Clark Kent" backup story in Superman #289, before graduating to full pencils on a back-up story written by E. Nelson Bridwell in Detective Comics #452 (October 1975).

The following month, García-López and writer Gerry Conway created the Hercules Unbound series and in April 1977, he and writer Michael Fleisher launched the Jonah Hex ongoing series. García-López and Conway collaborated on a Superman vs. Wonder Woman story in All-New Collectors' Edition #C-54 (1978). DC Comics Presents, a team-up title starring Superman was launched in 1978 by writer Martin Pasko and García-López. He drew the first appearance of Snowman in Batman #337 (July 1981) and a DC–Marvel crossover between Batman and the Hulk in DC Special Series #27 (Fall 1981). He penciled five issues of The New Teen Titans in 1985 and writer Marv Wolfman later commented that "I knew that I had this incredible artist who could draw almost anything that I wanted...So I decided to make the story just the biggest spectacle I could come up with."

In 1984, García-López began drawing his first regular ongoing monthly series, Atari Force.

Other works by García-López include Road to Perdition, Deadman, and various DC superheroes. His work on the DC series Twilight received an Eisner Award nomination. His work on the Cinder and Ashe limited series was praised by ComicsAlliance in 2014 which noted "His characters are never in a static position; they’re always stretching, or crunched up, or twisting. There is constant dramatic content in their movements."

During his exclusive contract with DC Comics, he has been responsible for penciling the style guides used by the company to provide official artwork for merchandise licences around the world. García-López illustrated the 1982 guide, still used today as part of a DC Comics retro line, a 1992 guide focused on Batman Returns, the Superman related guides from 1991, 1994, and 2006, and other DC Universe guides in 1998, 2004, and 2012. The 1982 guide was reprinted for the general public in 2024 by Standards Manual.

His 2000s work includes JLA: Classified and a 2009 story arc in Batman Confidential which introduced the King Tut character. He drew the Metal Men story in Wednesday Comics which was written by Dan DiDio. In 2011, he drew one of the stories in The Spirit #17. DC Comics published a collection of his Superman stories in Adventure of Superman: José Luis García-López in 2013. He and Len Wein produced a comics adaptation of a Two-Face story that was written by Harlan Ellison and originally intended for the Batman television series. García-López drew the "Actionland!" chapter in Action Comics #1000 (June 2018) and the Superman story in DC Nation #0 (July 2018).

== Bibliography ==
Interior pencil art (except where noted) includes:

=== DC Comics ===
- Action Comics (The Atom): #448 (inks over Dick Dillin pencils); (Superman): #451 (inks over Curt Swan) (1975), #1000 (2018); (Phantom Stranger): #623, 641 (1989)
- Adventure Comics (Vigilante): #442; (Deadman): #462–463, 465–466 (1975–79)
- All-New Collectors' Edition (Superman vs. Wonder Woman) #C–54 (1978)
- All-Star Western, vol. 3 #10, 30–31 (2012–14)
- Atari Force, vol. 2, #1–12 (1984) (note: inks only on issues #4 and #5)
- Batman #272, 336–337, 353 (1976–82)
- Batman Confidential #26–28 (2009)
- Batman Family (Robin and Batgirl team-up) #3 (1976)
- Batman: Gotham Knights (Batman Black and White) #10 (2000)
- Batman: Legends of the Dark Knight #16–20, 149–153 (1991–2002)
- Batman: Reign of Terror graphic novel (1999)
- Batman Returns: The Official Comic Adaptation #1 (1992)
- Batman '66 the Lost Episode #1 (2015)
- Batman: The Blue, the Grey, and the Bat #1 (1993)
- The Brave and the Bold #164, 171 (1980–81)
- Cinder and Ashe miniseries #1–4 (1988)
- DC Comics Presents #1–4, 17, 20, 24, 31, 41 (1978–82)
- DC Graphic Novel (Star Raiders) #1 (1983)
- DC Nation #0 (2018)
- DC Special: The Return of Donna Troy miniseries #1–4 (2005)
- DC Special Series (Kid Flash) #11; (Legion of Super-Heroes) #21; (Batman vs. the Incredible Hulk) #27 (1978–81)
- DC Universe: Legacies limited series #3–4 (2010)
- Deadman miniseries #1–4 (1986)
- Deadman miniseries #5–6 (2002)
- Detective Comics (Batman): #449, 454, 458–459; (Hawkman): #452, 454–455; (Elongated Man): #500 (1975–81)
- Dr. Strangefate one-shot (Amalgam Comics) (1996)
- Green Lantern Annual #3 (1987)
- Hawkman, vol. 4, #18 (2003)
- Hercules Unbound #1–6 (1975–76)
- Heroes Against Hunger (two pages, among other artists) (1986)
- House of Secrets (Abel) #154 (1978)
- JLA: Classified #16–21 (2006)
- The Joker #2–4 (1975)
- The Joker 80th Anniversary 100-Page Super Spectacular #1 (2020)
- Jonah Hex #1–4, 10, 32, 73 (1977–83)
- Just Imagine Stan Lee creating Green Lantern (backup story) (2001)
- The Kamandi Challenge, limited series, #12 (backup story) (2017)
- Legion of Super-Heroes, vol. 3, #55 (among other artists) (1988)
- Many Worlds of Tesla Strong one-shot (among other artists) (2003)
- New Teen Titans, vol. 2, #7–11 (1985)
- On the Road to Perdition, miniseries, #1–3 (2003)
- Realworlds: Superman, one-shot (2000)
- Robin Annual #2 (1993)
- Secret Origins, vol. 2, (Phantom Stranger) #10 (1987)
- Sensation Comics Featuring Wonder Woman (digital) #40 (2015)
- Showcase '94 (New Gods) #1 (1994)
- The Spirit, vol. 2, #17 (2011)
- Superman (Superman): #289, 294, 301–302, 307–309, 347; (Mr. Mxyzptlk): #351 (1976–80)
- Superman, vol. 2, #104–105 (1995)
- Superman, Inc (Elseworlds) (1999)
- Superman: Kal (Elseworlds) (1995)
- Tarzan #250–255 (1976)
- Twilight miniseries #1–3 (1990)
- Wednesday Comics (Metal Men) #1–12 (2009)
- Weird War Tales #41, 44, 108 (1975–82)
- Weird Western Tales (Jonah Hex) #32–33, 38 (1976–77)
- Wonder Woman Annual #1 (among other artists) (1988)
- Wonder Woman 80th Anniversary 100-Page Super Spectacular #1 (2021)
- World's Finest Comics (Superman and Batman) #244, 255, 258 (1977–79)

=== Other publishers ===
- Boris Karloff Tales of Mystery #64–65 (Gold Key, 1975)
- Career Girl Romances #71 (Charlton, 1972)
- Ghostly Tales #77, 79, 146 (Charlton, 1969–70, 1980)
- Grimm's Ghost Stories #24–25 (Gold Key, 1975)
- Just Married #68–69, 71–74 (Charlton, 1969–70)
- Nexus #30 (First, 1987)
- Official Handbook of the Marvel Universe: Deluxe Edition #15 (Wonder Man entry) (Marvel, 1987)

=== Compilations ===
- Adventures of Superman: José Luis García-López, collects Superman #294, 301, 302, 307-309, 347; DC Comics Presents #1-4, 17, 20, 24, 31; and All-New Collectors' Edition C-54 ("Superman vs. Wonder Woman"), 360 pages, April 2013, ISBN 978-1401238568
- Adventures of Superman: José Luis García-López Vol. 2, collects Action Comics #1000, DC Comics Presents #41, Realworlds: Superman #1, Superman #351, Superman vol. 2 #104-105, Superman, Inc. #1, Superman: Kal #1, and World's Finest Comics #244, #255, and #258, 384 pages, February 2020, ISBN 978-1779501028
- Legends of the Dark Knight: José Luis García-López, collects Batman #272, #336-337, and 353, Batman '66: The Lost Episode #1, Batman Confidential #26-28, Batman Family #3, Batman: Gotham Knights #10, Batman: Reign of Terror #1, The Brave and the Bold #164 and #171, DC Comics Presents #31 and #41, Detective Comics #454 and #458-459, The Joker #4, and World's Finest Comics #244, #255, and #258. Includes covers only from Batman #311, #313-314, #318, and #321, Batman: Dark Knight of the Round Table #1-2, Best of the Brave and the Bold #1-6, DC Special Series #21, Detective Comics #483 and #487, and The Untold Legend of the Batman #1-3, 472 pages, April 2023, ISBN 978-1779521699
- On the Road to Perdition (with Max Allan Collins, 296 pages, Paradox Press, December 2004, ISBN 1-4012-0357-4; Titan Books, May 2005, ISBN 1-84576-023-9, collects:
  - Book 1: Oasis (with inks by Josef Rubinstein, 96 pages, Paradox Press, May 2003, ISBN 1-4012-0068-0; Titan Books, June 2003, ISBN 1-84023-689-2)
  - Book 2: Sanctuary (with inks by Steve Lieber, 96 pages, Paradox Press, December 2003, ISBN 1-4012-0173-3; Titan Books, March 2004, ISBN 1-84023-796-1)
  - Book 3: Detour (with inks by Steve Lieber, 96 pages, Paradox Press, July 2004, ISBN 1-4012-0174-1; Titan Books, October 2004, ISBN 1-84023-942-5)

== Awards ==
1992: Nominated for "Best Artist" Eisner Award, for Twilight.
1997: Nominated for "Best Penciller/Inker or Penciller/Inker Team" Eisner Award, with Kevin Nowlan, for Doctor Strangefate

Preceded by n/a	Jonah Hex penciller 1977	Succeeded by Ernie Chan
Preceded by n/a	DC Comics Presents penciller 1978	Succeeded by Murphy Anderson
Preceded by Terry Austin	Batman: Legends of the Dark Knight inker 1991	Succeeded by Randy Elliott
Preceded by Barry Kitson	Batman: Legends of the Dark Knight inker 2002	Succeeded by Bill Reinhold
