= Four Horsemen of Apokolips =

Adventure for DC Heroes

Four Horsemen of Apokolips is a 1986 role-playing game adventure published by Mayfair Games for DC Heroes.

== Plot summary ==
Four Horsemen of Apokolips is an adventure in which the player characters are pitted against Darkseid's avatars of War, Famine, Pestilence, and Death, who wreak havoc across the globe. Players must rescue world leaders, prevent global catastrophe, and defeat each Horseman in separate encounters. Darkseid himself possesses Continuum Control, allowing him to manipulate reality, resurrect characters, and wield devastating powers. If confronted, he punishes heroes dramatically, only to restore them afterward with a warning.

Four Horsemen of Apokolips is an adventure scenario which pits the player characters (with 2000–4000 Hero Points) against Darkseid, who transforms four corrupt humans into embodiments of War, Famine, Pestilence, and Death, unleashing global chaos that could lead to World War III. The module includes extended Action and Results tables, scaling challenges to cosmic-level gameplay (120 APs).

== Publication history ==
Four Horsemen of Apokolips was written by Troy Denning and published by Mayfair Games in 1986 as 40-page book.

== Reception ==
Thomas A. Grant reviewed Four Horsemen of Apokolips for Different Worlds magazine and stated that "As role-playing goes [...] Four Horsemen of Apokolips has little to offer. There's not much opportunity for the heroes to do a great deal more than rush off to nip the latest global crisis in the bud."

== Reviews ==
- Comics Feature #52
