= Project Prometheus (DC Heroes) =

Project Prometheus is a 1985 role-playing game adventure published by Mayfair Games for DC Heroes.

== Plot summary ==
Project Prometheus is an adventure in which King Minos and his Cretan supervillains seek to restore the ancient Minoan Empire.

== Publication history ==
Project Prometheus was written by Greg Gorden and Lee Maniloff and published by Mayfair Games in 1985 as a 32-page book.

== Reviews ==
- Comics Feature #44
