= Vendetta =

Vendetta may refer to:

- Feud or vendetta, a long-running argument or fight

== Film ==
- Vendetta (1919 film), a film featuring Harry Liedtke
- Vendetta (1950 film), an American drama produced by Howard Hughes
- Vendetta (1986 film), an American action film
- Vendetta (1995 film), a Swedish film
- Vendetta (1996 film), a film featuring Richard Lynch
- Vendetta (1999 film), an HBO crime drama
- Vendetta (2013 film), a British film
- Vendetta (2015 film), an American film
- Vendetta (2017 film), an American pornographic film
- Vendetta (2022 film), an action thriller starring Bruce Willis

== Literature ==
- La Vendetta (novel), a novel by Honoré de Balzac
- Vendetta (Dibdin novel), by Michael Dibdin
- Vendetta (Star Trek), a novel by Peter David
- Vendetta: Lucky's Revenge, a novel by Jackie Collins
- Vendetta, a novel by Derek Lambert
- Vendetta!, an 1886 novel by Marie Corelli
- "A Vendetta", an 1883 short story by Guy de Maupassant

== Music ==
- Vendetta Records, a record label

=== Bands ===
- Vendetta (German band), a metal group

=== Albums ===
- Vendetta (Mic Geronimo album)
- Vendetta: First Round, an EP by Ivy Queen
- Vendetta (Ivy Queen album)
- Vendetta (Throwdown album)
- Vendetta (Zemfira album)

=== Songs ===
- "Vendetta", a song by Slipknot from All Hope Is Gone
- "Vendetta", a song by Andy Mineo from Uncomfortable
- "Vendetta", a song by Dark Angel from We Have Arrived

== Television ==
- Vendetta (British TV series), a 1966–1968 BBC series starring Neil McCallum and Stelio Candelli
- Vendetta (TV series), a 2016 Armenian romantic drama television series
- "Vendetta" (Agents of S.H.I.E.L.D.: Slingshot), a 2016 episode
- "Vendetta" (Arrow), a 2012 episode
- "Vendetta" (Batman: The Animated Series), a 1992 episode
- "The Vendetta" (Dynasty), a 1986 episode
- Vendetta (Making Fiends), a fictional character
- "Vendetta" (Scott & Bailey), a 2011 episode
- "Vendetta" (Warehouse 13), a 2010 episode

== Video games ==
- Vendetta (1989 video game), a video game by System 3
- Vendetta (1991 video game), an arcade game by Konami
- Vendetta Online, a 2004 science fiction MMORPG
- Vendetta, a mission in Call of Duty: World at War.
- Vendetta (Overwatch), a character in Overwatch 2

== Other uses ==
- HMAS Vendetta, a list of ships of the Royal Australian Navy
- Vendetta, a perfume by Valentino
- Vendetta, a guitar by Dean Guitars

== People with the surname ==
- David Vendetta (born 1968), French DJ

== See also ==
- Def Jam Vendetta, a 2003 fighting game by Electronic Arts
- La Vendetta (disambiguation)
- V for Vendetta (disambiguation)
