= The Feud (1910 film) =

- Directed by: Sidney Olcott
- Produced by: Sidney Olcott
- Production company: Kalem Company
- Distributed by: General Film Company
- Release date: April 13, 1910
- Running time: 925 ft
- Country: United States
- Languages: Silent film (English intertitles)

The Feud is a 1910 American silent film produced by Kalem Company and directed by Sidney Olcott.

== Production notes ==
The film was shot in Jacksonville, Florida.
