= Family Feud (disambiguation) =

Family Feud is an American television game show.

Family Feud may also refer to:

== Television shows ==
- International versions of Family Feud, based on the American show
- "Family Feud", an episode of the American sitcom Mama's Family

== Music ==
- Family Feud (album), by The Dayton Family
- "Family Feud" (song), a song by Jay-Z featuring Beyoncé from 4:44
- "Family Feud", a song by Lil Wayne featuring Drake from Dedication 6: Reloaded

== See also ==
- Feud
