= Siege Perilous (disambiguation) =

In Arthurian legend, the Siege Perilous, otherwise known as "The Seat Perilous", is the seat at the Round Table reserved for the knight who would quest for and return the Holy Grail.

Siege Perilous may also refer to:

- Siege Perilous (comics), a device appearing in books published by Marvel Comics
- Siége Perilous, an album by the American power metal band Kamelot
- "Siege Perilous" (Once Upon a Time), an episode from the fifth season of the TV series Once Upon a Time
