= Magic (DC Heroes) =

Magic is a 1992 role-playing supplement for DC Heroes published by Mayfair Games.

== Contents ==
Magic is a supplement in which the history of magic is detailed as well as new magic rules and information about magical characters and places.

== Publication history ==
Shannon Appelcline noted that although Mayfair was closing down their other role-playing lines by 1993, "It looked like DC Heroes might continue, as it was reaching a new creative high in its final years. Swamp Thing (1991), Magic (1992) and Who's Who in the DC Universe 2 (1992) all covered new ground for the game by detailing people and places that were then gelling into DC's new Vertigo universe (1993)."

== Reception ==
Gene Alloway reviewed The DC Heroes Magic Sourcebook in White Wolf #36 (1993), rating it a 4 out of 5 and stated that "The DC Heroes Magic Sourcebook is the best thing I have seen since Mayfair's World at War last year. It provides gamers with a whole new dimension to their role-playing, and introduces us to some of the hottest characters in the DC Universe. I recommend it for DC Heroes players and people who just like the mystical characters of the DC Universe."

== Reviews ==
- The Scroll (Issue 10 - Sep 1992)
