= Blood of Heroes (role-playing game) =

Blood of Heroes Role-Playing Game
- Special edition cover
- Publishers: Pulsar Games
- Genres: Superhero
- Systems: Mayfair Exponential Game System

Blood of Heroes is a superhero role-playing game published by Pulsar Games. It was a successor to DC Heroes and used that game's Mayfair Exponential Game System, or MEGS. Blood of Heroes is set in its own fictional world, rather than the DC universe.

== Game mechanics ==
The system features a comparative style of mechanics in which Acting Attributes are compared to Opposing Attributes on one chart, then Effect Attributes are compared to Resistance Attributes on a linked chart. It is a point-based system starting with a base of 450 Hero Points to create a character, which allows the player to design a character typical to sidekick power levels. In the system there is the option to increase this amount by 450 point amounts to make more powerful characters. Unlike the DC Heroes game, this increase does not also increase the costs of Advantages and Drawbacks.

== Setting ==
The actual world included with the game is a 1990s style superhero world with a heavy influence of occult and magical beings, which accounts for the much more detailed magic system included in the game.

== Publication history ==
After Mayfair Games stopped publishing DC Heroes, the rights to the game's mechanics were licensed to the new company Pulsar Games, who had been seeking to acquire the rights since before Mayfair went out of business. Pulsar published the superhero role-playing game Blood of Heroes (1998), which was very close to the third edition of DC Heroes without using any of the DC characters. The original Blood of Heroes was criticized for using poor artwork. A second edition, titled "Blood of Heroes: Special Edition" (pictured above) was printed in 2000 and featured expanded rules and new artwork, including cover art by Dave Dorman. Pulsar Games went out of business in 2003.

In 2004 Pulsar Games was sold to new owners. Since then, nothing has been done official with the game, leaving it inactive.
