= List of The Roy Rogers Show episodes =

This is an episode list for the TV series The Roy Rogers Show.

== Series overview ==
Season	Episodes	Originally released	
Season	Episodes	First released	Last released
1	23	December 30, 1951	June 15, 1952
2	15	September 7, 1952	June 28, 1953
3	14	October 11, 1953	March 14, 1954
4	18	September 12, 1954	May 22, 1955
5	15	October 9, 1955	March 24, 1956
6	15	October 21, 1956	June 9, 1957

== Episodes ==
=== Season 1 (1951–52) ===
No. overall	No. in season	Title	Directed by	Written by	Original release date
1	1	"Jailbreak"	John English	Albert DeMond & Ray Wilson	December 30, 1951
2	2	"Doc Stevens' Travelling Store"	Robert G. Walker	Albert DeMond & Ray Wilson	January 6, 1952
3	3	"The Set-Up"	Robert G. Walker	Eric Taylor	January 20, 1952
4	4	"The Treasure of Howling Dog Canyon"	Robert G. Walker	Albert DeMond & Ray Wilson	January 27, 1952
5	5	"The Train Robbery"	Robert G. Walker	Milton Raison	February 3, 1952
6	6	"Badman's Brother"	Robert G. Walker	Dwight V. Babcock	February 10, 1952
7	7	"The Outlaw's Girl"	Robert G. Walker	Dwight V. Babcock	February 17, 1952
8	8	"The Desert Fugitive"	John English	Albert DeMond & Ray Wilson	February 24, 1952
9	9	"Outlaw's Town"	Robert G. Walker	Milton Raison	March 2, 1952
10	10	"Unwilling Outlaw"	Robert G. Walker	Virginia M. Cooke	March 9, 1952
11	11	"Dead Men's Hills"	Robert G. Walker	Dwight Cummins	March 16, 1952
12	12	"The Minister's Son"	John English	Albert DeMond & Ray Wilson	March 23, 1952
13	13	"Ghost Gulch"	Robert G. Walker	Virginia M. Cooke	March 30, 1952
14	14	"Ride in the Death Wagon"	Robert G. Walker	Ray Wilson	April 6, 1952
15	15	"Peril from the Past"	Robert G. Walker	Dwight V. Babcock	April 13, 1952
16	16	"Ride of the Ranchers"	Robert G. Walker	Milton Raison	April 20, 1952
17	17	"Shoot to Kill"	Robert G. Walker	Dwight Cummins	April 27, 1952
18	18	"The Hermit's Secret"	Robert G. Walker	Dwight V. Babcock	May 4, 1952
19	19	"Haunted Mine of Paradise Valley"	Robert G. Walker	Milton Raison	May 18, 1952
20	20	"Ghost Town Gold"	Robert G. Walker	Dwight V. Babcock	May 25, 1952
21	21	"Doublecrosser"	Robert G. Walker	Albert DeMond & Ray Wilson	June 1, 1952
22	22	"Carnival Killer"	Robert G. Walker	Milton Raison	June 8, 1952
23	23	"Flying Bullets"	Robert G. Walker	Dwight Cummins	June 15, 1952

=== Season 2 (1952–53) ===
No. overall	No. in season	Title	Directed by	Written by	Original release date
24	1	"Death Medicine"	Robert G. Walker	Ray Wilson	September 7, 1952
25	2	"Outlaw's Return"	Robert G. Walker	Dwight Cummins	September 28, 1952
26	3	"Hunting for Trouble"	Robert G. Walker	Dwight Cummins	October 5, 1952
27	4	"The Feud"	Robert G. Walker	Dwight Cummins	October 12, 1952
28	5	"Go for Your Gun"	Robert G. Walker	Dwight Cummins	November 23, 1952
29	6	"Mayor of Ghost Town"	Robert G. Walker	Milton Raison	November 30, 1952
30	7	"Blind Justice"	Robert G. Walker	William Lively	December 14, 1952
31	8	"The Knockout"	Robert G. Walker	Dwight Cummins	December 28, 1952
32	9	"The Run-A-Round"	Robert G. Walker	Dwight Cummins	February 22, 1953
33	10	"Phantom Rustlers"	Robert G. Walker	Dwight V. Babcock	May 4, 1953
34	11	"Loaded Guns"	Robert G. Walker, Christian Nyby (uncredited)	Milton Raison	April 12, 1953
35	12	"The Silver Fox Hunt"	Robert G. Walker	Milton Raison	April 19, 1953
36	13	"The Mingo Kid"	Robert G. Walker	William Lively	April 26, 1953
37	14	"The Long Chance"	Robert G. Walker	Dwight Cummins	May 3, 1953
38	15	"Money to Burn"	Robert G. Walker	Dwight Cummins	June 28, 1953

=== Season 3 (1953–54) ===
No. overall	No. in season	Title	Directed by	Written by	Original release date
39	1	"The Milliner from Medicine Creek"	Robert G. Walker	Milton Raison	October 11, 1953
40	2	"Pat's Inheritance"	Leslie H. Martinson	Milton Raison	November 1, 1953
41	3	"Outlaw of Paradise Valley"	Leslie H. Martinson	Milton Raison	November 8, 1953
42	4	"Bullets and a Burro"	John English	Albert DeMond & Ray Wilson	November 15, 1953
43	5	"Gun Trouble"	Robert G. Walker	Dwight Cummins	November 22, 1953
44	6	"M Stands for Murder"	Robert G. Walker	Dwight Cummins	December 6, 1953
45	7	"The Peddler from the Pecos"	Leslie H. Martinson	Milton Raison	December 13, 1953
46	8	"Bad Company"	Leslie H. Martinson	Dwight Cummins	December 27, 1953
47	9	"Little Dynamite"	Leslie H. Martinson	Dwight Cummins	January 10, 1954
48	10	"The Kid from Silver City"	Leslie H. Martinson	Milton Raison	January 17, 1954
49	11	"The Secret of Indian Gap"	Leslie H. Martinson	Milton Raison	January 24, 1954
50	12	"The Deputy Sheriff"	Leslie H. Martinson	Milton Raison	February 7, 1954
51	13	"The High-Graders of Paradise Valley"	Leslie H. Martinson	Milton Raison	February 28, 1954
52	14	"Land Swindle"	Robert G. Walker	Milton Raison	March 14, 1954

=== Season 4 (1954–55) ===
No. overall	No. in season	Title	Directed by	Written by	Original release date
53	1	"The Lady Killer"	Leslie H. Martinson	Jim Diehl	September 12, 1954
54	2	"The Young Defenders"	Don McDougall	Milton Raison	October 3, 1954
55	3	"Backfire"	Don McDougall	Dwight Cummins	October 10, 1954
56	4	"Last of the Larabee Kid"	Don McDougall	Milton Raison	October 17, 1954
57	5	"The Hijackers"	Robert G. Walker	William Lively	October 24, 1954
58	6	"Hard Luck Story"	Don McDougall	Dwight Cummins	October 31, 1954
59	7	"Boys' Day in Paradise Valley"	Don McDougall	Milton Raison	November 7, 1954
60	8	"Bad Neighbors"	Don McDougall	Dwight Cummins	November 21, 1954
61	9	"Strangers"	Don McDougall	Dwight Cummins	December 5, 1954
62	10	"Hidden Treasures"	Don McDougall	Dwight Cummins	December 19, 1954
63	11	"Outcasts of Paradise Island"	Don McDougall	Milton Raison	January 9, 1955
64	12	"The Big Chance"	Don McDougall	Dwight Cummins	January 23, 1955
65	13	"Uncle Steve's Finish"	Don McDougall	Milton Raison	February 3, 1955
66	14	"Dead End Trail"	Don McDougall	Dwight Cummins	February 20, 1955
67	15	"Born Fugitive"	Don McDougall	William Lively	February 27, 1955
68	16	"Quick Draw"	Don McDougall	Milton Raison	March 20, 1955
69	17	"The Ginger Horse"	Don McDougall	Dwight Cummins	March 27, 1955
70	18	"The Showdown"	Don McDougall	David Nowinson & Karl Schichter	May 22, 1955

=== Season 5 (1955–56) ===
No. overall	No. in season	Title	Directed by	Written by	Original release date
71	1	"And Sudden Death"	Don McDougall	Dwight Cummins	October 9, 1955
72	2	"Ranch War"	Don McDougall	Milton Raison	October 23, 1955
73	3	"Violence in Paradise Valley"	Robert G. Walker	Ray Wilson	November 2, 1955
74	4	"The Brothers O'Dell"	George Blair	Milton Raison	November 20, 1955
75	5	"The Scavenger"	Don McDougall	William Lively	November 27, 1955
76	6	"Treasure of Paradise Valley"	Unknown	Unknown	December 11, 1955
77	7	"Three Masked Men"	George Blair	Dwight Cummins	December 18, 1955
78	8	"Ambush"	George Blair	Dwight Cummins	January 15, 1956
79	9	"Money Is Dangerous"	George Blair	Dwight Cummins	January 29, 1956
80	10	"False Faces"	Unknown	Unknown	February 5, 1956
81	11	"Horse Crazy"	George Blair	Dwight Cummins	February 26, 1956
82	12	"Smoking Guns"	George Blair	Milton Raison	March 3, 1956
83	13	"Empty Saddles"	Christian Nyby	Dwight Cummins & Howard J. Green	March 10, 1956
84	14	"Sheriff Missing"	George Blair	William Lively	March 17, 1956
85	15	"The Horse Mixup"	George Blair	Polly James	March 24, 1956

=== Season 6 (1956–57) ===
No. overall	No. in season	Title	Directed by	Written by	Original release date
86	1	"Head for Cover"	Unknown	Unknown	October 21, 1956
87	2	"Fishing for Fingerprints"	Christian Nyby	Ellis Marcus	October 28, 1956
88	3	"Mountain Pirates"	Unknown	Unknown	November 4, 1956
89	4	"His Weight in Wildcats"	Unknown	Unknown	November 11, 1956
90	5	"Paleface Justice"	Unknown	Unknown	November 18, 1956
91	6	"Tossup"	Unknown	Unknown	December 2, 1956
92	7	"Fighting Sire"	Unknown	Unknown	December 16, 1956
93	8	"Deadlock at Dark Canyon"	Unknown	Unknown	January 6, 1957
94	9	"End of the Trail"	Unknown	Unknown	January 27, 1957
95	10	"Junior Outlaw"	Don McDougall	Polly James	February 10, 1957
96	11	"High Stakes with Ed Hinton"	Unknown	Unknown	February 24, 1957
97	12	"Accessory to Crime"	Unknown	Unknown	March 3, 1957
98	13	"Portrait of Murder"	Unknown	Unknown	March 17, 1957
99	14	"Brady's Bonanza"	Unknown	Unknown	March 31, 1957
100	15	"Johnny Rover"	George Blair	William Lively	June 9, 1957
