= Feudal (disambiguation) =

Feudal can refer to:

- Feudalism
- Feudal, Saskatchewan, a village in Saskatchewan, Canada
- Feudal (game), boardgame by Avalon Hill/Hasbro
- Corporation (feudal Europe)
- Feudal baron and prescriptive barony
- Demesne (feudal domain)
- History of Japan#Feudal Japan
- Feudal land tenure
