= Pulsar Games =

Tabletop role-playing game company

Pulsar Games was a game company that produced role-playing games and game supplements.

== History ==
Pulsar Games was a new game company that licensed the rights to the game mechanics of DC Heroes after Mayfair Games stopped publishing the game, and had been trying to secure the rights since before the original Mayfair went defunct. Pulsar published the super-hero game Blood of Heroes (1998) using these rights to the game mechanics. Pulsar Games closed operations in 2003. Pulsar Games was later resurrected by another group of people that did not publish any new products, and their website was eventually taken down.
