= Atari Force =

Comic book series

- Cover art for Atari Force #1. Art by Ross Andru and Dick Giordano.

Publication information
- Publisher: DC Comics
- First appearance: Atari Force #1 (1982)
- Created by: Gerry Conway and Roy Thomas

In-story information
- Base(s): Scanner One

Atari Force is the name of two comic book series published by DC Comics from 1982 to 1986. Both were loosely based on video games and trademarks owned by Atari, Inc.

== Publication history ==
The first Atari Force title was a series of minicomics created in 1982 to be packed in with certain Atari 2600 video game titles from fellow Warner Communications subsidiary Atari, Inc. The five games which included the comics were Defender, Berzerk, Star Raiders, Phoenix, and Galaxian. The comics were written by Gerry Conway and Roy Thomas with artists Ross Andru, Gil Kane, Dick Giordano, and Mike DeCarlo.

An Atari Force special insert appeared in two comic books cover dated January 1983 and served as a prequel to the ongoing series launched a year later. The insert was the story previously published in the Phoenix minicomic, but the story title was changed to "Code Name: Liberator" and the featured ship's name became Liberator. In addition, the art for the aliens showed them as more frog-like. Atari released a Liberator arcade game featuring Commander Martin Champion and the Atari Force name.

In 1983, DC Comics published a graphic novel based on Star Raiders that tied into the mini-comics. It was the first title of the DC Graphic Novel series. It was written by Elliot S! Maggin and illustrated by José Luis García-López in his first ongoing monthly series. The graphic novel was a larger format than normal comic books, and reached a larger market (via comic book specialty stores) than the small subset of customers who bought the 2600 cartridge.

The second series (Jan. 1984 - Aug. 1985) was released monthly, in conventional comic-book format, and lasted for 20 issues. Gerry Conway returned as writer while José Luis García-López became the main pencil artist. However, original series concept artist Ross Andru illustrated issues #4–5. In issue #13, Eduardo Barreto took over as penciler and, in #14, Mike Baron became the regular writer through the final issue. Issues #12-20 also featured backup stories by different writers and artists. In 1986, a "Special" issue was released with work by different creators, some of whom had done backup stories for volume 2. The backup story of issue #20, "Hukka vs. the Bob!" by Keith Giffen, Robert Loren Fleming, and Karl Kesel, was reprinted in April 1986 in the Best of DC #71 digest, containing the Year's Best Comics Stories, and was voted as one of the best comic book stories of the year in Comics Buyers Guide magazine, among others.

In 2015, Dynamite Entertainment announced plans to reprint the original comic book and release new comics based on Atari properties: Asteroids, Centipede, Crystal Castles, Missile Command, Tempest, and Yars' Revenge. The reprinted Atari Force comics were solicited in 2017, but never materialized.

== Fictional biography ==
The original Atari Force was a team of humans from different nations using the multi-dimensional starship Scanner One to search for a new planet for humanity to inhabit as the Earth was facing ecological devastation. The team was handpicked by A.T.A.R.I. (Advanced Technology and Research Institute), and consisted of Martin Champion as mission commander, Lydia Perez as pilot and executive officer, Li-San O'Rourke as security officer, Mohandas Singh as flight engineer, and Dr. Lucas Orion as medical officer. A semi-sentient alien creature, named Hukka because of the noise he made, later joined as team mascot.

The second team, formed approximately 25 years after the first, was also led by Martin Champion. He was convinced that the original team's nemesis, the Dark Destroyer, still existed. Although he was correct, most of the rest of humanity did not believe it, but humored him due to his heroic status in successfully leading the original Atari Force to find New Earth. Other team members included Christopher "Tempest" Champion, son of Martin Champion and Lydia Perez; Erin "Dart" Bia O'Rourke-Singh, daughter of Mohandas Singh and Li-San O'Rourke; Hukka; Morphea, an insectoid empath; Babe, an alien toddler of immense size and strength; and Pakrat, a humanoid rodent thief. Later additions to the team were Blackjak, Dart's human lover; Taz, a short alien warrior; and Kargg, the Dark Destroyer's former chief underling.

=== DC Universe ===
Shazam mentions that he saved Atari Force in Gamelands in Shazam! v3. #14 (November 2020).

== Collected editions ==
- Atari Force Trade Paperback (November 15, 2017, ISBN 978-1524105389): Solicited, but not published.
