= DC Heroes =

Superhero tabletop role-playing game

DC Heroes Role-Playing Game
Be Part of the Legend
- First edition box cover
- Designers: Greg Gorden
- Publishers: Mayfair Games
- Publication: 1985 (1st ed.); 1989 (2nd ed.); 1993 (3rd ed.)
- Genres: Superhero
- Systems: Mayfair Exponential Game System

DC Heroes is an out-of-print superhero role-playing game set in the DC Universe and published by Mayfair Games. Other than sharing the same licensed setting, DC Heroes is unrelated to the West End Games DC Universe or the more recent Green Ronin Publishing DC Adventures game.

== Gameplay ==
The game system in DC Heroes is sometimes called the Mayfair Exponential Game System (or MEGS). DC Heroes uses a logarithmic scale for character attributes. For example, a value of 3 is double a value of 2 and four times a value of 1. The scale allows characters of wildly different power levels to co-exist within the same game without one completely dominating a given area. For example, although Superman is many orders of magnitude stronger, Batman is capable of surviving a straight brawl with him for a short period. Conflicts are resolved using an Action Table and two ten-sided dice. The die-rolling system involves re-rolling any double result (the same number on both dice), so that any result is possible. Depending on the result on the Action Table, play moves to a Results Table to determine the degree of success if an action succeeds.

Characters have a set of Attributes, Powers, and Skills. Attributes are the nine qualities every character has. Powers and Skills reflect innate ability or training. Attributes are divided into three categories (Physical, Mental, and Mystical/Spiritual) and three attribute types (Action, Effect, and Resistance). For example, when Superman punches someone, he uses Dexterity to see if he connects, Strength to see how hard he hits, and the opposing character's Body to see how much damage he did. The value of a Power usually serves as both Active Value (AV) and Effect Value (EV) resisted by the target's Resistance Value (RV). All actions taken, even against inanimate objects, use that system. For example, investigators use AV and EV against a RV to determine the quality of information their efforts gather.

Hero Points, which are used as experience points, can be spent during play to influence Action Table Results. Hero Points are also used in the creation of original characters. As in other points-based games, abilities cost a certain number of Hero Points to buy and improve. Because the power level of characters in the DC Universe varies, characters are built using varying amounts of Hero Points depending on the scale of the campaign.

== Features ==
Some of DC Heroes design features include:

- A unified scale ("Attribute Points" or APs) measuring weight, distance, time, volume, money, and information. This allows for quickly evaluating the feasibility and impact of many actions, even at non-intuitive scales. For example, Strength in APs minus the weight of an object in APs is the APs of distance the character can throw that object.
- An exponential progression of Attributes Points—a score of 4 corresponds to twice the quantity of a score of 3, a score of 5 is twice as good as a score of 4 and thus four times as good as score of 3, etc. This rapid progression intends to handle both Superman and Jimmy Olsen without using huge numbers but without drowning the differences between characters.
- A 3×3 grid of physical, mental and mystical/social character stats expressing precision, force, and resilience in each area.
- Action resolution based on 2d10 (re-rolling doubles) and two universal tables.
- A list of broad advantages, drawbacks, and skills that covers most characters.
- A list of powers describing concrete effects rather than abstract game concepts and with a streamlined depiction of super-speed.
- A system of hero points spent by characters to enhance their actions. This expresses endurance, willpower, narrative immunity, luck, and/or story flow.
- A simple system of subplots formalizing character(s)-specific stories that run parallel to the main intrigue — romance, secret identity problems, day job matters, mysterious pasts, power complications, good or bad luck, and/or public image problems.
- A simple system of genre to change the texture of the game system depending upon whether players want Silver Age stories or Iron Age stories.
- Technological and magical inventions, social conflict, special tactics and combat maneuvers, improvised one-off use of powers, and other less distinctive subsystems.

== History ==
Mayfair Games published the first edition in 1985. At the same time, DC released Crisis on Infinite Earths, which reshaped the DC universe. As a result, the game included both Silver Age and pre-Crisis writeups alongside new, post-Crisis write-ups.

Mayfair released a simplified version of DC Heroes called The Batman Role-Playing Game in 1989 to coincide with the Batman film.

The second edition of DC Heroes, published in 1989, was a boxed set which contained a "Read This First" introductory booklet, a "Rules Manual", an introductory adventure "Exposed", and a "Background/Roster Book" with game statistics for almost 250 DC characters. The set also contained the gamemaster's screen, an "Action Wheel" for resolving gameplay, two decks of cards with statistics for DC Comics characters, and dice. The rules incorporated material from the Batman Role-Playing Game and the Superman Sourcebook. These materials also included rules for advantages, drawbacks, and gadgetry.

The third edition, published in 1993, further refined the rules and revamped the point costs of various abilities. Since the release coincided with The Death of Superman and Reign of the Supermen story arcs, it included ratings for the four variant versions of Superman from that story arc.

In 2024, to commemorate the 40th anniversary of the book's original release, Cryptozoic Entertainment launched a crowdfunding campaign on Kickstarter to republish the game.

=== Blood of Heroes ===
Mayfair Games licensed the rights to the Mayfair Exponential Game System to another company, Pulsar Games, which later released the Blood of Heroes role-playing game without the license to use DC Comics' setting. New characters were created for the Blood of Heroes universe. The setting included with the game is a 1990s-style superhero world with occult and magical beings, which accounts for the more detailed magic system included in the game. A subsequent edition, Blood of Heroes: Special Edition, incorporated rule tweaks and much new material.

== Reception ==
DC Heroes was generally well-received. In the September 1985 edition of Dragon, Jeff Grubb found the rules of the first edition complex but well-written and well-presented, calling them "a very user-friendly set of rules that are enjoyable to read without making the reader lose track of what they are teaching". Grubb concluded that only experienced roleplayers were ready for this game: "This is the best product I have yet seen from Mayfair Games. But lest the point be lost, let's say it again: This is not an easy or an introductory game... Come into it with some background in role-playing".

In the Sept-Oct 1985 edition of Space Gamer (issue #76), Allen Varney reviewed the first edition, commenting that "at least the game survives its editing, and it turns out to be an innovating, thoughtful, respectable superhero RPG. Occasionally it's simplistic, but always by design. It is not realistic, but it closely simulated the unreality of the comics. This is a good game for superhero fans who are put off by the intricacy of Champions, the clumsiness of Villains and Vigilantes, and the juvenility of Marvel Super Heroes".

Quentin Long reviewed DC Heroes for Different Worlds magazine and stated that "This is a four-star game, with only trivial flaws. I recommend it unconditionally to any gamer, superhero fans in particular."

In the May 1986 edition of White Dwarf (issue #77), Marcus Rowland found the rules complex, saying that "new players won't find it so easy to use, but shouldn't find it totally incomprehensible". Rowland gave the game an above average overall rating of 8 out of 10.

Stewart Wieck reviewed DC Heroes Role-Playing Game for White Wolf #20, rating the game 4 out of 5 overall, and stated that "I liked the DC Heroes game before, but I find this new version to be excellent. The care taken in the preparation of this game (excluding the adventure) is wonderful. DC Heroes also includes more high quality components than any game ever produced".

In the January 1991 edition of Dragon, Allen Varney reviewed the second edition of the game, and praised the revised rules, stating that the game "combines broad combat options with speed of play. It quantifies noncombat interaction, such as interrogation. Its AP system shows true ingenuity and, in the second edition, improved realism". However, Varney criticized the game's rules for building gadgets, saying that the second edition was "Mayfair's third try at gadgets, and the rules still don't work". Varney concluded his review with "if you find other superhero RPGs too slow or complex for your taste -- and if you don't mind one-table systems -- use the DC HEROES rules as a fast-paced superheroic combat system for your own campaign world".

Gene Alloway reviewed DC Heroes, 3rd Edition in White Wolf #43 (May, 1994), rating it a 3.5 out of 5 and stated that "Compared to all the chrome included in the 2nd Edition, this version is pared back considerably. The price is less, but still high. The system is as worthwhile as ever, but you have to buy other supplements to actually run an adventure."

== Awards ==
DC Heroes RPG won the H.G. Wells Award for Best Roleplaying Rules of 1985.

== Publications ==
=== Adventures ===
- An Element of Danger
- Blood Feud!
- Come on Down!!
- Countdown to Armageddon
- Deadly Fusion
- Don't Ask!
- The Doomsday Program
- Eternity Inc.
- Four Horsemen of Apokolips
- In Hot Pursuit
- King of Crime
- Taking Out the Trash
- The Otherwhere Quest
- Pawns of Time
- Project Prometheus
- Siege
- Wheel of Destruction
- Who Watches the Watchmen?
- World in the Balance

=== Supplements ===
- 2995: The Legion of Super-Heroes Sourcebook
- Batman Sourcebook
- Justice League Sourcebook
- Legion of Super-Heroes Volume I
- Magic
- The New Titans Sourcebook
- The Superman Sourcebook
- Swamp Thing
- Watchmen Sourcebook
- Who's Who in the DC Universe
