= Bob LeRose =

American cartoonist

- Born: Robert K. LeRose or Lerose; June 3, 1921 Brooklyn, New York City, New York
- Died: August 30, 2006 (aged 85) Elmont, New York
- Areas: Cartoonist, Colourist
- Spouses: Alice (died 1992) Veronica (m. 2002)

Robert K. LeRose (/ləˈroʊz/; June 3, 1921 – August 30, 2006) was an American advertising artist and a comic book colorist for DC Comics, who provided the color for hundreds of stories featuring Batman, Superman, and other major characters.

== Biography ==
=== Early life and career ===
Born in Brooklyn, New York City, New York, but raised nearby in the Richmond Hill neighborhood of Queens, Bob LeRose was drafted into the U.S. Army in 1942. Following his discharge three years later, he attended Phoenix Art Institute in New York City on the G.I. Bill. He spent more than two decades as an office manager and a watercolor artist for the advertising agency Johnstone and Cushing, which created custom comics for Boys' Life magazine and other clients. In 1962, when art director Al Stenzel took the Boys' Life account, without which the agency could not survive, LeRose followed Stenzel to the newly formed Stenzel Productions.

=== DC Comics ===
In 1976, comic-book artist Neal Adams, who had worked with LeRose at Johnstone and Cushing, recommended him to DC Comics. LeRose's first recorded credits include Batman Family #11 (June 1977), DC Special #28 (July 1977) and DC Special Series #1 (1977).

LeRose colored across genres, from superheroes (Action Comics, Detective Comics, Justice League America, Legion of Super-Heroes Robin, World's Finest Comics) to the supernatural (Secrets of Haunted House), from war comics (G.I. Combat) to Westerns (Weird Western Tales). In addition, he was among the handful who handled the multi-issue Who's Who: The Definitive Directory of the DC Universe in 1985, and also recolored the hardcover Golden Age of Comic Books reprint series Superman Archives and Batman: The Dark Knight Archives in the 1990s.

From 1986 to 1993, he was, variously, the cover artist or the colorist of Mayfair Games' "DC Heroes" line of roleplaying games, including An Element of Danger, The Green Lantern Corps Sourcebook, Who's Who in the DC Universe, Superman: The Man of Steel Sourcebook, and DC Heroes Role-Playing Game, 3rd Edition.

=== Later life ===
LeRose semi-retired in 1996, continuing to work at DC one day a week, initially in the office and eventually, due to emphysema, at home in Elmont, New York, on Long Island. He died of complications from that disease. He was predeceased by his first wife, Alice, with whom he had three children and who died in 1992. He remarried in 2002, to second wife Veronica, who was 61 when she survived him. LeRose had three children, sons Kenny and John LeRose and daughter Roberta LeRose McIntyre.
