= Bob Smith (comics) =

American comic book artist

- Born: Robert Allen Smith; November 18, 1951 (age 75) Aberdeen, Washington, U.S.
- Area: Inker
- Notable works: Detective Comics

Bob Smith inks on Gene Colan pencil art for Night Force #8 (March 1983). Enlarge to see details, such as delicate lines for auto headlights glowing at bottom.

Robert Allen Smith (born November 18, 1951), better known as Bob Smith, is an American comic book artist, notable as an inker with DC Comics and Archie Comics.

Smith was born in Aberdeen, Washington, and grew up in Grayland, Washington. After studying at Grays Harbor College, a community college in Aberdeen, he graduated in 1974 from Western Washington State College (now Western Washington University), where he took courses in drawing and painting. After Smith became interested in comic books in 1971, he contributed to Mike Friedrich's Star Reach, published from 1974 to 1979.

== DC Comics ==
Shortly after relocating in New York in 1975, Smith entered mainstream comics with the story "The Bogus-Men Will Get You if You Don't Watch Out!" in DC Comics' Plastic Man #12 (April–May 1976), continuing his art education at the Art Students League. From 1982 to 1987, he shared a studio with artist Batton Lash at 225 Lafayette Street, chosen because it is a comics historic address, the location of EC Comics in the 1950s.

He worked for DC until 2011, inking numerous titles, including Black Canary, Detective Comics, Green Lantern, The Huntress, Secrets of Haunted House, Star Trek, and Who's Who: The Definitive Directory of the DC Universe, while also working on DC style guides and other items for Joe Orlando's Special Projects Department.

== Archie Comics ==
Smith drew cartoon features for Crazy Magazine and also worked at Continuity Associates. In 1998, he began inking many titles published by Archie Comics, usually collaborating with Stan Goldberg, and also inking the Archie daily and Sunday strips. Living in Covington, Washington, he continues to embellish pages for Archie Comics.

== Comic strip ==
Distributed by the Creators Syndicate, the Archie comic strip was written by Craig Boldman, pencilled by Fernando Ruiz, lettered by Jon D’Agostino, and inked by Smith.

== Bibliography ==
=== Archie Comics ===
- Uslan, Michael, Stan Goldberg and Bob Smith. Archie Marries. Abrams ComicArts, 2010. Double die-cut slipcased edition collects seven issues of the Archie Marries Veronica/Archie Marries Betty comic book series with added bonus features.
- Uslan, Michael, Stan Goldberg and Bob Smith. The Archie Wedding: Archie in Will You Marry Me? Archie Comics, 2010. Paperback.

=== Bongo Comics ===
- Bongo Comics Presents Radioactive Man #1–9 (2000–2004)
- Radioactive Man #711 (2007)
- Simpsons Comics #98 (2004)
- Simpsons Comics Presents Bart Simpson #17 (2004)

=== Charlton Neo ===
- Paul Kupperberg's Secret Romances #1 (2015)

=== Dark Horse Comics ===
- Aliens: Colonial Marines #6 (1993)

=== DC Comics ===
- 9-11: The World's Finest Comic Book Writers & Artists Tell Stories to Remember, Volume Two SC (2002)
- Adventure Comics #462, 464, 467–478 (1979–1980)
- The Adventures of Superman #431, 433 (1987)
- Amethyst vol. 2 #6–7, 14 (1985–1986)
- Arak, Son of Thunder #8 (1982)
- Arion, Lord of Atlantis #14–18, 20–22, 24 (1983–1984)
- Atari Force #9, 11–12 (1984)
- Batman #319–320, 323–324 (1980)
- Batman Family #20 (1978)
- Batman: Gotham Adventures #38 (2001)
- Batman: Penguin Triumphant #1 (1992)
- Batman: Shadow of the Bat #26–29 (1994)
- Batman: Turning Points #3 (2001)
- Black Canary vol. 2 #1–2, 4–7, 9–11 (1993)
- The Brave and the Bold #153, 156 (1979)
- Cancelled Comic Cavalcade #1 (1978)
- Captain Atom #1–19, 22, 25–27, Annual #1–2 (1987–1989)
- Captain Carrot and His Amazing Zoo Crew! #1, 3 (1982)
- Cartoon Cartoons #14, 17, 28, 32–33 (2003–2004)
- Cartoon Network Action Pack #2–3, 6–8, 12–14, 16–17, 19, 21, 25, 27–28, 30–31, 33–37, 39–41, 44–45, 55 (2006–2011)
- Cartoon Network Block Party #1–2, 5–6, 8, 12–14, 18 (2004–2006)
- Cartoon Network Presents #2, 13 (1997–1998)
- Catwoman #13–37, #0 (1994–1996)
- Cosmic Boy #1–3 (1986–1987)
- Darkstars #10 (1993)
- DC Challenge #1, 3 (1985–1986)
- DC Comics Presents #39, 45, 63, 97 (1981–1986)
- DC Special Series #4 (1977)
- DC Super Stars #17 (1977)
- Deathstroke, the Terminator Annual #3 (1994)
- Demon vol. 3 #14–17, 20, 23–29 (1991–1992)
- Detective Comics #481–482, 486, 489–490, 492, 494, 496, 500, 532–533, 535–542, 545–546, 548–552, 555–567 (1978–1986)
- The Flash #265, 290–292, 296–307 (1978–1982)
- Forever People vol. 2 #3 (1988)
- Freedom Fighters #6 (1977)
- The Fury of Firestorm #54, Annual #4 (1986)
- Green Lantern vol. 2 #92, 108, 128, 154–155, 177, 199 (1976–1986)
- Green Lantern Corps Quarterly #1, 5 (1992–1993)
- Hardware #11, 15 (1994)
- House of Mystery #253, 256, 273, 275, 300–301, 310 (1977–1982)
- Huntress #2–12, 15–19 (1989–1990)
- Isis #4 (1977)
- Justice League America #54, 75, Annual #4 (1990–1993)
- Justice League Europe #8, 20 (1989–1990)
- Justice League of America #190, 201, 256–258 (1981–1987)
- Justice League Quarterly #3, 14 (1991–1994)
- Kamandi, the Last Boy on Earth #43, 45 (1976)
- L.E.G.I.O.N. '92 Annual #3 (1992)
- Legion of Super-Heroes vol. 3 #16 (1985)
- 'Mazing Man #6, 10 (1986)
- Men of War #8 (1978)
- Mystery in Space #112, 116 (1980–1981)
- The New Teen Titans #16 (Captain Carrot insert preview), #21 (Night Force insert preview) (1982)
- The New Titans #68–69 (1990)
- Night Force #1–14 (1982–1983)
- Omega Men #26–27, 36 (1985–1986)
- Outsiders #22–23, Special #1 (1987)
- Plastic Man #12–13, 15–20 (1976–1977)
- Robin #1–5 (1991)
- Robin II #1–4 (1991–1992)
- Robin III: Cry of the Huntress #1–6 (1992–1993)
- Robin vol. 4 #16, 35–41, 43–45, 47–49 (1995–1998)
- Scooby-Doo #3, 7, 9, 11 (1997–1998)
- Secret Society of Super Villains #1–2, 13–15 (1976–1978)
- Secrets of Haunted House #9, 14, 37, 40 (1977–1981)
- Shazam #32 (1977)
- Star Spangled War Stories #203 (1976)
- Star Trek Annual #1–2 (1985–1986)
- Star Trek: The Next Generation Annual #4–5 (1993–1994)
- Starfire #1 (1976)
- Starman #1–9, 11, 13–14 (1988–1989)
- Super Friends #3–27, 29–30, 32, 35, 43, 45 (1977–1981)
- The Superman Family #182, 184, 187, 193, 196 (1977–1979)
- Tales of the Teen Titans #51 (1985)
- Tarzan Family #65 (1976)
- Teen Titans #44, 52 (1976–1977)
- Teen Titans Spotlight #3 (1986)
- Timber Wolf #5 (1993)
- Time Warp #1 (1979)
- Tiny Toon Adventures Magazine #2 (1990)
- The Unexpected #200, 213 (1980–1981)
- Unknown Soldier #210, 215 (1977–1978)
- The Warlord #41, 43, 45, 47, 50, 70–71, 75, Annual #2, 4 (1981–1985)
- Weird War Tales #69, 71, 107 (1978–1982)
- Who's Who in Star Trek #2 (1987)
- Who's Who in the DC Universe #6, 10, 13 (1991)
- Who's Who in the Legion of Super-Heroes #3–6 (1988)
- Who's Who: The Definitive Directory of the DC Universe #2–5, 7–18, 20–23, 25 (1985–1987)
- Who's Who: Update '87 #1–2, 4 (1987)
- Who's Who Update '88 #3–4 (1988)
- Wonder Woman #269, 284–285 (1980–1981)
- Wonder Woman vol. 2 #16 (1988)
- World's Finest Comics #244, 249, 257, 266–268, 270, 273–274, 276, 280, 297, 300 (1977–1984)

==== DC Comics / United States Postal Service ====
- Celebrate the Century [Super Heroes Stamp Album] #1–4 (1998)

=== First Comics ===
- Warp #1–2 (1983)

=== HM Communications, Inc. ===
- Heavy Metal #v4#5 (1980)

=== Malibu Comics ===
- Prime #25–26 (1995)

=== Marvel Comics ===
- Crazy Magazine #15–16 (1976)
- Fury / Agent 13 #1 (1998)
- Power Man #47 (1977)
- Prime vs. the Incredible Hulk #0 (1995)
- The Savage Hulk #1 (1996)

=== Star Reach ===
- Star Reach #3–4 (1975–1976)

== Awards and honors ==
In 2025, he was awarded the Inkwell Awards Stacy Aragon Special Recognition Award.

| Preceded by Alfredo Alcala | Detective Comics inker 1983–1986 | Succeeded by Klaus Janson |
| Preceded by n/a | Captain Atom vol. 2 inker 1987–1989 | Succeeded by Romeo Tanghal |
| Preceded by Rick Burchett | Catwoman vol. 2 inker 1994–1996 | Succeeded by Mark Pennington |
