= Ray Winninger =

American game designer

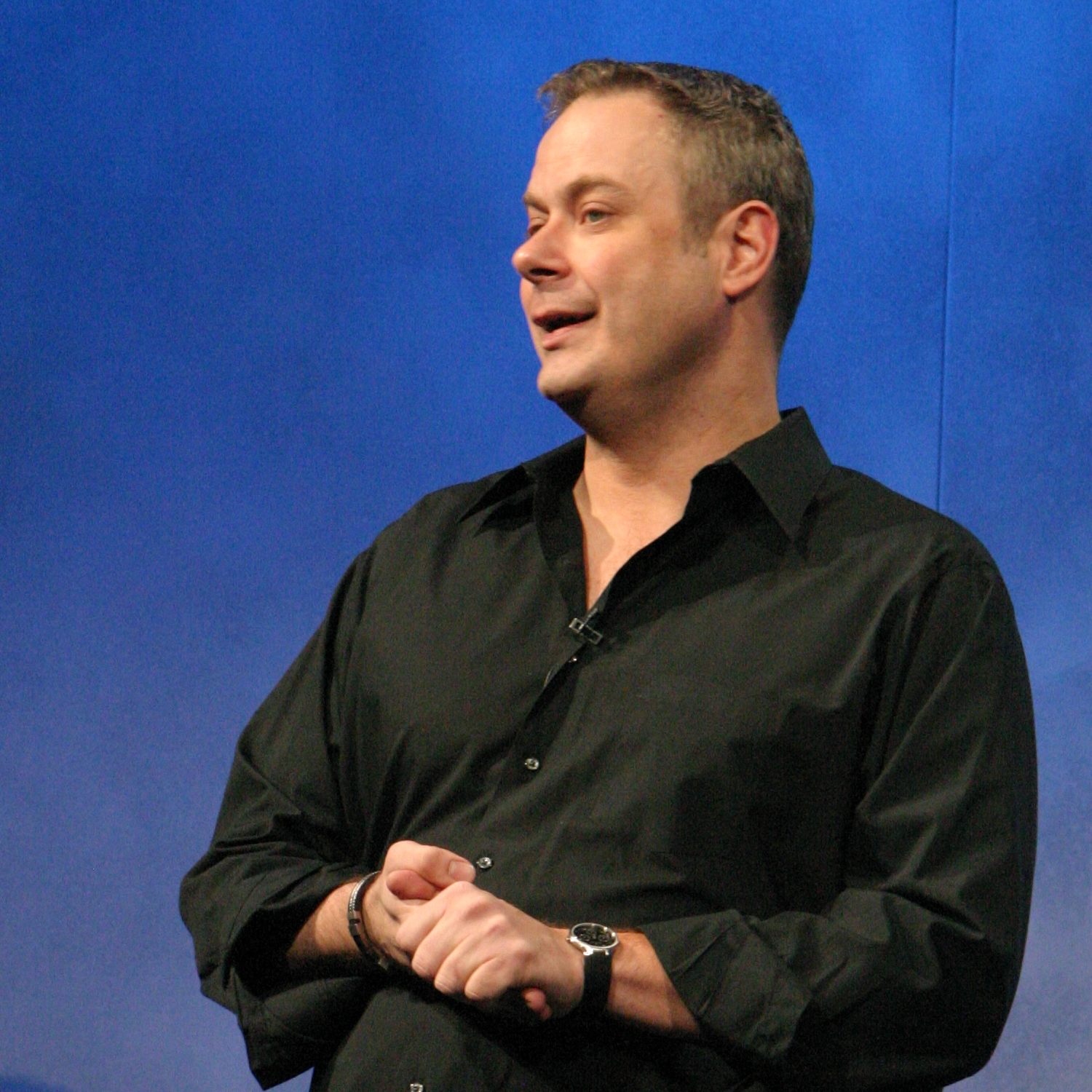
- Winninger in 2008
- Born: Ray Winninger
- Occupations: Writer, game designer
- Writing career
- Genres: Role-playing games, miniature wargaming, fantasy

Ray Winninger is a game designer who has worked on a number of roleplaying games, including the Dungeons & Dragons fantasy roleplaying game. He is the former Executive Producer for the Wizards of the Coast Dungeons & Dragons studio.

== Early life ==
Ray Winninger was a competitive chess player as a child, and at age nine, he discovered Avalon Hill games and Dungeons & Dragons while looking for chess opponents at a local hobby shop/game store. He designed his first game as "a futuristic man-to-man miniatures system", and by age fourteen he had designed an enormous campaign world for the Dungeons & Dragons game system.

== Career ==
Winninger's first published work was an adventure called Countdown! for FASA's Doctor Who role-playing game. He worked for TSR, including work on Dungeons & Dragons, throughout the 1980s and early 1990s.

Winninger was the co-designer of DC Heroes and Torg. He then worked on staff at Mayfair Games, and became Editorial Director for Mayfair after Chill was released. He brought back the Role Aids line, intending to recreate it with more sophisticated material for AD&D than that which TSR was producing at the time. Winninger designed the Underground (1993) role-playing game for Mayfair Games. Underground was set in the year 2021 and "allowed players to assume the roles of superhuman, genetically enhanced soldiers fighting a patriotic war to take their society back from a corrupt government"; when Mayfair Games withdrew much of its support of the game despite its popularity, Winninger moved onto other projects. Mayfair also intended to produce a game called D.O.A. by Greg Gorden with major contributions by Winninger, but the game was never published. He worked for Dragon magazine, first taking over the "RPG reviews" column from Chris Pramas, before moving on to "Dungeoncraft", a column for guiding Dungeon Masters to create their own campaign worlds. He also worked as a contributing editor of Dragon magazine.

Winninger later became a senior platform strategist at Microsoft.

In 2020, Winninger became the Executive Producer in charge of the Dungeons & Dragons studio at Wizards of the Coast replacing Mike Mearls, the previous Dungeons & Dragons design team head. In October 2022, Winninger announced that he had left Wizards of the Coast.

== Works ==
Ray Winninger has worked for TSR, West End Games, Mayfair Games, Last Unicorn Games, and Pulsar Games. His "Dungeoncraft" column ran in Dragon from 1999-2002, during which time he also served as a contributing editor to the magazine.

He was the executive producer for Harebrained Schemes' 2014 Miniature wargaming game Golem Arcana.
