= Ed Hannigan =

Comic creator

- Born: Edward Hannigan; August 6, 1951 (age 75)
- Areas: Writer, Penciller, Editor
- Notable works: Batman: Legends of the Dark Knight; The Defenders; Green Arrow; The Spectacular Spider-Man

Edward Hannigan (born August 6, 1951) is an American comics artist, writer, and editor for both Marvel Comics and DC Comics.

== Career ==
Ed Hannigan's first credited comics story was published in Marvel Comics' licensed Planet of the Apes #5 (Feb. 1975). His writing credits include work on The Defenders from issue #67 (Jan. 1979) to #91 (Jan. 1981). Hannigan started as the series' artist but, while working on the story arc in issues #66 to #68, "I got in a pinch ... and asked [Hannigan] to help me," writer David Anthony Kraft recalled. "He felt self-conscious ... but I told him he'd be fine. He eventually got into it." Hannigan found it too difficult to both write and draw the series, so by the end of the story arc he was working solely as writer. As the artist on The Spectacular Spider-Man #64 (March 1982), Hannigan and writer Bill Mantlo co-created the characters Cloak and Dagger, who later appeared in a live-action television series on Freeform in 2018–2019.

At DC Comics, Hannigan redesigned the Brainiac character into a chromed, more robotic form which debuted in Action Comics #544 (June 1983). He pencilled the covers on Batman in a lengthy run that spanned the majority of 1983–1985 with Don Newton providing the interior art. Hannigan and writer Mike Grell launched the first Green Arrow ongoing series in February 1988. The Batman: Legends of the Dark Knight series began in November 1989 with the five-part "Shaman" storyline by Hannigan and writer Dennis O'Neil. He both wrote and illustrated the three-issue prestige format series Skull & Bones for DC in 1992.

== Personal life ==
Hannigan and his wife Heidi are the parents of Jean Anne, born in 1989.

In January 2010, Marvel Comics and The Hero Initiative published Ed Hannigan: Covered a fundraising effort to assist with Hannigan's medical expenses due to multiple sclerosis.

== Bibliography ==
=== DC Comics ===
- Action Comics #544 (one page), #666 (penciller) (1983–1991)
- The Adventures of Superman #479, Annual #5 (penciller) (1991–1993)
- Aquaman Annual #2 (penciller) (1996)
- Atari Force #16, 19 (penciller) (1985)
- Batman: Legends of the Dark Knight #1–5 (penciller) (1989–1990)
- Deathstroke, the Terminator #39–40 (artist) (1994)
- Green Arrow vol. 2 #1–6, 9–12, 15–16, 19–20, Annual #2 (penciller) (1988–1989)
- Hawkman vol. 2 #17 (penciller) (1987)
- Heroes Against Hunger #1 (writer) (1986)
- League of Justice #1–2 (writer/penciller) (1996)
- The New Teen Titans Annual vol. 2 #1 (penciller) (1985)
- Showcase '93 #1–4 (Catwoman) (penciller) (1993)
- Skull & Bones #1–3 (writer/artist) (1992)
- Superman #408 (plotter) (1985)
- Superman vol. 2 #56 (penciller) (1991)

=== Marvel Comics ===
- The Amazing Spider-Man Annual #17 (penciller) (1983)
- Black Panther #13–15 (writer) (1979)
- The Defenders #58–61, 66 (penciller); #67 (writer/penciller), #68, 70–75, 78–91 (writer) (1978–1981)
- Ed Hannigan: Covered #1 (2010)
- Fantastic Four Annual #16 (1981)
- Giant-Size Man-Thing #4–5 (penciller) (1975)
- Kull the Destroyer #16–20 (penciller) (1976–1977)
- Marvel Premiere #42 (Tigra); #51–53 (Black Panther) (writer) (1978–1980)
- Marvel Preview #4 (penciller) (1976)
- Planet of the Apes #5 (penciller) (1975)
- Power Man and Iron Fist #54–55 (writer) (1978–1979)
- Son of Satan #6 (penciller) (1976)
- The Spectacular Spider-Man #60–62, 64, 66–67, 69–70, 72 (penciller) (1981–1982)
- Star Trek #17 (penciller) (1981)

Preceded by George Tuska	The Defenders artist 1978–1979	Succeeded by Herb Trimpe
Preceded by Jo Duffy	The Defenders writer 1979–1981	Succeeded by J. M. DeMatteis
Preceded by Jim Shooter	The Spectacular Spider-Man artist 1981–1982	Succeeded by Al Milgrom
Preceded by n/a	Green Arrow vol. 2 artist 1988–1989	Succeeded by Dan Jurgens
Preceded by n/a	Batman: Legends of the Dark Knight artist 1989–1990	Succeeded by Klaus Janson
