= Unfilmability =

Concept in media production

Unfilmability is a type of medium specificity which prevents a work of literature from undergoing successful film or television adaptation. A wide variety of considerations can lead to a work being seen as unfilmable. These include aesthetic conventions, audience expectations, technological limitations and ethical or political considerations.

In his Theory of the Film, Béla Balázs discussed (but ultimately rejected) a theoretical argument against adaptation, based on the idea that if there is "an organic connection between form and content in every art" then it must be concluded that "one may perhaps make a good film out of a bad novel, but never out of a good one".

With the rise of prestigious and well-funded TV series in what is considered a Golden Age of Television in the 21st century, some works previously considered unfilmable have undergone visual adaptations. Among works long considered unfilmable that have ultimately been successfully filmed are The Lord of the Rings, Dune, Watchmen, Gerald's Game, American Psycho, and Neuromancer.

== See also ==
- Medium essentialism
