= Who Watches the Watchmen? =

1987 tabletop role-playing game adventure

- Cover art by Dave Gibbons
- Author: Daniel Greenberg
- Illustrator: Dave Gibbons
- Cover artist: Dave Gibbons; John Higgins
- Language: English
- Series: DC Heroes
- Genre: Superhero
- Set in: DC Universe
- Published: 1987
- Publisher: Mayfair Games
- Media type: Tabletop role-playing game
- Pages: 32

Who Watches the Watchmen? is an adventure published by Mayfair Games in 1987 for the superhero role-playing game DC Heroes that features the Watchmen.

== Plot summary ==
Who Watches the Watchmen? is an adventure featuring the DC Comics characters from the Watchmen comics, set in an alternate world in 1966, before vigilante activity was made illegal by the Keene Act. The player characters, representing people who have been mulling over whether to become crime fighters, have been summoned by Captain Metropolis following a series of kidnappings of retired superheroes and people associated with them.

== Publication history ==
When DC Comics launched the limited 12-issue comic about the Watchmen in 1985, Mayfair president Darwin Bromley immediately felt that it "was going to be hot and [I] immediately asked DC to let us do a module under our DC Heroes Role-playing Game ... we aimed to have it in stores before the maxi-series was finished." True to Bromley's vision, freelance writer Dan Greenberg's rough draft was finished by Issue 6 of the Watchmen series, and the game was on store shelves by the time Issue 10 was released. The result was a 32-page softcover book, with cartography by Jerry O'Malley and Ike Scott, and cover art by John Higgins (color), and Dave Gibbons (sketch, pencils, and inks), who also did the interior illustrations.

== Reception ==
In Issue 4 of the game magazine Gateways, Jeffrey Gomez was pleased with this adventure, noting, "From its' first page, the module captures the spirit of the book with an alarming intensity. Its plot is provocative and frightening."

Marcus L. Rowland reviewed Who Watches the Watchmen? for White Dwarf #91, and wrote that "although this isn't the complete Watchmen sourcepack that I would have liked, it's a lot better than some previous DC material. At 32 pages, with moderately large type, it isn't the best value I've seen in roleplaying games. On the other hand, it isn't as disappointing."

In the October 1987 edition of Dragon (issue #126), Ken Rolston initially liked the "intriguing" premise of the setting, and said: "If this were a Watchman source pack, it would be pretty interesting. Unfortunately, it's not — it's just an adventure, and one with a rather thin plot". He noted that players had to use one of the not-very-interesting pregenerated Watchman characters rather than generating their own characters. Speculating that the designers had been "encumbered by restrictions imposed by the established plotlines and characterizations", Rolston did not recommend this product and said that they should read the comic series and skip the licensed role-playing adventure.
