= Essentialism =

View that entities have identifying attributes

Essentialism is the view that objects have a set of attributes that are necessary to their identity. In early Western thought, Platonic idealism held that all things have such an "essence"—an "idea" or "form". In Categories, Aristotle similarly proposed that all objects have a substance that, as George Lakoff put it, "make the thing what it is, and without which it would be not that kind of thing". The contrary view—non-essentialism—denies the need to posit such an "essence". Essentialism has been controversial from its beginning. In the Parmenides dialogue, Plato depicts Socrates questioning the notion, suggesting that if we accept the idea that every beautiful thing or just action partakes of an essence to be beautiful or just, we must also accept the "existence of separate essences for hair, mud, and dirt".

Older social theories were often conceptually essentialist. In biology and other natural sciences, essentialism provided the rationale for taxonomy at least until the time of Charles Darwin. The role and importance of essentialism in modern biology is still a matter of debate. Beliefs which posit that social identities such as race, ethnicity, nationality, or gender are essential characteristics have been central to many discriminatory or extremist ideologies. For instance, psychological essentialism is correlated with racial prejudice. Essentialist views about race have also been shown to diminish empathy when dealing with members of another racial group. In medical sciences, essentialism can lead to a reified view of identities, leading to fallacious conclusions and potentially unequal treatment.

== In philosophy ==
An essence characterizes a substance or a form, in the sense of the forms and ideas in Platonic idealism. It is permanent, unalterable, and eternal, and is present in every possible world. Classical humanism has an essentialist conception of the human, in its endorsement of the notion of an eternal and unchangeable human nature. This has been criticized by Kierkegaard, Marx, Heidegger, Sartre, Badiou and many other existential, materialist and anti-humanist thinkers. Essentialism, in its broadest sense, is any philosophy that acknowledges the primacy of essence. Unlike existentialism, which posits "being" as the fundamental reality, the essentialist ontology must be approached from a metaphysical perspective. Empirical knowledge is developed from experience of a relational universe whose components and attributes are defined and measured in terms of intellectually constructed laws. Thus, for the scientist, reality is explored as an evolutionary system of diverse entities, the order of which is determined by the principle of causality.

In Plato's philosophy, in particular the Timaeus and the Philebus, things were said to come into being by the action of a demiurge who works to form chaos into ordered entities. Similarly, many definitions of essence hark back to the ancient Greek hylomorphic understanding of the formation of the things as articulated, for example, by Aristotle. According to that account, the structure and real existence of any thing can be understood by analogy to an artefact produced by a craftsperson. The craftsperson requires hyle (timber or wood) and a model, plan or idea in their own mind, according to which the wood is worked to give it the indicated contour or form (morphe). Aristotle was the first to use the terms hyle and morphe, developing an account indebted to Plato's. According to Aristotle's explanation, all entities have two aspects: "matter" and "form". It is the particular form imposed that gives some matter its identity—its quiddity or "whatness" (i.e., "what it is"). Plato was one of the first essentialists, postulating the concept of ideal forms—an abstract entity of which individual objects are mere facsimiles. To give an example: the ideal form of a circle is a perfect circle, something that is physically impossible to make manifest; yet the circles we draw and observe clearly have some idea in common—the ideal form. Plato proposed that these ideas are eternal and vastly superior to their manifestations, and that we understand these manifestations in the material world by comparing and relating them to their respective ideal form. Plato's forms are regarded as patriarchs to essentialist dogma simply because they are a case of what is intrinsic and a-contextual of objects—the abstract properties that make them what they are. One example is Plato's parable of the cave. Plato believed that the universe was perfect and that its observed imperfections came from man's limited perception of it. For Plato, there were two realities: the "essential" or ideal and the "perceived".

Aristotle (384–322 BC) applied the term essence to that which things in a category have in common and without which they cannot be members of that category (for example, rationality is the essence of man; without rationality a creature cannot be a man). In his critique of Aristotle's philosophy, Bertrand Russell said that his concept of essence transferred to metaphysics what was only a verbal convenience and that it confused the properties of language with the properties of the world. In fact, a thing's "essence" consisted in those defining properties without which we could not use the name for it, rather than those properties without which a thing would not be what kind of thing it actually is. Although the concept of essence was, according to Bertrand Russell, "hopelessly muddled" it became part of every philosophy until modern times. The Egyptian-born philosopher Plotinus (204–270 AD) brought idealism to the Roman Empire as Neoplatonism, and with it the concept that not only do all existents emanate from a "primary essence" but that the mind plays an active role in shaping or ordering the objects of perception, rather than passively receiving empirical data.

== Examples ==
=== Naturalism ===
Dating back to the 18th century, naturalism is a form of essentialism in which social matters are explained through the logic of natural dispositions. The invoked nature can be biological, ontological or theological. It is opposed by antinaturalism and culturalism.

==== Human nature ====
In the case of Homo sapiens, the divergent conceptions of human nature may be partitioned into essentialist versus non-essentialist (or even anti-essentialist) positions. Another established dichotomy is that of monism versus pluralism about the matter.

Monism will demand that enhancement technologies be used to create humans as close as possible to the ideal state. [...] The Nazis would have proposed the list of characteristics for admission to the SS as the universal template for enhancement technologies. Hedonistic utilitarianism is a less objectionable version of monism, according to which the best human life is one that contains as much pleasure and as little suffering as possible – but like Nazism, it leaves no room for meaningful choice about enhancement.

— Nicholas Agar

=== Biological essentialism ===
Before evolution was developed as a scientific theory, the essentialist view of biology posited that all species are unchanging throughout time. The historian Mary P. Winsor has argued that biologists such as Louis Agassiz in the 19th century believed that taxa such as species and genus were fixed, reflecting the mind of the creator. Some religious opponents of evolution continue to maintain this view of biology.

The most widely discussed non-essentialist alternative in contemporary philosophy of biology is homeostatic property cluster theory, on which a species is characterised by a cluster of properties whose co-occurrence is maintained by causal mechanisms, with no property necessary for membership and no sharp boundary to the kind.

Work by historians of systematic biology in the 21st century has cast doubt upon this view of pre-Darwinian thinkers. Winsor, Ron Amundson and Staffan Müller-Wille have each argued that in fact the usual suspects (such as Linnaeus and the Ideal Morphologists) were very far from being essentialists, and that the so-called "essentialism story" (or "myth") in biology is a result of conflating the views expressed and biological examples used by philosophers going back to Aristotle and continuing through to John Stuart Mill and William Whewell in the immediately pre-Darwinian period, with the way that biologists used such terms as species.

Anti-essentialists contend that an essentialist typological categorization has been rendered obsolete and untenable by evolutionary theory for several reasons. First, they argue that biological species are dynamic entities, emerging and disappearing as distinct populations are molded by natural selection. This view contrasts with the static essences that essentialists say characterize natural categories. Second, the opponents of essentialism argue that our current understanding of biological species emphasizes genealogical relationships rather than intrinsic traits. Lastly, non-essentialists assert that every organism has a mutational load, and the variability and diversity within species contradict the notion of fixed biological natures.

=== Gender essentialism ===
In feminist theory and gender studies, gender essentialism is the attribution of fixed essences to men and women—this idea that men and women are fundamentally different continues to be a matter of contention. Gay/lesbian rights advocate Diana Fuss wrote: "Essentialism is most commonly understood as a belief in the real, true essence of things, the invariable and fixed properties which define the 'whatness' of a given entity." Women's essence is assumed to be universal and is generally identified with those characteristics viewed as being specifically feminine. These ideas of femininity are usually biologized and are often preoccupied with psychological characteristics, such as nurturance, empathy, support, and non-competitiveness, etc. Feminist theorist Elizabeth Grosz states in her 1995 publication Space, Time, and Perversion: Essays on the Politics of Bodies that essentialism

entails the belief that those characteristics defined as women's essence are shared in common by all women at all times. It implies a limit of the variations and possibilities of change—it is not possible for a subject to act in a manner contrary to her essence. Her essence underlies all the apparent variations differentiating women from each other. Essentialism thus refers to the existence of fixed characteristic, given attributes, and ahistorical functions that limit the possibilities of change and thus of social reorganization.

Gender essentialism is pervasive in popular culture, as illustrated by the #1 New York Times best seller Men Are from Mars, Women Are from Venus, but this essentialism is routinely critiqued in introductory women's studies textbooks such as Women: Images & Realities. Starting in the 1980s, some feminist writers have put forward essentialist theories about gender and science. Evelyn Fox Keller, Sandra Harding, and Nancy Tuana argued that the modern scientific enterprise is inherently patriarchal and incompatible with women's nature. Other feminist scholars, such as Ann Hibner Koblitz, Lenore Blum, Mary Gray, Mary Beth Ruskai, and Pnina Abir-Am and Dorinda Outram have criticized those theories for ignoring the diverse nature of scientific research and the tremendous variation in women's experiences in different cultures and historical periods.

=== Racial and cultural essentialism ===
Cultural and racial essentialism is the view that fundamental biological or physical characteristics of human "races" produce personality, heritage, cognitive abilities, or 'natural talents' that are shared by all members of a racial group. In the early 20th century, many anthropologists taught this theory – that race was an entirely biological phenomenon and that this was core to a person's behavior and identity. This, coupled with a belief that linguistic, cultural, and social groups fundamentally existed along racial lines, formed the basis of what is now called scientific racism. After the Nazi eugenics program, along with the rise of anti-colonial movements, racial essentialism lost widespread popularity. New studies of culture and the fledgling field of population genetics undermined the scientific standing of racial essentialism, leading race anthropologists to revise their conclusions about the sources of phenotypic variation. A significant number of modern anthropologists and biologists in the West came to view race as an invalid genetic or biological designation.

Historically, beliefs which posit that social identities such as ethnicity, nationality or gender determine a person's essential characteristics have in many cases been shown to have destructive or harmful results. It has been argued by some that essentialist thinking lies at the core of many simplistic, discriminatory or extremist ideologies. Psychological essentialism is also correlated with racial prejudice. In medical sciences, essentialism can lead to an over-emphasis on the role of identities—for example assuming that differences in hypertension in African-American populations are due to racial differences rather than social causes—leading to fallacious conclusions and potentially unequal treatment. Older social theories were often conceptually essentialist.

=== Strategic essentialism ===
Strategic essentialism, a concept in postcolonial theory, was introduced in the 1980s by the Indian literary critic and theorist Gayatri Chakravorty Spivak. It refers to a political tactic in which minority groups, nationalities, or ethnic groups mobilize on the basis of shared gendered, cultural, or political identity. While strong differences may exist between members of these groups, and among themselves they engage in continuous debates, it is sometimes advantageous for them to temporarily "essentialize" themselves, despite it being based on erroneous logic, and to bring forward their group identity in a simplified way to achieve certain goals, such as equal rights or antiglobalization.

=== Machine learning ===
Pelillo argues that traditional machine learning techniques often align with an essentialist paradigm by relying on features - properties assumed to be essential for classification tasks. For instance, pattern recognition, which attempts to extract essential attributes from data, is described as inherently essentialist since it presupposes that objects have stable, identifiable essences that define their categories. This perspective extends to similarity-based approaches, which use prototype theory to establish relationships within data by grouping instances around central prototypes that exhibit the "essence" of a category.

Expanding on this, Pelillo and Scantamburlo highlight that certain machine-learning scenarios, such as when data is highly dimensional or features are poorly defined, challenge the essentialist framework. They advocate for alternative paradigms that consider relational and contextual information instead of isolated feature analysis. This relational focus aligns with anti-essentialist stances, which view categories as dynamic and context-dependent rather than fixed.

== In historiography ==
Essentialism in history as a field of study entails discerning and listing essential cultural characteristics of a particular nation or culture, in the belief that a people or culture can be understood in this way. Sometimes such essentialism leads to claims of a praiseworthy national or cultural identity, or to its opposite, the condemnation of a culture based on presumed essential characteristics. Herodotus, for example, claims that Egyptian culture is essentially feminized and possesses a "softness" which has made Egypt easy to conquer. To what extent Herodotus was an essentialist is a matter of debate; he is also credited with not essentializing the concept of the Athenian identity, or differences between the Greeks and the Persians that are the subject of his Histories.

Essentialism had been operative in colonialism, as well as in critiques of colonialism. Post-colonial theorists, such as Edward Said, insisted that essentialism was the "defining mode" of "Western" historiography and ethnography until the nineteenth century and even after, according to Touraj Atabaki, manifesting itself in the historiography of the Middle East and Central Asia as Eurocentrism, over-generalization, and reductionism. Into the 21st century, most historians, social scientists, and humanists reject methodologies associated with essentialism, although some have argued that certain varieties of essentialism may be useful or even necessary.

✗ Unrelated Karl Popper splits the ambiguous term realism into essentialism and realism. He uses essentialism whenever he means the opposite of nominalism, and realism only as opposed to idealism. Popper himself is a realist as opposed to an idealist, but a methodological nominalist as opposed to an essentialist. For example, statements like "a puppy is a young dog" should be read from right to left as an answer to "What shall we call a young dog", never from left to right as an answer to "What is a puppy?"

== In psychology ==
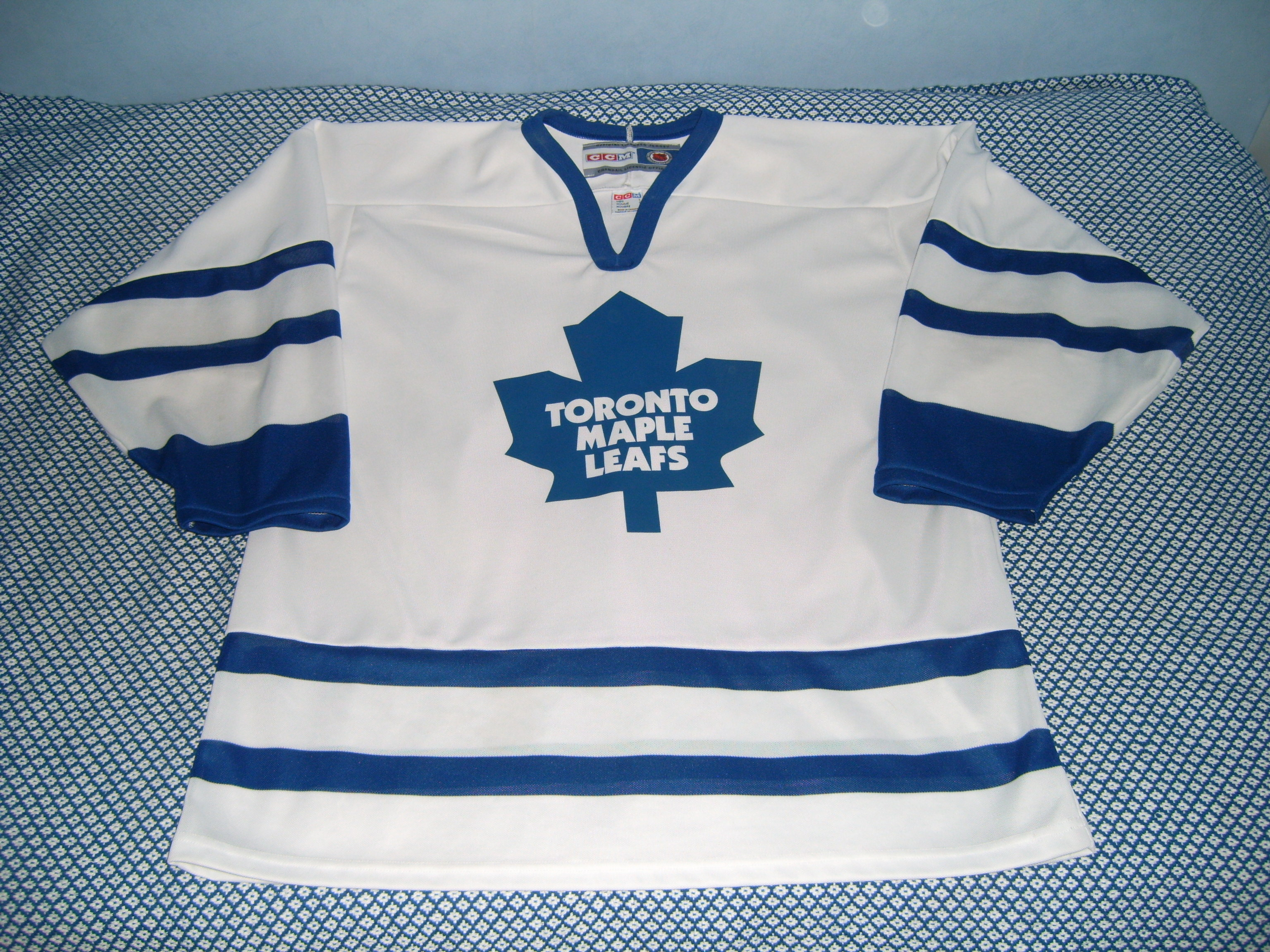
Paul Bloom attempts to explain why people will pay more in an auction for the clothing of celebrities if the clothing is unwashed. He believes the answer to this and many other questions is that people cannot help but think of objects as containing a sort of "essence" that can be influenced.

There is a difference between metaphysical essentialism and psychological essentialism, the latter referring not to an actual claim about the world but a claim about a way of representing entities in cognition. Influential in this area is Susan Gelman, who has outlined many domains in which children and adults construe classes of entities, particularly biological entities, in essentialist terms—i.e., as if they had an immutable underlying essence which can be used to predict unobserved similarities between members of that class. This causal relationship is unidirectional; an observable feature of an entity does not define the underlying essence.

=== In developmental psychology ===
Essentialism has emerged as an important concept in psychology, particularly developmental psychology. In 1991, Kathryn Kremer and Susan Gelman studied the extent to which children from four–seven years old demonstrate essentialism. Children believed that underlying essences predicted observable behaviours. Children were able to describe living objects' behaviour as self-perpetuated and non-living objects' behavior as a result of an adult influencing the object. Understanding the underlying causal mechanism for behaviour suggests essentialist thinking. Younger children were unable to identify causal mechanisms of behaviour whereas older children were able to. This suggests that essentialism is rooted in cognitive development. It can be argued that there is a shift in the way that children represent entities, from not understanding the causal mechanism of the underlying essence to showing sufficient understanding.

There are four key criteria that constitute essentialist thinking. The first facet is the aforementioned individual causal mechanisms. The second is innate potential: the assumption that an object will fulfill its predetermined course of development. According to this criterion, essences predict developments in entities that will occur throughout its lifespan. The third is immutability. Despite altering the superficial appearance of an object it does not remove its essence. Observable changes in features of an entity are not salient enough to alter its essential characteristics. The fourth is inductive potential. This suggests that entities may share common features but are essentially different; however similar two beings may be, their characteristics will be at most analogous, differing most importantly in essences. The implications of psychological essentialism are numerous. Prejudiced individuals have been found to endorse exceptionally essential ways of thinking, suggesting that essentialism may perpetuate exclusion among social groups. For example, essentialism of nationality has been linked to anti-immigration attitudes. In multiple studies in India and the United States, it was shown that in lay view a person's nationality is considerably fixed at birth, even if that person is adopted and raised by a family of another nationality at day one and never told about their origin. This may be due to an over-extension of an essential-biological mode of thinking stemming from cognitive development. Paul Bloom of Yale University has stated that "one of the most exciting ideas in cognitive science is the theory that people have a default assumption that things, people and events have invisible essences that make them what they are. Experimental psychologists have argued that essentialism underlies our understanding of the physical and social worlds, and developmental and cross-cultural psychologists have proposed that it is instinctive and universal. We are natural-born essentialists." Scholars suggest that the categorical nature of essentialist thinking predicts the use of stereotypes and can be targeted in the application of stereotype prevention.

== See also ==
- Biological determinism
- Determinism
- Educational essentialism
- Moral panic
- Nature vs. nurture
- Mereological essentialism
- Medium essentialism
- National essentialism (Japan)
- Non-essentialism
- Poststructuralism
- Primordialism
- Social constructionism
- Scientific essentialism
- Structuralism
- Traditionalist School
- Vitalism

Political acceptance

- Ethnic nationalism
- Identity politics
- Strategic essentialism

People

- Brian David Ellis (new essentialism)
- Greg McKeown (Essentialism: The Disciplined Pursuit of Less)
