= Medium essentialism =

Philosophical theory

Medium essentialism is a philosophical theory stating that each artform has its own distinctive medium, and that the essence of such an artform is dependent on its particular medium. In practice, the theory argues that every artwork should manifest its essential properties, those which no other artform can employ. The theory relies on the presumption that every artform has a unique medium, and is divided into two main interpretations. The ‘limitation’ interpretation of medium essentialism argues that, due to their medium, some artforms should be constrained in their aspirations. The ‘productive’ interpretation reasons that a work's medium determines what content or style will function best, and that practitioners should pursue ventures aligning with the nature of this chosen medium. Clement Greenberg is a prolific medium-essentialist in relation to modernist art, proposing that artists such as Jackson Pollock are successful because they properly exploit elements of their chosen medium, such as a painting's physical flatness. However, medium essentialism was most propagated by film practitioners throughout the twentieth century, as it legitimised cinema as an artform for the first time. Previously, film had been regarded as merely a recorded representation of a written play. It is therefore most discussed today by film theorists, stemming from the work of critics such as André Bazin. Regardless of the interpretation favoured, what constitutes a film's medium, and therefore essential meaning, has been heavily debated, and has prompted the creation of several sub-theories. The theory has been widely discussed among contemporary film theorists and has featured in the Anthology of the Philosophy of Film and Motion Pictures.

Whilst medium essentialism is not merely a subcategory of the Essentialism theory, it is relevant to the notion that certain characteristics are integral to every entity's purpose and identity. Non-essentialism rejects the existence of such an 'essence'. Non-essentialism has been the view preferred by scholars such as Noël Carroll, criticising medium essentialism in relation to film.

== Dream medium essentialism ==
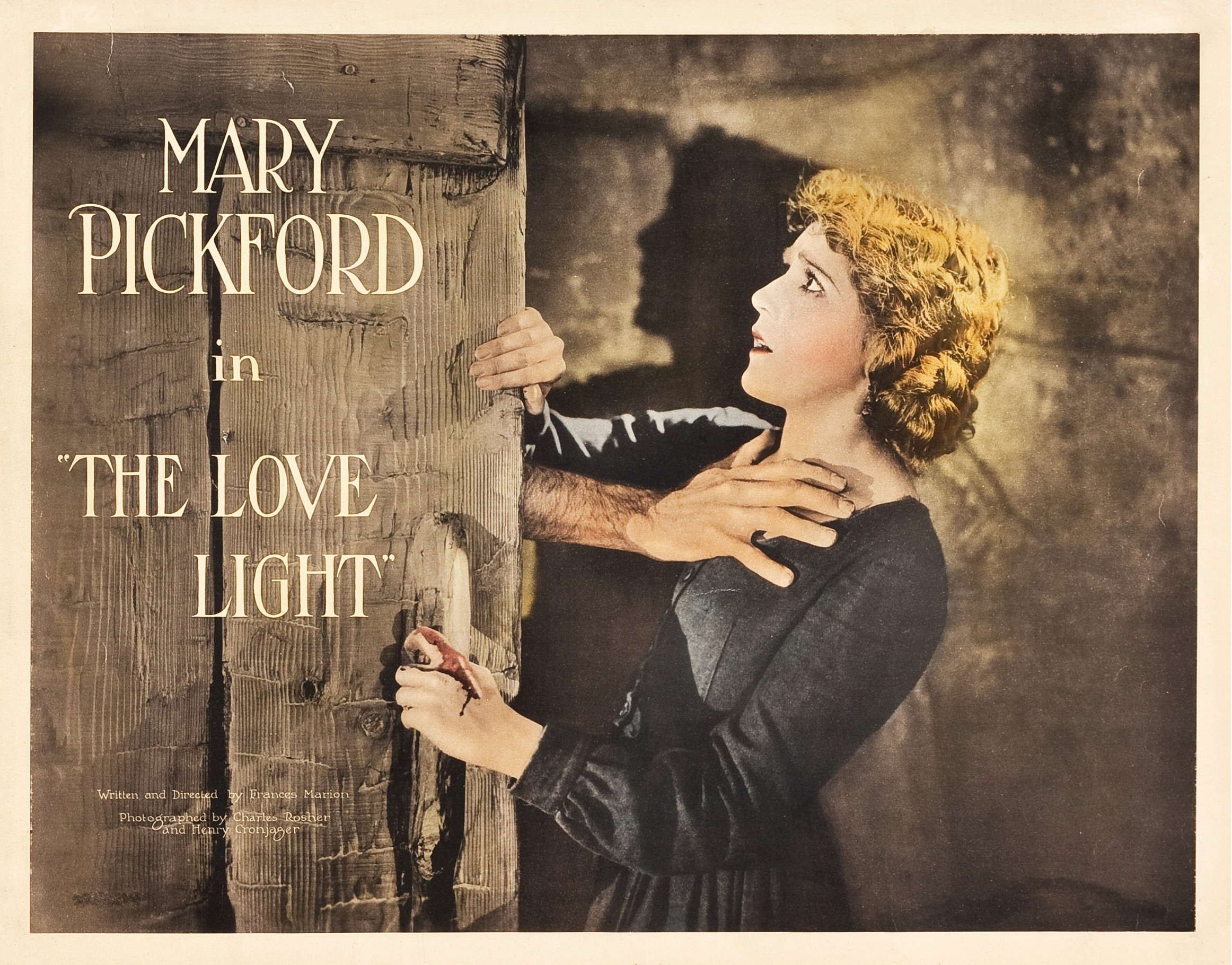
Theatrical release poster for The Love Light, a 1921 silent drama film that Langer argues demonstrates the movement of mainstream film from simple entertainment into an artform.

The sub-theory of dream medium essentialism states that a film's essence is dependent upon its medium, adding that a film's medium is to be found in its creator's intention or ‘dream’. Susanne K. Langer, in her book Feeling and Form, posited this idea. Langer reasoned that film had become its own medium through its use of 'the dream mode', or a direct visual portrayal of an artist's intentions and/or imagination. She pinpointed the time during which cinema began to classify itself as an artform as the early 1920s. She cited films such as The Love Light and The Blacksmith as demonstrating a shift from practitioners creating humorous entertainment or historically accurate texts, to an expression of artistic intentions that result in film being classified as a "new poetic mode." Langer stated that, "The most noteworthy formal characteristic of dream" is that the dreamer "is always at the center of it", the dreamer in this case representing a filmmaker. Langer proposed that a film's essence is determined by its medium (medium essentialism), and that its medium is determined by the 'dream' of its creator, director or practitioner.

Noël Carroll, however, rejects both medium essentialism and Langer's definition of a film's medium as constituted by its creator's 'dream'. Carroll rebukes Langer's statement that the dreamer is 'always at the centre of' the film and that that proves the 'dream' as constituting a film's meaning/essence. He proposes that the "film viewer is not in the center of the array. She is typically off to one side." However, Livingston proposes that Carroll misreads Langer's argument, when it actually refers to the film creator, not the film consumer. Carroll also quotes fellow anti-essentialist critic Stanley Cavell, who argues that dreams are often "boring narratives...their skimpy surface out of all proportion with their riddle interest and their effect on the dreamer."

== Photography medium essentialism ==
Roger Scruton's 'Philosophy of Representation' also agrees with the premise of medium essentialism in relation to film. However, he proposes that since a photograph is transparent, it cannot constitute the essence of a work as it cannot express thought about its subject. This argument relies on the presumption that every artform must be defined by an intention or thought, and not merely its physical substance. This perspective posits that the medium and essence of a photo or film-based artwork must be determined non-materially. Numerically, his argument is as follows:

1. A text's 'essence' must express an opinion regarding its subject.
2. Photography is a transparent representation, and cannot express opinion of any sort.
3. Film is, at its most essential, a photograph of a dramatic representation, and does not contain opinion.
4. The essence of a film cannot lie in its material photography.

Whilst not detailing the place that a film's medium (and therefore essence) should be found in, Scruton's theory rules out any physical location that a film's medium and essence could be found in. It thereby indirectly supports dream medium essentialism.

=== Balázs' Requirement of Intention ===
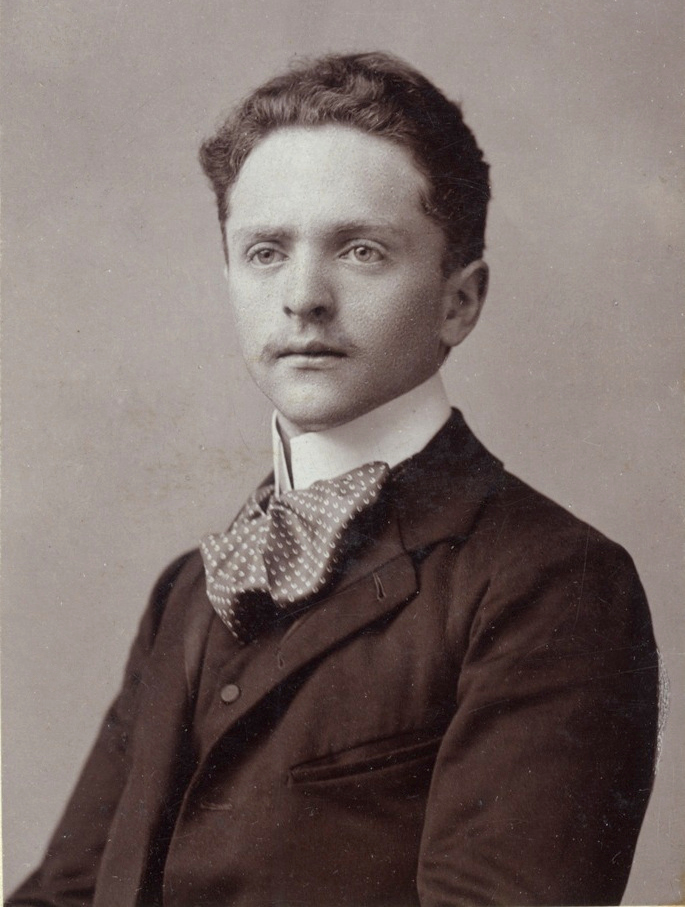
Hungarian film critic and aesthete Béla Balázs, c. 1910s. Balázs was a key proponent of the idea that a film's physical material alone cannot constitute its essence or medium.

In addition to Scruton's proposition, Béla Balázs argued that as a film's physical constitution is transparent, it cannot carry any meaning about its content. Balázs proposes, therefore, that an artform's essence must carry an intention about its subject – and this intention cannot be found within a film's photographic or audio elements. For example, whilst a musical composition or an oil painting provides an opinion about its subject (due to the intention required by creating an artwork from scratch), a photograph cannot in itself contain artistic intention without additional elements being considered, such as a directorial vision or lighting.

== Editing medium essentialism ==
Soviet theorists Dziga Vertov, Vsevolod Pudovkin and Sergei Eisenstein also concur with medium essentialism, adding that a film's medium (and therefore essence) lies in its editing. Pudovkin's essay 'The Plastic Material' (1929) proposes that the manipulation of celluloid (or in the twenty-first century, digital editing) is what defines a film's medium. This process would involve the physical alteration of photographic material, as well as intellectual engagement with what images a film should contain, in relation to the artistic intention of the filmmaker. For example, a work's essence would be constituted by its medium, which is made up of the editing involved in filmwork. This editing, in turn, is fulfilled by physical editing of collected material, as well as a consideration of how that material fits with the overarching intention of the filmmaker. This intention may be related to a plot, or a broader artistic vision. Concerned with a film's materiality, Pudovkin's interpretation of medium essentialism is agreed upon by later publications, including David Rodowick's The Virtual Life of Film (2007), Mary Ann Doane's The Emergence of Cinematic Time (2002), and Phil Rosen's Change Mummified (2001).

Vertov added to this sub-theory, arguing that editing techniques constitute the film's semiotic system, which contains the visual and auditory editing that manipulate recorded images – to the extent that they can create a sequence that has a particular outcome for the film holistically, as an artform in itself. Eisenstein was also a proponent of editing medium essentialism, and within his essay 'Montage of Attractions', reiterated the idea that sound and image editing can be so transformative for the film and the narrative it tells that editing may be considered the essence of a film. He proposed that montage was the defining characteristic of a film's medium and essence, which is necessarily brought about by editing. He proposes that montage cannot simply be found in film and other photographic mediums such as Japanese pictographic writing, but also in natural phenomena like human perception more generally. Eisenstein claims that the medium of film, and the montage it contains, is a satisfaction of the human desire for an artform that contains this montage.

== Reality medium essentialism ==
Stanley Cavell proposes that a film's essence is defined by its medium, and that that medium lies partly within a film's portrayal of an illusion of reality, "Not by literally presenting us with a world, but by permitting us to view it unseen […] we are displaced from our natural habitation within it, placed at a distance from it." Cavell proposed that a film's medium lies in its projection of reality, a notion that is heavily contested by scholars such as Noël Carroll, as his argument relies on the premise that a film's value is determined by how well it represents reality for audiences. Cavell has an almost non-essential conception of a film's medium, yet still subscribes to medium essentialism. He argues a film's medium lies not within its physical material, but by the way in which it represents reality through an artform's ongoing re-invention. Using the example of a 1975 Russian art film, Mirror, Cavell proposes that a filmmaker's accurate portrayal of reality from the perspective of a certain protagonist is what constitutes a film's medium, and therefore essence.

== Criticism ==
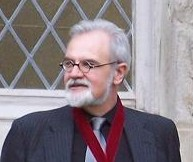
Noël Carroll, a prominent critic of medium essentialism in relation to film (pictured in 2005).

Medium essentialism has been criticised as heavily as it has been praised, with many considering the theory 'narrow'. Most critics of the idea reject the premise that every artform has a distinctive medium which necessarily determines its essence.

V.F. Perkins was one of the first critics of the theory, who in the 1970s proposed that no one aspect of the film medium (photographic production, specifically) is superior to its counterparts (such as artistic intention or soundtrack).

Noël Carroll is regarded as the most comprehensive critic of the theory. His argument, within 'Theorising the Moving Image,' holds that medium essentialism is an inaccurate way to evaluate a work – as it requires the distillation of a film to one medium, when a film is constituted by not one, but several mediums. These mediums may include editing, lighting, narrative, photography, colour, and artistic intention. The notion of a film as not containing one medium but several, can be interpreted in any number of ways, with some defining medium as an artist's intention and photography, others by audio editing, narrative, and artistic intention. Carroll takes issue with the presumptions held by medium essentialism, that each artform holds a unique medium, that that medium determines an arform's essence, and that an artform's content is determined by that medium. Carroll argues that theorists must "forget the medium" to understand the aesthetic possibilities that film contains, and criticises the essentialist arguments of works such as Siegfried Kracauer's 'Theory of Film', which avoided an exploration of the essence of film, yet still was preoccupied with a film-specific aesthetic as a result of the film medium, and nothing else.

Similarly, Robert Sinnerbrink within 'New Philosophies of Film: Thinking Images' argues that a film contains a multitude of elements, whilst medium essentialism requires a single, prescriptive and rigid one. Drawing from Cinema 1: The Movement Image, which was the first published consolidation of film theory, Sinnerbrink proposes that each film's "movement-image" or how a figure is created through the continuity of their movement, is that which defines it, in combination with a number of other elements. This position, therefore, denounces the idea that an artform's essence is determined by one specific medium. Citing the example of Derek Jarman's Blue (1993), Sinnerbrink argues that the film's engaging voiceover narration, effective use of colour, exciting background music and plot cannot be distilled into a single 'relevant medium'.

Jacques Rancière is also a critic of medium essentialism, proposing that no film has an essence particular to its medium, and that any essence or single medium cannot be determined by any film in cinematic history. Reiterating the unsolvable conflict between 'visual spectacle' and 'narrative content' faced by critics when attempting to distill film into a single essential medium, Rancière states that 'essentialising' the film medium often comes at the price of being unable to see the film as a whole, as a 'corpus'.
