= Non-essentialism =

Non-belief in an essence of things

Non-essentialism is a philosophical position which states that "things" (including but not limited to ideas, inanimate objects, living beings, and purported religious or metaphysical entities) do not contain an inherent essence that is inseparable from their being.

Fundamentally, the concept of non-essentialism is the opposite of essentialism, and may be considered similar to the concept of anti-foundationalism. Non-essentialism might also be defined cataphatically (i.e. affirmatively; see cataphatic theology) as the belief that for any entity, there are no specific traits or ground of being which entities of that kind must possess to be considered "that entity."

Non-essentialism is not restricted to general philosophical speculation. It is also found in academic disciplines such as sociology, anthropology, theology, history/historiography and science. How non-essentialism is used in these discourses varies given their different content and subject matter.

== Criticism ==
Edward Feser describes the position as not only untenable logically but psychologically impossible. In his book Aristotle's Revenge he argues that one cannot say the universe essentially does not have an essence without violating the Law of noncontradiction.

== See also ==
- Accidentalism (philosophy) – Philosophical rejection of causal closure of physical determinism
- Adiaphora
- Anatta
- Antinaturalism
- Essentialism
- Existentialism
- Nominalism
- Object-oriented ontology
- Social constructionism
- Structuralism
