= Punisher in other media =

Appearances of Punisher in cinema, television and video games

Adaptations of Punisher in other media
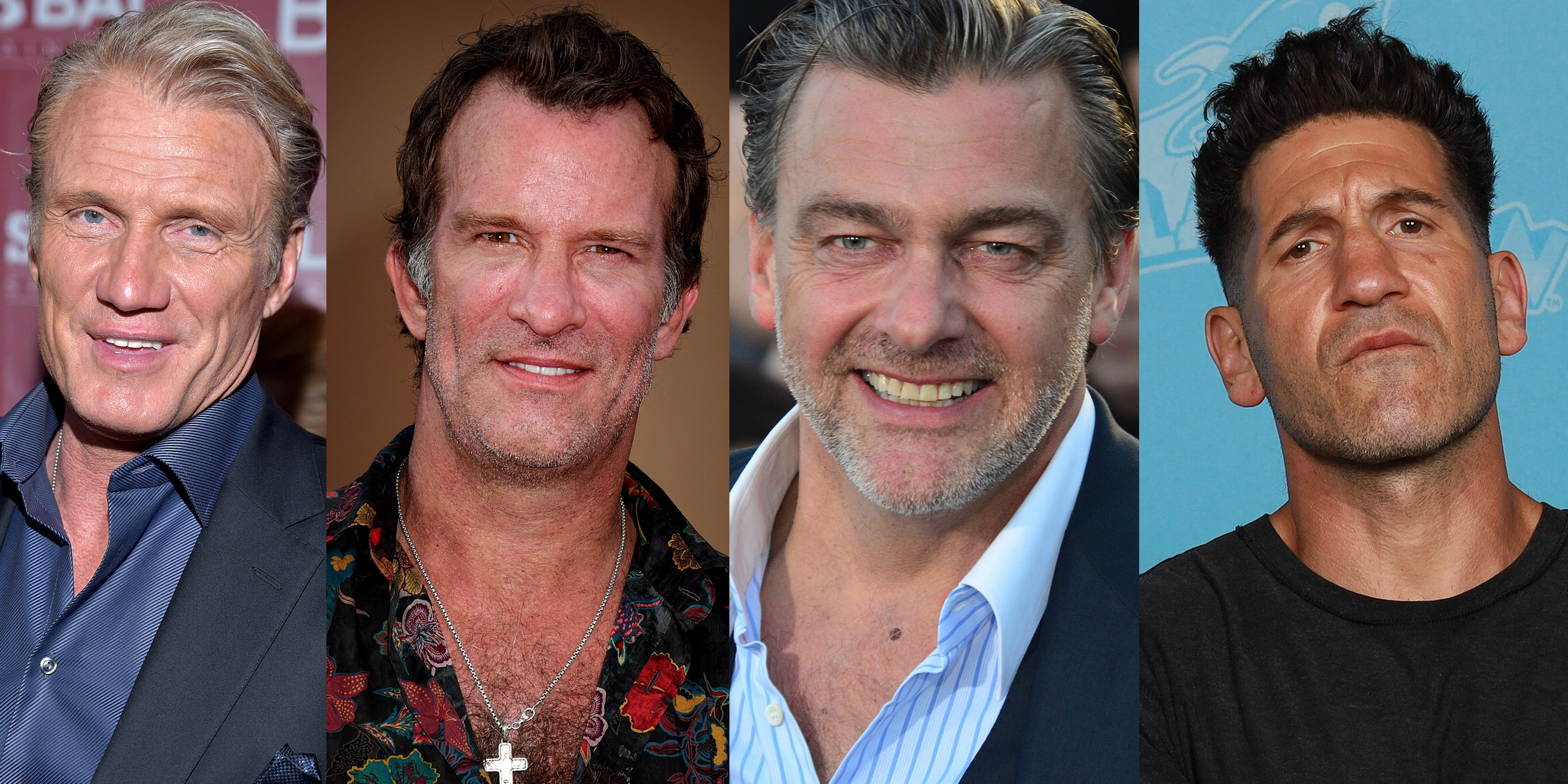
- The actors that have portrayed the Punisher in live action: Dolph Lundgren, Thomas Jane, Ray Stevenson, and Jon Bernthal
- Original source: Comics published by Marvel Comics
- First appearance: The Amazing Spider-Man #129 (February 1974)

Print publications
- Novel(s): The Punisher (2004)

Films and television
- Film(s): The Punisher (1989); The Punisher (2004); Punisher: War Zone (2008); Avengers Confidential: Black Widow & Punisher (2014)
- Television show(s): The Punisher (2017-2019); The Punisher: One Last Kill (2026)

Audio presentations
- Soundtrack(s): The Punisher (1989); The Punisher: The Album (2004); Original Score from the Motion Picture The Punisher (2004); Punisher: War Zone Original Motion Picture Soundtrack (2008); Punisher: War Zone Original Motion Picture Score (2008)

Games
- Video game(s): The Punisher (NES) (1990); The Punisher (computer) (1990); The Punisher: The Ultimate Payback! (1991); The Punisher (1993); The Punisher (2005); The Punisher: No Mercy (2009)

Frank Castle / The Punisher, a vigilante antihero created by Marvel Comics, has appeared in various mediums of media. Since the character's creation in 1974, he has appeared in films, television, and video games. The character, and his symbol have featured on products and merchandise.

== Films ==
=== Live-action ===
- The Punisher appears in a self-titled film (1989), portrayed by Dolph Lundgren.
- The Punisher appears in a self-titled film (2004), portrayed by Thomas Jane.
- The Punisher appears in Punisher: War Zone (2008), portrayed by Ray Stevenson.

=== Animation ===
- The Punisher appears in Iron Man: Rise of Technovore, voiced by Norman Reedus.
- The Punisher appears in Avengers Confidential: Black Widow & Punisher, voiced by Brian Bloom.

== Television ==
- The Punisher appears in Spider-Man: The Animated Series, voiced by John Beck. Due to the requirements for children's programming, this version wields non-lethal weaponry, such as concussive energy weapons and electrified net launchers.
- A robotic duplicate of the Punisher makes a non-speaking appearance in the X-Men: The Animated Series episode "Mojovision" as one of Mojo's fighters.
- The Punisher makes a cameo appearance in The Super Hero Squad Show episode "Night in the Sanctorum!", voiced by Ray Stevenson. This version wields non-lethal weaponry, such as lasers.
- An alternate timeline variant of Frank Castle who became a member of the Defenders makes a cameo appearance in the Avengers Assemble episode "Planet Doom".
- A Punisher manga appears in the Hit-Monkey episode "The Code".
- The Punisher appears in Lego Marvel Avengers: Mission Demolition, voiced by Roger Craig Smith.

== Marvel Cinematic Universe ==
Frank Castle appears in the Marvel Cinematic Universe, portrayed by Jon Bernthal:

- Castle appears in the second season of Daredevil (2016).
- Castle appears in both seasons of The Punisher (2017–2019), a spin-off series from Daredevil.
- Castle appears in the first season of Daredevil: Born Again (2025), a revival and continuation of Daredevil.
- Castle appears in The Punisher: One Last Kill (2026), a television special as a part of the Marvel Television Special Presentations.
- Castle appears in the film Spider-Man: Brand New Day (2026).

== Video games ==
- The Punisher appears in a self-titled NES game (1990).
- The Punisher appears in a self-titled Paragon Software game (1990).
- The Punisher appears in The Punisher: The Ultimate Payback!.
- The Punisher appears in a self-titled video game (1993).
- The Punisher appears in Spider-Man, voiced by Daran Norris.
- The Punisher appears in a self-titled video game (2005), voiced by Thomas Jane.
- The Punisher appears in The Punisher: No Mercy.
- The Punisher appears in LittleBigPlanet via the "Marvel Costume Kit 4" DLC.
- The Punisher's Captain America costume appears as an alternate skin for Captain America in Marvel vs. Capcom 3.
- The Marvel Zombies incarnation of the Punisher makes a cameo appearance in Frank West's ending in Ultimate Marvel vs. Capcom 3.
- The Punisher appears as an unlockable playable character in Marvel Super Hero Squad Online, voiced by Crispin Freeman.
- The Punisher appears as an unlockable playable character in Marvel Avengers Alliance.
- The Punisher appears as an unlockable playable character in Marvel Heroes, voiced by Marc Worden.
- The Punisher appears as an unlockable playable character in Lego Marvel Super Heroes, voiced by Robin Atkin Downes.
- The Punisher appears in Marvel Avengers Academy, voiced by James Arnold Taylor. This version is initially an associate of the Kingpin.
- The Punisher appears as an unlockable playable character in Marvel Puzzle Quest.
- The Punisher appears as an unlockable playable character in Marvel Contest of Champions.
- The Punisher appears as an unlockable playable character in Marvel: Future Fight.
- The Punisher appears as a playable character in Marvel Ultimate Alliance 3: The Black Order, voiced again by Brian Bloom. He is available via the "Marvel Knights: Curse of the Vampire" DLC.
- The Punisher appears as a playable character in Marvel Strike Force.
- The Punisher appears as a playable character in Marvel Rivals.
- The Cosmic Ghost Rider variant of Punisher appears as a playable character in Marvel Cosmic Invasion, voiced by Brian Bloom.

== Miscellaneous ==
- The Punisher appears in the self-titled 2004 film's novelization.
- The Punisher appears in The Amazing Spider-Man.
- The Punisher appears in Marvel Superheroes: What the--?!.
- The Punisher appears in the prose novel adaptation of Civil War.
- Punisher received a figure in HeroClix's collectible miniatures game.
- Punisher was announced for the Marvel Crisis Protocol miniatures game.
