= Punisher (disambiguation) =

The Punisher (Frank Castle) is a Marvel comic book character.

Punisher or the Punisher may also refer to:

== Marvel Comics "The Punisher" franchise ==
=== Characters ===
- Lynn Michaels, a character who briefly used the alias, from the Marvel Comics main 616 universe

=== Comic books ===
- Punisher (comic book), a comic book title mostly starring the Frank Castle character
  - Punisher (1995 series), first series of the title
  - Punisher (2009 series), second series of the title
- The Punisher (comic book), a comic book title mostly starring the Frank Castle character

=== Video games ===
- The Punisher (1991 NES video game), a 1991 video game based on the Marvel Comics character
- The Punisher (1990 computer game), a 1990 computer game based on the Marvel Comics character
- The Punisher (1993 video game), a 1993 arcade game based on the Marvel Comics character
- The Punisher (2005 video game), a 2005 video game based on the Marvel Comics character

=== Films ===
- The Punisher (1989 film), a 1989 film based on the Marvel Comics character (in main role: Dolph Lundgren)
- The Punisher (2004 film), a 2004 film based on the Marvel Comics character (in main role: Thomas Jane)
- The Punisher: War Zone, a 2008 film based on the Marvel Comics character (in main role: Ray Stevenson)

=== Music ===
- The Punisher (1989 score), the score from the 1989 film
- The Punisher (2004 score), the score from the 2004 film
- The Punisher: The Album, the album for the 2004 film

=== Television ===
- The Punisher (TV series), an American web series based on the Marvel Comics character
  - The Punisher: One Last Kill, an American television special, sequel to the series

== Other entertainment ==
- Punisher (1968 film), a Soviet drama film
- Punisher (album), by Phoebe Bridgers, 2020
- "Punisher", a song by K.Flay from Mono, 2023
- "Punisher", a song by Veil of Maya from Eclipse, 2012
- Punisher (Galactus), a robot in the service of the Marvel comic book character Galactus
- The Punisher, a character on the Canadian YTV game show Uh Oh!

== Military ==
- Punisher (drone), a small Ukrainian unmanned aircraft used to defend against the 2022 Russian invasion
- XM25 CDTE, a grenade launcher, also known as the Punisher

== People ==
=== Nickname ===
- Andre Agassi (born 1970), American tennis player
- Aristides Aquino (born 1994), Dominican outfielder for the Cincinnati Reds
- Big Pun (1971–2000), American rapper
- Cathal Pendred (born 1987), American-born Irish actor and former mixed martial artist
- Rodrigo Duterte (born 1945), Filipino politician
- Marek Piotrowski (born 1964), Polish mixed martial artist
- Ramazan Ramazanov (born 1984), Russian mixed martial artist

=== Stagename ===
- The Punisher, former ring name of WWE wrestler The Undertaker (born 1965)
- The Punisher, alias of TNA wrestler Andrew Martin (1975–2009)
