= Lady Gorgon =

Fictional character in American comics

- Lady Gorgon on the cover of Franken-Castle #18 (23 June 2010); Art by Mike McKone and Morry Hollowell

Publication information
- Publisher: Marvel Comics
- First appearance: Punisher War Journal Vol. 2, #20 (August 2008)
- Created by: Matt Fraction; Rick Remender; Howard Chaykin

In-story information
- Full name: Tanya Adrian
- Species: Human
- Place of origin: Earth-616
- Team affiliations: The Hand
- Partnerships: Silhouette; Illumination
- Notable aliases: Maria Castle
- Abilities: Telepathy; Incapability of being observed through artificial means

Lady Gorgon (Tanya Adrian) is a supervillain appearing in American comic books published by Marvel Comics. Created by Matt Fraction, Rick Remender, and Howard Chaykin, the character made her first appearance in Punisher War Journal Vol. 2, #20 (August 2008). She is an enemy of the Punisher.

== Publication history ==
Lady Gorgon was introduced Punisher War Journal Vol. 2, #20-21, and reappeared in Franken-Castle #17-18, and Punisher: In the Blood #1-5.

== Fictional character biography ==
A Jōnin of the Hand, Lady Gorgon and her entourage are hired by Jigsaw to assassinate the Punisher for €50,000,000. After having a group of Hand ninja stalk and wound the Punisher, Gorgon and her two partners, Silhouette and Illumination, confront the vigilante, and declare their intent to kill him, and have their masters resurrect him as a servant of the Hand.

The ensuing battle between the Punisher and Gorgon is interrupted by S.H.I.E.L.D. operatives Domino, Silver Sable, and Valentina Allegra de Fontaine. While her allies combat the S.H.I.E.L.D. personnel, Gorgon pursues the Punisher into a flophouse, and draws him out into the open by using her telepathy to make him experience the death of a vagrant whose throat she slits. While overpowering the Punisher, Gorgon is attacked by Silver Sable; due to being distracted by Sable, Gorgon is shot in the head by the Punisher.

For failing to assassinate the Punisher, Gorgon was expelled from the Hand. In an attempt to reclaim her honor, Gorgon hires three members of the Shaolin Scientist Squad to help her murder the Punisher, who had since become a Frankenstein's monster-like entity called Franken-Castle. Franken-Castle kills two of the Shaolin Scientist Squad members, while the third is shot in the head from afar by Gorgon to prevent him from being interrogated by Franken-Castle. Gorgon retreats to Tokyo, where she acquires the Izanami-no-Mikoto Sword, a Hand relic that she believes can earn her acceptance back into the organization. Franken-Castle locates Gorgon, and their ensuing battle brings them to the Hand's base in Kabukichō, where Gorgon is impaled with the Izanami-no-Mikoto Sword by her former master, Kazu Yoshiokya.

Gorgon again survived, and was approached by Jigsaw and Stuart Clarke, who she allowed to alter her appearance and characteristics (like her voice) so that she could pose as Maria Castle as a part of a plot to kill the Punisher. Gorgon psychologically tortures the Punisher by pretending to be Maria, and later tries to kill him with a flamethrower in Jigsaw's lair. The Punisher surrenders, unable to fight what he believes to be his wife, until he is informed by his ally, Henry, that the woman is an imposter. In a rage, the Punisher beats and stabs Gorgon to death, while she taunts him by saying, "Guess you figured it out. Gotta wonder... you could be so easily fooled. Gotta wonder how much you even remember her now? All these years later...

== Powers and abilities ==
Gorgon is a telepath capable of controlling minds, reading thoughts, and linking minds together, the latter being a skill she utilizes in combat by forcing opponents to experience the emotions, pain, and deaths of others. The character is also depicted as being proficient with blades and firearms, and is incapable of being observed through artificial means, such as satellite imaging.
