= The Punisher: The Ultimate Payback! =

1991 video game

- Developer: Beam Software
- Publisher: Acclaim Entertainment
- Designers: Gregg Barnett; Rod Richards
- Programmer: Rod Richards
- Artists: Tony G. Pentland; Eve Marks
- Composers: Gavan Anderson; Tania Smith
- Series: The Punisher
- Platform: Game Boy
- Release: NA: July 1991
- Genre: Shoot 'em up
- Mode: Single-player

The Punisher: The Ultimate Payback! is a 1991 shoot 'em up video game for the Game Boy, based on the Marvel Comics antihero the Punisher. The game, developed by Beam Software and published by Acclaim Entertainment, is a revised version of the 1991 NES game The Punisher, featuring cameo appearances from Spider-Man and the final boss being switched from Kingpin to Jigsaw.

== Plot ==
The game begins with Spider-Man telling Punisher that a drug lord is hiding in a mall and that he has to get him. Frank Castle shoots villains while protecting the innocent. Spider-Man appears between the action to offer advice on how to beat upcoming levels and swings in to rescue hostages once their captors have been shot.

At the end of the game when Jigsaw realizes that The Punisher is going to kill him, Castle says, "Penance is good for the soul, but punishment is good for the guilty".

== Gameplay ==
The player controls Frank Castle (the Punisher) from an over-the-shoulder third-person perspective through various New York City locations, shooting thugs and battling enemies such as Hitman, Colonel Kliegg, Sijo Kanaka, and Assassin as bosses. The final boss is Jigsaw. Power-ups can be obtained by shooting them onscreen and include extra ammunition, a med kit, kevlar, a machine gun, a bazooka, and grenades.

== Reception ==
Blair Farrell of Comic Gamers Assemble criticized the game for removing the player's ability to move the Punisher across the screen but understood it was due to the size of the screen. He stated that the game is relatively short and difficult, and that Spider-Man's appearances did not make sense for the character considering that he would never aid the Punisher in killing his enemies. He said the game is overall very inferior to the NES version but has the advantage of separate soundtracks for each level.

Other reviewers have criticized the game for having very light player assistance and few health drops but that it is still relatively entertaining. Others commented on straying from the source comics.

== See also ==
- Marvel Games
