= Microchip (comics) =

Marvel Comics character

- Microchip on the cover of The Punisher: The Origin of Microchip #1 (July 1993). Art by Art Nichols and Doug Braithwaite.

Publication information
- Publisher: Marvel Comics
- First appearance: The Punisher #4 (Nov. 1987)
- Created by: Mike Baron; Klaus Janson

In-story information
- Full name: David Linus Lieberman
- Species: Human
- Place of origin: Earth
- Team affiliations: Hood's Crime Syndicate
- Partnerships: Punisher; Carlos Cruz; Mickey Fondozzi
- Supporting character of: Punisher
- Notable aliases: Micro; Cringe; Lowell Bartholomew Ori
- Abilities: Hacker; Mechanic; Weapons expert Genius-level intellect Expert marksmanship

David Linus Lieberman (often known as Microchip or Micro) is a fictional character appearing in American comic books published by Marvel Comics. He was an ally of The Punisher for many years and assisted the Punisher by building weapons, supplying technology, hacking into computers, and providing friendship. Microchip gradually evolved from the Punisher's friend to a bitter enemy after their final falling out.

Micro was portrayed by Wayne Knight in the film Punisher: War Zone (2008) and by Ebon Moss-Bachrach in the first season of the television series The Punisher (2017).

== Publication history ==
Microchip first appeared in The Punisher vol. 2 #4 (Nov. 1987) and was created by Mike Baron and Klaus Janson.

The character was inspired by Q from the James Bond series of novels and films.

== Fictional character biography ==
David Lieberman, also known as Microchip or simply Micro, is a legendary computer hacker in the early days of the Internet, performing numerous scams and hacks still held in awe by his peers. A scam brings him too close to criminals, forcing him to retire and become a businessman. This ends when his nephew, attempting to follow in his footsteps, is caught and killed after accidentally hacking into the private computers of the Kingpin. While personally investigating his nephew's murder, Lieberman meets and starts collaborating with the Punisher (Frank Castle). Microchip's help proved invaluable to Castle: he served not just as a hacker and cyber-investigator, but provided him with invaluable services, such as managing and laundering his finances, establishing and maintaining Castle's safehouses, helping Castle train in more "specialized" skills for his war on crime, and obtaining hard-to-get ammunition and equipment. Less obsessed with Castle's personal war, Microchip also acts as a de facto counselor to Castle (e.g., encouraging Castle to take occasional vacations and breaks, to avoid burn-out or losing his mind).

Over time, more of his past history is revealed. His father had been forced to create weapons against his will years before Micro was born; in the same issue he mentions his sister is a happy housewife in Ft. Lauderdale. Micro has an illegitimate son named Louis Frohike, who winds up getting killed while trying to assist the Punisher in a hostage exchange.

One issue that dealt primarily with Micro was when Castle massacres a street gang running drugs, but a dealer named Jamal Jones survives. Micro warns Frank that Jones is hospitalized under heavy police protection and takes it upon himself to infiltrate the hospital through different disguises, first dressing as a telephone lineman and then a reporter under the pseudonym Linus Schultz, so he could contact Jones with a message that the Punisher wants the name of his drug connection or he'll come back to finish the job. A slight insight to his wish to have a life outside of crime-fighting occurs when Micro thinks about a brief meeting with a nurse and how even a casual encounter with a woman causes him to recognize that he spends "too much time with Frank and his 'war'".

The Punisher's 1992 spin-off entitled The Punisher War Zone, written by Chuck Dixon and penciled by John Romita, Jr., provided further development for Micro. The first issues describe his growing disillusionment with the Punisher's crusade, with Micro going so far as to see a psychiatrist and take up acting in an attempt to deal with his frustration. After Castle discovers this, the two have a disagreement and Micro goes into hiding, working as a barman.

Micro develops a friendship with Mickey Fondozzi, a repentant Mafia soldier whom Frank recruits to his side. The two work on operations together, such as infiltrating the Secret Empire, a multi-faceted criminal organization. After the Punisher is seemingly killed in a failed ambush of an underworld meeting, the two find themselves literally on the street, their vehicle surrounded by police. When Micro refuses to help Fondozzi blast his way through the cops to escape, the latter abandons him.

Ultimately, Castle and Micro have one final fallout just before the cancellation of all three major Punisher titles in 1995. This fight comes to an end in the closing issues of The Punisher War Journal. Micro disagrees with Castle's increasingly violent methods, feeling that Castle has lost sight of their original goals and has gone too far for even him to tolerate. He decides to recruit a new "Punisher" to replace Castle, former Navy SEAL Carlos Cruz. Micro and Castle come face to face in one of Micro's safehouses in what appears to be a final confrontation. This battle is interrupted by rogue S.H.I.E.L.D. agent Derek Smalls, who had been part of a program to take down vigilantes like Castle before becoming a vigilante himself. Smalls fires a rocket into the safe house, apparently killing Micro.

In the Civil War Files comic, just before the "Civil War" storyline was published, Iron Man talked about events in the Punisher's past from the Marvel Knights and MAX comics, which indicated that it did happen in the mainstream Marvel Universe at some point, meaning that the CIA drug trafficking and Punisher killing Micro in the MAX series is also considered canonical to Earth-616.

During the 2008 - 09 "Dark Reign" storyline, Hood brings Microchip back from the dead and offers to bring his son back to life if he helps in dealing with the Punisher. To start off Hood's revival ritual of Castle's and Microchip's family, Microchip kills G.W. Bridge. The death of Bridge succeeds in reanimating the corpses, but the Punisher, believing that his family is not actually present, forces Firebrand to destroy the bodies, then kills him.

In the Punisher: In the Blood mini-series, the Punisher returns to New York City and vows to find Micro and make him pay for murdering G.W. Bridge. Micro is shown being knocked unconscious by Jigsaw. While being held captive in Jigsaw's warehouse hideout, he is visited by Stuart Clarke, an old ally of the Punisher. Clarke explains that his girlfriend died at the Punisher's hand and that he swore to make him pay only to see his revenge failed. Clarke walks away warning Micro that the Punisher is coming. When the Punisher is captured, Jigsaw allows him to kill Micro by slashing his throat.

Hood's demonic forces revive Microchip again. He has been forced to work as a tech asset for Kingpin, who uses Microchip to access and manipulate Punisher's consciousness. Microchip ended up releasing Punisher. When Microchip was given a second chance, he and Punisher began working together again.

== Powers and abilities ==
Microchip is an expert hacker, mechanic, and weapons expert. He also possesses genius-level intellect. Microchip is also an expert marksman.

== Other versions ==
=== Crossovers ===
Microchip accompanies the Punisher to Riverdale in Archie Meets the Punisher, and to Gotham City in Punisher and Batman; in the latter, he is narrowly bested by Robin in a "hacking duel".

=== Marvel MAX ===
In the Punisher: MAX universe, Microchip has been presumed dead for some time. However, he returns to attempt to pressure Castle into working for the CIA's black ops unit to participate in the hunt for terrorists. The Punisher declines, as he prefers his autonomy to indentured service to an institution such as the government. Microchip confesses to Castle that the source of funding for the operation came from the CIA funneling arms and heroin out of Afghanistan. Castle gives Micro a chance he has not given his victims since before he officially assumed the role of the Punisher: the chance to run. Microchip declines, obligated to help Castle in a CIA/Mafia firefight. Taking a possibly mortal injury in the fight, Micro attempts to humanize Castle again, only to be met with a point-blank shotgun round to the head.

=== Punisher Kills the Marvel Universe ===
An alternate universe version of Microchip appears in Punisher Kills the Marvel Universe. This version is a former member of the United States Air Force who was "kicked out" after Doctor Octopus ripped his legs off. He is partnered with the Punisher by Kesselring, a superhuman-hating multi-millionaire who has convinced the Punisher to kill all the world's heroes and villains.

=== Space: Punisher ===
Microchip's equivalent is Chip, a robot the Punisher built to aid him in his vendetta against the Six-Fingered Hand. When the Punisher confronts a group of renegade Watchers, the true leaders of the Six-Fingered Hand, the entities destroy Chip. The Punisher is able to escape with Chip's severed head, who is revealed to be modeled after his murdered son.

=== What If? Age of Ultron ===
In What If?: Age of Ultron, Microchip appears as a member of Nick Fury's Defenders, a group consisting of Earth's remaining non-powered heroes who are holed up in Latveria's Castle Doom. Microchip and the other Defenders, sans Fury and Black Widow, sacrifice themselves in a kamikaze attack against the Midgard Serpent, giving Black Widow the opportunity to acquire Mjolnir, become the new Thor, and kill the Serpent.

== In other media ==
=== Television ===
Ebon Moss-Bachrach as Micro in the television series The Punisher

- Microchip appears in Spider-Man: The Animated Series, voiced by Robert Axelrod. This version goes by "Chip" and serves as the Punisher's conscience, urging him to use non-lethal weaponry.
- David "Micro" Lieberman appears in the first season of The Punisher (2017), portrayed by Ebon Moss-Bachrach. This version is a former NSA analyst and family man who was framed for whistleblowing on the clandestine black-ops activities of the CIA and Frank Castle's unit in the Middle East during the war on terror. After surviving an assassination attempt by Castle's superiors US Marine Colonel Ray Schoonover and CIA Director William Rawlins, Lieberman goes into hiding in an abandoned factory and contacts Castle for help in exonerating himself. While working together, the pair develop a strained and vitriolic partnership but eventually become close friends. After they succeed, Lieberman returns to his family and retires from vigilantism.

=== Film ===
- Microchip was included in one of Michael France's early drafts for The Punisher (2004). However, the character was excised from the final film at the insistence of director and co-writer Jonathan Hensleigh, who noted, "There are a couple of years where I didn't want to go; Microchip, the battle van, all that stuff where it got really high-tech; we're not going there at all. I deemed that too complicated, too lacking of the spirit of the sort of urban vigilante".
- Microchip appears in Punisher: War Zone (2008), portrayed by Wayne Knight. After the Punisher accidentally kills undercover NYPD agent Nicky Donatelli, Jigsaw and "Loony Bin Jim" learn of Microchip, kill his mother, and kidnap him along with Nicky's wife Angela Donatelli and their daughter Grace to lure the Punisher into a trap. After the Punisher kills Jim, Jigsaw kills Microchip.

=== Video games ===
- Microchip provides mission briefings in The Punisher (1990).
- Microchip appears on the "Continue Screen" of The Punisher (1993), giving the eponymous character CPR.
- Microchip appears in Spider-Man (2000), voiced by Christopher Corey Smith.
- Microchip appears as a playable character in The Punisher: No Mercy.
- Microchip appears in Marvel: Avengers Alliance. This version serves as the driver of the Punisher's Battle Van.
