= Punisher: War Zone (score) =

Punisher: War Zone – Original Motion Picture Score

Film score by Michael Wandmacher
- Released: December 14, 2008
- Genre: Orchestral
- Length: 48:49
- Label: Lionsgate Records

Punisher: War Zone – Original Motion Picture Score is the official score to the 2008 film Punisher: War Zone. It was composed entirely by Michael Wandmacher and released by Lionsgate Records.

== Track list ==
All tracks are written by Michael Wandmacher.

No.	Title	Length
1.	"Main Titles"	3:03
2.	"Lights On!"	1:10
3.	"The Burden"	2:16
4.	"Rich in Mercy"	1:05
5.	"Death of the Loved"	1:25
6.	"Infiltrate and Destroy"	2:49
7.	"This Is Ground Zero"	2:10
8.	"A Pretty Face"	2:21
9.	"The Russians"	3:10
10.	"A Call to Arms"	1:16
11.	"Safe Harbor"	1:26
12.	"A Wish for Death"	2:53
13.	"Freeze!"	1:09
14.	"Two Berettas"	2:00
15.	"I Want My Applesauce Back"	2:37
16.	"Held Hostage"	3:19
17.	"Joyful Mayhem"	2:55
18.	"Let the Games Begin"	4:24
19.	"LBJ"	1:46
20.	"Let Me Put You Out of My Misery"	4:11
21.	"Aftermath"	1:33
Total length:		48:49

== Personnel ==
- Michael Wandmacher, composer
- Susie Bench, orchestra conductor and orchestrator
- Tony Blondal, additional orchestrator
- Peter Boyer, orchestrator
- Mark Curry, score mixer
- Jay Faires, music supervisor
- Danniel Hubbert, music supervisor
- Joshua Winget, music editor
- Elliott Goldkind, assistant music editor

== Production ==
The score was composed by Michael Wandmacher who described himself as a big fan of the character of the character Frank Castle.

INTERVIEWER: How familiar were you with the Punisher comics before taking the job? WANDMACHER: Very familiar. Like I-could-go-on-a-gameshow-and-win-money-answering-Punisher-questions familiar. I've followed the exploits of Frank Castle since he teamed up with The Jackal in Spider-Man #129 back in 1974. Since then, there have been many incarnations of The Punisher, be it in "War Journal", "War Zone", the regular series' in the 80s and 90s, all the way to the current MAX label. I've read and collected them all. Some of the best one-offs and crossovers in all of Marvel's history are focused on The Punisher.

He has stated that his main focus throughout the making of the score was creating a definitive musical identity for The Punisher, that the character needed something dark, relentless and muscular, but something which also didn't make the audience forget Castle's humanity, his personal torment and deep sadness. He stated that he approached the job equally as a fan and as a composer. Believing that that angle helped tremendously when trying to sort out what to keep and what to scrap.

After completing a cue I would ask myself as a fan if the music was working. If so, it stayed in the score. At the end of the process, I had something that I knew was true to The Punisher in every sense. His theme, especially, is equal parts stoic, forceful, dark and mournful.

He also stated that showcasing Castle as flawed and humane, was critical to the score.

If the audience simply perceives Frank as a machine, they'll lose interest and certainly won't give his M.O. the benefit of the doubt. This all led to using a rather sizable orchestra (70+ with strings and brass only), a minimum of clearly defined themes and a set of motifs that could highlight critical emotional moments in the story. You'll find throughout the score that primary melodies are focused, straightforward and highly versatile - just like The Punisher. Because he's a "comic book" hero, it also gives license to use a strong thematic approach. I wanted to capitalize on that. Too few films like this have a melody you can hum on the way out of the theater. This one does.

Wandmacher has said that he wanted to avoid making the score have a too "military" sound to it as he felt that it would be perceived as either cliché or campy.

== Reception ==
Liz Ferraris of Soundtrack.net stated that Wandmacher's score both reflected the ominous tone of the film and skillfully brought out a necessary lightness to the heavy plot and that the percussion beats were reminiscent of war drums and echoed throughout, as the characters struggle against each other. She also points out that at times, Wandmacher relied on string and woodwind instruments, resulting in a melancholy like sound.

Although the score is mostly symphonic, Wandmacher does include some of his signature electronic sounds, all along creating seamless transitions between the varying elements.

— Ferraris.

Roger Ebert described the music as "elevator music if the elevator were in a death plunge".
