= List of video games featuring the Punisher =

Games featuring Marvel Comics fictional character

The Marvel Comics anti-hero the Punisher has made several appearances on numerous electronic and gaming platforms.

== Standalone games ==
=== The Punisher (1990 computer game) ===
Also in 1990, MicroProse produced a Punisher video game for MS-DOS and Amiga. It has three modes of gameplay: driving the Punisher's "Battle Van", walking through NYC's streets and select buildings, and scuba diving.

=== The Punisher (1991 NES game) ===
A Punisher game for the Nintendo Entertainment System was published by LJN Toys in 1991. The player controls the Punisher character from an over-the-shoulder perspective through various New York City locations, shooting thugs and battling supervillains as bosses (the final boss was the Kingpin).

A Game Boy conversion was published in 1992. It plays in a manner similar to Operation Wolf and has a cameo appearance by Spider-Man. The Kingpin was the final boss in all versions except for Game Boy, which used Jigsaw.

=== The Punisher: The Ultimate Payback! (1991 GB game) ===
A Game Boy game with Jigsaw as the main villain and cameos from Spider-Man.

=== The Punisher (1993 arcade game) ===
A coin-operated arcade video game titled The Punisher was released in 1993 by Capcom. The game is a side-scrolling beat-'em-up in the vein of Capcom's Final Fight, where the player can control the Punisher or Nick Fury on their quest to kill The Kingpin, and would engage various foes in hand-to-hand combat, occasionally drawing firearms in lieu of melee combat. A home conversion developed by Sculptured Software was released for the Mega Drive/Genesis in 1994.

=== The Punisher (2005 game) ===
In 2004, a violent Punisher action game designed for adult players was released by Volition, Inc. Players take control of the vigilante hero to track down criminals and make them pay for their deeds. The game's story is a loose mixture of the 2004 film, as well as the 2000 mini-series, Welcome Back, Frank, written by Garth Ennis and pencilled by Steve Dillon, wherein the character has no aversion to committing acts of extreme violence. Thomas Jane, who portrayed the title role in the 2004 Punisher film also provides the voice of The Punisher in the game.

=== The Punisher: No Mercy (2009 game) ===
A PlayStation 3 Punisher game was developed by Zen Studios and released by Sony Computer Entertainment on July 2, 2009, for PlayStation 3. The game includes many characters from the comics such as Nick Fury, Dum Dum Dugan, Outlaw, and Yelena Belova.

== Related games ==
=== Playable appearances ===
- The Punisher appeared as an unlockable playable character in Marvel Avengers Alliance.
- The Punisher appeared as an unlockable playable character in Marvel Heroes, voiced by Marc Worden.
- The Punisher appears as an unlockable playable character in Lego Marvel Super Heroes, voiced by Robin Atkin Downes.
- The Punisher appeared in Marvel Avengers Academy, voiced by James Arnold Taylor. He was first featured as an antagonist, fighting with Kingpin. He could later be recruited after his defeat during the "Daredevil" event.
- The Punisher appears as an unlockable playable character in Marvel Puzzle Quest.
- The Punisher appears as an unlockable playable character in Marvel Contest of Champions.
- The Punisher appears as an unlockable playable character in Marvel Future Fight.
- The Punisher appears as an unlockable playable character in Marvel Ultimate Alliance 3: The Black Order. He is available through the DLC "Marvel Knights: Curse of the Vampire".
- The Punisher appears as a playable character in Marvel Rivals, voiced by Bill Millsap.
- The Cosmic Ghost Rider variant of Punisher appears as a playable character in Marvel Cosmic Invasion, voiced by Brian Bloom.

=== Non-playable appearances ===
- The Punisher appears in Spider-Man. In it, the Punisher helps Spider-Man find Mysterio's secret hideout in Warehouse 65. He offers to help, but Spider-Man declines, stating he wants to "keep the body-count low". The Punisher is seen again in the last scene of the game playing cards with Spider-Man, Captain America and Daredevil. This is slightly humorous, as the Punisher does not usually fraternize with anyone, let alone known superheroes. The Punisher's voice was provided by Daran Norris.
- The Punisher is mentioned in Marvel Nemesis: Rise of the Imperfects. A reporter mistakenly claims that the Punisher is "missing in action". A torn piece of cloth from his trademark "skull" can be seen hanging on a post over a large chain gun in the cinematic opening.
- The Punisher is mentioned in Marvel Ultimate Alliance 2. During a conversation between Captain America and Luke Cage, the player talks about why the Punisher was not recruited onto the Anti-Reg side.
- The Punisher's costume is available as part of the DLC "Marvel Costume Kit 4" of LittleBigPlanet.
- The Punisher's Captain America costume appears as an alternate costume for Captain America in Marvel vs. Capcom 3: Fate of Two Worlds.
- A zombified version of The Punisher makes a cameo in Frank West's ending in Ultimate Marvel vs. Capcom 3.

== See also ==
- Marvel Games
