= Rev (comics) =

- The Rev in The Punisher Vol. 2, #35 (July 1990); Art by Bill Reinhold

Publication information
- Publisher: Marvel Comics
- First appearance: The Punisher Vol. 2, #4 (November 1987)
- Created by: Mike Baron; Klaus Janson

In-story information
- Full name: Samuel Smith
- Species: Human
- Team affiliations: Church of the Saved
- Partnerships: Jigsaw
- Abilities: Healing

The Rev (Samuel Smith) is a supervillain appearing in American comic books published by Marvel Comics. Created by Mike Baron and Klaus Janson, the character made his first appearance in The Punisher Vol. 2, #4 (November 1987). He is an enemy of the Punisher.

== Publication history ==
The Rev was introduced in The Punisher Vol. 2, #4-5, and reappeared three years later in the same title, in a storyline that occurred in Issues #35 to #40. He also received a profile in Marvel Encyclopedia #5.

The character was based on Jim Jones, creator of the Peoples Temple.

== Fictional character biography ==
=== Church of the Saved ===
Samuel "the Rev" Smith was born in Terre Haute and, despite being an atheist, attained recognition due to his faith healing, and blend of socialism and religious fervor, which led to him founding the Church of the Saved in Bedford–Stuyvesant. As his congregation (which consisted primarily of downtrodden minorities) grew, the Rev prepared to move out of the "fascist, racist United States" and into Dutch Guiana.

When an arms dealer refuses to sell to him, the Rev has the man killed, which prompts the Punisher to infiltrate the Church of the Saved. The Punisher's first mission as a member of the cult sees the Rev ordering him and two others to obtain a videotape in the possession of an unstable reporter, who intends to create a documentary about the Church of the Saved. The Punisher (who acquires the tape, and keeps it for himself) is fatally shot by the deranged journalist, but is healed by the Rev. Afterward, the Punisher watches the tape, which shows the Rev murdering a man who had tried to leave the Church.

The Rev has everyone board a ship to "Smithtown" in Dutch Guiana, where he has the Punisher train the congregation in preparation for what the Rev claims will be an imminent attack by the United States. The Rev keeps the local authorities and government officials appeased with his harem, while he and his sister draw up plans to assassinate a visiting American congressman, and to poison their followers with potassium cyanide for a "revolutionary" mass suicide.

When he happens upon the Rev's second in-command executing alleged traitors, the Punisher makes his move, assaulting the Rev and his sister in their quarters. The Punisher shoots the Rev in the stomach, forces his sister to flee, and announces to the Church of the Saved that the Rev gave his life for them, and that it was his dying wish that they "work for change" back in the United States.

=== Venezuela ===
The Rev survived and, concluding that evil is more powerful than good, comes to worship Belasco, who he believes to be Lucifer, and the source of his powers. Establishing a base in a Tepui temple, the Rev enslaves a village, and forces the tribesmen to cultivate a rare plant that can be used to create a sterility-inducing drug. With the drug, Belasco intends to purge humanity, save for a few individuals, such as the Rev.

The Rev breaks Jigsaw (whose face he promises to heal) out of Ryker's Island, and places him in charge of a shipment of the drug that is to be tested in New York City. When the Punisher destroys the drug shipment, the Rev breaks into a suburban home, and stabs the family within to death in the name of Lucifer. After Jigsaw fails to kill the Punisher, he and the Rev travel to Tepui. Once in his temple, the Rev orders Jigsaw to shoot a disloyal slave, and to deal with the approaching Punisher.

Later, the Rev performs a ritual in which he severs and regrows his own limbs, an act witnessed by Jigsaw. The Rev is coerced at gunpoint to fix Jigsaw's face, and afterward they are confronted by a scarred Punisher, who kills Jigsaw. To prove his power, the Rev summons Belasco, who forces the Punisher to flee, pursued by Jigsaw, who was resurrected by the Rev. The Rev is then instructed by Belasco to dump the sterility drug into the Gulf Stream.

The Punisher defeats and re-scars Jigsaw, catches up with the Rev, forces him to heal his mangled face, and allows him to board a helicopter. When the Rev tries to shoot him from the helicopter, the Punisher blows it up with a planted bomb; as the vehicle goes down in flames, the Rev fruitlessly screams for help from Belasco.

== Powers and abilities ==
The Rev possessed healing powers, which he has had since childhood, that were extensive enough to regrow limbs, and resurrect the dead (though in that instance, he may have been assisted by Belasco). The source of his abilities are unrevealed; the Punisher speculated that the Rev was a mutant, while the Rev himself believed that his powers were demonic in nature, though in his final appearance he began questioning this.
