= Hitman (Marvel Comics) =

Hitman is the name of three fictional characters appearing in American comic books published by Marvel Comics.

== Publication history ==
Burt Kenyon first appeared in The Spectacular Spider-Man #4 (March 1977), and was created by Archie Goodwin and Sal Buscema. The character subsequently appears in The Amazing Spider-Man #174-175 (Nov.–Dec. 1977), in which he is killed. The character appears posthumously in the Punisher: Return to Big Nothing graphic novel (1989).

Jimmy Pierce first appeared in The Punisher vol. 2 #86 to serve as the Cullen crime family's Punisher. He was created by Steven Grant and Hugh Haynes.

== Fictional character biography ==
=== Burt Kenyon ===
Hitman

Publication information
- Publisher: Marvel Comics
- First appearance: The Spectacular Spider-Man #4 (March 1977)
- Created by: Archie Goodwin; Sal Buscema

In-story information
- Alter ego: Burt Kenyon
- Team affiliations: Maggia
- Abilities: Extraordinary marksman Use of military weapons

Burt Kenyon was a Vietnam veteran serving in the same company as Frank Castle, who would later become the Punisher. Kenyon saved Castle's life by killing several enemy soldiers and dragging Castle to safety after he was wounded in an ambush. Castle wanted to know how he could repay Kenyon, to which Kenyon replied that Castle should remember that he owed him a life.

As the Hitman, Kenyon was a costumed mercenary assassin. He was hired by the Maggia as their version of the Punisher. The Vulture had rejected the Maggia's offer before they hired the Hitman, so the Hitman was sent to humiliate the Vulture by killing Spider-Man before the Vulture could. The two villains fought over Spider-Man, allowing Spider-Man the chance to escape. The Hitman had placed tracers on the Vulture as well as Spider-Man, and he continued to harass and attack them both. While Spider-Man feigned weakness, the Hitman coerced the Vulture into attacking Spider-Man, but Spider-Man turned so that the Hitman shot the Vulture's power pack instead of Spider-Man. The Hitman fled and Spider-Man gave the tracer to the Punisher to give him the opportunity to track the Hitman down.

A terrorist group known as the People's Liberation Front (PLF) hired the Hitman to kidnap J. Jonah Jameson and kill him for editorials written about the group. While looking for the Hitman, the Punisher found himself battling the PLF. As the Hitman confronted Jameson in his office, he attracted the attention of the Punisher and Spider-Man. The Hitman escaped to the roof with Jameson as he fought Spider-Man, but Spider-Man followed him. Hitman managed to escape in his mini-copter despite the Punisher's efforts to shoot Hitman. One of Spider-Man's spider-tracers allowed them to track the Hitman to the Statue of Liberty, where the PLF hid Jameson inside and intended to blow him up along with the statue. The Punisher and Spider-Man arrived to stop the PLF, and confronted the Hitman. Spider-Man managed to rescue Jameson from the Hitman, and the Punisher shot Hitman, who fell from the statue but managed to grab part of the Statue of Liberty's crown and hang on. Spider-Man was also hanging from another part of the statue, but was wounded, weakening, and also holding on to Jameson with his other arm. Castle was momentarily torn between helping Spider-Man or Kenyon, especially when Kenyon reminded Castle that he owed him a life. Castle chose to help Spider-Man, telling Kenyon to hang on until he could get there. Kenyon declined, saying that he would never last and that Castle had already made his choice. He then said that while Castle had owed him a life, he never said that it had to be his (Kenyon's) life, and that by saving Spider-Man, they were now even. Kenyon then let go and plummeted to his death.

During the Dead No More: The Clone Conspiracy storyline, Hitman is resurrected in a clone body by Miles Warren and his company New U Technologies. Hitman survives the degenerative disorder that afflicts many of the other clones and becomes an enforcer for Countess Karkov of Symkaria, who deploys Hitman to assassinate Doctor Doom.

=== Jimmy Pierce ===
Hitman

Publication information
- Publisher: Marvel Comics
- First appearance: The Punisher vol. 2 #85 (December 1993)
- Created by: Steven Grant; Hugh Haynes

In-story information
- Alter ego: James "Jimmy" Pierce
- Notable aliases: Punisher, "Hitman Punisher"
- Abilities: Peak-level strength, speed and agility Uses a variety of firearms Wears Kevlar body armor

Jimmy Pierce is the son of Jack Pierce and Midge Cullen. His father resisted "Old Man" Peach Cullen's efforts to pull him into the Cullen crime family. Jack left to serve in the army.

After the war, Jack Pierce found a new woman where Peach Cullen and Midge killed him. Following his father's death, Jimmy kept himself distant from the Cullens. He served in the Special Forces and was also a former Golden Gloves boxing champion.

After Punisher was believed to be killed, Peach Cullen tried to force Jimmy into becoming the new Punisher that obeys his commands. Jimmy was resistant at first until Peach Cullen stated that he has his mother hostage. Jimmy ended up donning the costume that was complete with a mask.

Peach Cullen sent Jimmy to take down some rival operations where he believed that if word got out that Punisher was working for the Cullen family, they would own New York. Jimmy then busted up a crack house operation which Dean Swaybrick (AKA Yuppunisher) had targeted the same operation. This foiled Dean's publicity stunt.

Jimmy was sent to Laastekist, Pennsylvania to investigate the sightings of Punisher. While in Laastekist, Jimmy was disgusted when the other Cullen Family members shot and seemingly killed Payback and Lynn Michaels. Dean Swaybrick then arrived and killed the Cullen Family members present. Then Dean put the gun to Jimmy's head until Dean's fellow agents fled. This distraction gave Jimmy the opportunity to steal Dean's gun and shoot him. Jimmy was mortified after this and approached Dean's body. As Jimmy kneeled over Dean's corpse, he is shot in the back by Vigil's Blackwell and left for dead.

Jimmy later ambushed Dave Cullen and Duke Cullen where he forced them to tell him where Peach Cullen was hiding out. He then went to the apartment of his sister Lori Pierce. Lori's friend from medical school stitched up Jimmy's wound at Blackwell's hand. Dave Cullen and Duke Cullen tracked Jimmy to Lori's apartment and attacked him. Jimmy defeated Dave Cullen and Duke Cullen. As Jimmy took Dave with him, Duke was left tied up in Lori's apartment and was killed by Lori after Jimmy left. Jimmy sneaked into the meeting place of the Cullen family to rescue his mother. However, Midge smashed a coffee pot onto Jimmy's head and was at the mercy of the Cullen family. As Jimmy learned of his father's past, Lori snuck in to the Cullen family's meeting place and broke him out where the two of them escaped. Lori brought Jimmy to their mother's old chest and told them how the Cullen family killed his father. He was unable to bring himself to seek vengeance of Peach Cullen and left. While hitching a ride, Jimmy was picked up by Punisher. The Cullen family managed to locate Lori and capture her.

Punisher and Jimmy were ambushed by some members of the Cullen family and were able to temporarily get away from them. The rest of the Cullen family tracked Punisher and Jimmy to an abandoned truck stop where Punisher picked them off. Jimmy was able to confront Peach Cullen and Midge where he held them at gunpoint and coerced Peach into ending their war. Lori was unable to let them get away with what they done and killed Peach and Midge. After she had cried out that Jimmy killed them which was heard by Punisher, Jimmy fled into the night. After Punisher and Jimmy had gone their separate ways, the female half of the Cullen family arrived. The dying Peach Cullen told them that Lori was a true Cullen which led to Lori taking up the Cullen name and becoming the leader of the Cullen girls.

=== Unnamed criminal ===
Roderick Kingsley sold Hitman's gear to an unknown criminal. Hitman is seen working for the Hobgoblin (Kingsley's butler Claude) and participates in a battle against the Goblin King's Goblin Nation. After Hobgoblin is killed by Goblin King, Hitman defects to the Goblin Nation.

== Powers and abilities ==
Burt Kenyon was an extraordinary marksman with conventional military weapons and was a good hand-to-hand combatant.

Jimmy Pierce uses a variety of firearms and wears Kevlar body armor. He also has peak-level strength, speed and agility.

== In other media ==
- Hitman appears as a boss in The Punisher.
- Jim Pierce appears in the Iron Fist episode "Eight Diagram Dragon Palm", portrayed by Jay Hieron.
