= Punisher: In the Blood =

Limited edition comic book series

- Punisher: In the Blood #1 (2010); Cover art by Francesco Mattina

Publication information
- Publisher: Marvel Comics
- Schedule: Monthly
- Format: Limited series
- Genre: Superhero
- Publication date: 2010-2011
- No. of issues: 5
- Main character(s): Punisher; Henry Russo; Microchip; Stuart Clarke; Jigsaw

Creative team
- Written by: Rick Remender
- Artist(s): Francesco Mattina; Mick Bertiloronzi
- Penciller: Roland Boschi
- Colorist: Dan Brown

Collected editions
- Hardcover: ISBN 978-0-7851-5181-4
- Softcover: ISBN 0785151818

Punisher: In the Blood is a five-issue comic book limited series published by Marvel Comics. The Punisher faces the final battle against Jigsaw. The series was released in 2010 written by Rick Remender.

== Publication history ==
1. In The Blood Part One, January 2011
2. In The Blood Part Two, February 2011
3. In The Blood Part Three, March 2011
4. In The Blood Part Four, April 2011
5. In The Blood Part Five, May 2011

== Plot ==
Following the Dark Reign storyline, the Punisher started hunting the Hood. However, without results, so he went after Microchip to make him pay for murdering G.W. Bridge. Meanwhile, Microchip is knocked unconscious by Jigsaw. At their hideout, Henry Russo tells the Punisher how he hated his father because he constantly abused his mother and idolized the Punisher for being a thorn in Jigsaw's side. Henry suspects that his father may be alive and, despite the Punisher's protests, goes to visit his mother to make sure; however, when he arrives, his father, Jigsaw, confronts him and Stuart Clarke. Meanwhile, the Punisher heads to Microchip's lair, but instead of finding his old partner, he finds a mysterious woman in black leather with seemingly burnt skin who attacks him. In the story "Angel," she calls Frank in the story, and after she escapes, Frank suspects that he may know this woman.

Jigsaw and Stuart (now known as the Jigsaw brothers) tell Henry that Jigsaw is there to protect him from the Punisher, believing he is attempting to kill him. Jigsaw escorts his son, Henry, to his warehouse mansion. Stuart visits the warehouse mansion's captive Microchip. He explains that the Punisher killed his girlfriend and swears to make him accountable, but his revenge fails. Stuart walks away and tells him that the Punisher is coming. Meanwhile, the Punisher, determined to find Microchip, takes down multiple gangs to find his target and attacks Mirage and threatens him for everything he knows about where Microchip is, but the mysterious woman shoots Mirage. The Punisher believes that the mysterious woman is his wife, Maria.

Sometime later, the Punisher cannot get over the fact that Maria had been alive following her resurrection by the Hood and seemingly being burnt alive to torture him; the Punisher takes down more gangs seeking information about Jigsaw's whereabouts. Jigsaw and Stuart are planning to manipulate the Punisher. Later, The Punisher locates Jigsaw's hideout and kills Jigsaw's men, but the Punisher is confused when Henry confronts him, saying he knows the plans, and shocks the Punisher with a taser. Jigsaw is proud that his son Henry has subdued the Punisher.

Jigsaw shows his son Henry the monitor renderings where Punisher is held captive; Jigsaw allows him to kill Microchip by slashing his throat. Stuart inferred Jigsaw about his inheritance fund. Henry realizes his father is manipulating the Punisher and helps him escape. The Punisher confronts his wife, Maria, but is unwilling to kill her. Maria attempts to burn him with a flamethrower, but the Punisher receives a call from Henry revealing that Maria is a female assassin posing as Maria. The Punisher kills the imposter. Stuart catches Henry, who cuts his arms with razor blades, but Jigsaw stabs Stuart, who tells him he is wrong. Jigsaw promptly shoots Stuart and then attempts to kill his son.

Jigsaw attacks his son in pain until he stops upon seeing his young Henry. Jigsaw apologizes for what he did, but Henry kicks him away. With the warehouse on fire following the fight, Henry escapes to the roof, where the Punisher and Jigsaw meet him. The Punisher and Jigsaw begin a brutal hand-to-hand fight, during which Henry tells his father he wants a normal life. Jigsaw can render the Punisher unconscious, but the roof gives way. Henry reaches for his father and grabs his arm, trying to save him. Jigsaw releases Henry's arm before taking his own life. Henry almost falls, but the Punisher, who is now conscious, saves him. The Punisher forces Henry to leave and not search for his father. Weeks later, Henry and his mother are relaxing and beginning their new life free from Jigsaw.

== See also ==
- 2010 in comics
