= Rampage (Marvel Comics) =

Stuart Clarke
- Stuart Clarke. Art by Howard Chaykin.

Publication information
- Publisher: Marvel Comics
- First appearance: The Champions #5 (April 1976)
- Created by: Jenny Blake Isabella; Don Heck; John Tartag

In-story information
- Alter ego: Stuart Clarke
- Species: Human
- Team affiliations: Recession Raiders; Clarke Futuristics
- Supporting character of: Punisher
- Notable aliases: Rampage; Capitan Action Figure
- Abilities: No super powers as a human: Genius-level intelligence. Used to have a powered armor that granted him super-strength and durability.

Stuart Clarke is a fictional character appearing in American comic books published by Marvel Comics. The character is depicted as an ex-supervillain who first fought as Rampage against the short-lived Champions team. He is an ally of the Punisher, replacing Microchip.

Eric André portrays the character in the Marvel Cinematic Universe Disney+ series Ironheart (2025).

== Publication history ==
He first appeared in The Champions #5 (April 1976) and was created by Jenny Blake Isabella, Don Heck and John Tartag.

== Fictional character biography ==
Stuart Clarke was born in East Lansing, Michigan. He was working as an engineer at a company when he created an exo-skeleton suit. His company was bankrupted by recession, and he attempted a bank robbery but battled and was defeated by the Champions. After being injured in an explosion, Clarke is forced to use a wheelchair, and seeks revenge on the Champions soon after their disbanding. He manages to hypnotize Iceman and entrap him in one of the Rampage suits, forcing him to battle Angel and Spider-Man.

Clarke ends up homeless and his suits are stored away in a lab. Over the course of several weeks, Clarke unlocks the control protocols for the suits, allowing him to remotely control the suits and break them out of the lab. Clarke and his friends begin using the suits together and become known as the Recession Raiders. They soon get into a fight with Wonder Man and Beast. During the fight, Beast is hit with a brick chimney. Enraged, Wonder Man subdues the Raiders. Beast recovers after a short hospital stay.

Wonder Man's enemy Lotus springs Clarke from jail and participates in the creation of the armored team Armed Response. Alongside Splice and Armed Response, Rampage is sent to battle Wonder Man and the group Crazy-Eight. The eight, all personal friends of Wonder Man, manage to summon Wonder Man's help and the villains are defeated.

Rampage and his suit become the base for a private security force for Los Angeles. This group is called 'Armed Response' and are secretly corrupt. The Crazy-Eight deliver proof of this to the media, despite Armed Response's attempt to murder them. The force is shut down.

=== Punisher ===
Clarke is seen working with the Punisher during the Civil War, giving him the means to track down high-tech supervillains. Over the course of the series, Clarke forms a strong admiration for Frank Castle and his war on crime. When G. W. Bridge and Jigsaw both up the stakes in their separate attempts to track down Castle, Clarke is forced to go into hiding with Diamonelle, a woman who had been tending to Castle's wounds.

After Castle is apprehended by S.H.I.E.L.D., Clarke is willing to risk his own life for him. Before he can follow through, he is shot multiple times by Diamonelle, who is revealed to be a double agent, and in the process, also revealed to Clarke that Castle killed his girlfriend, Tati, in an earlier trip to Mexico.

Clarke survives the shooting and goes on to join Hood's crime syndicate. Reassuming the Rampage name, he swears revenge on the Punisher for killing Tati and swears to kill him. Clarke and the Punisher are attacked by Skrull forces, leaving Clarke scarred.

Rampage later rejoins Hood's gang and aids them in attacking Victor von Doom who had gone straight. After Doom is subdued, Rampage and Shockwave keep Doom held down while Wrecker opens his armor.

== Powers and abilities ==
Stuart Clarke is a genius with an advanced engineering degree.

=== Equipment ===
As Rampage, he possessed a power suit that gave him superhuman strength and durability.

== In other media ==
Stuart Clarke appears in Ironheart, portrayed by Eric André. This version is a member of a Chicago street crew led by the Hood who is later ousted and replaced by Riri Williams. Rampage is later killed by John King, leading Hood to fire his remaining gang members.
