= Lynn Michaels =

Comic book character mainly appearing in Marvel's Punisher

- Lynn Michaels on the cover of The Punisher War Journal #75 (February 1995); Art by Mark Texeira

Publication information
- Publisher: Marvel Comics
- First appearance: The Punisher War Zone #7 (Sept. 1992)
- Created by: Chuck Dixon; John Romita Jr.

In-story information
- Species: Human
- Place of origin: Earth
- Team affiliations: S.H.I.E.L.D. New York City Police Department
- Partnerships: Punisher
- Supporting character of: Punisher
- Notable aliases: Punisher; Diamonelle; Lady Punisher

Lynn Michaels is a fictional vigilante appearing in American comic books published by Marvel Comics. The character has been depicted as an ally of the antihero the Punisher.

== Publication history ==
She was created by Chuck Dixon and John Romita Jr., and first appeared in The Punisher War Zone #7 (Sept. 1992).

== Fictional character biography ==
She first appeared in The Punisher War Zone #7, as a police officer attempting to catch a serial rapist plaguing Central Park. Frank Castle / The Punisher is in the park as well, taking down targets of opportunity as he also hunts for the rapist. They both confront the criminal, but he escapes. Lynn and Frank team up to track him down, resulting in a series of confrontations with several international assassins. The rapist ultimately dies in a shootout that leaves Lynn wounded. While being treated, she plants a kiss on Frank. The fact that she worked with the Punisher becomes common knowledge among her colleagues on the force.

Later, Frank asks Lynn for help in tracking down an organization that is kidnapping people and stealing their blood so it can be illegally sold for medical purposes. Lynn kills the organization's leader, Mr. Sandeen, when he gets the drop on Frank, Ghost Rider and his ally Matt Murdock / Daredevil. Feeling that she had crossed the line again, she breaks down.

Everything changes for Lynn when she takes part in the arrest of a suspected thief, Clyde Allen Durkin, at his home. They discover evidence indicating that he has murdered several children, but due to warrant problems, the evidence is ruled inadmissible and Durkin gets jailed on only minor charges with no prison time. Disgusted, Lynn leaves the force.

The Punisher apparently kills himself with a bomb he had planted to take out a mobster's meeting. A government task force that targets vigilantes, called VIGIL, targets Payback, a new vigilante trying to fill the Punisher's shoes. He is Eddie Dyson, an ex-police officer who witnessed the murder of his family at the hands of mobsters. Lynn rescues Payback from VIGIL and takes up vigilantism herself.

=== Vigilante murders ===
Through a "gift" of cigarettes, Lynn causes Durkin to look out his cell window so she can kill him with a sniper rifle. Lynn and Eddie agree to a temporary partnership to take down VIGIL. As part of this agreement, they allow themselves to be arrested after they destroy a Mafia-run numbers racket. Blackwell, an abusive and corrupt member of VIGIL, beats Eddie and Lynn. The two manage to escape; in response, Blackwell murders a straight-arrow VIGIL officer named Jessup and frames the two vigilantes.

Eddie and Lynn travel to the town of Laastekist, where many factions, including the local Mafia, quickly become aware of their presence. Despite his injuries, Eddie assists Lynn in killing several soldiers from the Valducci crime family. However, gunmen from the Cullen family badly injure Lynn in an assassination attempt. Eddie gets her medical treatment and they escape the town.

After recovering from her wounds, Lynn breaks into VIGIL headquarters looking for Blackwell, seemingly unaware he was killed by the "dead" Frank Castle. She rescues the sheriff of Laastekist, Harry Bendix, unjustly imprisoned by VIGIL. Two sympathetic officers, Einhorn and Nails, allow them to escape.

=== Escaping the city ===
A former colleague identifies Lynn as the "Lady Punisher", responsible for the deaths of local drug dealers. Rosalie Carbone, the mobster who employed the dead men, sends an enforcer called "Mondo Pain" after Lynn and consequently, Bendix, who is injured in the fight. Lynn lures Pain away to protect him. She eventually finds what she believes to be the Punisher's personal diary, but becomes despondent upon realizing that he never mentions her once and burns it. She decides that Castle's life is not for her and persuades Eddie to give up vigilantism and start over with her. Lynn's father brings the two to a rural safehouse. A later sequence seems to indicate that the three of them are living peacefully, but it might have been Frank Castle's dream.

Lynn is later recruited by S.H.I.E.L.D., and poses as "Diamonelle" to infiltrate Jigsaw's gang. She shoots the Punisher's newest ally, Stuart Clarke, for being a cop killer. After Jigsaw is arrested, Lynn allows him to be murdered before being taken into custody.

== Abilities and training ==
Lynn is a trained law-enforcement officer which includes proficiency at unarmed and armed combat with various firearms. Like the Punisher, she is not averse to using guns in her war against crime. She wears a Punisher-inspired Kevlar costume.
