= The Punisher (1990 computer game) =

- Cover art for the DOS version
- Developers: Paragon Software (DOS); The Edge (Amiga, Atari ST)
- Publishers: MicroProse (DOS); The Edge (Amiga, Atari ST)
- Platforms: Amiga; Atari ST; DOS
- Release: DOS: NA: 1990; Amiga: UK: 1990; Atari ST: UK: 1990
- Genres: Action; Racing (DOS)
- Mode: Single-player

The Punisher is a 1990 video game developed by Paragon Software and released by MicroProse, which stars the Marvel Comics antihero, the Punisher. An unrelated game for Amiga and Atari ST was released by The Edge also in 1990.

In the same year, there was also a third unrelated The Punisher game for NES, released by LJN.

== Gameplay ==
The DOS version features three different modes of gameplay: driving the Punisher's "Battle Van", walking through NYC's streets and select buildings, and scuba diving.

The player takes the role of the Punisher and will try to take revenge upon the organised crime, who has killed Punisher's family. The equipment consists of a knife, several semi-automatic guns, grenades, the Battle Van, and a scuba gear.

== Reception ==
In the issue number 77 of Computer Gaming World (December 1990), Charles Ardai stated that the DOS version of The Punisher "is wish-fulfillment of the highest order, a Death Wish revenge fantasy mixed with an honest cry from the gut for justice [...]. For real New Yorkers dealing with an all-too-real" crime waves, and predicted strong sales in urban areas. He gave the game a qualified recommendation, however, because of flaws including graphics of inconsistent quality, poor controls, bugs, and ineffective, manual-based copy protection.

In the issue number 148 of the same magazine, Punisher as in the Paragon Software developed version is mentioned as the fifteenth most memorable hero of all time.

In October 1991, The Punisher was indexed by the Federal Department for Media Harmful to Young Persons of Germany in a list for games deemed to be a bad influence for younger gamers.

== See also ==
- List of video games based on Marvel Comics
