= Cosmic Ghost Rider =

Superhero created by Marvel Comics

- Cosmic Ghost Rider as depicted in Cosmic Ghost Rider #1 (September 2018). Art by Mike Deodato Jr.

Publication information
- Publisher: Marvel Comics
- First appearance: Thanos (vol. 2) #13 (January 2018)
- Created by: Donny Cates; Geoff Shaw (based on the character created by Gerry Conway, John Romita Sr. and Ross Andru)

In-story information
- Alter ego: Francis David "Frank" Castle
- Team affiliations: Heralds of Galactus; Guardians of the Galaxy; Dark Guardians
- Partnerships: Galactus (master); King Thanos (master); Punisher Thanos (son)
- Notable aliases: The Rider; The Punisher; Cosmic Ghost Phoenix Rider
- Abilities: Endowed with the Spirit of Vengeance/Hellfire manipulation and Power Cosmic; Utilizes chains made from Cyttorak's bones

Cosmic Ghost Rider (Francis David "Frank" Castle) is a fictional superhero appearing in American comic books published by Marvel Comics. His physical appearance and origin are an amalgam of Punisher, Ghost Rider, and Silver Surfer, with his personality inspired by Deadpool.

== Publication history ==
Cosmic Ghost Rider was created by Donny Cates and Geoff Shaw, and first appeared in Thanos #13 (January 2018). His backstory was revealed in Thanos #16.

In 2019, Cosmic Ghost Rider starred in the miniseries Cosmic Ghost Rider Destroys Marvel History, written by Paul Scheer.

== Fictional character biography ==
=== Origin ===
In the alternate reality where Thanos conquered the universe, Frank Castle's early life was seemingly similar to that of the Frank Castle of the Earth-616 universe. When Thanos came to Earth, the Punisher was one of the last casualties during the last stand of the heroes, and his soul was subsequently sent to Hell. Willing to give anything in order to punish Thanos for slaughtering his planet, the Punisher signed a demonic deal with Mephisto and became the Ghost Rider. When he returned to Earth, however, Thanos was already gone, and everything on Earth was dead. The Punisher roams Earth for years until a badly injured Galactus arrives and makes him his herald to help battle Thanos.

Several centuries later, Cosmic Ghost Rider and Galactus confront Thanos, who beheads Galactus in battle. Thanos gives Cosmic Ghost Rider a shard of the Time Gem so that he can travel to the past, recruit a young version of Thanos, and assist in the killing of the Fallen One. Cosmic Ghost Rider battles the Fallen One, who manages to kill him.

=== Arrival on Earth-616 ===
Odin from the main reality retrieves Cosmic Ghost Rider's soul and takes him to Valhalla, though Cosmic Ghost Rider is unsatisfied. Odin returns his powers and offers to revive him in any time period of his choosing. Cosmic Ghost Rider chooses the day Thanos was born, which allows him to take Thanos into his care and prevent him from becoming a villain. However, this creates a new timeline where Thanos becomes a dictator. After learning this, Cosmic Ghost Rider returns the young Thanos to his own time to restore the timeline.

In the aftermath of the "Infinity Wars" storyline, Cosmic Ghost Rider is revealed to have been stranded on Earth-616 and attends Thanos' funeral. The funeral is attacked by the Black Order, who steals Thanos's body and rips open a hole in space, sending everyone into the rip. Everyone is saved by the arrival of Gladiator and the Shi'ar. Starfox begins to recruit warriors to find Gamora, the most likely candidate to be Thanos's new body, as they form the Dark Guardians, which causes Cosmic Ghost Rider to side with them. Wraith brings up the issue of the Black Order, but Starfox assures they are searching for them and Nebula states that the team should track down Nova to find Gamora's location. Cosmic Ghost Rider and the Dark Guardians track down Nova and clash with the Guardians of the Galaxy to take Gamora. Hela and the Black Order crash the battle, with Hela taking control of Cosmic Ghost Rider and having Thanos' consciousness possess Starfox. Cosmic Ghost Rider's body later falls apart, with his spirit arriving in Hell and encountering Johnny Blaze.

Cosmic Ghost Rider later leaves Earth and begins a campaign in the cosmos punishing villains for their sins. This attracts the Shi'ar, who have the Imperial Guard capture him. While in prison, Cosmic Ghost Rider is attacked by a mysterious creature who drains his energy, destroying all of his body except for his skull. One of the prison officers initiates the prison's self-destruct sequence, destroying the prison. Months later, Cosmic Ghost Rider's skull is recovered by a group of pirates, who he kills before rebuilding his body. Cosmic Ghost Rider spares Cammi, whose he declares to be innocent. Cammi goes on to become Cosmic Ghost Rider's companion, with the two battling the Cosmic King and various other villains.

== Powers and abilities ==
Cosmic Ghost Rider has the same abilities as the Ghost Rider as well as Hellfire manipulation and wielding the Power Cosmic.

=== Equipment ===
Cosmic Ghost Rider wields chains made from the bones of Cyttorak. He also rides around on a Hell Cycle.

== In other media ==
- Cosmic Ghost Rider appears as a playable character in Marvel Contest of Champions.
- Cosmic Ghost Rider appears as an alternate costume for Punisher in Marvel Future Fight.
- Cosmic Ghost Rider appears as a playable character in Marvel Cosmic Invasion, voiced by Brian Bloom.

== Collected editions ==
Title	Material collected	Published date	ISBN
Cosmic Ghost Rider: Baby Thanos Must Die	Cosmic Ghost Rider (2018–2019) #1–5, material from Thanos Legacy #1	February 2019	978-1302913533
Cosmic Ghost Rider Destroys Marvel History	Cosmic Ghost Rider Destroys Marvel History #1–6	October 2019	978-1302917456
Revenge of the Cosmic Ghost Rider	Revenge of the Cosmic Ghost Rider #1–5	September 2020	978-1302921705
Cosmic Ghost Rider Omnibus	Thanos (vol. 2) #13–18, Thanos Annual #1, Cosmic Ghost Rider #1–5, Cosmic Ghost Rider Destroys Marvel History #1–6, Guardians of the Galaxy (vol. 5) #1–6, Avengers (vol. 8) #22–25, Revenge of the Cosmic Ghost Rider #1–5, material from Thanos Legacy #1, Wolverine: Black, White & Blood #3	October 2021	978-1302929633
Cosmic Ghost Rider: Duel Identity	Cosmic Ghost Rider (2023) #1–5	October 2023	978-1302948122
