= The Punisher (1991 NES video game) =

- Developer: Beam Software
- Publisher: LJN
- Directors: Chuck Dixon; John Romita Sr.
- Designers: Gregg Barnett; Paul Kidd
- Programmer: Jamie Rivett
- Artist: Tony G. Pentland
- Composers: Gavan Anderson; Tania Smith
- Series: The Punisher
- Platform: Nintendo Entertainment System
- Release: NA: January 1991
- Genre: Rail shooter
- Mode: Single-player

The Punisher is a 1991 video game developed by Beam Software and released by LJN, which stars the Marvel Comics anti-hero, the Punisher. It is one of the few NES rail shooters.

== Premise ==
The Punisher's origin has been slightly altered to a former detective, from the original comic books as a US Marine who served in the Vietnam War.

== Gameplay ==
The player controls the Punisher from an over-the-shoulder third-person perspective through various New York City locations, shooting thugs and battling supervillains Hitman, Jigsaw, Colonel Kliegg, Sijo Kanaka, and Assassin as bosses. The final boss is the Kingpin. Power-ups can be obtained by shooting them and include extra ammunition, a med kit, Kevlar, a bazooka, a machine gun, and grenades.

== Reception ==
In 2013, Fred Rojas of Gaminghistory101 said he was quite impressed with the graphical prowess and praised the interesting addition to the traditional light gun format and the brawler element, which is key to completing two of the boss battles, that requires the player to have more than crack shot skills. Conversely he criticized the lack of music: "All of the levels seem eerily quiet and the saxophone player that shows up in the most odd of times and location provides the only break from the action, but his song is neither interesting enough nor is there any incentive to keep him alive." He criticized the boss battle with the Kingpin for being frustratingly difficult but still considered the game to be as it was when it first came out and that it is a gem among Nintendo's initial console.

Videogamechoochoo.com's reviewer Ryan expressed disappointment at the developers' decision to lock the Punisher into the bottom of the screen and let the player slide him around, ending up as "one of the few" rail shooters for NES. He said, "It's easy to see why- attempting to both dodge bullets and position the crosshairs with just the D-pad is an obtuse, miserable experience." He criticized the lack of soundtrack: "There's a title theme, and a menu theme that gets re-used for boss fights, and that's about it. The only sounds that accompany you through the levels are those of gunfire and explosions. Occasionally a bluesy jazz man will spawn and play you a morose 8-bit saxophone tune, but like everything else in the game, you can just blow him to shreds, silencing him for good." He praised the accurate portrayal of the Punisher, the violence he commits, his antagonists, and the graphics. He was surprised at how much simultaneous action was onscreen.

Blair Farrell of Comic Gamers Assemble stated that the game would have benefited from the NES Zapper but that the game's design added depth to the simple shooting mechanics.

Controls are easy enough in The Punisher: Move the d-pad around the screen until it lines up with a target, press "A" to shoot and "B" to lob grenades and other explosives. When not holding down the shoot button, the Punisher character will move left and right across the screen, allowing the player to dodge some incoming enemy fire and projectiles, thus increasing your overall chance of survival. Had Beam just made this a simple light gun game, this mechanic would either be nonexistent, or awkwardly controlled with both the gun AND a controller. By adding in simple movement, it adds depth to what could have been a pretty shallow experience.

== Game Boy version ==
Also in 1991 the game was converted to the Game Boy, titled The Punisher: The Ultimate Payback, with several differences, including an appearance from Spider-Man.

== See also ==
- Marvel Games
