= Jigsaw (Marvel Comics) =

Marvel Comics fictional character

- Textless cover of The Punisher War Journal #18 (June 2008) by Ariel Olivetti

Publication information
- Publisher: Marvel Comics
- First appearance: Cameo appearance: The Amazing Spider-Man #161 (October 1976); Full appearance: The Amazing Spider-Man #162 (November 1976)
- Created by: Len Wein; Ross Andru

In-story information
- Full name: William "Billy" Russo
- Species: Human
- Place of origin: Earth-616
- Team affiliations: Maggia; Hood's Crime Syndicate
- Partnerships: Rev; Stuart Clarke
- Notable aliases: The Beaut, The Heavy
- Abilities: Criminal mastermind; Highly skilled street fighter and hand-to-hand combatant; Expert strategist, tactician, and organizer; Wears a special exoskeleton

Jigsaw (William "Billy" Russo, also known as "The Beaut" before his disfigurement) is a supervillain appearing in American comic books published by Marvel Comics. Created by writer Len Wein and artist Ross Andru, the character made his first full appearance in The Amazing Spider-Man #162 (November 1976). He is depicted as an enemy of the Punisher and Spider-Man as well as a recurring foe of Daredevil.

The character was portrayed by Dominic West in the film Punisher: War Zone, and Ben Barnes in the Marvel Cinematic Universe (MCU) Netflix series The Punisher.

== Publication history ==
Jigsaw was created by writer Len Wein and artist Ross Andru. He first appeared in The Amazing Spider-Man #162 (November 1976). He returned in The Amazing Spider-Man #188, and The Punisher #1 and #4–5. Jigsaw then allied with the Rev in The Punisher Vol. 2, #35–40, and Gregario in #55–56. Following a cameo appearance in The Punisher War Journal #61, Jigsaw's origin was detailed in Issues #3–4 of the prequel limited series The Punisher: Year One, and he further bedeviled the Punisher in Punisher Vol. 3, #2–4 and #9–10.

Preceding an encounter with the eponymous character in Daredevil Vol. 2, #61–64, Jigsaw appeared in New Avengers #1–3, #35, #46, #50, #57, and The New Avengers Annual #2; concurrent to his appearances in that title, Jigsaw also starred in Punisher War Journal Vol. 2, #11, #18–20, and #22–23. He was then featured in the five-issue miniseries Punisher: In the Blood, and made a subsequent cameo in the Thunderbolts Vol. 2 Annual.

Jigsaw received profiles in The Official Handbook of the Marvel Universe #6, The Official Handbook of the Marvel Universe Master Edition #10, Marvel Encyclopedia #4 and #5, New Avengers Most Wanted Files #1, and Official Handbook of the Marvel Universe A–Z #6.

== Fictional character biography ==
Billy Russo was born to a poor Italian-American family, kicked out and abandoned as an orphan by his abusive father at the age of ten, and went on to become a hitman for New York's Italian criminal underworld, where his good looks garnered him the nickname "Billy the Beaut". He married a woman named Susan, and would beat both her and their son, Henry, once forcing Henry to drown his pet cat's kittens by threatening to shoot Susan. After the botched gangland execution that inadvertently led to the Castle family being massacred, Russo is hired by Frank Costa to cover up their deaths by killing all of their friends and loved ones. Russo kills all of his targets except for Frank Castle, who survives a bomb planted by Russo. Hours later, Frank, now the vigilante Punisher, tracks Russo down to a Maggia nightclub. He guns down all of Russo's men, but leaves him alive to send a message to organized crime after knocking him through a glass window pane, an act that reduces Russo's face to a jigsaw puzzle-like mess of scars.

Taking advantage of his hideous visage, Russo adopts the identity of "Jigsaw", and attempts to frame the Punisher for murder. The plan fails due to the intervention of Spider-Man and Nightcrawler; Spider-Man witnesses one of Jigsaw's murders, and one of his victims is an old friend of Nightcrawler's. Jigsaw later battled Spider-Man again.

It is revealed in the first Punisher miniseries that Jigsaw was behind a plan to drug the Punisher, causing his enemy to behave erratically and attack anyone he perceived as a criminal, even for something as minor as littering. Jigsaw also attempts to kill the Punisher while he is incarcerated. The Punisher confronts and defeats him, and later stops Jigsaw from escaping under cover of a prison riot. Later in the series, Jigsaw is brainwashed by the Trust into serving as a member of a Punisher-style assassination squad. He manages to remember whom he is after encountering Castle once again, and attacks the Punisher, only to be defeated once more.

Jigsaw is broken out of Ryker's Island by the Rev, who has him supervise the importation of a sterility-inducing Venezuelan drug intended for testing on the people of New York City. When the drug shipment is destroyed by the Punisher, Jigsaw sics a street gang on him, and flees to Venezuela with the Rev. After Jigsaw's face is healed by the Rev's powers, he is shot by the Punisher, but resurrected by the Rev, with the assistance of Belasco. Jigsaw's restored face is destroyed, and he is left for dead in the jungle in a later battle with the Punisher. Jigsaw recovers, and subsequently attempts to illegally reenter the United States, but is arrested and returned to Ryker's Island. When the Punisher is captured by the authorities and sent to same prison, Jigsaw tries to kill him, but the Punisher survives and escapes from Ryker's.

After the Punisher is arrested and sentenced to death for countless murders, Jigsaw dons a stylized copy of his costume and embarks on a homicidal rampage, targeting all those connected to the execution. When the Punisher is revealed to still be alive, an overjoyed Jigsaw attempts to kill him, but the Punisher overpowers him with the assistance of Daredevil. Jigsaw later partners with various syndicates to lay siege to the estate of the Geraci crime family after learning that Punisher has been forced to become their new underboss. Jigsaw and his allies abduct the Geracis, but they are saved by the Punisher, who shoots Jigsaw in the head.

Jigsaw next establishes a gunrunning operation, which is broken up by Daredevil and Black Widow. When his attempt at negotiating with Daredevil (who had declared himself the new Kingpin) fails, Jigsaw seeks revenge by breaking into Daredevil's home, where he is subdued by Black Widow. Jigsaw is remanded to the Raft, an island supervillain prison, which he escapes from (breaking Spider-Man's arm in the process) when the facility is attacked by Electro. Once free, Jigsaw tries to rob a bank, but is beaten by Tigra. This humiliation leads to his forming an alliance with the self-proclaimed "super-villain Kingpin" the Hood; together, Jigsaw and the Hood film themselves threatening and torturing Tigra. Later, Jigsaw takes part in the Hood's attack on the Sanctum Sanctorum, where he attempts to snipe Jessica Jones and Danielle Cage, only to be foiled by Spider-Man.

Jigsaw has resumed his vendetta against the Punisher, in the pages of Punisher: War Journal. Now wearing a color-inverted mockup of the Punisher costume, Jigsaw arranges for the brainwashing of a young auxiliary police officer in the NYPD. Exploiting the naive cop's pathological "hero-worship" complex, Jigsaw and his new psychiatrist girlfriend turn the young man into a new version of the Punisher.

After a battle on the Brooklyn Bridge where the Punisher once again spares Jigsaw's life, Jigsaw is taken into S.H.I.E.L.D. custody. While imprisoned, he is seemingly shot dead by the man that he and his girlfriend (who was actually undercover S.H.I.E.L.D. agent Lynn Michaels) had brainwashed. Jigsaw survived the attempt on his life, and was transferred to a "reprogramming asylum" by H.A.M.M.E.R. He returns to the Hood's gang in Secret Invasion to assist in fending off the invading Skrulls, and rejoins again in Dark Reign to help attack the New Avengers.

=== Punisher Vol. 12 ===
In the fallout from the "Secret Empire" event, Punisher is captured by Nick Fury and handed over to Baron Zemo, who's eager to exact punishment on the vigilante for targeting Hydra. Jigsaw accompanies Zemo in Bagalia, acting as one of the Baron's operatives. Zemo's plans to publicly execute Frank Castle in Bagalia go wrong and Jigsaw is dispatched to re-capture Castle. Commanding Zemo's Hydra agents, Jigsaw ultimately kills Sister Mercy, a nun Frank befriended in Bagalia's prison.

Both Zemo and Castle ultimately escape Bagalia and Jigsaw then appears in NYC, where he is presented as a disguised member of Zemo's Thunderbolts. Jigsaw clashes with Thunderbolts veteran Moonstone while holed up with the rest of the team, but when the Thunderbolts do battle with Punisher's squad of allied heroes, Jigsaw intervenes to save Zemo, allowing the Thunderbolts to escape with a hostage.

=== Death ===
Sometime after the Punisher becomes leader of the Hand, Jigsaw and other criminals group together to kill him. During an explosion, Jigsaw attacks the Punisher to finally kill him once and for all. However, the Punisher gains the upper hand and stabs Jigsaw in the throat with a sword, killing him instead.

== Powers and abilities ==
Jigsaw is an athletic man with no superhuman powers. During his time in prison, he was able to hone his physical strength to a level comparable to the Punisher. He has extensive experience with street-fighting techniques, and familiarity with a variety of weapons and criminal techniques. He carries various handguns as needed. He has been known to wear a special exo-skeleton in his outfits. Before Jigsaw was disfigured, he was a highly charismatic leader and criminal organizer, but after the accident, only the latter trait remained.

== Other versions ==
=== 2099 ===
Jigsaw 2099, on the cover of The Punisher 2099 #10 (November 1993). Art by Tom Morgan.

Jigsaw 2099, a character based on Jigsaw, appears in the series Punisher 2099. He initially appears as Multi-Fractor, a cyborg and leading member of a crime syndicate called Cyber-Nostra. After Multi-Fractor is killed by the Punisher, he is resurrected as Jigsaw 2099, a Frankenstein's monster-like being made of machinery and body parts taken from animals.

=== Crossovers ===
Jigsaw appears in both Batman/Punisher intercompany crossover books. In the first crossover, Jigsaw allies with the Joker and they both fight the Punisher and Batman (Jean-Paul Valley). In the sequel, Jigsaw's face is repaired by a plastic surgeon, only to be destroyed again by one of the Punisher's grenades.

In the Amalgam Universe, Jigsaw is merged with DC Comics character Cheetah to form "Pelt-Man"; cursed by an ancient ritual to resemble a big cat, Billy Minerva takes his anger over his condition out on beautiful people, mutilating their faces.

=== Earth X ===
An alternate universe version of Jigsaw appears in Earth X. At some point, Jigsaw died and was sent to the Realm of the Dead. When Captain Marvel and Thanos destroy Death and create Paradise, Jigsaw realizes that he is dead, but refuses to go to Paradise. Remaining in the Realm of the Dead, Jigsaw and Jackal begin tormenting the Punisher until Captain America banishes them to a desolate region of the Realm of the Dead.

=== Marvel MAX ===
Jigsaw, operating under the alias The Heavy, appears in the "Girls in White Dresses" storyline of The Punisher MAX. This version is a drug lord with operations in Mexico who kidnaps women from border towns for use as disposable slave labor in meth labs. The Punisher proceeds to destroy Jigsaw's Mexican operation and free his captives, and during a subsequent fight between the two archenemies the Punisher knocks Jigsaw out a window and onto the boxcar of a passing train, leaving his fate ambiguous.

Jigsaw's role in "Girls in White Dresses" was regarded as generic and anticlimactic, and his inclusion in the MAX imprint criticized as obtrusive and gratuitous, by Jesse Schedeen of IGN, who felt that the character was "planted in this story mainly to appeal to fans of the recent movie".

=== Marvel Noir ===
Jigsaw is Al Capone's top assassin in Punisher Noir. He, Barracuda, and Russian are hired to kill Frank Castelione, a grocer who had defied mob boss Dutch Schultz. Years later, Frank's son, the Punisher, tries to ambush Jigsaw, but is shot unconscious, and has his skull-face mask removed. Jigsaw takes the Punisher to his lair, and tortures him by carving a skull into the Punisher's chest. After Jigsaw mentions who helped him and Barracuda murder Frank, the Punisher escapes his bonds, and kills Jigsaw by garroting.

== In other media ==
=== Television ===
Ben Barnes as Jigsaw in The Punisher

Billy Russo / Jigsaw appears in The Punisher (2017), portrayed by Ben Barnes. This version is Frank Castle's former best friend who served alongside him in the Marine Corps Force Reconnaissance as a Scout Sniper. After leaving the Marines, Russo founded a private military company called Anvil. Throughout the first season, Russo works with his former commanding officer William Rawlins to eliminate Castle and anyone who could link them to their illegal affairs in Kandahar while pursuing a relationship with DHS agent Dinah Madani. However, Madani deduces Russo's criminal activities while Castle kills Rawlins and disfigures Russo's face before the latter is hospitalized. In the second season, Russo begins wearing a mask with a shattered visage and receives psychiatric help from Dr. Krista Dumont to address his scars and memory loss. After re-encountering Castle and following a failed bank robbery, Russo attempts to flee with Dumont, only for Madani to find them and get Dumont to safety. Russo takes refuge in Curtis Hoyle's workplace basement, but Curtis alerts Castle, who finds and kills Russo.

=== Film ===
Dominic West as Jigsaw in Punisher: War Zone

- Jigsaw was included in one of Michael France's early drafts of The Punisher (2004). Punisher actor Thomas Jane later revealed that Jigsaw was going to be the main antagonist in the sequel, which was ultimately never produced.
- Jigsaw appears in Punisher: War Zone, portrayed by Dominic West. This version is a young crime boss named Billy "The Beaut" Russoti. While attending a mob dinner, the Punisher attacks the attending criminals. Russoti escapes to his recycling plant, but is pursued by the Punisher and falls into a glass crusher. Russoti receives help from a plastic surgeon, but the latter is unable to restore his mutilated visage due to his facial muscles, tendons, skin, and bone structure being damaged beyond repair. Rechristening himself "Jigsaw", Russoti breaks his brother James Russoti out of an asylum to assist him in getting revenge on the Punisher. They kidnap the Punisher's allies and unite several New York criminal gangs under them to lure him into a trap, but the Punisher kills them all, the final battle culminating in Punisher throwing Russoti into a fire, where he burns to death.

=== Video games ===
- Jigsaw appears as a boss in The Punisher (1990) NES game.
- Jigsaw appears as the final boss of The Punisher: The Ultimate Payback!.
- Jigsaw appears in The Punisher (1990) PC game.
- Jigsaw appears as a sub-boss in The Punisher (1993).
- An original incarnation of Jigsaw appears in The Punisher 2004 film tie-in game, voiced by Darryl Kurylo. This version is John Saint, the son of crime lord Howard Saint, who was left facially disfigured after being attacked and left for dead by the Punisher. Taking the name "Jigsaw", John takes over his deceased father's business and vows revenge on the Punisher.
- Jigsaw appears as a playable character in The Punisher: No Mercy.

=== Merchandise ===
- In 2006, a figure of Jigsaw was released as part of a two-pack in the second wave of the Marvel Legends "Face-Off" series. He was paired with the Punisher and came in two versions, one with a business suit and one with a Punisher costume. The two-pack was released in December 2006.
- In 2008, a figure of Jigsaw based on his appearance in Punisher: War Zone was released in a Minimates box set alongside the Punisher and Loony Bin Jim.
- In 2009, Hasbro released a Jigsaw figure in their Mighty Muggs toy line.
- In 2022, Hasbro released a Walgreens exclusive Jigsaw figure in their Marvel Legends line.
