= Punisher: War Zone =

2008 film directed by Lexi Alexander

- Theatrical release poster
- Directed by: Lexi Alexander
- Written by: Nick Santora; Art Marcum Matt Holloway
- Based on: Punisher by Marvel Comics
- Produced by: Gale Anne Hurd
- Starring: Ray Stevenson; Dominic West; Julie Benz; Colin Salmon; Doug Hutchison; Dash Mihok; Wayne Knight
- Cinematography: Steve Gainer
- Edited by: William Yeh
- Music by: Michael Wandmacher
- Production companies: Lionsgate Films; Marvel Studios (Note: The company is credited as Marvel Studios, but uses the Marvel Knights banner.); Valhalla Motion Pictures; MHF Zweite Academy Film; SGF Entertainment Inc.
- Distributed by: Lionsgate Films (North America); Sony Pictures Releasing International (International)
- Release date: December 5, 2008
- Running time: 103 minutes
- Countries: United States; Canada; Germany
- Language: English
- Budget: $35 million
- Box office: $10.2 million

Punisher: War Zone (stylized as War Zone: Punisher) is a 2008 vigilante action film based on the Marvel Comics character the Punisher. Rather than a sequel to 2004's The Punisher, the film is a reboot that follows the war waged by vigilante Frank Castle / Punisher (played by Ray Stevenson) on crime and corruption, in particular on the disfigured mob boss known as Billy "Jigsaw" Russoti (Dominic West). The film is directed by Lexi Alexander, from a screenplay written by Nick Santora and Art Marcum & Matt Holloway. It is the third feature film adaptation of the Punisher, the second reboot thereof and the first of two films to be produced under the Marvel Knights production banner, which focuses on films for mature audiences.

Development of a follow-up to The Punisher began two months before its release. The film was initially developed as a sequel, with Thomas Jane reprising the title role. Jane departed the project in 2006, and Ray Stevenson was announced as his replacement in July 2007. Filming began in October 2007 in Montreal, Canada.

Punisher: War Zone was released in North America by Lionsgate Films on December 5, 2008, and it was released in the United Kingdom by Sony Pictures Releasing on February 6, 2009 to negative reviews and grossed $10.2 million worldwide on a budget of $35 million, making it a box-office bomb. Its related soundtrack hit the #23 slot on Billboard's Top Independent Albums chart. In the years since its release, the film has developed a cult following.

This was the final Punisher film to be produced by an outside studio before the rights reverted to Marvel Studios. The Punisher franchise was rebooted in the Marvel Cinematic Universe, with Jon Bernthal portraying the character in the second season of Daredevil (2016), a Punisher spin-off series (2017–2019), the first season of Daredevil: Born Again (2025), the television special The Punisher: One Last Kill, and the film Spider-Man: Brand New Day (both 2026), the latter of which marks the first feature film appearance of the Punisher since War Zone. Stevenson reprised his role as Castle in The Super Hero Squad Show.

== Plot ==
Having lost his family to mob violence, former Force Recon Marine Frank Castle has spent the last five years as a vigilante known as the Punisher. Castle assaults a party for local Don Gaitano Cesare and kills him and the guests. Cesare's caporegime Billy "The Beaut" Russoti and his entourage, Nicky Donatelli, escape to his recycling plant hideout, and Detectives Martin Soap and Saffiotti, who were staking out the party, inform Castle. Castle infiltrates Russoti's hideout and, after a brief firefight, Russoti is thrown into a glass-crushing machine that leaves him hideously disfigured. After a facial surgery that failed to restore his good looks, Russoti later referred to himself as "Jigsaw" because the stitches in his face resemble puzzle pieces. Castle kills Nicky, but he discovers that Donatelli was actually an undercover FBI agent.

Agent Paul Budiansky, the deceased agent's partner, joins the NYPD's "Punisher Task Force", partnering with Soap to help bring Castle to justice. Meanwhile, Jigsaw frees his deranged and cannibalistic brother, "Loony Bin Jim".

Distraught over killing the agent, Castle unsuccessfully attempts to make reparations to Donatelli's widow, Angela, and daughter, Grace. He considers retiring, but his armorer Micro makes him reconsider after telling him that Jigsaw will go after Donatelli's family for revenge.

Jigsaw, Loony Bin Jim, and their two henchmen, Ink and Pittsy, break into Donatelli's house and hold the family hostage. Castle tracks down Maginty, a known associate of Jigsaw, and executes him after extracting the information, before Budiansky and Soap apprehend him. Castle tells him that Jigsaw went after Donatelli's family, and Budiansky sends a police car to check on the Donatelli residence, intending to turn Castle in. When the patrol car fails to respond, Budiansky checks on the house, where Ink and Pittsy capture him. Soap frees Castle, who kills both Ink and Pittsy before leading Angela and Grace away. Budiansky then arrests Jigsaw and Loony Bin Jim after a short gunfight.

Jigsaw and his brother bargain with the FBI for their release by giving up Cristu Bulat, who was smuggling in a biological weapon destined for Arab terrorists in Queens, New York. The brothers are granted immunity, plus the US$12 million Bulat was paying to use Jigsaw's port, and a file on Micro. They take Micro hostage, killing his mother in the process. They once again take the Donatellis hostage, after Jim critically injures Micro's associate, Carlos, whom Castle had left to protect them. Castle later arrives at the hideout and kills Carlos in an act of mercy after Carlos asks him to not let him "die like this". Jigsaw sets himself up in the abandoned Bradstreet Hotel, putting together a small army of gangsters desiring vengeance against the Punisher. Castle enlists the help of Budiansky, who informs Cristu's father, Tiberiu Bulat, about Jigsaw's location. Tiberiu's enforcers start a shootout in the hotel lobby, affording Castle a distraction.

Castle enters through a second-floor window, leading to a firefight with Jigsaw's hired guns. Afterward, Castle engages Loony Bin Jim in solo combat; realizing that he will probably not survive the brawl, Jim flees. Castle chases and confronts both him and Jigsaw, who are holding Micro and Grace at gunpoint in the spa room. Jigsaw gives Castle a choice: If Castle shoots Micro or Grace, Jigsaw will let the other one go free. Micro bravely offers his life to save the girl, but Castle chooses to shoot Loony Bin Jim instead. As a result, Jigsaw kills Micro. Enraged, Castle attacks Jigsaw, engaging him in hand to hand combat, before impaling him with a metal rod and killing him by throwing him onto a fire-lit brazier.

Outside, Angela forgives Castle, while pointing out that her husband once vouched for him. Castle bids farewell to Budiansky and the Donatelli family. As Castle and Soap leave together, Soap tries to convince Castle to give up his vigilante status after having "killed every criminal in town." Soap changes his mind when he is held up by a murderous mugger, who is shot by Castle.

== Cast ==
- Ray Stevenson as Frank Castle / The Punisher: Prior to filming, Stevenson read every possible issue of the Punisher MAX series, underwent endurance, martial arts, and weapons training with former Force Recon Marines and the film's fight choreographer Pat E. Johnson.
- Dominic West as Billy "The Beaut" Russoti / Jigsaw: A vain and image-obsessed Mafia killer. By killing off the established gangsters, Punisher creates the opportunity for Jigsaw to become a boss. The character's given name is changed from the comics, where he is called "Billy Russo." Paddy Considine was considered for the role of Jigsaw in the film, but the offer was retracted and given to West who had previously turned it down.
- Doug Hutchison as James Russoti / "Loony Bin Jim" / "LBJ": Jigsaw's chemically imbalanced, cannibalistic, psychopathic brother whose veins practically flow with adrenaline and testosterone, leaving him in a constant state of homicidal mania that he alleviates by going on periodical killing sprees. He is an original character created for the film.
- Colin Salmon as FBI Agent Paul Budiansky: Former partner of Nicky Donatelli. Based on an NYPD officer of the same name in the Punisher story arc "Widowmaker".
- Wayne Knight as Linus Lieberman / Microchip: Armorer to the Punisher. The character makes his live-action film debut, after being written out of the 2004 film due to director Jonathan Hensleigh's dislike of him.
- Dash Mihok as Detective Martin Soap: Head detective of the NYPD's "Punisher Task Force".
- Julie Benz as Angela Donatelli: the widow of FBI agent Nicky Donatelli.
- Stephanie Janusauskas as Grace Donatelli: Angela and Nicky's daughter.
- Mark Camacho as Carmine "Pittsy" Gazzera: One of Jigsaw's henchmen, and Ink's father. One of two henchmen originating from the Punisher story arc "In the Beginning".
- Romano Orzari as FBI Agent Nicky Donatelli: An undercover FBI agent attached to Russoti, whose accidental death is the catalyst for the events in the story.
- Keram Malicki-Sánchez as "Ink" Gazzera: One of Jigsaw's henchmen, and Pittsy's cocaine-addicted son. One of two henchmen originating from the Punisher story arc "In the Beginning".
- T.J. Storm as Maginty: A member of the Westies and leader of an "urban freeflow" gang. He originates from the Punisher story arc "Kitchen Irish."
- Carlos Gonzalez-Vio as Carlos: Former Latin Kings gangbanger who allied with Micro and effectively Punisher.
- David Vadim as Cristu Bulat: A Russian mobster. One of multiple villains originating from the Punisher story arc "The Slavers".
- Aubert Pallascio as Tiberiu Bulat: Cristu's father. One of multiple villains originating from the Punisher story arc "The Slavers".

Other actors in smaller roles include Larry Day as FBI Special Agent-in-Charge Miller, Ron Lea as NYPD Captain Ross, Tony Calabretta as Soap's partner Detective Saffiotti, John Dunn-Hill as Don Gaitano Cesare, Bjanka Murgel as Jigsaw's girlfriend (credited as "Arm Candy"), Cas Anvar as Jigsaw's plastic surgeon, and Edward Yankie as the priest Father Mike.

== Production ==
=== Development ===
In February 2004, two months prior to The Punisher's theatrical debut, Lions Gate Entertainment announced the studio's intent to produce a sequel. Avi Arad, chairman and CEO of Marvel Studios, expressed his interest in developing the franchise, saying that the second film would "become the fifth Marvel property to become a sequel." In March, the director of the first film, Jonathan Hensleigh, said that he was interested in working with Thomas Jane again for The Punisher 2. In April, Jane said that the villain for The Punisher 2 would be Jigsaw. In November, Jane said that the studio was interested in making a sequel based on successful DVD sales of The Punisher and was developing the preliminary budget for the follow-up.

In March 2005, Marvel Studios announced a 2006 theatrical release date for The Punisher 2. In April, Lions Gate Entertainment's CEO, Jon Feltheimer, confirmed at LGF's 2005 fiscal third quarter analyst call that the studio had completed its deal to develop The Punisher 2. Prior to July, Arad revealed that the script was being rewritten and that the sequel would start filming within the year. By July, Jane had put on an additional 12 pounds of muscle, and was hoping for filming to start in late 2006.

In March 2006, The Punisher 2 was announced to be produced in Louisiana, being listed in the domestic charter under Louisiana's Secretary of State. In August, Marvel Entertainment revealed a new film slate that included The Punisher 2 on its partial list with production still to be determined. Thomas Jane said that the writer was halfway through a draft and that he believed filming would begin by February 2007. Jane confirmed that the villain Jigsaw, first announced in April 2004, would be in the film. Jane also said that director Jonathan Hensleigh would not be returning to direct the sequel. In addition, Lions Gate Entertainment, amidst the studios returning to New Orleans following Hurricane Katrina, announced that The Punisher 2 would begin filming within the year. In October, Jane said the script was due in a couple of weeks, and that it would be "darker, bloodier and more unfriendly than the first one." In December, the screenplay was being rewritten by screenwriter Stuart Beattie.

It was announced that Kurt Sutter, a writer for The Shield, was involved with the script for The Punisher 2. Sutter said that he had an enjoyable time writing the script for the sequel and that it was going to be very true to the character. In a separate interview, Thomas Jane revealed that a new script had been turned in and everyone was hoping it would work out, as the lack of a good script had been holding up production. He further stated that if everything goes as planned then filming should begin in June or July, but shortly afterward, in a letter to Ain't It Cool News, Jane wrote that he had pulled out of the movie, stating:

What I won't do is spend months of my life sweating over a movie that I just don't believe in. I've always loved the Marvel guys, and wish them well. Meanwhile, I'll continue to search for a film that one day might stand with all those films that the fans have asked me to watch.

On February 14, 2008, Sutter officially removed his name from credit arbitration, stating:

I took my name off the movie for a few reasons. The obvious reason is because I didn't deserve credit. There was very little of my draft that stayed in the shooting script. The one big one they kept, was the set piece where we see how Russo becomes Jigsaw. It's pretty brutal. Glad they kept that.

=== Directing ===
In May 2007, director John Dahl was in talks to direct, but declined, citing a bad script and lack of budget as reasons for passing. In June, it was announced that Lexi Alexander would then take over the role as director as a result. In a December 2008 interview, Alexander revealed that when she first got the Punisher 2 script she passed on the project, but later changed her mind after reading the MAX adult Punisher comics, and getting assurances from Lionsgate that she could give the project a new look and feel – and cast a new actor in the central role of the Punisher. Director Alexander pitched her vision of the film as a throwback to '80s era action films, stating, "I said can we do it like this, and they all said that's exactly what we want to do."

=== Casting ===
On July 21, it was announced that actor Ray Stevenson would play the Punisher in the sequel to the 2004 film. Filming was slated to begin in October 2007 in Montreal. Prior to filming, Stevenson read every available issue of The Punisher MAX, underwent endurance, martial arts, and weapons training with former Force Recon Marines and film fight choreographer Pat E. Johnson. In August, a working title for the film, The Punisher: Welcome Back Frank, was announced. On August 28, Lionsgate announced that the new working name for The Punisher 2 would be Punisher: War Zone. In mid-September, the director announced cast members joining Stevenson with Dash Mihok as Detective Martin Soap, Colin Salmon as Agent Paul Budiansky, and Doug Hutchison as Loony Bin Jim. It was announced on September 25 via The Hollywood Reporter that Dominic West will star as the main antagonist, Jigsaw, and Wayne Knight will play the Punisher's armorer, Microchip. Paddy Considine was considered for the role of Jigsaw in the film, but the offer was retracted and given to West who had previously turned it down. According to Lexi Alexander, Freddie Prinze Jr. also auditioned for the role, but despite being impressed by his audition, was refused by Lionsgate Studios from accepting the part.

=== Filming ===
Filming occurred from October 22 until December 14 in Montreal, Quebec, and in the nearby municipalities of Sainte-Anne-de-Bellevue, Brossard, Terrebonne, and Île Bizard. Principal photography for Punisher: War Zone was completed on December 27.

Filming locations included Lionel-Groulx station, the Five Roses Flour Plant, the Old Port, John Abbott College, the Palais des congrès de Montréal, Chinatown, and the Champlain Bridge. Additional photography took place in Vancouver, British Columbia. A second unit filmed landmark shots in New York City.

In order to evoke the look of the Punisher comics, Lexi Alexander and cinematographer Steve Gainer utilized highly-saturated colored lighting, with only three primary colors on screen at any given time. It was only after production wrapped that Alexander learned that the comics she had been sent had been accidentally printed in the wrong colors. She called the resulting look a "happy accident." Alexander also framed actors on the left or right-hand side of the frame, rather than the center, to evoke the appearance of comic panels.

=== Creative conflicts ===
The film was set for a September 12, 2008, release, but was pushed back three months to December 5, 2008. A teaser trailer was released on June 12, 2008. On July 25, Harry Knowles of Ain't It Cool News wrote an article claiming that Lexi Alexander had been removed as the film's director. A second trailer was revealed to the public at the San Diego ComicCon on the same day. Alexander did not make an appearance at the convention, which caused speculation from the fans who attended the film's panel to question whether her name had been taken off the film. On August 15, website Latino Review reported that Lionsgate would be editing the film to receive a PG-13 rating. The director of photography, Steve Gainer, later claimed that the film would be "R" and that Alexander was still on board the project. On October 3, IGN confirmed that Alexander was not fired from the movie, based on an official statement they received from Lionsgate. In a December 2008 interview, Alexander confirmed that she had had serious battles with Lionsgate, but denied that she was ever officially off the film. "My name was never off, nor would I want it taken off, nor did I ever get a pink slip. The truth is that we had probably the same discussions that any other film has." Despite the much publicized discourse, Alexander says she is "extremely happy" with the final film:

It came at a price, I would say, but I made the film I wanted on the screen. I think personally, in my opinion, it would have been very dangerous to put a compromise on the screen for my own career and for the promises I made to these actors who I talked into joining the film. I don't really care that it was an uphill battle; I'm glad with what's on the screen.

In 2015, Alexander regretted that Lionsgate's control over the film resulted in the finished film's quality, stating,

Marvel was an equal partner, but unfortunately when there were creative decision conflicts, Marvel would let Lionsgate be the tie breaker. I always regretted that I made a Marvel movie this way, because 99% of their notes were much better than the studios and I was more in tune with them.

Alexander also noted that she did not have final cut privilege of the film.

== Music ==
While the film itself was a box office bomb, the soundtrack achieved considerable commercial success, reaching #23 on Billboard's 'Top Independent Albums' chart.

An original score to the film was composed by Michael Wandmacher, whose primary focus in making the score was to "create a definitive musical identity for the Punisher. I knew I needed something dark, relentless and muscular, but I also couldn't forget Frank's humanity, his personal torment and deep sadness. So, I approached the job equally as a fan and as a composer." In order to make the character of Frank Castle seem less one dimensional, Wandmacher decided to include snare cadences and powerful, dynamic ostinatos and slowly rising string repetitions to mimic a relentless entity, like an approaching battalion.

== Release ==
=== Home media ===
Punisher: War Zone was released on Region 1 DVD and Blu-ray on March 17, 2009. It was released on two different versions, a 2-disc special edition with a digital copy, and a standard version featuring both widescreen and fullscreen versions of the film. DVD sales for the film in North America (as of March 2010) was $14,001,953 in revenue from 576,151 units sold.

The film was released on 4K UHD on September 25, 2018.

== Reception ==
=== Box office ===
On its opening weekend, Punisher: War Zone grossed $4,271,451 in 2,508 theaters in the United States averaging $1,703 and ranking #8 at the box office. The film grossed $8,050,977 domestically, making Punisher: War Zone the lowest-grossing film based on a Marvel Comics property, below Elektra and Howard the Duck. It also grossed $2,049,059 internationally, bringing it to $10,100,036 worldwide, making it a box office bomb against its $35 million budget.

=== Critical response ===
Punisher: War Zone received negative reviews by critics for its story, performances (particularly West's), characters, tone and violence, although many praised Stevenson's performance along with some praising its action, style, humor, visuals and faithfulness to the source material. On the review aggregator website Rotten Tomatoes, 29% of 110 critics' reviews are positive, with an average rating of 4.4/10. The website's consensus reads: "Punisher: War Zone recalls the excessively violent, dialogue-challenged actioners of the 1980s, and coincidentally feels two decades out of date." Metacritic, which uses a weighted average, assigned the film a score of 30 out of 100 based on 24 critics, indicating "generally unfavorable reviews". Audiences polled by CinemaScore gave the film an average grade of "B−" on an A+ to F scale.

Roger Ebert of the Chicago Sun-Times awarded the film 2 out of 4 stars, writing, "You used to be able to depend on a terrible film being poorly made. No longer. The Punisher: War Zone is one of the best-made bad movies I've seen." He added that the film's only flaw is "that it's disgusting." Clark Collis of Entertainment Weekly wrote that Ray Stevenson's "character could be called the Not-Much-of-a-Learning Curveinator."

Edward Porter of the UK's Sunday Times gave the film 3 out of 5 stars, writing, "Earning an 18 certificate with its violence, the film is kids' stuff in all other respects: over-the-top shootouts, monstrous and barking-mad villains, a bumbling sidekick and so on. Highly enjoyable tosh." Movie reporter Peter Hartlaub of the San Francisco Chronicle wrote that it is the "best Punisher movie by far. The action is satisfying and the dark story is close to the tone of its Marvel Comics source material."

Comedian Patton Oswalt was a vocal supporter of the film since its release, calling it "THE BEST time I've had at the movies this year." In October 2011, Oswalt hosted a screening of the film in Los Angeles with director Lexi Alexander, and the two discussed the film with Paul Scheer and June Diane Raphael in episode 20 of their podcast How Did This Get Made?

== Video game ==
A tie-in PS3 video game, which shares fonts and models from the film, was released on July 2, 2009, via the PlayStation Network.
