= Punisher =

Marvel Comics fictional character

The Punisher
- Punisher as seen on the variant cover of Punisher Vol. 15 #1 (February 2026). Art by David Marquez and Guru-eFX.

Publication information
- Publisher: Marvel Comics
- First appearance: The Amazing Spider-Man #129 (February 1974)
- Created by: Gerry Conway (writer); John Romita Sr. (artist); Ross Andru (artist)

In-story information
- Full name: Francis "Frank" G. Castle (born Castiglione)
- Species: Human
- Team affiliations: U.S. Marine Corps Force Reconnaissance; Thunderbolts; Savage Avengers
- Notable aliases: Frankencastle
- Abilities: Master marksman, hand-to-hand combatant and martial artist; USMC infantry training; Various special operations training; High pain tolerance

The Punisher is an antihero appearing in American comic books published by Marvel Comics. Created by writer Gerry Conway and artists John Romita Sr. and Ross Andru, the character first appeared in The Amazing Spider-Man #129 (cover dated February 1974) as an adversary of the superhero Spider-Man. Conway conceived the character using Don Pendleton's The Executioner book series and the pulp character The Shadow as primary inspirations. Introduced as a minor antagonist, the character proved unexpectedly popular and began making regular appearances throughout the 1970s. By the early 1990s he was popular enough to support four concurrent monthly series. His popularity declined through the mid-1990s, and writer Garth Ennis later revived interest in the character in the early 2000s, first under the Marvel Knights imprint and then under Marvel's mature-readers Max imprint.

The Punisher is the vigilante identity of Francis G. "Frank" Castle, (Note: Born Castiglione) a Sicilian American veteran of the United States Marine Corps who wages a one-man war on organized crime in New York City. His origin story features his wife and two children being killed by the mob after witnessing a murder in Central Park; when the police failed to prosecute the killers, Castle took justice into his own hands, a vendetta that has continued ever since. He has no superhuman abilities, instead relying on his military training; he is recognized by the white skull on his chest and has been described as obsessed with vengeance.

Punisher stories explore themes including vigilantism and the legacy of the Vietnam War. Major stories include Circle of Blood (1986), Born (2003) and Punisher MAX (2004–2008). Punisher's supporting cast include Microchip, Rachel Cole, Lynn Michaels, and Joe Garrison. His list of enemies includes his archenemy, Jigsaw, and various members of organized crime. Alternate versions of Punisher include the Max imprint incarnation, Jake Gallows of 2099, and Cosmic Ghost Rider. Spider-Man and Daredevil are frequently contrasted with Punisher due to their more restrained approaches to crimefighting.

The Punisher was among the first of a wave of violent antiheroes in American comic books. From the early 2000s, the Punisher's skull emblem was adopted by segments of the U.S. military, law enforcement, and far-right political groups, generating controversy and repeated criticism from Conway. The Punisher has been portrayed in film by Dolph Lundgren in The Punisher (1989), Thomas Jane in The Punisher (2004), and Ray Stevenson in Punisher: War Zone (2008). Jon Bernthal portrays the character in the Marvel Cinematic Universe, first in the second season of Daredevil (2016) and then in the spin-off series The Punisher (2017–2019), the revival series Daredevil: Born Again (2025), the television special The Punisher: One Last Kill (2026), and the film Spider-Man: Brand New Day (2026).

== Publication history ==
=== Creation ===
The Punisher was conceived by Gerry Conway, a writer for The Amazing Spider-Man. Conway was inspired by The Executioner, a popular book series created by author Don Pendleton, in which a Vietnam veteran, Mack Bolan, becomes a mass murderer of criminals after the Mafia-related deaths of his family. He also says that he was partly inspired by The Shadow, "a character who thought he was a law unto himself." While Bolan is portrayed as a hero, the Punisher is initially introduced as an antagonist, with some sympathetic qualities.

Conway created the unique outfit for the character along with John Romita Sr. As Conway recalled in 2002, "In the '70s, when I was writing comics at DC and Marvel, I made it a practice to sketch my own ideas for the costumes of new characters—heroes and villains—which I offered to the artists as a crude suggestion representing the image I had in mind. I had done that with the Punisher at Marvel." Conway had drawn a character with a small death's head skull on one breast. Marvel art director John Romita Sr. took the basic design and enlarged the skull to take up most of the character's chest. Romita said that he was inspired by the Black Terror, a comic-book superhero of the early 1940s.

Stan Lee, then Marvel's editor-in-chief, claimed in 2005 that he had suggested the character's name:

Gerry Conway was writing a script and he wanted a character that would turn out to be a hero later on, and he came up with the name the Assassin. And I mentioned that I didn't think we could ever have a comic book where the hero would be called the Assassin, because there's just too much of a negative connotation to that word. And I remembered that, some time ago, I had had a relatively unimportant character ... [who] was one of [the cosmic antagonist] Galactus' robots, and I had called him the Punisher, and it seemed to me that that was a good name for the character Gerry wanted to write—so I said, 'Why not call him the Punisher?' And, since I was the editor [sic; Lee had been named publisher in 1972], Gerry said, 'Okay.'

=== 1970s ===
Appearing for the first time in The Amazing Spider-Man #129 (Feb. 1974), the Punisher was initially an antagonist of the titular hero. He was portrayed as a bloodthirsty vigilante who had no qualms about killing gangsters, something which most superheroes of the time refrained from doing. In this appearance, the Punisher is determined to kill Spider-Man, whom he views as an undisciplined vigilante. The Punisher himself is unstable and lacking in emotional self-control in this debut, though he is shown as a formidable fighter, skilled marksman, and able strategist. All he reveals about himself is that he is a former U.S. Marine. He has a fierce temper but also shows signs of considerable frustration over his self-appointed role of killer vigilante.

Punisher was introduced as a solo character in a black-and-white magazine, intended for older readers. Marvel Preview #2 (1975), the fifth appearance of the character, reveals the Punisher's earlier name "Frank Castle" and the trauma of his family's murder by Mafia gangsters.

The character was a hit with readers and started to appear on a regular basis, teaming up with both Spider-Man and other heroes such as Captain America and Nightcrawler throughout the 1970s. The character also appeared in a solo story in Marvel Super Action #1 (1976), written by Archie Goodwin; the story depicts the Punisher murdering a femme fatale. Conway said the Punisher's popularity took him by surprise, as he had intended him only as a second-tier character.

=== 1980s ===
One of the most significant early creative milestones for the character was his appearance in Frank Miller's acclaimed run on Daredevil. Miller used the Punisher to contrast two competing philosophies of vigilantism, pitting Castle's absolutism against Daredevil's more socially liberal approach. In an interview, Miller argued that the Punisher is "Batman without the impurities": that, like Batman, he is driven by an unquenchable need to avenge the loss of his loved ones, but lacks the limitation of mercy that Batman places on his actions. Miller believed the Punisher is heroic, but not a role model, because readers should not wish to emulate his behavior. In the pages of Daredevil, the Punisher is particularly cold-blooded; he kills a child involved in the drug trade even after the boy drops his weapon and begs for mercy.

In 1983, Punisher appeared in The Spectacular Spider-Man, written by Bill Mantlo. He was characterized as violently insane and imposing lethal consequences on any perceived offense. The later ongoing series by Grant explained this as an involuntary drug-induced psychosis.

In the mid-1980s, writer Steven Grant and artist Mike Zeck pitched a Punisher miniseries to new Marvel editor Carl Potts, who accepted it, despite much objection from Marvel management. The miniseries, subtitled Circle of Blood, premiered with a January 1986 cover date. While it was bannered on the cover as the first of four, the series had always been intended to be five issues long. The story presents a retcon that explains that many of the Punisher's more extreme and irrational actions to this point were the result of being poisoned with mind-altering drugs, and that his behavior would subsequently be more controlled. An ongoing series, initially by writer Mike Baron and artist Klaus Janson, also titled The Punisher, premiered the following year. Beginning in The Punisher #4 (1987), the Punisher was assisted by a partner, Microchip. Serving as a Q type figure, Microchip supplied the Punisher with high-tech vehicles and equipment, including armored combat "battle vans" specially built and customized for Castle's war on crime. Under Baron's authorship, the Punisher voiced explicitly right-wing political opinions on issues including immigration and law enforcement, a characterization that proved contentious among readers and that later editors would work to walk back.

The success of the initial title inspired an additional ongoing series, The Punisher War Journal, beginning in 1988, and a black-and-white magazine reprinting early stories, The Punisher Magazine (1989–1990). Three miniseries followed during this period (Assassin's Guild (1988), Return to Big Nothing (1989), and Intruder (1989) ) each placing Castle in standalone scenarios outside the main continuity.

=== 1990s ===
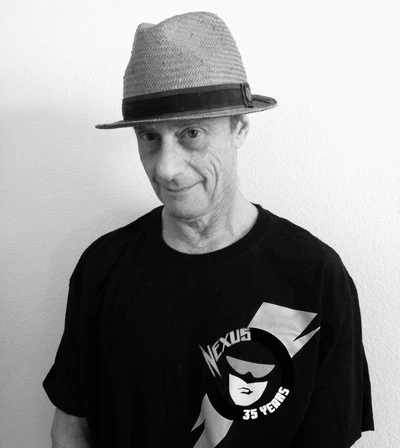
Mike Baron wrote a long run of Punisher stories in the late 1980s and early 1990s.

The popularity of the Punisher led to new series: The Punisher War Zone (41 issues, March 1992 – July 1995) and The Punisher Armory (10 issues, 1990–1994). The Punisher also appeared in numerous one-shots and miniseries, and made frequent guest appearances in other Marvel comics. While these were usually superhero series, he also made a two-issue guest appearance in the generally realistic Vietnam War-era comic The 'Nam (January–February 1991). Chuck Dixon wrote a second appearance of the Punisher in The 'Nam the following year, in a three-issue storyline (#67-69, April–June). In 1992, he featured in a three-issue team-up miniseries with Captain America written by D.G. Chichester and illustrated by Janson, titled Punisher and Captain America: Blood and Glory.

A story arc of 1991–1992 written by Baron in The Punisher, titled "Final Days," saw Castle undergo experimental reconstructive facial surgery, temporarily altering his appearance to that of a Black man, and team up with Luke Cage to fight crack dealers in South Side, Chicago. The arc drew significant criticism for its association with minstrelsy (using the premise of a white protagonist inhabiting a Black body to navigate Black urban spaces as an outsider) and the source of the creative decision remains disputed; Baron has claimed he was following editorial directives.

Over the course of the decade, the character's stories expanded to place him in conflict with nearly every form of organized crime. Due to the Punisher's homicidal nature, few of his foes became recurring antagonists, the most notable of these being the severely-scarred enforcer Jigsaw. The Punisher also acquired a nemesis in the form of the Kingpin, a longtime Spider-Man and Daredevil foe, and continued his conflict with Daredevil himself, who likewise abhorred and fought against the Punisher's brutal methods. Villains such as Doctor Doom and Bullseye would be used to provide more of a challenge for the character, as well as heroes such as Daredevil, Spider-Man, and Wolverine. Often the stories would use the appearance of those heroes to provide commentary on the difference between the Punisher and those more colorful characters.

Punisher Armory was cancelled in 1994. In 1995, writer Steven Grant introduced a new ally to Castle in Punisher War Journal, Lynn Michaels, but later that year Marvel canceled all three remaining Punisher series due to poor sales. The publisher attempted a re-launch almost immediately, with a new ongoing series Punisher, under the new Marvel Edge imprint, by writer John Ostrander, in which the Punisher willingly joined and became the boss of an organized crime family, and later confronted the X-Men and Nick Fury. The series ran for 18 issues, from November 1995 to April 1997. Writer Christopher Golden's four-issue Marvel Knights miniseries The Punisher: Purgatory (November 1998 – February 1999) posited a deceased Punisher resurrected as a supernatural agent of various angels and demons, a version of the character that also appeared in a four-issue mini-series co-starring Wolverine.

=== 2000s ===
A 12-issue miniseries by writer Garth Ennis and artist Steve Dillon, again titled The Punisher (April 2000 – March 2001), under the Marvel Knights imprint, revived the character's popularity. An ongoing series titled The Punisher (37 issues, August 2001 – February 2004), primarily by Ennis and Dillon, followed. The series had a tone of black comedy. In 2004, Ennis began a new ongoing series under Marvel's mature-readers imprint, MAX. Ennis compared his approach to the character to the films Dirty Harry, Death Wish, The Killer, and Léon: The Professional, and disavowed any serious intent to the series's violence, arguing that his only purpose was entertainment. In the course of the series, various characters attempt to emulate the Punisher's murderous approach to justice according to their own value systems, and are themselves killed by the Punisher. Ennis also views the character as similar to Judge Dredd.

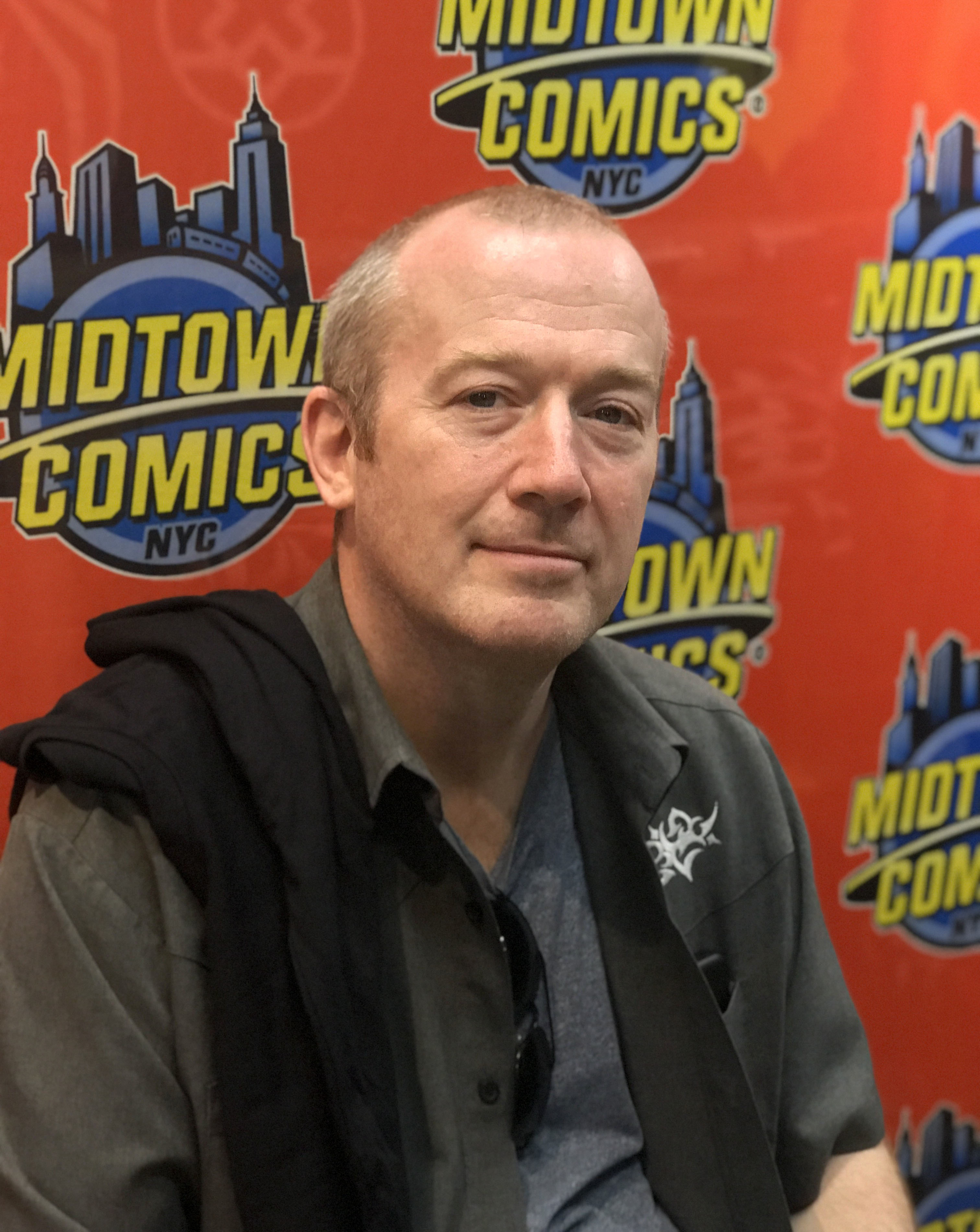
Garth Ennis wrote many Punisher stories in the 2000s.

Continuing his run on the character, Ennis used the freedom of the MAX imprint to write more realistic and hard-edged stories. The first of these was the miniseries Born (2003) by Garth Ennis and Darick Robertson, which further examines Castle's roots, tracing them back to his last tour of the Vietnam War, where he undergoes a psychological transformation into the Punisher to survive a massive assault on his fortification by the combined forces of the Viet Cong and the North Vietnamese Army. Ennis continued the adventures of this alternate version of the character in the series Punisher MAX. Ennis has stated that he would "like to see less superheroes"; this desire is reflected in the gritty, anti-heroic portrayals of both the title character and Nick Fury, who makes guest appearances in the series. Ennis introduces a prominent new recurring villain for Castle, the brutal sadistic mercenary Barracuda. The tone of Ennis' Punisher stories varies widely, from somber, realistic stories to absurdist slapstick. Whereas the traditional Punisher stories remained within the United States and involved antagonists and settings of conventional domestic crime, stories of the MAX Punisher often focus on current events, ranging from corporate fraud to sexual slavery and the war on terror. He also fights white supremacists, such as the Hate-Monger. The one-shot Punisher: The Tyger (2006), by Ennis and John Severin, delved into the MAX version of Castle's life before Vietnam, portraying murders, deaths and criminals from his childhood.

In November 2006, a new Punisher War Journal series, written by Matt Fraction and penciled by Ariel Olivetti, was released. The first three issues are set during Marvel's "Civil War" event, involving Castle taking on supervillains rather than his traditional non-super-powered criminal antagonists. He has also made appearances in the main Civil War series (issues #5–7). Marvel also relaunched the Punisher MAX series without Ennis, launching a new series called PunisherMAX by Jason Aaron and Steve Dillon. As part of his work on the character, Rick Remender wrote the one-shot title Dark Reign: The List – Punisher, which, as part of the "Dark Reign" storyline, shows the character dismembered and decapitated by Daken.

=== 2010s ===
The main Punisher series was renamed FrankenCastle and featured a Castle resurrected by Morbius and the Legion of Monsters as a patchwork, Frankenstein-like creature. He joins up with the Legion of Monsters to help protect the monsters of Monster Metropolis from a group of monster-hunting samurai. At the conclusion of the series, the character was transformed back into a normal human when he acquired the mystical Bloodstone. The fantastical tone of the series was controversial among fans.

In 2010, a five-part Punisher series was released, titled Punisher: In the Blood; in this series, the Punisher faces Jigsaw once again.

In 2011, Greg Rucka retconned Castle's military experience to the Gulf War. He explained:

"Steve [Wacker, editor on the project] and I went round and round on this, but ultimately, he wanted to make Frank younger because if he fought in Vietnam, he's in his 70s, and I get more mileage out of him being in his early 40s. I don't think that takes anything away from his origin. In the Marvel Universe, the conflict matters only because he was asked to go and serve his country, and he did. When he returned, the society he was essentially defending betrayed him and murdered his wife and children in front of him. The conflict matters less than the fact that he gave his service, and this was the reward. In that broad brush vague Marvel Universe sense there's always 'the war' whatever it was. If that put him in the Middle East rather than South East Asia, I think that matters less for the purposes of the Marvel Universe."

He also clarified that the retcon was only for the character in the main Marvel universe and not for the version in the MAX Comics, that retained the first origin. The conflict was retconned again in 2019, in History of the Marvel Universe #2, to the fictional Siancong War.

Rucka wrote a number of stories for both The Punisher (vol. 9) and Punisher War Zone (vol. 3), introducing and chronicling the story of Rachel Cole-Alves, a female ally of the Punisher whose husband and friends were murdered at their wedding.

The Punisher became a member of Thunderbolt Ross's Thunderbolts (2013–2014), with their first mission targeting a civilian-murdering dictator of an island nation. He developed an intimate relationship with his teammate Elektra that lasted 25 issues. As a part of All New Marvel Now, a 2014 Punisher solo series written by Nathan Edmondson and illustrated by Mitch Gerads followed Castle to Los Angeles as he pursued a drug trail and was targeted by a military hit squad. Ennis wrote a sequel to his earlier Born miniseries, The Platoon, published in 2017.

In 2017, during the Secret Empire storyline, the Punisher briefly allied with a Hydra-aligned impostor posing as Captain America, an act he later acknowledged in inner monologue as probably the worst mistake of his life. He subsequently atoned for his involvement by targeting Hydra agents. In a separate storyline, Nick Fury directed Castle to steal the War Machine armor in order to overthrow the dictator of a Central Asian country. The main comic, The Punisher, was relaunched in 2018 by writer Matthew Rosenberg and artist Riccardo Burchielli, continuing to place the character in international conflicts in an ill-fated campaign against Baron Zemo.

Also in 2018, an alternate version of the character with supernatural powers, Cosmic Ghost Rider, appeared in his own miniseries.

=== 2020s ===
A new 12-issue series began in 2022, written by Jason Aaron with art by Jesús Saiz and Paul Azaceta, depicting Castle as an assassin serving the ninja organization The Hand. The series was partly designed as a response to the widespread appropriation of the Punisher's skull symbol by far-right organizations in the United States: Castle adopts a new emblem inspired by the Japanese mythological demon Oni, replacing a logo that had come to represent extrajudicial violence with one drawn from an entirely different cultural tradition.

Following the conclusion of the Aaron series, a new Punisher volume began publication in November 2023, written by David Pepose, illustrated by Dave Wachter, with covers by Rod Reis. The series follows Joe Garrison, a former S.H.I.E.L.D. agent who becomes the new Punisher following Frank Castle's disappearance. This ongoing series was cancelled after only four issues.

In 2025, a five-issue limited series titled Punisher: Red Band, written by Benjamin Percy and illustrated by Marco Checchetto, was published under a polybagged mature-readers format. A new ongoing series by Percy and artist José Luis Soares was subsequently announced, continuing from Red Band with Jigsaw as the primary antagonist, with the first issue scheduled for February 2026.

== Characterization ==
=== Fictional character biography ===
Frank G. Castiglione was born in Queens, New York City, although his family Anglicized their name to Castle after his birth. His parents, Mario Lorenzo "Renzo" Castiglione and Louisa Castiglione, were Italian immigrants from Sicily who worked in the fishing industry (hence, he is first-generation Sicilian American). He studied for the priesthood, but quit because of his inability to forgive major sins. He enlisted in the Marine Corps and served in a foreign war, where he received four Purple Hearts and distinguished himself in combat. He received the nickname "Punisher" in military service. He married a woman named Maria; they had two children, Lisa and Frank Jr. While on leave, Castle and his family witnessed a mob hit on an informant, in Central Park. In response, the criminals attempted to murder the entire family; while his family was lost, Castle survived. While he identified the murderers, the police did not prosecute because the killers had paid for alibis. As a result, Castle took justice into his own hands and killed all of the perpetrators. He then decided that all criminals were indirectly responsible for his loss.

Castle took on the identity of the Punisher, in an ongoing vigilante war against criminals of all kinds in New York City. He entered into conflict with superheroes in the city, particularly Spider-Man and Daredevil. He allied with a former weapons engineer, Microchip, in order to build a state-of-the-art arsenal. However, the two partners had a falling out, and Punisher killed Microchip. In a fight with the mutant Daken, Punisher was killed and cut to pieces. However, he was revived as a monster named Franken-Castle before eventually magically restoring his human life. He partnered with Rachel Cole-Alves, a former marine whose husband and friends had been killed by organized crime. Thunderbolt Ross recruited Castle to join the Thunderbolts. Working together with the group, he began an affair with his teammate Elektra. An evil duplicate of Captain America later convinced Castle to join his attempt to take control of the US. Eventually realizing this mistake, Castle redeemed himself. Nick Fury Jr. then asked Castle to steal the armor originally worn by War Machine in order to overthrow a Central Asian dictator, General Petrov. Castle then came into conflict with the Hand, a mysterious organization of evil ninjas.

=== Personality and motivation ===
The character has been described as being obsessed with vengeance; Garth Ennis noted that the character of the Punisher "sees the world in very black and white terms, he solves his problems with utter finality" and that "his response to any problem: when in doubt, hit back hard."

The stories are inconsistent on the question of whether the Punisher believes in God. The writer Steven Grant believes that his ethos is similar to existentialist thought, noting that:

Heidegger, who took Kierkegaard's philosophy further, comes even closer to describing the Punisher: [paraphrasing] 'Since we can never hope to understand why we're here, if there's even anything to understand, the individual should choose a goal and pursue it wholeheartedly, despite the certainty of death and the meaninglessness of action.' That's sure the Punisher as I conceived him: a man who knows he's going to die and who knows in the big picture his actions will count for nothing, but who pursues his course because this is what he has chosen to do.

The Punisher has his own moral code; he tries to protect and assist people outside the criminal milieu. He has even saved animals from becoming incidental casualties. However, he has occasionally made mistakes and killed innocent people.

Psychologist Andrew Getzfeld has analyzed the character through the lens of abnormal psychology, arguing that Castle fits the diagnostic criteria for Antisocial Personality Disorder (ASPD) as defined by the Diagnostic and Statistical Manual of Mental Disorders: he repeatedly violates the rights of others through aggression, performs behaviors that would constitute grounds for arrest, demonstrates a lack of remorse, and shows disregard for the safety of others. Getzfeld notes, however, that ASPD is typically linked to childhood trauma, and that the relative absence of detailed information about Castle's early years complicates the diagnosis. He concludes that Castle's prognosis for successful treatment would be poor, as patients with ASPD rarely seek treatment voluntarily and tend toward recidivism.

Punisher co-creator Gerry Conway stated that "He's a great Rorschach test. What's given him some sustainability is, you can put into him whatever you want, as opposed to Spider-Man, who truly is who he is and shouldn't be changed. The Punisher is a thin character on his own merits, but that allows for a lot of interpretations and different angles of approach."

Kathleen McClancy points out an emphasis in the stories on Castle's suffering post-traumatic stress disorder, both from his wartime experiences and the loss of his family through violence.

=== Abilities and equipment ===
The Punisher is the recipient of intense infantry training from the United States Marine Corps and special operations training by Force Recon, and he is highly decorated. He received training from the United States Navy SEALs, Underwater Demolition Team, and Long-range reconnaissance patrol teams, and received the Medal of Honor, the Navy Cross, three Silver Stars and Bronze Star medals, four Purple Hearts, and the Presidential Medal of Freedom. From this training, the Punisher is proficient in not only basic infantry and special operations skills, but the use and maintenance of specialized firearms, equipment, and explosive ordnance. He is trained in infiltration into heavily guarded enemy territories and structures for the purpose of assassination, capture, and military intelligence. As a Scout/Sniper he is trained in various forms of camouflage and stealth in different environments. He is also proficient at hand-to-hand combat, and has been trained in multiple forms of martial arts.

He maintains multiple safehouses and vehicles around the greater New York City area as well as multiple forged identities and bank accounts (most of the funds and equipment aiding him in his work being taken from the criminals he hunts). The Punisher has a Kevlar uniform which protects him from most gunfire, though he can still suffer concussive injury or penetration from sufficient or repeated impacts. The white skull emblem on his chest is used both to intimidate his enemies and to lure their fire to the more heavily protected area of his armor. The design was purportedly taken from a Vietcong sniper. The Punisher uses a large variety of firearms in his war on crime, as well as knives, grenade launchers, and explosives; his weapons are customized with scopes, silencers, and tripods.

== Themes and motifs ==
Punisher stories address moral absolutism, retributive justice, exceptionalism, post-traumatic stress disorder for combat veterans, the legacy of the United States in the Vietnam War, and gun culture in the United States.

=== Vietnam war experience ===
The Punisher was originally created as a Vietnam veteran; while the sliding timeline of the Marvel Universe has changed this historical positioning, his characterization is indelibly marked by perceptions of veterans of that war in US culture. Kathleen McClancy argues that Punisher stories often emphasize the Vietnam War as the real source of the trauma that made Frank Castle become the Punisher, and not the murder of his family. She contends that "his war on crime is presented as a continuation of his earlier war." McClancy argues that the characterization of the Punisher draws from earlier depictions of Vietnam veterans in film; initially, a stereotype of these veterans as psychopaths, first depicted in the 1965 film Motorpsycho but increasingly prevalent in American culture following the Tet Offensive of 1968 and the discovery of the My Lai massacre in 1969. Subsequently, an increasing popular narrative developed that Vietnam veterans had been betrayed by their own government and domestic culture, which refused to give them the support and license necessary to win the war. Later, in the Presidency of Ronald Reagan, Vietnam veterans were more likely to be portrayed as highly skilled and heroic, so-called "SuperVets" such as John Rambo and The A-Team; in this iteration, "the SuperVet's traumatic experiences have hardened him into an unstoppable force of violence." The Punisher draws on these cultural narratives and archetypes. Kent Worcester suggests an analogy with role of World War II in the characterization of Captain America. The representation of the Vietnam War in Punisher comics is varied, but the stories generally present a pessimistic and cynical view of the conflict. In particular, Garth Ennis's stories portray it as a clearly unjust war, rife with criminality.

=== Vigilantism ===
Punisher stories are often inspired by popular books and films that present vigilante anti-heroes, such as Don Pendleton's The Executioner book series (beginning in 1969), the Dirty Harry films (1971–1988), and the Death Wish films (beginning in 1974). Anders Lundgren also compares the Punisher to Mr. A, a similarly ruthless comic-book vigilante created by Steve Ditko in 1967, inspired by the ideas of Ayn Rand. The portrayals of vigilantes in the late 1960s and early 1970s were partly inspired by the significant increase in violent crime between 1969 and 1975. The Punisher became increasingly popular in the same period as the highly publicized case of Bernhard Goetz (which took place between 1984 and 1987), who claimed self-defense when he shot four young men in a New York City subway.

Kent Worcester argues that the Punisher's political and moral philosophy rejects liberal democracy, instead embodying what the German philosopher Carl Schmitt called the friend/enemy distinction; the principle, set out in Schmitt's 1932 essay The Concept of the Political, that political action ultimately reduces to identifying which adversaries must be fought in order to preserve one's form of existence. Worcester characterizes the Punisher's politics as rejectionist, retributive, apocalyptic, and cynical, arguing that the character makes the case that anger is not a destabilizing emotion to be expelled from political life but a clarifying force that allows one to perceive the world without the illusions of the social contract.

Lorrie Palmer situates the Punisher within the traditions of film noir and the Western, arguing that in each of these genres "traditional forces of authority are inadequate, leaving the protagonist to enter into direct confrontation with hostile foes that a society is unable to confront on its own." Palmer argues that, like the antihero of noir and the grittier sort of Western, the Punisher exists "on the periphery of both the community and the wilderness," and represents one of a long line of armed men who take up the mantle of justice when regular law enforcement fails. What distinguishes the Punisher from these earlier figures, Palmer contends, is not his generic role but the extraordinary scale and duration of his campaign of violence. Some authors of Punisher stories depict his recourse to vigilantism as justified, while others do not.

== Supporting characters ==
=== Allies ===
Despite wanting to work alone, the Punisher has a few supporting characters to help fight crime. Microchip, birth name Linus Lieberman, assisted Castle by building and supplying weapons and technology and providing friendship. However, Microchip ultimately turned against the Punisher, and the Punisher killed him. Lynn Michaels, a former police officer, briefly allied with the Punisher and worked as one of the first "female Punishers." Rachel Cole-Alves, a former marine created by writer Greg Rucka and artist Marco Checchetto, first appeared in Punisher #1 (2011). Her fiancé was killed at their wedding when the criminal organization the Exchange opened fire, sending her on a mission of revenge that brought her into conflict with Castle when both attacked the same gathering of Exchange leaders. After she later rescued Castle from another criminal group, Black Spectre, the two formed a working alliance. When Cole-Alves was subsequently tried for murder, she was defended by Matt Murdock before escaping from custody with Castle's help. Daredevil is sometimes one of the Punisher's reluctant allies, as well as his antagonist due to their different philosophies in crime-fighting. He also teamed up, in contingent circumstances, with Captain America, Black Widow, Wolverine, and Spider-Man. He does not usually join teams of superheroes, although at one point he was a member of Thunderbolt Ross's Thunderbolts. In this series, he has a romantic relationship with Elektra.

=== Enemies ===
The Punisher kills his enemies as a matter of course. In 2011, an editor at Marvel revealed that between the mid-1970s and 2011 the character was responsible for the deaths of 48,502 people. Jigsaw is his archenemy. The Punisher pushed Jigsaw through plate glass, permanently scarring his face. Commentators have generally compared Jigsaw to the Joker. Generally speaking, the Punisher fights organized crime, particularly paramilitary drug dealers, rather than individual villains. Other recurring antagonists include Kingpin, Sniper, the Hood, the Russian, Ma Gnucci, G.W. Bridge, and Barracuda.

=== Alternate versions ===
In the Marvel Universe, there are multiple alternate realities in which different versions of prominent characters exist. The Max version of the character is an alternative to the mainstream Marvel Universe version; the MAX universe does not include superheroes and the character's time frame is not revised forward.

In the alternate reality of Thanos, Thanos conquered all the Universe; the Punisher was one of the last casualties during the last stand of the heroes and his soul was subsequently sent to Hell. He signed a deal with Mephisto and became the Cosmic Ghost Rider.

The Marvel 2099 universe, in a possible future, a police officer named Jake Gallows becomes a new Punisher after the murder of his mother, brother and sister-in-law. While he initially follows Frank's old code of justice, he eventually goes mad and becomes Minister of Punishment in Doctor Doom's 2099 government. He is joined by Polly, a lab-bred humanoid who becomes his partner.

Subsequently, Marvel Knights' Punisher 2099, another take on the year 2099, features Cossandra Castle who goes by the alias of Cossandra Natchios. She is the daughter of Frank Castle and Elektra Natchios and has a son named Franklin.

There were different versions of Punisher presented in the stories of What If. In one story, Venom possesses Frank Castle instead of Eddie Brock. With the Punisher as Venom, he goes on a rampage, killing several villains including Tombstone and the Kingpin.

== Reception and legacy ==
The Punisher was one of the first of a wave of comic book anti-heroes. As psychologist Suzana E. Flores describes it, an antihero is "often psychologically damaged, simultaneously depicted as superior due to his superhuman abilities and inferior due to his impetuousness, irrationality, or lack of thoughtful evaluation." Subsequent to the Punisher's appearance, many more such antiheroes became popular in comic books of the 1990s, such as Wolverine, Marv, Spawn, and Deadpool.

The character is controversial. Comics scholar Douglas Wolk describes the Punisher as a "gun-crazy vigilante" who functions as "a wish-fulfillment figure for bloodthirsty creeps," who is nonetheless treated as "uncomplicatedly admirable" in the many Marvel series that featured him in the 1990s. Scholarly reception of the character has engaged with his political and racial dimensions. Marc DiPaolo argues that most Punisher stories "strive for a realism that appears to endorse the Punisher's actions, and a radical form of conservatism," contending that the comics carry a racist overtone in the character's apparent preference for non-white antagonists, and situating the franchise alongside 1970s and 1980s exploitation cinema and rape-revenge narratives as products of the period's conservative backlash culture. DiPaolo places the Punisher within a broader tradition of Italian American crime fighters in popular culture, comparing Castle to figures such as Columbo and the real-life undercover agent Joe Pistone. He argues the character is defined by a self-destructive relationship to his own ethnic community: Castle, born Frank Castiglione to Sicilian immigrants, wages his war primarily against the Mafia responsible for his family's deaths. DiPaolo characterizes this as a form of self-loathing, arguing the Punisher represents Italian Americans "at their worst." Worcester disputes this reading, arguing that terms like "conservative" or "reactionary" do not quite apply to a character who is largely indifferent to ordinary political discourse and whom Worcester characterizes as anti-modern rather than conventionally political. Worcester contends that what makes the Punisher ideologically significant is not the opinions he expresses or the selection of his targets, but the larger argument the character embodies: that anger is righteous, that it clarifies rather than distorts, and that it belongs in the public realm.

Empire named the Punisher one of the "greatest comic-book characters", identifying the character as a fan favourite; the magazine locates the character's popularity in the cynicism and violence of popular culture following the 1970s. Empire also argues that Ennis's stories for the MAX label provide the fullest exploration of the character's significance. Tom Shapira of The Comics Journal also praises Ennis's MAX series, calling it "art with a capital A." While the Punisher Armory series has been generally dismissed by critics, comics writer Ian Thomas, also of The Comics Journal, characterizes it as "sterile and chilling," "more disquieting than just about anything else in the canon." Thomas also speaks to the widespread popularity of the character across different demographic groups, and particularly the common adoption of the Punisher skull icon across popular culture.

=== Military, police, and political organizations ===
From the early 2000s, the Punisher's skull emblem was adopted by US military personnel, law enforcement agencies, and political organizations, a use that generated sustained public controversy.

The skull became visible in the US military during the Iraq War. Navy SEALs of SEAL Team 3 painted it on equipment during the Second Battle of Fallujah in 2004, and the practice was later described in detail by SEAL Chris Kyle in his 2012 autobiography American Sniper. In 2018, incoming Australian Defence Force chief Angus Campbell issued a directive banning the symbol from the Australian military alongside other skull-based imagery, citing incompatibility with professional military ethics. In the Philippines, Rodrigo Duterte acquired the nickname "the Punisher" during his time as mayor of Davao City, a reference to his public endorsement of extrajudicial killings of suspected drug users that followed him into the presidency in 2016. In the 2020s, the logo also became common in the Israeli military.

From the mid-2010s, the skull appeared on merchandise, vehicle decals, and uniform patches associated with the Blue Lives Matter movement. A 2017 incident in which a Kentucky police department applied the skull to patrol cars drew national attention after the public complained and the department removed the decals. The symbol also appeared at the 2017 Unite the Right rally in Charlottesville, Virginia, and was worn by participants in the January 6 United States Capitol attack of 2021.

Punisher co-creator Gerry Conway criticized the law enforcement use of the skull repeatedly from 2017 onward, arguing that police displaying the symbol were "basically siding with an enemy of the system," since the Punisher is defined by his rejection of institutional justice rather than his support for it. In June 2020, following the George Floyd protests, Conway launched "Skulls for Justice," an initiative in which artists redesigned the skull in support of Black Lives Matter organizations; the campaign raised over $75,000. Fellow Punisher writer Mike Baron took the opposite position, advocating for the character to represent conservative politics including restrictive immigration policy.

Marvel responded to the controversy in The Punisher Vol. 12 #13 (July 2019), written by Matthew Rosenberg, in which Castle destroys a police officer's skull decal and tells him: "We're not the same. You took an oath to uphold the law. You help people. I gave that up a long time ago." In 2020, Marvel stated publicly that this scene was the company's official position on law enforcement use of the logo. In 2022, a new series written by Jason Aaron replaced the skull with a design drawn from Japanese oni folklore, explicitly intended to sever the emblem from its political associations. The original skull returned with Punisher: Red Band in 2025.

== In other media ==
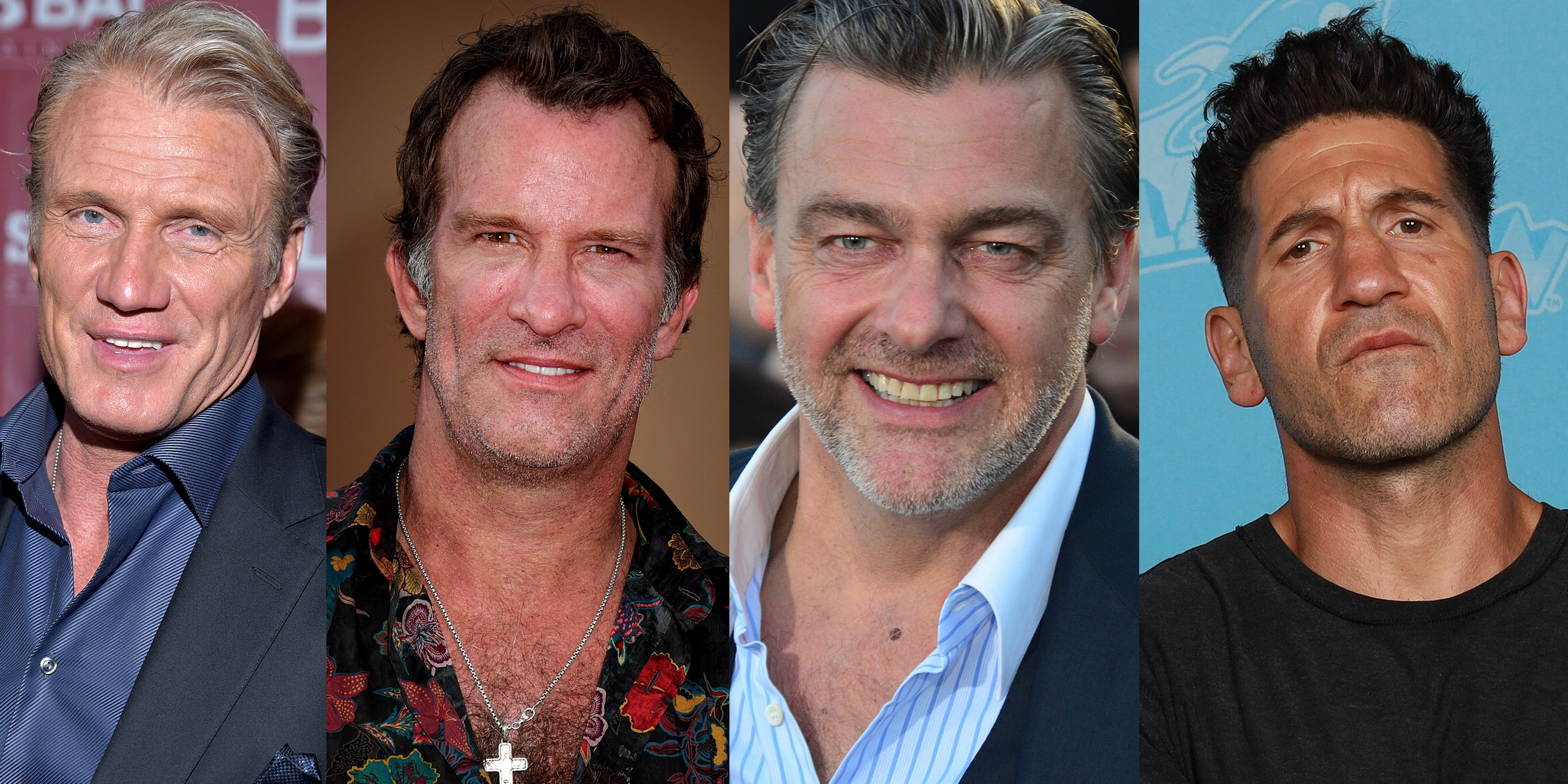
The actors that have portrayed the Punisher in live action: Dolph Lundgren, Thomas Jane, Ray Stevenson, and Jon Bernthal

The character of the Punisher has appeared in many types of media. Since his first appearance in 1974, he has appeared in television, films, an animated movie, and fan films. He has also appeared in video games, and his name, symbol, and image have appeared on products and merchandise. The Punisher made his first film appearance in a self-titled 1989 film, wherein he is portrayed by Dolph Lundgren. The film was released theatrically internationally but straight to video in North America by Live Entertainment in 1989. This version of the character is notable for lacking the signature skull logo from the comics. Marvel hired Jonathan Hensleigh to write and direct the 2004 film, starring Thomas Jane. The film was mainly based on two Punisher comic book stories; The Punisher: Year One and Welcome Back, Frank.

A direct sequel to the 2004 film was supposed to follow based on strong DVD sales, but the lack of a good script kept the project in development for over 3 years, and by the end both Jonathan Hensleigh and Thomas Jane pulled out. In June 2007, Lexi Alexander was hired to direct and Ray Stevenson was hired in July to play the Punisher in the newly titled Punisher: War Zone, which became a reboot, and not a sequel to 2004's The Punisher.

In October 2013, Marvel and Disney announced that Marvel Television and ABC Studios would provide Netflix with live-action series centered around the Marvel Comics characters Daredevil, Jessica Jones, Iron Fist, and Luke Cage, leading up to a miniseries based on the Defenders. In June 2015, Marvel announced that Jon Bernthal had been cast as Frank Castle / The Punisher for the second season of Daredevil. A spin-off series centered on the character had entered development by January 2016. The series, The Punisher, was officially ordered that April, and the first season was released on Netflix in November 2017. Bernthal reprised his role as Castle in the first season of the revival series Daredevil: Born Again (2025), the Marvel Television Special Presentation's The Punisher: One Last Kill television special (2026), and in the film Spider-Man: Brand New Day (2026).
