= The Punisher season 1 =

The Punisher
- Season 1
- Promotional poster
- Showrunner: Steve Lightfoot
- Starring: Jon Bernthal; Ebon Moss-Bachrach; Amber Rose Revah; Daniel Webber; Jason R. Moore; Michael Nathanson; Ben Barnes; Paul Schulze; Jaime Ray Newman; Deborah Ann Woll
- No. of episodes: 13

Release
- Original network: Netflix
- Original release: November 17, 2017

Season chronology
- Next → Season 2

The first season of the American television series The Punisher, which is based on the Marvel Comics character Punisher, follows Frank Castle as he uncovers a conspiracy while seeking revenge for the deaths of his family. It is set in the Marvel Cinematic Universe (MCU), sharing continuity with the franchise's films and other television series. The season was produced by Marvel Television in association with ABC Studios and Bohemian Risk Productions, with Steve Lightfoot serving as showrunner.

Jon Bernthal stars as Castle, reprising his role from the series Daredevil (2015–2018), alongside Ebon Moss-Bachrach, Amber Rose Revah, Daniel Webber, Jason R. Moore, Michael Nathanson, Ben Barnes, Paul Schulze, Jaime Ray Newman, and Deborah Ann Woll. Development on The Punisher as a spin-off from Daredevil began by January 2016, and it was ordered to series in April. Lightfoot was announced as executive producer and showrunner, with Bernthal and Woll set to reprise their roles from Daredevil. Filming took place in New York City from October 2016 to April 2017. Practical effects were augmented by the visual effects department, including the addition of muzzle flashes and gore to the fight scenes. The season explores post-traumatic stress disorder for military veterans and depicts different perspectives on the United States gun control debate.

The season premiered in New York City on November 6, 2017, and all thirteen episodes were released on Netflix on November 17. A surprise release had been planned to follow the series' New York Comic Con panel in October, but this was cancelled following the Las Vegas shooting that month. The season received mixed reviews from critics. It also received some accolades, including a Primetime Creative Arts Emmy Award nomination for its stunts. A second season was ordered in December 2017.

== Episodes ==
No. overall	No. in season	Title	Directed by	Written by	Original release date
1	1	"3AM"	Tom Shankland	Steve Lightfoot	November 17, 2017
Marine veteran Frank Castle, as the "Punisher", kills the last members of the gangs who killed his family. Six months later, Castle is awakened at 3:00 every morning by nightmares of his family's deaths. He passes his time at a demolition job breaking down a building in New York City, angering other workers who are denied extra pay due to Castle's overtime. He also visits his military friend Curtis Hoyle, who leads a support group for veterans, and mentions that his time in Afghanistan involved activities that he does not want to discuss. A new worker, Donny Chavez, is eager to please and attempts to befriend Castle. He agrees to help some of the other workers steal money from the Gnucci Crime Family, but during the heist he accidentally reveals his identity to the gangsters. The other workers bring Chavez to the worksite and attempt to kill him, but Castle is there and kills them first. He then kills the gangsters before they can hunt down Chavez. DHS agent Dinah Madani plans to investigate Castle's Kandahar unit, believing they are responsible for the death of Afghan police officer Ahmad Zubair.
2	2	"Two Dead Men"	Tom Shankland	Steve Lightfoot	November 17, 2017
A man calling himself "Micro" monitors cameras around the city and tracks Castle from where he murdered the gangsters. He contacts Castle and tells him to look at a disc that he left at Castle's old family home, which contains footage of Castle's unit torturing and killing Zubair in Kandahar. That video was originally sent to Madani before going missing, and now she wants to discuss Castle, who is believed to be dead, with his Marine friend Billy Russo. Special Agent in Charge Carson Wolf tells Madani to drop the investigation. She gets around this by convincing him to use Russo's private military company Anvil for field training, where she talks to Russo. Castle's journalist friend Karen Page investigates Micro, actually former NSA analyst David Lieberman who was supposedly killed after leaking secrets. Wolf covered up the story. Castle tortures and kills Wolf, who says Castle and his family were targeted due to the leaked footage. Castle draws out Lieberman by visiting his wife Sarah and getting hit by her car. With Hoyle's help, Castle sneaks into Lieberman's base of operations at an abandoned power station.
3	3	"Kandahar"	Andy Goddard	Steve Lightfoot	November 17, 2017
Castle tortures Lieberman and learns that as an NSA analyst, Lieberman was sent the video of Zubair's murder for assessment and chose to leak it to Madani. Wolf hunted down Lieberman, shot him, and framed him as a criminal. The shot hit Lieberman's cellphone, allowing him to survive and go into hiding. Lieberman gets the upper hand on Castle, who explains that in Kandahar he and Russo were selected as team leaders of a special unit, Cerberus, that was used by a mysterious official nicknamed "Agent Orange" to kill high value targets, including Zubair. After being sent into a clear ambush by the agent, Castle saved Russo, Major Ray Schoonover, and other members of Cerberus by going on a killing spree. Castle later attacked the agent, damaging his eye, and both he and Russo left the unit. Now, Castle agrees to work with Lieberman to find and kill those behind Cerberus. Hoyle and Russo visit Castle's grave to commemorate his birthday; Hoyle does not reveal that Castle is still alive. Lewis Wilson, a struggling veteran from Hoyle's support group, accidentally shoots at his father Clay.
4	4	"Resupply"	Kari Skogland	Dario Scardapane	November 17, 2017
Wilson digs a foxhole in his yard, concerning his father and Hoyle. He applies to work for Anvil, but Hoyle convinces Russo not to hire him out of concern for Wilson's mental health. Requiring weapons and ammunition, Castle asks Lieberman to search law enforcement databases for known gun shipments. Castle follows a lead on a large shipment to dealer Turk Barrett and learns that the delivery has been routed to a single buyer. He also visits Sarah to help her with an insurance claim on her car. Madani, now acting special agent in charge, wishes to investigate Wolf's murder after learning that he was corrupt, but is told not to by Rafael Hernandez, her mentor and DHS director of operations. Instead, she helps coordinate an operation with her partner, Sam Stein, to intercept the large gun shipment and arrest those involved. After Lieberman hacks their plans, he and Castle are able to hijack the weapons in the middle of the operation. They are pursued by Madani until Lieberman crashes into her vehicle. Castle pulls her from the wreckage, revealing himself to her and confirming that he killed Wolf.
5	5	"Gunner"	Dearbhla Walsh	Michael Jones-Morales	November 17, 2017
Castle helps Sarah with her car and accepts an offer to have dinner with her. Despite being told to rest and recover, Madani is intent on continuing her investigation into Castle's unit and interviews Page. Madani and Stein do not tell their superiors about Castle, but her office is bugged and "Agent Orange", who is really CIA covert operations director William Rawlins, hears their discussion about finding Cerberus soldiers. Rawlins is asked by CIA Deputy Director Marion James to be her deputy when she is promoted. Deducing that the leaked footage was filmed by Cerberus soldier Gunner Henderson, Castle and Lieberman go to his remote cabin in Kentucky, missing Sarah's dinner. Henderson says he leaked the footage after learning that Cerberus's leaders were using the bodies of American soldiers to smuggle heroin. Rawlins sends soldiers to kill Henderson and discovers that Castle is alive. Castle and Henderson kill the attackers with Lieberman's guidance, but both are seriously injured. Lieberman gets Castle to safety but Henderson dies. Madani meets with Russo for drinks and they have sex.
6	6	"The Judas Goat"	Jeremy Webb	Christine Boylan	November 17, 2017
Lieberman calls the local authorities to find Henderson's body, and gets Hoyle's help to tend to Castle's injuries. Madani hears about Henderson and goes to investigate, finding Castle's blood on the scene. Wilson is arrested while protesting for the right to bear arms with O'Connor, a veteran that Wilson admires. Hoyle bails out Wilson when O'Connor abandons him, and reveals that O'Connor never actually served and has been lying about his record. Russo realizes that Madani is using him to get information on Castle, and she tells him that Castle is alive. Russo broadcasts radio signals trying to find Castle and talks to Hoyle, who claims not to have known. Castle meets with Russo, explaining the truth behind Cerberus and that he wanted to protect those close to him by pretending to be dead. Wilson confronts O'Connor about his lies, leading to a fight in which Wilson fatally stabs O'Connor. Castle visits Sarah and apologizes for missing dinner. Russo, who is secretly working with Rawlins, offers to help Castle move overseas and start a new life, but Castle chooses to continue his mission.
7	7	"Crosshairs"	Andy Goddard	Bruce Marshall Romans	November 17, 2017
Wilson considers killing himself before secretly making a pressure cooker bomb. Russo tells Madani that he does not believe Castle is alive. She realizes that Henderson was only targeted after she and Stein discussed him, and that her office may be bugged; Madani and Stein find the device. Castle and Lieberman target Colonel Morty Bennett, one of the leaders of Cerberus, hoping that he can tell them who "Agent Orange" is. Rawlins and Russo expect this and plan a trap, and Rawlins admonishes Russo for not killing Castle when he had the chance. Castle infiltrates the military base where Bennett lives, allowing Lieberman to hack Bennett's phone. Russo and some of his men attack Castle wearing masks. Castle and Russo shoot at each other, and Castle is able to escape. He is forced to injure a young soldier on his way out. They track Bennett's phone to a CIA safehouse where he meets with Rawlins and Russo. They tell him that he can leave the country and start a new life, but Russo kills Bennett on Rawlins's orders. Castle attempts to shoot Rawlins, but he is standing behind bullet-proof glass.
8	8	"Cold Steel"	Antonio Campos	Felicia D. Henderson	November 17, 2017
Russo visits his mother in a psychiatric hospital and injects her with meth, keeping her addicted to it. He tells Madani that he grew up in the system and never looked for his mother. The cameras that Lieberman uses to keep watch on his family go down and Castle investigates, finding that Sarah disconnected the internet as punishment for their son, Zach. Castle reconnects the internet and has drinks with Sarah, who kisses him but regrets it. Lieberman gets drunk after seeing this and decides to take what they know to Madani, so Rawlins can be arrested and he can return to his family. Sarah asks Castle to intervene with Zach and he realizes that the boy needs a father figure. Castle stops Lieberman from going to Zach by agreeing to talk with Madani. Next to the bug in her office, Madani and Stein organize an operation with a fake plan to capture Castle. Russo and a team of mercenaries go to the location of the operation planning to kill Castle. They are ambushed by DHS agents and the mercenaries are all killed, but Russo kills Stein and escapes. He later consoles Madani over Stein's death.
9	9	"Front Toward Enemy"	Marc Jobst	Angela LaManna	November 17, 2017
Castle and Lieberman stake out Madani's apartment, where she continues to grieve for Stein. They are interrupted when bombs go off nearby, killing several people. Wilson takes responsibility in an anonymous letter he sends to Page, hoping that she will champion him and his pro-gun ideas just as she championed Castle. Page publishes the letter in the New York Bulletin with a rebuttal, and goes on a radio show with anti-gun senator Stan Ori to further argue against Wilson's actions. Wilson calls in to defend himself, and both Hoyle and Castle recognize his voice. After visits from Hernandez and Russo, Madani decides to reveal the truth about her investigation at Stein's funeral. Hoyle finds Wilson at O'Connor's house and tries to talk him down, but Wilson beats him and connects him to explosives. Castle arrives and convinces Wilson to let Hoyle go rather than blow him up when police arrive. Meanwhile, Lieberman finds Madani on her way to the funeral and tells her about Rawlins. Castle is caught on camera leaving O'Connor's house and the media broadcasts that he is alive and a potential terrorist.
10	10	"Virtue of the Vicious"	Jim O'Hanlon	Ken Kristensen	November 17, 2017
Ori hires Anvil as security at a hotel where he plans a fundraiser for victims of the bombings. Wilson kills Isaac Lange, a member of Hoyle's support group who works for Anvil, and uses his uniform to infiltrate the hotel. Madani tells Hernandez everything she knows, and he informs her that the mercenaries were all former Anvil employees. Madani questions Russo at the hotel while Page interviews Ori before the fundraiser. Wilson attacks, killing Anvil employees and almost killing Ori. Castle intervenes, but Wilson is wearing an explosive belt with a dead man's switch and takes Page hostage. Wilson and Page take an elevator while Castle runs down the stairs until he is confronted by Madani and Russo. Russo shoots at Castle and refuses to let Madani arrest him; she suspects Russo killed Stein while Castle realizes that Russo betrayed him. Police arrive and distract Russo and Madani. Castle finds Wilson and Page, helps Page get free, lets Wilson blow himself up, and escapes. Detective Sergeant Brett Mahoney investigates and interrogates the survivors, including Russo, Ori, Madani, and Page.
11	11	"Danger Close"	Kevin Hooks	Felicia D. Henderson	November 17, 2017
Russo publicly disavows Castle. Rawlins tells James that they need to kill Castle to protect the CIA. Zach calls a police tipline to report Castle, and Rawlins sends men to capture him and Sarah. Castle wants to end his partnership with Lieberman after the latter went to Madani alone, but they work together when they see what happens to Sarah and Zach. Castle sends Lieberman to get his daughter Leo, who hid from Rawlins's men, while Castle prepares for an assault on the power station. He dons the white skull symbol of the Punisher. Madani confronts Russo about Stein's death, but he feigns ignorance. She convinces Hernandez to take further action and they go to James, telling her about Rawlins and Cerberus. Russo sends a group of soldiers to the power station and Castle kills them all. James confronts Rawlins and he offers up Russo as a scapegoat to clear the name of the CIA, which she accepts on the condition that he resigns. Castle and Madani meet up with Lieberman and Leo, while Russo goes to the power station and sees Lieberman's computers are locked and have a countdown.
12	12	"Home"	Jet Wilkinson	Dario Scardapane	November 17, 2017
Castle makes a deal with Russo to swap himself and Lieberman for Sarah and Zach. Madani records Castle's testimony, but Lieberman says he will only do so if DHS fakes his death so he can be reunited with his family. During the swap, Russo's men take Castle, Lieberman is presumed dead, and Madani gets Sarah and Zach to safety. Lieberman later reunites with his family and tries to explain everything. At the power station, Rawlins and Russo torture Castle, not knowing that their actions are being recorded. Castle has hallucinations of his wife Maria, and must decide whether to join her or continue living. Despite promising to let Castle finish the mission his way, Lieberman worries about him and reveals the location of the base to Madani. Russo promises to kill Castle quickly in exchange for him unlocking the computers, which allows them to erase all of Lieberman's files, but Rawlins continues to sadistically torture Castle and tries to cut out one of his eyes as retribution. Russo helps Castle get free and Castle kills Rawlins. Russo then tries to kill Castle, but Madani arrives in time to stop him.
13	13	"Memento Mori"	Stephen Surjik	Steve Lightfoot	November 17, 2017
Madani takes Castle to her father, a doctor, who saves Castle's life. She chooses not to report where Castle is, and is ordered not to take any further action. Russo kills several DHS agents and takes Hoyle hostage. He has a standoff with Castle which ends with them agreeing to meet that night at the Central Park carousel where Castle's family were killed. Madani tracks Castle's phone and decides to follow him. Russo takes two young employees hostage at the carousel, drawing out Castle. As they fight, Madani arrives and is shot in the head by Russo. Castle gets the upper hand but chooses not to kill Russo, instead smashing Russo's face into glass to permanently disfigure him. Castle is taken into custody while Madani and Russo are taken to a hospital; both survive. Three days later, Hernandez and James free Castle with a clean slate, giving him a chance at a new life per Madani's request. Russo is blamed for his crimes. After depositions and testimonials, Lieberman returns to his family home. Castle joins Hoyle's support group and says he is scared now that he no longer has a war to fight.

== Cast and characters ==
=== Main ===
- Jon Bernthal as Frank Castle / Punisher
- Ebon Moss-Bachrach as David Lieberman / Micro
- Amber Rose Revah as Dinah Madani
- Daniel Webber as Lewis Wilson
- Jason R. Moore as Curtis Hoyle
- Michael Nathanson as Sam Stein
- Ben Barnes as Billy Russo
- Paul Schulze as William Rawlins / Agent Orange
- Jaime Ray Newman as Sarah Lieberman
- Deborah Ann Woll as Karen Page

=== Recurring ===
- Shohreh Aghdashloo as Farah Madani
- Jordan Mahome as Isaac Lange
- Kelli Barrett as Maria Castle
- Aidan Pierce Brennan as Frank Castle Jr.
- Nicolette Pierini as Lisa Castle
- Ripley Sobo as Leo Lieberman
- Kobi Frumer as Zach Lieberman
- Tony Plana as Rafael Hernandez

=== Notable guests ===
- Geoffrey Cantor as Mitchell Ellison
- Clancy Brown as Ray Schoonover
- Rob Morgan as Turk Barrett
- Royce Johnson as Brett Mahoney

== Production ==
=== Development ===
By January 2016, ahead of the Daredevil season two release, Netflix was in "very early development" on a spin-off series titled The Punisher, and was looking for a showrunner. The series would be centered on Jon Bernthal as Frank Castle / Punisher, and was described as a stand-alone series apart from those leading up to The Defenders crossover event. That April, Netflix officially ordered a full 13-episode season of The Punisher, confirmed Bernthal's involvement, and named Steve Lightfoot as executive producer and showrunner. Asked whether he would rather have a 10-episode season given the longer 13 episode-seasons have been criticized for other Marvel Netflix series, Lightfoot said that he wanted the season to be a "slow burn show" that was character-driven, and that he felt they had the right amount of story to fill the 13 episodes.

=== Writing ===
Lightfoot had a loose idea of what the "journey of Season 1" would be when he joined the series, and this was fleshed-out and altered in the writers room throughout work on the season. Executive producer Jeph Loeb said the season would ask the questions "Who is Frank? What is Frank going to do? And who's going to try and stop Frank?" Lightfoot chose not to adapt any specific version of the character from the comics and instead looked to the work that was done in Daredevil defining the character. That series' depiction was what got Lightfoot interested in the character, and he wanted it to dictate this series' direction. The Punisher begins with a teaser featuring Castle killing the gang members that he believes are responsible for his family's death, which is a conclusion to the character's story in Daredevil. The series then jumps ahead to the character "stuck in the past and sort of crippled by this grief". The season also depicts some events from before the second season of Daredevil, which Bernthal described as being "loose with chronology"; this includes an explanation of Castle's time serving in Kandahar, which had been mentioned in Daredevil and was something that Lightfoot felt this series should address.

As a fan of Westerns and 1970s urban thrillers, Lightfoot felt that the series should combine those ideas due to Castle's antihero persona being an archetype of Western films but set in the urban environment of New York City. Lightfoot looked to films from those genres as inspiration for tone and style, ideas, and themes for the series, and also looked to 1970s conspiracy thriller films due to Castle being a fugitive in the series and the general sense of paranoia. The series makes a reference to Marathon Man (1976), while Lightfoot described the first episode of the series as a modern "updating" of Shane (1953). Lightfoot also took inspiration from the Bourne film series and the film American Sniper (2014) for the series. Regarding his previous television series Hannibal, Lightfoot stated that he learned from that series' creator Bryan Fuller to make an antihero like Hannibal Lecter relatable to the audience by finding "something in them that's universal that we can all feel", such as Lector being lonely. Carrying this over to The Punisher, Lightfoot saw in Castle the idea of "a man whose family was taken from him at a young age" and that a series focused on him should be an exploration of his grief and how he responds to it. Lightfoot felt that even audience members who did not agree with Castle's actions would be able to go on a "journey" with the character if they understood this aspect of him.

"We talked a lot as we developed the show that once you take hold of the hand of violence it's impossible to let it go. That relationship to violence really interested me, not just the fact he has the ability to use it but also the cost of it."

— Showrunner Steve Lightfoot on violence in The Punisher

Rather than show the "beautiful" scenes of horror that were created for Hannibal, Lightfoot wanted to follow the lead of the character's fight scenes in Daredevil by not shying away from the cost of the actual actions, feeling that showing the brutal reality of Castle's actions would better convey to the audience that "This stuff hurts, and it's not OK" rather than glossing over the violence which he felt would have been worse. He elaborated that he was unsure if the series was the most violent Marvel Netflix series, as he was simply taking the level of violence he saw depicted in Daredevil as a baseline for this series, and that it is important to remember that "a lot of what he's doing is wrong. We have to let the audience lose him at times and let him win them back. To just wholeheartedly be behind him wouldn't be right". Despite this, Lightfoot wanted to convey the character's feelings and thoughts to help the audience understand the character, and often used flashbacks or dreams featuring his family since Castle does not talk much and having constant flashbacks also represented how he is unable to stop thinking about them.

Lightfoot described Castle as a metaphor for "the fact that we've been sending men to war for 15 years now and then bringing them back and expecting them to just fit back in. Clearly, that isn't what happens." Having not served in the military himself, Lightfoot spent time with the rest of the series' writers reading first-person accounts and memoirs from real-life war veterans, and the series also had consultants from the military, the Special Forces, and the CIA including one military consultant who read every script of the series and gave notes. Noting that a vocal community of United States soldiers and veterans were fans of the Punisher character, Lightfoot and Bernthal ensured that the series was always respectful of the military and law enforcement despite Castle's actions being generally criminal; Lightfoot said it was an "interesting thing to be respectful of the police and at the same time, the character is beyond the law." Feeling that it was not his place to preach about the politics of vigilantism or the United States gun control debate, Lightfoot wanted to create a "body of characters where you feel like all sides and issues were given a voice so the audience can decide", from a veteran who is a "gentle group-therapy leader" to a "gun nut". When creating an original character for the series to serve as the "tough nemesis cop" who is hunting Castle, Lightfoot decided to "mix the paradigm up" by making the character female and his equal. Lightfoot noted that the writer's room, which included both men and women, had "a lot of fun" with this idea. They also wanted the character to be of Middle Eastern descent and be as big of a patriot as Castle and an action hero in her own right. This character became Dinah Madani. Lightfoot did not want the "spiderweb" of supporting characters in the series to be "sidekicks" to Castle, and instead have "their own narrative and their own story that was the most important thing to them".

=== Casting ===
The main cast for the season includes Jon Bernthal as Frank Castle / Punisher, Ebon Moss-Bachrach as David Lieberman / Micro, Ben Barnes as Billy Russo, Amber Rose Revah as Dinah Madani, Daniel Webber as Lewis Wilson, Paul Schulze as William Rawlins, Jason R. Moore as Curtis Hoyle, Michael Nathanson as Sam Stein, Jaime Ray Newman as Sarah Lieberman, and Deborah Ann Woll as Karen Page. Bernthal and Woll both reprise their roles from Daredevil.

In August 2017, Shohreh Aghdashloo was revealed to be portraying Farah Madani, Dinah's mother, in a recurring role for the season. Also recurring in the season are Jordan Mahome as Isaac Lange, Kelli Barrett as Maria Castle, Aidan Pierce Brennan as Frank Castle Jr., Nicolette Pierini as Lisa Castle, Ripley Sobo as Leo Lieberman, Kobi Frumer as Zach Lieberman, and Tony Plana as Rafael Hernandez. Rob Morgan and Royce Johnson reprise their roles from previous Marvel Netflix series as Turk Barrett and Brett Mahoney, respectively. Geoffrey Cantor and Clancy Brown reprise their respective Daredevil roles as Mitchell Ellison and Ray Schoonover.

In addition to several actors portraying war veterans, including Mahome, the series also cast real-life war veterans as extras and supporting cast for scenes such as support group meetings. Mahome, whose father served in the military, found this to be a powerful experience and helpful for his acting in the series.

=== Design ===
Stephanie Maslansky, who served as costume designer for the first seasons of Daredevil, Jessica Jones, Luke Cage, and Iron Fist, had the choice between designing for The Defenders or for The Punisher due to a scheduling conflict between the two productions, and chose to work on The Defenders. Instead, Lorraine Calvert designed the costumes for The Punisher after introducing the look of the character in the second season of Daredevil; her take on the character's "beloved" comic-inspired costume balances the original design, Bernthal's needs as an actor and interpretation of the character, and Lightfoot's intentions for the tone of the series.

=== Filming ===
Filming began on October 3, 2016, in Brooklyn, New York, under the working title Crime. Locations for the production included Greenpoint, Brooklyn, the Williamsburg Bridge, Columbus Circle and Central Park West, Cortlandt Alley, Circle Line Downtown cruises, the Manhattan Family Court building, Long Island City, Grand Ferry Park in South Williamsburg, Brooklyn, Sunnyside, Queens, Pulaski Bridge, the Roosevelt Island and its steam plant, the Bronx County Courthouse, Newtown Creek, The Roosevelt Hotel, Astoria Park, Tudor City, Hunts Point, Bronx, the Forest Park Carousel, the Bronx–Whitestone Bridge, the "GoodFellas Diner" before it was damaged in a 2018 fire and the Mount Zion Cemetery, both in Maspeth, Queens, and in Astoria, Queens. A car chase for the season was filmed at the Brooklyn Navy Yard in night shoots, with Moss-Bachrach driving one of the cars. Filming for the season wrapped on April 9, 2017.

=== Visual effects ===
Visual effects supervisor Greg Anderson and vendor FuseFX returned from the first season of Luke Cage to create the visual effects for The Punisher, creating 855 visual effects shots across the season. Their team changed in size for each episode, but generally consisted of 15 to 20 people. Due to the realistic tone of the series, which does not feature any superpowers, the visual effects department had to work even harder than usual to ensure their effects were believable, with a focus on creating "gunplay, knifeplay, explosions and other real world effects." They preferred to augment practical effects rather than start from scratch to help with realism as well as the series' budget and schedule.

As an example of the work Fuse did during fight sequences, Anderson discussed the scene where Russo and his men attack Micro's basement. Though practical prop weapons were used for the fight, Fuse had to augment the action with computer generated blood, knives, and muzzle flashes, as well as a computer generated head that is blown apart by a shotgun. The sequence was thoroughly storyboarded and pre-visualized to plan out the exact visuals required. Because the scene, like many others throughout the season, required a dark environment the visual effects team had to work with the cinematography department to decide where the low-light should be practical and where color-grading could be used to alter a more brightly lit set given it is difficult to integrate visual effects with dark images. Conversely to this scene, a sequence such as when Russo blows up a hideout required minimal visual effects work because the explosion was shot practically, with Fuse mainly just adding some windows to the building that were removed for the explosion.

The most technically difficult scene of the season to create was in the first episode, where Castle shoots someone from across the Mexico–United States border. Anderson estimated that the scene was 90 percent digital, with the environment between Castle and his target created entirely by the visual effects department. So that Moore could portray amputee Curtis Hoyle, Fuse had to digitally replace his leg in several shots. This involved Moore wearing a green sleeve over his leg and Fuse replacing it with a stump. The company also had to recreate the background behind Moore's actual leg which was often the most difficult part, such as when he is getting out of bed and realistic-looking digital cloth needed to match with the actual sheets that were on set. Additionally, visual effects were used to augment cement in the sequence where people are thrown into it. The special effects department created a mixture to look like cement for use while filming the scene, but it ultimately did not look realistic on camera and had to be changed digitally.

=== Music ===
In April 2017, Tyler Bates was announced as the composer for The Punisher, after previously composing for Marvel's Guardians of the Galaxy and Guardians of the Galaxy Vol. 2. In order to "get into the dark corners of the Punisher's mind," Bates played "more of a broken blues" guitar, which was augmented with talkbox effects and other "guitar noises", along with guitar-vol and melodica. On this style, Bates said, "The rough edges and broken nature of [music like this] leaves a great deal of space for emotion and interesting color—and a bit of an attitude. Otherwise it's not going to be an authentic expression of the idea. There's a darkness in there that I'm happy to tap into." A soundtrack album for the season was released digitally by Hollywood Records on November 17, 2017, in conjunction with the season's Netflix release. All music composed by Tyler Bates:

The Punisher (Original Soundtrack)
No.	Title	Length
1.	"The Punisher Main Title"	1:15
2.	"Quiet Reflection"	1:44
3.	"The Runaround"	3:11
4.	"Dig Deep"	1:15
5.	"Misdirection"	1:49
6.	"Lewis Gets the Boot"	2:04
7.	"Rampage"	1:14
8.	"Billy Motivates"	1:17
9.	"Hiding Evidence"	2:27
10.	"Judas"	4:09
11.	"Family Dinner"	1:20
12.	"Just in Time"	1:56
13.	"Made an Enemy"	1:13
14.	"Keep It Running"	1:40
15.	"Escape the Base"	3:44
16.	"Like a Soldier"	2:17
17.	"Heads Will Roll"	1:58
18.	"Frank's Choice"	3:36
19.	"Billy's Lair"	1:52
20.	"No More War to Fight"	1:38
21.	"The Punisher End Title"	1:11
Total length:		42:50

== Marketing ==
Bernthal and Woll appeared at New York Comic Con in October 2016 to officially announce the start of production on the series and the latter's involvement, while Bernthal presented exclusive footage from the series at San Diego Comic-Con 2017. A teaser was revealed on Netflix in August 2017 after the credits of the final episode of The Defenders. Also in the month, the series' Twitter account revealed the episode titles as Morse code messages. In September 2017, the series' Instagram account released viral videos made to look like security footage, while episodic photos and a poster for the season with a redacted release date were also released. On September 20, the official trailer for the season was released. Andrew Liptak of The Verge said it "sets up The Punisher with its own distinct tone that's different from the other Marvel Netflix shows. It wades into government conspiracies and hacking, which is reminiscent of shows like CBS's Person of Interest or USA's Mr. Robot, but with more gunfire." Nerdist's Kendall Ashley called the trailer "intense, super bloody, and has [me] INCREDIBLY pumped for the show's premiere." She added that "if this trailer is any indication, The Punisher is definitely going to live up to fan expectations". Ashley felt the inclusion of "One" by Metallica in the trailer "helps paint Frank as a badass unlike any we've seen on the Marvel Netflix shows so far." Cooper Hood, writing for Screen Rant felt the trailer would "only increase the fever for" the series despite it not yet having a release date, with it more closely fitting the "mold" of the character than the more cryptic videos previously released. He also found it "well-cut" to the beat of the song, which he praised as "amplifying the intensity".

By the end of September, Netflix had updated their viral website for the New York Bulletin to include a profile page for Karen Page. After revealing her login credentials in a post on Daredevil's Facebook page, readers who visited Page's profile found images referencing Page's research into Castle from the second season of Daredevil. Bernthal and other members of the cast were scheduled to appear at New York Comic Con 2017 to promote the season, but the panel was cancelled after the 2017 Las Vegas Strip shooting. Two weeks later, a second trailer was released revealing the season's release date of November 17, 2017. Tom Philip at GQ was not very enthused with the trailer, saying it was "hard to get super jazzed about another gritty, ultra-violent, gun-loving, non-superhero show right now." He was critical of the "utilitarian-sounding writing" in the trailer, but felt the chemistry between Bernthal and Woll would be a reason to watch the series. Philip also felt the addition of Moss-Bachrach was "curious", and said "at least [the series is] a swing for the fences from a TV studio that tends to play it astoundingly safe." Scott Mendelson of Forbes noted that the gun violence sequences featured were mainly "flashbacks with military men doing military things in full fatigues or scenes of bad guys shooting at not-so-bad guys with heavy gunfire", which was a strong contrast to the first trailer. Mendelson felt this shift in the marketing strategy could have been in response to the Las Vegas shooting. TechCrunch's Darrell Etherington agreed with Mendelson, noting how the trailer "plays up Castle's motivations and the more human side of the story", while still looking "gritty and dark, [and] Bernthal's portrayal looking as strong as ever." Etherington also criticized the soundtrack of the trailer. The Punisher had its red carpet premiere on November 6, 2017, in New York City at the 34th Street AMC Loews theatre.

== Release ==
The first season of The Punisher was released on November 17, 2017, worldwide on the streaming service Netflix. In July 2016, Netflix COO Ted Sarandos had stated that The Punisher would not debut until 2018 at the earliest, following The Defenders' August 18, 2017, release, but in October 2016 Marvel confirmed the 2017 release instead.

In early September 2017, Dominic Patten and Denise Petski of Deadline Hollywood commented on the lack of specific release date for the season at the time, calling it "an unusual" and "rare move for Marvel and Netflix, who usually give a lot of lead-up to the launch" of their high-profile series. The pair felt with the increased marketing of the season, it would release "sooner rather than later". Allison Keene of Collider expressed irritation at this because she and other television journalists were unable to plan content without knowing the release date, while fans anticipating the series would watch it "whenever it appears" regardless of when the date is announced. Polygon's Susana Polo felt Marvel and Netflix would announce the date at their scheduled New York Comic Con 2017 panel in October, as the convention had been used in previous years to reveal "breaking fall Marvel/Netflix news". It was soon reported that this was indeed the case, with Netflix planning a surprise "drop" release of the season after the New York Comic Con panel, mimicking a strategy from the music industry where an artist's album is released "with little or no fanfare". However, Marvel and Netflix decided to delay the release of the season to later in 2017 following the Las Vegas shooting and subsequent cancelling of the panel. Two weeks later, the November 17 release was announced.

Regarding the decisions made concerning the New York Comic Con panel and the season's release, Loeb said that they were made "specifically because it was a week after a horrible, horrible incident. It hasn't changed the television series, the show is not predominantly about gun violence, and in fact it shows you the problems that occur in that world." Bernthal and Lightfoot felt delaying the release of the season "was the right decision" out of respect for the victims, with Lightfoot saying there was no reason to go ahead with the panel if it was going to upset "even one person involved" with the shooting. Moore had initially felt the season would not be released at all once the panel was cancelled. Between the Las Vegas shooting and subsequent delaying of the season, and the eventual November 17 release, the United States experienced another mass shooting with the Sutherland Springs church shooting. Bernthal hoped that these two shootings and the release of the season would together help further the discussion on gun violence, with "all sides of this debate" represented in The Punisher.

The season, along with the second Punisher season and the other Marvel Netflix series, was removed from Netflix on March 1, 2022, due to Netflix's license for the series ending and Disney regaining the rights. The season became available on Disney+ in the United States, Canada, United Kingdom, Ireland, Australia, and New Zealand on March 16, ahead of its debut in Disney+'s other markets by the end of 2022.

== Reception ==
=== Critical response ===
The review aggregator website Rotten Tomatoes reported a 68% approval rating with an average rating of 6.70/10 based on 81 reviews. The site's critical consensus reads, "A rocky start can't keep The Punisher from pushing the boundaries of Marvel's TV universe with a fresh take on the comics-derived action thriller." Metacritic, which uses a weighted average, assigned a score of 55 out of 100, based on 20 critics, indicating "mixed or average" reviews. Summarizing the critical response to the entirety of the first season, GameSpot said reviews were "mixed." It received mixed to negative reviews from the LA Times and Salon.

The Washington Post said that Netflix had finally gotten the franchise "right" in a live-action in a way the prior three movies had failed to please fans. It gave the credit to the "soul" of the show and Bernthal as "one of Marvel's great casting gets" and made the show "a definitive adaptation that doubles as Netflix's best Marvel show to date." The Hollywood Reporter thought the first 13-episode season felt "at least twice the length it should be." The New York Times said "the action picks up as the season progresses, but The Punisher never quite gets in touch with the visceral roots of its material."

Esquire called the first season "a compelling and complex horror story about the military." The New York Times said that although the action picks up later in the first season, the slow pace made it less pulpy and more of a procedural thriller with a moody and psychological approach, particularly for its focus on PTSD. Variety also wrote positively of both the show and Bernthal's "seamless" performance, saying that "It's difficult to imagine better casting than Bernthal, who communicates so fluently with impassive silences, and is convincing both when he is being terribly violent and especially gentle." However, the review said the show took some time to show that it "transcends what it appears to be" at first, through Steve Lightfoot's "sharp, conscious storytelling." It also praised what it called anti-violence themes throughout the series. Vanity Fair wrote a less positive review, saying the show was as "psychologically confused as its antihero," as the writers had Castle target people for questionable reasons but portrayed him as justified. Vanity Fair wrote that "What the series neglects to examine, of course, is the fact that the Punisher is just as wicked as the villains he targets." Vulture described the show's attempts to "humanize and deepen" Castle beyond the violent "monster" he was in the original comics as "unpersuasive," and described a conflict between the showing wanting to be both The Best Years of Our Lives and Death Wish IV: The Crackdown at the same time.

Lightfoot defended the amount of violence in the series, reiterating that he did not feel that it was any more violent than Daredevil, that he believed it would be worse to not show the violent repercussions of Castle's actions because that would be "flippant" and not convey the real-life cost of the violence, and that Castle never "just blithely walk[s] away" from the violence as it always takes a physical or emotional toll on him. This extended to the repeated depictions of the death of Castle's wife, which Lightfoot did not think was in bad taste because it was about visualizing Castle's feelings, something he would not talk about; the deaths evolve through the season until they show Castle as the one killing her to signify that he blames himself for her death, which Lightfoot felt was important relationship building between Castle and the audience rather than just gratuitous violence.

=== Accolades ===
Collider ranked the season as the fourth best among superhero series of 2017.

Accolades received by The Punisher: Season 1
Year	Award	Category	Recipient(s)	Result	Ref.
2018	IGN's Best of 2017 Awards	Best Action Series	The Punisher	Nominated	
2018	Golden Reel Awards	Outstanding Achievement in Sound Editing – Episodic Short Form – Effects / Foley	"Memento Mori"	Nominated	
2018	Golden Trailer Awards	Best Action (TV Spot / Trailer / Teaser for a series)	"The Punisher – Reflections"	Nominated	
2018	Golden Trailer Awards	Best Graphics (in a TV Spot / Trailer / Teaser for a series)	"The Punisher – Reflections"	Nominated	
2018	Golden Trailer Awards	Best Sound Editing (in a TV Spot / Trailer / Teaser for a series)	"Family Man"	Nominated	
2018	Saturn Awards	Best Actor on Television	Jon Bernthal	Nominated	
2018	Saturn Awards	Best New Media Superhero Series	The Punisher	Won	
2018	Primetime Creative Arts Emmy Awards	Outstanding Stunt Coordination for a Drama Series, Limited Series, or Movie	The Punisher	Nominated	
