= The Punisher season 2 =

The Punisher
- Season 2
- Promotional poster
- Showrunner: Steve Lightfoot
- Starring: Jon Bernthal; Ben Barnes; Amber Rose Revah; Josh Stewart; Giorgia Whigham; Floriana Lima; Jason R. Moore
- No. of episodes: 13

Release
- Original network: Netflix
- Original release: January 18, 2019

Season chronology
- ← Previous; Season 1

The second and final season of the American television series The Punisher, which is based on the Marvel Comics character Punisher, follows Frank Castle as he saves a teenage drifter and decides if he should embrace the mantle of Punisher. It is set in the Marvel Cinematic Universe (MCU), sharing continuity with the franchise's films and other television series. The season was produced by Marvel Television in association with ABC Studios and Bohemian Risk Productions, with Steve Lightfoot serving as showrunner.

Jon Bernthal stars as Castle, reprising his role from the series Daredevil (2015–2018), alongside Ben Barnes, Amber Rose Revah, and Jason R. Moore who all returned from the first season. They are joined by Josh Stewart, Floriana Lima, and Giorgia Whigham. Former series regular Deborah Ann Woll also returned as a guest star. A second season of The Punisher was ordered in December 2017, a month after the first season was released. The new cast members were added in February 2018, and filming took place in New York City from March to August.

The season premiered on January 18, 2019, with all 13 episodes being released on Netflix. It received mixed reviews from critics and some accolades. Netflix canceled the series on February 18, 2019. Bernthal went on to reprise his role for Marvel Studios in the Daredevil revival series Daredevil: Born Again (2025–present), which led to the development of The Punisher: One Last Kill (2026), a Marvel Television Special Presentation.

== Episodes ==
No. overall	No. in season	Title	Directed by	Written by	Original release date
14	1	"Roadhouse Blues"	Jim O'Hanlon	Steve Lightfoot	January 18, 2019
At a bar in Michigan, Frank Castle helps deal with a belligerent drunk who hits on and insults bartender Beth Quinn. A teenage girl calls Russian gangster Sergei Konchevsky to sell photographs he commissioned after her fellow sellers were killed, not knowing that the religious man who killed them is torturing Konchevsky and kills him when the call ends. Beth invites Castle home for a drink and they sleep together. The next day, he meets her young son Rex and the three have breakfast. Despite planning to move on, Castle returns to the bar that night to see Beth again. He notices a group of people looking for the girl and intervenes, killing most of them when they pull knives and guns. During the fight, Beth is shot and Castle loses his wedding ring. He races Beth to a hospital, taking the girl with him and killing more members of the group who follow them. The man who killed Konchevsky finds Castle's ring at the bar and sees security footage of him fighting. In New York City, DHS agent Dinah Madani repeatedly visits Billy Russo, who is in a hospital recovering from the serious injuries that Castle gave him.
15	2	"Fight or Flight"	Jim O'Hanlon	Steve Lightfoot	January 18, 2019
Castle and the girl check into a motel in Larkville, Ohio, where he introduces himself as "Pete" and she gives the name "Rachel". The religious man visits Beth in the Michigan hospital and threatens her family and friends, forcing her to reveal "Pete"'s name. Madani is reprimanded by Rafael Hernandez, her mentor and DHS director of operations, for continuing to visit Russo despite being asked to stop. Russo claims not to remember anything after his time in the Marines, including hurting Madani or being injured by Castle, and is working with therapist Krista Dumont to organize the "jigsaw puzzle" of his mind. He has nightmares of a white skull. Survivors from the group who attacked the bar track Castle and the girl to their new motel and attack them. Castle kills all but one, Marlena, before the local sheriff arrives and arrests the three of them. The girl continues to claim that she does not know who any of these people are or why they are after her. Castle calls Madani for help but she turns him down. Castle, the girl, and Marlena are all processed by the sheriff's office, alerting the religious man to their location.
16	3	"Trouble the Water"	Jeremy Webb	Ken Kristensen	January 18, 2019
The religious man, John Pilgrim, is a former white supremacist with two sons and a sick wife who regularly attends a rural church. The wealthy couple financing the church and his wife's healthcare, Anderson and Eliza Schultz, sent him on his current mission. Pilgrim attempts to extradite Castle, Marlena, and the girl from the Larkville Sheriff Station but is turned away by Sheriff Roy Hardin. Hardin finds that "Rachel" is one of many aliases used by the girl. Feeling that Dumont's treatment is not helping him, Russo attacks the police officers who guard his hospital room and then takes Dumont hostage, forcing her to release him. Madani tries to investigate his escape but is turned away by Detective Sergeant Brett Mahoney. She then tries to contact Castle as Pilgrim attacks the station with more mercenaries, freeing Marlena. When she asks to be the one to kill Castle personally, Pilgrim kills Marlena. The girl helps Castle get free and he kills the assailants, except for Pilgrim who gets away when Madani arrives in a helicopter. She takes Castle to help deal with Russo, and he insists on bringing the girl.
17	4	"Scar Tissue"	Iain B. MacDonald	Angela LaManna	January 18, 2019
Madani hides Castle and the girl at her apartment in New York, and tells Castle she believes Russo is only pretending to have amnesia. Castle visits his military friend Curtis Hoyle, who disagrees with Madani and thinks Russo will be targeting people from his early memories. Castle recalls Russo telling him about being abused by Arthur Walsh, one of his childhood caregivers while in the system, and relays this to Madani. Russo visits Walsh and kills him; Madani arrives to find the body, and accidentally shoots at Mahoney when he follows her into the house. The girl explains to Castle that she and other teenage grifters were paid to take photographs at a funeral in Chicago, and afterwards the others were killed by Pilgrim while she was out getting dinner. After hearing Madani use Castle's actual name, she leaves the apartment and looks into his history as the "Punisher". She later returns and tells him that her real name is Amy. Russo goes to Dumont's apartment for help. She considers calling the police, but changes her mind after thinking back on their sessions together and her promises to help Russo.
18	5	"One-Eyed Jacks"	Stacie Passon	Dario Scardapane	January 18, 2019
Amy tells Castle about Konchevsky, whose gang is based at a Russian gym in New York. Castle coerces former arms dealer Turk Barrett into setting up a meeting between Konchevsky and Castle, but when Barrett goes to the gym he learns that Konchevsky is dead and they force Barrett to set up an ambush for Castle at Barrett's apartment. Amy uses Madani's credit card to go on a shopping spree. Russo overhears Dumont in a session with military veteran Jake Nelson, who then attends Hoyle's support group for veterans. Madani wishes to question Hoyle about Russo and ends up joining the group, discussing some of her trauma. Russo later finds Nelson at a bar and they have drinks together. Castle expects the ambush and goes to the gym instead, beating the Russians who are there and learning that the photographs were being bought for Nikolai Poloznev, a Russian businessman who lives in New York. Castle and Amy move from Madani's apartment to a trailer home provided by Hoyle. The Schultzes send Pilgrim to finish his mission in New York, and he kills the remaining Russians at the gym.
19	6	"Nakazat"	Jamie M. Dagg	Christine Boylan	January 18, 2019
Castle and Amy develop the photographs, which feature two men kissing. Pilgrim follows and threatens Madani, while Russo approaches and unintentionally scares Hoyle. Castle captures Poloznev, who says the photographs are of the Schultz's son, Senator David Schultz, whose homosexuality has been hidden by his parents. Castle spares Poloznev's life due to his young daughter, and tells him to leave the country with his family, but Pilgrim soon finds and kills Poloznev. Nelson introduces Russo to more veterans from Hoyle's group, including Jimbo who Hoyle has been helping get back on his feet. When Jimbo's car is towed, Russo leads the others in stopping and beating the tow-truck driver, and they decide to rob a bank together. At Dumont's apartment, Russo confronts her about someone with the initials "KM" who is mentioned in her file on him. He attacks her and she defends herself, but stops when he kisses her. Jimbo is arrested and calls Hoyle, telling him about Russo's involvement. Hoyle asks Madani and Castle to deal with Russo, and Castle tells them that he plans to kill Russo.
20	7	"One Bad Day"	Jet Wilkinson	Felicia D. Henderson	January 18, 2019
Madani officially took responsibility for Russo's injuries, to cover for the CIA and to allow Castle to go free, and now she struggles with that and with Castle's plan to kill Russo. She asks CIA Deputy Director Marion James for advice, and James tells her to let Castle and Russo kill each other. Russo and Dumont have sex, and Russo says their new relationship has helped with his nightmares, but he does not want to be trapped in her apartment. He practices the robbery of a payday loan business with his new friends and tells them to stay together for the night before the robbery, but Nelson sneaks away to get high on meth. Hoyle, Castle, and Madani track down Nelson and Castle tortures him until Madani objects. Hoyle convinces Nelson to tell them where Russo is, and Madani decides to call Mahoney. Castle and Hoyle go to the site of the robbery as Russo and the others are getting into their getaway cars with the stolen money. Castle attacks them wearing the Punisher's white skull symbol, triggering Russo's nightmares. The group drives away with Russo, and Castle gives chase under fire from a sniper.
21	8	"My Brother's Keeper"	Michael Offer	Bruce Marshall Romans	January 18, 2019
Russo realizes Castle is the one who injured him and turns back, starting a shootout with Castle. Hoyle takes out the sniper. Mahoney arrives with other police officers, forcing Russo and his group to flee. Castle and Hoyle cannot bring themselves to kill Russo when they have a shot. Mahoney corners Castle, but Hoyle and Castle get the better of him. Some of Russo's group turn on him due to his erratic behavior and he kills them. Dumont reluctantly lets Russo back into her apartment, where he struggles to understand why Castle, his best friend, would have injured him. He lashes out at Dumont, believing she knew all along, and scares her by breaking things and forcing her to look out the window which triggers her fear of heights. Despite this, she expresses love and support for him. Mahoney confronts Madani about her connection to Castle and asks who Hoyle is. Madani does not tell him, but tracks Hoyle to the trailer home in search of Castle. Russo regroups with the remaining members of the robbery gang and suggests they use the stolen money to buy weapons and more men. Castle visits his family's graves.
22	9	"Flustercluck"	Salli Richardson-Whitfield	Steve Lightfoot & Ken Kristensen	January 18, 2019
Russo's new gang go on a crime spree around the city, murdering and stealing money, weapons, and drugs while wearing masks. Anderson tells Pilgrim to use his former New York criminal ties to set a bounty on Castle and Amy. Russo breaks into Madani's apartment and she reveals that he killed Castle's family. Castle goes after Russo's gang and learns that their hideout is a warehouse in Queens called Valhalla. He is confronted by mercenaries who want to collect the bounty on his head, and kills them. Tired of waiting for Castle, Hoyle returns to his support group and asks veterans who have not joined Russo to help search for him. Amy goes to a friend, Shantel, who promises to get her out of the city. Castle realizes Amy is missing and calls her to warn her about the bounty. She sends him Shantel's address as a group of mercenaries arrive, tipped off by Shantel. Castle arrives and kills all but one while Amy hides in a utility closet. The last mercenary finds her, but Amy disarms and shoots him. Castle kills him and the two get away. Pilgrim is confronted by members of his former white supremacist gang.
23	10	"The Dark Hearts of Men"	Alex García López	Steve Lightfoot & Angela LaManna	January 18, 2019
Pilgrim sustains several injuries while he kills the members of his former gang. He then falls back into drugs, alcohol, and sex, doubting his purpose. Madani visits Dumont and they discuss Russo and Castle over a bottle of wine. Based on their discussion, Dumont tells Russo that he can break Castle by taking away his sense of goodness and superiority. Castle and Hoyle stake out Valhalla and plan an attack where Hoyle distracts the gang from a nearby rooftop while Castle sneaks in through a tunnel. They wait until a group of women who attend parties at Valhalla have left before starting their attack. Russo saw them staking out the warehouse and is waiting for Castle at the end of the tunnel with a group of his men. They brutally beat Castle, and then Russo leaves his men to finish him off. Outside, Hoyle tries not to kill any of the gang members, but one of them bleeds out after Hoyle shoots him in the leg. Castle gets the better of the men and chases after Russo, firing blindly. Three women were still inside and Castle finds their bodies. Believing he killed them, he stands in shock as police officers arrive.
24	11	"The Abyss"	Meera Menon	Laura Jean Leal	January 18, 2019
Mahoney arrests Castle and he is taken to a hospital where his friend Karen Page visits him. Russo and Dumont discuss their future together and Dumont tells Russo about "KM", her father, who struggled with PTSD after the Vietnam War and jumped out of a window with a young Dumont after her mother tried to divorce him; Dumont was injured in the fall and her father died. Eliza visits Pilgrim to tell him that his wife Rebecca has died, and instructs him to complete his mission despite his grief. Amy sneaks into the hospital and Madani arrives soon after, joining Page in wanting to help Castle despite his protests. Page and Madani examine the corpses of the three women in the hospital morgue and learn that they were executed by Russo before Castle was ever there. A rogue police officer attempts to kill Castle to collect the bounty and Amy tries to stop him, fighting until Madani returns and knocks him out. Learning that he was set up by Russo, Castle agrees to leave and sneaks out with Madani while Page sets off the fire alarms as cover. Mahoney catches them outside and takes Castle away in an ambulance.
25	12	"Collision Course"	Stephen Kay	Dario Scardapane	January 18, 2019
Pilgrim follows the ambulance and forces it off a freeway bridge. Madani catches up to him, but Pilgrim evades her and steals her car. Castle pulls Mahoney from the ambulance wreckage and Mahoney lets him walk away. After a call from Dumont, Madani grows suspicious of her. Pilgrim uses Madani's GPS to find the trailer home and attacks Hoyle. Amy returns from the hospital as they are fighting and Hoyle tells her to run; she secretly gets into the trunk of Pilgrim's car. Castle tracks down David, brings him to the trailer home, and interrogates him, learning that he is unaware of what his parents have been doing. Pilgrim drives back to his hotel and Amy follows him up to his hotel room. Russo tells his remaining men to leave town with fake passports and their share of the gang's spoils, and he also gets fake passports for himself and Dumont so they can start a new life together. Madani goes to Dumont's apartment and finds proof that Russo has been there. She and Dumont fight, and Madani pushes Dumont out a window. Russo finds her seriously injured outside the apartment and sees Madani inside.
26	13	"The Whirlwind"	Jeremy Webb	Steve Lightfoot	January 18, 2019
Russo attacks Madani and she shoots him before he knocks her out. Dumont survives and is taken to a hospital. Amy calls Castle, who has a shootout with Pilgrim in the hotel that ends with Pilgrim taking Amy hostage. Hoyle turns David over to Mahoney before Castle gets back to the trailer home. Pilgrim arrives with Amy and Castle tricks him into letting her go. After a fight, Pilgrim asks Castle to spare his sons and Castle reconsiders killing him. Russo seeks medical help but the surgeon takes his money and leaves him dying in a dumpster. He goes to where Hoyle holds his support group and calls Hoyle, but it is Castle who arrives and kills Russo. Mahoney reluctantly agrees with Hoyle and Madani on a story that does not involve Castle. Amy and Castle confront the Schultzes in their mansion, Castle kills Eliza when she attacks Amy, and they blackmail Anderson, who kills himself after they leave. Pilgrim takes his sons while Castle gives Amy money to start a new life in Florida. Three months later, Castle has embraced the Punisher mantle and turns down an offer to join Madani at her new CIA job.

== Cast and characters ==
=== Main ===
- Jon Bernthal as Frank Castle / Punisher
- Ben Barnes as Billy Russo
- Amber Rose Revah as Dinah Madani
- Josh Stewart as John Pilgrim
- Giorgia Whigham as Amy Bendix
- Floriana Lima as Krista Dumont
- Jason R. Moore as Curtis Hoyle

=== Recurring ===
- Royce Johnson as Brett Mahoney
- Corbin Bernsen as Anderson Schultz
- Annette O'Toole as Eliza Schultz
- Jordan Dean as Jake Nelson
- Samuel Gomez as José
- Jimi Stanton as Todd
- Brett Bartholomew as Phillip

=== Notable guests ===
- Tony Plana as Rafael Hernandez
- Rob Morgan as Turk Barrett
- Mary Elizabeth Mastrantonio as Marion James
- Deborah Ann Woll as Karen Page

== Production ==
=== Development ===
A second season of The Punisher was ordered by Netflix in December 2017, less than a month after the first season was released. Showrunner Steve Lightfoot had an idea of what a second season would be when he first knew what the "journey of season 1" was at the start of his work on the series, and did not let the fan reaction to the first season affect his plans since "some people love it, some people hate it, some people are in the middle. My personal opinion with that stuff is you just have to be true to the character and the story you choose to tell." The season consists of 13 episodes.

=== Writing and design ===
Lightfoot felt the theme for the season was Frank Castle "adopting the mantle" of the "Punisher". The season begins with Castle traveling across the United States as a way for him to get "a look at the country he fought for but has never really seen" according to Lightfoot. Costume designer Lorraine Calvert gave Castle a "more relaxed" look while he is traveling, having him wear blue jeans. Castle eventually puts back on another vest with the character's well-known skull symbol, with Lightfoot and Jon Bernthal working to make that "an integral, plot-driven moment" in the season. Bernthal felt they had "figured out a very intelligent, very tactical reason, a very psychologically tactical reason to wear it" with it making "a lot of sense". Lightfoot also spoke to the inclusion of Karen Page in the season, feeling the relationship between her and Castle would continue "to be very important".

The makeup department worked to realistically place the scars on Billy Russo's face, who is still recovering from his injuries and is suffering from brain damage. Though Russo resembles the character Jigsaw from the comics, he does not take on that name in the season. Ben Barnes also shaved his head for the role this season and adopts a thicker, rougher, New York accent, "more akin to his Bensonhurst roots". Barnes felt Russo had a vulnerability in the season similar to Vincent D'Onofrio's portrayal of Wilson Fisk in the first season of Daredevil. Dinah Madani has become "fixated" on Russo, visiting at the hospital daily with complete "tunnel-vision on him". Amber Rose Revah added that Madani is "self-medicating" after the events of the first season, resorting to drinking and promiscuous behavior. As Krista Dumont is "[v]ery uptight [and] doesn't want to let anyone into her personal world", Calvert worked to make her wardrobe equally concealing. Doing this "became a really important part of her character, to hide behind the facade of the clothes that cover her up."

=== Casting ===
Stars returning for the season were confirmed in February 2018, including Jon Bernthal as Frank Castle / Punisher, Ben Barnes as Billy Russo, Amber Rose Revah as Dinah Madani, and Jason R. Moore as Curtis Hoyle. Announced as joining them for the season were Josh Stewart as John Pilgrim, Floriana Lima as Krista Dumont, and Giorgia Whigham as Amy Bendix, with Corbin Bernsen as Anderson Schultz and Annette O'Toole as Eliza Schultz announced in May. Deborah Ann Woll was confirmed to be reprising her role as Karen Page in December 2018.

=== Filming ===
Filming for the season had begun by March 10, 2018, in The Bellmores, New York. Filming took place in Albany, New York, in mid-July 2018, with production on the season concluding in August 2018.

== Release ==
A teaser for the season released in January 2019. The episodes were released on Netflix worldwide on January 18, 2019. The season, along with the first Punisher season and the other Marvel Netflix series, was removed from Netflix on March 1, 2022, due to Netflix's license for the series ending and Disney regaining the rights. The season became available on Disney+ in the United States, Canada, United Kingdom, Ireland, Australia, and New Zealand on March 16, ahead of its debut in Disney+'s other markets by the end of 2022.

== Reception ==
=== Audience viewership ===
According to Parrot Analytics, which looks at consumer engagement in consumer research, streaming, downloads, and on social media, The Punisher was the most wanted streaming original series across all platforms in the United States during the week of January 27 to February 2, 2019.

=== Critical response ===
The review aggregator website Rotten Tomatoes reported a 61% approval rating with an average rating of 6.70/10 based on 38 reviews. The site's critical consensus reads, "The Punisher's second season leaves fans torn between the undeniably action-packed fun and the underwhelming portrayal of the charismatic Frank Castle." Metacritic, which uses a weighted average, assigned a score of 58 out of 100, based on 6 critics, indicating "mixed or average" reviews.

=== Accolades ===
Accolades received by The Punisher: Season 2
Year	Award	Category	Recipient(s)	Result	Ref.
2019	BMI Film & TV Awards	BMI Streaming Media Awards	Tyler Bates	Nominated	
2019	Golden Trailer Awards	Best Action (TV Spot / Trailer / Teaser for a series)	"The Punisher – Reunited"	Nominated	
2019	Golden Trailer Awards	Best Billboard	The Punisher	Nominated	
2019	Saturn Awards	Best Streaming Superhero Television Series	The Punisher	Nominated	
2019	Saturn Awards	Best Actor in Streaming Presentation	Jon Bernthal	Nominated	
