= Ken Kristensen =

American writer

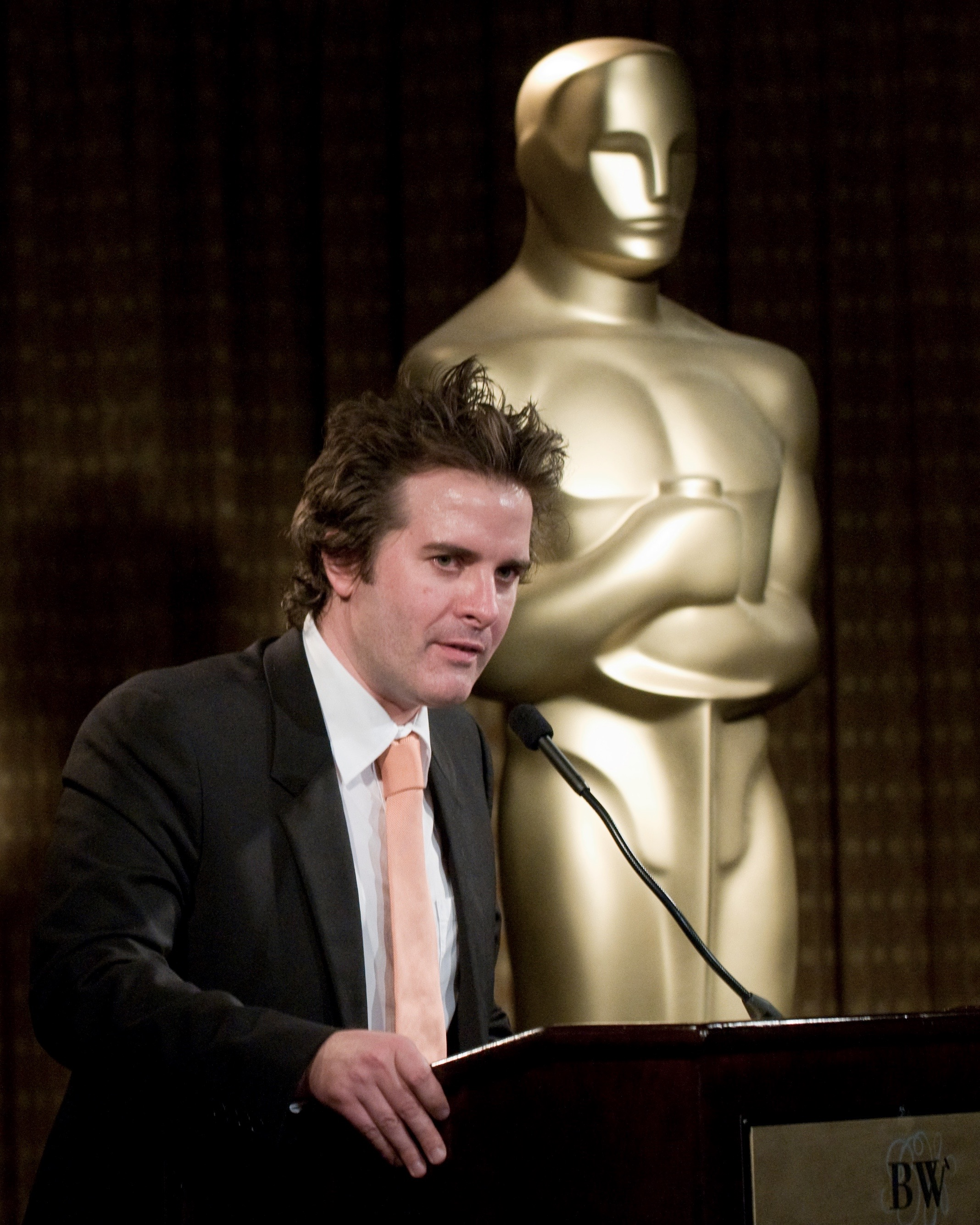
- Kristensen at the Academy of Motion Pictures Arts and Sciences
- Areas: Writer, Producer
- Notable works: Shantaram (Apple TV+/Paramount); The Continental: From the World of John Wick (Peacock/Lionsgate); Echo (Disney+/Marvel); Spidey and His Amazing Friends (Disney Jr./Marvel); The Punisher (Netflix); Happy! (SyFy); Todd, The Ugliest Kid on Earth (Image Comics)

Ken Kristensen is an American screenwriter, television writer, and comic book author. Kristensen has served as writer-producer on multiple series including Shantaram (Apple TV+/Paramount), The Continental: From the World of John Wick (Peacock/Lionsgate TV), Echo (Disney+/Marvel), Spidey and His Amazing Friends (Disney Junior/Marvel), The Punisher (Netflix/Marvel) and Happy! (SyFy), and authored comic book series published by Image Comics, IDW Publishing, and Dark Horse Comics. His television pilots have been developed at UCP, HBO, FX, A&E, Paramount Network, and Pivot TV. Kristensen is also a member of the Writers Guild of America West, Producers Guild of America, The Animation Guild, and the Academy of Television Arts & Sciences.

== Career ==
Ken Kristensen received an MFA from Columbia University Film School. While still in film school he was selected to both the Sundance and IFP labs, and worked as an associate producer under Gary Winick (Charlotte's Web) and Mark Waters (Mean Girls).

After graduating, Kristensen won the Academy Nicholl Fellowships in Screenwriting, and was a finalist for the Disney Feature Fellowship. He was hired by Pulitzer Prize winner Michael Chabon to write for The Amazing Adventures of The Escapist (a graphic novel spinoff of Chabon's The Adventures of Kavalier and Clay), and released by Dark Horse Comics.

Kristensen co-created the critical and commercial hit Todd, The Ugliest Kid on Earth — an Image Comics series with his longtime creative partner, Eisner-nominated comic book artist M.K. Perker. In 2016, FX purchased the series and commissioned Kristensen to write the pilot. Several other Image Comics series are currently in development.

In 2014, Kristensen was hired to write Indestructible, a monthly super-hero comic book series created by Jeff Kline and published by IDW/Darby Pop Publishing.

In 2015, Kristensen co-wrote and produced the short film Ronnie BoDean with director Steve Judd, starring Wes Studi.

Marvel's The Punisher—a Netflix TV series created by Steve Lightfoot, starring Jon Bernthal, based on the comic book, began production in 2016 with Kristensen on board as a writer. The show debuted in 2017 to critical and commercial acclaim. Kristensen wrote on season two, which debuted in January 2019.

Kristensen wrote Fairy Godbrothers, a hard cover graphic novel illustrated by M.K. Perker and published by Adaptive Books, August 2017.

In 2018, Scout Comics published Kristensen's comic book series Oblivion, a post-apocalyptic comic book series, with art by Francesco Gaston.

In 2017 Kristensen joined the writing staff of Happy! —a SyFy TV series, starring Christopher Meloni, based on the comic book published by Image Comics, and created by Grant Morrison and Brian Taylor, produced by Original Film and Universal Cable Productions. Season one premiered December 2017 to critical and commercial acclaim and was quickly granted a season two by the network. Kristensen was also on board as writer on season two, which debuted March 2019.

In 2020 Kristensen was writer and supervising producer on the Apple TV+ series Shantaram, which premiered in October 2022. He served as co-executive Producer on season two, but the show was cancelled before the season was produced.

From 2021 to 2022, Kristensen served as co-executive producer and writer for the Peacock/Lionsgate John Wick spinoff entitled The Continental: From the World of John Wick, released in 2023.

Kristensen wrote and produced the Marvel Studios/Disney+ series Echo released in 2024.

In 2024, Screen Rant announced that Kristensen was co-creating a TV and comic book series based on the adventures of journalists working for the tabloid Weekly World News.

== Bibliography ==
- Weekly World News (Mad Cave Studios, slated for release in 2026)
- Rant CPU (Scout Comics, 2025)
- Oblivion (Scout Comics, 2018–2019)
- Fairy Godbrothers (Adaptive Books, August 2017)
- The Amazing Adventures of The Escapist (Dark Horse Comics, Spring 2018)
- Todd, The Ugliest Kid on Earth #1–8 (Image Comics, January–December 2013)
- Indestructible #5–8 (IDW, April–September 2014)

== Filmography ==
=== Television ===
In addition to being a writer-producer on Shantaram (Apple TV+/Paramount), The Continental: From the World of John Wick (John Wick spinoff from Peacock/Lionsgate), Echo (Disney+/Marvel), Spidey and His Amazing Friends (Disney Jr/Marvel), The Punisher (Netflix/Marvel) and Happy! (SyFy), Kristensen served as producer on four seasons of Jail (Spike), two seasons of Inside American Jail (TruTV), and the TV special Road Warriors (Spike). He has also written and produced pilots for HBO, FX, A&E, Discovery Channel, Paramount Network, and Pivot TV.

- Echo (Season One, Episodes 1, 2, 3 and 4, 2024)
- Shantaram (Season One, Episodes 5 and 12, 2022)
- The Continental: From the World of John Wick (2023)
- Spidey and His Amazing Friends (2021)
- The Punisher (Season One, Episode 10, 2017; Season Two, Episodes 3 and 9, 2019)
- Happy! (Season One, Episode 6, 2018; Season Two, Episode 4, 2019)
- Futurestates (2012)
  - 3.06 - The Sixth World
- Jail (2011)
- Inside American Jail (2007)

=== Film ===
- Ronnie BoDean (2015)
- The Factory (2014)
- The Raft (2014)
- Road Warriors (2011)
- Lunar Landing (2008)
- Deadline (2008)
- Dead Man's Morphine (2006)
- Still Center (2005)
- Sorry, Haters (2005)
- The Disappearance of Andy Waxman (2004)

=== Writer ===
- Lunar Landing (2008)
- La Muerte Es Pequena (2005)

=== Director ===
- Lunar Landing (2008)
- No Apologies: 'Sorry, Haters' Roundtable (2006)
