= Todd, The Ugliest Kid on Earth =

Comic book series by Ken Kristensen and M.K. Perker

Publication information
- Publisher: Image Comics
- Schedule: Monthly
- Format: Ongoing series
- Genre: Comedy, Satirical
- Publication date: January – December 2013
- No. of issues: 8

Creative team
- Created by: Ken Kristensen; M.K. Perker
- Written by: Ken Kristensen
- Artist: M.K. Perker
- Inker: M.K. Perker
- Letterer: Patrick Brosseau
- Colorist(s): Cemal Soyleyen (#1-4); Sedat Gosterikli (#5-8)

Todd, The Ugliest Kid on Earth is a comic book series written by Ken Kristensen and illustrated by M.K. Perker. It focuses on the dysfunctional Belluomo Family, their exploits and lampooning American society.

== Plot ==
Todd is framed and jailed for the Maniac Killer murders. Peggy steals to help Todd make bail because his parents are oblivious. Meanwhile, Gus goes to see his idol, Belinda Fairchild, and bluff his way into her hotel room. Todd befriends the fellow inmate Eddie who helps Todd regain possession of a letter sent him by Peggy but then stolen. Eddie takes Todd to a hazing that Todd believes is a pillow fight.

Chief Hargrave discovers the true identity of the Maniac Killer while investigating the crime scene of the killer's latest victim. As the Killer is taken to jail, Gus strikes a deal with Belinda Fairchild to adopt her secret daughter (by putting a bag over her head to avoid recognition) in exchange for a monthly allowance. When the Maniac Killer get to jail, Todd helps him escape through the air ducts but they end up in the cafeteria. Once there, Peggy arrives to take a free Todd home. The next day, Todd goes to school and the teacher introduces the new classmate Sandy Belluomo.

When Gus decides to go to Comic-Con as his favorite character, Todd is taken along to carry home Gus' souvenirs. Gus buys a prop table from Belinda Fairchild's show that belong to Charlie Rose and is demonically possessed. Charlie hunts down the table; it magically abducts Sandy. Gus makes Todd dress like Sandy so as not to arouse suspicion about any disappearance of Sandy. Peggy goes to a plastic surgeon that uses voodoo to enlarge her breasts. When Charlie finds the table, Gus is ready to hand it over for cash. However, Gus' TV repairman turns out to be a demon hunter named The Marxman. When Peggy returns from the doctor Peggy Charlie kidnaps her but she escapes.

The Marxman and Todd decide to rescue Sandy by entering the table's portal and going to Hell. Once there, they encounter Satan and his obese son Craig. Satan and Craig's relationship is strained as Satan continually makes jokes about Craig's weight and Craig is reluctant to follow in his father's footsteps. Together, Craig and Todd help free Sandy and The Marxman rescues Santa Claus, who was shot down in Hell while trying to deliver presents to Craig. They escape Hell on Santa's sled but are attacked by Charlie Rose. Santa uses the sled's runner to disembowel Charlie Rose and saves Peggy.

== Characters ==
- Todd Belluomo: The protagonist and "ugliest kid on earth”, or at least his parents think so. Todd is incorrigibly upbeat and sees the good in everything. As such, he is always trying to make friends, and it's these efforts that tend to kick off the plots of each arc. It has never been established if the character is indeed “ugly” because he has never been shown without a paper bag over his head.
- Sandy Belluomo: Belinda Fairchild's secret daughter and Todd's adopted sister. Belinda originally had to disown her as a result of her commitment to scientology and paid Gus to pretend she's his daughter. Sandy has a bag over her head to hide her identity. She is sassy and spoiled, complementing Peggy's personality as the two get along well.
- Peggy Belluomo: Todd's mother. Described as “28 years old and looks 48, but thinks she looks 25. Tells everyone she’s 24. Looking for any opportunity to escape her current existence, honestly feels she deserves everything Jackie Kennedy had. Minus the Dallas thing.” Peggy's quick to blame others for any problems that might creep into her life.
- Gus Bellumo: Todd's father. Thinks "9/11 was a wake-up call, so he enlisted... a tattoo artist to give him some Army Ranger ink. “Otherwise the terrorists win!” He believes in God, country, and slip-and-fall lawsuits.”
- Belinda Fairchild: TV soap opera star and object of Gus' idolatry fandom. She makes a deal with Gus to adopt her secret daughter in exchange for giving him a monthly allowance.
- The Maniac Killer: An eccentric serial killer who targets children and enjoys Dominos pizza and watching Oprah. He tries to kill Todd in an alley but can't because he "only kills beautiful children"
- Chief Hargrave: The self inflated, egotistical police chief who is always looking for a fast track to fame. He wrongly imprisons Todd in the hope of becoming a celebrity.
- Eddie: (aka: Caesar) Based on real life convict and author Eddie Bunker, and Todd's fellow inmate in prison. He befriends Todd and helps confront another inmate that stole from him.
- The Marxman: A horribly disfigured demon hunter who wears Groucho Marx glasses. He masquerades as Gus' TV repair man in order to capture Charlie Rose and helps Todd rescue his sister Sandy.

== Inspiration ==
Perker and Kristensen have said the main character was inspired by their interaction with Kristensen's nephew who visited the two creators in New York City and interpreted some very ugly scenes on the city streets in an incredibly positive way.

== Reception ==
Todd, The Ugliest Kid on Earth has received wide praise for its humor and artwork. Bloody Disgusting has praised its "biting satire of celebrities, TV personalities, and even Comic-Con" and comparing M.K. Perker's illustrations to Norman Rockwell paintings. Unleash The Fanboy has called the series an "attack on sanity" and "is equivalent to some of the best satire and comedy that you'd see on almost any late night on cable". Geeks of Doom has called the series creators Ken Kristensen and M.K. Perker "endlessly talented individuals" but described the series as polarizing saying, "a book brilliant in its delivery yet ultimately not for everyone".

Danny Trejo, a fan of the series, also wrote the introduction for the second issue

The second volume (trade paperback) features a foreword from Larry King and an afterword by Mark Duplass, lampooning themselves and their relation to Satan.

Todd, The Ugliest Kid on Earth currently holds an 8.4 rating on Comic Book Roundup
