= The Punisher (TV series) =

2017–2019 Marvel Television series

- Genre: Action-adventure; Conspiracy thriller; Crime drama; Superhero
- Created by: Steve Lightfoot
- Based on: Punisher by: Gerry Conway; John Romita; Ross Andru
- Showrunner: Steve Lightfoot
- Starring: Jon Bernthal; Ebon Moss-Bachrach; Amber Rose Revah; Daniel Webber; Jason R. Moore; Michael Nathanson; Ben Barnes; Paul Schulze; Jaime Ray Newman; Deborah Ann Woll; Josh Stewart; Giorgia Whigham; Floriana Lima
- Composer: Tyler Bates
- Country of origin: United States
- Original language: English
- No. of seasons: 2
- No. of episodes: 26

Production
- Executive producers: Tom Shankland; Cindy Holland; Allie Goss; Laura Delahaye; Kris Henigman; Alan Fine; Stan Lee; Joe Quesada; Karim Zreik; Jim Chory; Jeph Loeb; Steve Lightfoot; Dario Scardapane
- Producers: Gail Barringer; Jared Ian Goldman
- Production location: New York City
- Cinematography: Bill Coleman; Manuel Billeter; Petr Hlinomaz; Francis Spieldenner
- Editors: William Yeh; Russell Denove; Tirsa Hackshaw; Tim Mirkovich; Trevor Penna; L. Schroeder
- Running time: 49–58 minutes
- Production companies: Marvel Television; ABC Studios; Bohemian Risk Productions

Original release
- Network: Netflix
- Release: November 17, 2017 – January 18, 2019

Related
- Daredevil; Marvel's Netflix television series; The Punisher: One Last Kill

Marvel's The Punisher is an American television series created by Steve Lightfoot for the streaming service Netflix, based on the Marvel Comics character Punisher. It is set in the Marvel Cinematic Universe (MCU), sharing continuity with the franchise's films and other television series, and is a spin-off from the first Marvel Netflix series, Daredevil (2015–2018). The Punisher was produced by Marvel Television in association with ABC Studios and Bohemian Risk Productions, with Lightfoot serving as showrunner.

Jon Bernthal reprised his role from Daredevil as Frank Castle / Punisher, a vigilante who uses lethal methods to fight crime. Amber Rose Revah, Jason R. Moore, Ben Barnes, and Deborah Ann Woll also star, joined by Ebon Moss-Bachrach, Daniel Webber, Paul Schulze, Michael Nathanson, and Jaime Ray Newman for the first season, and Josh Stewart, Giorgia Whigham, and Floriana Lima for the second season. A television series centered on the Punisher received a put pilot commitment at Fox in 2011, but that project fell through. In June 2015, Bernthal was cast as the character to appear in the second season of Daredevil (2016). Development on a spin-off began by January 2016, and Netflix ordered the series that April when the involvement of Bernthal and Lightfoot was confirmed. The series explores the title character's grief and violence, and was filmed in New York City.

The full first season was released on Netflix on November 17, 2017, followed by the second on January 18, 2019. They were met with mixed reviews, but received several accolades including a Primetime Creative Arts Emmy Award nomination. Netflix cancelled The Punisher on February 18, 2019. All of the Marvel Netflix series were removed from Netflix on March 1, 2022, after Disney regained the license for them. They began streaming on Disney+ from March 16. Beginning in 2025, Bernthal reprised his role as Castle in MCU projects produced by Marvel Studios, including the Marvel Television Special Presentation The Punisher: One Last Kill (2026), which was co-written by Bernthal and also featured Moore and Woll.

== Premise ==
After exacting revenge on those responsible for the deaths of his family, the first season finds former Marine Frank Castle, known throughout New York City as "the Punisher", uncovering a larger conspiracy beyond what was done to him and his family. The second season sees Castle, who has been living a quiet life on the road, drawn into the mystery surrounding the attempted murder of a teenage drifter, Amy Bendix, forcing him to decide if he should embrace his life as the Punisher.

== Cast and characters ==
=== Main ===
- Jon Bernthal as Frank Castle / Punisher:
  A vigilante who aims to fight the criminal underworld by any means necessary, no matter how lethal the results. Daredevil season one showrunner Steven S. DeKnight said this version of Punisher would be "completely the Marvel version", as previous portrayals did not appear under the Marvel Studios / Marvel Television banner. However, Bernthal did study all the previous portrayals, saying, "once you devour and eat up as much as you can, my way is to make it as personal as possible". On how Castle resonates with him, Bernthal said, "He ain't got a fucking cape. He ain't got any superpowers. He's a fucking tortured, angry father and husband who's living in this unbelievable world of darkness and loss and torment." Bernthal added that there would be "a military component" in the series since Castle is "a soldier... [The series] will be somewhat centered on that". He also stated that "the character that was portrayed on Daredevil season two was sort of the origin tale of how this guy became the Punisher, why he put on the vest." Bernthal noted he "always want[ed] to preserve the essence of" Castle, who Bernthal described as "brutal", "damaged" and "tortured", by exploring "the pain and what's behind the violence and the reason why he's committing the violence" that is "utterly satisfying and addictive for him".
- Ebon Moss-Bachrach as David Lieberman / Micro:
  A former NSA analyst who assists Castle after faking his death. Regarding Micro's relationship with Castle, Moss-Bachrach said, "We have found ourselves with common enemies and it's a marriage of convenience." Moss-Bachrach also felt the comics version of the character was "a one-trick pony", supplying equipment to Castle, but that the character gets "interesting when their relationship gets bad" and hoped to explore that in the series.
- Amber Rose Revah as Dinah Madani:
  An Iranian-American DHS Special Agent, stationed in Afghanistan, who returns to New York City for an investigation that leads her to cross paths with Castle. Revah noted that Madani "sees herself as American – that's what her being is, that's what she wants to protect, that's why she does what she does." As Madani is not based on a character from the comics, Revah's "research was based more on Homeland and what it's like for those people, and the logical processes the character would be going through. I think, for a lot of actors, if you're playing someone from comics, you probably feel you have some sort of responsibility to represent this character in a light that reflects how they were represented in the comic books. Because I didn't have that, it probably let me be more open in my representation." Revah spoke with actual Homeland officers as well as Iranian people "to make that [part of the character] authentic." A special shotgun was made for Revah to use, designed for her stature.
- Daniel Webber as Lewis Wilson: A young U.S. Army veteran of Afghanistan struggling with his new life as a taxi driver. He attends group therapy sessions with other servicemen under Curtis Hoyle. Webber felt his character was "a mirror to Frank's journey. These characters really look at each other and they both go separate routes."
- Jason R. Moore as Curtis Hoyle: A close friend of Castle, one of the few people who knows he is alive and former U.S. Navy SARC, who became the leader of a therapy group after losing the lower part of his left leg in combat.
- Michael Nathanson as Sam Stein: An HSI Special Agent and Madani's partner.
- Ben Barnes as Billy Russo / Jigsaw:
  Castle's former best friend from when they served in Force Recon together. Russo runs Anvil, a private military corporation. In season 2, he develops scars on his face, memory loss, and a broken mind like a "jigsaw puzzle" after Castle bashes his head into a mirror at the end of the first season.
- Paul Schulze as William Rawlins III / Agent Orange: The Director of Covert Operations at the CIA, who crosses paths with Castle due to their time in Afghanistan.
- Jaime Ray Newman as Sarah Lieberman: David's wife.
- Deborah Ann Woll as Karen Page:
  A reporter at the New York Bulletin and Matt Murdock's former assistant, who befriended Castle after working on his case. Woll reprises her role from previous Marvel Netflix series. Regarding Page's continuing relationship with Castle, Woll said, "Frank has a soft spot in Karen's heart, and certainly with the dark history that Karen has, there are very few people she can share her authentic self with. Frank is someone who she could potentially fully open up to." She added, "there's something about Frank where [Karen] doesn't have to be ashamed of her darkest, deepest side of herself. She gets to be more honest with him".
- Josh Stewart as John Pilgrim: A man with a calm exterior and a ruthless interior, who is forced to use the violent skills he developed in his former life once again. Stewart described him as an alt-right, Christian fundamentalist.
- Giorgia Whigham as Amy Bendix: A drifter with a mysterious past. She is a teenager who dislikes using profanity and is on the run from Pilgrim's men which leads to her eventually crossing paths with Castle.
- Floriana Lima as Krista Dumont: A psychotherapist for military veterans who works with Billy Russo. She is "very covered up" and "very uptight" in her personal life and "doesn't want to let anyone into her personal world," according to season two costume designer Lorraine Calvert.

=== Recurring ===
==== Introduced in season 1 ====
- Shohreh Aghdashloo as Farah Madani: Dinah's mother who runs a successful psychiatric practice.
- Jordan Mahome as Isaac Lange: A military veteran who attends Hoyle's support groups.
- Kelli Barrett as Maria Castle: Castle's deceased wife.
- Aidan Pierce Brennan as Frank Castle Jr.: Castle's deceased son.
- Nicolette Pierini as Lisa Castle: Castle's deceased daughter.
- Ripley Sobo as Leo Lieberman: David and Sarah's daughter.
- Kobi Frumer as Zach Lieberman: David and Sarah's son.
- Tony Plana as Rafael "Rafi" Hernandez: The director of operations for Homeland Security and Madani's mentor.
- Royce Johnson as Brett Mahoney: A Detective-Sergeant at the NYPD's 15th Precinct. Johnson reprises his role from previous Marvel Netflix series.

==== Introduced in season 2 ====
- Corbin Bernsen as Anderson Schultz: The co-leader of Testament Industries who hires John Pilgrim for his own nefarious purposes.
- Annette O'Toole as Eliza Schultz: The co-leader of Testament Industries who hires John Pilgrim for her own nefarious purposes.
- Jordan Dean as Jake Nelson: A fellow veteran who befriends and teams up with Billy Russo but suffers from drug addiction
- Samuel Gomez as José: A fellow veteran who is part of Billy Russo's crew
- Jimi Stanton as Tod: A fellow veteran who is part of Billy Russo's crew
- Brett Bartholomew as Phillip: A fellow veteran who is part of Billy Russo's crew

=== Guest ===
==== Introduced in season 1 ====
- C. Thomas Howell as Carson Wolf: A corrupt senior DHS agent, supervisor of "Operation Cerberus", and Madani's supervisor who crosses paths with Micro and then later Castle. Wolf is revealed to be corrupt, working for Rawlins, who had Wolf frame Micro for being a traitor, and seemingly killed Micro, though Micro survived the attempt on his life. Wolf is captured and interrogated by Frank, before being killed after attempting to kill Frank.
- Delaney Williams as O'Connor: A racist phony Vietnam veteran and NRA member who attends Hoyle's support groups. O'Connor is killed by Wilson for faking his military service.
- Lucca de Oliveira as Donny Chavez: a newly appointed construction worker in New York City who tried to make friends with Castle.
- Chris Critelli as Lance: a construction worker and low-level criminal who would often mock Castle.
- James J. Lorenzo as Tony Gnucci: a member of the Gnucci Crime Family, an Italian-American criminal organization based in New York City.
- Geoffrey Cantor as Mitchell Ellison: The editor-in-chief of the New York Bulletin and Page's boss. Cantor reprises his role from Daredevil.
- Shez Sardar as Ahmad Zubair: An Afghan policeman who worked with Madani.
- Jeb Kreager as Gunner Henderson: A Marine Corps veteran and member of the Cerberus Squad that worked alongside Castle and later went reclusive upon returning home. Gunner later reunited with Castle and helps him kill multiple Anvil agents sent to kill Gunner; Gunner is shot in the abdomen by one and bleeds to death.
- Clancy Brown as Ray Schoonover: Castle's commanding officer in Afghanistan. Brown reprises his role from Daredevil.
- Tim Guinee as Clay Wilson: Lewis Wilson's father who works to help his son get adjusted to his civilian life.
- Rob Morgan as Turk Barrett: A low-level criminal who operates in Hell's Kitchen and Harlem. Morgan reprises his role from previous Marvel Netflix shows.
- Mary Elizabeth Mastrantonio as Marion James: A Deputy Director of the CIA.
- Andrew Polk as Morty Bennett: A colonel who was a member of Cerberus Squad and worked under Rawlins. Morty is killed by Russo after being used as bait for Castle.
- Rick Holmes as Stan Ori: A U.S. Senator who is interviewed by Karen Page on his gun control views.
- Houshang Touzie as Hamid Madani: Dinah's father who is a doctor.

NY1 anchors Pat Kiernan, Roma Torre, and Stacy-Ann Gooden cameo as themselves.

==== Introduced in season 2 ====
- Alexa Davalos as Beth Quinn: A single mother in Ecorse, Michigan who runs Lola's Roadhouse and briefly takes an interest in Castle.
- Jagger Nelson as Rex Quinn: Beth's son who takes a liking to Castle.
- Avery Mason as Ringo: A bouncer and bodyguard who works at Lola's Roadhouse.
- Michael Pemberton as Lieutenant Ferrara: a corrupt police officer contacted by Pilgrim to cover his activity in Michigan.
- Teri Reeves as Marlena Olin: A tough mercenary who works for Pilgrim.
- Alex Notkin as Sergei Konchevsky: An ally to Amy who gets tortured by Pilgrim.
- Joe Holt as Sheriff Roy Hardin: A tough and disciplined sheriff in Larkville, Ohio who aids Castle.
- Brandon Gill as Deputy Ken Ogden: One of Hardin's deputies and Bruce's brother.
- Jamie Romero as Deputy Murphy: One of Hardin's deputies.
- Rudy Eisenzopf as Deputy Dobbs: One of Hardin's deputies.
- Donald Webber Jr. as Bruce Ogden: An inmate at Larkville County Sheriff Station and Ken's brother.
- Ilia Volok as Kazan: A Russian gang member.
- Keith Jardine as a Russian thug under Kazan's employ.
- Allie McCulloch as Rebecca Pilgrim: Pilgrim's loving and sick wife.
- Zell Steele Morrow as Michael Pilgrim: Pilgrim's son.
- Henry Boshart as Lemuel Pilgrim: Pilgrim's son.
- Thomas G. Waites as Arthur Walsh: A pedophilic foster parent who sexually abused Russo as a child.
- Charles Brice as Bobby: A fellow veteran who is part of Billy Russo's crew
- Brett Diggs as Anton: A fellow veteran who is part of Billy Russo's crew
- Dikran Tulaine as Nikolai Poloznev: A Russian businessman and gangster.
- Todd Alan Crain as David Schultz: A senator and the Schultzes' gay son.
- Derek Goh as Danny: a young member of Pilgrim's former gang who he hired to track down both Castle and Bendix.
- Jordyn DiNatale as Shantel: Bendix's friend who lives in New York City and former member of Fiona's Crew hired by Konchevsky.
- Kevin Chapman as Kusack: An old acquaintance of Pilgrim who is a white supremacist.
- Joseph D. Reitman as "Creepy" Ed Zatner: A mortician and ally of Karen Page with a strange obsession with women's shoes.

Shooter Jennings, Ted Russell Kamp, James Douglass, John F. Schreffler Jr. and Aubrey Richmond all appear as themselves.

== Episodes ==
Season	Episodes	Originally released
1	13	November 17, 2017
2	13	January 18, 2019

=== Season 1 (2017) ===
No. overall	No. in season	Title	Directed by	Written by	Original release date
1	1	"3AM"	Tom Shankland	Steve Lightfoot	November 17, 2017
2	2	"Two Dead Men"	Tom Shankland	Steve Lightfoot	November 17, 2017
3	3	"Kandahar"	Andy Goddard	Steve Lightfoot	November 17, 2017
4	4	"Resupply"	Kari Skogland	Dario Scardapane	November 17, 2017
5	5	"Gunner"	Dearbhla Walsh	Michael Jones-Morales	November 17, 2017
6	6	"The Judas Goat"	Jeremy Webb	Christine Boylan	November 17, 2017
7	7	"Crosshairs"	Andy Goddard	Bruce Marshall Romans	November 17, 2017
8	8	"Cold Steel"	Antonio Campos	Felicia D. Henderson	November 17, 2017
9	9	"Front Toward Enemy"	Marc Jobst	Angela LaManna	November 17, 2017
10	10	"Virtue of the Vicious"	Jim O'Hanlon	Ken Kristensen	November 17, 2017
11	11	"Danger Close"	Kevin Hooks	Felicia D. Henderson	November 17, 2017
12	12	"Home"	Jet Wilkinson	Dario Scardapane	November 17, 2017
13	13	"Memento Mori"	Stephen Surjik	Steve Lightfoot	November 17, 2017

=== Season 2 (2019) ===
No. overall	No. in season	Title	Directed by	Written by	Original release date
14	1	"Roadhouse Blues"	Jim O'Hanlon	Steve Lightfoot	January 18, 2019
15	2	"Fight or Flight"	Jim O'Hanlon	Steve Lightfoot	January 18, 2019
16	3	"Trouble the Water"	Jeremy Webb	Ken Kristensen	January 18, 2019
17	4	"Scar Tissue"	Iain B. MacDonald	Angela LaManna	January 18, 2019
18	5	"One-Eyed Jacks"	Stacie Passon	Dario Scardapane	January 18, 2019
19	6	"Nakazat"	Jamie M. Dagg	Christine Boylan	January 18, 2019
20	7	"One Bad Day"	Jet Wilkinson	Felicia D. Henderson	January 18, 2019
21	8	"My Brother's Keeper"	Michael Offer	Bruce Marshall Romans	January 18, 2019
22	9	"Flustercluck"	Salli Richardson-Whitfield	Steve Lightfoot & Ken Kristensen	January 18, 2019
23	10	"The Dark Hearts of Men"	Alex García López	Steve Lightfoot & Angela LaManna	January 18, 2019
24	11	"The Abyss"	Meera Menon	Laura Jean Leal	January 18, 2019
25	12	"Collision Course"	Stephen Kay	Dario Scardapane	January 18, 2019
26	13	"The Whirlwind"	Jeremy Webb	Steve Lightfoot	January 18, 2019

== Production ==
=== Development ===
In October 2011, ABC Studios sold a script based on the Punisher to Fox, who gave the project a put pilot commitment. The series would be an hour-long procedural following NYPD detective Frank Castle, "whose alter ego is that of a vigilante seeking justice for those failed by the court system." Ed Bernero was attached as executive producer, but by May 2012, the project had not moved forward. A year later, the character's film rights reverted to Marvel from Lionsgate. In June 2015, Jon Bernthal was announced as cast as Frank Castle in the second season of Daredevil on Netflix. The series was the first of several live action series provided to Netflix by Marvel Television and ABC Studios, with subsequent series featuring Jessica Jones, Luke Cage, and Iron Fist all leading up to a miniseries based on the Defenders.

By January 2016, ahead of the Daredevil season two release, Netflix was in "very early development" on a spin-off series titled The Punisher, and was looking for a showrunner. The series would be centered on Bernthal as Castle, and was described as a stand-alone series, outside of the series leading up to The Defenders. Head of Marvel Television and executive producer Jeph Loeb implied that Marvel Television had not instigated the development of the spin-off and were focusing on making "the best 13 episodes of Daredevil season two" at the time, but did say, "I'm never going to discourage a network from looking at one of our characters and encouraging us to do more ... If we are lucky enough that through the writing, through the direction, through the actor that people want to see more of that person, terrific." Loeb stated a month later that the reports about the potential spin-off were "something that people are speculating on, as opposed to something that's actually happening."

In April 2016, Netflix officially ordered a full 13-episode season of The Punisher, confirmed Bernthal's involvement, and named Steve Lightfoot as executive producer and showrunner. Loeb, Cindy Holland, and Jim Chory also serve as executive producers. A second 13-episode season was ordered in December 2017.

=== Writing ===
Lightfoot noted that "anti-heroes with dark pasts, that are morally grey, are always interesting to write." On deciding to work on The Punisher, Lightfoot stated, "I was drawn to a guy who is dealing with grief – how does he do that?... We talked a lot as we developed the show that once you take hold of the hand of violence it's impossible to let it go. That relationship to violence really interested me, not just the fact he has the ability to use it but also the cost of it." Lightfoot was inspired by the Bourne film series and the film American Sniper when approaching the series.

=== Casting ===
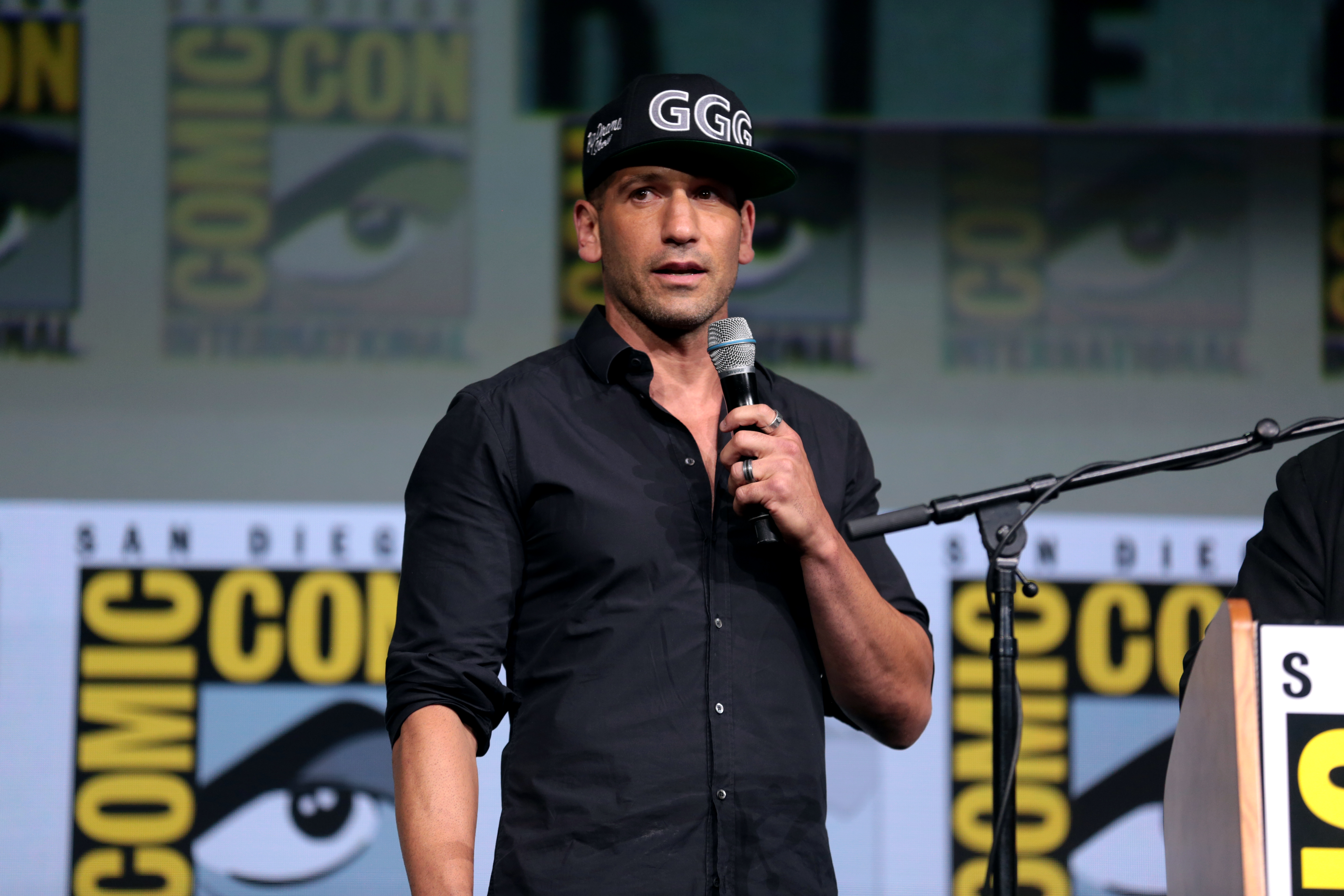
Bernthal promoting The Punisher at the 2017 San Diego Comic-Con

Bernthal had been cast as Castle in June 2015 to appear in the second season of Daredevil, and was confirmed to be reprising the role for the spin-off in April 2016. That September, Ben Barnes was cast in the series in an unspecified series regular role. The next month, set photos revealed that Deborah Ann Woll would reprise her Daredevil role as Karen Page, while Barnes was announced as playing Billy Russo, and Ebon Moss-Bachrach and Amber Rose Revah also joined the series, as David Lieberman / Micro and Dinah Madani, respectively. At New York Comic Con, Bernthal confirmed Woll as a co-star. At the end of October, Marvel announced the additional casting of Daniel Webber as Lewis Wilson, Jason R. Moore as Curtis Hoyle, Paul Schulze as William Rawlins, Jaime Ray Newman as Sarah Lieberman, and Michael Nathanson as Sam Stein.

For the second season, Bernthal, Barnes, Revah, Moore, and Woll all reprise their roles. They are joined by Josh Stewart as John Pilgrim, Floriana Lima as Krista Dumont, and Giorgia Whigham as Amy Bendix, who were cast in February 2018. In May 2018, Corbin Bernsen and Annette O'Toole were announced as joining the cast as Anderson and Eliza Schultz, respectively.

=== Filming ===
Filming for the series takes place in New York City, including Brooklyn, and Astoria, Queens.

=== Music ===
In April 2017, Tyler Bates was announced as the composer for The Punisher, after previously composing for Marvel's Guardians of the Galaxy and Guardians of the Galaxy Vol. 2.

== Release ==
The Punisher was released on the streaming service Netflix, worldwide. The episodes for each season were released simultaneously, as opposed to a serialized format, to encourage binge-watching, a format which has been successful for other Netflix series. Despite being branded as a "Netflix Original", The Punisher was licensed to Netflix from Disney.

The Punisher was removed from Netflix on March 1, 2022, along with the other Marvel Netflix series, due to Netflix's license for the series ending and Disney regaining the rights. Disney opted not to have Netflix pay a large licensing fee to retain the distribution rights for the series, and instead announced that all the series would be made available on Disney+ on March 16 in the United States, Canada, United Kingdom, Ireland, Australia, and New Zealand, and in Disney+'s other markets by the end of 2022. In the United States, revised parental controls were introduced to the service to allow the more mature content of the series to be added, similarly to the controls that already exist for other regions that have the Star content hub.

== Reception ==
=== Viewership ===
According to market research company Parrot Analytics, which looks at consumer engagement in consumer research, streaming, downloads, and on social media, The Punisher experienced a significant rise in demand for a Netflix series, surging from No. 8 to No. 1 with a nearly 56% increase in average daily Demand Expressions, driven by the full-week availability of its second season. The show maintained the No. 1 position one week later, despite a 15.8% drop in average daily Demand Expressions. Marketing analytics firm Jumpshot, which tracks five billion actions a day across 100 million devices to deliver insights into online consumer behavior, reported that The Punisher generated 24,569,232 views in Q1 2019, although it saw a 40% drop in viewership during its first weekend compared to season one. In January 2024, The Punisher saw a notable increase in viewership on Disney+ after the release of Echo on the platform.

=== Critical response ===
Critical response of The Punisher
Season	Rotten Tomatoes	Metacritic
1	68% (82 reviews)	55 (20 reviews)
2	61% (38 reviews)	58 (6 reviews)

On review aggregator website Rotten Tomatoes, the first season holds a 68% approval rating with an average rating of 6.8/10 based on 82 reviews. The site's critical consensus reads, "A rocky start can't keep The Punisher from pushing the boundaries of Marvel's TV universe with a fresh take on the comics-derived action thriller." Metacritic, which uses a weighted average, assigned a score of 55 out of 100, based on 20 critics, indicating "mixed or average reviews".

On Rotten Tomatoes, the second season holds a 61% approval rating with an average rating of 6.7/10 based on 38 reviews. The website's critical consensus reads, "The Punisher's second season leaves fans torn between the undeniably action-packed fun and the underwhelming portrayal of the charismatic Frank Castle." On Metacritic, it was assigned a score of 58 out of 100, based on 6 critics, indicating "mixed or average reviews".

=== Accolades ===
Year	Award	Category	Nominee(s) and recipient(s)	Result	Ref.
2018	Golden Reel Award	Outstanding Achievement in Sound Editing – Sound Effects and Foley for Episodic Short Form Broadcast Media	Lauren Stephens, Jordan Wilby, Jonathan Golodner, Antony Zeller, Zane D. Bruce, Lindsay Pepper	Nominated	
2018	Golden Trailer Awards	Best Sound Editing (TV Spot/Trailer/Teaser for a Series)	The Punisher	Nominated	
2018	Golden Trailer Awards	Best Graphics (TV Spot/Trailer/Teaser for a Series)	The Punisher	Nominated	
2018	Golden Trailer Awards	Best Action (TV Spot / Trailer /Teaser for a Series)	The Punisher	Nominated	
2018	Primetime Creative Arts Emmy Awards	Outstanding Stunt Coordination for a Drama Series, Limited Series or Movie	Thom Williams	Nominated	
2018	Saturn Awards	Best Actor on Television	Jon Bernthal	Nominated	
2018	Saturn Awards	Best New Media Superhero Series	The Punisher	Won	
2019	Golden Trailer Awards	Best Billboard	The Punisher	Nominated	
2019	Golden Trailer Awards	Best Action (TV Spot / Trailer /Teaser for a Series)	The Punisher	Nominated	
2019	Saturn Awards	Best Actor in Streaming Presentation	Jon Bernthal	Nominated	
2019	Saturn Awards	Best Streaming Superhero Television Series	The Punisher	Nominated	
2020	BMI Film & TV Awards	BMI Streaming Media Award	Tyler Bates	Won	

== Cancellation and future ==
The series was canceled on February 18, 2019. Prior to The Punisher's cancellation, Kevin A. Mayer, chairman of Walt Disney Direct-to-Consumer and International, noted that, while it had not yet been discussed, it was a possibility that Disney+ could revive the other cancelled Marvel Netflix series. Hulu's senior vice president of originals Craig Erwich also said that the streaming service was open to reviving the former Netflix series.

Ahead of Charlie Cox's appearance as Daredevil in the Disney+ series Echo, which released in January 2024, Marvel Studios' head of streaming Brad Winderbaum acknowledged that Marvel Studios had previously been "a little bit cagey" about what was part of their Sacred Timeline, noting how there had been the corporate divide between what Marvel Studios created and what Marvel Television created. He continued that as time has passed, Marvel Studios has begun to see "how well integrated the [Marvel Television] stories are" and personally felt "confident" in saying Daredevil specifically was part of the Sacred Timeline. With Echo's release, all of the Netflix series were retroactively added to the MCU Disney+ timeline, with The Punisher placed alongside the Phase Three content of the MCU, after Spider-Man: Homecoming (2017). An update to the Disney+ timeline split out the series by season, with The Punisher's second season placed between Thor: Ragnarok (2017) and Ant-Man and the Wasp (2018).

Bernthal reprises his role in the first season of the Disney+ series Daredevil: Born Again (2025). In February 2025, it was announced that Bernthal would star in The Punisher: One Last Kill, a Marvel Television Special Presentation, with Reinaldo Marcus Green directing and co-writing with Bernthal. The special was conceived during filming for the first season of Born Again, and was released on Disney+ on May 12, 2026. Moore and Woll also reprised their roles in the special, along with Kelli Barrett as Maria Castle. Bernthal's daughter, Addie, appears as Lisa Castle. Bernthal also stars in the MCU film Spider-Man: Brand New Day (2026).
