= A Lonely Place for Dying =

- Theatrical release poster
- Directed by: Justin Eugene Evans
- Screenplay by: Justin Eugene Evans
- Produced by: Justin Eugene Evans; Brent Daniels
- Starring: Ross Marquand; Michael Wincott; Michael Scovotti; James Cromwell; Brad Culver; Mike Peebler; Luis Robledo; Jason R. Moore
- Cinematography: Nick Bongianni
- Edited by: Brad Stoddard
- Music by: Brent Daniels
- Production company: Humble Magi
- Distributed by: Humble Magi; LPD, LLC
- Release dates: December 3, 2008 (Santa Fe Film Festival); September 7, 2012 (United States)
- Running time: 94 minutes
- Country: United States
- Language: English
- Budget: $200,000

A Lonely Place for Dying is a 2008 American independent thriller drama film directed by Justin Eugene Evans and produced by James Cromwell. Starring Ross Marquand, Michael Wincott, Michael Scovotti and James Cromwell, the film is set in 1972 during the Cold War. The film's score was composed by Brent Daniels.

== Plot ==
In 1972, an abandoned Mexican prison sits alone in the dusty Chihuahua desert. KGB mole Nikolai Dzerzhinsky waits for his contact from The Washington Post. Dzerzhinsky holds explosive evidence against the CIA; information he will trade for asylum in the United States. Special Agent Robert Harper must obtain this evidence and kill Dzerzhinsky or risk the end of his CIA career. As the two men hunt each other, they discover that the sins from their past destined them for this deadly confrontation.

== Cast ==
- Ross Marquand as KGB Officer Nikolai Dzerzhinsky
- Michael Scovotti as CIA Agent Robert Harper
- Michael Wincott as CIA Project Manager Anthony Greenglass
- James Cromwell as Washington Post Editor-In-Chief Howard Simons
- Brad Culver as Special Forces Captain Robert "Bob" Altman
- Mike Peebler as Special Forces First Lieutenant George Roy Hill
- Luis Robledo as Special Forces Staff Sergeant Solares
- Jason R. Moore as Special Forces Staff Sergeant William "Bill" Friedkin
- Stephen Jules Rubin as Special Forces Buck Sergeant Konigsberg

== Release ==
"A Lonely Place For Dying" held an unannounced sneak preview at the 2008 Santa Fe Film Festival. Despite being an out-of-competition rough-cut screening with no visual effects, music, sound mix or color grade, it was nominated for three awards and won the Heineken Red Star Award.

The first 22 minutes of the motion picture was released on VODO in July 2011. It was downloaded over one million times and became the best-seeded movie Torrent in the world for several weeks. "A Lonely Place For Dying" screened at its final three festivals and concluded its two-and-a-half-year-long festival run, while "part one" of the film dominated Bittorrent.

After nearly three years on the festival circuit, "A Lonely Place For Dying" received a limited theatrical release on approximately 19 screens throughout the United States. It debuted on September 7, 2012 at the Al Ringling Theatre in Baraboo, Wisconsin and concluded its run on November 4 of the same year in several theaters in Portland, Oregon. The film played in theaters across Wisconsin, Idaho, Montana, Ohio, Oregon and Washington.

In February, 2013, it was released on iTunes and Amazon. On May 31, 2013, the filmmakers held a charity screening of "A Lonely Place for Dying" at Justin Eugene Evans' high school in Clackamas, Oregon. All proceeds went to Clackamas High School's speech and drama departments.

== Accolades ==
"A Lonely Place for Dying" was an official selection of 46 film festivals where it was nominated for 53 awards and won 29 including 18 as best picture. The film began its festival run at the 2008 Santa Fe Film Festival and concluded its run as the Opening Night film for the 2011 Oaxaca Film. Fest Below is a partial list of the film's awards.

Award	Date of Ceremony	Category	Recipient(s) and nominee(s)	Result	Ref
Santa Fe Film Festival	December 7, 2008	Heineken Red Star Award	Justin Eugene Evans	Won	
Eugene International Film Festival	October 10, 2010	Best Action Narrative	Justin Eugene Evans	Won	
Somewhat North of Boston (S.N.O.B.) Film Festival	November 10, 2010	Best Action Film	Justin Eugene Evans	Won	
Park City Film Music Festival	June 10, 2010	Silver Medal for Excellence In Original Music	Brent Daniels	Won	
Wild Rose Independent Film Festival	November 6, 2010	Best Visual Effects	Marc Leonard & Daniel Broadway	Won	
Wild Rose Independent Film Festival	November 6, 2010	Best Cinematography (Certificate of Distinctive Achievement)	Justin Eugene Evans	Won	
Wild Rose Independent Film Festival	November 6, 2010	Best Makeup and Hair	Catherine Doughty	Nominated	
Wild Rose Independent Film Festival	November 6, 2010	Best Music	Brent Daniels	Nominated	
Wild Rose Independent Film Festival	November 6, 2010	Best Editing	Brad Stoddard	Nominated	
Wild Rose Independent Film Festival	November 6, 2010	Best Lighting Design	Justin Eugene Evans	Nominated	
Wild Rose Independent Film Festival	November 6, 2010	Best Ensemble	The Cast of ALPFD	Nominated	
Wild Rose Independent Film Festival	November 6, 2010	Best Actor	Ross Marquand	Nominated	
Wild Rose Independent Film Festival	November 6, 2010	Best Director - Feature Film	Justin Eugene Evans	Nominated	
Wild Rose Independent Film Festival	November 6, 2010	Best Feature Film	Justin Eugene Evans	Nominated	
Maverick Movie Awards	2010	Best Cinematography	Justin Eugene Evans	Nominated	
Maverick Movie Awards	2010	Best Actor	Ross Marquand	Nominated	
Maverick Movie Awards	2010	Best Supporting Actor	Michael Wincott	Nominated	
Maverick Movie Awards	2010	Best Production Design	Justin Eugene Evans, Jan Shane & Catherine Doughty	Nominated	
Maverick Movie Awards	2010	Best Special Effects	Daniel Broadway, Marc Leonard & Mystic Arts	Nominated	
Maverick Movie Awards	2010	Best Special Effects Make-Up	Catherine Doughty	Nominated	
Maverick Movie Awards	2010	Best Stunts	Rick Kingi & Kurly Tlapayawa	Won	
Maverick Movie Awards	2010	The Precious	James Cromwell	Nominated	
Beloit International Film Festival	February 19, 2011	Best Screenplay	Justin Eugene Evans	Won	
Beloit International Film Festival	February 19, 2011	Best Feature	Justin Eugene Evans	Won	
Indie Spirit Film Festival	April 17, 2011	Director's Choice Award	Justin Eugene Evans	Won	
Van Wert International Film Festival	July 10, 2011	Grand Prix	Justin Eugene Evans	Won	
Van Wert International Film Festival	July 10, 2011	Outstanding Direction	Justin Eugene Evans	Won	
Van Wert International Film Festival	July 10, 2011	Outstanding Actor	Ross Marquand	Won	
Van Wert International Film Festival	July 10, 2011	Outstanding Film Editing	Brad Stoddard	Won	
Burbank International Film Festival	September 21, 2011	Best Feature Film	Justin Eugene Evans	Won	
Burbank International Film Festival	September 21, 2011	Best Picture	Justin Eugene Evans	Won	
Oaxaca FilmFest	November 12, 2011	Opening Night Film	Justin Eugene Evans	Won	

== Reception ==
A Lonely Place for Dying was met with almost universal praise. Justine Browning of Huffington Post said "A Lonely Place for Dying (currently available on iTunes) is a powerful independent thriller from a promising new director Justin Eugene Evans." Andrew L. Urban of Urban Cinefile said "Executed with skill, the film uses its primary element - the abandoned Mexican prison - to terrific effect...excellent design and music, with terrific camerawork, complete what is arguably a better movie than many which get a theatrical release." Jesse Veverka of the Clyde Fitch Report refers to the film's director as an "independent narrative film prodigy." Charles Monroe Kane of WPT's "Director's Cut" said "A Lonely Place For Dying is an absolutely fantastic film!"
