= Geoffrey Cantor (actor) =

American actor

- Born: Geoffrey Paul Cantor; California
- Education: Amherst College
- Occupations: Actor, acting coach
- Years active: 1987–present

Geoffrey Paul Cantor is an American actor and acting coach. He is primarily known for his recurring role as Mitchell Ellison in the television series Daredevil (2015–2018), which he reprised in The Punisher (2017) and Daredevil: Born Again (2026).

== Early life and education ==
Cantor was born on an Air Force base in California. When his father, an Air Force captain and flight surgeon, finished his service, the family moved to Philadelphia. They moved a few more times (Newton Center, Massachusetts and Cherry Hill, New Jersey) as his father completed his internship and residency, and settled in Bergen County. His father was (and is still) involved in community theatre and his mother is a painter. Both of them enjoyed the arts and this resulted in Cantor's appreciation as well, especially the theater. "We were sort of progressive, liberal, Jewish people. I grew up in a time when were sort of at the cutting edge of that." Cantor graduated from Pascack Hills High School.

While attending Amherst College, Cantor came to find acting the most rewarding and intriguing art form, particularly British theatre which he found the most inspirational. Cantor graduated magna cum laude from Amherst College with a degree in theater, and furthered his acting education at Eugene O'Neill Theater Center and then at the Royal Central School of Speech & Drama in London, England.

Geoffrey was married to Cathleen Donnelly in August of 1992. They had two children together, Benjamin (June, 1994) and Talia (Feb, 1997). They separated in October of 2020, and were divorced in May of 2022.

== Career ==
=== Acting ===
He made his TV acting debut in Night Network before appearing in a variety of television shows such as The Street, The Kill Point, All My Children, Life on Mars, Law & Order: Criminal Intent, Deception and House of Cards He gained sudden recognition in 2015 for his role in Daredevil as Mitchell Ellison, the editor-in-chief of the New York Bulletin and boss to Ben Urich. A comic book fan, Cantor thinks his knowledge of Daredevil may have helped him get the role, even though his character does not appear in the comic book series. Despite this Cantor found his work on Daredevil the same as any other job, "Daredevil happened while I was about to do a play. For me there is no real difference between the core of the work. The real difference is the end experience." Cantor would reprise the role in seasons 2 and 3 of Daredevil, which sees Ellison take on a mentor role towards Karen Page, and as a guest star in The Punisher. He returned to the role in 2026, in a cameo at the end of the second season finale of Daredevil: Born Again. He also voiced the paparazzo Beverly Felton in the 2013 video game Grand Theft Auto V. He’s performed on Broadway in the productions Side Man in 1998 and Giant in 2026.

=== Directing ===
Geoffrey's short film EnSuite, an official selection at festivals like the Newport Beach Film Festival, the New York Shorts International Film Festival, the Chain NYC Film Festival, and the Garden State Film Festival, won multiple awards for Best Film, Best Director, Best Actress, and Best Actor. His documentary, Talking OutLOUD: Teens & Suicide Loss, A Conversation, created for Rethink The Conversation and Coping After Suicide, had its debut in November of 2023, and won Best of the Fest at the Chain Film Festival. Talking OutLOUD is available free on YouTube and Vimeo.

For the stage, his most recent project, October 7, (director and dramaturg) was created from the testimony of survivors of that horrific day. October 7 played to packed houses at the Actors Temple Theater, and is now touring colleges around the country. In 2021, he co-wrote and directed the semi-immersive New York.Circa.1909 (Soho Playhouse) for the Olami Manhattan Theater Company. Other projects include Sweet Texas Reckoning, Stripped (which also he co-wrote), James Mclure's Lone Star and Laundry & Bourbon, For Our Daughters, Prey (NYfringe 2010), My Secret Public Seder (Original, written for the Bergen County JCCY), Winterglass (Original), and Cowboys II, by Sam Shepard.

== Filmography ==
=== Television ===
Year	Title	Role	Notes
1987–1988	Night Network	Axeman / Himself	2 episodes
1997	Law & Order	Mirvis	Episode: "Terminal"
2000–2001	The Street	J.D.	4 episodes
2000	Law & Order	Dr. Luther Wilding	Episode: "Collision"
2001	Third Watch	Lewis	Episode: "Act Brave"
2002	Law & Order: Criminal Intent	Ronald Hardin	Episode: "Anti-Thesis"
2002	Ed	Opposing Lawyer	Episode: "Small Town Guys"
2003	Queens Supreme	Haddad's Lawyer	Episode: "Permanent Markers"
2003	Rubout	Steve / Raoul	TV movie
2003	Ed	Jim Adams	Episode: "Partners"
2004	Law & Order: Criminal Intent	Will Timmons	Episode: "Pas de Deux"
2005	Law & Order: Trial by Jury	Ronald Hardin	Episode: "Blue Wall"
2006	The Bedford Diaries		Episode: "The Passion of the Beaver"
2006	Law & Order	Adam Stein	Episode: "Fame"
2007	The Sopranos	Eli Kaplan	Episode: "Chasing It"
2007	The Kill Point	Abe Shelton	8 episodes
2007	Law & Order: Criminal Intent	Dukay's Attorney	Episode: "Endgame"
2007–2008	All My Children	Carl	3 episodes
2008	Guiding Light	Mr. Combs	1 episode
2008	Brotherhood	Milton	Episode: "The Chimes at Midnight"
2008	Law & Order	Jim Dooley	Episode: "Zero"
2008–2009	Life on Mars	Ed Redlich	2 episodes
2009	Mercy	Dr. Pell	Episode: "Can We Get That Drink Now?"
2009	The Broadroom	Gus	Episode: "Alice in Imposter Land"
2009	Bored to Death	Mr. Eaton	Episode: "The Case of the Beautiful Blackmailer"
2009	Law & Order: Special Victims Unit	Ed Mangini	Episode: "Crush"
2010	The Stay-At-Home Dad	Gay Dad	webseries
2011	Untitled Jersey City Project	Ed Smith	3 episodes
2011	Pan Am	Mr. Claymore	Episode: "The Genuine Article"
2011	Law & Order: Criminal Intent	Ethan Lowe	Episode: "Cadaver"
2011	Law & Order: Special Victims Unit	Victor	Episode: "Mask"
2012	Smash	Bobby Raskin	Episode: "Chemistry"
2012	The Big C	Fred Bobick	Episode: "Family Matters"
2012	Damages	Clark Reinsdorf	2 episodes
2012	Person of Interest	Sebastian Alta	Episode: "Critical"
2013	Deception	Tom Vanderfield	5 episodes
2013	Zero Hour	Professor Chalis	Episode: "Sync"
2013	Law & Order: Special Victims Unit	Gene Fierstein	Episode: "Rapist Anonymous"
2014	The Americans	Thane Rosenbloom	Episode: "Arpanet"
2014	The Following	Detective	Episode: "Silence"
2014	Good Medicine	Party Clown	Episode: "Tina"
2014	Believe	Dr. Taussig	2 episodes
2014	Forever	Alienist	Episode: "Skinny Dipper"
2014–2015	The Blacklist	Phil Ryerson	3 episodes
2014–2016	House of Cards	Ben Goldstein	2 episodes
2015	Karl Manhair, Postal Inspector	Karl Manhair	6 episodes
2015	Elementary	Maurice Antonov	Episode: "Evidence of Things Not Seen"
2015–2018	Daredevil	Mitchell Ellison	16 episodes
2016	Feed the Beast	Christian	5 episodes
2016	Sublets	Eddie Falcon	Episode: "No Exit"
2016	Madam Secretary	Tom Murphy	Episode: "South China Sea"
2016	The Daily Show	Dr. Jerry Baxter	Episode: "Common"
2017	The Wizard of Lies	SEC Agent Ostrow	TV movie
2017	The Punisher	Mitchell Ellison	2 episodes
2017	Civil	Bobby Fletcher	TV movie
2018	The Tick	Agent Adams	3 episodes
2018	Maniac	Frank	4 episodes
2019	Bumbld	Yosef	Episode: "Adulting"
2019	The Deuce	Health Commissioner	Episode: "Finish It"
2019-2020	The Resident	Zip Betournay	3 episodes
2021	Foundation	Ambassador Thanwall	3 episodes
2023	Harlan Coben's Shelter	Barry "Mr. V" Vollmer	2 episodes
2025	Zero Day	Hector Franklin	1 Episode
2025	Sub/liminal		
2026	Daredevil: Born Again	Mitchell Ellison	Episode: "The Southern Cross"

=== Films ===
Year	Title	Role	Notes
1998	Anima	Cam	
1999	Speed of Life	Carter	
2001	Double Whammy	Maitre'd	
2002	Crazy Little Thing	Todd	
2002	Garmento	Fred Macmoudi	
2005	One Last Thing...	Raul	
2005	The Notorious Bettie Page	Director at Audition	
2007	Suburban Girl	Library Curator	
2007	Heavy Petting	Stefan Roche	
2009	Public Enemies	Harry Suydam	
2010	When in Rome	Dr. Moscowitz	
2010	Christopher Dispossessed	Stephen	Short
2010	Fair Game	Ari Fleischer	
2012	Man on a Ledge	Gordon Evans	
2012	Men in Black 3	Technician	Uncredited
2012	Thanks for Sharing	Addict #4	
2013	Syrup	Executive #2	
2013	Bert and Arnie's Guide to Friendship	Gerry the Editor	
2014	Beach Pillows	Larry Fumuso	
2014	We'll Never Have Paris	Neighbor	
2014	Creamen	Mr.Popivanov (voice)	Short
2014	Bird People	Allan	
2014	The Longest Week	Intellectual #1 Subway	
2015	A Warrior's Tail	Semi-Baron Fafl (English voice)	
2015	Fishbowl	Gerry Saxon	
2015	411	Arthur	Short
2016	Hail, Caesar!	Sid Siegelstein	
2016	Bling	Additional Voices	
2017	Ironwood	Professor Gerry Williams	
2017	This isn't happening	Edgar	Short
2017	On the Way North	The Bearded Man	Short
2017	Anna & The Asteroid	Homeless Man	Short
2018	Hot Air	Stanley	
2019	Telephone	Dr. Rand	Short
2020	Brighton Beach	Miroslav Roach, ESQ	
2020	An American Pickle	David Greenbaum	
2020	Blackjack: The Jackie Ryan Story	Peter Vecsey	
2021	The Girl Who Got Away	Terry Caldwell	
2022	Call Jane	Dr. Falk	
2023	Creep Box	Caul	
2024	Hans		Short
2025	The Dinner Plan	Wally	Short

=== Video Games ===
Year	Title	Role	Notes
2003	Manhunt	Innocent	
2010	Alan Wake	Clay Steward, Alvyn Derleth, Mr. Jones	
2011	Saints Row: The Third	Radio Voices	
2013	Grand Theft Auto V	Beverly Felton	
