= Michael Nathanson (actor) =

American actor

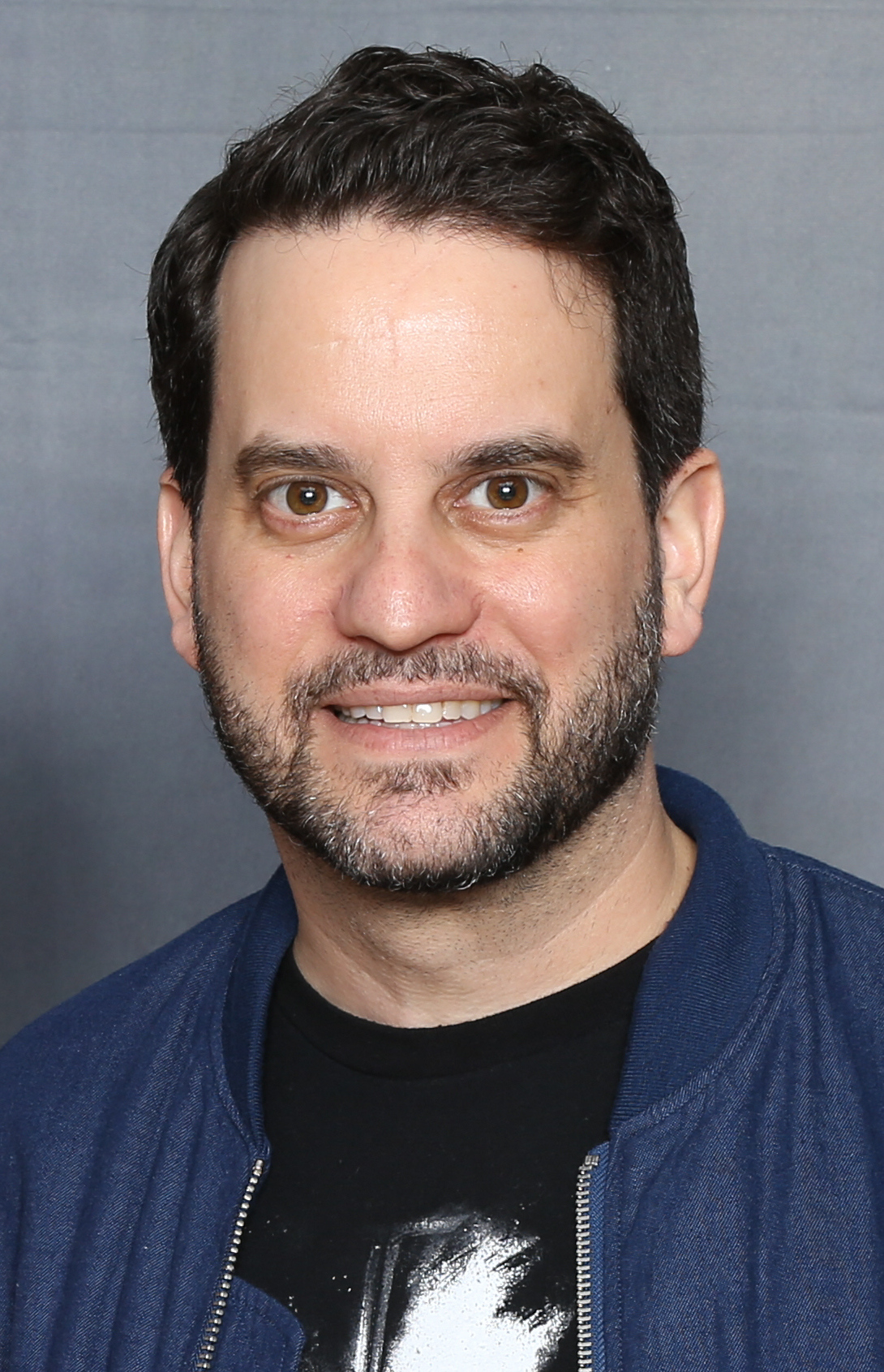
- Nathanson in 2018
- Occupation: Actor
- Years active: 2000–present
- Spouse: Hayley Ehrlich (m. 2008–present)
- Children: 2

Michael Nathanson is an American actor, known for roles such as Sam Stein in Marvel's The Punisher, and Dr. Levi Zinberg in The Knick.

== Career ==
Michael Nathanson grew up in New York. He studied at Northwestern University, but returned to New York because "so much of the work has come back to New York." He had briefly worked as a bartender at a friend's bar to earn some income on the side. He joined the cast of The Punisher which is set in the Marvel Cinematic Universe.

== Personal life ==
In 2008, he married Hayley Elizabeth Ehrlich. They have twin daughters together.

== Filmography ==
Television roles
Year	Title	Role	Notes
2009	Law & Order	Detective Leonard	Episode: "Crimebusters"
2009	30 Rock	Hank	Episode: "The Ones"
2010	Rescue Me	Victim #2	Episode: "Legacy"
2011	The B.S. of A. with Brian Sack	Various	
2012	The Good Wife	Randy Krebbs	Episode: "Live from Damascus"
2012	Elementary	Infomercial Narrator	Episode: "Pilot"
2013	Mother's Day	Ted	TV movie
2013	Orange Is the New Black	Kinno	Episode: "WAC Pack"
2014-2015	The Knick	Dr. Levi Zinberg	Recurring (season 1), main cast (season 2)
2016	Unforgettable	Steven Patchett	Episode: "Shelter from the Storm"
2016	Chicago Med	Mr. Tracker	Episode: "Us"
2016	BrainDead	Kenneth the Lobbyist	Episode: "Goring Oxes: How You Can Survive the War on Government Through Five Easy Steps"
2017	The Punisher	Sam Stein	Main cast (season 1)
2017	The Marvelous Mrs. Maisel	Lew Fogelman	Mrs. X at the Gaslight
2019	Succession	Waystar Executive	Episode: "DC"

Film roles
Year	Title	Role	Notes
2000	Table One	Clubgoer	
2007	Daymaker	Chris	
2009	Shot List	Jeff	
2011	Time Freak	Stillman	Short
2011	Young Adult	Champions Greeter	
2012	Generation Um...	Bachelor Party Guy	
2012	Charred	Spastic Chef	Short
2013	Side Effects	Assistant District Attorney	
2013	This is Ellen	Hal	Short
2013	The Happy Sad	David	
2013	The High Tones	Terrible Date	Short
2013	The Wolf of Wall Street	Barry Kleinman	
2014	Tribute	Rob	Short
2015	Fils	Hooper	Short
2016	Flatbush Luck	Sam	
2017	Broken Night	Detective	Short
2017	After Party	Dennis	
2018	Can't Have You	Alan	
