= Rob Morgan (actor) =

American actor

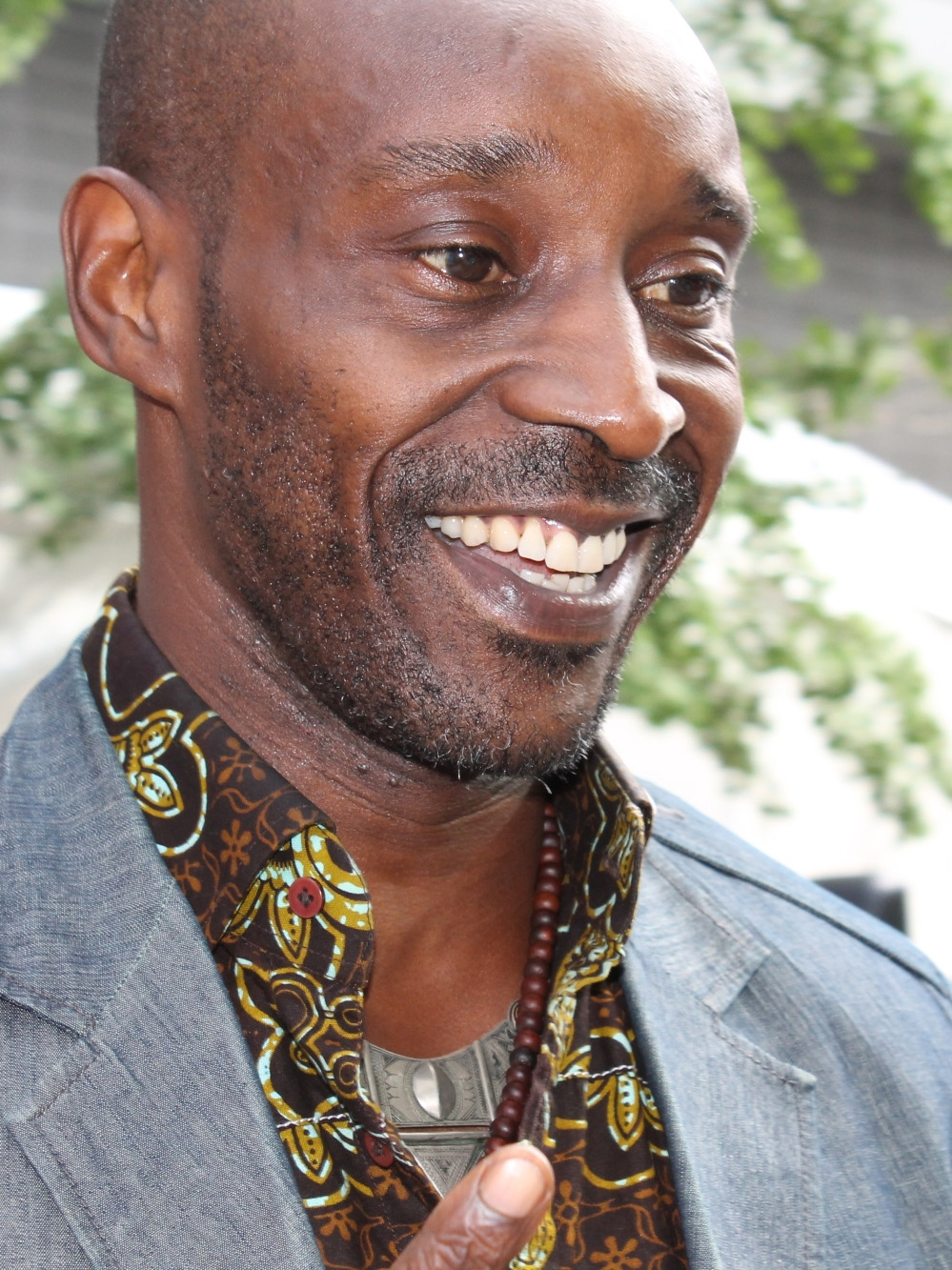
- Morgan in 2019
- Born: February 24, 1973 (age 53); New Bern, North Carolina, U.S.
- Occupation: Actor
- Years active: 2004–present

Rob Morgan (born February 24, 1973) is an American actor. He is known for his role as Turk Barrett in all six of Marvel's Netflix television series (2015–2019), Hap Jackson in Mudbound (2017), Officer Powell in Stranger Things (2016–2025), and Teddy Oglethorpe in Don't Look Up (2021).

In 2020, Morgan was ranked #20 on the New York Times list "The 25 Greatest Actors of the 21st Century".

== Filmography ==
=== Film ===
Year	Title	Role	Notes
2006	Sorry Ain't Enough	Cinque	
2009	Pro-Black Sheep	Alex	
2010	Conspiracy X	Gee Pa	
2011	Pariah	"Sock"	
2013	The Inevitable Defeat of Mister & Pete	Curtis, Cuffed Man	
2013	Full Circle	Lomatic	
2013	Waltz for Monica	Miles Davis	Uncredited
2014	Early Light	Calvin	
2014	Shelter	Franklin	
2014	Other Plans	Gerry	
2015	The Challenger	Frederick	
2015	Anesthesia	Parnell	
2015	All Hale	Patrice Barker	
2017	Mudbound	Hap Jackson	
2017	Fair Market Value	"Kwik-D"	
2017	Wetlands	Sergeant Walker	
2017	Brawl in Cell Block 99	Jeremy	
2017	Steps	Brian Coleman	
2018	Monsters and Men	Will Morris	
2018	The Week Of	Cousin Marvin	
2019	The Last Black Man in San Francisco	James Sr.	
2019	Bull	Abe	
2019	Just Mercy	Herbert Richardson	
2020	The Photograph	Isaac Jefferson	
2020	Greyhound	Cleveland	
2020	Cut Throat City	Courtney	
2021	The United States vs. Billie Holiday	Louis McKay	
2021	The Unforgivable	Vincent Cross	
2021	Don't Look Up	Dr. Teddy Oglethorpe	
2022	Smile	Robert Talley	
2025	The Rivals of Amziah King	Rippy	
2025	Signing Tony Raymond	Otis Henderson	
2026	Frank & Louis †	Louis	Completed
TBA	Greyhound 2 †	Cleveland	Filming

=== Television ===
Year	Title	Role	Notes
2009	30 Rock	Cab Driver	Episode: "Audition Day"
2011	Blue Bloods	Guy In The Crowd	Episode: "Black and Blue"
2012	Evil, I	Voice of the Killer	Episode: "The Sunday Morning Slasher"
2013	A Crime to Remember	Nathan Delaney	Episode: "The Career Girl Murders"
2013	For Colored Boys, Redemption	Benjamin Boyd Sr.	
2013	Zero Hour	Guest #1	Episode: "Weight"
2013	The Married Bachelor	Dana Wallace	Pilot
2014	In Dice We Trust	Detective Riley	
2014	Believe	Parker	4 episodes
2014	The Knick	Diggs Man	2 episodes
2014	Person of Interest	Howard	Episode: "Point of Origin"
2015	Unforgettable	Chief Tullen	Episode: "Gut Check"
2015–2016	Daredevil	Turk Barrett	7 episodes
2016–2022	Stranger Things	Officer Powell	16 episodes
2016–2018	Luke Cage	Turk Barrett	3 episodes
2017	Godless	John Randall	4 episodes
2017	The Defenders	Turk Barrett	Episode: "Mean Right Hook"
2017–2019	The Punisher	Turk Barrett	2 episodes
2018	Jessica Jones	Turk Barrett	Episode: "AKA Pray for My Patsy"
2018	Iron Fist	Turk Barrett	Episode: "War Without End"
2018–2019	This Is Us	Councilman Sol Brown	5 episodes
2018–2020	High Maintenance	Damien	2 episodes
2019	It's Bruno!	Harvey	Main cast
2019	Bull	Gerald Washington	Episode: "Her Own Two Feet"
2022–2023	Winning Time: The Rise of the Lakers Dynasty	Earvin Johnson Sr.	Main cast
2023	CSI: Vegas	Daniel Jordan	2 episodes
2023	Lawmen: Bass Reeves	Ramsey	5 episodes
2024	Teacup	McNab	Main cast
2026	Chicago Fire	Battalion Chief	Recurring

== Awards and nominations ==
Year	Award	Category	Nominated work	Result
2017	Gotham Awards	Best Ensemble Performance (shared with the cast)	Mudbound	Won
2017	Screen Actors Guild Awards	Outstanding Performance by an Ensemble in a Drama Series	Stranger Things	Won
2018	Screen Actors Guild Awards	Outstanding Performance by a Cast in a Motion Picture	Mudbound	Nominated
2018	Independent Spirit Awards	Robert Altman Award	Mudbound	Won
2019	Black Reel TV Awards	Outstanding Guest Actor, Drama Series	This Is Us	Won
2020	NAACP Image Awards	Outstanding Breakthrough Performance in a Motion Picture	Just Mercy	Nominated
2021	Black Reel Awards	Outstanding Actor	Bull	Nominated
2021	Independent Spirit Awards	Best Male Lead	Bull	Nominated
2022	Screen Actors Guild Awards	Outstanding Performance by a Cast in a Motion Picture	Don't Look Up	Nominated
2022	Black Reel TV Awards	Outstanding Guest Actor, Drama Series	Stranger Things	Nominated
