= Jason R. Moore =

Jamaican-American actor

- Born: Jason Robert Moore; Kingston, Jamaica
- Occupations: Actor, entrepreneur
- Years active: 2007–present
- Known for: The Punisher (2017–2019)

Jason R. Moore is a Jamaican-American actor based in Los Angeles, California. He’s best known for his role as Curtis Hoyle in the Marvel Cinematic Universe (2017–2026).

== Career ==
Jason Moore was born in Kingston, Jamaica, but grew up in Albany, New York. He moved to New York City after graduating college, and soon after acquired roles on television series such as Law & Order: Special Victims Unit, Kings and The Unusuals. Moore secured a small role in his first movie The Sorcerer's Apprentice, followed by Killjoy Goes to Hell, and other short films. After moving to Los Angeles, Moore was later cast as Curtis Hoyle for Marvel series The Punisher.

== Filmography ==
Television roles
Year	Title	Role	Notes
2007	Guiding Light	Tanner	Episode: "#1.15265"
2007	As the World Turns	Burt	Episode: "#1.13121"
2008	Law & Order: Special Victims Unit	Jensen Delivery Man	Episode: "Inconceivable"
2008	Amazing Sports Stories	Burl Toler	Episode: "The San Francisco Dons: The Color of Courage"
2008	One Life to Live	Officer Kimball	Episode: "Guilt-O-Whirl"
2009	Kings	Nathan	Episode: "Goliath: Part One"
2009	The Unusuals	Bomb Tech	2 episodes
2017–2019	The Punisher	Curtis Hoyle	Main role (21 episodes)
2017	The Grindhouse Radio	Himself	2 episodes
2018	The Quad	Dr. Jeff	2 episodes
2022	First Kill	Jack Burns	Main role (8 episodes)
2023–2024	True Reviews	Host	10 episodes
2026	The Punisher: One Last Kill	Curtis Hoyle	Disney+ special

Film roles
Year	Title	Role	Notes
2009	A Lonely Place for Dying	Staff Sergeant Friedkin	
2009	Company Retreat	Balthazar	
2009	Gym Rats	Indique	Short
2010	The Sorcerer's Apprentice	Subway Mugger	
2010	9 Digits	Husband	Short
2011	Mr. Stache	Bear #3	Short
2012	Killjoy Goes to Hell	Det. Ericson	
2017	A Loss of Shadows	Maurice Avery	
2024	Sentinel	Damon Singleton	
