= Amber Rose Revah =

English actress (born 1986)

- Born: 24 June 1986 (age 40); London, England
- Education: Brunel University
- Occupation: Actress
- Years active: 2007–present

Amber Rose Revah (born 24 June 1986) is a British actress and writer. She is known for playing Dinah Madani in Marvel's The Punisher.

== Early life and education ==
Amber Rose Revah was born in London to a mother of Polish Jewish background, while her biological father is of Kenyan Indian heritage. She has credited her maternal grandmother for getting her interested in acting at an early age by introducing her to theatre as a child. She studied Contemporary Performance at Brunel University.

== Career ==
Revah made her first on-screen appearance in the 2007 film The World Unseen before playing Saddam Hussein's daughter in her first TV role in the miniseries House of Saddam. Since then Revah has featured in 13 more feature films and 14 more television series.

Amber Rose lived in Malaysia while playing Leena in two seasons of the Channel 4 and PBS colonial period drama Indian Summers with Julie Walters, and appeared in Luc Besson's and Pierre Morels' From Paris With Love opposite John Travolta.

Revah is best known for portraying Dinah Madani in Marvel and Netflix's The Punisher TV series opposite Jon Bernthal and Ben Barnes for which she received a nomination for 'Outstanding Actress in a Drama'. She is also known for her portrayal of Dr. Grace Hogart in the Amazon Prime Video sci-fi series The Peripheral and as Mary Magdalene in the movie Son of God.

== Filmography ==
=== Film ===
| Year | Title | Role | Notes |
|---|---|---|---|
| 2007 | The World Unseen | Begum | |
| 2008 | I Can't Think Straight | Yasmin | |
| 2009 | Henna Night | Amina | Short film |
| 2009 | Agora | Sidonia | |
| 2009 | Taylors Trophy | Lester's Dream Girl | Short film |
| 2010 | From Paris with Love | Nichole | |
| 2011 | The Devil's Double | Bride | |
| 2011 | Everywhere and Nowhere | Yasmin | |
| 2011 | Aazaan | Sofiya | |
| 2011 | Love After Sunrise | – | Short film |
| 2014 | Son of God | Mary Magdalene | |
| 2016 | London Life | Anita | |
| 2020 | Concrete Plans | Amy | |
| 2022 | The Trouble With Jessica | Ellen | |
| 2026 | Greenland 2: Migration | Dr. Amina | |

=== Television ===
| Year | Title | Role | Notes |
|---|---|---|---|
| 2008 | House of Saddam | Hala Hussein; Saddam's daughter | Miniseries; Episodes: "Part I", "Part IV" |
| 2011 | Borgia | Maacah Bat-Talmai | 3 episodes |
| 2012 | The Mystery of Edwin Drood | Helena Landless | Miniseries |
| 2013 | The Bible | Mary Magdalene | Miniseries; 4 episodes |
| 2013 | What Remains | Vidya Khan | 4 episodes |
| 2014 | Women of the Bible | Mary Magdalene | TV movie |
| 2015 | Foyle's War | Lea Fisher | Episode: "Trespass" |
| 2015 | Silent Witness | Yasmin | Episodes: "Squaring the Circle: Part 1" and "Squaring the Circle: Part 2" |
| 2015–2016 | Indian Summers | Leena Prasad | 14 episodes |
| 2016 | Midsomer Murders | Jessica Myerscough | Episode: "Harvest of Souls" |
| 2017 | Emerald City | Miranda | 4 episodes |
| 2017–2019 | The Punisher | Dinah Madani | Main role; 26 episodes |
| 2019 | Made in Hollywood | Herself | 1 episode |
| 2021 | The Trick | Lisa Tremble | TV movie |
| 2022 | The Peripheral | Grace | 2 episodes |
| 2022 | Last Light | Mika Bakhash | 5 episode |
| 2025 | The Sandman | Ishtar | Episode: "Brief Lives" |

=== Video games ===
| Year | Title | Role | Notes |
|---|---|---|---|
| 2022 | The Waylanders | Nazhedja | Voice |
