= Turk Barrett =

Fictional character in Marvel Comics

Publication information
- First appearance: Daredevil #69 (Oct. 1970)
- Created by: Roy Thomas; Gene Colan

In-story information
- Species: Human
- Team affiliations: Infinity Watch
- Notable aliases: Mauler; Stilt-Man

Turk Barrett is a fictional character appearing in American comic books published by Marvel Comics. The character is usually depicted in stories featuring Daredevil, in which his inept schemes are played as comic relief.

Barrett was a recurring character in the Marvel shows Daredevil (2015-2016), Luke Cage (2016-2018), The Defenders (2017), The Punisher (2017-2019), Jessica Jones (2018), and Iron Fist (2018) set in the Marvel Cinematic Universe (MCU), portrayed by Rob Morgan.

== Publication history ==
Turk Barrett first appeared in Daredevil #69 (October 1970) and was created by writer Roy Thomas and artist Gene Colan.

Initially introduced as a member of the Hell's Kitchen street gang known as the Thunderbolts, Barrett developed into a recurring background antagonist in Frank Miller's acclaimed run on Daredevil during the early 1980s. Writer Frank Miller and artist Klaus Janson utilized Barrett as comic relief, frequently depicting his botched criminal schemes, such as his disastrous attempts to steal and operate the armored suits of supervillains like Mauler in Daredevil #179 (February 1982) and Stilt-Man in Daredevil #229 (April 1986).

Though primarily associated with *Daredevil*, Barrett has appeared across various other Marvel Comics titles over the decades. In 2018, writer Gerry Duggan prominently featured Barrett in the crossover event Infinity Countdown, where the small-time criminal unexpectedly comes into possession of the Mind Gem and briefly joins Doctor Strange's reformed Infinity Watch.

== Fictional character biography ==
Turk Barrett was a small-time crook operating in Hell's Kitchen, Manhattan. Roscoe Sweeney once sent Barrett to pay Jack Murdock to throw a boxing match. Barrett was associated with a street gang called the Thunderbolts. Barrett later stole Stilt-Man's armor, offering his services but the Kingpin declined to employ "idiots", and Wilbur Day contacted Daredevil with knowledge of how to defeat him. Barrett has spent quite a bit of time at Josie's Bar in New York City. His criminal associate Grotto often reluctantly participates in Barrett's schemes. Barrett once mugged someone at Christmas and intended to use the Yuletide attire of Santa Claus to swindle charitable donations. When Matt Murdock told him to take the Santa suit off, Barrett stabbed him with a knife, thus carelessly foiling his own plan by getting blood on the suit.

During the 2018 "Infinity Countdown" storyline, Barrett comes into possession of the Mind Gem. Doctor Strange tries to take the Mind Gem back, only for Barrett to evade him. Barrett is among the Infinity Gem holders who are contacted by Strange to reform the Infinity Watch and safeguard the Infinity Gems. Barrett later returns the Mind Gem to Strange, frightened by its power.

== Other versions ==
Various versions of Turk Barrett have appeared across the character's publication history. In "House of M", Barrett is a member of Willis Stryker's gang, which is later taken over by Luke Cage. In Secret Wars, two versions of Barrett appear as residents of Battleworld.

== In other media ==
Turk Barrett is a recurring character across the Marvel's Netflix television series set in the Marvel Cinematic Universe (MCU), portrayed by Rob Morgan. This version is an associate of Wilson Fisk and is engaged in smuggling and arms dealing. Introduced in Daredevil, Barrett makes subsequent appearances in Luke Cage, The Defenders, The Punisher, Jessica Jones, and Iron Fist.
