= List of Punisher supporting characters =

This is a list of characters associated with the Marvel Comics character Punisher.

== Family ==
=== Tree ===
Punisher family tree

Fredo Castiglione	Mario Castiglione	Louisa Castiglione	Rocco Castiglione	Esmerelda Castiglione
Elektra Natchios (Note: In the continuity of Marvel 2099 only.)	Francis G. "Frank" Castle (Castiglione) Senior; The Punisher / Cosmic Ghost Rider	Maria Elizabeth "Angel" Castle
Cossandra Natchios (Castle); Punisher 2099	Thanos Castle; The Punisher (Note: In the continuity of Cosmic Ghost Rider only.)	Lisa Barbara Castle	Francis David "Frank" Castle Junior
Franklin "Frank" Natchios; Punisher 2099

=== Frank Castle Jr. ===
Francis David "Frank" Castle Jr. is the son of The Punisher (Frank Castle) in Marvel Comics. The character, created by Gerry Conway and Tony DeZuniga, first appeared in Marvel Preview #2 (Aug. 1975).

Frank Jr. was Frank Castle Sr.'s son and youngest child. Frank Jr. took after his father, and was one of the main reasons from retiring from the Marines. One day, the Castle family decided to have a picnic in Central Park to which they accidentally witness a mob execution and are gunned down. Frank Sr. is the only survivor with his family's death which sends him over the edge into being the Punisher.

==== Frank Castle Jr. in other media ====
- A character based on Frank Castle Jr. named Will Castle appears in The Punisher (2004), portrayed by Marcus Johns. He travels with his parents to Puerto Rico to celebrate Frank's retirement at a family reunion before he and his mother are run over by hired men sent by crime lord, Howard Saint.
- Frank Castle Jr. appears in Marvel's Netflix television series:
  - He first appears in the second season of Daredevil via photographs.
  - Frank Jr. appears in flashbacks depicted in The Punisher (2017), portrayed by Aidan Pierce Brennan. This version idolized his father, Frank Castle Sr., who was concerned that he was being a bad influence on his son.
  - Frank Jr. appears in flashbacks depicted in The Punisher: One Last Kill (2026), portrayed by Eduardo Campirano.

=== Lisa Castle ===
Lisa Barbara Castle is the daughter of the Punisher in Marvel Comics. The character, created by Gerry Conway and Tony DeZuniga, first appeared in Marvel Preview #2 (Aug. 1975).

Lisa was Frank Castle's daughter and oldest child. Lisa was the light in Frank's life and one of the main reasons from retiring from the Marines. One day, the Castle family decided to have a picnic in Central Park where they accidentally witness a mob execution and are gunned down. Frank being the only survivor of his family's death sends him over the edge into being the Punisher.

==== Lisa Castle in other media ====
- Two characters loosely based on Lisa Castle named Annie and Felice Castle appear in The Punisher (1989), portrayed by Brooke Anderson and Holly Rogers respectively. They and their mother are killed by a car bomb meant for Frank Castle.
- Lisa Castle appears in television series set in the Marvel Cinematic Universe (MCU):
  - Lisa first appears in the second season of Daredevil (2016) via photographs.
  - Lisa appears in flashbacks depicted in The Punisher (2017), portrayed by Nicolette Pierini.
  - Lisa appears in The Punisher: One Last Kill (2026), portrayed by Addie Bernthal.

=== Maria Castle ===
Maria Elizabeth Castle (née Falconio) is the wife of Frank Castle in Marvel Comics. The character, created by Gerry Conway and Tony DeZuniga, first appeared in Marvel Preview #2 (Aug. 1975).

Maria was Frank's loving wife. Together they had two children (Lisa Castle and Frank Castle Jr.) and maintained a very tranquil family life. After coming home from the war, Maria made sure that Frank's life was held together. One day, the Castle family decided to have a picnic in Central Park where they accidentally witness a mob execution and are gunned down. Frank survives but Maria and their children were killed.

==== Maria Castle in other media ====
- A character based on Maria Castle named Julie Castle appears in The Punisher (1989), portrayed by May Lloyd. She was killed by a car bomb alongside her and Frank Castle's two daughters.
- Maria Castle appears in The Punisher (2004), portrayed by Samantha Mathis. This version travels to Puerto Rico to celebrate her husband's retirement at a family reunion before she and her son Will Castle are run over by hired men sent by the crime lord, Howard Saint.
- Maria Castle appears in Marvel's Netflix television series:
  - Maria first appears in the second season of Daredevil, portrayed by Lauren Gray Weinerth.
  - Maria appears in flashbacks and visions depicted in The Punisher (2017) and The Punisher: One Last Kill (2026), portrayed by Kelli Barrett.

== Allies ==
=== Amy Bendix ===
Amy Bendix is a young girl. The character, created by Larry Hama and John Buscema, first appeared in The Punisher War Zone #24 (Feb. 1994).

Amy is a happy young girl who is mentally handicapped and lives in Laastekist. One day, she encounters Frank Castle (otherwise known as the Punisher) hiding underneath a truck. Castle asks Amy not to tell and she complies. Amy soon afterwards hides Castle in her tree house, where it becomes apparent that Amy reminds Castle of his daughter. Amy accidentally tells her father Sheriff Harry Bendix, who comes with two other officers to capture Castle. Against Amy's wishes, Harry beats up Castle, placing him in jail. When Castle's fingerprints get leaked, several men break into Sheriff Bendix's house and hold Amy at gunpoint. Amy manages to escape the house and tries to look for her father, but is captured by anti-vigilante agent Taylor Blackwell. Castle manages to stall Blackwell long enough for Sheriff Bendix to snipe the man down saving Amy. Amy is taken to safety and left at a neighbor's house while her father helps evacuate the town.

==== Amy Bendix in other media ====
Amy Bendix appears in The Punisher, portrayed by Giorgia Whigham. This version is a teenage grifter who witnessed the murder of several of her friends and went on the run ever since. After being saved by Frank Castle, she is eventually taken under his wing and forms a strong friendship with him.

=== Carlos Cruz ===
Carlos "CC" Cruz is a former SWAT/United States Navy SEALs who befriended Microchip while he had a falling out with Frank Castle. After Microchip is killed, Cruz blames Castle for his death. Cruz tracks down Castle and finds him stalking a group of Bolivian drug dealers. Cruz attacks Castle, attracting the gun-fire of the Bolivians as well. Separated by the chaos of the battle, Cruz is killed by Microchip's actual killer, Stone Cold. Castle eventually avenges Cruz by killing Stone Cold himself.

=== Andy Lorimer ===
Andy Lorimer is a lance corporal in the Parachute Regiment of the British Army who tags along with Yorkie Mitchell to New York City to track down a group of former IRA members who attacked an Irish bar in Hell's Kitchen. Lorimer and Mitchell link up with Castle and agree to fight alongside him against the Irish-American gangs of New York. Yorkie brings him along as a favor because one of the IRA members, Peter Cooley, killed Lorimer's father during the closing days of The Troubles. Lorimer's father, SAS Sergeant Major Stephen Lorimer, saved Yorkie's life in the past, and so he sees it as a way of repaying his fallen friend by allowing his son a chance to avenge his death. While a competent soldier, Lorimer begins to have doubts on the validity of their mission given how much killing is involved. Once their mission is complete and all of the IRA members and their associates have been killed, Lorimer is given the opportunity to execute Cooley. He does so, but upon returning to Yorkie, he tells him that his death did not bring him any sense of closure or satisfaction. The two return home to England.

=== George Howe ===
First appeared in The Punisher vol. 6 #55.

An African-American, George Howe served as a young man in the Vietnam War. In the summer of 1969, his UH-1 Huey helicopter crashed near the border with Laos; the Viet Cong soon arrived to take the survivors to their own base, where one by one they were killed, their hands and feet chopped off and tossed into Howe's bamboo cage. When it seemed that his time had come, a Marine Force Recon group led by Captain Castle attacked the village and rescued Howe. In 1972, Howe was awarded the Medal of Honor. Admiring the Force Recon Marines for their proficiency, Howe joined the Green Berets for the remainder of the war and was among the first to join Delta Force. Howe is tasked by a cabal of military generals to arrest Castle, but then learns of the actual truth behind Castle's covert operation in Russia. Howe gives Castle the means of killing the generals by giving him a loaded M1911 handgun, and destroys the incriminating evidence out of the belief that if exposed, the U.S. military would lose all sense of credibility.

Howe's assistant, Lieutenant Geller, reads Castle's military record and realizes that not only was Castle a Force Recon Marine, he also led the team that saved Howe's life in Vietnam; thus, Howe would spare Castle's life as repayment out of gratitude. Geller attempts to warn the generals, but it is too late. As the generals arrive at Howe's safehouse to collect the incriminating tape and view Castle's body, Howe walks away, saying he has washed his hands clean of the matter, but in reality, Howe has lured the generals to their deaths.

=== Henry Russo ===
Henry Russo first appeared in The Punisher vol. 7 #1 (March 2009), and has gone on to become a recurring character in that series, as well as appearing alongside the Punisher in other series, such as Anti-Venom and Deadpool: Suicide Kings. Russo is the child of Jigsaw, and as a child, Russo's father would neglect and abuse him. In a pivotal incident, Jigsaw beat Russo for letting a cat inside their house. He then pulled a gun on Russo's mother and told him that if he did not drown the cat he (Jigsaw) would shoot her. Russo did, and was left traumatised by this incident.

Russo possesses no superhuman powers or abilities, although he is extremely skilled at using and hacking computers.

=== Jen Cooke ===
First appeared in The Punisher vol. 5 #24.

A liberal activist and social worker, Cooke was kidnapped by a cult of tunnel dwelling homeless cannibals and rescued by Castle, but condemned his brutal methods, pointing out that the men who kidnapped her were homeless and desperate, with some having severe mental problems. While he initially shrugs off her tirade, Castle gives the cultists a chance to escape while he goes after their leader. Years later, Cooke is investigating the East European sex slavery trade and begrudgingly helps Castle go after a Romanian gang which was running a series of brothels.

=== Jenny Cesare ===
First appeared in The Punisher vol. 6 #43.

Jenny was born into the Cesare crime family and once she was old enough was introduced to her husband Tim Buccato by her sister Annabella and other Mafia wives. Tim seemed nice at first but after they were married he became extremely abusive both physically, sexually and mentally beginning on their wedding night. He beat her, raped her, and even allowed men he barely knew to come over and abuse her sexually. Jenny's sister and her friends knew he was like this before hand, but kept her in the relationship and did not help at all. Tim was killed by the Punisher; on the same day, Jenny was diagnosed with breast cancer.

Jenny underwent a double mastectomy and learned weapon handling and cop skills over the years. She finally returned to New York City to get revenge on her sister and her friends, but found out they were planning on killing the Punisher in revenge for having killed all of their husbands. Wanting to save the life of the man that saved her by killing her husband, she rescued the Punisher and then donned the Punisher's death head shirt and took out the wives, ending with beating her sister to death with a baseball bat. After that was done, Jenny had sex with the Punisher in a last attempt to feel something and committed suicide when they were done, still unable to feel anything from the sex and aware she was still dying of cancer, leaving the Punisher forced to watch her commit suicide.

==== Jenny Cesare in other media ====
Jenny Cesare appears as a NPC in The Punisher: No Mercy.

=== Joan ===
Joan is a fictional character in the Marvel Comics Universe. She first appeared in The Punisher vol. 4 #1.

Joan is a tenant in the apartment where Frank Castle lived for a time under the alias John Smith. An extremely shy, frightened and timid character, Joan is terrified of living in the city and wishes to move to the countryside, but does not have the money to do so. Along with her friends, Bumpo and Spacker Dave, she receives a portion of the Gnucci family's money which she used to buy a cottage in the countryside as she wanted. Years later, Castle is wounded in a fight with the Russian mob and stumbles upon Joan's abode. She tends to him, and, despite his request that she run for her life and leave him to fend for himself, insists on helping him instead.

==== Joan in other media ====
- Joan appears in The Punisher (2004), portrayed by Rebecca Romijn. This version is more willing to approach Castle and has an abusive ex-boyfriend, who Castle drives off. Following his fight with the Russian, Joan nurses Castle back to health and later invites him to dinner. Castle gently rejects her advances and later leaves her and her fellow tenants money he stole from Howard Saint and his criminal enterprise.
- Joan appears in The Punisher (2005), voiced by Julie Nathanson.

=== Kathryn O'Brien ===
First appeared in The Punisher vol. 6 #1.

O'Brien first appeared as a CIA agent and part of a task force to apprehend him and recruit him into the hunt for Osama bin Laden, when she expressed sexual attraction to Castle and a desire to sleep with him. The mission ultimately failed, and O'Brien's superior had her sent to prison. During her time there, she was routinely harassed by a gang of inmates, who were never able to beat her in a fight, so they framed her for the murder of a guard instead. O'Brien fled the prison and went to a fellow former CIA agent for help, and once there, she learned of the events surrounding Nicky Cavella's desecration of the Castle family graves, and that Bill Rawlins, her ex-husband, was in town. Deciding to kill her husband before she could make good her escape, she caught him as he was about to shoot Castle with a sniper rifle, as he and Cavella were in league. O'Brien assists Castle in interrogating her ex-husband in his role for the covert operation in Russia. She later travels to Afghanistan to kill ex-Taliban officers under American and British protection for playing a role in raping her. While in Afghanistan, O'Brien is killed after stepping on a land mine. Prior to her disappearance, O'Brien gave birth to a daughter named Sarah, the product of a one-night stand with Castle, who is in the protective custody of her sister.

She revealed to Castle that the CIA recruited had her in her senior year at Princeton University.

=== Lynn Michaels ===
Lynn Michaels was a police officer who teamed up with Castle to take down a serial rapist and later quit the force to become a vigilante.

=== Martin Soap ===
Martin Soap was secretly allied with the Punisher and gave him information on his targets from the police database.

=== Max ===
Max is an attack dog owned by the Punisher. Created by Mike Baron, he first appeared in The Punisher vol. 2 #54 (Nov. 1991). Max was a puppy that was picked up off the street to be trained as an attack dog. One day a local gang broke into the building Max was kept in and attacked the crooks. The Punisher arrived and defeated the last one before adopting the dog as his own. Since then, Max had become a close companion to Frank Castle and even Microchip to an extent. Even when Max was stolen away to be trained in dog fights, he never forgot his true master and was quick to return to him.

==== Max in other media ====
Max appears in the second season of Daredevil, portrayed by dog actor Bull. The Punisher rescues Max from the Kitchen Irish after killing the majority of them. Finn Cooley later kidnaps Max and threatens to torture him if Frank does not give up the location of his money.

=== Molly von Richthofen ===
NYPD Lieutenant Molly Elizabeth Chrysanthema Olga von Richthofen first appeared in The Punisher vol. 4 #4. She is a talented investigator who, as punishment for refusing to sleep with the NYPD Commissioner, was assigned to take down the Gnucci crime family. During their investigation, Martin Soap fell in love with von Richthofen, who rebuffed Soap due to being lesbian. When Soap becomes Commissioner, von Richthofen leaves on vacation.

A few years later, von Richthofen returns to New York and rejoins the NYPD. However, she is still disfavored by her male superiors and assigned to the Punisher Task Force. Ironically, von Richthofen is forced to fight alongside the Punisher. She is publicly exposed as a Punisher sympathizer and subsequently suspended, pending a formal investigation.

Staci Strobl and Nickie D. Phillips examined the character in their book Comic Book Crime: Truth, Justice, and the American Way, noting her "lesbian as psychopath" motif The Punisher: War Zone vol. 2, and writing, "Molly's violence may be interpreted as rage against the patriarchal constraints under which she operates both at work and at home, and is always infused, at least implicitly, with her sexuality. While Molly is certainly a competent law enforcement officer, her honor and integrity are belied by her abuse of power. Violence is used as one means of negotiating her sexual orientation, which is never far removed from her objectification as a female. In her confrontation with the Mafia, she partners with Punisher and in the process undergoes numerous humiliations culminating in a "bra and panties" showdown captured by the media. There is space for the lesbian crime fighter, but only firmly in its place within masculine hegemony. As The New York Globe headlines reported the showdown, "Lethal Weapons! Sexy Lesbian Lieutenant in Punisher Team-Up Carnage!"

==== Molly von Richthofen in other media ====
Molly von Richthofen appears in The Punisher, voiced by Julie Nathanson.

=== Nathaniel Bumpo ===
Nathaniel Bumpo is a fictional character in the Marvel Comics Universe. He first appeared in The Punisher vol. 4 #1.

A tenant in the apartment building where Frank Castle lived for a time under the name of John Smith. Grossly overweight and requiring Castle's help to get through the door of his apartment, Bumpo once suffered a heart attack and the paramedics had to destroy part of the building's wall and use a crane to take him to the hospital. Shortly after he is released, the Russian attacks Castle at his home. After a vicious fight, Castle uses Bumpo to smother the Russian.

==== Nathaniel Bumpo in other media ====
Nathaniel Bumpo appears in The Punisher, portrayed by John Pinette. This version displays no trouble with his living quarters along with a comical personality. Additionally, he and his fellow tenants receive money that Frank Castle took from Howard Saint and his criminal enterprise.

=== Oscar Clemons ===
- Further reading: Oscar Clemons at the Comic Book DB (archived from the original); Oscar Clemons at the Grand Comics Database

Det. Oscar "Ozzy" Clemons first appeared in The Punisher #1 (Oct. 2011), created by Greg Rucka and Marco Checchetto in the likeness of Morgan Freeman.

Oscar Clemons had a personal grudge against the Punisher due to a botched case. Clemons has since held on to a knife that he obtained from that case. He was paired up with the younger detective Walter Bolt to investigate the recent massacre of a wedding with the sole survivor being the bride Rachel Cole. Clemons and Bolt meet with Rachel to get information, but cause Cole to become manic after learning the woman's husband died. Soon after, they witness the Punisher battling and killing the Vulture (Jimmy Natale) and investigate the crime scene with Carlie Cooper afterwards. Clemons and Bolt soon begin investigating the possibility that the Punisher has a partner whom they believe to be Rachel. They hold a stakeout outside Cole's apartment and are later approached by Norah Winters who lies to them about having seen Rachel. Clemons realizes that the Punisher and Rachel are after Christian Poulsen and his suspicions are proven true when two cops are killed (the Punisher does not kill cops). But during a police raid, Bolt is accidentally killed by Rachel. Despite this, Clemons tries to convince the police captain that Poulsen's actions are what caused Rachel to act irrationally. After a lengthy chase, Clemons captures Rachel after the woman attempts to die by police fire which is thwarted by the Punisher who removed the gun pins.

==== Oscar Clemons in other media ====
Oscar Clemons appears in Jessica Jones, portrayed by Clarke Peters. This version is a veteran detective who is two years away from mandatory retirement with a full pension. After being assigned to a case involving Kilgrave, Clemons has several encounters with Jessica Jones before he is killed by Will Simpson amidst the latter's own search for Kilgrave.

=== Paul Budiansky ===
Paul Budiansky first appeared in The Punisher vol. 7 #44 (March 2007, created by Garth Ennis and Lan Medina. A NYPD police officer, Budiansky heroically entered a school that was being held hostage by a deranged killer against orders and shot him. Despite this, he was disciplined and forced into therapy, wondering if he was like the Punisher. Budiansky then began investigating a gang of supposed criminals, The Five Wives. The Wives were accused of killing one of their own which they denied. Certain of their crime he investigated deeper and the Wives sent a hitman after him.

While visiting his wife Gina in the hospital, the hitman attempts to kill Budiansky, but accidentally shots Gina. Budiansky brutally kills the hitman and Gina survives, but is put on life-support. Having had enough, Budiansky visited the Wives in an effort to get revenge, only to discover that Jenny Cesare had killed three of the Wives and was taking the last one to be killed. Budiansky follows, but encounters the Punisher and demands that he be let through causing the Punisher to ask, "You want to be me?" Following these words, Budiansky gave up, realizing he was not the Punisher.

==== Paul Budiansky in other media ====
Paul Budiansky appears in Punisher: War Zone, portrayed by Colin Salmon. This version is a corrupt former narcotics specialist for the FBI. Despite using cocaine that the FBI seized, his partner Nicky Donatelli refused to turn him in. Paul eventually overcame his addiction, but Nicky was accidentally killed by the Punisher. Upon learning what happened, Paul joins Martin Soap and the "Punisher Task Force" to bring the Punisher to justice, unaware that they are sympathetic to the vigilante's cause. Realizing the system does not work, Paul later helps the Punisher take down Jigsaw.

=== Spacker Dave ===
First appeared in The Punisher vol. 4 #1.

A heavily pierced young tenant in the apartment building where Castle lived for a time under the alias of John Smith. He did little but hang about on the building's doorstep, but recognized "Smith" as the Punisher, something which he inadvertently divulged to mobsters who came looking for him. Despite being tortured by having his piercings pulled out and carving his name into his forehead, he does not betray Castle. Dave received a portion of Ma Gnucci's money after leaving the hospital, and later inspired an underground movement called the "Spackers" who had bandaged faces similar to his. He reappeared years later, now no longer wearing any piercings or bandages, and had taken up the hobby of superhero spotting, much to Castle's chagrin. Dave is trampled by the Hulk, rendering him quadriplegic, which does not hamper his fascination with superheroes.

==== Spacker Dave in other media ====
- Spacker Dave appears in The Punisher (2004), portrayed by Ben Foster. This version is more serious than his comics counterpart. Additionally, the money he and his fellow tenants receive from Frank Castle came from Howard Saint and his criminal enterprise.
- Spacker Dave appears in The Punisher (2005), voiced by Chris Edgerly.

=== Steve Goodwin ===
First appeared in The Punisher: Born #1.

A young Marine serving under then-Captain Frank Castle at Firebase Valley Forge near the Cambodian border toward the end of Castle's third tour in Vietnam. He was one of the better natured U.S. Marines at the base, keeping away from drugs and taking the time to ease the springs in the magazines of his rifle. His tour of Vietnam was coming to an end, and he clung to Castle in a desperate attempt to stay alive, believing that Castle's prowess as a combatant would guarantee his safety. The events of The Punisher: Born are told largely from his perspective and narrated by him. On the night he was thirty-seven days from being discharged, the garrison was attacked by combined forces of NVA and Viet Cong. Of the Marines, Castle and Goodwin held out the longest, and Goodwin got to see air support arrive, only to be bayoneted seconds later. In his dying moments, he hallucinates of the bayonet missing him, being whisked away onto a passenger jet where he is tended to by attractive stewardesses as he previously wished.

=== Yorkie Mitchell ===
First appeared in The Punisher vol. 5 #18.

Lieutenant Colonel Yorkie Mitchell was an operative of MI6 and the SAS. Yorkie first met Castle in 1971, while they were serving in Vietnam, when they were both taking part in a cross-training exercise with the Australian SAS. On one occasion, Yorkie saved Castle from being burned alive by the Viet Cong. He once helped Castle by supplying information about a cocaine shipment that had made its way into Belfast, Northern Ireland, and later teamed up with him to take down Finn Cooley, a former Provisional IRA terrorist and current Irish gangster. He then was assigned to Afghanistan, where he provided security to ex-Taliban who had turned into informants for the coalition. As a favor to Castle, he was able to secure the release of Kathryn O'Brien after he was supposed to execute her, an act that cost him his job. He did not mind it, however, expressing that he wanted to retire anyway. He and his wife were later murdered by Barracuda, who was looking for leverage against Castle.

== Enemies ==
=== Cristu Bulat ===
Cristu Bulat was a character in Marvel Comics. He first appeared in The Punisher vol. 6 #25. He was a Romanian criminal specializing in brothels where East European abductees are forced into prostitution. Son of notorious Yugoslav Wars freedom fighter and crime boss Tiberiu Bulat. He was eviscerated alive by the Punisher for information.

==== Cristu Bulat in other media ====
Cristu Bulat appears in Punisher: War Zone, portrayed by David Vadim. This version is a rival of the Cesare crime family. While attempting to smuggle biological weapons into the U.S., he is sold out by Jigsaw and arrested by the authorities.

=== Elite ===
The original Elite first appeared in The Punisher vol. 4 #5. His son Tim, the second Elite, first appeared in The Punisher: War Zone vol. 2 #1 (2009).

The first Elite was a fascist and racist vigilante who killed gang members, drug dealers and other criminals who "lower the tone" in his upper-class neighborhood. Elite later joined up with Mr. Payback and the Holy to form the Vigilante Squad, planning to exterminate all of New York City's criminals.

After the Elite is killed by the Punisher, his son Tim takes up his father's alter ego and vows to avenge his murder. The Elite sets up an elaborate scheme that at first, makes Castle believe his old nemesis, Ma Gnucci, was still alive. Aided by Molly von Richtofen, Castle kills Elite and his allies.

=== Finn Cooley ===
Finn Cooley is a fictional character in the Marvel Comics Universe. He first appeared in The Punisher vol. 6 #7.

A hideously disfigured Irish terrorist, an Irish mob boss and a demolitions expert, Cooley was formerly an Active Service Unit leader with the Provisional IRA in Derry, Northern Ireland, from 1986 to 1993, when he was arrested, interrogated by the Royal Ulster Constabulary (RUC) at Castlereagh, convicted of murder and terrorism and sent to prison, but was released as part of the Good Friday Agreement in 1998. After Cooley was freed, he tried to join the Continuity IRA, but that unit disavowed him, so Finn came to America. Cooley had to wear a facial mask as half of his face was blown off in an explosives accident, when the bomb he planted at a Belfast RUC police station prematurely detonated.

In 2003, Cooley planted fifty pounds of Semtex at an Irish bar in Hell's Kitchen in order to kill several rival Irish mob bosses, but the bomb went off prematurely, killing 11 and injuring 30 innocent people, one of whom was Frank Castle; Castle's friend MI6 agent Yorkie Mitchell informed Castle who was responsible and provided MI6's intel files on Cooley and his associates; MI6 also ordered Mitchell to assassinate Cooley. Cooley is killed by a bomb left behind by recently deceased Irish mob boss Pops Nesbitt, who thought Cooley and his rivals were unworthy of inheriting his fortune.

Cooley's nephew Peter Cooley was a Provisional IRA soldier from 1994 to 1998, who served as his uncle's right-hand man, and was a prime suspect in the murders of three British security forces soldiers, but was never arrested or convicted; one of the victims was Sergeant Major Stephen Lorimer, a close friend of Mitchell. Peter was captured by Castle & Mitchell, interrogated for information about Finn and the New York Irish mob leaders, then executed by Parachute Regiment trooper Lance Corporal Andy Lorimer, in revenge for his father's murder.

==== Finn Cooley in other media ====
- Finn Cooley appears as a playable character in The Punisher: No Mercy.
- Finn Cooley appears in the Daredevil episode "Penny and Dime", portrayed by Tony Curran. This version is a hotheaded and impulsive high-ranking member of the Irish Mob. After his son Kelly Cooley is killed by Frank Castle, who also stole the Irish Mob's money, Finn places a bounty on him before he and his men capture him. Following a failed interrogation regarding the stolen money, Castle breaks free and interrogates Finn for information on his family's deaths before killing him.

=== General Kreigkopf ===
First appeared in The Punisher vol. 5 #2.

A former United States Marine Corps General who was infamous for committing war atrocities, later becoming a terrorist leader. During the Vietnam War, Lieutenant Kreigkopf allowed his Marines to pillage the town of Ap Duc and rape its women, as a reward for defending the town. In the 1980s, during the Contra War, Major Kreigkopf was directly responsible for the deaths of 426 Sandinistas, two-thirds of which were killed with nerve agents. During Operation Desert Storm, Colonel Kreigkopf ordered his Marines to use half of a company of Iraqi prisoners for bayonet practice. However, none of the war crimes were ever proven, a testament to Kreigkopf's influence with military leaders.

As a general, Kreigkopf struck a lance corporal in the neck with a rifle butt for insubordination, rendering him quadriplegic. Before Kreigkopf could face a court-martial, he was smuggled out of the United States by the CIA, as he was considered a valuable asset by them, for conducting black ops on their behalf. Nevertheless, the court-martial proceeded with Kreigkopf in absentia: he was dismissed from the Marine Corps and stripped of rank.

Kreigkopf flees to Grand Nixon Island in the South Pacific, where he establishes a mercenary base and hires disgraced special forces and black ops operators, hitmen and sociopaths, as mercenaries and terrorists. When the Punisher foils Kreigkopf's plan to eliminate the European Union (EU) leaders in Brussels, Kreigkopf orders the hijacking of a French military aircraft carrying a hydrogen bomb and have it destroy the EU leaders. As the French aircraft taxis down the runway, the Punisher confronts Kreigkopf on the runway before throwing the Russian out with the nuclear weapon chained to him. The resulting nuclear explosion destroys Grand Nixon Island, killing Kreigkopf and his allies.

==== General Kreigkopf in other media ====
Kreigkopf appears in The Punisher (2005), voiced by Bob Joles.

=== Holy ===
First appeared in The Punisher vol. 4 #2.

Father Hector Redondo, who called himself "The Holy", is an insane Catholic priest in Spanish Harlem who uses a fireman's axe to kill criminals who confessed their sins to him. He believes killing "evil" people is God's will, and is later inspired by the Punisher to form the Vigilante Squad, consisting of the Holy, Elite and Mr. Payback. Redondo knows that he is a killer and shows remorse after each of his murders, praying for absolution and forgiveness for his sins, only to subsequently commit more murders and pray after each one.

The Punisher uses Detective Soap's notes to find Redondo, whose church was the place where all of the victims came to confess their sins. The Punisher barges into the Holy's office to confront the Vigilante Squad, who attempt to recruit the Punisher as their leader. He is unmoved by their pleas and kills all three members of the Vigilante Squad.

=== Ink ===
Ink is one of Nicky Cavella's bodyguards/enforcers. He received his nickname when he killed his first man by stabbing a pen through the man's eye and into his brain. Ink was a skilled cook: he murdered, then butchered and cooked up the son of mob boss David Kai, who mistook his son's flesh for pork until Cavella told him what it really was. Ink was killed during a battle between Cavella's mobsters and CIA agents who were negotiating with Frank Castle.

==== Ink in other media ====
Ink appears in Punisher: War Zone, portrayed by Keram Malicki-Sánchez. This version is a young man, enforcer for Jigsaw, and son of Carmine "Pittsy" Gazzera.

=== Maginty ===
Maginty first appeared in The Punisher vol. 6 #8. An Afro–Irish crime lord in Hell's Kitchen, he was one of the four gang lords who would receive a share of Pops Nesbitt's fortune, which turned out to be a bomb, killing Maginty and the other gang leaders.

==== Maginty in other media ====
Maginty appears in Punisher: War Zone, portrayed by T. J. Storm. This version is an enforcer for Jigsaw who engages in parkour.

=== Mr. Payback ===
First appeared in The Punisher vol. 4 #5.

A vigilante who despised corporations and the corrupt, especially those who disregard the safety and well-being of the working class. He gunned down the entire Board of Directors of the World-Wide Investment Corporation (WIC); Payback later used a FIM-92 Stinger missile to destroy a WIC helicopter that killed the company's CEO, attorney and helicopter pilot. Payback deduced the location of Elite's neighborhood and found Elite gunning down a marijuana dealer. Payback convinced Elite to join him, and the duo stumbled across The Holy, forming the Vigilante Squad.

Just as the Vigilante Squad decided that they needed the Punisher to lead them, the topic of discussion himself stormed into the room. An awed Mr. Payback told the Punisher that he was their inspiration. After insulting The Holy and Elite, the Punisher informed Payback that he had killed four innocent people during his quest for justice, to which Payback responded that there have to be sacrifices in war. The Punisher barges into the Holy's office to confront the Vigilante Squad, who attempt to recruit the Punisher as their leader. He is unmoved by their pleas and kills all three members of the Vigilante Squad.

=== Nicky Cavella ===
Nicolas "Nicky" Cavella first appeared in The Punisher vol. 6 #2. He was a psychotic captain in the Cesare crime family. At the age of eight, he killed his father, mother and sister, then framed his uncle for the murders at the suggestion of his aunt in order for her to become captain of the Cavella family; when Nicky turned 18, she took him as a lover and protege until he one day smothered her to death, thus becoming capo of his family. He was one of the few criminals to have survived an encounter with the Punisher. However, when he desecrated the Castle family's graves to lure out the Punisher so he can kill him once and for all, he was kidnapped by the Punisher and shot in the stomach, leaving him to die slowly of blood poisoning.

==== Nicky Calvella in other media ====
"Nicky Calvella" appears in Punisher: War Zone as the alias of undercover FBI agent Nicky Donatelli, portrayed by Romano Orzari.

=== Carmine "Pittsy" Gazzera ===
Carmine "Pittsy" Gazzera was one of Nicky Cavella's bodyguards/enforcers, always paired with Ink. He first appeared in The Punisher vol. 6 #2. Pittsy once worked as an enforcer for "Ray the Rat", then began serving Cavella when the latter became a soldier and scion of his family. Pittsy has an extremely high pain threshold and endurance, on a level comparable to the Punisher himself, and is a capable hand-to-hand combatant. During a three-way firefight between the Punisher, the CIA and Cavella's men, the Punisher throws Pittsy through a warehouse window and impales him on a spiked fence. Pittsy survives, but is shot and killed by the Punisher. Shortly after Pittsy's death, his younger sister Teresa replaces him as Cavella's bodyguard.

==== Pittsy in other media ====
Pittsy appears in Punisher: War Zone, portrayed by Mark Camacho. This version is Jigsaw's right hand and the father of Ink.

=== Robert Hellsgaard ===
First appeared in Punisher vol. 7 #11.

Robert Hellsgaard was a brilliant engineer in 1898 who came home to discover that his family was killed by werewolves. Ever since that day, he formed the Hunter of Monster Special Forces to exterminate monsters and has since resided in the armor he made. After exterminating Monster Isle, he and forces arrived in Monster Metropolis, where he ran afoul of Punisher's Frankencastle form and the Legion of Monsters.

=== Tiberiu Bulat ===
First appeared in The Punisher vol. 6 #26.

Cristu Bulat's father, with whom he fought in the Yugoslav Wars with the Serbs. They eventually went to the West, where they set up a series of brothels where East European abductees are forced into prostitution. He was burned alive by Castle, who had the murder recorded and sent to Bulat's associates in Moldova as a warning not to mess with the Punisher.

==== Tiberiu Bulat in other media ====
Tiberiu Bulat appears in Punisher: War Zone, portrayed by Aubert Pallascio. Upon learning his son Cristu was betrayed by Jigsaw and subsequently incarcerated, Tiberiu assists the Punisher in his crusade against Jigsaw.

=== Tony Pizzo ===
First appeared in The Punisher vol. 6 #19.

A young and inexperienced gangster who becomes a Mafia captain due to the Punisher killing most of New York City's veteran mafiosi. Pizzo first appears at a sit-down with Nicky Cavella and a few other captains; he and the other captains agree to make Cavella their boss so he can help them kill the Punisher and rebuild the Mafia. After an attempt to kill the Punisher fails miserably due to interference by CIA agent Kathryn O'Brien, Pizzo and the rest of the surviving Mafiosi turn on Cavella and leave him on his own for the Punisher to kill him. Pizzo appears several issues later in the "Widowmaker" story arc when one of the widows seduces him in order to find out about a Mafia convoy escorting a replacement boss into New York City; the Punisher finds out about this as well and attacks the convoy, killing everyone including Pizzo and the replacement boss.

=== Ray Schoonover ===
Colonel Ray Schoonover is a fictional character in Marvel Comics. The character, created by Carl Potts, John Wellington and Jim Lee, first appeared in The Punisher War Journal #4 (March 1988)

Schoonover was Frank Castle's former commanding officer during the Vietnam War. On the side, he was secretly running a drug smuggling ring. While running for U.S. Senate, he hired the Sniper to take out anyone who knew his secret. The Punisher found out and forced him to confess; Schoonover promptly committed suicide afterwards.

==== Ray Schoonover in other media ====
Ray Schoonover appears in Marvel's Netflix television series, portrayed by Clancy Brown:

- First appearing in the second season of Daredevil, this version is Frank Castle's former commanding officer in the U.S. Marines who secretly operates as a drug runner codenamed the "Blacksmith" and orchestrated a shootout between the Irish Mob and a gang called the Dogs of Hell that led to Frank's family's deaths. In the present, Schoonover serves as a character witness in Frank's trial before attempting to frame him for murdering individuals connected to the Castle family's deaths upon his release from prison. Additionally, his men attempt to kill Karen Page, who had been investigating and legally representing Frank in court, but he kills them and saves Page. Amidst an interview with Schoonover, Page deduces his criminal activities before Frank kidnaps and later kills him over Page's protests.
- Schoonover appears in flashbacks depicted in The Punisher episode "Kandahar". While working with the Marines, he and Frank served in an illegal black ops unit called Operation: Cerberus that was funded by heroin they were smuggling inside the corpses of soldiers who were killed-in-action. Additionally, Schoonover lost his right arm to a mortar blast after ignoring Frank's concerns about a mission leading into an ambush.

=== Stone Cold ===
Derek Smalls/Stone Cold is a fictional character in the Marvel Comics Universe, created by Steven Grant, Chuck Dixon and Hugh Haynes, first appeared in The Punisher: War Journal #76 (March 1995).

Derek Smalls was a former veteran S.H.I.E.L.D. agent selected for a process to take down this government agency monitoring called Vigilante Infraction General Interdiction and Limitation (VIGIL). VIGIL's task primarily located several vigilantes including the Punisher, Lynn Michaels and Microchip. Smalls now turned assassin for hire under the title "Stone Cold" activated the program and is the mercenary responsible for the deaths of ex-Marine Carlos Cruz and Punisher's former ally Microchip. Smalls was monitoring Punisher's fight with Bullseye at Coney Island, and was prepared to kill Castle. However Castle's old ally Shotgun murdered Stone Cold, as he was brought in by Nick Fury to retrieve the data from Smalls and save Castle.

=== Curtis Hoyle ===
Curtis Hoyle is a fictional character in the Marvel Comics Universe. He first appeared in The Punisher #1 (July 1987), and was created by writer Mike Baron and artist Klaus Janson.

A lieutenant in the Vietnam War, Hoyle fought alongside Frank Castle before returning home to the U.S. where they parted ways. Hoyle turned to a life of crime with the Rockhouse Corporation where he quickly rose in the ranks to be second in command. He reunited with Castle, who disguised himself, hoping to get close to Hoyle's boss. However, Hoyle saw through Castle's disguise and tried to kill the man. Hoyle was no match for Castle who threw him out of a helicopter to his death.

==== Curtis Hoyle in other media ====
Curtis Hoyle appears in The Punisher, portrayed by Jason R. Moore. Introduced in the first season, this version is a former US Navy Special Amphibious Reconnaissance Corpsman who lost his left leg to an IED, leading to him acquiring a prosthetic leg, and went on to become an insurance salesman as well as run a therapy group. Additionally, he stays in contact with Frank Castle after their service and is aware of the latter's activities as the Punisher, personally admitting that he would have helped him find the people who killed his family. Hoyle returned in The Punisher: One Last Kill television special.

=== William Rawlins ===
William Rawlins is a fictional character in the Marvel Comics Universe. He first appeared in The Punisher vol. 7 #13 (Nov. 2004), and was created by writer Garth Ennis and artist Douglas Braithwaite.

A CIA agent who set up a terrorist cell in Riyadh, Saudi Arabia on the orders of a rogue group of US Army and US Air Force generals, later used as a distraction while Frank Castle and a Delta Force operator infiltrated a Russian missile silo to retrieve a virus sample. He is also one of Kathryn O'Brien's ex-husbands, and on their honeymoon pushed Kathryn out of a helicopter into the hands of the terrorists to protect a shipment of heroin. Rawlins is later assigned by the generals to organize the death of Castle with Nicky Cavella, with whom he had an intimate relationship. He is later kidnapped by O'Brien and Castle, where he's tortured by Castle to find out information about the rogue generals, which is taped. During the torture session, Rawlins lost an eye. He later escapes and sells his information of the terrorist attack on Russia to the Russian military, since he has become persona non grata to the CIA and needed protection. He later betrays the Russians for his own ulterior gains. Before he is finally able to escape and disappear, Rawlins is murdered by Castle in the men's restroom of Kabul International Airport.

==== William Rawlins in other media ====
William J. "Bill" Rawlins III appears in the first season of The Punisher, portrayed by Paul Schulze. This version, also known as "Agent Orange", previously oversaw an illegally funded black ops unit called Operation Cerberus, of which Frank Castle took part in. After Rawlins ignored Frank's concerns about an ambush and getting caught in it, Frank punched Rawlins hard enough to cause an orbital blowout fracture, permanently blinding the latter in his left eye. In the present, Rawlins became the director of the CIA's covert operations unit and built a security network via illegal dealings and assassinations. However, he comes into conflict with Frank, who eventually kills Rawlins.

=== Mennonite ===
The Mennonite is a fictional character in the Marvel Comics Universe. He first appeared in Punisher MAX #3 (March 2010), and was created by writer Jason Aaron and artist Steve Dillon.

An unnamed farmer simply known as the Mennonite lived in a community of Amish farmers. His wife Mary was sick, and it did not look like Mary was getting better. Their two sons found a box full of dangerous weapons, and when the Mennonite caught them, he took the box and buried it by a tree in a field. Giving in to his faith, he prayed to God for some way to help his wife, only to get word from his sons that someone named Rigoletto was looking to hire him. Resigned, the Mennonite takes the box of weapons and heads on his way. He enters the city to meet with Rigoletto, to whom he refuses to divulge his "Christian name", and accepts the job of killing the Punisher though only with the tools that his religion allows. The Mennonite and the Punisher face off with the former using a hammer, horses, and his bare hands to take the latter on in a fight. Tiring out, the Mennonite reaches for one of the Punisher's guns, only to get electrified. The Punisher drops a safe on his head, killing him.

==== Mennonite in other media ====
A character loosely inspired by Mennonite named John Pilgrim appears in the second season of The Punisher, portrayed by Josh Stewart. This version, previously known as Robert, is a former white supremacist who was jailed for his reckless behavior. After being "saved" by company CEOs Anderson and Eliza Schultz, he converted to Christianity, became a pastor, removed his tattoos, and married a woman named Rebecca, with whom he had two sons named Michael and Lemuel. However, the Schultzes hire him to hunt down Amy Bendix, a young girl who stole perceived compromising photos of their senator son kissing a man. Pilgrim agrees and joins a group of mercenaries in locating her, only to encounter the Punisher. After meeting former Neo-Nazi colleagues and learning Rebecca had died from illness, a broken Pilgrim fights the Punisher, who defeats him and later kills the Schultzes. Upon being reunited with his sons, Pilgrim parts ways with the Punisher.
