= The Punisher (2004 series) =

Marvel MAX Comics series

- The Punisher #1 (March 2004), cover art by Tim Bradstreet.

Publication information
- Publisher: Marvel Comics
- Schedule: Monthly
- Format: Ongoing series
- Genre: Crime
- Publication date: March 2004–October 2009
- No. of issues: 75, plus 1 Annual
- Main character: The Punisher

Creative team
- Written by: Garth Ennis; Gregg Hurwitz; Duane Swierczynski; Victor Gischler
- Artist(s): Lewis Larosa; Leandro Fernández; Dougie Braithwaite; Goran Parlov; Lan Medina; Howard Chaykin; Laurence Campbell; Michel Lacombe

The Punisher (re-titled Frank Castle: The Punisher after issue #66; sometimes referred to as The Punisher MAX) was a comic book ongoing series published under the MAX imprint of Marvel Comics, featuring vigilante and antihero the Punisher. It ran from March 2004 through October 2009.

== Publication history ==
Garth Ennis, also writer of the 2000 and 2001 Punisher series, wrote issues #1–60 of the series. Also like the earlier series, Tim Bradstreet provided the covers for those issues. Continuing his run on the character, Ennis used the freedom of the MAX imprint to write more graphic and hard-edged stories than had previously been seen. Ennis also wrote two miniseries accompanying the main series, The Punisher Presents: Barracuda and Born, and several one-shots.

With issue #61, Gregg Hurwitz replaced Ennis as writer, joining artist Laurence Campbell to do a five-issue story arc. With issue #66 released on January 21, 2009, the series was re-titled Frank Castle: The Punisher, with writer Duane Swierczynski and artist Michel Lacombe coming to the series. Victor Gischler came on board for the storyline "Welcome to the Bayou" in issues #71–74 before the title finished with issue #75, a double-length issue with stories by Thomas Piccirilli, Gregg Hurwitz, Duane Swierczynski, Peter Milligan, and Charlie Huston.

The title was relaunched as Punisher MAX in 2010, with writer Jason Aaron and artist Steve Dillon.

== Differences from the mainstream Marvel Universe ==
The series explicitly does not use a floating timeline like the mainstream Marvel Universe, instead presenting a Punisher who ages in real time. Gravestones and other references indicate that his family was killed in 1976. The Punisher has been active for almost 30 years at the time presented in most stories, with issue #19 specifying that he has killed approximately 2,000 people. Born also establishes that the Punisher's service in the Vietnam War is still in MAX continuity.

Promotional art for the cover of Punisher #44 (March 2007), gives Frank's born as Queens, New York, 1947 but that was removed for the published issues. The story "Valley Forge, Valley Forge" corroborates this date, referring to Castle as "a twenty-one year old Captain" in April 1971.

Another major difference is the complete lack of superheroes and supervillains in the series, although non-superpowered characters from the Punisher's past, most notably Microchip, do make appearances. Nick Fury also makes several notable appearances, with his characterization echoing Ennis' MAX-imprint Fury stories. However, the character Jen Cooke, a social worker, appeared in the Marvel Knights storyline "Hidden". She then appeared in the MAX storyline "Slavers". The character Yorkie Mitchell made appearances in both the Marvel Knights and the MAX Punisher comics.

In the Civil War Files comic, just before the "Civil War" storyline was published, Iron Man talked about events in the Punisher's past from the Marvel Knights and MAX comics, which indicated that it did happen in the mainstream Marvel Universe at some point:

- "Captain Frank Castle, sole survivor of the Firebase Valley Forge massacre".
- "Although recently Castle has escalated his war on crime even further, with record-breaking body counts, he is paradoxically now rarely encountered in the field by any super hero save Daredevil".
- "It's almost like he inhabits two worlds, one where heroes can capture him and one where they can't, and he can slip from one to the other with ease".

Many characters are past or current intelligence and military operatives from governmental agencies like the American CIA, the Soviet KGB and the British SIS and SAS and militaries and militias from the Balkans, the Middle East and the IRA, all with agendas rooted in past conflicts like the Cold War or the Yugoslav Wars.

== Prints ==
=== Issues ===
No.	Story arc	Cover date	Comic Book Roundup rating	Estimated sales (first month)
#1	In the Beginning	March 2004	8.0 by one professional critic.	56,350, ranked 20th in North America.
#2	In the Beginning	March 2004		49,197, ranked 24th in North America.
#3	In the Beginning	April 2004		46,383, ranked 34th in North America.
#4	In the Beginning	May 2004		47,096, ranked 32nd in North America.
#5	In the Beginning	June 2004		34,236, ranked 57th in North America.
#6	In the Beginning	July 2004		48,533, ranked 31st in North America.
#7	Kitchen Irish	August 2004		48,126, ranked 30th in North America.
#8	Kitchen Irish	August 2004		47,477, ranked 31st in North America.
#9	Kitchen Irish	September 2004	6.0 by two professional critics.	46,885, ranked 30th in North America.
#10	Kitchen Irish	October 2004	8.0 by one professional critic.	45,397, ranked 33rd in North America.
#11	Kitchen Irish	November 2004		44,036, ranked 45th in North America.
#12	Kitchen Irish	December 2004		42,661, ranked 36th in North America.
#13	Mother Russia	January 2005		42,086, ranked 38th in North America.
#14	Mother Russia	January 2005		41,512, ranked 42nd in North America.
#15	Mother Russia	February 2005		40,359, ranked 37th in North America.
#16	Mother Russia	March 2005		39,262, ranked 35th in North America.
#17	Mother Russia	April 2005		38,732, ranked 42nd in North America.
#18	Mother Russia	May 2005		38,300, ranked 56th in North America.
#19	Up is Down and Black is White	June 2005		38,746, ranked 47th in North America.
#20	Up is Down and Black is White	June 2005		38,123, ranked 49th in North America.
#21	Up is Down and Black is White	July 2005		37,992, ranked 47th in North America.
#22	Up is Down and Black is White	August 2005		37,804, ranked 49th in North America.
#23	Up is Down and Black is White	September 2005		37,381, ranked 53rd in North America.
#24	Up is Down and Black is White	October 2005	9.0 by one professional critic.	37,019, ranked 65th in North America.
#25	The Slavers	November 2005		37,145, ranked 61st in North America.
#26	The Slavers	December 2005		36,427, ranked 50th in North America.
#27	The Slavers	January 2006		36,072, ranked 48th in North America.
#28	The Slavers	February 2006		35,535, ranked 55th in North America.
#29	The Slavers	March 2006		34,696, ranked 50th in North America.
#30	The Slavers	April 2006	9.0 by one professional critic.	34,281, ranked 57th in North America.
#31	Barracuda	May 2006		34,500, ranked 68th in North America.
#32	Barracuda	June 2006		34,076, ranked 60th in North America.
#33	Barracuda	July 2006		34,467, ranked 68th in North America.
#34	Barracuda	August 2006		34,162, ranked 65th in North America.
#35	Barracuda	September 2006		34,111, ranked 69th in North America.
#36	Barracuda	October 2006		34,162, ranked 68th in North America.
#37	Man of Stone	November 2006		34,246, ranked 59th in North America.
#38	Man of Stone	November 2006		33,835, ranked 61st in North America.
#39	Man of Stone	December 2006		33,947, ranked 52nd in North America.
#40	Man of Stone	January 2007		33,577, ranked 69th in North America.
#41	Man of Stone	January 2007		33,161, ranked 72nd in North America.
#42	Man of Stone	February 2007		33,001, ranked 63rd in North America.
#43	Widowmaker	March 2007	9.0 by one professional critic.	33,022, ranked 55th in North America.
#44	Widowmaker	April 2007	8.0 by one professional critic.	32,945, ranked 61st in North America.
#45	Widowmaker	May 2007	7.0 by one professional critic.	33,243, ranked 64th in North America.
#46	Widowmaker	June 2007	8.0 by one professional critic.	33,393, ranked 65th in North America.
#47	Widowmaker	July 2007	10 by one professional critic.	33,881, ranked 70th in North America.
#48	Widowmaker	August 2007	8.0 by one professional critic.	33,783, ranked 62nd in North America.
#49	Widowmaker	September 2007	8.0 by one professional critic.	34,305, ranked 73rd in North America.
#50	Long Cold Dark	October 2007	10 by one professional critic.	36,455, ranked 75th in North America.
#51	Long Cold Dark	December 2007	8.6 by two professional critics.	33,735, ranked 72nd in North America.
#52	Long Cold Dark	January 2008	7.8 by one professional critic.	32,897, ranked 65th in North America.
#53	Long Cold Dark	February 2008		31,753, ranked 78th in North America.
#54	Long Cold Dark	March 2008	9.5 by two professional critics.	31,628, ranked 68th in North America.
#55	Valley Forge, Valley Forge	May 2008	8.4 by two professional critics.	31,627, ranked 60th in North America.
#56	Valley Forge, Valley Forge	June 2008	8.6 by two professional critics.	30,789, ranked 65th in North America.
#57	Valley Forge, Valley Forge	July 2008	8.4 by one professional critic.	30,519, ranked 71st in North America.
#58	Valley Forge, Valley Forge	August 2008	8.5 by one professional critic.	29,791, ranked 70th in North America.
#59	Valley Forge, Valley Forge	September 2008	7.0 by one professional critic.	30,058, ranked 82nd in North America.
#60	Valley Forge, Valley Forge	October 2008	8.1 by three professional critics.	30,667, ranked 79th in North America.
#61	Girls in White Dresses	October 2008	6.2 by four professional critics.	28,358, ranked 87th in North America.
#62	Girls in White Dresses	November 2008	5.1 by two professional critics.	26,898, ranked 91st in North America.
#63	Girls in White Dresses	December 2008	6.3 by one professional critic.	25,930, ranked 106th in North America.
#64	Girls in White Dresses	January 2009	6.1 by one professional critic.	24,656, ranked 76th in North America.
#65	Girls in White Dresses	February 2009	6.8 by one professional critic.	23,878, ranked 113th in North America.

As of issue #66, the series was officially re-titled Frank Castle: The Punisher.

No.	Story arc	Cover date	Estimated sales (first month)
#66	Six Hours to Kill	March 2009	22,799, ranked 81st in North America.
#67	Six Hours to Kill	April 2009	22,263, ranked 85th in North Americe.
#68	Six Hours to Kill	May 2009	22,252, ranked 85th in North America.
#69	Six Hours to Kill	June 2009	21,841, ranked 112th in North America.
#70	Six Hours to Kill	July 2009	21,864, ranked 91st in North America.
#71	Welcome to the Bayou	August 2009	21,311, ranked 107th in North America.
#72	Welcome to the Bayou	September 2009	21,035, ranked 100th in North America.
#73	Welcome to the Bayou	October 2009	20,354, ranked 104th in North America.
#74	Welcome to the Bayou	November 2009	20,242, ranked 121st in North America.
#75	Dolls/Gateway/Ghoul/Father's Day/Smallest Bit of This	December 2009	22,197, ranked 95th in North America.

=== Collected editions ===
Trade paperbacks

Vol. #	Vol. title	Material collected	Writer	Artist	Publication date	ISBN
1	In the Beginning	The Punisher #1–6	Garth Ennis	Lewis Larosa	2004	978-0785113911
2	Kitchen Irish	The Punisher #7–12	Garth Ennis	Leandro Fernández	2004	978-0785115397
3	Mother Russia	The Punisher #13–18	Garth Ennis	Dougie Braithwaite	2005	978-0785116035
4	Up is Down and Black is White	The Punisher #19–24	Garth Ennis	Leandro Fernández	2005	978-0785117315
5	The Slavers	The Punisher #25–30	Garth Ennis	Leandro Fernández	2006	978-0785118992
6	Barracuda	The Punisher #31–36	Garth Ennis	Goran Parlov	2006	978-0785120230
7	Man of Stone	The Punisher #37–42	Garth Ennis	Leandro Fernández	2007	978-0785121657
8	Widowmaker	The Punisher #43–49	Garth Ennis	Lan Medina	2007	978-0785124542
9	Long Cold Dark	The Punisher #50–54	Garth Ennis	Howard Chaykin (#50); Goran Parlov (#51–54)	2008	978-0785128144
10	Valley Forge, Valley Forge	The Punisher #55–60	Garth Ennis	Goran Parlov	2008	978-0785127550
11	Girls in White Dresses	The Punisher #61–65	Gregg Hurwitz	Laurence Campbell	2009	978-0785125204
12	Six Hours to Kill	Frank Castle: The Punisher MAX #66–70	Duane Swierczynski	Michel Lacombe	2009	978-0785131823
13	Welcome to the Bayou	Frank Castle: The Punisher MAX #71–74	Victor Gischler	Goran Parlov	2009	978-0785133780

Hardcovers

Title	Material collected	Publication date	ISBN
Volume 1	The Punisher #1–12	2005	978-0785118404
Volume 2	The Punisher #13–24	2006	978-0785120223
Volume 3	The Punisher #25–36	2007	978-0785119814
Volume 4	The Punisher #37–49	2007	978-0785114178
Volume 5	The Punisher #50–60	2009	978-0785137825
Volume 6	The Punisher #61–65; Frank Castle: The Punisher MAX #66–75	2011	978-0785156567

Complete Collections

Title	Vol. #	Material collected	Publication date	ISBN
The Punisher MAX: Complete Collection	1	Born #1–4; The Punisher #1–12	February 2016	978-1302900151
The Punisher MAX: Complete Collection	2	The Punisher #13–30	April 2016	978-1302900168
The Punisher MAX: Complete Collection	3	The Punisher #31–49	October 2016	978-1302901875
The Punisher MAX: Complete Collection	4	The Punisher Presents: Barracuda MAX #1–5; The Punisher #50–60; Punisher: The Tyger #1; Punisher: The Cell #1; Punisher: The End #1	December 2016	978-1302902445
The Punisher MAX: Complete Collection	5	Punisher MAX Annual #1; The Punisher: Force of Nature #1; Punisher MAX Special: Little Black Book #1 The Punisher #61–65; Frank Castle: The Punisher MAX #66–75	February 2017	978-1302902742
The Punisher MAX: Complete Collection	6	Punisher MAX X-Mas Special #1; Punisher MAX: Naked Kill; Punisher MAX: Get Castle; Punisher MAX: Butterfly #1; Punisher MAX: Happy Ending #1; Punisher MAX: Hot Rods of Death; Punisher MAX: Tiny Ugly World #1; Untold Tales of Punisher MAX #1–5	August 2017	978-1302907396

Omnibus

Title	Vol. #	Material collected	Publication date	ISBN
The Punisher MAX by Garth Ennis Omnibus	1	Born #1–4; The Punisher #1–30	May 2018	978-1302912079
The Punisher MAX by Garth Ennis Omnibus	2	The Punisher #31–60; The Punisher Presents: Barracuda MAX #1–5; Punisher: The Tyger #1; Punisher: The Cell #1; Punisher: The End #1	August 2018	978-1302912062

== Reception ==
The series holds an average rating of 7.9 by 38 professional critics on the review aggregation website Comic Book Roundup.

== In other media ==
=== Film ===
- The 2008 movie Punisher: War Zone starring Ray Stevenson is inspired by Punisher MAX, most notably incorporating characters from that series such as Gaitano Cesare, Carmine "Pittsy" Gazzerra, Ink, Cristu Bulat, Tiberiu Bulat and Maginty. The scene where Frank Castle/The Punisher kills Gaitano Cesare and the other mobsters is also taken directly from the storyline "In the Beginning", albeit cutting the head off the former instead of a headshot.

=== Television ===
- The second season of Daredevil loosely adapts the "Kitchen Irish" story arc, while adding in the titular character into the story alongside Frank Castle/the Punisher (portrayed by Jon Bernthal).
- The first season of The Punisher has William Rawlins as its main antagonist, a character who first appeared in issue #14.
