= Barracuda (Marvel Comics) =

- Barracuda in The Punisher vol. 7, #50 (October 2007); Art by Howard Chaykin.

Publication information
- Publisher: Marvel Comics
- First appearance: The Punisher vol. 7, #31 (May 2006); Earth-616 version: The Punisher: Red Band #4 (December 2025; cameo appearance)
- Created by: Garth Ennis (writer); Goran Parlov (artist); Earth-616 version: Benjamin Percy (writer); Julius Ohta (artist)

In-story information
- Alter ego: Unknown
- Species: Human
- Abilities: Highly trained armed/unarmed combatant; Knowledge in medicine and field surgery; Highly trained in combat swimming; Skilled hand-to-hand combatant; Expert marksman; Equipments include bulletproof vests, military explosive weaponry, assault weaponry, hand knives, and a machete.

Altered in-story information for adaptations to other media
- Partnerships: Ma Gnucci

Barracuda is a supervillain appearing in American comic books published by Marvel Comics. He is an enemy of the Punisher. Created by Garth Ennis and Goran Parlov for the Marvel Max alternate continuity, the character first appeared in The Punisher vol. 7 #31 (May 2006). Barracuda is depicted as a cheerfully optimistic and sadistic mercenary and gangster of great physical strength and endurance who commits various atrocities such as rape, mass murder, kidnapping and cannibalism.

== Publication history ==
The character made his first appearance in The Punisher vol. 7 #31 (May 2006), and was created by Garth Ennis and Goran Parlov.

In a panel at the 2008 Philadelphia Wizard World comic book convention, Garth Ennis stated that the basis for Barracuda was Stagger Lee, a folk song about "a large terrifying man and the terrifying things he does to people".

Barracuda was introduced in a story-arc that lasted from The Punisher vol. 7 #31 to #36. This was to be the character's sole appearance, though at the urging of his editor, Ennis had Barracuda survive the story; this led to Barracuda starring in the five-issue miniseries The Punisher Presents: Barracuda, then being killed off in a storyline that spanned The Punisher vol. 7 #50-54. Barracuda was then featured, via flashbacks to his time in South America in the 1980s, in Fury: MAX #10-12. He was then introduced to the mainstream Marvel Universe in The Punisher: Red Band #4 (December 2025) by Benjamin Percy and Julius Ohta.

== Fictional character biography ==
Barracuda was born to an African-American father and biracial mother of black, French and Irish descent in Boynton Beach, Florida, and grew up in Boca Raton as the eldest sibling to a brother and a sister. His father, an abusive alcoholic, abandoned his family, leaving Barracuda to care for his siblings. At some point, his brother died and his sister became a sex worker and drug addict.

After castrating a would-be attacker while in a youth detention center, Barracuda enlisted in the U.S. Army in 1975. As a Green Beret, Barracuda's A-team helped the CIA install Leopoldo Luna, a South American dictator in the 1980s. He was also responsible for drug-running in Nicaragua to fund the Contras and committed atrocities against local villages to ensure no resistance; when Colonel Nick Fury investigated, Barracuda humiliated him by making it clear that the CIA and Congress would bury any report, as it implicated too many people. The team went AWOL in Central America after that, though Fury was able to find and attack him five years later. After leaving the military, Barracuda became a feared gangster.

=== Fighting the Punisher ===
Harry Ebbing hires Barracuda to assassinate the Punisher, who is investigating Ebbing's corporation Dynaco. Ebbing plans to sabotage Florida's power grid for profit. The Punisher wishes to stop this plan because it would result in the deaths of many innocent people.

During his fight with the Punisher, Barracuda loses an eye and the fingers on his right hand. Although Barracuda wins the fight and could easily kill his opponent then and there, he takes the Punisher out to sea so he can watch him be killed by sharks. He tosses the Punisher overboard, along with Horace, a local gangster who had wronged him. The Punisher survives an ensuing great white shark encounter, and escapes by hanging onto Barracuda's boat.

Barracuda becomes deeply involved with Dynaco and the affairs of the CEO's wife and his right-hand man Dermot Leary. The plan is to set Leary up as the new CEO during a shareholder fishing trip. Dynaco's plans, leaked to the media, as well as confirmation of Dermot's betrayal, result in the CEO committing suicide. Leary ends up talking with the Punisher over the radio, who had pursued them with Barracuda's own boat. With the full backing of the shareholders, Leary declares they can do what they want as a corporation; the Punisher cannot touch them.

However, once Barracuda reveals that he rearmed Frank's disarmed explosives, the Punisher sinks their boat in response; everyone on board is eaten by sharks (including the crew, who were complicit Dynaco employees). Barracuda tries to come aboard his own boat, only to be shot back into the water at point-blank range by Frank. It is assumed he died, but it is later revealed that he survived by hanging onto his boat.

=== Miniseries ===
An undetermined amount of time later, Barracuda is approached by Chris Angelone, an Italian Mafia boss, to kill his rival Leopoldo Luna, leader of Santa Morricone. Barracuda announces to Luna's inner circle that he intends to kill Luna and Angelone, restart the cocaine trade between the two factions, and start up work in Santa Morricone. One of the circle reveals this plan to Luna and he invites Barracuda and Fifty on a helicopter trip to a volcano, planning to kill them. Barracuda convinces his friend Fifty to expose his penis, causing Luna to leap out of the helicopter to his death. Angelone, angry at being betrayed and humiliated, sways part of Santa Morricone's army to his side, only to be killed by his son Oswald.

=== Long Cold Dark ===
While formulating a plan to get his revenge on the Punisher, Barracuda learns that the Punisher has a young daughter, Sarah, from a deal between him and now-deceased CIA agent Kathryn O'Brien. Barracuda kidnaps Sarah and captures the Punisher. An enraged Punisher breaks his bonds and attacks Barracuda, biting off his left cheek. Barracuda stabs the Punisher in the side and tosses him through the window. The Punisher lands on the hood of a police car and is arrested and hospitalized as Barracuda escapes with Sarah. The Punisher tracks down Barracuda and kills him with his own gun.

== Powers and abilities ==
Barracuda has been trained by the U.S. Army Special Forces. He is a trained armed and unarmed combatant. He is a trained hand-to-hand combatant and is trained in swimming combat. Barracuda is a trained sniper and infantryman. He also has extensive knowledge in medicine and field surgery.

Additionally, Barracuda's equipment include bulletproof vests, military explosive weaponry, such as C-4, grenades, and land mines, assault weaponry like handguns and machine guns, hood knives, and a machete.

== Reception ==
=== Critical reception ===
Devin Friend of Screen Rant asserted, "Far and away the most popular villain from the Punisher MAX comics, Barracuda has become one of the most iconic enemies that Frank Castle has faced. A giant of a man whose massive stature is almost as terrifying as his evil heart, he is one of The Punisher's few opponents who survived to fight multiple times." Grant DeArmitt of CBR.com ranked Barracuda 3rd in their "Punisher Villains Ranked: The 10 Worst Frank Castle Ever Faced" list.

== Other characters named Barracuda ==
A character named Barracuda appeared as a member of Heavy Mettle. During the Dark Reign storyline, Norman Osborn recruits Barracuda and Heavy Mettle to join the Shadow Initiative.

== Other versions ==
The Punisher series Barracuda debuted in is set outside the eponymous character's primary continuity, taking place in a parallel universe known as Earth-200111.

=== Eminem/The Punisher ===
Barracuda is hired by the Parents Music Resource Center to assassinate Eminem, whom he was childhood friends with. He captures both Eminem and the Punisher, but is killed when the former escapes, acquires a chainsaw, and butchers him with it.

=== Marvel Noir ===
In Punisher Noir, Barracuda is a Prohibition-era enforcer of Bumpy Johnson, specializing in wrecking nightclubs rivaling those of his employer. He, Jigsaw, and the Russian are hired to kill Frank Castelione, a grocer who had defied mob boss Dutch Schultz. Years later, Barracuda is attacked by Frank's son, the Punisher, while on a date at Coney Island. The Punisher subdues Barracuda by blowing up a ferris wheel, ties him to another ride, and tries to threaten him into revealing who helped him and Jigsaw kill Frank. Barracuda refuses to divulge any information, and dies laughing when the Punisher activates the ride he is attached to, which rips Barracuda in half.

=== Marvel Universe ===
A version of Barracuda was going to appear in the regular Earth-616 Marvel Universe in the Punisher Vs. Barracuda miniseries by Ed Brisson. Originally intended to be released in 2020, the series went unpublished. Subsequently, Barracuda made his Earth-616 debut via a cameo appearance in The Punisher: Red Band by Benjamin Percy and Julius Ohta, settting up an eventual confrontation with the main continuity Punisher.

=== Space: Punisher ===
In Space: Punisher, Barracuda is an aquatic alien and a drug dealer with ties to the Six-Fingered Hand.

== In other media ==
- According to Ray Stevenson and Lionsgate, Barracuda would have appeared in a sequel to Punisher: War Zone.
- Barracuda appears as a playable character in The Punisher: No Mercy.
- Barry, a character inspired by Barracuda, appears in The Punisher: One Last Kill, portrayed by Jamal Lloyd Johnson.
