= Bushwacker (comics) =

Marvel Comics fictional character

Carl Burbank Bushwacker
- Bushwacker as depicted in Punisher vol. 14 #2. (December 2023). Art by Rod Reis.

Publication information
- Publisher: Marvel Comics
- First appearance: Daredevil #248 (November 1987)
- Created by: Ann Nocenti (writer); Rick Leonardi (artist)

In-story information
- Alter ego: Carl Burbank
- Species: Human mutant
- Team affiliations: Assassins Guild
- Abilities: Ability to reshape cybernetic arms into various ballistic/melee weapons and a flamethrower; Familiarity with the workings of international intelligence agencies and their methods; Trained assassin, hand-to-hand combatant, and infiltrator; Regenerative healing factor

Bushwacker (Carl Burbank) is a supervillain appearing in American comic books published by Marvel Comics. Created by writer Ann Nocenti and artist Rick Leonardi, the character first appeared in Daredevil #248 (November 1987). He is a recurring antagonist of the superhero Daredevil and has also encountered Punisher, Wolverine, and Carnage.

Once a priest, he renounced his vows after a series of deaths in his parish and became an assassin for the CIA. Equipped with cybernetic, weaponized arms, he later took on contracts from major crime figures such as Kingpin and the Hood. Burbank is also a mutant, a subspecies of humans born with superhuman abilities.

== Publication history ==
Bushwacker first appeared in Daredevil #248 (November 1987), and was created by Ann Nocenti and Rick Leonardi. He appeared in the 2005 Daredevil vs. Punisher series, and the 2018 The Immortal Hulk series.

== Fictional character biography ==
Carl Burbank was a priest who abandoned his vows following the drug-related deaths of young parishioners. He joined the C.I.A., which outfitted him with a cybernetic arm and made him an assassin under the codename "Bushwacker", but ultimately he became a freelancer.

At some point, an event took place that compelled Bushwacker to begin a war against all mutants. Bushwacker began hunting and assassinating mutants, most often those mutants whose abilities Bushwacker perceived as making them especially talented in "the arts". Bushwacker also claimed that he was paid large sums of money to kill mutants, but this has yet to be verified.

Entering the Kingpin's employ, Bushwacker attacks the Punisher, but is left for dead. It is during this time that his wife leaves him, believing him to be insane. Bushwacker reappears in the employ of drug lord Nick Lambert, who hires Bushwacker to kill reporter Ben Urich, who is about to run a story of his illegal activities. When Bushwacker learns the truth, he allows Urich to live and complete the exposé.

Imprisoned in the super-villain holding facility the Raft, Bushwacker escapes prison during a mass breakout triggered by Electro. Burbank is subsequently employed by the Jackal to kill the Punisher, but is defeated once again by Daredevil. Following this, Bushwacker works with G. W. Bridge to lure the Punisher out of hiding, intending to kill him. Bushwacker is defeated by Bridge and put back in jail.

During a 2019 storyline in The Immortal Hulk, Bushwacker appeared to be killed when Hulk explodes after being bathed in gamma radiation. Bushwacker is later revealed to have survived, but is killed by Eddie Brock.

== Powers and abilities ==
Carl Burbank was bionically modified by the CIA, transforming him into a cyborg. Although he appears fully human, his body is coated with a flesh-like substance that can liquefy to seal wounds, making him resistant to gunfire and able to conceal scars. He can morph his arms into various weapons, including a rifle, handgun, assault rifle, buzzsaw, and flamethrower, and has even fired cyanide capsules. Bushwacker sometimes consumes ammunition to fuel his weapon, occasionally seen ingesting gasoline or bullets, though at other times, he appears to have an unlimited supply. Bushwacker has claimed to be a mutant, making him one of the mutants he despises.

Bushwacker was trained in CIA hand-to-hand combat techniques, and is trained in infiltration and assassination. He also has familiarity with the workings of international intelligence agencies and their methods.

== Other versions ==
An alternate version of Carl Burbank appears in House of M: Masters of Evil.

== In other media ==
=== Video games ===
- Bushwacker appears as a boss in The Punisher (1993). This version serves as a servant of the Kingpin.
- Bushwacker appears in The Punisher (2005), voiced by Phil Hayes. This version works for the Gnucci family.
- Bushwacker appears as a playable character in The Punisher: No Mercy.

=== Miscellaneous ===
In 2024, Hasbro released an action figure of Bushwacker as part of the Marvel Legends action figure line.
