= The Punisher: No Mercy =

2009 video game

- Developer: Zen Studios
- Publisher: Sony Computer Entertainment
- Series: The Punisher
- Engine: Unreal Engine 3
- Platform: PlayStation 3
- Release: July 2, 2009
- Genre: First-person shooter
- Mode: Multiplayer

The Punisher: No Mercy is a first-person shooter video game that was released on July 2, 2009, on the PSN Store. The game was pulled from PSN as of 2011 due to licensing expiring between Marvel and Zen Studios, although Marvel continued working with Zen Studios on Marvel Pinball.

== Gameplay ==
The game is an arena-based first-person shooter, with four arenas available at launch including New York, Docks and Factories. The player is able to carry three weapons at a time to convey a sense of realism. The story mode consists of four matches played on different maps with different game types. Before playing, players are required to select a mode which will advantage the player. The game includes local multiplayer and online play, which contains deathmatch, one vs many and co-op. The player is not able to drive vehicles. There is a total of eight playable characters, each with their own unique abilities. The single-player game mode includes story scenes featuring original artwork by Mike Deodato.

== Plot ==
Acting on a tip provided by his ally Budianski, the Punisher stakes out the New York City docks, where Barracuda and Bushwacker are overseeing the importation of goods smuggled out of Symkaria. The Punisher attacks the villains, and receives unexpected backup from Silver Sable, who flees once all of the criminals, save Barracuda, have been killed. The wounded Barracuda admits to working for Jigsaw, and is then shot in the head by the dead Bushwacker's malfunctioning bio-gun.

Following a clue left by Jigsaw, the Punisher is led to Finn Cooley, who injects him with a Symkarian drug. The Punisher breaks Cooley's neck, and is confronted by a mob of homeless people (hired, drugged, and armed by Jigsaw) who he hallucinates are past enemies and allies, such as Microchip and Jenny Cesare. The Punisher massacres the vagrants, and is snapped back to reality by Silver Sable, who leaves him to continue his mission on his own, while mentioning that she is "meeting up with some friends tonight".

The Punisher locates Jigsaw's lair, which is full of Jigsaw doubles. The Punisher slaughters the impostors, and is subdued by the real Jigsaw. As Jigsaw taunts and prepares to kill the Punisher, the building is rocked by an explosion, which distracts Jigsaw, giving the Punisher the chance to stab him in the head. The source of the blast is revealed to be Silver Sable, who orders the Punisher to surrender while holding him at gunpoint with a S.H.I.E.L.D. team that includes Nick Fury, Dum Dum Dugan, Outlaw, and Black Widow. The game ends as the screen flashes, "To Be Continued..."

== Characters ==
Playable

- The Punisher
- Barracuda
- Bushwacker
- Jigsaw
- Silver Sable
- Microchip
- Finn Cooley
- Jenny Cesare
- Carlos Cruz (DLC)

Non-Playable

- S.H.I.E.L.D.
  - Dum Dum Dugan
  - Black Widow
  - Nick Fury
  - Outlaw

== Reception ==
Reception

Aggregate scores
| Aggregator | Score |
|---|---|
| GameRankings | 49.19% |
| Metacritic | 47/100 |

Review scores
| Publication | Score |
|---|---|
| 1Up.com | C− |
| Destructoid | 3/10 |
| Edge | 3/10 |
| GameSpot | 4.5/10 |
| GamesRadar+ | 2/5 |
| GameZone | 5.7/10 |
| IGN | 4.2/10 |

The game holds an aggregated rating of 47 out of 100 at Metacritic, and 49.19% at GameRankings.

GameSpot gave the game a score of 4.5 out of 10, criticizing its short length and difficulty of unlocking. IGN gave it 4.2 out of 10, concluding, "The Punisher: No Mercy is a pretty bad game all around. (...) There's just not really anything to like here, unfortunately". PlayStation Official Magazine UK, however, gave the game 7 out of 10, stating, "it's definitely playable, and a respectable value at a penny under seven quid".

== See also ==
- Marvel Games
