= Ma Gnucci =

- Ma Gnucci on the cover of Punisher War Zone Vol. 2 #5 (March 2009); Art by Steve Dillon

Publication information
- Publisher: Marvel Comics
- First appearance: The Punisher Vol. 5, #4 (July 2000)
- Created by: Garth Ennis (writer); Steve Dillon (artist)

In-story information
- Full name: Isabella Carmela Magdalena Gnucci
- Species: Human
- Team affiliations: Gnucci Crime Family

Isabella Carmela Magdalena "Ma" Gnucci is a supervillain appearing in American comic books published by Marvel Comics. She is the matriarch of the Gnucci crime family and an enemy of the Punisher.

Ma Gnucci appeared in the Marvel Cinematic Universe TV special The Punisher: One Last Kill, portrayed by Judith Light.

== Publication history ==
Created by Garth Ennis and Steve Dillon, the character made her first appearance in The Punisher Vol. 5, #4 (July 2000).

Ma was mentioned and heard (through devices such as telephones and intercoms) in the first three issues of The Punisher Vol. 5, and appeared in person in Issue #4; the character was present in the eight subsequent installment of the volume, and also played a part in the events of Deadpool Vol. 1, #54-55, and Punisher War Zone Vol. 2, #1-6.

Gnucci appeared in entries in Marvel Encyclopedia #5, All-New Official Handbook of the Marvel Universe #4, and Official Handbook of the Marvel Universe A-Z #4.

== Fictional character biography ==
When the Punisher resumes his war on crime in New York City, he announces his return by killing the three sons of Isabella "Ma" Gnucci, the head of New York's largest remaining Mafia family. Ma uses her influence and connections to have the NYPD create a "Punisher Task Force" (which, unbeknownst to Ma, is a sinecure consisting of only two people) while also having her consigliere hire three assassins to eliminate Punisher, who kills them, and then kills the consigliere. The Punisher follows this up by murdering Ma's brother and underboss Dino with a sniper rifle.

While tracking Ma and her bodyguards, the Punisher is spotted and chased into the Central Park Zoo, where he releases the captive animals as a distraction. Ma loses her scalp and the use of all four of her limbs to a group of polar bears, but survives. Ten days after being mauled, Ma offers a reward of ten million dollars to anyone who can kill the Punisher. This leads to one of the Punisher's neighbors tipping Ma off to the vigilante's whereabouts, which prompts Ma to send the entire Gnucci family to kill him. The Punisher guns down the mobsters, but sustains injuries during the battle that leave him temporarily incapacitated.

With the Punisher weakened, Ma hires the Russian, a near-superhuman mercenary, to finish him off. The Punisher slays the Russian, drives to Ma's mansion, and intimidates her few remaining men into surrendering by showing them the Russian's severed head. The Punisher then sets Ma's mansion ablaze, killing her.

Ma Gnucci reappears nine years after her death, claiming to have escaped from Hell with the intention of uniting New York's underworld against the Punisher. In actuality, Ma's "resurrection" is a hoax orchestrated by the Elite, a criminal mastermind who has quadriplegic women surgically altered to mimic Ma's injuries so he can use her reputation to rise to power. When his plans fall apart, the Elite has all of the women he hired murdered to cover his tracks. The Punisher later finds and kills him and his associates.

== Relatives ==
The following are the known relatives of Ma Gnucci:

- Bobby Gnucci - Ma Gnucci's son and a date rapist. When Eddie was killed by Punisher, Bobby went down to the morgue to identify his body. While there, he encountered Punisher who killed him after a short gun battle.
- Carlo Gnucci - Ma Gnucci's number one son. Punisher tracked Carlo Gnucci down to a local hotel, grabbed him, and threw him off the roof of the hotel.
- Cousin Stevie - Ma Gnucci's cousin. After Ma Gnuuci ended up a quadriplegic amputee, Cousin Stevie asked if she was alright. Ma Gnucci was angered at this and ordered her henchman Joey to kill him.
- Dino Gnucci - Ma Gnucci's brother who was a wanted criminal for acts of multiple homicide which he did not commit. Matt Murdock was his lawyer in court. Dino was eventually killed by Punisher despite Daredevil's interference.
- Marco "Architect" Gnucci - The husband of Ma Gnucci. Marco Gnucci was thought to have been killed by her, but he actually survived and has been operating as a judge named Anthony Medhichi where he secretly continues his life of crime. Punisher did not know about him until he learned about Marco from Daredevil.
- Peter Gnucci - Ma Gnucci's nephew. Peter realizes that he stands to inherit Ma's money if the Punisher dies. He hires Deadpool to assassinate the Punisher. When it is falsely assumed the Punisher is dead, Peter acquires his money in the form of a check. He loses it in traffic. By the time he realizes he can ask the bank for a new one, it is too late. A truck bounces him out of the road impaling him on the Wall Street Bull statue.
- "Sticky Eddie" Gnucci - Ma Gnucci's son who was a drug dealer/drug user who overdosed his business rivals to watch them choke on their own blood. The building he was in was blown up by Punisher.
- Tony Gnucci - a member of the Gnucci Crime Family.

== In other media ==
- Ma Gnucci appears in Volition's 2005 third-person shooter video game The Punisher, voiced by Saffron Henderson.
- Ma Gnucci appears in the 2026 Marvel Cinematic Universe television special The Punisher: One Last Kill, portrayed by Judith Light. This version is not disfigured, and seeks revenge against Frank Castle, who killed her husband Benny and three sons, who were in turn some of the parties responsible for the murder of Castle's family. She has difficulty walking and is assisted by her bodyguard, Barry.
