= Punisher: The Platoon =

2017 Marvel Comics limited series

- Cover of Punisher: The Platoon #1

Publication information
- Publisher: Marvel Comics
- Schedule: Weekly
- Format: Limited series
- Genre: War
- Publication date: 2017
- No. of issues: 6
- Main character: Punisher

Creative team
- Created by: Garth Ennis
- Written by: Garth Ennis
- Artist(s): Goran Parlov; Jordie Bellaire
- Penciller: Goran Parlov
- Inker: Goran Parlov
- Letterer: Rob Steen
- Colorist: Jordie Bellaire
- Editor(s): Axel Alonso; Nicholas Albert 'Nick' Lowe; Kathleen Wisneski

Punisher: The Platoon is a 2017 war comic book limited series published by Marvel Comics under the MAX imprint, the series centered around the character of Frank Castle during his first tour in the Vietnam War as a young man. It is written by Garth Ennis who has previously worked extensively on the character of Frank Castle (the Punisher), under the Punisher Max line and in mainstream Marvel comics.

== Development ==
The series serves as a prequel to Ennis' earlier series Born.

== Publication history ==
The first issue of the series was published with three variants; one with a cover by Andre Brase, another with a Marco Checchetto cover and the final being a "How-to-Draw Variant". The second issue received a variant cover by Scott Hepburn and Ian Herring.

== Plot ==
The series focuses on Frank Castle as a young man during his first tour in Vietnam, with a framing narrative of both American soldiers in Castle's platoon and an NVA General being interviewed in the modern day. As the interview goes on, Frank's mindset emerges as the forerunner of later Punisher way to fight crime; his own men, now older, recognize that. During the tour, Castle antagonizes a young Vietcong girl, who sets out to take revenge on him, almost succeeding.

== Reception ==
The series holds an average rating of 8.4 by sixteen professional critics according to review aggregation website Comic Book Roundup.

== Prints ==
=== Issues ===
| Issue | Title | Cover date | Comic Book Roundup rating | Estimated sales (first month) |
|---|---|---|---|---|
| #1 | 1: Crack the Sky and Shake the Earth | December 2017 | 7.8 by six professional critics. | 32,837, ranked 73rd in North America |
| #2 | 2: Ma Deuce | December 2017 | 8.5 by one professional critic. | 25,587, ranked 100th in North America |
| #3 | 3: The Black Rifles | January 2018 | 8.0 by two professional critics. | 21,441, ranked 106th in North America |
| #4 | 4: Absolute Consequences | February 2018 | 9.0 by one professional critic. | 21,103, ranked 101st in North America |
| #5 | 5: Deadfall | | 7.8 by three professional critics. | 20,480, ranked 108th in North America |
| #6 | 6: Happy Childhoods | | 9.5 by three professional critic. | 20,378, ranked 109th in North America |

=== Collected editions ===
| Title [Tagline] | Format | Material collected | Pages | Publication date | ISBN | Estimated sales (North America) [Trades] | Rated |
|---|---|---|---|---|---|---|---|
| Punisher: The Platoon | Trade paperback (TPB) | Punisher: The Platoon #1-6 | 136 | April 18, 2018 | 978-0-7851-9018-9 | 3,149, ranked 16th in North America | EC (Note: Explicit Content) |
