= Born (comics) =

2003 Marvel comic book series

- Born #1 (August 2003); Art by Wiesław Wałkuski

Publication information
- Publisher: Marvel Comics
- Schedule: Monthly
- Format: Limited series
- Genre: War
- Publication date: August - November 2003
- No. of issues: 4
- Main character(s): Frank Castle; Stevie Goodwin

Creative team
- Created by: Garth Ennis; Darick Robertson
- Written by: Garth Ennis
- Penciller(s): Darick Robertson
- Inker(s): Tom Palmer
- Letterer(s): Virtual Calligraphy's Rus Wooton
- Colorist(s): Paul Mounts
- Editor(s): Joe Quesada

Collected editions
- Hardcover: ISBN 978-0785112310

Born is a four-issue comic book limited series written by Garth Ennis, illustrated by Darick Robertson, and published by Marvel Comics through the adult-oriented MAX imprint in 2003.

== Publication history ==
The miniseries was released through Marvel's MAX imprint, though the events of it are regarded as canon to the main Marvel Universe in Civil War Files, an in-universe spin-off of the Official Handbook of the Marvel Universe in which Iron Man notes that the Punisher is "the sole survivor of the Firebase Valley Forge massacre."

Ennis announced in 2013 that he would be writing another Punisher limited series, and two years later expanded on this statement by revealing that the miniseries would be a Born prequel titled Punisher: The Platoon.

== Plot ==
Born documents Frank Castle's time serving as a captain in the United States Marine Corps during his final tour in Vietnam in 1971. The story is told primarily through the eyes of Stevie Goodwin, a young Marine counting down the days of his service and Frank Castle, a tough Captain with a finely honed killer instinct and survival skills who is described as being "in love with war". The story chronicles a crucial 4-day period of the platoon stationed at Firebase Valley Forge, a remote strategic outpost on the South Vietnamese-Cambodian border.

Valley Forge is an outpost on its last legs; half of its Marines are addicted to heroin and its commanding officer is an apathetic alcoholic who pretends to have malaria whenever someone comes to inspect the base. Goodwin simply wishes to return home safely, and realizes that sticking close to Castle is his best option. Castle, despite being at home in the jungle, maintains an internal dialogue with a voice that continually goads Castle into justifying his endless thirst for combat. Castle receives news that Valley Forge will be abandoned, amidst increasing opposition to the war on the home front. Castle is displayed as exceptionally ruthless; first he tricks a visiting general into wandering into sniper fire for threatening to close down the base, then he drowns a member of his platoon who raped a female Vietcong sniper. Castle himself killed the sniper while she was being assaulted. Another character grimly reflects that his action was the only way she could have been "helped", as she would have never survived captivity.

Despite the news that the Firebase will soon be closed, Castle continues leading a squad on routine patrols, though his men are thinned by sporadic ambushes by the Vietcong. By the fourth day, the attrition has left the outpost severely undermanned and outgunned. When night falls, bringing a hellish downpour, the Viet Cong and elements of the North Vietnamese Army attack the fortification, using the rain to shield themselves from air cover.

One by one, Castle's unit drops, and he finds himself surrounded and running out of ammunition for a gun about to burn out from overuse. The voice in his head becomes louder and louder until it can be heard over the scream of the storm and roar of the gunshots. It offers Castle the strength and stamina needed to survive, to maintain an eternal state of vigilance, and to wage a permanent war - at a price. Castle finally gives in.

By the next morning, the air support has returned with an EVAC helicopter to the destroyed encampment, but are horrified to find Castle standing alone in a field of mutilated and broken VC bodies. He has suffered severe physical trauma and is bleeding from several gunshot wounds, but remains unaffected.

In the next scene, Frank Castle returns home, a decorated officer on a crutch, to his waiting wife, Maria and children. In the midst of the smiling return, the internal voice speaks again of the price of Castle's choice. It is exactly what Castle's eternal war will cost him, as a picture details Castle's family in a sighting reticle reminiscent of the Punisher's skull icon. The voice goes on to say that it and Castle are in the same business though it has been at it for much longer and that Castle will keep it busy which implies that the voice could be the Devil or Death itself. Horrified, Castle embraces his smiling wife and eager children.

Regarding the ambiguous conclusion to the story, writer Garth Ennis noted:

To me, that whole sequence was about – it's written in that classic way where maybe it's there, maybe it's all in his head. It's more a man coming to terms with his own fate, his own destiny, and the path he'll walk through the world. A man being honest with himself about who he is. At home he has the wife, the kid, the other kid on the way, meanwhile he's up to his neck in horror. He likes it, and he's coming to terms with that and admitting it. Ultimately, it's his ability to embrace this that allows him to survive and come home to his wife and kids. He's made a kind of deal with the attraction to the violence in himself that will, in a way, draw his family into that world too. Again, you can read it anyway you want, but that's my own personal take!

== Issues ==
1. "The First Day"
2. "The Second Day"
3. "The Third Day"
4. "The Last Day"

== Other media ==
- The 2005 Punisher video game uses artwork taken from Born in-game in order to illustrate flashback sequences triggered by the Punisher's use of torture against enemy NPCs.
