= The Punisher War Zone =

Comic book featuring Punisher

- Cover to the 1992 debut issue by John Romita Jr.

Publication information
- Publisher: Marvel Comics
- Schedule: Monthly
- Format: vol. 1 Ongoing vol. 2 Limited vol. 3 Limited
- Genre: Crime
- Publication date: vol. 1 March 1992 – July 1995 vol. 2 February – March 2009 vol. 3 December 2012 – April 2013
- No. of issues: vol. 1; 41 plus 2 Annuals vol. 2; 6 vol. 3; 5
- Main character(s): Punisher

The Punisher War Zone or Punisher War Zone is a comic book spin-off title featuring the Punisher, a fictional character published by Marvel Comics. The 2008 Marvel film, Punisher: War Zone was loosely based on the series.

== Publication history ==
The first installment of the series ran for 41 issues and two 64-page annuals. Multiple writers contributed to this series during its three-year run from 1992 to 1995. The series served mainly as a vehicle for longtime Marvel artist John Romita Jr., who had returned to Marvel after a lengthy hiatus from drawing a monthly title. In 2009, Marvel published a 6-issue limited series under the same title. The storyline was called "The Resurrection of Ma Gnucci".

=== Volume 1 ===
The first series was the third different Punisher title published and the second spin-off based on the character.

=== Volume 2 ===
This series was written by long-time Punisher writer Garth Ennis and drawn by long-time Punisher artist Steve Dillon. The series is a follow-up to Ennis's other Marvel Knights Punisher series.

=== Volume 3 ===
This series was written by Greg Rucka and is a follow-up of Rucka's previous Punisher series from 2011. It was written to complete the story which Rucka did not get to do in the main title due to its cancellation.

== Collected editions ==
- The Punisher: War Zone, Vol. 1 (collects The Punisher War Zone #1-6), September 2002, 978-0-7851-0923-5
- The Punisher: Barbarian with a Gun (collects The Punisher War Zone #26-30), November 2008, 978-0-7851-3428-2
- The Punisher: River of Blood (collects The Punisher War Zone #31-36), December 2005, 978-0-7851-1542-7
- Punisher: War Zone - The Resurrection of Ma Gnucci (collects Punisher: War Zone vol. 2, #1-6), April 2009, 978-0-7851-3822-8 (HC), August 2009, 978-0-7851-3260-8 (TPB)
- Punisher: Enter the War Zone (Collects Punisher: War Zone Vol. 3 #1-5), June 2013, 978-0785167426

== See also ==
- 1992 in comics
- 2013 in comics
