= The Punisher (2005 video game) =

2005 action video game

- Developer: Volition (Note: Amplified Games developed the mobile game.)
- Publisher: THQ
- Director: Jeff Carroll
- Producers: Rick E. White; James Tsai; Michael Hawkins
- Designers: Sandeep Shekar; Luke Schneider
- Programmers: Chris Helvig; Mark Allender
- Artists: Jasen Whiteside; Kelly Snapka
- Writers: Michael Breault; Garth Ennis; Jimmy Palmiotti; Chris Breault
- Composers: Sonic Fuel (Note: Sonic Fuel is a duo of musical composers formed by Tim Wynn and Christopher Lennertz.); Corey Jackson; Gerard Marino
- Series: The Punisher
- Platforms: PlayStation 2; Windows; Xbox; Mobile phone
- Release: NA: January 18, 2005; EU: March 4, 2005
- Genres: Action-adventure, third-person shooter
- Mode: Single-player

The Punisher is a 2005 third-person shooter action-adventure game developed by Volition and published by THQ, based on the Marvel Comics character the Punisher. It was released in 2005 for the PlayStation 2, Xbox and Windows; a mobile phone port was developed by Amplified Games, developed in 2004 and released in 2005.

The game stars the antihero the Punisher. After his family was murdered by the mafia, Frank Castle devoted his life to the punishment of criminals. Players take control of the titular ruthless vigilante to track down and kill criminals. The story is a loose hybridization of the 2004 film of the same name, as well as the Vol. 5 (2000) and Vol. 6 (2001) series of the comic books. Actor Thomas Jane reprises his role as Frank Castle/The Punisher.

An earlier video game adaptation of the film was in development by Mucky Foot Productions, but was cancelled when THQ decided to bring development in-house.

== Gameplay ==
The Punisher is primarily a third-person shooter, offering a combination of exploration and combat. Frank can carry up to three weapons, including two one-handed weapons, which can be dual-wielded at any time, and one heavier, two-handed weapon. These can also be dual wielded but only when another is available to pick up from the environment, as Frank cannot carry more than one and cannot reload them until ammunition is depleted, at which point the second weapon is dropped. Lethal and non-lethal grenades are also available.

When in close combat, Frank can grab an enemy, taking them as a human shield and performing a simple interrogation or a one-button "quick kill". Grabbed enemies can additionally be thrown through doors or in whatever direction the player chooses. The game's environments also feature interrogation "hot spots", where the Punisher can interrogate his enemies using death threats and torture, coercing them to share information that may help him in his quest. During these interrogations, an intimidation meter appears on screen, which includes the enemy's health and their breaking point. Once Frank is able to maintain the intimidation level at this breaking point for a few seconds, points are obtained and information or a service is provided. Although any common enemy can be interrogated, only the ones highlighted can offer anything useful. If the enemy's health is depleted or if Frank is overly aggressive during interrogations, the enemy is executed and points are subtracted. Points can be used to unlock upgrades for Frank at his apartment or to unlock different modes for each level.

As Frank kills enemies, a meter for "Slaughter Mode" is charged. When this mode is activated, Frank gains movement speed and puts his guns away, wielding combat knives which can be thrown at enemies or used to violently dispatch them in close quarters.

The game immediately penalizes the player for killing innocent people by ending the level.

== Plot ==
The Punisher is apprehended by law enforcement after killing several footmen of the yakuza. He is transferred to Ryker's Island and interrogated by lieutenant police detectives Molly von Richthofen and Martin Soap. The majority of the game occurs in flashbacks during this interrogation.

First, the Punisher raids a crack house and kills its owner, Damage, by dropping him from several stories up. He is almost hit by a car upon his exit. The Punisher traces the vehicle to a chop shop. After slaughtering the criminals there, he learns that it is owned by the Gnucci crime family, led by Ma Gnucci, because Carlo Duka, the shop's owner, is a Gnucci lieutenant; the Punisher drops him in a car compactor where Duka is crushed. In a subsequent mission, the Punisher kills one of Ma Gnucci's sons, Bobby, at Lucky's Bar.

Ma Gnucci hires Bushwacker to capture Joan, a neighbor of the Punisher. The Punisher traces her to the Central Park Zoo, where he rescues her. The next mission occurs in Grey's Funeral Home, at the mob funeral of Bobby Gnucci. The Punisher massacres the funeral party and kills Eddie Gnucci by throwing Eddie out a window and impaling him on a spike. The Punisher then travels to the Gnucci estate to kill Bushwacker and Ma Gnucci herself. After fighting his way through Ma's remaining men, Punisher defeats Bushwacker in a gunfight. Punisher rips his weapon arm off, shoots him in the chest, and drops him from several stories up. The Punisher hunts down Ma and kills her.

During the Punisher's assault at the Gnucci residence, he learns that the Gnuccis are getting drug money from Russian mercenaries at New York City's waterfront. At the docks, he hears that General Kreigkopf plans to smuggle nuclear weapons into New York City. He clears a suspected cargo ship of white slaves but fails to find the device. After being assaulted in his apartment by a large man called the Russian, the Punisher attacks Grand Nixon Island, his next lead on the weapon's location. On the island, the Punisher meets Colonel Nick Fury, who helps him defeat Kreigkopf and The Russian as well as prevent the launch of the nuclear device. Both escape before the missile detonates, destroying Grand Nixon Island.

Returning home, the Punisher discovers that the Kingpin has been taking over former Gnucci rackets. He raids the headquarters of the Kingpin's Fisk Industries, where he fights and defeats Bullseye by throwing him out a window from the top floor of the skyscraper. Kingpin tells the Punisher that his real enemy is the Japanese yakuza. The Punisher learns that this group of yakuza is called the Eternal Sun, and they are trying to control the remaining Gnucci and Russian crime operations.

The Punisher then visits Stark Towers, a facility owned by Tony Stark/Iron Man, after learning that the Eternal Sun is attempting to steal some high tech weapons and armor. The Punisher assaults the Takagi building, the home of the Eternal Sun leader, Takagi. He discovers that John Saint/Jigsaw has infiltrated the gang, and is gaining followers. While Jigsaw is being imprisoned in Ryker's Island, the Eternal Sun is already planning to bust him out. After escaping the Takagi building, the Punisher allows himself to be captured by Lieutenant Martin Soap, who has been providing information to the Punisher. He is taken to Ryker's Island, as per his plan.

At this time, the flashbacks catch up to the story, and the remainder of the game takes place in the present. During the interrogation, a riot erupts in the prison. The Punisher escapes from his cell, and starts fighting his way through the inmates and remaining Eternal Sun members the Punisher left alive. He reaches the rooftop and meets Jigsaw face-to-face, ultimately defeating him despite the stolen Iron Man armor Jigsaw was wearing. As the Punisher leaves in a helicopter, he throws Jigsaw out, killing him.

In the post-credits scene, Bullseye is loaded onto a stretcher as the Kingpin plots his revenge against the Punisher.

== Characters ==
The game features many cameo appearances from Marvel Comics characters, namely the Avengers such as Iron Man and Nick Fury, the Marvel Knights such as Black Widow and Matt Murdock (the alter ego of Daredevil), as well as arch-enemies including Bushwacker, Bullseye, and the Kingpin.

Also present are several characters from the Welcome Back, Frank storyline such as the lieutenant detectives Martin Soap and Molly von Richthofen, the Punisher's neighbors Joan and Spacker Dave, Ma Gnucci, the Russian and General Kreigkopf.

== Reception ==
Reception

Aggregate scores
Aggregator	Score
GameRankings	(Xbox) 73% (PS2) 72% (PC) 67% (Mobile) 46%
Metacritic	(Xbox) 69/100 (PS2) 68/100 (PC) 67/100

Review scores
Publication	Score
Edge	5/10
Electronic Gaming Monthly	6.83/10
Eurogamer	5/10
Game Informer	7.5/10
GamePro	3/5
GameRevolution	C
GameSpot	6.6/10 (PC) 6.5/10 (Mobile) 4.6/10
GameSpy	3.5/5
GameZone	(PS2) 8.5/10 (Xbox) 7.5/10 (PC) 6.5/10
IGN	8/10
Official U.S. PlayStation Magazine	3.5/5
Official Xbox Magazine (US)	6.8/10
PC Gamer (US)	66%
Detroit Free Press	3/4
Maxim	10/10

The game received mixed reviews, criticizing the game's sound effects and the linear and repetitive gameplay, but praising its system of torture, the storyline, the inordinate amount of violence and the Punisher himself. Maxim contributor Gene Newman opined in his review that this game "makes the Grand Theft Auto series look like Super Mario Kart". The Detroit Free Press gave the Xbox version a score of three stars out of four and stated: "This isn't a game that requires a lot of skill. But if you can get past the gore, it's a rarity in the comic book world: a game that stays true to the original work and doesn't stink". The Sydney Morning Herald, however, gave the game a score of three stars out of five and called it "dark, violent and derivative, but nowhere near as flawed as the movie".

The game sold around one million copies and was profitable for Volition.

=== Controversy ===
The Punisher features extremely gruesome scenes of torture and gore. It allows the player to directly control the manner and intensity of a captive's suffering during the interrogations. Because of this, Volition's vice president of product development, Dan Cermak, consulted with the Entertainment Software Rating Board (ESRB) in January 2004 (one year ahead of the game's targeted release date). The ESRB confirmed Cermak's fears that the early cut of the game he showed them would meet its "Adults Only" (AO) rating (which severely hampers commercial availability because most retailers will not sell AO-rated video games). To get a more commercially viable "Mature" rating instead, the developers rendered the interrogation scenes in black and white in order to reduce their visual impact, adjusted the camera so that certain instances of violence can be heard but not seen, and added a penalty for players who needlessly kill victims after they have confessed.

In the UK, the British Board of Film Classification (BBFC) worked with THQ to further extend the solarization effect on the scenes, distancing the camera before the killings and adding a zoom effect during them, in order to pass it with an 18 certificate, making The Punisher one of the only games to require BBFC cuts in order to be rated 18.

In Australia, the Australian Classification Board (ACB) demanded similar cuts, including the removal of two scenes altogether. In Germany, the game was placed on the Federal Department for Media Harmful to Young Persons (BPjS or BPjM) list.
