= The Punisher: One Last Kill =

2026 Marvel Studios television special

- Release poster
- Genre: Action-adventure; Crime drama; Superhero
- Based on: Marvel Comics
- Written by: Jon Bernthal; Reinaldo Marcus Green
- Directed by: Reinaldo Marcus Green
- Starring: Jon Bernthal; Deborah Ann Woll; Jason R. Moore; Judith Light
- Music by: Kris Bowers
- Country of origin: United States
- Original language: English

Production
- Executive producers: Kevin Feige; Louis D'Esposito; Brad Winderbaum; Sana Amanat; Jon Bernthal; Reinaldo Marcus Green
- Producer: David Chambers
- Production location: New York City
- Cinematography: Robert Elswit
- Editor: Melissa Lawson Cheung
- Running time: 51 minutes
- Production company: Marvel Television

Original release
- Network: Disney+
- Release: May 12, 2026

Related
- The Punisher; Daredevil: Born Again; Marvel's Special Presentations

The Punisher: One Last Kill is an American television special directed by Reinaldo Marcus Green and written by Jon Bernthal and Green for the streaming service Disney+, based on Marvel Comics featuring the character Punisher. It is the third Special Presentation in the Marvel Cinematic Universe (MCU), sharing continuity with the films and television series of the franchise. Produced by Marvel Studios under its Marvel Television label, the special is the second MCU production centered on the character following the television series The Punisher (2017–2019), which was produced by the previous Marvel Television company and originally released on Netflix. In One Last Kill, Frank Castle is haunted by ghosts of his past as he tries to move on from his life as the brutal vigilante Punisher after avenging the deaths of his family, only to be drawn back into conflict by crime lord Ma Gnucci.

Bernthal reprises his role as Castle from Marvel's Netflix television series and the Disney+ series Daredevil: Born Again (2025–present), with Deborah Ann Woll, Jason R. Moore, and Judith Light (Gnucci) also starring. Following the cancellation of The Punisher in 2019, Bernthal was cast for Born Again in March 2023. A special featuring his character was conceived during filming of the first season of that series, with Bernthal and Green revealed to be working on the project with Marvel Studios in February 2025. Filming took place in New York City from mid-July to early August. The special's title was revealed in March 2026 along with its release date.

The Punisher: One Last Kill was released on May 12, 2026, as part of Phase Six of the MCU.

== Plot ==
Frank Castle, as the brutal vigilante known as the Punisher, kills members of the Gnucci Crime Family who are believed to be the last criminals involved in the deaths of his family. The Gnucci's former territory in New York City's Little Sicily neighborhood becomes overrun with crime. Castle lives in a Little Sicily apartment complex where he is haunted by hallucinations of people from his past. After locking up his Punisher gear, Castle goes to his family's graves to kill himself but is stopped by a hallucination of his daughter Lisa.

Castle walks aimlessly through the chaotic streets, haunted by an apparition of his military friend Curtis Hoyle. He is cornered by crime lord Ma Gnucci, the matriarch of the Gnucci Crime Family, who seeks revenge for Castle's murder of her husband and three sons. Gnucci reveals that she has placed a bounty on Castle's head, attracting every common criminal in the area. Returning to his apartment, he sees a vision of his friend Karen Page, who scolds Castle for his failures but also consoles him.

A small army of criminals enters the apartment complex and attacks residents looking for Castle. When his room is set on fire, Castle escapes and ruthlessly dispatches criminals, fighting his way to the rooftop before jumping off. He has an opportunity to pursue Gnucci, but instead decides to protect local shop owner Dre, his wife Debbie, and their daughter Charli. After the fighting is over, Charli gives Castle a paper rose which he puts on Lisa's grave. Castle decides that he still has work to do as the Punisher.

Castle returns to the streets with a new Punisher costume and arsenal. He stops a group of thugs from attacking innocent people and kills their leader.

== Cast ==
- Jon Bernthal as Frank Castle / Punisher:
  A vigilante who, following the brutal murder of his family, aims to fight the criminal underworld by any means necessary, no matter how lethal the results are. Bernthal hoped One Last Kill would "get Frank from this place in his life where he is reeling and spiraling out of control, a man who is set on absolute vengeance, to a place where he can find some meaning, where he can find something new to fight for". He was also excited by the special's "new take" on the character, with Castle finding some purpose. Bernthal also said the special would get to "the essential question of who he is".
- Deborah Ann Woll as Karen Page:
  A former reporter and law firm partner with Matt Murdock, who befriended Castle while preparing his case during the second season of Daredevil (2016) and later aided him during the events of The Punisher (2017–2019). She appears to Castle as a figment of his imagination.
- Jason R. Moore as Curtis Hoyle:
  Castle's close friend and a former U.S. Navy SARC who became the leader of a therapy group after losing the lower part of his left leg in combat. He appears to Castle as a figment of his imagination.
- Judith Light as Ma Gnucci: The matriarch of the Gnucci Crime Family who puts a bounty out on Castle for the murder of her family

Also appearing are Kelli Barrett, reprising her role as Castle's deceased wife Maria from The Punisher; Andre Royo as Dre, a shopkeeper; John Douglas Thompson as an older veteran; Nick Koumalatsos and Colton Hill, portraying members of Castle's Marine squad; Bernthal's daughter Addie as Castle's deceased daughter Lisa; Mila Jaymes as Charli, Dre's daughter; Eduardo Campirano as Castle's deceased son Frank Jr.; Mugga as Debbie, Dre's wife; Dónall Ó Héalai as Mickey, a thug who attacks the older veteran; Jamal Lloyd Johnson as Barry, Ma Gnucci's bodyguard, implied to be the Marvel Comics character Barracuda; Rafael R. Green as Isaiah, a boy who lives in Frank's apartment building; and Roe Rancell as Dennis, a disturbed homeless man. The Gnucci Crime Family includes Dominick Mancino as Benny, Ma's husband; Joseph Devito as Bobby, a police lieutenant and Ma's son; Henry Corvino as Eddie Jr., Ma's grandson; and David Manuele as Ma's son Carlo. News casters Annika Pergament and David Collins appear as themselves.

== Production ==
=== Background ===
In June 2015, Jon Bernthal was cast as the Marvel Comics character Punisher for the second season of the Netflix series Daredevil (2015–2018), which was produced by Marvel Television. In April 2016, Netflix ordered the spin-off series The Punisher (2017–2019), with Bernthal reprising his role as Frank Castle / Punisher. Both series were canceled by the end of February 2019, not long before Marvel Television was folded into Marvel Studios, the production company behind the Marvel Cinematic Universe (MCU) films. A Disney+ revival series titled Daredevil: Born Again (2025–present) was announced by Marvel Studios in July 2022. Bernthal was set to reprise his role by March 2023, but soon left the series because he did not agree with the direction it was taking Castle. After Born Again underwent a creative overhaul and former The Punisher writer Dario Scardapane was hired to be its showrunner, Bernthal returned and had input on the character's portrayal. He felt the first season of Born Again "opened the door to getting closer to the Frank Castle that I really, really want to portray".

=== Development ===
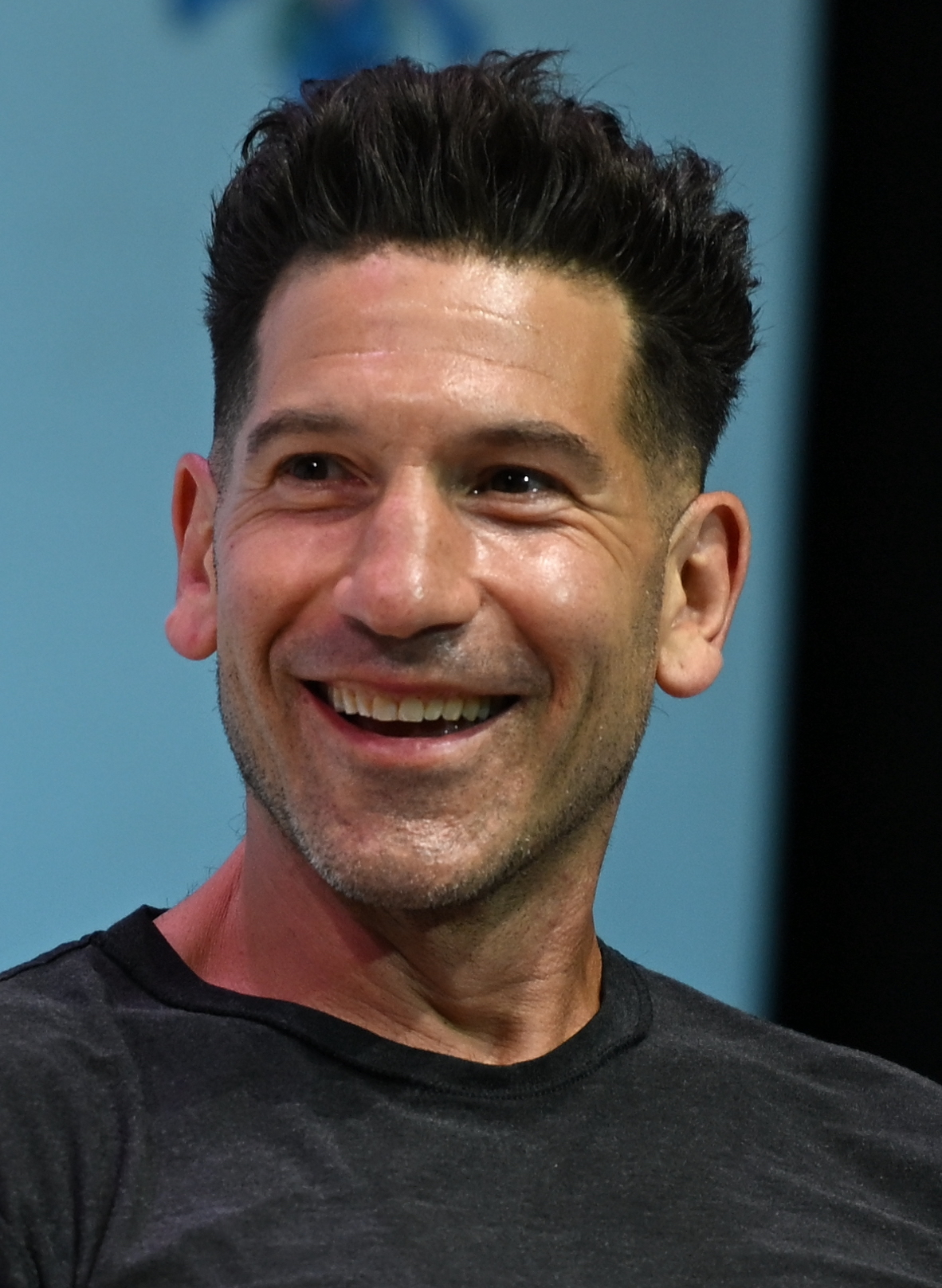
Jon Bernthal co-wrote One Last Kill and reprises his role as Frank Castle from previous MCU media.

During filming for the first season of Born Again, Bernthal conceived a story for a television special focused on the Punisher. The end of the season sees Castle arrested by New York City Mayor Wilson Fisk and later breaking out of his prison. Marvel Studios looked at some of Bernthal's previous writing and then asked him to pitch the special to them before it moved forward. He said that he did not want them to "just hand it to me... they've held me accountable to every step along the way. I really want to earn this and I really want this to be good." Brad Winderbaum, the head of streaming, television, and animation at Marvel Studios, revealed that the special was in development under the "Special Presentation" banner in February 2025. Reinaldo Marcus Green was set to direct the special and was writing the screenplay with Bernthal, after they worked together on the film King Richard (2021) and the miniseries We Own This City (2022). Winderbaum said the character was very important to Bernthal, who he felt had turned the Punisher into an "icon". In March 2026, the special's title was revealed as The Punisher: One Last Kill, releasing as a "Marvel Television Special Presentation". The special is one of the first works produced based on Bernthal's writing. It received a TV-MA rating, and is approximately 45 minutes long. Executive producers include Marvel Studios' Kevin Feige, Louis D'Esposito, Winderbaum, and Sana Amanat, along with Bernthal and Green.

=== Writing ===
Winderbaum said the Punisher was driven by pain, revenge, and justice, and felt the character was most interesting in stories that explored how his philosophy leads to specific ways of seeking justice. He described the special as "a shotgun blast of a story, but [it] also has all the pathos and emotion that you want out of a Frank Castle story". Bernthal said the special would be a "version that this character deserves" and not "Punisher-lite", later adding that it has the most "high-octane" portrayal of the character yet seen. He said the special would have a "visceral, psychologically complex, unforgiving, no-holds-barred version of Frank where he's going to turn his back to the audience. And nothing is easy and all violence has a cost, and we're going to see that cost. I'm grateful that they're letting me go to the places that I really want to go." As well, Bernthal hoped One Last Kill, which begins with Castle "at his end" and "enveloped in hopelessness", would help get the character "beyond the spiraling, reeling, kind of vigilante" who is looking to suppress his trauma to one who acts in the name of justice. Bernthal brought in former Marine Raider Nick Koumalatsos, who helped him train for Born Again, as a consultant on the special, and also consulted with Marine Raider Cody Alford and United States Army Special Forces Colton Hill; all three were cast to appear in the special. Green said the three helped inform Castle's psychological state. The comic book series The Punisher vol. 5 (2000–2001)—by Garth Ennis, Steve Dillon, and Jimmy Palmiotti, known as The Punisher: Welcome Back, Frank—served as inspiration for One Last Kill. The character Ma Gnucci, who debuted in that comic, appears in the special. The films Mean Streets (1973) and Goodfellas (1990), both directed by Martin Scorsese, also served as influences for the special.

The special explores Castle's "psychological state" going into the MCU film Spider-Man: Brand New Day (2026), for which Bernthal filmed his scenes back-to-back with those for One Last Kill. He said it was important to himself, Spider-Man actor Tom Holland, and director Destin Daniel Cretton that the film's portrayal of the Punisher feel like the same character that is seen in the special. Due to Bernthal's commitments to One Last Kill and Brand New Day, Castle does not appear in the second season of Born Again (2026), with Scardapane stating that the character's absence from the season was because of the story Bernthal wanted to tell with the special, which focuses on what happened to Castle after his final Marvel's Netflix television series appearance in the second season of The Punisher (2019), as well as before and during the second season of Born Again; the special is concurrent with the events of that season. One Last Kill features Karen Page and Curtis Hoyle, two character who appeared in The Punisher on Netflix. Green said they were included in the special to remind audiences of Castle's past journey.

=== Casting ===
Bernthal was set to reprise his role as Frank Castle / Punisher in the special when it was announced. In July 2025, set photos revealed Roe Rancell in the supporting role of Dennis, as well as Jason R. Moore reprising his role as Curtis Hoyle from The Punisher. In May 2026, Judith Light was revealed to be playing Ma Gnucci, while Deborah Ann Woll was confirmed to be reprising her MCU role as Karen Page. Also appearing in the special are Mila Jaymes as Charli; Koumalatsos as Nick and Colton Hill as Colton, members of Castle's Marine squad; and Jamal Lloyd Johnson as Barry, who is implied to be the Marvel Comics character Barracuda.

=== Design ===
Emily Gunshor and Michael Shaw were, respectively, the costume designer and production designer for the special, after previously working on the first and second seasons of Born Again.

=== Filming ===
Principal photography began by July 17, 2025, in New York City, under the working title Jolly Roger, with Robert Elswit as cinematographer. Filming took place in Queens on Jamaica Avenue, as well as near Green-Wood Cemetery in Brooklyn. A building exterior featured signs for Gnucci's Family Restaurant, believed to be a reference to Ma Gnucci and the Gnucci Crime Family; the Gnucci Crime Family was previously featured in The Punisher. Filming occurred over 12 days and wrapped on August 4, 2025.

=== Post-production ===
Melissa Lawson Cheung edited the special, after previously working on the first two seasons of Born Again. One of the action shots was criticized for its obvious use of a CGI model for Bernthal falling off a roof onto a metal box, with the model compared to the graphics quality of the PlayStation 3 and visually to the character Joel from The Last of Us (2013). James Hibberd at The Hollywood Reporter and Germain Lussier at Gizmodo reported that the shot was performed in-camera, though featured a stunt person performing the fall with their face swapped for Bernthal's with visual effects. Hibberd said that "might explain some of the wonkiness", while Lussier called it "just a bad VFX shot" and was uncertain if the shot would be adjusted.

=== Music ===
Green's frequent collaborator Kris Bowers was revealed to be composing the score for One Last Kill in April 2026. Bowers previously scored the MCU miniseries Secret Invasion (2023). His score for the special was released digitally by Marvel Music and Hollywood Records on May 15.

== Marketing ==
In October 2024, Marvel Comics announced a new publishing line titled Marvel Premier Collection, which consists of new paperback editions of popular comic book runs that are considered to be good starting points for new readers. Punisher: Welcome Back, Frank, collecting The Punisher (2000) series by Ennis, Dillon, and Palmiotti, was released in March 2026 with a new introduction from Ennis and a foreword by Bernthal. Footage from the special was included in a trailer for the second season of Born Again released on April 6, 2026, ahead of a full trailer for the special which was released on April 9. Commentators noted the return of Hoyle from The Punisher in the trailer, but questioned if he was appearing to Castle as a hallucination or memory. The lack of specifics regarding the special's plot was also noted. Despite this, Kyle Anderson of Nerdist said the special appeared to have the "classic Punisher vibe of sad violence", while Gizmodo's Cheryl Eddy said the trailer had "all the angst and emotional torture that accompanies" the character's violence. Jordan King at Empire praised the trailer for its looks at Castle in "pure, baddie-pulping mode" as well as his psychological state. He wondered if the narrator of the trailer was Punisher comics villain Barracuda. Chrishaun Baker of Inverse felt Bernthal's portrayal of the character had become "stagnant", with him never fully committing to his war against the criminal underworld and instead being in a "continued state of false retirement and denial". Baker wondered if the special's subtitle was meant to be ironic, where Castle gives "into his urges in what he believes will be 'the last time', only to finally accept the truth of who he is". Aaron Couch and Borys Kit of The Hollywood Reporter reported that the trailer was the most-watched for a Special Presentation, although specific viewership data was not available.

== Release ==
The Punisher: One Last Kill was released on Disney+ on May 12, 2026. Upon release, some viewers experienced audio issues on Disney+. It was originally reported to be set for release alongside the second season of Born Again, which debuted in March 2026, before Bernthal said the special would be released around the same time as Brand New Day in July 2026. One Last Kill was ultimately released a week after Born Again's second-season finale. It is part of Phase Six of the MCU.

== Reception ==
=== Viewership ===
Streaming analytics firm FlixPatrol, which monitors daily updated VOD charts and streaming ratings worldwide, reported that The Punisher: One Last Kill ranked as the most-watched title on Disney+ worldwide following its premiere, reaching No. 1 on the platform's global charts. The special also topped Disney+'s rankings in multiple categories and ranked ahead of other films and television series available on the service. TVision, which uses its Power Score metric to evaluate connected TV (CTV) programming based on viewership and engagement across more than 1,000 apps, announced that it placed fourth among the most-streamed films in the U.S. through May 2026. In June 2026, The Punisher: One Last Kill ranked eighth among films measured by TVision. The film remained on Disney+'s "Global Top 10 Movies" list from its premiere on May 12 through July 9, according to FlixPatrol. Luminate, which measures streaming performance in the United States using viewership data, audience engagement metrics, and content reach across multiple platforms, reported that The Punisher: One Last Kill generated 12.2 million views during the first half of 2026.

=== Critical response ===
On review aggregator Rotten Tomatoes, 73% of 74 critics gave the special a positive review, and the average of rated reviews was 6.70 out of 10. The critics consensus reads, "A pared-down, no-holds-barred actioner that further cements Jon Bernthal as the definitive interpreter of The Punisher in a self-contained, marvelous story that goes above and beyond for One Last Kill." Metacritic, which uses a weighted average, assigned a score of 63 out of 100 based on 15 critics, indicating "generally favorable" reviews.

Jordan Moreau at Variety called One Last Kill "a powerful character study of a PTSD-addled veteran who has lost nearly everything" and "a fitting interlude" for the character. He said the special "cements [Bernthal's] Punisher as one of Marvel's most singular performances". Hoai-Tran Bui of Inverse said One Last Kill was "both an intense, intimate character study, and a relentlessly action-packed gorefest" and believed it was too short. Overall she felt it was "a bit of a disappointment" since it "retraces the steps that every other MCU Punisher story arc has done before, and offers nothing else new", calling One Last Kill, more of a "coda" to The Punisher rather than a bridge between the character's appearances in Born Again and Brand New Day.

Giving One Last Kill a 5 out of 10, Jeremy Mathai writing for /Film said it was very surface level, saying, "Neither long enough to tell us anything we didn't know about the antihero, nor interesting enough to merit this brief detour, this special ends up the exact opposite of its title character: inessential, forgettable, and, at worst, a cautionary tale of superhero stories that are never allowed to end." Mathai praised Bernthal's performance and Green's directing in the first half of the special, and wished the second half of the special had the "same momentum and narrative drive" as the first; he did call the action of the second half "some of the best action ever captured in any MCU installment". Den of Geek's Joe George was critical of the special, giving it 2 out of 5 stars. He felt One Last Kill could have done more to explore the similarities between Castle and Ma Gnucci's losses, how the United States "mistreats its veterans", and "the fascist implications of a hero who finds meaning only by killing those who threaten the true community". Regarding the action of the special, George said it became derivative of "a 20-year-old episode of The Shield" and was critical of Green's visual style and Bernthal's acting choices with the character.
