= Frank Castle (Marvel Cinematic Universe) =

Character in the Marvel Cinematic Universe

- Marvel Cinematic Universe character
- Jon Bernthal as Castle in a promotional image for the first season of The Punisher (2017).
- First appearance: "Bang"; Daredevil; March 18, 2016
- Based on: Punisher by: Gerry Conway; Ross Andru; John Romita Sr.
- Adapted by: Douglas Petrie; Marco Ramirez
- Portrayed by: Jon Bernthal

In-universe information
- Full name: Francis David Castle Sr.
- Alias: Pete Castiglione
- Nickname: Frank
- Title(s): The Punisher; The Avenger
- Occupation: Vigilante; U.S. Marine Corps 1st Lieutenant
- Affiliation: Cerberus Squad; Force Recon; CIA
- Spouse: Maria Castle
- Significant other: Beth Quinn
- Children: Lisa Castle (daughter); Frank Castle Jr. (son)
- Nationality: Italian-American

Francis David Castle Sr. is a fictional character portrayed by Jon Bernthal in media set in the Marvel Cinematic Universe (MCU)—based on the Marvel Comics character of the same name—commonly known by his alias, The Punisher. In the MCU, Castle is a Marine who, after suffering the murder of his wife and children, becomes a lethal vigilante determined to take revenge and stop crime using all necessary means.

Castle also came into conflict with Matt Murdock / Daredevil, and after being sentenced to life imprisonment, he was freed with the help of Wilson Fisk and also strengthened his friendship with Karen Page, until he discovered that Ray Schoonover was actually responsible for the murder of his family, or at least one of them, and even offered to help Murdock fight The Hand organization. With David Lieberman's help, Castle pursued others involved in the murder of his family, William Rawlins III and his own close friend Billy Russo, while protecting a girl named Amy Bendix. Nine years later, Castle reunites with Murdock and learns that Fisk has risen to power as Mayor of New York City, leading a group of corrupt NYPD officers known as the Anti-Vigilante Task Force (AVTF). Contacted by Page, Castle supports Murdock in his fight against the AVTF. However, Castle is captured and imprisoned in Fisk's dungeon, until he manages to trick a guard into letting himself go. Castle has been in hiding for months, until he encounters Ma Gnucci, the matriarch of the Gnucci crime family, whom he killed months ago. After resuming his crusade against crime, Castle joins forces with Spider-Man to face Jean Grey, a telepath who has been terrorizing the city.

Introduced in the second season of the Marvel Television / Netflix series Daredevil (2016), Bernthal signed a deal to return for a spin-off series, The Punisher (2017–2019); his portrayal of the character has been positively received. Following the cancellation of Marvel's Netflix series, including Daredevil and The Punisher, Bernthal reprised the role in Marvel Studios productions, including the first season of the Marvel Television / Disney+ series Daredevil: Born Again (2025), the television special The Punisher: One Last Kill as part of Marvel's Special Presentations, and made his film debut in Spider-Man: Brand New Day (both 2026).

== Concept and creation ==
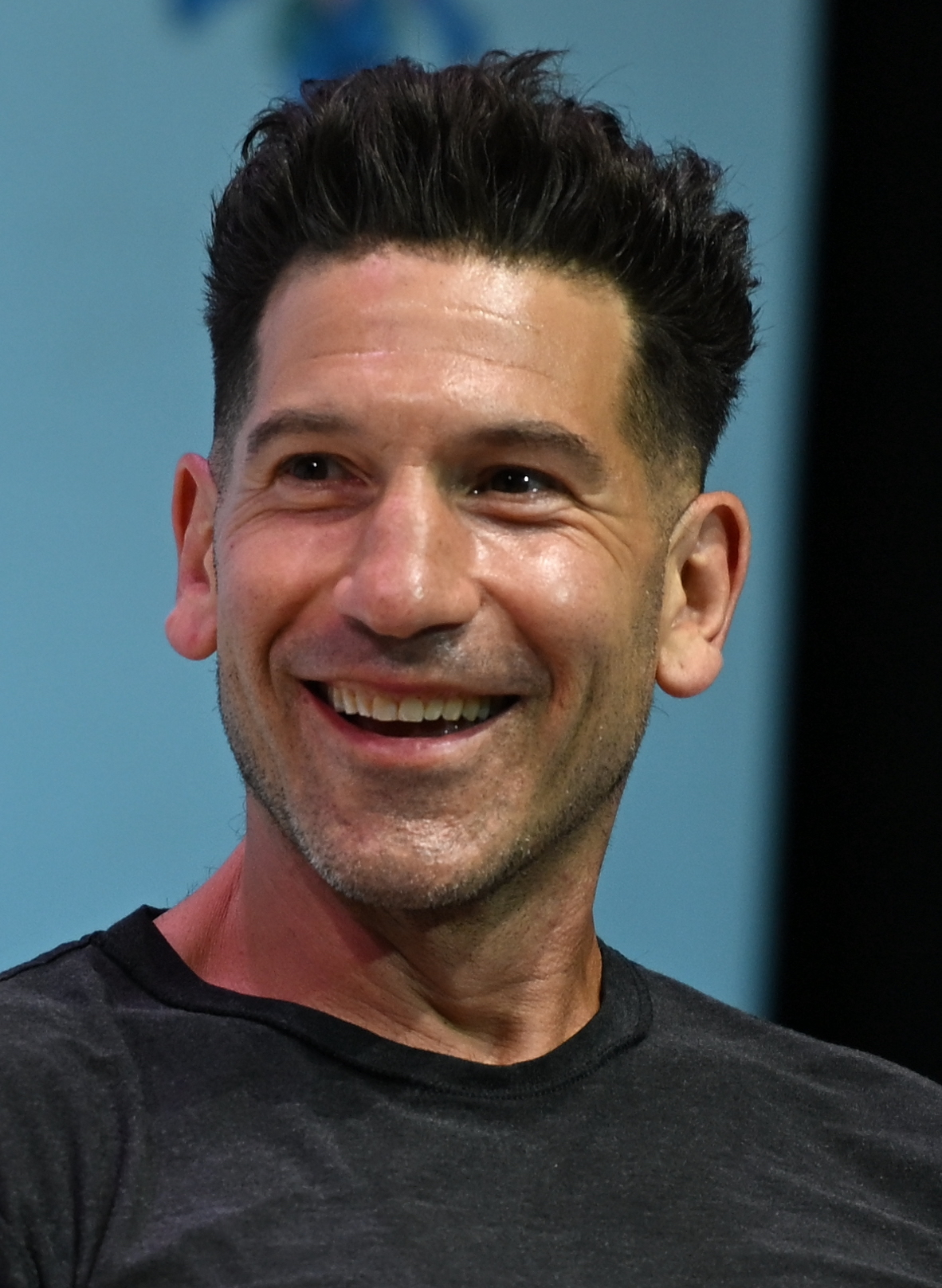
Jon Bernthal portrays Frank Castle in the Marvel Cinematic Universe

In June 2015, Marvel announced that Jon Bernthal had been cast as Frank Castle / Punisher for the second season of Daredevil. Steven DeKnight and the first season's writers had discussed introducing the character in a post-credits scene during the first-season finale, but were unable to due to the way that Netflix then-began auto-playing the next episode during the credits of the current one. The scene would have seen Leland Owlsley escape rather than be killed by Wilson Fisk, only to be killed by Castle, whose face would not be revealed, but whose iconic skull insignia would have been featured. DeKnight felt that this "was the right decision. I think there's a better, more organic way to introduce him to the world." A spin-off series centered on Castle had entered development by January 2016. The series, The Punisher, was officially ordered that April, and the first season was released on Netflix in November 2017.

DeKnight said this version of Punisher would be "completely the Marvel version", as previous portrayals did not appear under the Marvel Studios / Marvel Television banner. He also felt Bernthal's Punisher would not be as "graphically violent" as in the film Punisher: War Zone (2008).

== Fictional character biography ==
=== Becoming the Punisher ===
Frank Castle, a former Force Recon Marine, embarks on a violent campaign against organized crime in New York City following the murder of his wife and children during a mass shooting. The massacre, later revealed to be the result of a failed sting operation involving the Irish Mob, the Cartel, and the Dogs of Hell, is covered up by law enforcement, leaving Castle as the sole survivor. Seeking retribution, he systematically eliminates members of these criminal organizations, becoming known as "the Punisher".

Castle's actions bring him into conflict with Daredevil, who opposes his lethal methods. Their ideological differences are highlighted when Castle captures Daredevil and attempts to convince him that criminals should be permanently eliminated rather than subjected to the legal system. Castle later survives an ambush by the Irish Mob and retaliates by massacring their leadership. Castle is eventually arrested and put on trial, with Foggy Nelson and Matt Murdock (secretly the civil identity of Daredevil) representing him, while establishing a close relationship with their secretary Karen Page. His former commanding officer, Ray Schoonover, testifies on his behalf, but Castle deliberately disrupts his defense by openly admitting to his killings in court, resulting in a life sentence.

While imprisoned at Ryker's Island, Castle is manipulated by Wilson Fisk into assassinating another inmate, Dutton. After fulfilling his task, Castle realizes he has been set up and is targeted for elimination. However, he kills multiple inmates and ultimately forces Fisk to release him, allowing him to continue his mission outside prison. Upon resuming his investigation, Castle uncovers the truth behind his family's deaths. He learns that the Blacksmith, the orchestrator of the failed sting operation, is Schoonover. Castle confronts and executes him, subsequently discovering a hidden weapons cache and body armor.

Castle paints a skull emblem onto his new body armor and provides sniper support to Daredevil during a confrontation with the Hand. With his personal vendetta seemingly resolved, he later burns down his family's former home, symbolizing he has fully embraced his identity as the Punisher, and disappears into the night.

=== Uncovering a conspiracy ===
Castle finishes hunting down the criminals involved in the death of his family. Six months later, he works at a construction site but struggles with his isolation. Castle reconnects with fellow veteran Curtis Hoyle for emotional support while being haunted by his past in Afghanistan. Castle's life changes when he meets Micro, a former NSA analyst, who reveals a video implicating Castle's military unit in the death of a foreign national, Ahmad Zubair, during a mission in Kandahar. This discovery leads Castle to team up with Micro to uncover government corruption and the truth behind his past.

Castle learns about Cerberus, a special military unit involved in morally questionable operations. After a disastrous mission that caused the death of several soldiers, Castle lost faith in the military system. His quest for revenge intensifies as he uncovers a conspiracy involving government officials like William Rawlins, who orchestrated his family's deaths and had links to illegal weapons trades. Castle's partnership with Micro deepens, but the involvement of Micro's family causes Castle to question the consequences of his actions. Meanwhile, Homeland Security agent Dinah Madani investigates Castle's past, leading to a standoff between them.

Castle then discovers his friend Billy Russo betrayed him, knowing about the plan to kill Castle's family. In a confrontation, Castle disfigures Russo's face instead of killing him. Castle also confronts and takes down Rawlins, allowing Micro to reunite with his family. Despite being offered a new life, Castle chooses to remain as the Punisher, understanding that the cost of his vengeance will stay with him.

=== Protecting Amy Bendix ===
A year later, Castle helps a young girl named Rachel escape a dangerous group at a bar. After a shootout, they flee to a motel, where Castle learns Rachel's real name is Amy Bendix. The group continues to pursue them, leading to a series of confrontations. Castle calls Madani for help but is left to defend himself. Flashbacks reveal John Pilgrim's past as a white supremacist and his mission to capture Castle and Bendix. Castle and Bendix escape to New York, where Castle seeks information about Russo. Meanwhile, Russo has recovered and begins manipulating veterans for a robbery spree.

Castle tracks down the Russians who hired Bendix's group, killing most of them and sparing their leader, Poloznev, who is later killed by Pilgrim. Castle finds out that Russo is planning more violence, and Castle confronts him. During the standoff, Castle realizes Russo has amnesia and does not remember killing his family. Russo's gang continues its crime spree, and Castle confronts Russo, revealing he was responsible for Russo's scars. Russo's men ambush Castle, but Castle survives and finds Russo at Valhalla.

After a brutal battle at Valhalla, Castle learns he was set up for the murder of three women. He is arrested but later freed by Page and Madani. Castle and Bendix escape, but Pilgrim continues to pursue them. Castle kills Russo and confronts the Schultzes at their mansion. Castle kills Eliza Schultz and forces Anderson Schultz to take his own life. Castle, Bendix, and Pilgrim go their separate ways, and Castle embraces his role as the Punisher.

=== Reunion with Matt Murdock ===
At his hideout, Castle meets with Murdock again when the latter finds the bullet used in Hector Ayala's murder has the Punisher's symbol on it. As Murdock suggests dealing with the corrupt police officers misusing the symbol, Castle calls him out for retiring as Daredevil and not letting Benjamin "Dex" Poindexter die for killing Nelson a year prior.

Castle is contacted by Page to protect Murdock following Dex's escape. At Murdock's apartment, they fight Fisk's Anti-Vigilante Task Force (AVTF), including Ayala's murderer Cole North, whom Castle insists Murdock to kill, but the latter resists in doing so. Both escape an explosion and reunite with Page. After Murdock and Page leave, Castle decides to confront the AVTF at Red Hook but is defeated. Officer Connor Powell tries to get him to join them, but Castle rejects him and is imprisoned alongside other vigilantes. Castle later tricks a prison guard, breaks his arm, and begins to escape.

=== Conflict with Ma Gnucci ===
Months after escaping Fisk's AVTF, Castle lives in isolation, haunted by hallucinations of people from his past while continuing to mourn his family by visiting their graves and contemplating suicide. When Castle leaves them, he walks while hallucinating his friend Hoyle and encounters crime boss Ma Gnucci, matriarch of the Gnucci crime family, who seeks revenge against Castle for the murder of her husband and three sons, who were some of the parties responsible for the murder of Castle's family. Gnucci puts a price on his head and alerts all nearby criminals in her employ to his location, causing him to go into hiding and watch as common criminals ransack the building searching for him.

Castle has a vision of Page, who rebukes him for failing his family before comforting him. He kills the criminals and escapes the building, and notices Gnucci watching the chaos from the ground as he reaches the rooftop. Castle approaches Gnucci, but chooses to let her get away in order to help a store owner, Dre, and rescues the rest of his family trapped inside by the criminals. Dre's daughter, Charli, gives Castle a paper rose, which he then takes back to his daughter Lisa's grave, telling her he still has work to do as the Punisher. Castle returns with his skull vest and arsenal, apprehending a thug and returning a stolen hat to an elderly veteran whose dog was killed by the thug, before executing him.

=== Helping Spider-Man ===
At an unspecified previous point in time, Castle encountered Spider-Man on Staten Island, where the latter saved the former's life. After resuming his role as the Punisher, Castle chases a hijacked Department of Damage Control (DODC) vehicle in his battle van, and encounters Spider-Man again, who tells Castle to stop chasing the vehicle and let him handle it. When Castle refuses, Spider-Man launches himself through the van's windshield, causing Castle and his equipment to tumble out onto the road. Spider-Man again encourages Castle to go back home.

Some time later, Spider-Man arrives to Castle's home with a woman named MJ. Spider-Man explains MJ is in danger and that he has nowhere else to go, leveraging the fact that he had saved Castle's life to plead his case. Castle allows the two inside, and he and MJ help Spider-Man develop two power inhibitors; one specifically for his mutating arachnid DNA, and a universal inhibitor for Jean Grey, a telepath who perpetrated the vehicle hijacking and has been psionically controlling people to attack DODC facilities. As Spider-Man departs to apprehend Jean, MJ urges Castle to follow and help him.

Castle arrives to the DODC building to find Spider-Man battling Bruce Banner, who is under Jean's control and has transformed into his destructive alternate personality, the Hulk. The two agree to split up, with Spider-Man handling the Hulk and Castle searching for Jean, who ambushes and possesses him, forcing him to blow open a vault door where DODC agents are hiding. Spider-Man puts the inhibitor on Jean, who is taken into custody, and Castle regains control of his body.

Shortly after, Castle witnesses a psionic explosion that locks down part of the city. He calls Spider-Man, who explains that Damage Control had lied to them and Jean has lost control of her abilities. Spider-Man arrives to the DODC detention center to rescue her, while Castle sets up on a rooftop to kill her with a sniper rifle. He fires the weapon, but Spider-Man steps in front of her, receiving serious injuries. Jean keeps Spider-Man alive long enough for medical help to arrive, and flees the city afterward. Castle, overcome with guilt, stays with Spider-Man in his hospital room, learning he is really a young man named Peter Parker. When Parker wakes up, Castle apologizes and puts on the Spider-Man mask to masquerade as him to fans gathered outside the building, allowing Parker to leave innocuously and helping protect his identity.

== Appearances ==
Jon Bernthal first portrays Frank Castle / Punisher in two of the Netflix series of the Marvel Cinematic Universe by Marvel Television: introduced in a supporting role in the second season of Daredevil (2016), he later starred as the character in the spin-off series The Punisher (2017–2019). Bernthal reprises the role in Marvel Studios productions, beginning with the Disney+ series Daredevil: Born Again (2025), and followed by the television special The Punisher: One Last Kill (2026), marketed under the "Marvel Television Special Presentation" banner, and the film Spider-Man: Brand New Day (2026), which marked the character's theatrical debut.

== Characterization ==
Daredevil season two showrunner Doug Petrie stated that Robert De Niro's character Travis Bickle from the film Taxi Driver (1976) was an influence on the character, as well as current events, saying, "Taking lethal justice into your own hands in America in 2015 is tricky shit. We have not shied away from the rich complicated reality of Now. If you've got a gun and you're not the police you're going to incite strong feelings." Bernthal added that "This character has resonated with law enforcement and military ... and the best thing about him is that if he offends you, he just doesn't care." Bernthal studied all the previous portrayals of Punisher, saying, "once you devour and eat up as much as you can, my way is to make it as personal as possible". On how Castle resonates with him, Bernthal said, "He ain't got a fucking cape. He ain't got any superpowers. He's a fucking tortured, angry father and husband who's living in this unbelievable world of darkness and loss and torment." Bernthal added that there would be "a military component" in the series since Castle is "a soldier... [The series] will be somewhat centered on that". He also stated that "the character that was portrayed on Daredevil season two was sort of the origin tale of how this guy became the Punisher, why he put on the vest." Bernthal noted he "always want[ed] to preserve the essence of" Castle, who Bernthal described as "brutal", "damaged," and "tortured", by exploring "the pain and what's behind the violence and the reason why he's committing the violence" that is "utterly satisfying and addictive for him".

Drew Goddard felt that television was the best fit for the character, as the writers are "able to do things on the small screen that fit that character better than if we had to water him down for the movies." Petrie and Marco Ramirez talked about creating their version of the character following the film versions, with Ramirez saying, "even if you know the character, you've never seen him like this. That was the big thing we wanted. There are four movies, eight hours and four actors. We've seen this guy. We think we know who he is, but even we learned that he's so much more." Petrie said, "We hope to make people forget what they've seen before, whether they've loved it or not." In order to get in the correct mindset to portray Castle, Bernthal trained with military members, along with receiving weapon training. Bernthal also "had to put myself in as dark of place as possible" to connect with "the emptiness inside" Castle, and isolate himself, including walking across the Brooklyn Bridge to get to set "to shed any outside influence of joy." Rosario Dawson, who felt Matt Murdock behaved like the Punisher in Daredevil season one, felt it would "be really interesting to see how [the writers] differentiate" the two in the second season. Describing the character, Bernthal said, "As a man who put his [life] on the line and really went through the ultimate sacrifice for this country in his involvement in the military. He's a guy who brought the war home with him [in] the worst possible way. There are a lot of iterations of this character and in all of them it's a man who's gone through this unbelievable trauma and what's interesting about our take on him is how this trauma reshapes his own philosophy." Bernthal also talked about the character's 'superpowers', saying, "If I got one thing from the comics, I think, as far as superpowers... his superpower is his rage. His superpower is that he is not going to quit, and he is going to go forward no matter what. And that's as human and grounded a quality as I think as this sort of genre could have".

== In other media ==
Stuntman Eric Linden, who worked on The Punisher as a stunt coordinator, second unit director and Bernthal's stunt double, directed and played the lead role of the Punisher in the 2020 short fan film Skull: Punisher Reawakened, produced in association with FXitinPost.

== Reception ==
=== Accolades ===
Year	Award	Category	Recipient(s)	Result	Ref.
2018	44th Saturn Awards	Best Actor on Television	Jon Bernthal	Nominated	
2019	45th Saturn Awards	Best Actor in Streaming Presentation	Jon Bernthal	Nominated	

== See also ==
- List of Daredevil (TV series) characters
- Characters of the Marvel Cinematic Universe
