= The Punisher (2000 series) =

Comic book series

- Textless cover of The Punisher (2000), #1 (April 2000). Art by Tim Bradstreet.

Publication information
- Publisher: Marvel Comics; Marvel Knights
- Schedule: Monthly
- Format: Limited series
- Genre: Crime
- Publication date: April 2000 – March 2001
- No. of issues: 12
- Main character: Punisher

Creative team
- Written by: Garth Ennis
- Penciller: Steve Dillon
- Inker: Jimmy Palmiotti
- Letterer(s): Comicraft; Wes Abbott; Richard Starkings
- Colorist: Chris Sotomayor
- Editor(s): Jimmy Palmiotti; Joe Quesada

Collected editions
- Welcome Back, Frank: ISBN 0-7851-3384-4

The Punisher (also known as The Punisher: Welcome Back, Frank) is a 12-issue comic book limited series written by Garth Ennis with art by Steve Dillon and Jimmy Palmiotti which was published under the Marvel Knights imprint of Marvel Comics. The series features the vigilante anti-hero the Punisher and ran from April 2000 to March 2001.

== Publication history ==
The series is regarded as the fifth volume of the Punisher title. The story continued in Ennis' 2001 The Punisher ongoing series.

== Issues ==
1. Welcome Back, Frank
2. Badaboom, Badabing
3. The Devil by the Horns
4. Wild Kingdom
5. Even Worse Things
6. Spit Out of Luck
7. Bring Out your Dead
8. Desperate Measures
9. From Russia with Love
10. Glutton for Punishment
11. Any which Way you Can
12. Go Frank Go

== Plot ==
Frank, still depicted as a Vietnam War veteran, reestablishes himself in New York City by taking on the Gnucci crime syndicate. Detective Soap is assigned to "catch" the Punisher; it is purely a P.R. move as the police do not really want Frank caught as they secretly condone his actions. Frank turns the hapless Soap to his side, getting him to pass information on local crime syndicates.

Against his will, Frank gains three loyal friends in his neighbors, Joan the Mouse, Mr. Bumpo, and Spacker Dave. All end up helping him in his crusade against the Gnuccis. Some of this is self-defense as the Gnuccis learn where Frank lives and stage an attack. Spacker himself suffers torture at the hands of the Gnuccis, his piercings ripped out in a fruitless attempt to gain intelligence on Frank.

The Gnucci operation is slowly dismantled. Soap is promoted to police commissioner. As a gesture of thanks for aiding him, Frank gives his neighbors a large sum of Gnucci money. Joan and Spacker would play larger roles in Frank's life later. Bumpo suffers a medical accident ("something important fell out of his bottom") and moves into a hospital.

== Collected editions ==
The series was collected in a trade paperback as The Punisher: Welcome Back, Frank (Marvel, hardcover, ISBN 0-7851-3384-4; softcover, ISBN 0-7851-0783-5; Panini, softcover, ISBN 1-904159-21-4), which became the informal series title.

The series was also collected as Marvel Knights Punisher by Garth Ennis: The Complete Collection Vol. 1 ISBN 9781302914080.

== In other media ==
- Joan, Mr. Bumpo, and Spacker Dave were all portrayed in the 2004 movie The Punisher.
- Another version of the story runs through the 2005 Punisher video game.
