= Punisher in film =

Adaptations of the Punisher in films

The character of Frank Castle as portrayed by four actors in film (L–R): Dolph Lundgren in The Punisher (1989); Thomas Jane in The Punisher (2004); Ray Stevenson in Punisher: War Zone (2008).

The fictional character Frank Castle / The Punisher, a comic book vigilante antihero created by Gerry Conway, John Romita Sr. and Ross Andru and featured in Marvel Comics publications, has appeared as a main character in multiple theatrical, several animated straight-to-video films, and three fan films.

Most notably, he has appeared in two self-titled films, the first in 1989 with Dolph Lundgren in the title role. The second in 2004 with Thomas Jane in the title role. Jane would reprise the role in the 2012 fan film, The Punisher: Dirty Laundry. As well as Punisher: War Zone in 2008, starring Ray Stevenson.

Jon Bernthal has portrayed the Marvel Cinematic Universe version of the character starting in 2015 with the second season of Daredevil after which he headlined two seasons of The Punisher (2017–19). Following the cancellation of Marvel Television's Netflix series, Bernthal would reprise the role for Marvel Studios productions, including the Disney+ series Daredevil: Born Again (2025–present), The Punisher: One Last Kill Marvel Television Special Presentation, and the theatrical film Spider-Man: Brand New Day (both 2026).

== Development ==
The first film, known simply as The Punisher and starring Dolph Lundgren, is a film that was released theatrically internationally but straight to video in North America by Live Entertainment in 1989 that is most notable for lacking the character's signature skull. Marvel hired Jonathan Hensleigh to write and direct the 2004 film, starring Thomas Jane. The film was mainly based on two Punisher comic book stories; The Punisher: Year One and Welcome Back, Frank.

A direct sequel was supposed to follow based on strong DVD sales, but the lack of a good script kept the project in development for over 3 years, and by the end both Jonathan Hensleigh and Thomas Jane pulled out. In June 2007, Lexi Alexander was hired to direct and Ray Stevenson was hired in July to play the Punisher in the newly titled Punisher: War Zone, which became a reboot, and not a sequel to 2004's The Punisher. This is the second time the film series has been rebooted, after the 2004 production rebooted 1989's The Punisher. The film was released on December 5, 2008. The films primarily focus on Frank's vigilante crusade after the death of his family.

== Live-action ==
=== The Punisher (1989) ===
The Punisher appears in a self-titled film released by Live Entertainment, portrayed Dolph Lundgren. This version is described as an unnamed "city's most wanted, and most mysterious, vigilante" and a "one-man weapon against crime" who has killed 125 people in the five years preceding the film's events. Additionally, he is a former police officer, undercover detective, and U.S. Marine whose wife Julie and daughters Annie and Felice Castle were murdered by mobsters via a car bomb meant for him. After being legally declared dead following the incident, Castle establishes a base for him in the labyrinthine sewer system and kills mobsters wherever he finds them. However, his efforts draw the attention of Gianni Franco, a leading mobster who seeks to unite the mob families, and Lady Tanaka of the Yakuza, who kidnaps the mob families' children to force them to submit to their control.

=== Lionsgate–produced films ===
==== The Punisher (2004) ====
The Punisher appears in a self-titled film released by Lions Gate Pictures, portrayed by Thomas Jane. This version is an FBI agent and former soldier who goes on to retire after killing Bobby Saint, son of corrupt businessman Howard Saint. However, Howard retaliates by sending men to slaughter Frank's family amidst a Castle family reunion. Left for dead, burnt out, and haunted by the tragedy, Frank takes up a skull shirt given to him by his son before the latter's death and sets out to avenge his family by killing Howard and his inner circle. In an extended cut of the film, it is revealed Frank's friend Jimmy Weeks (Russell Andrews) sold him out to Howard.

Despite 2004's The Punisher being a box office disappointment, Lions Gate Entertainment was interested in a sequel based on the film's strong DVD sales. Jonathan Hensleigh and Thomas Jane were set to commence filming of the sequel, but the project remained in development hell for over 3 years due to the lack of a good script despite numerous writers being attached even after Hensleigh pulled out. Thomas Jane was so eager to do the sequel starring Jigsaw as the villain, that he'd put on an additional 12 pounds of muscle, and that "it would be darker, bloodier and more unfriendly than the first one." However, after reading the new script by Kurt Sutter, he stated, "What I won't do is spend months of my life sweating over a movie that I just don't believe in. I've always loved the Marvel guys and wish them well. Meanwhile, I'll continue to search for a film that one day might stand with all those films that the fans have asked me to watch."

===== Cancelled The Punisher sequel =====
Lions Gate Entertainment planned to produce a direct sequel titled The Punisher 2, with Avi Arad, chairman and CEO of Marvel Studios, stating that the second film would "become the fifth Marvel property to become a sequel." Jonathan Hensleigh said that he was interested in working with Thomas Jane again for The Punisher 2. Jane said that the villain for The Punisher 2 would be Jigsaw. The project lingered in development for over three years. Jonathan Hensleigh completed a first draft of the script before pulling out around 2006. John Dahl was in talks to direct the film but pulled out due to script quality issues and the studio not wanting to spend a lot of money on the project. Rob Zombie was also considered to direct the sequel. In a statement on May 15, 2007, and in two audio interviews Thomas Jane said that he pulled out of the project due to creative differences and the budget of the film being cut, in addition to director Walter Hill being turned down as director by Lionsgate. After reading the new script by Kurt Sutter, Jane stated:

What I won't do is spend months of my life sweating over a movie that I just don't believe in. I've always loved the Marvel guys, and wish them well. Meanwhile, I'll continue to search for a film that one day might stand with all those films that the fans have asked me to watch.

In June 2007, it was reported announced that Lexi Alexander replaced Dahl as director, and that actor Ray Stevenson would replace Thomas Jane in the title role. The Punisher 2 then became Punisher: War Zone,

==== Punisher: War Zone (2008) ====
The Punisher appears in Punisher: War Zone, portrayed by Ray Stevenson. This version is a former Force Recon Marine who has operated as the Punisher for five years. After inadvertently killing an undercover FBI agent while assaulting a mob dinner, he attempts to atone for his mistake and threatens to quit vigilantism over his partner Microchip's protests. Amidst this, he must also contend with the FBI's "Punisher Task Force" and Billy "The Beaut" Russoti / Jigsaw, a survivor of the mob dinner who seeks to recruit an army to get revenge on Frank.

Stevenson had expressed interest in sequels, hinting at Barracuda as a possible villain. At the 2008 San Diego Comic-Con, when asked if he signed on for more Punisher, he said, "If I had my wish, it's going to run and run. It's up to the fan base. If this works, we get to do it all again." After War Zone was not received well by audiences, the rights for the character eventually reverted to Marvel.

Stevenson would later reprise his role as Castle / The Punisher in The Super Hero Squad Show (2009).

=== Marvel Cinematic Universe ===
In September 2014, Director duo, Anthony and Joe Russo indicated that the Punisher had two cameo appearances in their feature film Captain America: The Winter Soldier (2014), as a Penske truck driver who runs over two different Hydra agents. The Russos also expressed interest in a Marvel One-Shot being produced about the character.

In February 2020, Adam G. Simon stated that he had previously pitched a The Punisher film to Marvel Studios that would be set in the Marvel Cinematic Universe (MCU), after the events of the Netflix television series of the same name, with Jon Bernthal reprising his role, described as "Falling Down by way of Full Metal Jacket":

"You got to let this thing live in R-Rated territory and it has to have the same grit and unapologetic boldness of Logan. In my take, we find Frank Castle as we left him at the end of the series, only now completely aware of the threat that superheroes and villains pose to mankind. So, Frank Castle has to go gunning for the person who he feels is responsible for the innumerable civilian casualties. The one who started it all by organizing these weapons of mass destruction to come together. Nick Fury. The twist is that Frank is being used, he spots the double-cross early at the end of act one. From that point on, we have a 3:10 to Yuma situation. Frank and Fury on the run from everyone, heroes and villains. It's 3:10 to Yuma meets Léon: The Professional by way of Winter Soldier."

==== Spider-Man: Brand New Day (2026) ====
In July 2026, Bernthal reprised his role as Castle / The Punisher in the film Spider-Man: Brand New Day.

== Animation ==
=== Madhouse–produced films ===
==== Iron Man: Rise of Technovore (2013) ====
The Punisher appears in Iron Man: Rise of Technovore, voiced by Norman Reedus.

==== Avengers Confidential: Black Widow & Punisher (2014) ====
The Punisher appears in Avengers Confidential: Black Widow & Punisher, voiced by Brian Bloom. He is apprehended by S.H.I.E.L.D. after interfering with one of their missions, but is offered to work with Black Widow to stop Leviathan in exchange for his release.

== Cast and crew ==
=== Principal cast ===
List indicators
- This table only shows characters that have appeared in three or more films in the series.
- A dark grey cell indicates that the character was not in the film or that the character's presence in the film has yet to be announced.
- A ^{V} indicates a voice-only role.

Character
Character	The Punisher	Lionsgate–produced films	
Character	The Punisher	The Punisher	Punisher: War Zone
Character	1989	2004	2008
Francis "Frank" Castle The Punisher	Dolph Lundgren	Thomas Jane	Ray Stevenson
Maria Castle	Photograph	Samantha Mathis	Photograph
Danny / Will Castle	Robert Simper	Marcus Johns	
Bumpo		John Pinette	
Frank Castle Sr.		Roy Scheider	
Spacker Dave		Ben Foster	
Mickey Duka		Eddie Jemison	
Quentin Glass		Will Patton	
Joan		Rebecca Romijn	
The Russian		Kevin Nash	
Howard Saint		John Travolta	
Livia Saint		Laura Harring	
Robert "Bobby" Saint		James Carpinello	
John Saint		James Carpinello	
Paul Budiansky			Colin Salmon
Angela Donatelli			Julie Benz
Grace Donatelli			Stephanie Janusauskas
Linus Lieberman Microchip			Wayne Knight
Billy "The Beaut" Russoti Jigsaw			Dominic West
James "Loony Bin Jim" Russoti			Doug Hutchison
Martin Soap			Dash Mihok

=== Madhouse–produced films (2013–14) ===
Character
Character	Iron Man: Rise of Technovore	Avengers Confidential: Black Widow & Punisher
Character	2013	2014
Francis "Frank" Castle The Punisher	Tesshô Genda^{V}	Tesshô Genda^{V}
Francis "Frank" Castle The Punisher	Norman Reedus^{V}	Brian Bloom^{V}
Natasha Romanova Black Widow	Miyuki Sawashiro^{V}	Miyuki Sawashiro^{V}
Natasha Romanova Black Widow	Clare Grant^{V}	Jennifer Carpenter^{V}
Tony Stark Iron Man	Keiji Fujiwara^{V}	Keiji Fujiwara^{V}
Tony Stark Iron Man	Matthew Mercer^{V}	Matthew Mercer^{V}
Introduced in Iron Man: Rise of Technovore
Clint Barton Hawkeye	Shūhei Sakaguchi^{V}	Shūhei Sakaguchi^{V}
Clint Barton Hawkeye	Troy Baker^{V}	Matthew Mercer^{V}
Nick Fury	Hideaki Tezuka^{V}	Hideaki Tezuka^{V}
Nick Fury	John Eric Bentley^{V}	John Eric Bentley^{V}
Sasha Hammer	Houko Kuwashima^{V}	
Sasha Hammer	Tara Platt^{V}	
Maria Hill	Junko Minagawa^{V}	Junko Minagawa^{V}
Maria Hill	Kari Wahlgren^{V}	Kari Wahlgren^{V}
J.A.R.V.I.S.	Yasuyuki Kase^{V}	
J.A.R.V.I.S.	Troy Baker^{V}	
Pepper Potts	Hiroe Oka	
Pepper Potts	Kate Higgins	
James "Rhodey" Rhodes War Machine	Hiroki Yasumoto^{V}	Silent cameo
James "Rhodey" Rhodes War Machine	James C. Mathis III^{V}	Silent cameo
Obadiah Stane	Takaya Hashi^{V}	
Obadiah Stane	JB Blanc^{V}	
Ezekiel Stane	Miyu Irino^{V}	
Ezekiel Stane	Eric Bauza^{V}	
Introduced in Avengers Confidential: Black Widow & Punisher
Bruce Banner The Hulk		Yuichi Karasuma^{V}
Bruce Banner The Hulk		Fred Tatasciore^{V}
Cain		Ryūzaburō Ōtomo^{V}
Cain		Kyle Hebert^{V}
Amadeus Cho		Daisuke Namikawa^{V}
Amadeus Cho		Eric Bauza^{V}
Orion		Masashi Sugawara^{V}
Orion		JB Blanc^{V}
Ren		Hisashi Izumi^{V}
Ren		Fred Tatasciore^{V}
Elihas Starr Egghead		Hiroki Tōchi^{V}
Elihas Starr Egghead		Grant George^{V}
Count Nefaria		Silent cameo
Carol Danvers Captain Marvel		Silent cameo
Graviton		Silent cameo
Griffin		Silent cameo
Grim Reaper		Silent cameo
Taskmaster		Silent cameo
Thor		Silent cameo
Baron Helmut Zemo		Silent cameo

=== Marvel Cinematic Universe (2026–present) ===
Character	Phase Six	
Character	The Punisher: One Last Kill	Spider-Man: Brand New Day
Character	2026	2026
Francis "Frank" Castle Sr. The Punisher	Jon Bernthal	Jon Bernthal
Introduced in Marvel's Netflix television series
Lisa Castle	TBA	
Curtis Hoyle	Jason R. Moore	
Matt Murdock Daredevil		Charlie Cox
Introduced in the Marvel Cinematic Universe
Bruce Banner Hulk		Mark Ruffalo
Mac Gargan Scorpion		Michael Mando
Ned Leeds		Jacob Batalon
Peter Parker Spider-Man		Tom Holland
Michelle "MJ" Jones-Watson		Zendaya
Introduced in The Punisher: One Last Kill
Charli	Mila Jaymes	
Dennis	Roe Rancell	
Ma Gnucci	TBA	
Introduced in Spider-Man: Brand New Day
Jean Grey		Sadie Sink
Jean DeWolff		Liza Colón-Zayas

=== Additional crew ===
Role	The Punisher	Lionsgate–produced films		Madhouse–prouduced films		Marvel Cinematic Universe
Role	The Punisher	The Punisher	Punisher: War Zone	Iron Man: Rise of Technovore	Avengers Confidential: Black Widow & Punisher	Spider-Man: Brand New Day
Role	1989	2004	2008	2013	2014	2026
Director(s)	Mark Goldblatt	Jonathan Hensleigh	Lexi Alexander	Hiroshi Hamasaki	Kenichi Shimizu	Destin Daniel Cretton
Producer(s)	Robert Mark Kamen	Avi Arad; Gale Anne Hurd	Gale Anne Hurd	—N/a	Taro Morishima	Kevin Feige; Amy Pascal
Writer(s)	Boaz Yakin	Jonathan Hensleigh; Michael France	Nick Santora; Art Marcum and Matt Holloway	Kengo Kaji	Mitsutaka Hirota; Marjorie Liu	Chris McKenna; Erik Sommers
Composer	Dennis Dreith	Carlo Siliotto	Michael Wandmacher	Tetsuya Takahashi	Tetsuya Takahashi	TBA
Cinematographer	Ian Baker	Conrad W. Hall	Steve Gainer	—N/a	—N/a	Brett Pawlak
Editor	Stephanie Flack; Tim Wellburn	Steven Kemper; Jeff Gullo	Paul Norling	TBA	TBA	TBA
Production company	Carolco Pictures; New World Pictures	Lionsgate Films	Lionsgate Films	Madhouse; Marvel Entertainment	Madhouse; Marvel Entertainment	Columbia Pictures; Marvel Studios; Pascal Pictures
Production company	Carolco Pictures; New World Pictures	Marvel Entertainment	Marvel Knights; Valhalla Motion Pictures; MHF Zweite Academy Film; SGF Entertainment Inc.	Madhouse; Marvel Entertainment	Madhouse; Marvel Entertainment	Columbia Pictures; Marvel Studios; Pascal Pictures
Distributor	Live Entertainment; New World International	Lionsgate Films	Lionsgate Films	Sony Pictures Home Entertainment; Sony Pictures Entertainment Japan		Sony Pictures Releasing
Distributor	Live Entertainment; New World International	Summit Entertainment; Columbia TriStar Film Distributors International	Sony Pictures Releasing	Sony Pictures Home Entertainment; Sony Pictures Entertainment Japan		Sony Pictures Releasing
Running time	89 minutes	123 minutes	103 minutes	88 minutes	83 minutes	TBA
Release date	October 5, 1989 (West Germany); April 25, 1991 (United States)	April 16, 2004	December 5, 2008	April 24, 2013 (Japan)	March 25, 2014 (North America); September 3, 2014 (Japan)	July 31, 2026

== Reception ==
=== Box office performance ===
Film	Release date		Box office gross			Reference
Film	United States	Other territories	United States	Other territories	Worldwide	Reference
The Punisher (1989)	April 25, 1991	October 5, 1989		Not disclosed in gross	Not disclosed in gross	
The Punisher (2004)	April 16, 2004	May 5, 2004	$33,810,189	$20,889,916	$54,700,105	
Punisher: War Zone (2008)	December 5, 2008	December 3, 2008	$8,050,977	$2,110,516	$10,161,493	

=== Critical response ===
Critical and public response of Punisher in film
Film	Critical		Public
Film	Rotten Tomatoes	Metacritic	CinemaScore
The Punisher (1989)	25% (16 reviews)	63 (4 reviews)	—N/a
The Punisher (2004)	30% (169 reviews)	33 (36 reviews)	B+
Punisher: War Zone	29% (111 reviews)	30 (24 reviews)	B−

== Unofficial fan films ==
=== Do Not Fall in New York City (2012) ===
An animated Punisher fan film titled Do Not Fall in New York City was released in 2012, with Lee Westwood voicing the eponymous character.

=== The Punisher: Dirty Laundry (2012) ===
At the 2012 San Diego Comic-Con, Jane debuted an independently financed Punisher short film, serving as an unofficial sequel directed by Phil Joanou, written by Chad St. John, produced by Adi Shankar, and co-starring Ron Perlman, titled Dirty Laundry. Jane said, "I wanted to make a fan film for a character I've always loved and believed in – a love letter to Frank Castle & his fans. It was an incredible experience with everyone on the project throwing in their time just for the fun of it. It's been a blast to be a part of from start to finish — we hope the friends of Frank enjoy watching it as much as we did making it."

=== Skull (2020) ===
Stuntman Eric Linden, who worked on the MCU / Netflix series The Punisher as a stunt coordinator, second unit director, and stunt double for Jon Bernthal, directed and portrayed the Punisher in the short film Skull, produced in association with FXitinPost.
