= Valhalla Entertainment =

American television and film production company

Valhalla Entertainment Productions, Inc.
- Formerly: Pacific Western Productions (1982–1998); Valhalla Motion Pictures (1998–2017)
- Type: Private
- Industry: Film; Television
- Founded: 1982; 44 years ago (as Pacific Western Productions); 1998; 28 years ago (as Valhalla Motion Pictures); 2017; 9 years ago (as Valhalla Entertainment)
- Founder: Gale Anne Hurd
- Headquarters: West Hollywood, California, Los Angeles, United States
- Key people: Gale Anne Hurd

Valhalla Entertainment Productions, Inc., formerly known as Pacific Western Productions and Valhalla Motion Pictures, is an American film and television production company founded by producer Gale Anne Hurd in 1982. Their productions include AMC's The Walking Dead television series, its companion series, Fear the Walking Dead, and the spin-off, The Walking Dead: World Beyond.

== History ==
Formerly Pacific Western Productions, the company was founded by producer Gale Anne Hurd in 1982, and it was folded into Valhalla Motion Pictures in 2000.

After the success of Aliens, Hurd signed a deal with 20th Century Fox and partnered with James Cameron to launch an independent film production label, Tech Noir, which was a predecessor to the later Lightstorm Entertainment. In 1988, Gale Anne Hurd launched a label No Frills Film, devoted to producing lower budget and independent films, usually with the nature of B-movie.

In 1990, Hurd signed a production deal with Universal Pictures. In 1993, No Frills Film was merged into Pacific Western Productions. Also that year, the company signed a first-look deal with Paramount Pictures.

Five years later, Gale Anne Hurd formed another production label, Valhalla Motion Pictures, which was ultimately merged with Pacific Western Productions in 2000. The same year it signed a first-look deal with Kinowelt USA, which was acquired by StudioCanal after Kinowelt was forced into bankruptcy.

In 2001, Valhalla Motion Pictures launched a television division that its main focus was on producing television shows and movies for networks and syndication.

Valhalla had an overall deal with Universal Cable Productions to develop new television and digital programs, which was renewed in 2015. Valhalla produced USA Network's drama series, Falling Water, and Amazon's original series, Lore.

In the comic book industry, Valhalla has created a six-issue mini-series comic book, The Scourge, for Aspen Comics, and a four-issue comic book mini-series, ANTI, for 12 Gauge Comics. Dead Man's Run, which was created for Aspen Comics by Greg Pak.

On February 7, 2017, Valhalla Motion Pictures merged into Valhalla Entertainment, which was originally formed in 1996.

== Filmography ==
=== Films ===
Year	Film	Details				
Year	Film	Director(s)	Writer(s)	Distributor(s)	Budget(s)	Gross
1984	The Terminator	James Cameron	James Cameron and Gale Anne Hurd	Orion Pictures	$6.4 million	$78.3 million
1986	Aliens	James Cameron	Story by: James Cameron and David Giler and Walter Hill; Screenplay by: James Cameron; Based on characters by: Dan O'Bannon and Ronald Shusett	20th Century Fox	$17–18 million	$131.3–183.3 million
1988	Bad Dreams	Andrew Fleming	Story by: Andrew Fleming and Michael Dick and P.J. Pettiette and Yuri Zeltser; Screenplay by: Andrew Fleming and Steven E. de Souza	20th Century Fox	$4.5 million	$9.8 million
1988	Alien Nation	Graham Bake	Rocknee S. O'Bannon	20th Century Fox	$16 million	$32.2 million
1989	The Abyss	James Cameron		20th Century Fox	$43–47 million	$89.8 million
1990	Downtown	Richard Benjamin	Nat Mauldin	20th Century Fox	$10 million	$2.34 million
1990	Tremors	Ron Underwood	Story by: Brent Maddock and S.S. Wilson and Ron Underwood; Screenplay by: Brent Maddock and S.S. Wilson	Universal Studios	$11 million	$16 million
1991	Terminator 2: Judgment Day	James Cameron	James Cameron and William Wisher Jr.	TriStar Pictures	$94 million	$523.7 million
1992	The Waterdance	Neal Jimenez and Michael Steinberg	Neal Jimenez	The Samuel Goldwyn Company	TBA	$1.7 million
1992	Raising Cain	Brian De Palma		Universal Studios	$12 million	$37 million
1994	No Escape	Martin Campbell	Michael Gaylin and Joel Gross	Savoy Pictures (US & UK); Columbia Pictures (International)	$20 million	$15.3 million
1994	Safe Passage	Robert Allan Ackerman	Deena Goldstone	New Line Cinema	TBA	$1.6 million
1996	The Ghost and the Darkness	Stephen Hopkins	William Goldman	Paramount Pictures	$55 million	$75 million
1997	The Relic	Peter Hyams	Amy Holden Jones and John Raffo and Rick Jaffa & Amanda Silver	Paramount Pictures (US); Universal Studios (international)	$60 million	$48 million
1997	Dante's Peak	Roger Donaldson	Leslie Bohem	Universal Studios	$116 million	$178.1 million
1997	Switchback	Jeb Stuart		Paramount Pictures	$38 million	$6.5 million
1998	Armageddon	Michael Bay	Story by: Robert Roy Pool and Jonathan Hensleigh; Screenplay by: Jonathan Hensleigh and Tony Gilroy and Shane Salerno and J. J. Abrams	Buena Vista Pictures	$140 million	$553.7 million
1998	Dead Man on Campus	Alan Cohn	Story by: Anthony Abrams and Adam Larson Broder; Screenplay by: Michael Traeger and Mike White	Paramount Pictures	$14 million	$15 million
1999	Virus	John Bruno	Dennis Feldman and Chuck Pfarrer	Universal Studios	$75 million	$30.7 million
1999	Dick	Andrew Fleming	Andrew Fleming and Sheryl Longin	Columbia Pictures	$13 million	$6.3 million
2002	Clockstoppers	Jonathan Frakes	Story by: Rob Hedden and Andy Hedden and J. David Stem and David N. Weiss; Screenplay by: Rob Hedden and J. David Stem and David N. Weiss	Paramount Pictures	$26 million	$38.8 million
2003	Hulk	Ang Lee	Story by: James Schamus; Screenplay by: James Schamus and Michael France and John Turman	Universal Studios	$137 million	$245.4 million
2004	The Punisher	Jonathan Hensleigh	Jonathan Hensleigh and Michael France	Lionsgate Films (US & Canada); Columbia Pictures (International)	$33 million	$54.7 million
2005	Æon Flux	Karyn Kusama	Phil Hay and Matt Manfredi	Paramount Pictures	$65 million	$52.3 million
2007	Welcome to the Jungle	Jonathan Hensleigh		Dimension Films	200,000	TBA
2008	The Incredible Hulk	Louis Leterrier	Zak Penn (Note: Despite reportedly working extensively on the script, the Writers Guild of America decided not to credit Edward Norton as a writer, only crediting Penn, arguing Norton had not dramatically changed Penn's script.)	Universal Studios	$150 million	$263.4 million
2008	Punisher: War Zone	Lexi Alexander	Art Marcum & Matt Holloway and Nick Santora	Lionsgate Films	$35 million	$10.1 million
2018	Hell Fest	Gregory Plotkin	Story by: William Penick and Christopher Sey and Stephen Susco; Screenplay by: Seth M. Sherwood and Blair Butler and Akela Cooper	CBS Films; Lionsgate Films	$5.5 million	$17.5 million

=== Comic books ===
Year	Comic book(s)	Details				
Year	Comic book(s)	Publisher(s)	Writer(s)	Artist(s)	Issue(s)	Reference(s)
2010–2011	The Scourge	Aspen Comics	Scott Lobdell	Eric Battle	6	
2011–2013	Dead Man's Run	Aspen Comics	Greg Pak	Tony Parker	7	
2012–2013	ANTI	12 Gauge Comics	Peter Calloway	Brian Stelfreeze	4	

=== Documentaries ===
Year	Documentary film	Details		
Year	Documentary film	Director(s)	Writer(s)	Distributor(s)
2002	True Whispers: The Story of the Navajo Code Talkers	Valerie Red-Horse		PBS
2010	Choctaw Code Talkers	Valerie Red-Horse		Native American Public Telecommunications
2017	Mankiller	Valerie Red-Horse		PBS
2022	The YouTube Effect	Alex Winter		Kanopy; Drafthouse Films

=== Television ===
==== Television shows ====
Year	Show	Details				
Year	Show	Creator(s)	Network(s)	Distributor(s)	Season(s)	Episodes
2002–2003	Adventure Inc.	Ethlie Ann Vare	Syndication	Tribune Entertainment	1	22
2010–2022	The Walking Dead	Based on The Walking Dead by: Robert Kirkman and Tony Moore and Charlie Adlard; Developed by: Frank Darabont	AMC	AMC Networks	11	177
2015–2023	Fear the Walking Dead	Based on The Walking Dead by: Robert Kirkman and Tony Moore and Charlie Adlard; Developed by: Robert Kirkman and Dave Erickson	AMC	AMC Networks	8	113
2016	Hunters	Based on Alien Hunter by: Whitley Strieber; Developed by: Natalie Chaidez	Syfy	NBCUniversal Television Distribution	1	13
2016–2018	Falling Water	Henry Bromell and Blake Masters	USA Network	NBCUniversal Television Distribution	2	20
2017–2018	Lore	Based on the Lore podcast by: Aaron Mahnke; Developed by: Aaron Mahnke and Gale Anne Hurd and Ben Silverman and Howard Owens	Amazon Prime Video	Amazon Studios	2	12
2020–2021	The Walking Dead: World Beyond	Based on The Walking Dead by: Robert Kirkman and Tony Moore and Charlie Adlard; Developed by: Scott M. Gimple and Matthew Negrete	AMC	AMC Networks	2	20
2022	Tales of the Walking Dead	Based on The Walking Dead by: Robert Kirkman and Tony Moore and Charlie Adlard; Developed by: Scott M. Gimple and Channing Powell	AMC	AMC Networks	1	6
2023–present	The Walking Dead: Dead City	Based on The Walking Dead by: Robert Kirkman and Tony Moore and Charlie Adlard; Developed by: Eli Jorné	AMC	AMC Networks	1	6
2023–present	The Walking Dead: Daryl Dixon	Based on The Walking Dead by: Robert Kirkman and Tony Moore and Charlie Adlard; Developed by: David Zabel	AMC	AMC Networks	1	6
2024	The Walking Dead: The Ones Who Live	Based on The Walking Dead by: Robert Kirkman and Tony Moore and Charlie Adlard; Developed by: Scott M. Gimple, Danai Gurira and Andrew Lincoln	AMC	AMC Networks	1	6

==== Television films ====
Year	Television movie		Details		
Year	Television movie	Director(s)	Writer(s)	Network(s)	Distributor(s)
1991	Cast a Deadly Spell	Martin Campbell	Joseph Dougherty	HBO	
1994	Witch Hunt	Paul Schrader	Joseph Dougherty	HBO	
1995	Sugartime	John N. Smith	Written by: Martyn Burke; Suggested by the book Roemer: Man Against the Mob by: William F. Roemer Jr.	HBO	
2010	The Wronged Man	Tom McLoughlin	Based on the magazine article by: Andrew Corsello; Written by: Teena Booth	Lifetime Movie Network	Sony Pictures Television
2011	Last Man Standing	Ernest Dickerson	Jolene Rice and Adam Beason	Lifetime Television	Sony Pictures Television

== Logo ==
On March 24, 2016, the United States Patent and Trademark Office denied a trademark registration by Valhalla Game Studios on the grounds there was likelihood of confusion between Valhalla Motion Pictures and Valhalla Games Studios' mark.
