= Gary M. Hymes =

Gary Hymes is an American stuntman, second unit director, and film actor.

== Life and career ==
Hymes's son (Collin) was involved in a stunt during the filming of The Untouchables as an infant.

In 2025, Hymes won the AMA District 37 Desert motorcycle Racing Championship in the Legend Class and, in a rare feat, also won the Hare and Hound, Sprint Enduro, and European Scrambles Championships that year. Hymes is also a member of the renowned Checkers Motorcycle Club, which has a prestigious 75-year history. He has appeared on the cover of numerous major motorcycle racing publications.

Hymes has served as stunt coordinator on the first two Jurassic Park films, as well as serving as second unit director (uncredited) on the first one.

In 1994, Hymes served as stunt coordinator on the film Speed under the direction of Jan De Bont. Hymes, along with stunt performers, Brian Smrz, Jimmy Ortega, Edward "Eddie" Matthews, and William Morts, won "Best Stunt Ensemble" at the Awards Circuit Community Awards.

He has also worked on the TV show ER, which aired on NBC from 1994 to 2009. In 2007, Hymes was nominated at the 59th Primetime Emmy Awards in the category "Outstanding Stunt Coordination". He has also won the Taurus World Stunt Award for "Best Stunt Coordinator and/or Second unit Director" for the film "Fast and Furious 5" .

Hymes served as second unit director and stunt coordinator on The Punisher for Jonathan Hensleigh. For his work on the film, he was nominated at the Taurus World Stunt Awards in the category of "Best Stunt Coordinator or 2nd Unit Director".

Other films Hymes has served as second unit director on include Pineapple Express, The Flintstones, Yes Man, Alex Cross, Mike and Dave Need Wedding Dates, Broken Arrow, and Bless the Child.

== Filmography ==
Year	Title	Stunts	Second unit director	Director
1982	Megaforce	Yes	No	Hal Needham
1983	Scarface	Yes	No	Brian De Palma
1984	The Adventures of Buckaroo Banzai Across the 8th Dimension	Yes	No	W. D. Richter
1985	To Live and Die in L.A.	Yes	No	William Friedkin
1986	Back to School	Yes	No	Alan Metter
1987	The Untouchables	Yes	No	Brian De Palma
1988	Shoot to Kill	Yes	No	Roger Spottiswoode
1988	Police Academy 5: Assignment Miami Beach	Yes	No	Alan Myerson
1988	The Blob	Yes	No	Chuck Russell
1989	Loverboy	Yes	Yes	Joan Micklin Silver
1989	K-9	Yes	No	Rod Daniel
1990	Tango & Cash	Yes	No	Andrei Konchalovsky and Albert Magnoli
1990	Internal Affairs	Yes	Yes	Mike Figgis
1990	The Bonfire of the Vanities	Yes	No	Brian De Palma
1991	One Good Cop	Yes	Yes	Heywood Gould
1992	Toys	Yes	No	Barry Levinson
1993	Jurassic Park	Yes	Yes	Steven Spielberg
1993	Addams Family Values	Yes	No	Barry Sonnenfeld
1994	The Flintstones	Yes	Yes	Brian Levant
1994	Speed	Yes	No	Jan De Bont
1996	Broken Arrow	Yes	Yes	John Woo
1997	For Richer or Poorer	Yes	Yes	Bryan Spicer
1997	The Lost World: Jurassic Park	Yes	No	Steven Spielberg
1998	Black Dog	Yes	Yes	Kevin Hooks
1999	Bowfinger	Yes	No	Frank Oz
1999	The Out-of-Towners	No	Yes	Sam Weisman
2000	Bless the Child	No	Yes	Chuck Russell
2001	The One	Yes	Yes	James Wong
2001	What's The Worst That Could Happen?	No	Yes	Sam Weisman
2003	The Italian Job	Yes	No	F. Gary Gray
2004	The Punisher	Yes	Yes	Jonathan Hensleigh
2005	Batman Begins	Yes	No	Christopher Nolan
2006	Stick It	Yes	Yes	Jessica Bendinger
2007	Urban Justice	Yes	No	Don E. FauntLeRoy
2008	Pineapple Express	Yes	Yes	David Gordon Green
2008	Wanted	No	Yes	Timur Bekmambetov
2008	Yes Man	Yes	Yes	Peyton Reed
2009	Observe and Report	Yes	Yes	Jody Hill
2009	Beyond Reasonable Doubt	Yes	Yes	Peter Hyams
2009	Funny People	Yes	No	Judd Apatow
2010	The Town	Yes	No	Ben Affleck
2011	Horrible Bosses	No	Yes	Seth Gordon
2011	Fast Five	Yes	No	Justin Lin
2012	Argo	Yes	No	Ben Affleck
2012	Seven Psychopaths	Yes	No	Martin McDonagh
2012	Alex Cross	Yes	Yes	Rob Cohen
2013	Gangster Squad	Yes	No	Ruben Fleischer
2013	Identity Thief	Yes	Yes	Seth Gordon
2013	Iron Man 3	Yes	No	Shane Black
2013	The Hangover Part III	Yes	No	Todd Phillips
2014	Ride Along	Yes	No	Tim Story
2015	Terminator Genisys	Yes	No	Alan Taylor
2015	Ant-Man	Yes	No	Peyton Reed
2015	Straight Outta Compton	Yes	No	F. Gary Gray
2016	War Dogs	Yes	No	Todd Phillips
2016	Mike and Dave Need Wedding Dates	Yes	Yes	Jake Szymanski
2016	Ride Along 2	Yes	No	Tim Story
2017	Logan	Yes	No	James Mangold
2017	Jumanji: Welcome to the Jungle	Yes	No	Jake Kasdan
