= The Punisher (2004 film) =

Film by Jonathan Hensleigh

- Theatrical release poster
- Directed by: Jonathan Hensleigh
- Written by: Jonathan Hensleigh; Michael France
- Based on: Punisher by Marvel Comics
- Produced by: Avi Arad; Gale Anne Hurd
- Starring: Thomas Jane (Note: Credited onscreen as "Tom Jane"); John Travolta; Will Patton; Roy Scheider; Laura Harring; Ben Foster; Rebecca Romijn-Stamos
- Cinematography: Conrad W. Hall
- Edited by: Steven Kemper; Jeff Gullo
- Music by: Carlo Siliotto
- Production companies: Marvel Enterprises; Valhalla Motion Pictures; Film & Entertainment VIP Medienfonds 2 GMBH & Co. KG; Film & Entertainment VIP Medienfonds 3 GMBH & Co. KG; Artisan Entertainment (Note: Later billing blocks replaces their name with Lions Gate Films, who purchased Artisan during the film's post-production.)
- Distributed by: Lions Gate Films (United States) (Note: Credited onscreen as "Lions Gate Entertainment"); Columbia TriStar Film Distributors International (International)
- Release date: April 16, 2004
- Running time: 123 minutes
- Countries: Germany; United States
- Language: English
- Budget: $33 million
- Box office: $54.7 million

The Punisher is a 2004 vigilante action film based on the Marvel Comics character the Punisher. It was directed by Jonathan Hensleigh, who co-wrote the film with Michael France. The film stars Thomas Jane as the eponymous antihero who seeks revenge against Howard Saint (John Travolta), a crime boss who ordered the deaths of the former's family.

The film's plot was mainly inspired by two Punisher comic book stories: the 1994 miniseries The Punisher: Year One, by writers Dan Abnett and Andy Lanning, and the 2000–01 miniseries Welcome Back, Frank, by writer Garth Ennis. Screenwriter Jonathan Hensleigh agreed to direct the film during its development stage, despite a dispute with Marvel Enterprises, marking his directorial debut. The Punisher was shot on location in Tampa, Florida, and environs in mid-to-late 2003. Artisan Entertainment, which released the 1989 Punisher film in the United States, produced the film, while Lions Gate Entertainment, who purchased Artisan during post-production, served as the American distributor.

The Punisher was released on April 16, 2004 by Lions Gate Films in the United States, with Columbia TriStar Film Distributors International releasing in other territories. It received generally negative reviews and grossed $13 million in the United States over its opening weekend; it reached a total gross of $54.7 million against a budget of $33 million. Marvel and Lions Gate began development on a sequel, which instead became the 2008 reboot Punisher: War Zone after Jane and Hensleigh left the project due to creative differences.

== Plot ==
An FBI bust of a smuggling operation in Tampa results in the deaths of Bobby Saint, the son of mafia boss Howard Saint, and Otto Krieg, an arms dealer. However, Krieg's death was faked, and he is later revealed to be undercover FBI agent Frank Castle, who is on his final mission before retirement. Enraged at the death of his son, Saint orders his men to learn everything they can about Krieg and acquires access by bribing corrupt federal law enforcement officers for his federal service history.

Saint orders Castle to be killed at a family reunion in Puerto Rico, though Saint's wife Livia insists that Castle's family be killed as well. At the reunion, Saint's men, including Saint's best friend Quentin Glass and Bobby's older brother John, kill Castle's entire family. Though Frank Castle Sr. takes down a multitude of the attackers, John then beats and shoots Castle, leaving him for dead. Castle survives, though, and is nursed back to health by Candelaria, a local fisherman. With the police and FBI unwilling to pursue the killers due to Saint's power and influence, Castle moves into an abandoned apartment occupied by three outcasts—Joan, Bumpo, and Spacker Dave—and begins his mission to bring the Saints down.

With the help of information provided by Saint's more friendly henchman Mickey Duka, who volunteers to become Castle's inside man due to their shared hatred of the Saints, Castle studies the Saint family and learns their every move, during which he discovers Glass to be a closeted homosexual. Castle openly attacks Saint's business and sabotages his partnership with his Cuban partners by destroying boat shipments of their laundered cash. Saint discovers that Castle is alive and sends assassins to kill him. The first assassin, Harry Heck, ambushes Castle on a bridge but is killed when Castle fires a ballistic knife into his throat, and Frank decides to take Heck's car as a prize. The second assassin, the Russian, nearly beats Castle to death in his own apartment, but Castle manages to kill him, as well.

The tenants treat Castle's wounds and hide him in his hidden elevator as Saint's men arrive for him. When Dave and Bumpo refuse to reveal Castle's hideout, Glass tortures Dave by plucking each of his piercings with pliers, but still gets no answers. They leave one of their men to intercept Castle, but Castle kills him after they leave. With Mickey's help, Castle poses as an anonymous blackmailer and arranges for Glass to be at certain places while planting Livia's car in the same location and ultimately placing one of Livia's earrings in Glass's bed. When Saint finds the earring, he stabs Glass to death. Livia is confronted about the supposedly existing affair with Quentin, and, despite her protest that Glass was gay, Howard is steadfast as he throws Livia off an overpass onto a railroad track, where she is run over by a train.

With Saint despondent, Castle attacks Saint's club Saints and Sinners and kills every member of his mob, including John. Howard escapes the building despite being wounded. Castle pursues him and shoots him in a duel. As Saint lies dying, Castle reveals his schemes that led Saint to kill his friend and wife. Castle ties Saint to a car and sends it into the club's parking lot, which is rigged with explosives. Saint perishes in the ensuing explosion. Castle returns home and prepares to kill himself with his mission fulfilled, but decides to continue to fight crime after seeing a vision of his wife. Castle leaves some of Saint's money as a farewell gift to the tenants for protecting him and is then seen standing alone on the Sunshine Skyway Bridge at sunset.

In a voiceover, Castle assumes the new identity of Punisher and vows to kill any criminal who harms innocent people in any way.

== Cast ==
- Thomas Jane as Frank Castle Jr./ the Punisher, a former FBI agent turned vigilante after his family was massacred in a mob hit
- John Travolta as Howard Saint, a violent crime lord based in Tampa, responsible for the massacre of Frank's Family
- Will Patton as Quentin Glass, Saint's consigliere
- Rebecca Romijn as Joan, a waitress who shared a building with Frank
- Ben Foster as Spacker Dave, a high school dropout who shared a building with Frank
- John Pinette as Bumpo, a passionate cook who shared a building with Frank
- Samantha Mathis as Maria Castle, Frank's wife
- Laura Harring as Livia Saint, Howard's wife
- James Carpinello as
  - Robert "Bobby" Saint, Howard's youngest son, who was killed in an FBI sting operation courtesy of Frank Castle
  - John Saint, Howard's eldest and more mature son
- Eddie Jemison as Mickey Duka, a drug dealer-turned-lackey whose actions got Bobby killed
- Mark Collie as Harry Heck, a musician/hitman hired by Saint to kill Castle
- Roy Scheider as Frank Castle Sr., Frank's father
- Marcus Johns as Will Castle, Frank's son
- Russell Andrews as Jimmy Weeks, Frank's partner in the FBI
- Kevin Nash as The Russian, a muscled-up hitman hired by Saint to kill Castle
- Veryl Jones as Candelaria, the local fisherman in Puerto Rico who saved Castle

Hensleigh and Arad have said in many interviews that Jane was the first and only actor to be asked to play the title role. Arad had previously pursued Jane for other roles in Marvel Studios films. He turned down the Punisher twice, as he did not see himself as a superhero actor. Jane said, when asked the second time to play the Punisher, that he became interested when Arad sent Tim Bradstreet's artwork of the character. After learning more about the Punisher, he accepted. Jane went on to read as many Punisher comics he could find to understand the character, and became a fan of the Punisher in the process. Jane trained for six to seven months with the United States Navy SEALs and gained more than 20 pounds of muscle for the part.

== Production ==
I had to ask myself intellectual questions like, "To what extent do crimes against a person become so unconscionable, so heinous, that even a person who does not believe in vigilantism can resort to vigilantism in a more just way?" That was the equation for me. I told Marvel that I didn't just want to do a revenge story, that I wanted to do the mother of all revenge stories. I wanted to ramp everything up. I can't really go further without doing spoilers here. The underlying events that give rise to Frank Castle's vigilantism are not from the comic. I invented a lot of that. I made it a lot worse.
—Jonathan Hensleigh on The Punisher

Marvel Films began development for a new Punisher film as early as 1997. In 2000, Marvel made a long-term agreement with Artisan Entertainment to turn 15 of their characters into films and television shows, among them The Punisher with Gale Anne Hurd to produce. The Punisher marked Marvel's first major independent release as an equity owner, whereby it contributes characters and creative support to lower-budget pics in exchange for a financial stake in the negative cost. Screenwriter Jonathan Hensleigh signed on in April 2002, and The Punisher also became his directing debut. The story and plot were mainly based on two Punisher comic book stories, Welcome Back, Frank and The Punisher: Year One. Hensleigh explained he had to excise much of the influence from Welcome Back, Frank, as it would have likely been a four-hour-long film.

Before filming began, Hensleigh was not given the budget he wanted or needed from the studio. Hensleigh knew that most action pictures get a budget of around $64 million. He was only given $33 million, with only $15.5 million going towards the shooting budget and post-production for the film, with only 52 days to shoot, which is half the time allocated for most action pictures. Most of Hensleigh's original script had to be edited and rewritten many times due to budget issues. According to the DVD commentary, the first scene in the film would have been a battle set in Kuwait during the Gulf War, but they were unable to film this scene as a result of the budget cuts.

Principal photography for The Punisher began in July 2003 on location in Tampa, Florida. Filming finished on October 14, 2003, after 52 days of filming. The Florida location was first chosen at the insistence of screenwriter Michael France, who advised Marvel and Artisan that "it would be cheap to shoot [there]—that they'd get a lot more for their money than in New York or Chicago" as well as wanting to use "both sunny locations, and dark, industrial locations" in the screenplay. For inspiration, Hensleigh and cinematographer Conrad W. Hall looked at dozens of action films from the 1960s and 1970s, such as the Dirty Harry series, The Getaway, The Good, the Bad and the Ugly, The Godfather, and Bonnie and Clyde. In an interview, Hensleigh also stated the film pays homage to Mad Max and William Shakespeare's Othello, though while he was inspired by Othello, the characters were reversed for the film, making the Punisher the instigator of the jealousy that leads to Howard Saint murdering his best friend and wife.

After shooting, Lions Gate Films purchased Artisan, resulting in their assuming distribution before the film's release. In an interview, Hensleigh said that though the film is distributed under the Lions Gate imprint, the film was still considered an Artisan film, as Lions Gate was not involved with the production and greenlighting, even before the Lions Gate / Artisan merger. During the shooting of a fight scene, Jane stabbed Nash in the collarbone with a blunted butterfly knife after a stunt co-ordinator forgot to change the props. Nash did not break character, but continued the scene and accepted cold beers for the crew from the producers as compensation for the accident.

The character of Microchip was originally included in an earlier Michael France draft (along with the character Jigsaw), but was excised from later drafts because of director Jonathan Hensleigh's distaste for him. Instead, the character of Mickey Duka (who was heavily based upon the character Mickey Fondozzi) serves as an ally of Frank Castle's. Regarding the exclusion of Microchip, Hensleigh had this to say:

There are a couple of years where I didn't want to go; Microchip, the battle van, all that stuff, where it got really high-tech; we're not going there at all. I deemed that too complicated, too lacking in the spirit of the sort of urban vigilante. The Punisher doesn't just go around blowing people away; he uses guile and cunning just as much as he does weaponry and physical combat.

== Music ==
The score to The Punisher was composed and conducted by Italian composer Carlo Siliotto. Director Jonathan Hensleigh wanted the music to be very emotional and was aware of Siliotto's previous work, which led to him being chosen. When scoring the film, Siliotto saw Frank Castle as a tragic figure, stating, "This man, Frank Castle, is somebody who has a slaughtered family. He comes through that slaughter and becomes a punisher. But he's a sad man—he drinks, and has bad memories always coming to him. There's a lot in the film, and at times it is like a modern version of a classic tragedy—like Othello."

== Release ==
=== Home media ===
The film was released via DVD on September 7, 2004, and sold nearly 1.8 million copies in its first five days and netted $10.8 million in rentals its first week, making it number one in DVD sales that week. The DVD release included an exclusive comic book.

An extended-cut DVD was released on November 21, 2006, with 17 minutes of additional footage, most of which revolves around the character Jimmy Weeks (Russell Andrews), and Castle realizing that his friend was who had sold him out to Howard Saint. In retaliation, Castle forces Weeks to commit suicide. Features also include a black-and-white stop-motion animated scene, set in Kuwait, based on and partially done by artist Tim Bradstreet, and a Punisher comic-book gallery. An extended version of "In Time" by Mark Collie also appears in the closing credits of the extended-cut DVD. This version does not include the special features on the standard DVD release.

The Punisher was released via Blu-ray Disc on June 27, 2006, and 4K UHD on September 25, 2018, both only including the theatrical cut. On October 10, 2019, the bluray version with the extended cut was released, featuring 139 min.

== Reception ==
=== Box office ===
The Punisher opened in 2,649 theaters on April 16, 2004, and grossed $13.8 million over its opening weekend, ranking at number two at the box office, behind Kill Bill: Volume 2. The film has a US gross of $33.8 million and an international gross of $20.9 million, giving it a worldwide total of $54.7 million.

=== Critical response ===
On the review aggregator website Rotten Tomatoes, 29% of 171 critics' reviews are positive, with an average rating of 4.6/10. The website's consensus reads: "A good cast fails to elevate this overly violent and by-the-numbers revenge flick." Metacritic, which uses a weighted average, assigned the film a score of 33 out of 100, based on 36 critics, indicating "generally unfavorable" reviews. Audiences surveyed by CinemaScore gave the film a grade of "B+".

Film critic Roger Ebert gave the film two stars, stating, "The Punisher is so grim and cheerless, you wonder if even its hero gets any satisfaction from his accomplishments." Joe Leydon of Variety describes the film as "depressingly rote and sometimes laughably silly". Leydon praises Jane for his "appropriate physicality and brooding gravitas", but criticizes Travolta, saying he does "nothing to inject fresh life into bland archetype".

Some reviewers defended the film, stating that compared to most comic book-based films, it is a well-done throwback to the old-school action films of the 1960s and 1970s. Critic A. O. Scott stated, "But lightness is not among Hensleigh's gifts. Making his directorial debut after a successful run as a screenwriter and producer (on projects like Die Hard with a Vengeance, Jumanji, and The Rock), he has clearly conceived The Punisher as a throwback to the leathery, angry, urban revenge movies of the 1970s."

Drew McWeeny of Ain't It Cool News said of the style of the film that "The Punisher has more in common with the work of Don Siegel and John Frankenheimer than it does with the work of Michael Bay or Simon West. Which isn't to say that it's the equal of those classics, but at least Hensleigh's got the right idea. ... The Punisher is pulp, served up gritty and ugly and brutal. It's not jam-packed full of one-liners. What humor there is in the film is dark."

=== Accolades ===
Mark Chadwick won "Best Fire Stunt" at the Taurus World Stunt Awards. Several other crew members were nominated for work on the film: Donna Evans for Best Overall Stunt by a Stunt Woman, Gary M. Hymes for Best Stunt Coordinator or Second Unit Director, and Keii Johnston and Dane Farwell for Best Work with a Vehicle.

The Punisher was also nominated for a Prism Award in the Wide Release Feature Film category.

== Other media ==
=== Novelization ===
Before release, a novelization was written by D.A. Stern and released in March 2004.

=== Video game ===
Jane reprised the role of Frank Castle in the 2005 video game The Punisher.

== Franchise ==
=== Cancelled sequel ===
Lions Gate Entertainment planned to produce a direct sequel titled The Punisher 2, with Avi Arad, chairman and CEO of Marvel Studios, stating that the second film would "become the fifth Marvel property to become a sequel." Jonathan Hensleigh said that he was interested in working with Thomas Jane again for The Punisher 2. Jane said that the villain for The Punisher 2 would be Jigsaw. The project lingered in development for over three years. Jonathan Hensleigh completed a first draft of the script before pulling out around 2006. John Dahl was in talks to direct the film, but pulled out due to script quality issues and the studio not wanting to spend much money on the project. Rob Zombie was also considered to direct the sequel. In a statement on May 15, 2007, and in two audio interviews, Thomas Jane said that he pulled out of the project due to creative differences and the budget of the film being cut, in addition to director Walter Hill being turned down as director by Lionsgate. After reading the new script by Kurt Sutter, Jane stated:

What I won't do is spend months of my life sweating over a movie that I just don't believe in. I've always loved the Marvel guys and wish them well. Meanwhile, I'll continue to search for a film that one day might stand with all those films that the fans have asked me to watch.

=== Reboot ===
In June 2007, Lexi Alexander reportedly replaced Dahl as director, and that actor Ray Stevenson would replace Thomas Jane in the title role. The Punisher 2 then became Punisher: War Zone, a reboot of The Punisher film series with no connection to the 2004 film. The reboot was released on December 5, 2008. This is the second time the film series has been rebooted, after the 2004 production rebooted 1989's The Punisher.

=== Marvel Cinematic Universe ===
The Punisher rights eventually reverted to Marvel Studios, who rebooted the series again in the Marvel Cinematic Universe, with Jon Bernthal portraying the character in the second season of Daredevil (2016), its spin-off series, The Punisher (2017–2019), the first season of Daredevil: Born Again (2025), the television special The Punisher: One Last Kill, and the film Spider-Man: Brand New Day (both 2026).

=== Short film ===
In July 2012, Jane reprised his role as Frank Castle in the unofficial sequel short film The Punisher: Dirty Laundry, which premiered at San Diego Comic-Con. The 10-minute film also stars Ron Perlman.
