= Mankiller =

Mankiller may refer to:

== Surname ==
- Mankiller, a family surname and traditional Cherokee military rank
- Wilma Mankiller, first female Chief of the Cherokee Nation
- Ostenaco (ca. 1703 – 1780), Cherokee mankiller often referred to by his rank

== Media ==
- Man-Killer, a supervillain in the Marvel Comics universe
- Mankillers, also known as 12 Wild Women, a 1987 US film
- Mankiller (film), a 2017 film

== See also ==
- Skiagusta – Cherokee military ranks
