= Clockstoppers =

2002 film by Jonathan Frakes

- Theatrical release poster
- Directed by: Jonathan Frakes
- Screenplay by: Rob Hedden; J. David Stem; David N. Weiss
- Story by: Rob Hedden; Andy Hedden; J. David Stem; David N. Weiss
- Produced by: Julia Pistor; Gale Anne Hurd
- Starring: Jesse Bradford; Paula Garcés; French Stewart; Michael Biehn; Robin Thomas
- Cinematography: Tim Suhrstedt
- Edited by: Peter E. Berger; Jeff W. Canavan
- Music by: Jamshied Sharifi
- Production companies: Nickelodeon Movies; Valhalla Motion Pictures
- Distributed by: Paramount Pictures (North America); United International Pictures (International)
- Release date: March 29, 2002
- Running time: 94 minutes
- Country: United States
- Language: English
- Budget: $26 million
- Box office: $38.8 million

Clockstoppers is a 2002 American science fiction action comedy film directed by Jonathan Frakes, produced by Julia Pistor and Gale Anne Hurd, and written screenplay by Rob Hedden and the writing team of J. David Stem and David N. Weiss. The film centers on future tech "Hypertime" devices which speed up the users' molecules, creating the illusion that time has stopped from the perspective of the users. The story follows teenager Zak Gibbs, who accidentally acquires one of these devices and finds himself on the run from agents of the corporation which created them, all of whom wield Hypertime devices themselves. The film stars Jesse Bradford, Paula Garcés, French Stewart, Michael Biehn, Robin Thomas, and Julia Sweeney.

The film was released in the United States on March 29, 2002, by Paramount Pictures. It received mixed reviews from critics and grossed $39 million against a $26 million budget.

== Plot ==
The NSA-funded Quantum Tech (QT) Corporation has slated a project to develop Hypertime, a technology which allows the user's molecules to speed up to the point where the world appears in standstill. NSA head Moore ends the project due to the risk of the technology being acquired by hostile powers. QT's CEO Henry Gates plans on using Hypertime to dominate the world, but these plans are now falling apart: The NSA has given him one weekend before they collect his equipment. Meanwhile, QT's lead scientist Earl Dopler cannot fix a glitch which causes subjects in Hypertime to age rapidly, and after QT henchmen prevent Dopler's incognito departure at the airport, Dopler informs Gates that he sent information on Hypertime and a prototype Hypertime wristwatch to his former teacher Dr. George Gibbs in hopes he could find a fix for the glitch.

Gibbs' daughter Kelly accidentally knocks the watch into a box of his son Zak's things. George is away at a convention on applied science, having turned down Zak's appeals to go car shopping with him. Zak repeatedly bombs out with Francesca, the new girl at school. First he gives a condescending offer to show her around and then, after helping her rake some leaves brings a live opossum into her house. However, she is impressed when he shows her the power of the watch, which they use to pull pranks around town, and later help Zak's friend Meeker wins a battle of the DJs contest. Before they part ways, Francesca gives Zak a kiss goodnight.

Gates sends henchmen to George's house to recover the prototype. They are armed with Hypertime watches and solid nitrogen guns, which put other Hypertime users back into normal time. While fleeing from them, Zak discovers Dopler tied up in their van and frees him. A chase ensues, with Zak crashing the van into a river, thus disabling the watch. Zak awakens in a hospital and is charged with stealing the van. He gets the watch working just long enough to steal a policeman's uniform, allowing him to evade both the police and Gates's henchmen. QT Corporation contacts national security agencies and portrays Zak, George and Dopler as fugitives. Zak goes on the run with Francesca, locating the hotel that George is staying at. QT reaches George first and captures him to replace Dopler.

Dopler captures Zak and Francesca with a garbage truck. Francesca knocks Dopler out, she and Zak interrogate him when he recovers. Dopler reluctantly agrees to help save George. Using components that the three of them steal from a science convention, Dopler mends the broken watch and builds their own set of nitrogen guns.

Zak and Francesca break in to the QT facility. After activating Hypertime, Zak swaps a nonfunctional watch onto his wrist as a backup plan. QT captures them and confiscates the nonfunctional watch, they are put in a cell with George. The NSA deadline expires, so Gates puts the whole facility into Hypertime to stop the approaching NSA agents. Zak uses his concealed watch while in Hypertime, which causes his particles to accelerate to the point of instability and allows him to pass through the walls of their cell. He distracts Gates and the henchmen long enough for George to rig a bomb which destroys the machine generating Hypertime. Gates tries to kill Francesca, Zak and George, but Dopler arrives and shoots Gates with nitrogen. The NSA agents take the watches to keep them safe, and arrest Gates and his henchmen. The charges against Zak are dropped.

Dopler uses the machine he was building to reverse the aging effects of Hypertime, but it inadvertently changes him back into a teenager, meaning he will have to live with the Gibbs family for a few years. George lets Zak get the car he wanted. As Zak speeds off in his car with Kelly, Francesca, and Dopler, it is revealed that Zak has not returned the watch and continues to have fun in Hypertime.

== Cast ==
- Jesse Bradford as Zachary "Zak" Gibbs, a 17 year-old boy who finds a time-stopping watch.
- Paula Garcés as Francesca, a Venezuelan 17 year-old girl who moves to Zak's town.
- French Stewart as Earl Dopler, a scientist that was unwillingly brought back into the services of QT Corporation.
  - Miko Hughes as young Earl Dopler
- Michael Biehn as Henry Gates, the CEO of QT Corporation.
- Robin Thomas as Dr. George Gibbs, a scientist who is the father of Zak and the colleague of Earl Dopler.
- Garikayi Mutambirwa as Meeker, Zak's best friend.
- Julia Sweeney as Jennifer "Jenny" Gibbs, the mother of Zak.
- Lindze Letherman as Kelly Gibbs, the younger sister of Zak.
- Grant Marvin as Prof. Jenning
- Jason George as Richard, an agent who works for Henry.
- Linda Kim as Jay, a silent agent who works for Henry.
- Ken Jenkins as Moore, an agent of the NSA
- Jonathan Frakes (uncredited cameo) as a bystander
- Judi M. Durand as the uncredited voice of the Q.T. Computer
- Jenette Goldstein as Doctor
- DJ Swamp as himself

== Production ==
On May 1998, it was reported that director Dennis Dugan has signed a seven-figure deal to direct Clockstoppers for Paramount Pictures and follows a scientist whose invention causes people to move 25 times faster than the rest of the world and when his son and the son's friends are accidentally zapped by the device, the scientist must find a way to return them to normal. Gale Anne Hurd was attached as producer and Laurie Craig had revised the screenplay following earlier drafts by Rob and Andy Hedden as well as Paul and Chris Weitz.

In May 2000, it was announced that Paramount Pictures had officially greenlit Clockstoppers with Jonathan Frakes replacing Dugan to direct with David N. Weiss and J. David Stem was set to write the screenplay. The move followed Nickelodeon Movies' recent box office success with Snow Day (2000).

Frakes later recalled, "That script had been at Paramount a long time, and because of the success of First Contact and Insurrection, Paramount blew the dust off and got a rewrite, and we did it at a nice price."

On November 2000, it was announced that Jesse Bradford was signed on to play a teenager who accidentally activates a machine that makes time stand still, leaving him and his friends to figure out how to reverse the effect. Filming was scheduled to begin in January 2001.

The shot of the accelerated Zak being frozen was done by Cinesite as a green screen composite of three shots: one with Zak actor Jesse Bradford leaping, one with Michael Biehn aiming the nitrogen gun, and one with the scenery and the computer-generated nitrogen stream.

== Soundtrack ==
Clockstoppers: Music from the Motion Picture

Soundtrack album by various artists
- Released: March 19, 2002
- Genre: Pop-punk
- Length: 52:36
- Label: Hollywood

The soundtrack for the film was released on March 19, 2002, by Hollywood Records.

CD
No.	Title	Artist	Length
1.	"Holiday in My Head"	Smash Mouth	2:40
2.	"Abracadabra" (2002 Ralph Sall Remix)	Sugar Ray	3:44
3.	"A Song for Everyone"	Fenix TX	4:11
4.	"Time After Time"	Uncle Kracker	4:20
5.	"Never Let You Go"	Third Eye Blind	3:57
6.	"All the Small Things"	Blink-182	2:48
7.	"First Date"	Blink-182	2:51
8.	"Breathe"	Nickelback	3:59
9.	"The Minute I Met You"	New Found Glory	3:03
10.	"The Worst Day Ever"	Simple Plan	3:34
11.	"Bohemian Like You"	The Dandy Warhols	3:32
12.	"Quicksand"	Lit	3:18
13.	"Space to Share"	Scapegoat Wax	4:04
14.	"Know My Name"	Kool Keith	3:23
15.	"It's the Weekend"	Lil' J	3:02
16.	"Everybody Have Fun Tonight"	Wang Chung	4:48
17.	"Time Is Ticking Out"	The Cranberries	3:01

== Home media ==
Clockstoppers was released on VHS and DVD on August 13, 2002. The film was released on Blu-ray on January 25, 2022.

== Reception ==
On Rotten Tomatoes, the film has an approval rating of 29% based on 85 reviews, with an average rating of 4.81/10. The website's critics consensus called it "A pleasant diversion for the young teens, but a waste of time for anyone older." On Metacritic, it has a weighted average score of 40 out of 100, based on 24 critics, indicating "mixed or average reviews." Audiences polled by CinemaScore gave the film an average grade of "B+" on an A+ to F scale.

Roger Ebert of the Chicago Sun-Times gave it 2.5 stars out of 4, and wrote: "The movie has been produced by Nickelodeon, and will no doubt satisfy its intended audience enormously." He also noted that it did not cross over, and that it offered little for parents or older siblings. Robert Koehler of Variety called it "A blandly conceived youth adventure lacking zing or style." Nell Minow of Common Sense Media gave the film four stars out of five, describing it as a "Fun action comedy with nifty special effects." She also noted that the film's plot is a "throw-back to the old Disney classics like The Shaggy Dog and The Absent-Minded Professor," and the special effects that "handles the sci-fi aspect with [it] that truly are special." IGN's Scott B. rate the film two stars out of five (score 4 out of 10) and wrote that it "most of [his] criticisms come squarely from the perspective of an adult recognizing just how much Clockstoppers has homogenized a provocative conceit." Russell Smith of The Austin Chronicle gave the film rate two stars out of five, saying that "actually works pretty well most of the time, raising whether likability and constant sensory stimulation really do compensate for a multitude of cinematic sins, or whether I'm simply losing my ability to differentiate among levels of mediocrity." Ed Gonzalez of Slant Magazine gave a rate two stars out of four, saying "unusually fetishistic for a film so skittish about swapping saliva." He also noted for the special effects that it was "retro-cool and should tickle anyone still fond of Nick’s Adventures of Alex Mack." Danny Graydon of Empire gave this a film also two stars out of five, writing that "the predictably safe tone favors the welter of teen clichés, while the one major special effect is quite meager and quickly dispensed with. Ultimately, the lackluster material forces director Frakes to keep proceedings loud and fa."

Clockstoppers opened at a number five at the box office ranking in $10.1 million in its first opening weekend, the following week it went down to #7 where it spent a week more. The film grossed a total of $38.8 million against a budget of $26 million.

== See also ==
- A Kind of a Stopwatch
- Bernard's Watch
- The New Accelerator
- Treehouse of Horror XIV
- Wink of an Eye
