= Mark Goldblatt =

American film editor and director

- Born: New York City, New York, US
- Education: University of Wisconsin; London Film School
- Occupations: Film editor, director
- Children: Max Goldblatt

Mark Goldblatt is an American film editor and director. He was nominated for an Academy Award for Best Film Editing for his work on Terminator 2: Judgement Day (1991). He is a former President of the American Cinema Editors.

== Life and career ==
Brooklyn-born Goldblatt studied at the University of Wisconsin and London Film School, where his instructors included Mike Leigh, Clive Donner and Frank Clarke. Upon his return to the United States, Goldblatt observed Alfred Hitchcock on the set of one of his final films, Family Plot, and became a PA at Roger Corman's New World Pictures, where he worked with up-and-coming filmmakers including Joe Dante and Ron Howard. Corman's then-assistant, Gale Ann Hurd, connected Goldblatt with James Cameron, which led to their collaboration on mainstream hits including The Terminator, Terminator 2: Judgment Day (for which Goldblatt received an Oscar nomination), and True Lies. Lies led to collaborations with Jerry Bruckheimer and Michael Bay (Armageddon, Pearl Harbor, Bad Company, Bad Boys II) and Paul Verhoeven (Showgirls, Hollow Man and Starship Troopers). Goldblatt's additional credits include Rambo: First Blood Part II, Commando, Predator 2, X-Men: The Last Stand, Rise of the Planet of the Apes, Chappie, and Death Wish. He also directed The Punisher and Dead Heat.

Goldblatt describes the best part of being an editor as, "Being able to create something out of a given set of filmed material that seems to be greater than the sum of its parts. By this I mean subtext and grace and counterpoint of characters (and performances) that comes out of a dialectical montage."

He is a member and former vice president and president of the American Cinema Editors (or ACE Society) as well as a long-standing Board of Governors of the Academy of Motion Picture Arts and Sciences. In 2018, Goldblatt became an ACE Career Achievement Awards honoree.

== Personal life ==
He is the father of actor, director, and editor Max Goldblatt.

== Filmography ==
Year	Film	Director	Notes
1976	Eat My Dust!	Charles B. Griffith	Production assistant
1976	Hollywood Boulevard	Joe Dante	Production assistant
1976	Hollywood Boulevard	Allan Arkush	Production assistant
1977	Grand Theft Auto	Ron Howard	Associate editor
1978	Piranha	Joe Dante	Saturn Award for Best Editing
1979	Spirit of the Wind	Ralph Liddle	
1980	Humanoids from the Deep	Barbara Peeters	
1981	Enter the Ninja	Menahem Golan	
1981	The Howling	Joe Dante	
1981	Halloween II	Rick Rosenthal	
1981	Halloween II	John Carpenter	
1983	Get Crazy	Allan Arkush	Supervising editor
1983	Wavelength	Mike Gray	
1984	Over the Brooklyn Bridge	Menahem Golan	
1984	The Ambassador	J. Lee Thompson	
1984	The Terminator	James Cameron	Editor
1985	Commando	Mark L. Lester	
1985	Rambo: First Blood Part II	George P. Cosmatos	
1986	Jumpin' Jack Flash	Penny Marshall	
1987	Innerspace	Joe Dante	Additional editor
1987	RoboCop	Paul Verhoeven	Second unit director
1988	Dead Heat	Mark Goldblatt	Director only
1989	The Punisher	Mark Goldblatt	Director only
1990	Nightbreed	Clive Barker	
1990	Predator 2	Stephen Hopkins	
1991	Terminator 2: Judgment Day	James Cameron	Nominated—Academy Award for Best Film Editing; Nominated—ACE Award for Best Edited Feature Film – Dramatic
1991	The Last Boy Scout	Tony Scott	
1992	Universal Soldier	Roland Emmerich	Editorial consultant
1993	Super Mario Bros.	Rocky Morton	
1993	Super Mario Bros.	Annabel Jankel	
1993	Tombstone	George P. Cosmatos	Additional editor
1993	Tombstone	Kevin Jarre	Additional editor
1994	True Lies	James Cameron	Nominated—ACE Award for Best Edited Feature Film – Dramatic
1995	Showgirls	Paul Verhoeven	
1996	The Rock	Michael Bay	Additional editor
1997	Starship Troopers	Paul Verhoeven	
1998	Armageddon	Michael Bay	
1999	Detroit Rock City	Adam Rifkin	
2000	Hollow Man	Paul Verhoeven	
2001	Pearl Harbor	Michael Bay	
2002	Bad Company	Joel Schumacher	
2003	Bad Boys II	Michael Bay	
2004	Exorcist: The Beginning	Renny Harlin	
2004	The Cutting Edge: The Magic of Movie Editing	Wendy Apple	Self appearance only
2005	XXX: State of the Union	Lee Tamahori	
2006	X-Men: The Last Stand	Brett Ratner	Satellite Award for Best Editing
2009	Case 39	Christian Alvart	
2009	G-Force	Hoyt Yeatman	
2009	Calvin Marshall	Gary Lundgren	Editorial consultant
2010	The Wolfman	Joe Johnston	Uncredited
2010	The Twilight Saga: Eclipse	David Slade	Additional editor
2011	Rise of the Planet of the Apes	Rupert Wyatt	
2013	Percy Jackson: Sea of Monsters	Thor Freudenthal	
2015	The SpongeBob Movie: Sponge Out of Water	Mike Mitchell	Additional editor
2015	Chappie	Neill Blomkamp	
2016	The Huntsman: Winter's War	Cedric Nicolas-Troyan	Additional editor
2018	Death Wish	Eli Roth	

== Awards and nominations ==
Goldblatt is an Academy Award nominee for his work on Terminator 2: Judgment Day, a winner of Academy of Science Fiction, Fantasy and Horror Films' Saturn Award for Piranha (1978) and a Satellite Award for X-Men: The Last Stand, and was twice nominated for ACE's Eddie Award for his work on Terminator 2: Judgment Day and True Lies.
