= Safe Passage (film) =

- Theatrical release poster
- Directed by: Robert Allan Ackerman
- Written by: Deena Goldstone
- Based on: Safe Passage by Ellyn Bache
- Produced by: Gale Anne Hurd
- Starring: Susan Sarandon; Sam Shepard; Robert Sean Leonard; Nick Stahl; Jason London; Marcia Gay Harden; Sean Astin
- Cinematography: Ralf D. Bode
- Edited by: Rick Shrine
- Music by: Mark Isham
- Production company: Pacific Western Productions
- Distributed by: New Line Cinema
- Release dates: December 23, 1994 (Los Angeles); January 6, 1995 (United States)
- Running time: 98 minutes
- Country: United States
- Language: English
- Box office: $1.6 million

Safe Passage is a 1994 American drama film starring Susan Sarandon, and featuring Sam Shepard, Robert Sean Leonard, Marcia Gay Harden, Nick Stahl, Sean Astin, and Jason London. Directed by Robert Allan Ackerman and written by Deena Goldstone, it is based on the 1988 novel Safe Passage by Ellyn Bache.

The film centers on a large family that reconvenes when one of the adult sons, a Marine deployed in Lebanon for the Gulf War, is possibly among the victims of an explosion at his base. As the family waits out the news, they reopen old wounds, grudges, and unresolved issues.

== Plot ==
Margaret "Mag" Singer, a wife and mother of seven sons, is on the verge of divorcing her husband Patrick and moving to the city for a life of her own. All of the Singers' sons—except for Simon, the youngest—are grown and live on their own. Suddenly, Mag hears news of a terrorist bombing at a Marine base in the Middle East, where Percival, one of her sons, is stationed. Upon learning the news, the remaining five sons gather at the Singer home, anxiously awaiting updates on Percival. The sons include Alfred, the eldest Singer, who is engaged to Cynthia; Gideon, who feels responsible for Percival's decision to enlist and thus blames himself for Percival's possible death; identical twins Darren and Merle; and Izzy, the second-youngest who followed his father into science.

The film's plot shifts between the Singer family resolving old hurts and wounds and flashbacks to Mag raising her sons. At the end, the family is gathered around the TV nervously waiting for word on Percival. Percival is revealed to be safe, and the family rejoices at the good news and their renewed bonds.

== Cast ==
- Susan Sarandon as Margaret "Mag" Singer
- Sam Shepard as Patrick Singer, Mag's husband
- Robert Sean Leonard as Alfred Singer, Mag & Patrick's first son
- Philip Arthur Ross as Merle Singer, Mag & Patrick's second son and Darren's identical twin brother
- Steven Robert Ross as Darren Singer, Mag & Patrick's third son and Merle's identical twin brother
- Sean Astin as Izzy Singer, Mag & Patrick's fourth son
- Matt Keeslar as Percival Singer, Mag & Patrick's fifth son
  - Jesse Lee as Young Percival Singer
- Jason London as Gideon Singer, Mag & Patrick's sixth son
- Nick Stahl as Simon Singer, Mag & Patrick's seventh son
- Marcia Gay Harden as Cynthia
- Philip Bosco as Mort
- Benjamin Preston as Cynthia's Son
- Jordan Clarke as Coach
- Jeffrey DeMunn as Doctor
- Rutanya Alda as Beth
- Joe Lisi as Dog Owner
- Marvin Scott as Newsperson #1
- Bill Boggs as Newsperson #2
- Christopher Wynkoop as Evangelist

== Production ==
Safe Passage was shot in Glen Ridge, New Jersey. It began shooting on January 26, 1994, and completed on March 22 of that year. The film was held up for release by a court injunction brought by Dan Lupowitz, who claimed he brought both the director and Susan Sarandon into the project and wanted an "executive producer" credit. The claim was later dismissed in court.

== Reception ==
The film received mixed reviews, with a Rotten Tomatoes score of 54% based on 13 reviews. In a two-star review, Roger Ebert praised the cast and Sarandon’s performance, but said the family drama felt contrived and formulaic. Lisa Schwarzbaum of Entertainment Weekly gave the film a grade of B−, commending the acting but saying Goldstone’s screenplay “has all of the heft of a special, two-hour episode of Party of Five — a TV-shaped domestic drama overloaded with the kinds of emotions you see only on TV and never in your own family.”

== Year-end lists ==
- 4th – Mack Bates, The Milwaukee Journal
- Honorable mention – Glenn Lovell, San Jose Mercury News
