= No Escape (1994 film) =

1994 film by Martin Campbell

- Theatrical release poster
- Directed by: Martin Campbell
- Screenplay by: Michael Gaylin; Joel Gross
- Based on: The Penal Colony by Richard Herley
- Produced by: Jake Eberts; Gale Anne Hurd
- Starring: Ray Liotta; Lance Henriksen; Stuart Wilson; Kevin Dillon; Kevin J. O'Connor; Michael Lerner; Ernie Hudson
- Cinematography: Phil Méheux
- Edited by: Terry Rawlings
- Music by: Graeme Revell
- Production companies: Pacific Western Productions; Allied Filmmakers
- Distributed by: Savoy Pictures (North America); Columbia TriStar Film Distributors International (International)
- Release date: April 29, 1994
- Running time: 118 minutes
- Countries: United States; United Kingdom
- Language: English
- Budget: $20 million
- Box office: $22.4 million

No Escape, released in some countries as Escape from Absolom and Absolom 2022, is a 1994 science fiction action film directed by Martin Campbell. It stars Ray Liotta, Lance Henriksen, Stuart Wilson, Kevin Dillon, Michael Lerner and Ernie Hudson. It was based on the 1987 novel The Penal Colony by Richard Herley. In a dystopian future, a former Reconnaissance Marine serves life imprisonment on an island inhabited by savage and cannibalistic prisoners.

It was the first film collaboration between the director Martin Campbell and actor Stuart Wilson, who both later worked on The Mask of Zorro and Vertical Limit, released in 1998 and 2000, and the film was also the third collaboration between the producer Gale Anne Hurd and Henriksen, after The Terminator and Aliens, both directed by James Cameron, and released in 1984 and 1986.

== Plot ==
In 2022, the penal system is run by corporations, and prisoners are seen as assets. Highly trained ex-Marine J.T. Robbins is imprisoned for life for murdering his commanding officer after being ordered to kill innocent civilians in Benghazi. Having escaped from two Level 5 maximum security prisons, he is sent to a Level 6 facility. A fellow prisoner tells him about Absolom, an island where they send the worst prisoners and which is feared more than traditional prisons. The Warden, after being held at gunpoint by Robbins, is convinced that he is a threat and exiles him to the island.

On the island, Robbins is captured by a group of prisoners known as the Outsiders, led by a sociopath named Walter Marek whose only rule is the law of the jungle. The abandoned island resort, complete with dilapidated houses and a swimming pool, is where the Outsiders have established a base. Marek forces Robbins to fight one of his men for amusement and is impressed when Robbins kills his opponent in seconds. He offers him a position in his gang. Instead, Robbins knocks Marek into the pool, steals his rocket launcher, and flees the Outsiders' camp. He is pursued through the jungle and cornered at the edge of a high cliff before being shot in the neck by blowgun darts. After falling into the river below, another prisoner group called the Insiders retrieves him.

Led by a man known as the Father, the Insiders have established a cooperative autonomous community with laws as opposed to the tyranny of the Outsiders. Robbins meets the Father; Hawkins, the head of security; King, a hypochondriac new-arrival helper; Dysart, an engineer; and Casey, a naïve young man given a life sentence for his minor role in a kidnapping which led to a dual felony murder when the hostages accidentally died. Robbins learns that the Insiders are heavily outnumbered by the Outsiders and that he is the only person to have ever escaped from Marek's camp. The weapon he stole is appropriated for the community.

Father notes Robbins' abilities and asks him to join them. He refuses, saying he wants to leave Absolom. Hawkins and Dysart take Robbins to the shore and explain that they are 200 miles (321.9 km) from the mainland. Gunships patrol 50 miles (80.5 km) off the coast, and infrared satellite technology monitors thermal activity, such as large fires or explosions. They tell him he is stuck there for life.

The Outsiders attack the Insiders camp during their Christmas party. Casey goes with others to guard the perimeter but cowers in fear. Marek nearly kills Father but Robbins saves him at the last second before the Outsiders flee.

Robbins discovers that the Insiders have secretly built a scan-proof boat that they launch in order to tell the outside world about Absolom. However, the boat is destroyed by attack helicopters, causing Father to believe there is an informer among them.

Robbins finds Dysart building a new boat and demands a seat on it. After learning that the engine needs a distributor, a part Robbins saw while in Marek's camp, he offers to retrieve it in exchange for passage for him and Casey, who he feels is too timid to be in Absolom. The Father agrees. Casey follows Robbins, who infiltrates the Outsiders' camp and gets the distributor, but they are captured by the Outsiders. Robbins is forced to fight Casey to the death. Realizing they won't both escape, Casey impales himself on Robbins' weapon. Robbins escapes a planned execution with the help of an Insider spy and returns to the Insiders.

Knowing Marek will attack, and over stern objections, Robbins convinces the Insiders to abandon their camp, but not before lacing it with booby traps. The Father attempts to convince Robbins to be the leader of the group when he dies, as he secretly has been suffering from progressive Hodgkin lymphoma that he estimates could kill him in a month without any sort of proper treatment. Robbins asserts his need to escape the island before coming to accept that the need to assert the truth of what really happened that led to his imprisonment and the truth about the island are equally important. When the Outsiders attack the abandoned camp, Robbins stays behind to fire the stolen rocket launcher, igniting an incendiary bomb. Most of the Outsiders die, and the Warden intervenes when the satellites are triggered.

The Father dies while defending Robbins from Marek. After Robbins kills Marek, he finds the new boat incinerated and evidence that King killed Dysart. Robbins attacks King, who confesses to acting as a spy for the Warden in return for his freedom. Robbins forces King to give new coordinates to the Warden for where to land his helicopter on the island. Robbins tells Hawkins that The Father told him that Hawkins should be the new leader before enacting a plan with the helicopter. With a group of fellow Insiders, Robbins hijacks the helicopter, throws the Warden out, and vows to spread the truth. King and the Warden are left behind as unseen Outsiders close in on them.

== Cast ==
- Ray Liotta as J.T. Robbins
- Lance Henriksen as The Father
- Stuart Wilson as Walter Marek
- Kevin Dillon as Casey
- Kevin J. O'Connor as Stephano
- Don Henderson as Killian
- Ian McNeice as Tom King
- Jack Shepherd as Dysart
- Michael Lerner as The Warden
- Ernie Hudson as Hawkins
- Russell Kiefel as "Iceman"
- Brian M. Logan as "Scab"
- Cheuk-Fai Chan as "Skull"

== Production ==
The film was originally developed under the working title Prison Colony. While major studios had shown interest in the project, they also insisted there be at least some female representation in the film. Producers Jake Eberts and Gale Anne Hurd opted to do the film independently and set up the production at Savoy Pictures.

== Reception ==
No Escape holds a rating of 59% on Rotten Tomatoes based on 22 reviews; the average rating is 5.3/10. Roger Ebert gave the film 2 out of 4 stars, giving praise to the technical ambitions of the filmmakers in sets and costume while calling it a film where "little thought has been given to the personalities of the characters."

The film grossed $15.3 million in the United States and Canada and $22.4 million worldwide.

== Merchandise ==
A video game of the same name based on the film was released in 1994 for Sega Genesis & Super Nintendo Entertainment System. A Sega CD version was planned and even advertised, but was cancelled for unknown reasons. Marvel Comics published a three-issue comic book miniseries that adapted the original novel and the film's script, the series had Roger Salick as a writer, Mike Harris as penciler, and Chris Ivy as inker.

== Home media ==
No Escape was released on VHS and Laserdisc in 1994, the VHS was re-released on April 14, 1998. The DVD was released by HBO on July 29, 1998. Columbia TriStar also released the film on DVD, VHS and Laserdisc in other countries from 1995 to 2003, while Sony Pictures Home Entertainment re-released the DVDs in 2005–2017. The DVD was released in United Kingdom on October 3, 2003, by Pathé. The film was first released on Blu-ray in Germany by Nameless Media (under the label of SPHE) in 2017, and includes with mediabook covers. On July 4, 2018, the film was released on Blu-ray and DVD by Umbrella Entertainment in Australia, and includes four TV Spots and Trailer. Unearthed Films released the film on Blu-ray with Special Features for the North American releases in October 2022.

== See also ==
- List of films featuring surveillance
- List of prison films
- Private prison
- Prison-industrial complex
