= Russian (comics) =

The Russian
- The Russian in The Punisher Vol. 5, #9 (December 2000); Art by Steve Dillon

Publication information
- Publisher: Marvel Comics
- First appearance: The Punisher Vol. 5, #8 (November 2000)
- Created by: Garth Ennis (writer); Steve Dillon (artist)

In-story information
- Full name: Ivan Vassilovitch Dragovsky
- Species: Human Cyborg
- Place of origin: Earth-616
- Team affiliations: Gnucci Family; General Kreigkopf's Army
- Abilities: Considerable strength, stamina and durability Nigh-invulnerability; Enhanced sense of smell

The Russian (Ivan Vassilovitch Dragovsky; Russian: Иван Васильевич Драговский) is a supervillain appearing in American comic books published by Marvel Comics. He is an enemy of the Punisher and Spider-Man.

Kevin Nash portrayed the character in the 2004 film The Punisher while Billy Clements portrayed him in the 2024 Marvel Cinematic Universe film Deadpool & Wolverine.

== Publication history ==
Created by Garth Ennis and Steve Dillon, the character made his first appearance in The Punisher Vol. 5, #8 (November 2000).

The Russian debuted off-panel in The Punisher Vol. 5, #8, was fully introduced in the following issue, and appeared in every subsequent one up until his death in Issue #11. In the following series, the character was resurrected as a cyborg, and was featured in The Punisher Vol. 6, #1-5.

The Russian received profiles in Marvel Encyclopedia #5, All-New Official Handbook of the Marvel Universe #9, and Official Handbook of the Marvel Universe A-Z #9

== Fictional character biography ==
The earliest known sightings of the Russian occurred while he was vacationing in Afghanistan in the 1980s. He subsequently traveled the world, inserting himself into various conflicts for fun and profit; locations he is said to have fought in include Lebanon, Iraq, Rwanda, East Timor, Chechnya, the Balkans, and Belfast (where he consumed a man on a bet). The Russian's activities led to him being wanted dead or alive by numerous law enforcement agencies, as well as criminal organizations such as the yakuza.

The Russian is contacted at his home in Kazakhstan by American crime lord Ma Gnucci, who offers him ten million dollars to kill the Punisher. The Russian agrees to the deal, boards a Russian airliner to North America, crashes it above Canada, and crosses the border into New York City, where he is briefed by Gnucci. The Russian is then brought to the Punisher's current address, and engages the vigilante, their fight (which the Russian dominates) bringing them into the apartment of the Punisher's neighbor, Mr. Bumpo. The Punisher burns the Russian's face with a hot pizza that Bumpo had been dining on, trips him, and then throws Bumpo on top of him. The Russian asphyxiates under Bumpo, and has his head cut off by the Punisher, who uses it to intimidate what remains of Gnucci's forces into surrendering.

The Russian's remains are recovered by General Kreigkopf, who resurrects him as a cyborg using technology stolen from S.H.I.E.L.D. He is given experimental hormone treatments to stabilize his body, causing him to develop breasts (which he adores) and an implied form of menstruation. To test the Russian's capabilities, Kreigkopf approves his request to return to New York City to kill the Punisher, who the Russian throws off of the Empire State Building. The Punisher is saved by Spider-Man, and in the battle that ensues he wields the superhero as a human shield, and uses his web-shooters to knock the Russian off of the skyscraper. The Russian survives crashing through the street below and being hit by a subway train, and retreats to Kreigkopf's base on Grand Nixon Island. The Russian is repaired, and denied another chance to face the Punisher.

The Russian is placed on a Boeing 747 full of soldiers that Kreigkopf intends to have attack the European Union in Brussels. The Punisher, who had tracked the Russian down, forces the airplane to crash into Grand Nixon Island's fuel depot; the Russian emerges from the wreckage as the only survivor. When Kreigkopf improvises his attack plan by ordering that a French airplane carrying a nuclear warhead be hijacked, the Punisher boards the aircraft, followed by the Russian. The Punisher blows out the back of the Russian's head by shoving a gun into his mouth, then chains him to the atomic bomb and drops it on Grand Nixon. The island and all of the criminals on it are obliterated, as is the Russian.

== Powers and abilities ==
In his first storyline, the Russian possessed tremendous strength and durability; he singlehandedly wipes out a Bravo Force team, unintentionally crushes a man with a friendly gesture, smacks the Punisher with a toilet he had ripped out of its foundation, and tears apart a revolver, while also being unfazed by getting kicked in the crotch, stabbed in the stomach, and bludgeoned with a chair. Additionally, he alludes to surviving freefalling from an airplane, and being repeatedly shot in the head. Despite his nigh-invulnerability, the Russian was sensitive to heat, becoming enraged when the Punisher successfully injured him with a stove, and a hot pizza.

When General Kreigkopf resurrected the Russian, he had his body augmented with plastics and adamantium, replaced most of his organs with ones taken from animals, and gave him olfactory sensors that increased his sense of smell to the level of a bloodhound.

== Obsession with American culture ==
In his initial comic appearances, the Russian was shown to have an obsession with American pop culture. His first thoughts upon being offered $10 million to kill the Punisher was a realization of how many pairs of Levi's and Compact Discs he could buy with that amount. The Russian is also a self-confessed superhero fan. He is the president of "The Daredevil, Man Without Fear, Fan Club" of Smolensk. He also wished to gain autographs from the X-Men, the Fantastic Four, and Spider-Man. He also believes Thor would make a good communist because of his big hammer.

== Other versions ==
=== Marvel MAX ===
An alternate universe variant of the Russian makes a cameo appearance in The Punisher (vol. 7) #75.

=== Marvel Noir ===
An alternate universe variant of the Russian appears in Punisher Noir. This version is a mercenary and former soldier. Following World War I, he was sent after Frank Castelione, who shoves a grenade into the Russian's pants and leaves him for dead in their ensuing fight. Years later, the Russian, now identifying as female, assists Jigsaw and Barracuda in murdering Frank on mob boss Dutch Schultz's behalf. After Frank's son, Frank Castelione Jr., grows up to become the Punisher and kills Barracuda and Jigsaw, he confronts the Russian at the Bronx Zoo, where the latter is mauled by alligators before Castelione Jr. kills her and frames her as the Punisher.

== In other media ==
=== Film ===
- The Russian appears in The Punisher (2004), portrayed by Kevin Nash. After being hired by a crime lord named Howard Saint to kill the eponymous character, the Russian withstands everything the Punisher throws at him and nearly beats him to death until the latter distracts him with a pot of boiling water before knocking him down a flight of stairs, which causes the Russian to break his neck.
- An alternate timeline variant of the Russian appears in Deadpool & Wolverine (2024), portrayed by an uncredited Billy Clements.

=== Video games ===
The Russian appears as a boss in The Punisher (2005), voiced by Darryl Kurylo. He works with General Kreigkopf to combat the eponymous character until the Russian is killed by a nuclear device that was smuggled into Grand Nixon Island.
