= Mickey Fondozzi =

Ally of the Marvel Comics antihero the Punisher

- Mickey Fondozzi in Marvel Knights #10 (April 2001); Art by Eduardo Barreto

Publication information
- Publisher: Marvel Comics
- First appearance: The Punisher War Zone #1 (March 1992)
- Created by: Chuck Dixon; John Romita Jr.

In-story information
- Full name: Michael Fondozzi
- Species: Human
- Place of origin: Earth
- Partnerships: Punisher; Microchip
- Supporting character of: Punisher
- Notable aliases: Number Eight

Michael "Mickey" Fondozzi is a fictional character appearing in American comic books published by Marvel Comics. The character has been depicted as an ally of the antihero the Punisher. He was created by Chuck Dixon and John Romita Jr., and first appeared in The Punisher War Zone #1 (March 1992).

== Publication history ==
The character first appeared in a story-arc that spanned The Punisher War Zone #1-6, and was also present in #9-10, #23, #31, #41, and both of The Punisher War Zone Annuals. Fondozzi's appearances in other titles include The Punisher War Journal #45-47, #60-61, #64, #68, and #78-79, The Punisher vol. 2, #86, #97-100, and #102-104, The Punisher Summer Special #4, and Marvel Knights #5 and #10-11.

== Fictional character biography ==
A career criminal living in Sheepshead Bay, Mickey claims to be Italian, but is in fact Albanian.

While robbing a Chinese restaurant that served as a front for the local triad, Mickey and his crew are attacked by the Punisher, who leaves the crook alive while butchering everyone else. Via psychological torture, the Punisher coerces Mickey into sponsoring him (under the alias "Johnny Tower") for membership in the Carbones, a Brooklyn crime family he belongs to.

When Salvatore Carbone, one of the family's top men, becomes suspicious of Mickey and "Johnny", the two frame him for disloyalty, and are given permission to kill him by Salvatore's brother and the Carbone family boss, Julius. The attempt on Salvatore's life goes awry, and ends with him falling through the ice of a frozen lake, where he is later found by the authorities and admitted to a hospital as a John Doe.

== Other versions ==
=== Crossoververse (Earth-7642) ===
Mickey is "a lousy little snitch" who is repeatedly accosted for information by the Punisher in The Punisher/Painkiller Jane. Painkiller Jane shoots Mickey to death after he tells her that he sold the Punisher out to a crime lord named Vinnie Veronica.

== In other media ==
Mickey Fondozzi, renamed Mickey Duka, appears in The Punisher, portrayed by Eddie Jemison. This version is an affiliate of the Saint crime family, who he secretly despises. After being psychologically tortured by the Punisher, Duka willingly helps him ruin the Saints by serving as a mole.
