= The YouTube Effect =

- Poster
- Directed by: Alex Winter
- Written by: Alex Winter
- Produced by: Gale Anne Hurd; Glen Zipper
- Distributed by: Drafthouse Films
- Release date: June 11, 2022 (Tribeca)
- Running time: 99 minutes
- Country: United States
- Language: English

The YouTube Effect is a 2022 American documentary film about YouTube. It was written and directed by Alex Winter.

== Participants ==
- Ryan Kaji
- Natalie Wynn
- Susan Wojcicki
- Steve Chen
- Anthony Padilla
- Caleb Cain

== Release ==
The film premiered at the Tribeca Film Festival on June 11, 2022. In May 2023, it was announced that Drafthouse Films acquired U.S. distribution rights to the film, which was released via the Alamo Drafthouse Cinema on July 7, 2023; then it was released nationwide on July 14, 2023.

== Reception ==
The film has an 85% rating on Rotten Tomatoes based on 20 reviews. Jason Delgado of Film Threat scored the film a 7 out of 10. Olly Richards of Empire awarded the film three stars out of five. Richard Whittaker of The Austin Chronicle also awarded the film three stars out of five.

William Bibbiani of TheWrap gave the film a positive review and wrote that it "may be a catalog of very recent history, but it serves the valuable function of connecting the many, seemingly randomly assorted dots into a clear narrative picture."
