= Mankiller (film) =

2017 film by Valerie Red-Horse

- Directed by: Valerie Red-Horse Mohl
- Produced by: Valerie Red-Horse Mohl; Charlie Soap; Kristina Kiehl; Stacy Mahoney
- Cinematography: Tarin Anderson; Josh Mayes
- Edited by: Ken Schneider; Joe Lamattina; Lisa Lamattina
- Music by: Jesse Friedman; Tyler Strickland
- Production companies: Red-Horse Native Productions; Valhalla Entertainment; Vision Maker Media; Corporation for Public Broadcasting
- Release date: June 19, 2017
- Running time: 74 minutes
- Country: United States
- Language: English

Mankiller is a 2017 documentary film directed by Valerie Red-Horse Mohl and executive produced by Gale Anne Hurd, concerning the life of Wilma Mankiller. The film had its US premiere on June 19, 2017, at the Los Angeles Film Festival. It was produced by Red-Horse Native Productions and Valhalla Entertainment and is a presentation of Vision Maker Media for PBS.

== Synopsis ==
The film follows the life of Wilma Mankiller, the first woman to be elected Principal Chief of the Cherokee Nation, from her childhood in Oklahoma, through her family's relocation to San Francisco, as well as her return to Oklahoma and her rise to power within the Cherokee Nation.

Mankiller utilizes original interviews with friends, family, and activists including Gloria Steinem as well as archival footage of Wilma Mankiller to depict a transcendent leader that overcame rampant sexism to usher in an era of improved stability and prosperity for the Cherokee Nation.

== Production ==
Vision Maker Media received funding for the research and development phase of the documentary in 2012. The initial research and development shooting took place in and around Tulsa, Oklahoma in July 2013. Production funding by Vision Maker Media was announced in 2014. On March 9, 2015, production company Valhalla Entertainment launched a Kickstarter campaign to fund the film. On April 8, 2015, the campaign ended after successfully raising $164,856 from over 1,000 backers with help from several actors from The Walking Dead.

The first phase of production filming took place in Los Angeles, New York, Oakland, Oklahoma, San Diego, and San Francisco during the summer and fall of 2015. Vision Maker Media was awarded additional funding in 2016. The final filming took place in Oklahoma and Wisconsin during August 2016. Post production and editing were completed in Los Angeles and San Francisco in late 2016 and early 2017.

== Release ==
The international film premiere took place on June 19, 2017, in the United States at the LA Film Festival and has since been selected to be screened at 20 film festivals around the world including DOC NYC, the Austin Film Festival, Mill Valley Film Festival, Winda in Australia, ImagineNative in Canada.

Mankiller will have its television premiere on PBS in March 2018 for Women's History Month.

== Reception ==
Initial reviews of the film were positive. Ed Rampell of Hollywood Progressive called it as a, "poignant biopic about one of the greats made me feel like weeping." Vincent Schilling of Indian Country Today described the film as "perfectly crafted to deliver a message of hope, empowerment and inspiration."

== Awards ==
The film won Best Documentary Feature at the Tulsa American and the Rome International Film Festivals, as well as the Stanford Video Award for Editing at the 2017 United Nations Association Film Festival. It was also named Best of the Fest at the Palm Springs International Film Festival.
