= Gale Anne Hurd =

American film producer and screenwriter

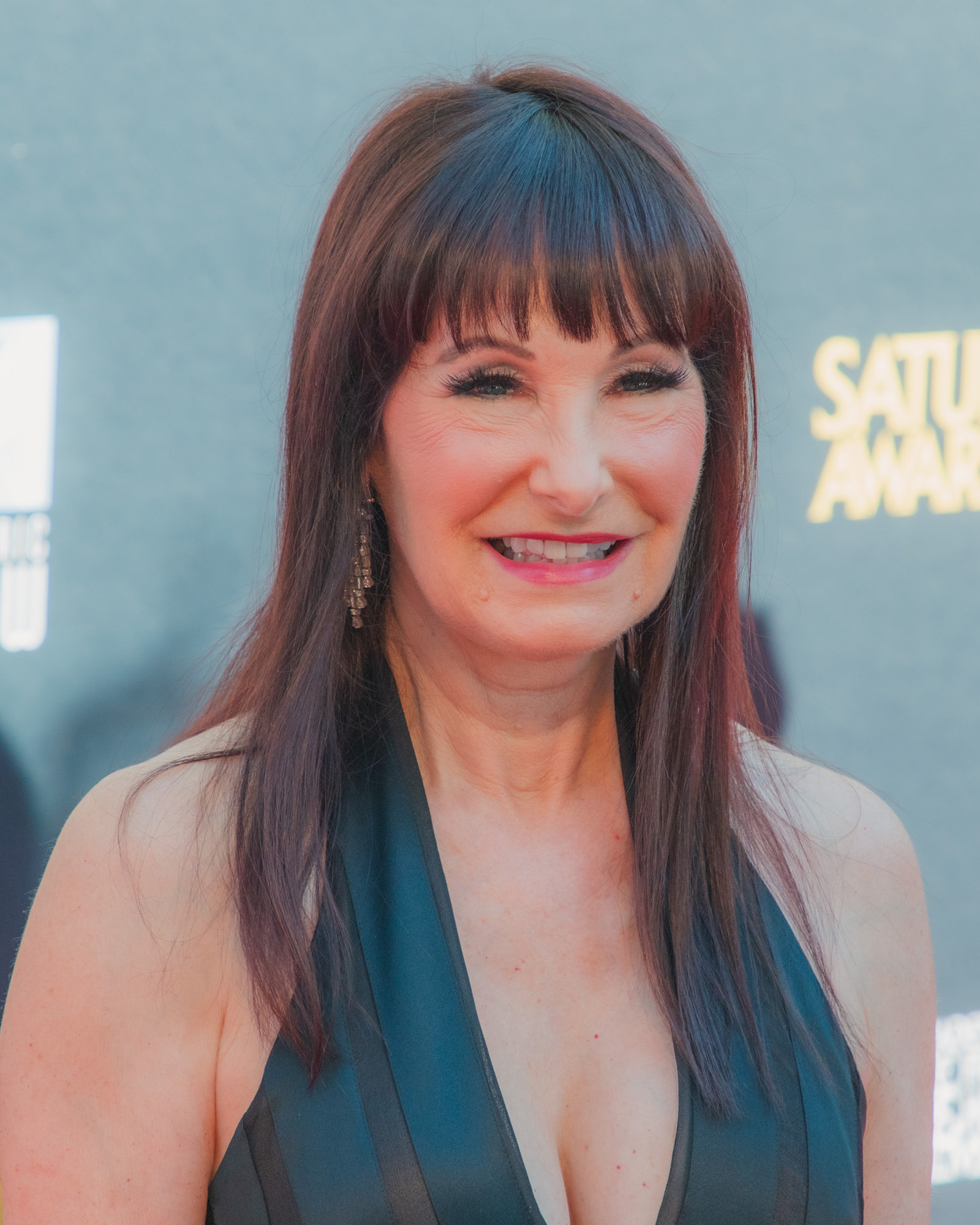
- Hurd in 2026
- Born: October 25, 1955 (age 70); Los Angeles, California, U.S.
- Education: Stanford University (BA)
- Occupations: Film and television producer
- Years active: 1980–present
- Spouses: James Cameron (m. 1985; div. 1989) Brian De Palma (m. 1991; div. 1993) Jonathan Hensleigh (m. 1995)
- Children: 1

Gale Anne Hurd (born October 25, 1955) is an American film and television producer, the founder of Valhalla Entertainment (formerly Pacific Western Productions), and a former recording secretary for the Producers Guild of America. Her notable works include The Terminator (1984), Aliens (1986), The Abyss (1989), Armageddon (1998), Mankiller (2017) and The Walking Dead (2010–2022).

== Early life ==
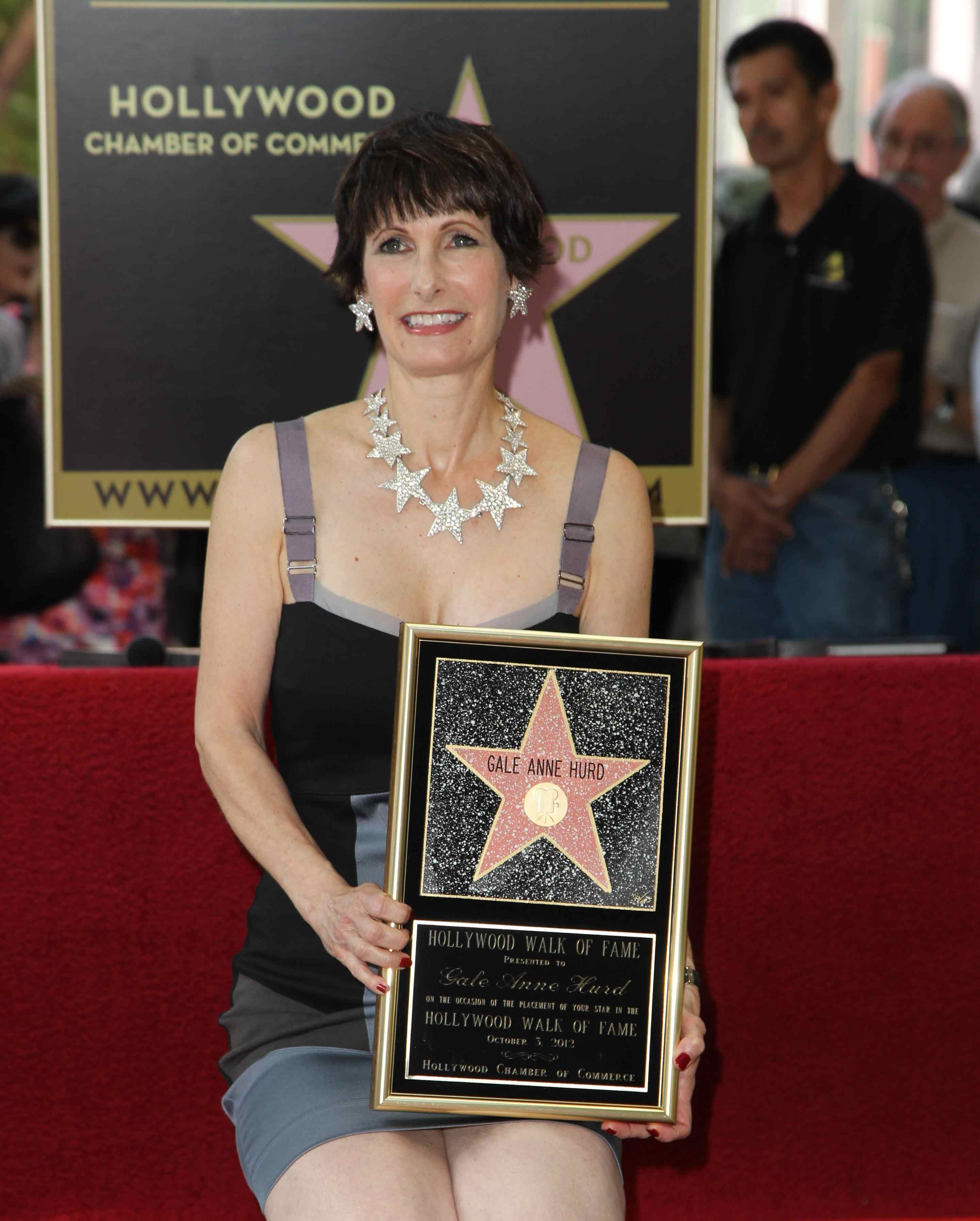
Hurd with her Hollywood Walk of Fame star, 2012

Gale Anne Hurd was born on October 25, 1955, in Los Angeles, California. She is the daughter of Lolita (née Jordan) and Frank E. Hurd, an investor. She grew up in Los Angeles and Palm Springs, California and graduated from Palm Springs High School in 1973. Hurd attended Stanford University, where she earned a Bachelor of Arts degree in economics and communications with a minor in political science in 1977.

== Career ==
Hurd began her career in the entertainment industry as an executive assistant to Roger Corman at New World Pictures. She quickly rose through the ranks, becoming involved in various aspects of production, and became the head of marketing. After co-producing her first film for Corman, Smokey Bites the Dust (1981), she launched her own production company in 1982.

Hurd's breakthrough came when she produced and co-wrote the 1984 science fiction film The Terminator, directed by James Cameron. The film was a commercial success and established Hurd as a prominent producer in Hollywood. The Terminator is Hurd's only real writing credit; she subsequently worked only as a producer or executive producer. She continued her collaboration with Cameron on Aliens (1986) and The Abyss (1989), both of which were successes at the box office.

Throughout the 1990s and 2000s, Hurd produced several successful films including Terminator 2: Judgment Day (1991), The Ghost and the Darkness (1996) and Armageddon (1998). Terminator 2 and Armageddon both claimed the top spots at the worldwide box office in their respective release years. Her additional major studio credits in the '90s and '00s include Tremors (1990), The Waterdance (1992), Hulk (2003), The Punisher, Æon Flux (2005), and The Incredible Hulk (2008).

In 2010, Hurd became an executive producer for the AMC television series The Walking Dead. The show, based on the comic book series of the same name, became a cultural phenomenon and one of the highest-rated series in cable television history. Hurd’s work on The Walking Dead earned her critical acclaim and numerous awards. Hurd also executive produced Walking Dead spin-offs Fear The Walking Dead (2015–23), Daryl Dixon (2023–present), The Ones Who Live (2024), and Dead City (2023–present).

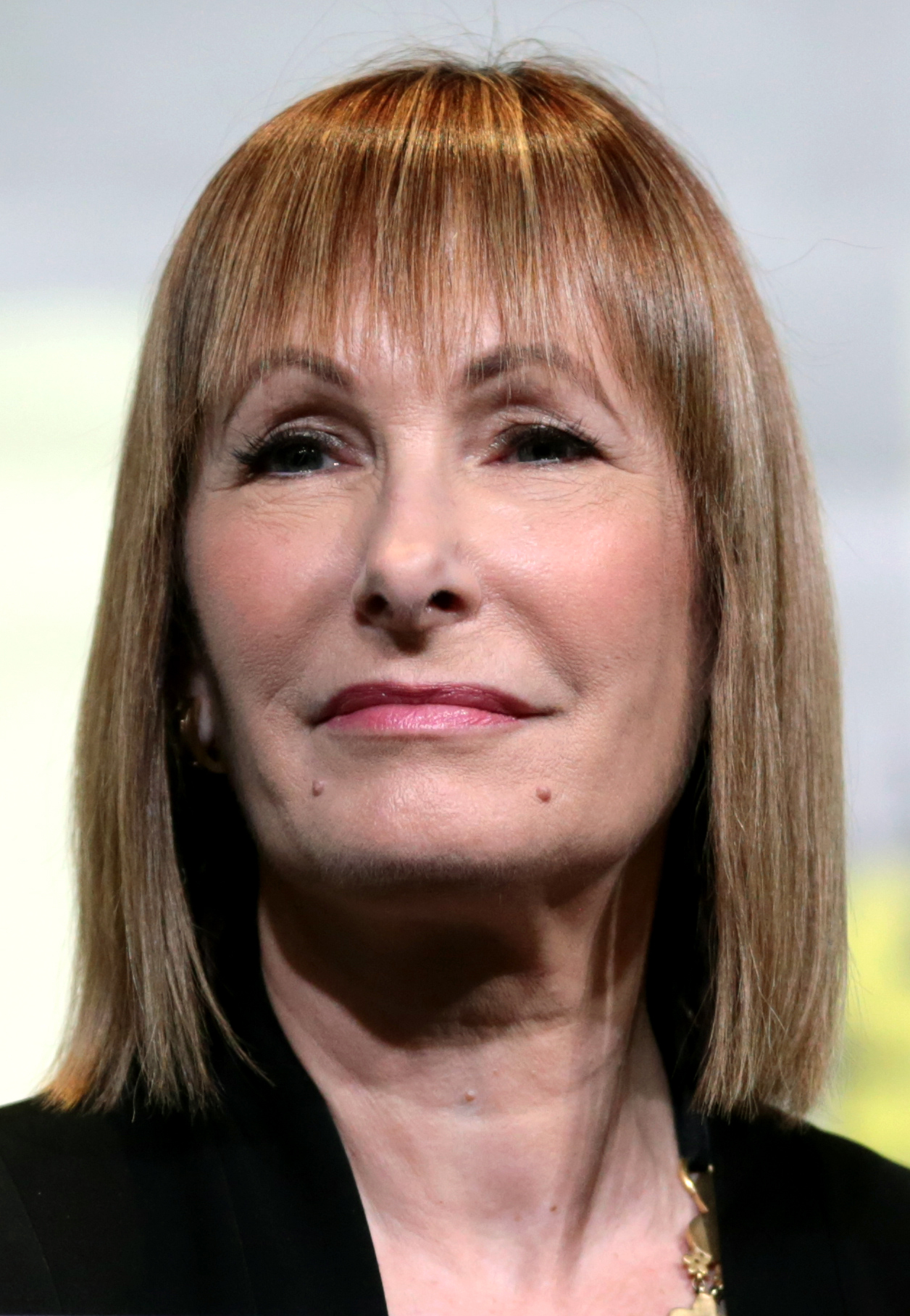
Hurd in 2016

Hurd has also produced several documentaries, including three PBS documentaries focused on Native Americans in partnership with Cherokee director Valerie Red-Horse Mohl: True Whispers: The Story of the Navajo Code Talkers, Choctaw Code Talkers, and Mankiller, celebrating the life of the late Wilma Mankiller, the first woman elected Principal Chief of the Cherokee Nation.

Hurd's most recent documentary is The YouTube Effect, directed by Alex Winter. The film premiered at the Tribeca Film Festival and was released in the US theatrically by Alamo Drafthouse Films.

== Personal life ==
In 1985, following their collaboration on The Terminator, Hurd married James Cameron. They divorced in 1989. Hurd then married Brian De Palma; the marriage later ended in divorce. They have one daughter.

== Filmography ==
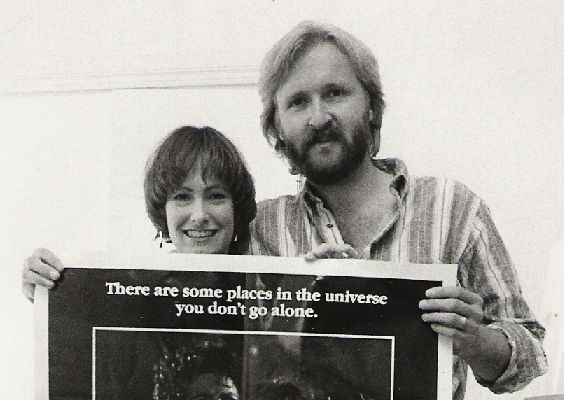
The producing team behind Aliens, James Cameron and Hurd

=== Films ===
She was producer for all films unless otherwise noted.

Year	Film	Credit	Notes
1981	Smokey Bites the Dust	Co-producer	
1983	Twilight Zone: The Movie		with John Landis & Steven Spielberg
1984	The Terminator		
1986	Aliens		
1988	Bad Dreams		
1988	Alien Nation		
1989	The Abyss		
1990	Downtown	Executive producer	
1990	Tremors	Executive producer	
1991	Terminator 2: Judgment Day	Executive producer	
1992	The Waterdance		
1992	Raising Cain		
1993	Man's Best Friend		with Steven Spielberg
1994	No Escape		
1994	Safe Passage		
1995	Bedtime Story		Short film
1995	Apollo 13		Uncredited
1996	The Ghost and the Darkness		
1997	The Relic		
1997	Dante's Peak		
1997	Switchback		
1998	Armageddon		
1998	Dead Man on Campus		
1999	Virus		
1999	Dick		
2002	Clockstoppers		
2002	True Whispers		
2003	Hulk		
2003	Terminator 3: Rise of the Machines	Executive producer	
2004	The Punisher		
2005	Æon Flux		
2007	Welcome to the Jungle		Direct-to-video film
2008	The Incredible Hulk		
2008	Punisher: War Zone		
2010	Choctaw Code Talkers		
2013	Very Good Girls	Executive producer	
2017	Mankiller	Executive producer	
2018	Hell Fest		
2022	The YouTube Effect		

==== Writer ====
Year	Film	Notes
1984	The Terminator	Co-writing with James Cameron

==== Production manager or production assistant ====
Year	Film	Credit	Notes
1979	Rock 'n' Roll High School	Production assistant	Uncredited
1980	Humanoids from the Deep	Production assistant	
1980	Battle Beyond the Stars	Assistant production manager	
1980	Alligator	Production assistant	Uncredited

==== Location management ====
Year	Film	Credit
1979	Island of the Fishmen	Location manager: Maui, additional sequences, US version

==== Music department ====
Year	Film	Credit	Notes
2004	The Punisher	Executive soundtrack producer	Uncredited

==== Executive counsultant ====
Year	Film
1996	Tremors 2: Aftershocks

=== Television ===
She was executive producer for all films unless otherwise noted.

Year(s)	Title	Credit	Notes
1991	Cast a Deadly Spell	Producer	Television movie
1994	Witch Hunt	Producer	Television movie
1994	The Making of Escape from Absolom		Television documentary special
1995	Sugartime		Television movie
2002–2003	Adventure Inc.		10 episodes
2004	The Coven		Television movie
2005	Breadwinners		Television movie
2009	The Pirate Code: Real Pirates		Television movie
2010	The Wronged Man		Television movie
2010–2022	The Walking Dead		177 episodes
2011	Last Man Standing		Television movie
2013	Horizon		Television movie
2015–2022	Talking Dead	Consulting producer	45 episodes
2015–2023	Fear the Walking Dead		113 episodes
2016	Hunters		13 episodes
2016–2018	Falling Water		20 episodes
2017–2018	Lore		10 episodes
2020–2021	The Walking Dead: World Beyond		20 episodes
2021	The Walking Dead: Origins	Consulting producer	Documentary, 4 episodes
2022	Tales of the Walking Dead		6 episodes
2022	The Walking Dead: The Making of the Final Season	Consulting producer	Television documentary special
2023	The Walking Dead: Dead City		6 episodes
2023–present	The Walking Dead: Daryl Dixon		12 episodes
2024	The Walking Dead: The Returrn		Television documentary special
2024	The Walking Dead: The Ones Who Live		6 episodes

==== Production coordinator ====
Year	Title	Notes
1980	The Georgia Peaches	Television movie

==== Camera and electrical department ====
Year	Title	Credit	Notes
1994	The Making of Escape from Absolom	Additional videography	Television documentary special

==== Consultant ====
Years	Title	Notes
1989–1990	Alien Nation	21 episodes

== Select awards and honors ==
Hurd has received numerous awards and accolades throughout her career, including:

Year	Organization	Award
1984	Saturn Awards	Best Writing, The Terminator
1992	Film Independent Spirit Awards	Best First Feature, The Waterdance
1993	Academy of Science Fiction, Fantasy & Horror Films	President's Award
1993	Saturn Awards	Best Producer
1994	Florida Film Festival	Enzian Award for Creative Achievement
1998	Women In Film	Crystal Award
2003	National Board of Review	Producer’s Award
2003	Taurus World Stunt Awards	Action Movie Producer Award
2004	Academy of Science Fiction, Fantasy & Horror Films	President's Award
2007	New York Women in Film & Television	Muse Award
2007	Charles Fitzsimons Award	Service to the Producers Guild
2012	Hollywood Walk of Fame	Star on the Hollywood Walk of Fame
2012	Motion Picture Sound Editors (MPSE) Filmmakers Award	Lifetime Achievement
2013	Deauville American Film Festival	Cartier Award
2013	Athena Film Festival	Laura Ziskin Lifetime Achievement Award
2015	Producers Guild	David O. Selznick Award in Motion Pictures
2015	Los Angeles Film Festival	Jaeger-LeCoultre Glory to the Filmmaker Award
2015	Society of Camera Operators	Distinguished Service Award
2015	Producers Guild	Visionary Award
2016	Society of Camera Operators	Lifetime Achievement Award
2017	Maoriland Film Festival	Best Documentary Feature, Mankiller
2017	Bozeman International Film Festival	Jury Award, Mankiller
2017	Comic-Con International	Inkpot Award
2017	Fangoria	Lifetime Achievement Award
2017	Tulsa American Film Festival	Best Documentary Feature Film, Mankiller
2017	Palm Springs International Film Festival	Audience Award, Best of Fest Selection, Mankiller
2017	Rome International Film Festival	Best Documentary Feature, Mankiller
2018	Screamfest	Career Achievement Award
2021	Locarno Film Festival	Raimondo Rezzonico Award - Best Independent Producer
2023	Visual Effects Society	Lifetime Achievement Award
2025	58th Sitges Film Festival	WomanInFan Grand Honorary Award
