= Jonathan Hensleigh =

American screenwriter and film director

- Born: Jonathan Blair Hensleigh; February 13, 1959 (age 67)
- Education: University of Massachusetts Amherst (1981); Tulane University Law School (J.D.)
- Occupations: Writer, producer, director
- Spouse: Gale Anne Hurd (m. 1995)

Jonathan Blair Hensleigh (born February 13, 1959) is an American screenwriter and film director, working primarily in the action-adventure genre, best known for writing films such as Jumanji, Die Hard with a Vengeance, and Armageddon, as well as making his own directorial debut with the 2004 comic book action film The Punisher.

== Early life ==
Hensleigh graduated from the University of Massachusetts Amherst in 1981 with a degree in history. He attended the University of Virginia School of Law, earned his J.D. from Tulane University Law School, and was admitted to the Massachusetts Bar in 1985. Before transition into writing, he worked as an attorney for seven years.

At the age of 31, Hensleigh began writing scripts and screenplays. He had previously written a novel and a three-act stage play but did not go to film school.

== Movie career ==
Hensleigh's start in the entertainment industry came writing episodes of the television series The Young Indiana Jones Chronicles. He received his first film credit in 1993's A Far Off Place, for which he wrote an early version of the script. His next two projects were Die Hard with a Vengeance and Jumanji, both of which were released in 1995. The Die Hard sequel was based on a spec script Hensleigh had originally conceived as a Brandon Lee action film before the actor's death, with the working title Simon Says. The script was considered for the fourth installment of the Lethal Weapon series before being picked up for Die Hard.

Hensleigh participated in writing for The Rock, which became the subject of a dispute with the Writers Guild of America. In this case, the spec script (by David Weisberg and Douglas Cook) was reworked by several writers, but other than the original team, Mark Rosner was the only one granted official credit by guild arbitration. Despite their work on the script, neither Hensleigh nor Aaron Sorkin were credited in the film. The director Michael Bay wrote an open letter of protest, in which he criticized the arbitration procedure as a "sham" and a "travesty". He said Hensleigh had worked closely with him on the movie and should have received screen credit.

Hensleigh worked with Bay again on the 1998 disaster film Armageddon, and officially received credit for the screenplay. He helped rewrite scripts for the Jerry Bruckheimer projects, Con Air (1997) and Gone in 60 Seconds (2000), receiving executive producer credit for those.

Hensleigh made his debut as a director with The Punisher in 2004, with the assistance of his wife, veteran Hollywood producer Gale Anne Hurd. He co-wrote the script with Michael France, based on the Marvel Comics character The Punisher. The film was shot on a tight schedule and with a relatively small budget.

At one point, he was set to write and direct Hulk, working on pre-production of that film for a year before pulling out. Some unrealized projects Hensleigh has worked on include a Gemini Man film and sequels to Jumanji and The Punisher. As of October 3, 2008, Hensleigh was developing the series Red Mars, which is based on the novel of the same name for AMC.

In 2011, Hensleigh wrote and directed Kill the Irishman, based on the book To Kill the Irishman: The War That Crippled the Mafia, about the Cleveland mobster Danny Greene who was active in the 1960s and 1970s.

== Filmography ==
Year	Title	Director	Writer	Notes
1992–1995	The Young Indiana Jones Chronicles	No	Yes	Television series (5 episodes)
1993	A Far Off Place	No	Yes	
1995	Die Hard with a Vengeance	No	Yes	
1995	Jumanji	No	Yes	
1997	The Saint	No	Yes	
1998	Armageddon	No	Yes	Also executive producer
2004	The Punisher	Yes	Yes	Directorial debut
2007	Next	No	Yes	
2007	Welcome to the Jungle	Yes	Yes	Also cinematographer; direct-to-video
2011	Kill the Irishman	Yes	Yes	
2021	The Ice Road	Yes	Yes	
2025	Ice Road: Vengeance	Yes	Yes	

Executive producer only

- Con Air (1997)
- Gone in 60 Seconds (2000)

Uncredited writing works

- The Rock (1996)
- Con Air (1997)
- Virus (1999)
- Gone in 60 Seconds (2000)
- Gemini Man (2019)
