= The Punisher (1989 film) =

1989 film directed by Mark Goldblatt

- Theatrical release poster
- Directed by: Mark Goldblatt
- Written by: Boaz Yakin
- Based on: Punisher by Marvel Comics
- Produced by: Robert Mark Kamen
- Starring: Dolph Lundgren; Louis Gossett Jr.; Jeroen Krabbé; Kim Miyori
- Cinematography: Ian Baker
- Edited by: Tim Wellburn
- Music by: Dennis Dreith
- Production companies: New World International; Marvel Entertainment
- Distributed by: Live Home Video (U.S.); Premiere Home Video (Australia)
- Release dates: October 5, 1989 (West Germany); April 25, 1991 (U.S.)
- Running time: 89 minutes
- Countries: United States; Australia
- Language: English
- Budget: $9-11 million
- Box office: $30 million

The Punisher is a 1989 vigilante action film directed by Mark Goldblatt from a screenplay by Boaz Yakin, based on the Marvel Comics character of same name. It stars Dolph Lundgren in the title role, a vigilante who wages war on the Mafia and Yakuza. Louis Gossett, Jr., Jeroen Krabbé, Kim Miyori and Barry Otto co-star.

The film had a troubled release due to original distributor New World Pictures's financial issues. It was released directly to home media in the United States, but grossed $30 million on a $9 million budget from an international theatrical run. It has since gained a cult following.

== Plot ==
Frank Castle is a former undercover police detective whose wife Julie and two daughters were killed 5 years earlier by a Mafia car bomb intended for Frank, who was presumed to be dead.

Castle has since become the city's infamous vigilante – known only as "The Punisher". He now lives in the city's labyrinthine sewer system, having assassinated 125 mobsters in the past 5 years. His work is known for special throwing knives engraved with a skull. Castle's sole ally in his one-man war against organized crime is Shake (taken from Shakespeare and "the shakes"), a stage-performer-turned derelict who typically speaks in rhyme.

The underworld families have become so weakened by the Punisher's guerrilla warfare that kingpin Gianni Franco is forced out of retirement. It is also revealed that he had ordered the car bomb that killed Castle's family. Franco plans to unify the decimated families. However, this attracts unwanted attention from the Yakuza, Asia's most powerful crime syndicate. Led by Lady Tanaka, the Yakuza decide to take over the Mafia families and all of their interests. To sway the mobsters to their cause, they kidnap their children and hold them for ransom.

Shake pleads with the Punisher to save the children, who are likely to be sold into the Arab slave trade regardless of whether the Mafia gives in to the demands. The Punisher attacks Yakuza businesses, warning that every day the children are gone will cost them money. The Yakuza later capture the Punisher and Shake and attempt to torture them into submission, but the Punisher breaks free and decides the only course of action is a direct rescue. He saves most of the children and commandeers a bus to get the kidnapped children to safety. Before the rescue, Tommy Franco, Gianni Franco's son, had been taken to Yakuza headquarters. The Police intercept the bus and arrest Frank after he saves the children.

While in custody, Castle is reunited with one of his old partners, who warns that his multiple killings will likely get him executed, to which Frank is ambivalent, stating that Frank is already dead. He is now just the Punisher. Soon afterward, Franco breaks Frank out of custody to aid him in saving his son from the Yakuza and destroying Lady Tanaka's plans. He expresses regret that the bomb killed Castle's family, but Frank insists that when they defeat the Yakuza, Franco will die.

Franco and the Punisher raid the Yakuza headquarters, eventually killing Lady Tanaka. Upon being reunited with his son, Franco betrays the Punisher, but the Punisher defends himself and kills Franco. Franco's son Tommy then threatens the Punisher for killing his father, but cannot bring himself to take revenge. Castle warns Tommy to "grow up to be a good man" and not follow his father's misdeeds. The police arrive, only to find no trace of the Punisher. Meanwhile, at his lair, Castle maintains that he will be waiting "in the shadows".

== Cast ==
- Dolph Lundgren as Frank Castle / The Punisher
- Louis Gossett Jr. as Detective Jake Berkowitz
- Jeroen Krabbé as Gianni Franco
- Kim Miyori as Lady Hideko Tanaka
- Nancy Everhard as Detective Samantha Leary
- Barry Otto as "Shake"
- Bryan Marshall as Dino Moretti
- Brian Rooney as Tommy Franco
- Kenji Yamaki as Sato
- Hirofumi Kanayama as Tomio
- Zoska Aleece as Tanaka's Daughter
- Todd Boyce as Tarrone
- Lani John Tupu as Laccone
- May Lloyd as Julie Castle
- Brooke Anderson as Annie Castle
- Holly Rogers as Felice Castle
- Noga Bernstein as Ginny
- Char Fontane as Laurie Silver
- Isao Hirata as Ito
- Donal Gibson as Bill
- Christian Manon as French Leader
- Larry McCormick as Newscaster
- Ken Wayne as Bartender

== Production ==
New World Pictures acquired the rights to The Punisher after acquiring Marvel Entertainment Group, the parent company of Marvel Comics, in 1986. However, this was the only film adaptation of a Marvel Comics character produced by New World. The Punisher was ultimately one of the last films to be produced by the company. The film does not utilize any other characters from the Punisher comics, other than the title character. A common misconception is that the Punisher's iconic skull logo was not included on Castle's costume due to rights issues. However, director Mark Goldblatt stated on the DVD commentary that the removal was a conscious creative choice, which he later regretted.

=== Writing ===
As Mark Goldblatt was finishing up with Dead Heat, New World sent Goldblatt an early draft of The Punisher script. Goldblatt had no prior knowledge of the Marvel Comics character the Punisher, and when he read the draft he equated it with "a Friday the 13th in sheep's clothing". Describing the film, Goldblatt said:

It was an instant turn-off. It was as if Jason had a cape. The script was totally dark, and the character was a complete psychopath. The story had potential, but I remember thinking "This script has many problems".

After Goldblatt voiced his thoughts to New World, he was informed the executives liked the script the way it was and broke off discussion to return to finishing up Dead Heat. Eventually someone within New World did decide the script had problems and producer Robert Mark Kamen was brought on board to rework the script. Once the script was offered to Goldblatt, he felt that many of his issues had been addressed by Kamen and agreed. After reading through what Punisher comics he could find, Goldblatt decided against incorporating the Punisher's costume as it would look silly and instead emphasized a "Road Warrior-chic" to showcase the character as a Utilitarian. Kamen stated with the script, he wanted to emphasize the "moral psychosis" of the character showing Frank Castle as both Punisher and punished. Kamen defended the Punisher's costume change in a 1988 statement to the Los Angeles Times, stating:

We were striving for realism . . . This guy lives in a sewer pipe with a Harley. He wouldn't take the time to get a Lycra suit with a skull on it. He's not the kind of guy who gets spiffed up before he goes out to kill. His clothes are utilitarian.

=== Casting ===
Arnold Schwarzenegger was considered for the role of Frank Castle, but his salary would have consumed the majority of the film's budget, so he was ruled out. Chuck Norris, Mickey Rourke, and Steven Seagal had also been floated as potential leads. Christopher Lambert had also been considered for the role of Frank Castle, but a recent ankle injury ruled him out for a physically demanding role. Despite longstanding rumors, Michael Paré was not the original choice for Frank Castle, and Paré has consistently said he was never even approached for the role.

Nicole Kidman was initially cast in a main role.

Eventually, Goldblatt and New World began considering Dolph Lundgren as Goldblatt felt he had the right profile and despite hesitance on Goldblatt's part of Lundgren's Swedish accent, those were quickly dissipated on their first meeting. When Lundgren was offered The Punisher, he was somewhat hesitant to get involved with it as he felt from the title it sounded too close to The Terminator or The Exterminator and wasn't sure he wanted to get involved with such a movie at that point in his career. However, upon reading the script Lundgren found the film much more engaging than he expected particularly welcoming the moments of humor and drama that he felt differentiated it from the other action films he'd been doing.

In 1989, Lundgren revealed that he was trying something different and that he liked the Punisher character. To get into character Lundgren dropped 25 pounds and kept himself on edge and aloof by isolating himself the majority of production to convey the character's intensity.

=== Filming ===
The original script was set in New York City, but this was changed due to the high cost of shooting in the city. Goldblatt considered shooting in Seattle, but was convinced to shoot in Australia, as New World Pictures had recently opened a subsidiary there.

The filming schedule was 53 days, shooting mainly in Sydney. Lundgren performed many of his own stunts.

== Music ==
A full orchestral score was composed and conducted by Dennis Dreith at the Warner Bros. soundstage in Burbank, California. A CD of the soundtrack was not released until July 19, 2004 (Perseverance Records, PRD006). The CD includes the complete multi-track stereo recording, and a 22-minute interview with the composer Dennis Dreith and the director Mark Goldblatt. Perseverance Records released a new 5.1 mix as a Super Audio CD, in collaboration with Tarantula Records. The American DVD release only contains a monaural soundtrack, though the film has Dolby Stereo. The 2013 German and UK Blu-ray/DVD editions were presented with 2.0 and 5.1 (Dolby Digital and DTS-HD MA) soundtracks. The UK disc was made from mono tracks.

== Release ==
The film was shot between August and September 1988. During production the producers indicated plans for a Spring 1989 release. The Punisher was released on home video in the United States on April 25, 1991.

=== Theatrical ===
The Punisher was given a worldwide theatrical release, except in the United States, Sweden, and South Africa. It was originally slated for a US release in August 1989, and trailers were created by New World. It premiered in Germany and France in October 1989 and was shown months later at the Los Angeles Comic Book and Sci-fi Convention in July 1990. However, the film never received a wide theatrical release in the United States due to New World's financial difficulties and its new owners not having an interest in theatrical distribution.

=== Home media ===
The film's US distribution rights were sold to Live Home Video, which released it direct-to-video on VHS and LaserDisc in April 1991. It finally premiered at the 2008 Escapism Film Festival in Durham, North Carolina where director Mark Goldblatt screened his own personal 35mm print. He showed that again in April 2009 at the Dolph Lundgren Film Fest hosted by the New Beverly theater.

In 2013, Koch Media released a hardcover media book, a BluRay and a DVD set that contains the theatrical cut, uncut version, and the extended workprint of the film. The set also includes audio commentary by Director Mark Goldblatt and a behind-the-scenes booklet. During the commentary, Goldblatt expresses regret at the removal of the Punisher's iconic skull logo.

== Reception ==
=== Box office ===
Overall, the film earned $30 million, on a budget of $9 million.

=== Critical response, cult following, and re-evaluation ===
On the review aggregator website Rotten Tomatoes, 24% of 17 critics' reviews are positive. The website's consensus reads: "Despite the seemingly indestructible Dolph Lundgren with a crossbow, The Punisher is a boring one-man battle with never-ending action scenes." Metacritic, which uses a weighted average, assigned the film a score of 63 out of 100, based on 4 critics, indicating "generally favorable" reviews.

Christopher Null gave the film 1 out of 5, stating the film was "marred by cheeseball sets and special effects, lame fight sequences, and some of the worst acting ever to disgrace the screen". MTV.com cited it as an example of a failed comic book film, complaining that the film omitted aspects of the character that made him compelling, and would have served better by following closer to the plot of the source material.

Kim Newman of Empire, gave three out of five stars in 2000. He felt it was harder than the recent film outputs by Marvel. While he felt that the movie lacked subtlety and could not turn Lundgren into a real actor, he found it highly entertaining and praised the strong female villains who gave the hero a hard time. His final thoughts were "at times a subversive, sub-Marvel thrill, it might be best to come back to this after the glut of goody-goody heroes due to bombard our screens has passed. Criticizing the film's storyline and acting, Time Out magazine concluded the film was "destructive, reprehensible, and marvelous fun".

TV Guide's movie guide gave the film three out of four stars, praising Lundgren's performance and comparing the characterization of the Punisher to that of Frank Miller's re-imagining of Batman in The Dark Knight Returns. They further praised the film's atmosphere, calling it "genuinely comic book-like, rather than cartoonish".

Tom Jolliffe of Flickering Myth explained that "in the years since release, The Punisher has increased its cult following. It was initially very popular on video, as most Lundgren releases were. Whilst critics and non-genre fans dismissed it as trash initially, it has often been re-appraised in the last decade, particularly. It has now found more appreciation for its finer points. Whilst some of the source changes (Castle dwelling in a sewer) and lack of skull may have irked some, as a late 80's action piece, it's solid. Add to that fine performances from the two villains of the piece, Kim Miyori and Jeroen Krabbe, and a committed performance from Louis Gossett Jr as Frank Castle's ex-partner. The supporting elements were all in place to prop up Lundgren, considered at the time as more athlete than actor. The result is that, even if it doesn't always feel like the Marvel view of Castle, Lundgren's version of a ghostly, haunted shell of the man he was, is effective."

Comic writer Garth Ennis, who wrote The Punisher 2004 series—cited by many as the best Punisher comics—called it the most honest adaptation of the character on a podcast in 2022, praising its "no compromise" portrayal of the character.

== Franchise ==
=== Canceled sequel ===
In 1990, New World promoted The Punisher II and an X-Men animated film, but the projects never materialized.

=== Reboot ===
In 2004, a reboot starring Thomas Jane, titled The Punisher, was released in the United States by Lions Gate Films, and internationally by Columbia TriStar Pictures.

=== Second reboot ===
In 2008, another reboot was made starring Ray Stevenson and titled Punisher: War Zone. It was released by Lions Gate Films, and internationally by Sony Pictures Releasing International.

== Other media ==
=== Video games ===
The advertisement of the 1990 tie-in video game |The Punisher features images from the film. Similarities between the film and the 1993 video game The Punisher include the assault on a casino by breaking through the ceiling and the female assassin.

=== Comic book ===
In June 1990, a 64-page comic adaptation of the film, written by Carl Potts and drawn by Brent Anderson, was released by Marvel.

=== Photo shoot ===
In 2019, Lundgren reprised the role in a photo shoot.
