= Michael France =

American screenwriter

- Born: January 4, 1962; St. Petersburg, Florida, U.S.
- Died: April 12, 2013 (aged 51); St. Pete Beach, Florida, U.S.
- Education: University of Florida; Columbia University
- Occupation: Screenwriter
- Spouse: Elizabeth France
- Children: 3

Michael France (January 4, 1962 – April 12, 2013) was an American screenwriter. He is best remembered for writing the screenplays for Cliffhanger (1993), the James Bond film GoldenEye (1995), and the comic book films Hulk (2003), The Punisher (2004), and Fantastic Four (2005).

== Early life ==
France was born in St. Petersburg, Florida. As a kid he loved comics and movies, which may have inspired him to write. He attended the University of Florida in the early 1980s, working as a projectionist at a small movie theater in Gainesville and participating in its programming. He earned a graduate degree from the film school at Columbia University in New York City.

== Career ==
France moved to Los Angeles, California, where he sold the script for Cliffhanger. He later wrote the scripts for GoldenEye, Hulk, The Punisher, and Fantastic Four. He also did some uncredited work on The World Is Not Enough. France bought the historic Beach Theater in St. Petersburg, Florida; built in 1939, the theater is known for its screening of independent and foreign films.

== Personal life ==
France lived in St. Pete Beach, Florida, with his wife, Elizabeth, and their three children, Annabelle and Carolynn, twins, age 10 at the time, and Thomas, age 15. He died on April 12, 2013, after complications resulting from diabetes. He was 51 years old.
