= Deathmate =

Comic book

Deathmate Prologue, art by Jim Lee and Bob Layton.

Deathmate is a six-part comic book crossover series between Valiant Comics and Image Comics published in 1993–94. The series is remembered for its negative impact on comic book retailers and the industry as a whole due to its late, over-ordered but poorly-selling books.

Comics historian Jason Sacks described it as the first major comic universe crossover since the Marvel Comics / DC Comics crossover The Uncanny X-Men and The New Teen Titans was published in 1982.

The plot revolved around a chance interdimensional meeting of two characters, Solar from Valiant and Void from Image's WildC.A.T.s. The two became lovers, but their joining would mean the destruction of both the Image Universe and Valiant Universe.

== Background ==
The project was the result of a series of conversations Image Comics co-founder Jim Lee and then Valiant Comics publisher Steve Massarsky and Vice President of Marketing Jon Hartz had in 1992 over the possibility of a crossover. In late 1992, Lee, Image Comics co-founder Rob Liefeld, Massarsky, and Hartz met in Kansas City and agreed that each company would create two issues of the crossover, and jointly provide personnel to create the two book-end issues, Deathmate Prologue and Deathmate Epilogue. In a retrospective interview on the rise and fall of Valiant, former editor-in-chief Bob Layton claimed he was not consulted on the project. "Deathmate was thrust upon us because (Steve) Massarsky and Jim Lee were best buddies at the time and had privately arranged the crossover," Layton said.

The four main issues were designated by color rather than issue numbers (namely Yellow, Blue, Black, and Red), so they could be read in any order to accommodate any publishing delays. Created at the peak of the comic book speculator boom, the project was heavily promoted and sold hundreds of thousands of copies, but was beset with production delays on the Image Comics side. To ensure the prologue shipped on time, Layton said he had to fly to Los Angeles and literally sit on Liefeld's doorstep until Liefeld finished his penciled art for the Deathmate Prologue. Layton inked the artwork himself in an Anaheim hotel room. The Yellow and Blue issues, produced by Valiant, shipped on time in July and early August respectively. Black, produced by Lee's studio, was solicited for late summer but didn't ship until October. Red, produced by Liefeld's studio, shipped in December, four months late, and after Deathmate Epilogue.

Only half of the six Image partners chose to participate. Erik Larsen, Jim Valentino, and Todd McFarlane were not involved, although McFarlane's character Al Simmons makes a brief appearance in Deathmate Red.

== Plot synopsis ==
In a world that had been long since become a terrible place, Solar reluctantly granted the wish of his lifelong companion, Gayle Nordheim to dissipate the lifegiving energy that had kept her alive and young for so long. So unable to contain his grief over her death, Solar was literally split in two. The remaining Solar vanished into a life of seclusion while the new persona went off to find other planes of reality to explore.

There, in a dimension between what is real and unreal, he encountered a creature of incredible power, a woman from a distant universe, Void. The two fell in love, a love that wounded all time literally. Upon consummating, their combined energies fused, unwarping the fabric of time, spiraling backwards and eating away at their distinct timelines. In an instant, things were not as they should be: heroes fought alongside those who had been their enemies in a different world; great men who would bring justice to the world died horrible, untimely deaths. Only men with the gift of foresight, Geoff McHenry and Prophet, knew that all was not as it should be. Where they had seen a future so clearly before, there was now nothing.

Geoff and Prophet are resolved to gather the heroes of this amalgamated universe together to fight the battle to save all time.

== Aftermath ==
Deathmate had a negative impact on retailers that heavily ordered the series only to find that fans lost interest by the time the books shipped. Each of the four main titles carried a cover price of $4.95, which was more than the average comic book at the time. As a result, retailers had an unusually large amount of cash flow tied up in the titles that they could not recoup until the books hit the shelves.

Deathmate Red shipped so late that Diamond Distributors canceled the original solicitation and gave retailers a chance to slash their orders. The Valiant-produced Deathmate books (Prologue, Blue, and Yellow) had print runs of over 700,000 copies, but by the time Deathmate Red was released, it had a print run of 250,000, although retailers were nonetheless left with many unsold copies. At the time, comic book distributors would only allow unsold books to be returned if they were six months late. Retailers dealt constantly with late books from Image, which indirectly caused some comic book shops to close. Partially due to the lateness of Image publications, the window was eventually decreased to two months.

"Many consider Deathmate the comic book that singlehandedly put an end to the industry's prosperous times and the biggest reason why so many comic book stores closed its doors for good," comics historian Jason Sacks wrote. "In truth, there was plenty of blame to go around."

In a retrospective interview on the rise and fall of Valiant, former editor-in-chief Bob Layton called the project an "unmitigated disaster." "Not necessarily in the numbers, but in the consequences of their release...I think that Deathmate sounded the beginning of the problems, and when Image couldn't get their side of the cross-over out on time, it hurt everyone," he said.

== Trading cards ==
As a cross-promotion, two trading card companies also did a cross-over, Upper Deck and Topps. Upper Deck produced the Valiant cards featuring only characters and art from their corresponding titles. The Topps set would be based on the Deathmate Red and Black issues and would include artwork from Rob Liefeld and Jim Lee. This set was to be 90 cards in total and would feature two types of chase cards: A prismatic laminate covering called "Deathmatrix" and a chromium covering entitled "Deathchrome". However, because of the deadline problems with Image Comics, Topps ended up backing out of the contract. Upper Deck’s Valiant Deathmate cards did not fare well on the market.

== Titles ==
Preview Issues
Green sold with Comic Defense comic bags or Advance Comics magazine
Same story and cover, but with the logo of the sponsor in the corner
Story: Solar and Prophet battle Erica Pierce

Orange and Pink
sold with Previews magazine
Same story, but different covers
Story: Archer chases Shadowman while Grifter chases Archer

Books from Valiant

- Deathmate Prologue

"A Love to End All Time"
Story: Bob Layton
Pencils: Barry Windsor-Smith
Inks: Jim Lee

"Universal Truth"
Story: Bob Layton
Pencils: Rob Liefeld
Inks: Bob Layton with Danny Miki and Dan Panosian

- Deathmate Yellow

"Jerked Through Time" (featuring characters from Archer & Armstrong and WildC.A.T.s)
Story: Mike Baron
Pencils: Bernard Chang
Inks: Rodney Ramos

"Cat and Mouse" (featuring characters from Ninjak and WildC.A.T.s)
Story: Jorge Gonzalez.
Pencils: Don Perlin
Inks: Mike Manley

"The Dying Game" (featuring characters from H.A.R.D. Corps and WildC.A.T.s)
Story: David Michelinie and Bob Layton
Pencils: Mike Leeke
Inks: Tom Ryder

"Revelations and Recruitments" (featuring characters from Shadowman and WildC.A.T.s)
Story: Bob Hall
Pencils: Mark Moretti
Inks: John Dixon

- Deathmate Blue

"Battlestone vs. Magnus Outlaw!" (featuring characters from Brigade and Magnus: Robot Fighter)
Story: John Ostrander
Pencils: Jim Calafiore
Inks: Ralph Reese

"Secret Forces" (featuring characters from Secret Weapons and Cyberforce)
Story: Joe St. Pierre
Pencils: Sean Chen
Inks: Kathryn Bolinger

"Sacrifices" (featuring characters from Harbinger, Brigade, and Cyberforce)
Story: Maurice Fontenot
Pencils: Howard Simpson
Inker: Gonzalo Mayo

"Supremely Darque" (featuring characters from Solar and Supreme)
Story: Kevin VanHook
Pencils: Peter Grau
Inker: Jimmy Palmiotti

Books from Image

- Deathmate Black (featuring characters from Gen^{13}, WildC.A.T.s, Turok: Dinosaur Hunter, Cyberforce, and X-O Manowar)

Story: Brandon Choi and Eric Silvestri
Pencils: Brandon Peterson, Brett Booth, Marc Silvestri, J. Scott Campbell (as Jeffrey Scott),
Scott Clark, Greg Capullo, Jim Lee, and Whilce Portacio
Inks: Scott Williams, Sal Regla, Alex Garner, and Trevor Scott

- Deathmate Red (featuring characters from Youngblood, Bloodshot and Eternal Warrior)

Story and Pencils: Rob Liefeld
Script: Eric Stephenson
Additional pencils: Jeff Matsuda, Rich Horie, Dan Fraga, Cedric Nocon, Dan Pacella, Anthony Winn, Marat Mychaels
Inks: Danny Miki, Jon Sibal, Marlo Alquiza

- Deathmate Epilogue

Story: Bob Layton
Pencils: Marc Silvestri and Joe Quesada
Inks: Bob Layton and Scott Williams

== Collected issues ==
As of now the issues of the crossover have yet to be collected. This is likely due to the (often confusing) truth of the involved characters being owned, licensed, and printed by a large number of separate publishers. The respective owners and publishers consist of Gold Key Comics, Image Comics, Valiant Comics, Wildstorm Comics, DC Comics, Dynamite Comics, and Dark Horse Comics.
