= List of Valiant Comics characters =

There are approximately 1,500 characters in the Valiant universe.

== # ==
- 1-A

== A ==
- Aesha
- Alaric
- Alloy
- Amelia
- Ms. Ando
- Andromeda
- Andy
- Dutchess Angelique D’Terre
- Animalia
- Anvil (Samuel Coleman)
- Archer (Obadiah Archer)
- Armstrong (Aram)
- Aric of Dacia (X-O Manowar)
- Aristides
- Armorines
- Atomus
- Ax

== B ==
- Balaam
- Bazooka
- Bear
- Benito Carboni
- Doctor Bev
- Big Mean Monkey Head
- Bionisaurs (Dinosoid)
- Blast
- Bloodshot (Angelo Mortalli)
- Blowhard
- Blur a.k.a. Parker Matthews
- Boaz
- Boogieman
- Buck McHenry (Geomancer of 1889)

== C ==
- Calamity a.k.a. Jane Ngo
- Camouflage
- Carmen Ruiz a.k.a. Carmen Mirage (Crazy Legs)
- Carrera
- Cinder [Marco Rosetti]
- Chan
- Charly Donovan
- Chichak
- Claiburne
- Clay McHenry
- Clemenceau
- Coach Heinz
- Cobrah
- Colin King (Ninjak)
- Constance Allen
- Costantino
- Crescendo
- Crimson Dragon

== D ==
- Daddy
- Danae Delsol
- Daryl
- Deidre Dacia
- Destroyer a.k.a. Solar the Destroyer
- Devon
- Divinity
- Doctor Eclipse (Fred Bender)
- Doctor Lawrence Heyward
- Doctor Mirage (Hwen Mirage)
- Doctor Mirage (Shan Fong Mirage)
- Doctor Ralphonse Pinto
- Doctor Silk
- Diseased Squirrel
- Dragonfly

== E ==
- Earth Angel (Teresa)
- Eddy Donovan
- Eel
- Elya
- Elzy
- Emil Sosa
- Enrico
- Emile N’Dour
- Erica Pierce (Mothergod)
- Eternal Warrior (Gilad Anni-Padda, Gilad Abrams)

== F ==
- Fire Angel (Gianna)
- Fitzhugh
- Flamingo (Charlene Dupre)
- Flashbulb
- Flatline
- Flo
- Fluffy
- Fort
- Frost
- Frank Arcko
- Frendy

== G ==
- Gafti
- Gamin
- General Cheng
- Geomancers
- Geoff McHenry (Geomancer of 1992)
- Ghost
- Glyder [Leigh Rosetti]
- Graal
- Grandmother
- Gregor Latinev
- Gryffen
- Gumball
- Gunslinger (Charles Palmer) of H.A.R.D. Corps

== H ==
- H8
- Hammerhead (Chris Eastman) of H.A.R.D. Corps
- Harbinger, The
- Harbingers
- Harry Donovan
- Hazey
- Headbutt
- Doctor Heyward
- Hook
- Hotshot
- Hotwire
- Hydrich

== I ==
- Ilysee
- Immortal Enemy
- Inga Dacia
- Ishmael
- Ivar, the Timewalker
- Izak

== J ==
- Jack Boniface (Shadowman)
- Jillian Alcott
- Jim
- Reverend Joe Earl Archer
- Joe Irons
- Jolt (Victoria Martinelli)
- June Schneider
- Juan Javier Caldone

== K ==
- Ken Clarkson
- King Crab
- Kris Hathaway
- Krytos

== L ==
- Lana Heffner
- Lauren (the stripper)
- Law
- Laws
- Lazlo Noel
- Leeja Clane
- Livewire (Amanda McKee)
- Longhunter (Israel Crockett)
- Lord of the Fleas
- Lounge Lizard
- Lucinda Mendez (Geomancer of 2062)
- Lummox
- Lump
- Lydia Polk

== M ==
- M’rrha (Maria)
- Mad Cow
- Mademoiselle Noir
- Magnus, Robot Fighter
- Magskrag
- Mahmud
- Makiko Minashi
- Mallak
- Maniac of H.A.R.D. Corps
- Malev Emperor
- Malevolents
- Mallik
- Map Giver
- Marcia
- Marty
- Mary Donovan
- Master Darque
- Mama Nettie
- Max St. James
- Medoc the Red
- Megan
- Midnight Earl (Earl Simkus)
- Mimsey
- Mitch Donovan
- Monique Lynn Levingston
- Mothergod
- Mosquito
- Mother Nike
- Mr. Twister

== N ==
- Nettie
- Neville Alcott
- Ninjak
- N.I.O.

== O ==
- Obadia
- Outback

== P ==
- Para-Man
- Para-Man 2
- Paul Bouvier (Alloy)
- Paul N’Dours
- Perp of H.A.R.D. Corps
- Peter Stanchek (Pete) a.k.a. Sting
- Phaze
- Pol-Bekhara
- Prather
- Prick
- Prince Albert
- Psi-Lords
- Puff
- Punk Mambo (Victoria Greaves-Trott)

== Q ==
- Quantum
- Queen

== R ==
- Rachel Hopson
- Rage
- Rai
- Rampage
- Randy Cartier
- Ravenrok
- Ravenwing
- Regan Howell
- Rebound a.k.a. Zach Helvin
- Rentaro Nakadai (41st Rai)
- Rexo
- Ripsaw
- Robert Folly
- Rock (Joe Nicoletti)
- Rockland Tate (Geomancer of the 41st Century)
- Roku
- Rolf (Dacia)
- Rollergirl
- Rotwak
- Rubberneck

== S ==
- Samedi
- Sandria Darque
- Sarathan
- Sarus
- Savage (Kevin Sauvage)
- Scott
- Screen
- Secret Weapons
- Shadowman
- Shakespeare (Aaron Brillstein) of H.A.R.D. Corps
- Shanhara (original X-O Manowar Armor)
- Shatiqua
- Siamese Fighting Fish
- Silk
- Silvio
- Sinclaire (Para-Man 2)
- Sisters of Doom
- Skammrs
- Skindome
- Slagger
- Sniper
- Solar
- Sonix (Gaylord Butch McFadden)
- Sosa The Undying
- Sparrow
- Spider Alien
- Spikeman
- Spuds
- Spylocke (Ananse)
- Sting
- Stronghold (Edward T. Sedgwick)
- Storm Angel (Maria)
- Suki Seki
- Superstar (Ricky Silver)
- Swallow

== T ==
- T-1
- Takao Konishi
- Takashi Nakadai
- Tank
- Taser
- Tashi Khatun (Geomancer)
- Tekla
- Teresa Giardino
- Tetsuwan Nucleo
- Thelma Archer
- Thomas Morgan
- Thumper
- Timbuc (York Timbuc)
- Ting (a.k.a. Master Ting)
- Tintorrera
- Todd Bevins
- Tohru Nakadai (42nd Rai)
- Tonguelasher
- Torque (John Torkelson)
- Torque Clane (Magnus's son)
- Toyo Harada
- Trenchmouth
- Trinity Angels
- Tsetse
- Turok
- Twin Bill
- Two-Face
- Tyger (Mira Choudhury)

== U ==
- Über-Sasquatch
- Ularu a.k.a. The White Goddess
- Una
- Uzzi the Clown

== V ==
- Vekter
- Vincent Van Goat
- Vise
- The Visitor
- Victor Zeramiah Clane
- Viva

== W ==
- War Mother
- Wassily Borkov a.k.a. The White Wolf
- Weasel
- Welt
- William Ackerman
- Willie Maye (Mae)
- Willis (Willy)
- Willow Talltree
- Winged Cerebrum
- Wipeout of H.A.R.D. Corps
- Wisp
- Woody (Henderson a.k.a. Woody Van Chelton)
- Woody 2
- Wormfeeder

== X ==
- XL a.k.a. Christine Helvin
- X-O Manowar
- X-O Commando (Kazuyo Nakadai)
- Xyrkol

== Y ==
- Yuri Pierce (Geomancer of 2900)

== Z ==
- Zephyr (Faith Herbert)
