= Ninjak =

- Textless variant cover of Ninjak #7 (September 2015); Art by Stephen Segovia

Publication information
- Publisher: Valiant Comics
- First appearance: As Colin King: Bloodshot #6 (July 1993); As Ninjak: Bloodshot #7 (August 1993)
- Created by: Mark Moretti; Joe Quesada

In-story information
- Alter ego: Valiant: Colin King; Acclaim: Denny Meechum, Tatsuo
- Team affiliations: Unity Team; MI-6; Weaponeer Organization
- Notable aliases: Ninja-K
- Abilities: Genius level intellect; Skilled marksman, swordsman, computer hacker; Olympic-level gymnast, athlete, acrobat; Expert in military strategy, hand-to-hand combat, espionage; Master martial artist; High-tech tools

Ninjak is a fictional superhero appearing in comic books published by Valiant Comics. The original incarnation of the character was created by Mark Moretti and Joe Quesada, The character was first introduced as a ninja and spy in the Valiant Comics series Bloodshot in July, 1993. His appearance in that series served to encourage interest ahead of his own self-titled series, which began in November that same year (although Ninjak vol. 1 #1 has a cover date of February, 1994). Acclaim Entertainment bought out Valiant Comics in 1996, after which Ninjak and other characters were rebooted. The Acclaim Ninjak series lasted only a year. Valiant Comics later returned and rebranded as Valiant Entertainment, and a new version of Ninjak, more in-line with the original incarnation, was introduced to readers in 2012.

The Acclaim Comics version of Ninjak is a teenager who gains the combined abilities of multiple ninja warriors by unlocking a puzzle in a video game. In both his original Valiant Comics incarnation and Valiant Entertainment reboot incarnation, Ninjak or "Ninja-K" is Colin King, a British child of wealth who becomes a master spy and ninja, then works as a special "freelance" operative for MI-6. Though not having any superhuman abilities, Ninjak's skills, intelligence, high-tech weaponry, and ninja expertise make him one of the most formidable characters in the Valiant Universe. He has also been a member of the Unity team, a group composed of powerful Valiant heroes.

The first Ninjak series was very popular. The first issue sold close to 1 million copies and was placed number one on Wizard magazine's Top Ten Hottest Comics of the month article in February 1994. Like many popular American comic series, the Ninjak comics have been translated into a number of languages, including German, Italian, Spanish, Norwegian, Filipino, and Chinese.

== Publication history ==
=== Original Valiant continuity ===
The original incarnation of Ninjak, who is secretly a ninja and spy named Colin King, is introduced in the original Bloodshot series in 1993. This allowed readers to become interested in the character soon before the launch of his self-titled series in November 1993. According to Capital City Distribution, Diamond Comic Distributors, and Heroes World Distribution, Ninjak vol. 1 #1 was the American best-selling comic of November 1993, making it the first Valiant publication to hit number one in sales. Valiant vice president Jon Hartz cited the comic's wraparound chromium cover as the chief reason for its strong sales. This series ran for 26 issues, from February 1994 to November 1995.

=== Acclaim Comics continuity ===
After Valiant Comics was purchased by video game company Acclaim Entertainment in 1996, many of its characters were rebooted in new comics. The relaunched series, Ninjak volume 2, was created by writer Kurt Busiek and artists Neil Vokes and Michael Avon Oeming. In the Acclaim comic book universe, a teenager named Denny Meechum is endowed with the combined abilities of several ninja warriors by unlocking a puzzle in a video game. The second series lasted 12 issues, running from March 1997 to February 1998.

=== Valiant Entertainment continuity ===
When Acclaim went out of business in 2004, Valiant Comics was rebranded as Valiant Entertainment and bought the rights to its old characters, including Ninjak. In the relaunch of the Valiant Universe, Ninjak first appeared in X-O Manowar vol. 3 #5 (2012). He first acts as antagonist to Aric, a Visigoth warrior who gains power by using an alien made suit of armor called X-O Manowar. By the end of the story arc, Ninjak becomes Aric's ally.

In November 2013, Ninjak began appearing as a regular lead character in the series Unity, written by Matt Kindt. The new ongoing series Ninjak volume 3 began in March 2015, with Kindt as the series writer. The series artists were Clay Mann and Butch Guice. The series divided attention between Ninjak's present-day adventures and flashbacks to his origin and training. The series revealed that MI-6 has had a secret "ninja programme" since World War I, starting with an agent named Ninja-A (King was not said to be officially designated Ninja-K, with "Ninjak" now being a nickname). Ninjak vol. 3 ended in 2016. A follow-up series written by Christos Gage, titled Ninja-K, was published from 2017 to 2018. This series focused not only on Ninjak but featured his predecessors in MI-6's secret ninja program.

Ninjak vol. 4, was launched in July 2021 and written by Jeff Parker and illustrated by Javier Pulido. The final issue, #4, was partly redrawn by Beni Lobel.

== Character History ==
Valiant Masters: Ninjak Volume 1 – Black Water collects Ninjak (1994) #1–6, #0, and #00

=== Valiant Comics ===
In the original universe of Valiant Comics, Colin King is the wealthy son of a master spy working for MI-6. Raised in East Asia, he feels like an outsider. When his father is killed by rival agent Iwatsu, King decides to bring the killers to justice. After training as a ninja for years, King adopts the identity of Ninjak and becomes a special operative and enforcer for the Weaponeer organization, which creates specialized weapons and provides security services. With Weaponeer resources, Ninjak has access to a variety of high-tech gadgets and customized weapons. He likewise uses Weaponeer facilities to create tools for himself, such as a costume that can change color and a weaponized scarf.

The Weaponeer organization is targeted by the terrorist Dr. Augustus Silkowski, also known as Doctor Silk, and his group Webnet, an illegal international consortium of technical, industrial, and financial institutions. Eventually, Webnet wipes out virtually all of Weaponeer's resources and personnel, with only Ninjak surviving. King considers retiring his Ninjak identity but is convinced by his father's old MI-6 colleague Neville Alcott to work as a freelance agent for British Intelligence.

Ninjak's assignments and adventures lead to him encountering the nanite-empowered warrior Bloodshot, the immortal named Gilad (also known as the Eternal Warrior), the Geomancer named Geoff McHenry, and Aric, a Visigoth warrior who gains power by wearing an alien suit of armor called X-O Manowar. During other adventures, Ninjak meets people born with superhuman abilities (known in the Valiant Comics world as "psiots" or "harbingers") and the wealthy Toyo Harada, head of the Harbinger Foundation.

=== Acclaim Comics ===
In the Acclaim Comics continuity, "Ninjak" is the fictional title character of a popular video game produced by Acclaim Entertainment. A great fan of the game is high school student Denny Meechum, a self-conscious, self-described "geek", who has no friends outside of his four sisters and his classmate Town. Denny has a crush on Tian, a comic book store clerk he regularly encounters, but is terrified to reveal his feelings. After solving a specific challenge within the Ninjak video game, Danny is struck by a beam of magical energy. From that point on, when he says the video game catchphrase "I call on the power of Ninjak," he is transformed into an older, athletic, Asian man and gains mastery of martial arts, acrobatics, and a variety of hand-held weaponry. To transform back to his normal, teenage self, he simply has to say the game's other tagline "Ninjak forever." Later, Denny is able to transform back and forth simply by concentrating.

Denny learns that several other people are being imbued with the powers and personalities of the game's villains, the Dark Dozen. As Ninjak, he confronts and battles each of the villains while investigating the origins of his new transformation ability. Soon after gaining his power, Denny encounters Colin King, a manipulative British government operative. King and Ninjak's path cross when they team-up to stop an operation by the villainous organization Webnet.

Defeating his foes causes Denny to have greater confidence in his personal life, which inadvertently inspires Town's girlfriend Shelley to develop a romantic interest in him. Denny is still determined to ask out the older Taina and takes a job at the comic shop so they can become better acquainted. Meanwhile, Denny's activities as Ninjak complicate his life, as he is forced to sometimes ignore his responsibilities at school and lie to his parents and sisters. Eventually, he admits the truth to his mother, though she decides not to tell her husband, Colonel Sean Meechum of the US Air Force.

Eventually, Denny learns the true origin of the game and its transformational abilities. In Ancient Japan, a warlord named Akuma gained magical power and sought world domination, using his magic to create demonic soldiers. An order of warrior monks defied Akuma and finally defeated him. Turning his magic against him, the monks imprison Akuma into an other-dimensional prison. Fearful the villains will one day return, the order continues training and preparing for battle. Through an unrevealed means, the monks are able to live for centuries, with one of them still surviving into the modern day. The remaining monk, Master Yasuiti, decides a new, young warrior will be needed to fight Akuma, one who is intelligent as well as physically powerful. Yasuiti invests in the creation of different games over the years that are designed to test its players, seeking one with the right mindset and cleverness. Finally, the monk invests in the creation of a game that marketing decides to call Ninjak. When Denny solves the game's final challenge, the secret test selects him as a worthy recruit. The surviving monk Yasuiti explains that Denny himself is Ninjak and he is not "possessed" by any particular person's spirit when he transforms, simply transformed to resemble a fictional character and then imbued with the combined abilities of the warrior monks who originally fought Akuma. Yasuiti says Akuma is somehow making the Dark Dozen real in order to feed his power and bide time until he can free himself from his prison, which is now connected to the video game. Yasuiti says Denny will have to kill him, but the teenager argues there are ways to stop villains without killing them.

While battling the Dark Dozen, Denny is eventually sued by Acclaim Entertainment for infringing on the trademark of their character. Later on, Akuma frees himself and attacks. During the battle, it is revealed that Master Yasuiti lied when he claimed Denny was imbued with the skills of many and wasn't "possessed" in any way by a single, living warrior. The truth is that when Denny becomes Ninjak, he adopts the appearance and abilities of Yasuiti's brother Tatsuo, another warrior monk whose spirit was later connected to the video game. During the final battle with Akuma, Tatsuo and Denny are separated, now existing as separate, living entities, with Tatsuo still dressed as Ninjak and Denny now only having his original form and abilities. Tatsuo decides to kill Akuma and the Dark Dozen, but Denny argues against it, believing that the Dark Dozen have human hosts just as Ninjak did. Denny tells him the strategies necessary to defeat each enemy. After Akuma is defeated, the villain's spirit vanishes and the Dark Dozen revert to innocent human hosts, confirming Denny's suspicion.

After seeing how Tatsuo/Ninjak defeated the Dark Dozen "terrorists", Acclaim Entertainment drops their lawsuit. Shelley breaks up with Town, who blames a confused Denny. As the Acclaim Comics series ends, Tatsuo continues acting as Ninjak, secretly aided by Denny. Akuma remains as a spirit, biding his time.

=== Valiant Entertainment ===
In the Valiant Entertainment reboot universe, Colin King is the son of two British Intelligence operatives who rarely spend time with him. As an adult, Colin King joins MI-6, training under Angelina Alcott. Against MI6 policy and despite their need to maintain a mentor-student relationship, the two soon began a secret affair. A year later, Colin breaks protocol, a decision that indirectly leads to Angelina's death at the hands of Xaman, an assassin and acolyte of the Undead Monk. Lying about his own part in her death, Colin stays with MI-6 in order to avenge Angelina's death. His new handler is Neville Alcott, Angelina's father.

Infiltrating the Undead Monk's organization, King becomes one of many students. After intense training, he becomes a master ninja himself, then kills Xaman. The Monk's greatest students escape King's vengeance, becoming the villains known as the Shadow Seven. Returning to MI-6, King joins the agency's secret ninja operative program. Originally founded during the early 20th century, the MI-6 ninja program has included many operatives and assassins over the years. Ninja-A served during World War I, Ninja-E operated during the Cold War and helped prevent nuclear war. King is designated Ninja-K, though some simply call him "Ninjak." Although he serves MI-6 and believes in protecting the world, Ninjak makes it clear on several occasions that he follows his own code of ethics and will not compromise them. While not on mercenary missions as Ninjak, King spends his personal time living as a wealthy financier.

After living as a captive and slave for centuries, the Visigoth warrior Aric of Darcia defies his alien captors, a society known as the Vine. He returns to Earth thanks to the power of stolen alien armor called X-O Manowar. After failing to stop him, Vine's agents secretly operating inside MI-6 send Ninja-K to finish the job. Ninjak is able to defeat Aric despite his incredible power, drugging him and then stripping him of the armor while he's unconscious. After learning of the Vine's presence on Earth, Ninjak joins forces with Aric and a rogue Vine agent named Alexander Dorian. Ninjak agrees to pursue the remaining Vine sleeper agents with help from Neville Alcott, who has not been compromised.

Ninjak later joins the Unity team of heroes formed to stop Aric from world domination, joining Toyo Harada, the Eternal Warrior named Gilad, and the hero Livewire. Realizing Harada represents an even greater danger, the team allies with Aric against him. Following these events, Ninjak focuses his efforts on defeating Dr. Silk, a mysterious terrorist whose high-tech terror cell Webnet plans to unleash a viral epidemic.

== Powers and abilities ==
Ninjak is a master ninja or shinobi, meaning he is a master of ninjutsu, a group of martial skills that includes jujutsu (hand-to-hand fighting), bōjutsu (staff fighting), and iaijutsu (sword-based quickdraw). He also has expertise in karate, jeet kune do, judo, aikido and multiple forms of kung-fu. Ninjak has a genius-level intellect, as well as expertise in computer science, psychological operations, and military tactical analysis. Ninjak is particularly adept at learning languages, cyphers, and code systems.

Ninjak has no superhuman abilities but maintains regular training and exercise to keep his abilities at peak condition. His physical prowess is comparable to an Olympic decathlete. Since the Valiant Entertainment reboot, Ninjak can enhance his body's healing abilities through concentration and will due to his training under the Undead Monk. This allows him to recover from serious injuries such as a damaged spine, though it requires not only great concentration and willpower but also time.

Ninjak is also an expert marksman. He is an expert with swords, sai, bō and shurikens, and trained to understand how to turn various hand-held objects into weapons. Ninjak's uniform is special, lightweight kevlar-weave body armor with a titanium reinforcement around his chest. Ninjak is known for using a variety of high-tech gadgets on his missions. These can include customized shuriken that feature a variety of weaponized effects, collapsible swords, spy cameras and audio recorders, smoke bombs, and gas bombs. Since the Valiant Entertainment reboot, Ninjak also employs nanotechnology, contact lenses that provide information and scanning abilities via a heads-up display (HUD), vocal disguiser/amplifier, a miniature defibrillator, a multi-tool belt, and various other items.

The Acclaim Comics version of Ninjak, Denny Meechum, was an ordinary teenager with above-average skills regarding computers and game design/strategy. By saying the phrase "I call on the power of Ninjak" (and later by simple mental concentration), Denny could transform himself into Ninjak, an Asian warrior who was older, more athletic, dressed in a red uniform and had access to a few ancient weapons. Denny later learned that when he became Ninjak, he was joining with the spirit of a dead warrior-monk named Tatsuo, adopted not only his appearance and abilities but also the combined skills of several other warrior monks. By saying "Ninjak forever" (and later, simply by concentrating), Denny reverted to his normal appearance and whatever clothing he was wearing before the transformation. At one point, Denny attempted to alter his Ninjak costume, but when he transformed into his superhero identity again he found that the new costume did not return and he instead was once again wearing Ninjak's original uniform.

== Collected editions ==
Title	Material collected	Published date	ISBN
Valiant Comics
Valiant Masters: Ninjak Vol. 1 – Black Water	Ninjak (vol. 1) #0-6, #00	March 2013	978-0979640971
Ninjak: The 7th Dragon (Valiant Classic Collection)	Ninjak (vol. 1) #1–8, Bloodshot (vol. 1) #6–7, Secret Weapons (vol. 1) #5	July 2023	978-1682154083
Ninjak: The Complete Classic Omnibus	Ninjak (vol. 1) #0-26, #00, Ninjak Yearbook 1994 #1, Bloodshot (vol. 1) #6-7, Secret Weapons (vol. 1) #5	February 2018	978-1682152317
Valiant Entertainment
Ninjak Vol. 1: Weaponeer	Ninjak (vol. 3) #1-5	October 2015	978-1939346667
Ninjak Vol. 2: The Shadow Wars	Ninjak (vol. 3) #6-9	December 2015	978-1939346940
Ninjak Vol. 3: Operation: Deadside	Ninjak (vol. 3) #10-13	June 2016	978-1682151259
Ninjak Vol. 4: The Siege of King's Castle	Ninjak (vol. 3) #14-17	September 2016	978-1682151617
Ninjak Vol. 5: The Fist & The Steel	Ninjak (vol. 3) #18-21	February 2017	978-1682151792
Ninjak Vol. 6: The Seven Blades of Master Darque	Ninjak (vol. 3) #22-27	August 2017	978-1682152119
Ninjak Deluxe Edition Book 1	Ninjak (vol. 3) #1-13	February 2017	978-1682151570
Ninjak Deluxe Edition Book 2	Ninjak (vol. 3) #14–27, 0 and Book of Death: The Fall of Ninjak #1	March 2018	978-1682152577
Ninjak vs. the Valiant Universe	Ninjak vs. the Valiant Universe #1-4	October 2018	978-1682152737
Ninja-K Vol. 1: The Ninja Files	Ninja-K #1-5	May 2018	978-1682152591
Ninja-K Vol. 2: The Coalition	Ninja-K #6-9	October 2018	978-1682152812
Ninja-K Vol. 3: Fallout	Ninja-K #10-14	March 2019	978-1682153093
Ninja-K Deluxe Edition	Ninja-K #1-14 and material from Ninjak (vol. 3) #0	August 2019	978-1682153222
Ninjak: Book 1	Ninjak (vol. 4) #1-4	March 2022	978-1682154106

== In other media ==
=== Web series ===
Bat in the Sun made a live action Ninjak web series titled Ninjak vs. the Valiant Universe with Michael Rowe portraying the character. The series also stars Alex Meglei and Kevin Porter as Archer & Armstrong, Ciera Foster as Livewire, Jason David Frank as Bloodshot, John Morrison as Eternal Warrior, Derek Theler as X-O Manowar, Chantelle Barry as Roku, Tatiana DeKhtyar as Colonel Capshaw, Damion Poitier as Shadowman and Nicola Posener as Agent Vivien.

In April, 2018, it was announced at the Chicago Comic & Entertainment Expo that Ninjak vs. the Valiant Universe that consists of six episodes and premiered on April 21, 2018, through www.comicbook.com with the next five episodes to be released over the next five days.
