= Sean Chen (artist) =

American comic book artist

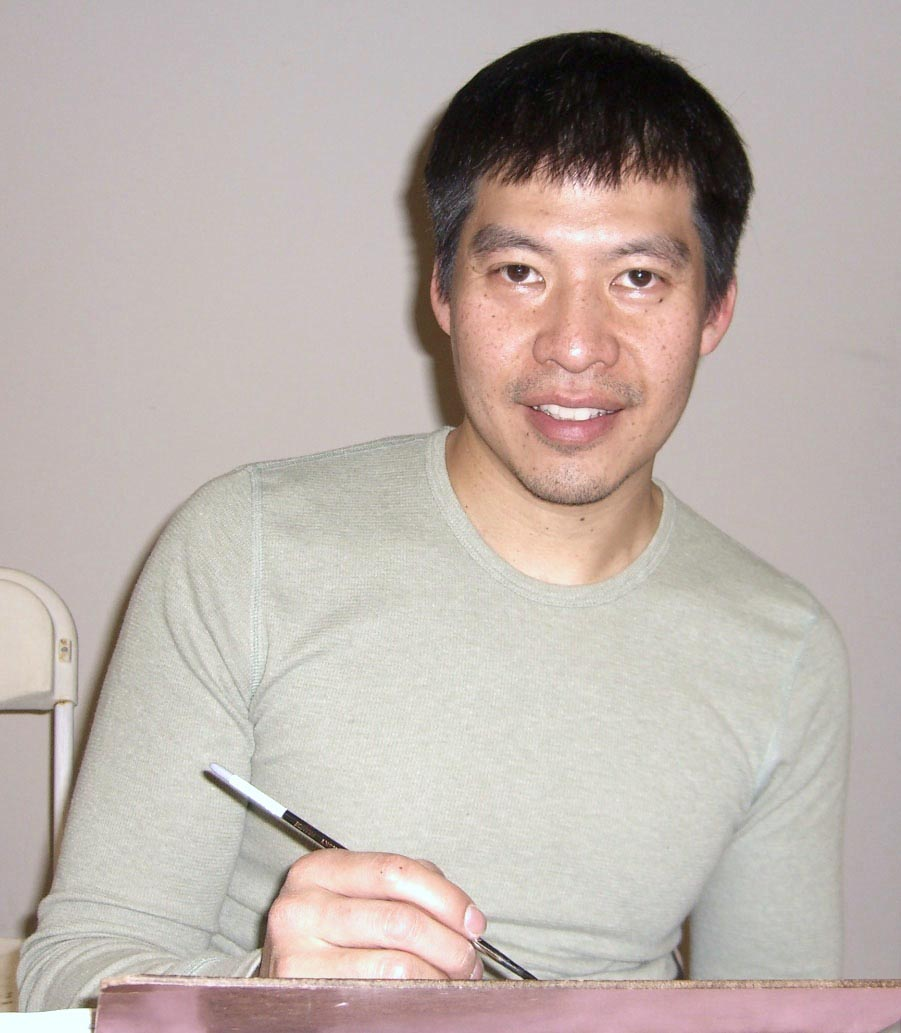
- Sean Chen at the Big Apple Con, November 14, 2008
- Born: August 15, 1968 (age 58) Washington, D.C., U.S.
- Area: Penciller
- Notable works: X-O Manowar; Iron Man; Elektra; Nova

Sean Chen (born August 15, 1968) is an American comic book artist.

== Career ==
Chen is a graduate of Carnegie Mellon University, where he received a bachelor's degree in industrial design. He started his career after being discovered by Barry Windsor-Smith. He began his career at Valiant Comics, penciling their flagship title, X-O Manowar, as well as Bloodshot, Harbinger, and Rai and the Future Force. His debut book, RFF #9, sold over 900,000 copies.

After Valiant, Chen moved on to Marvel Comics, where he drew Iron Man for over three years. His other works include Wolverine, Elektra, and the maxi-series X-Men: The End.

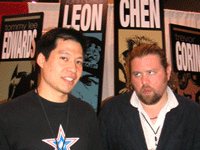
Sean Chen with fellow theBLVD member Tommy Lee Edwards at the September 2006 Canadian National Comic Book Convention

Chen also lends his talents to Marvel's Creative Services Division where he contributes to style guides and licensing art, including box cover illustrations for the Iron Man video game and various promotional items such as lunchboxes, T-shirts and posters.

Chen was the regular artist on the fourth volume of the Marvel Comics series Nova. Aside from comic books, he applies his creative talents by designing furniture and home renovations, specializing in kitchens and molded concrete countertops. He has also started a new line of designer toys and figurines.
