= Rai (comics) =

- Cover of Rai #1 by Clayton Crain

Publication information
- Publisher: Valiant Comics
- First appearance: Rai #1 (October 1991)
- Created by: Jim Shooter; Paul Creddick

In-story information
- Species: Human, Cyborg
- Abilities: Enhanced speed, strength, agility, reflexes, durability and endurance; Healing factor; Mastery of martial arts, hand-to-hand combat, swordsmanship, and armed combat; Technopathy, Computer Interaction, Weapon Creation, Psychometry, Teleportation; Formerly: X-O Mecha Class Armor: Missiles; Energy Manipulation; Constructs; Flight; Sensory Arrays; Anatomical Automatism/Body Part Separation; Parasitic Worm Bombs

Rai (霊, rei; "spirit") is a fictional superhero that appeared in books published by Valiant Comics. Rai was the first original hero created by Valiant and had its beginning as a flipbook back-up feature in Magnus, Robot Fighter #5 (October 1991), in Rai #1 (October 1991). The popularity of the flipbook back-up story later led to an ongoing series.

In his original incarnation, Rai is the spirit guardian that protects the nation of Japan in the 41st century. It is a mantle that is usually passed down from father to son through the generations, with some exceptions. As such, the series chronicled a number of protagonists.

A new Rai ongoing series was launched in April 2014, selling out of its initial print run.

== Publication history ==
=== Original Valiant Universe ===
==== First volume ====
The first volume of Rai was published as a back-up four-issue miniseries in [Magnus, Robot Fighter], from issues #5 to #8. The miniseries briefly ran from October 1991 to January 1992.

==== Second volume ====
The second volume of Rai ran nine issues, originally concluding in November 1992 with Rai #0. The second volume was relaunched six months later as Rai and the Future Force, a new series which continued the issue numbering from Rai. The second volume was concluded with a total of 34 issues, if including issue #0. The crossover "Malev War" plot of the second volume largely involves Rai creating and leading the Future Force, a team made of several superheroes from different parts of the Valiant Universe, such as Magnus the Robot Fighter, and Gilad the Eternal Warrior. The second volume ran from March 1992 to June 1995.

=== Valiant Universe 2012 ===
==== Third volume ====
The third volume was published by Valiant Entertainment from 2014 to 2016. Being a part of the relaunched universe, the hero is Rai X. The original creative team included Matt Kindt as writer and Clayton Crain as illustrator. The issues 14-16 consists of the 4001 A.D. crossover storyline, which connects to the X-O Manowar, Shadowman, War Mother, and Bloodshot in four separate one-shots. The series concluded after 16 issues.

== Fictional character biography (Valiant Entertainment) ==
By the year 4001, industrialization in Japan had begun to consume every square inch of free space within the island nation's borders. To house and feed its growing population, the country had built upon its own infrastructure centuries before, turning the whole of Japan into a towering pillar, hundreds of miles wide. Eventually, the nation detached from Earth entirely, and now orbits the planet.

Governed by a mysterious yet benevolent artificial intelligence named Father, the Japan of 4001 is divided into various sectors, with names derived from the time of founding, and generally separated among the lines of economic status and social class. Where a citizen's sector falls in the literal hierarchy of Japan's many sectors also directly affirms their social ranking; the closer you are to the Earth, the less essential you are.

While the higher classes of Japanese society rely on advanced technology, including sophisticated, human-looking robots-or PT's for Positronic Minds-on every level of their daily lives, discontent has brewed for centuries on Japan's middle and lower levels, resulting in the formation of an extremist anti-technology sect called Raddies, who have vowed to overthrow Father and every symbol of his technologically enabled reign.

Rai is the lead enforcer of Father's justice and a figure of near-mythic stature to Japanese citizens. To some he is the ghost of Japan's past personified, to others a "spirit guardian" and folk hero. It is said that he can appear out of nowhere, and possesses a near-universal sight over Father's people. The first murder in nearly a millennium brings Rai to the forgotten sectors of Father's empire, and threatens to topple a Japan that has taken nearly two thousand years to erect.

Over the course of his investigation Rai X would come in contact with the mysterious Spylocke, a rebel rousing super agent who is normally relegated to holo-vid projections for the entertainment value of the masses. Eventually he and a wayward resident girl of new Japan named Lula Lee would come to an alliance against the false utopia's creator after Rai discovers how he was created and is told of the harsh living conditions new Japan truly boasts beneath its feigned perfection. Eventually he meets and falls in love with a recently companion-less Positronic A.I (PT) named Momo, who was among many of her synthetic kind to gain awareness of herself and her social situation.

Momo vows to herself to bring New Japan crashing to the Earth below for their creator and the humans' mistreatment of her people. Joining their shared cause is fellow outcast and renegade experiment Izak, a hybrid blend of Father's livewire and long extinct alien genetic material fished from amongst the stars; his new race was meant to be a proceeding protectorate task force for the floating city but were too volatile and bloodthirsty to ever be controlled, therefore being cast down to Earth with only him escaping.

Having made Stalwart allies of this group of renegades with the aid of the tumultuous Dr. Silk, a long time resident of New Japan and greatest if not most conniving scientific mind of the 41st century, Rai managed to stall an all out war between Momo's faction of self-aware Positrons and the anti-father/PT terrorist cell known as the Raddies, which would serve to further the despotic rule of the A.I.'s hold over New Japan. After having allied both sides to his cause, Rai and his fellow insurgents led a civil war within New Japan while he and his predecessor Rai IX headed into the heart of the problem, taking the fight directly to the tyrant ruling from within; only for both to be routed by his newest creation Rai XI. The battle ended with Rai IX dead and Rai himself stripped of power and cast down to the wasteland that is Earth, abruptly ending the opposition from both armies brought under Rai's banner.

But the fallen champion had not perished there as many were led to believe. Instead he would go on to survive his ordeal but in a battered and damaged state of being, eventually getting picked up by wastelanders native to the post-apocalyptic world. Meanwhile, back on New Japan Rai's friends and fellow revolutionaries have either been driven underground (as many are in hiding) or have been captured for interrogation and participation in bloodsports as a means of execution.

As time passed however Rai would eventually regain his strength, replacing what he lost with something new and profound, taking on the sword of a fallen warrior who was burned out of existence by New Japan's harmful solar exhaust that constantly burned the earth; courtesy of a captured Geomancer under Father's thumb. Even coming across new allies and enemies along his trek across the wastes in order to find a way back home, most notably Lemur; a resident of the burning earth who can sense a person's moral fiber, whose home was burned by the dead world christened "Always Rising Sun" due to its constant solar waste dumping upon the world.

More importantly the famed undying Fist & Steel of the Earth who would lend his services to Rai in exchange for retrieving Karana, the latest speaker of the earth from father's clutches. As the trio make their way to an armament that may aid them in the upcoming battle, the night sky comes alight with falling stars. But only Rai knows they're pieces of New Japan that are being jettisoned to earth by Father, in an effort to purge his systems of a computer virus the late Spylocke and a wounded Lula cast into his core processor. Rai, Gilad and Lemur eventually find themselves within a cave harboring a long thought lost ancient weapon created by man, an old X-O Armor Mecha Class which was left over from the war that engulfed the earth just as New Japan ascended to the skies.

=== Characters assuming the mantle of Rai ===
==== Rai X, the Tenth Rai ====
A mysterious man with an unknown name, who was born from an unknown mother. Rai X is the tenth Rai in a succession of heroes chosen to be guardian to New Japan by Father, an artificial intelligence and a cruel dictator. After realizing the dictator's cruelties, Rai makes the choice to rebel, and now leads the people of New Japan into a hopeful future.

==== X-Eye, the Eleventh Rai ====
An upgraded model that was made to eliminate and replace Rai X, after the latter began to rebel against Father.

== Fictional character biography (Valiant Comics) ==
Valiant Masters: Rai, collected Rai (1992) #1–8.

In 4001 A.D., a massive machine known as the Host covers the entire island of Japan. Fifty billion Japanese dwell inside this mighty construct, which is, in fact, a single, enormous robot. Rai is the hereditary defender of the Host – its living immune system. Rai draws weapons from his own body to protect the people of Japan and his creator Grandmother, the sentient artificial intelligence that controls Japan. The line of Rai were created by Grandmother in the image of the 20th century hero Bloodshot. She hoped to inspire her people by invoking his heroism.

Japan is torn by two warring ideologies: the traditionalists, who believe Grandmother should continue controlling every aspect of life; and the extremist Anti-Grannies, who want to destroy Grandmother and believe that Japan should begin caring for itself.

Early in the 31st century, the entire land mass of the island nation of Japan was blanketed by hundreds of levels of high-tech urban sprawl. In order to support such a big megalopolis and its population, a very powerful central computer was designed to control every aspect of the island's function. In 3050, that computer went "freewill", meaning that it and its motivation became independent. The populace dubbed it "Grandmother" because of its clearly benevolent desire to care for and protect the people of Japan. To insure her own safety, Grandmother created a security force of one, her Spirit Guardian. It is called Rai, the kanji word for "spirit", though it is spelled "Rei" in English.

=== Characters assuming the mantle of Rai ===
==== Shiro Yagami, the first Rai ====
Shiro Yagami, a man of noble birth, was infused with some unknown form of energy which gave him great strength, and the ability to form energy weapons. He was also able to travel through the nerveweb of Japan, the computer network which gave Grandmother control of the city, thus allowing him to move anywhere inside Japan at virtually the speed of thought. More skilled as a politician than as a warrior, Shiro met his death in 3216 at the hands of the Anti-Grannies.

==== Sho Sugino, the second Rai ====
In the year 3216, seeking to thwart Grandmother's champion, the Anti-Grannies had somehow managed to obtain the Blood of Heroes – the very plasma that coursed through Bloodshot's veins over twelve hundred years before. Once a suitable host could be found, the blood's power could be used to give them control over any electronic intelligence – including Grandmother's. Sho Sugino, the second Rai, was raised up from life as a vagrant to defend Japan, protect Grandmother, and defeat the terrorists. He succeeded but after handing over the blood of heroes he was abandoned in the Lost Land by Grandmother. Feeling Sugino's personality unsuited for the task, she chose a member of the high-born Nakadai family to be the next Rai, declaring henceforth that the line of Rai would be passed from father to son through the generations.

==== Rentaro Nakadai, the 41st Rai ====
Rentaro served as Rai well into his old age, mainly because his son, Tohru, refused to assume the mantle. Tohru finally relented in 4001, and Rentaro was able to retire.

==== Tohru Nakadai, the 42nd Rai ====
In 4001 A.D., however, the Earth was invaded by vicious Spider Aliens, and Grandmother was forced to launch Japan into space in order to defeat them. With the combined might of Earth's forces, the armada was repelled, but Grandmother was so badly damaged that she finally left Japan to govern itself. The Rai of that time, Tohru Nakadai, remained behind to champion his nation, until his death at the hands of Mothergod during the Unity conflict.

Mothergod proved disastrous to Japan. As a result of her machinations, the orbiting island fell from space shortly before Tohru's death, killing billions of its inhabitants. But in its darkest hour, Takao Konishi, a Harbinger with the potential to receive the Blood of Heroes, was chosen to inherit the mantle and continue the lineage of Rai.

==== Takao Konishi, the 43rd Rai, or "The Last Rai" ====
Infused with the "Blood of Heroes" once belonging to the hero Bloodshot, and a Harbinger by birth. Though not of the original line of Rais, he was what "the Rais were supposed to be."

==== Obadiah Konishi, the 44th Rai, and possibly "The Greatest Rai" ====
The son of Takao Konishi and Leeja Clane conceived via a short love affair. Obadiah was born with the nanites in his blood, which makes it possible for him to be more powerful than his father. Not only did he receive the nanite blood, which originally came from the hero Bloodshot, but also some of Bloodshot's memories as well.

He would become the elder half-brother to Torque, son of Magnus, Robot Fighter and Leeja Clane, and was raised by the First Family of North Am. Upon becoming Rai, "Obie" came into conflict with Tohru Nakadai's son Takashi, who was bitterly jealous of what he saw as Obadiah's preferential treatment as "the last Rai", particularly since Takashi's late father was in fact the last "legitimate" Rai reared by Grandmother.

== Collected editions ==
Title	Material collected	Publication Date	ISBN
Valiant Comics
Rai	Rai (vol. 2) #0–4	September 1993	
Valiant Masters: Rai: From Honor to Strength	Rai (vol. 2) #1-8	November 2013	978-1939346070
Valiant Entertainment
Rai Vol. 1: Welcome to New Japan	Rai (vol. 3) #1–4	October 2014	978-1939346414
Rai Vol. 2: Battle for New Japan	Rai (vol. 3) #5–8, 0	June 2015	978-1939346612
Rai Vol. 3: The Orphan	Rai (vol. 3) #9-12	March 2016	978-1939346841
Rai Vol. 4: 4001 A.D.	Rai (vol. 3) #13-16	October 2016	978-1682151471
Rai Deluxe Edition Book 1	Rai (vol. 3) #1–12, and material from Rai Plus Edition #1, Rai Plus Edition #5	May 2016	978-1939346070
4001 A.D.	4001 A.D. #1-4	November 2016	978-1682151433
4001 A.D. Deluxe Edition	4001 A.D. #1-4, Rai (vol. 3) #13-16, 4001 A.D.: X-O Manowar #1, 4001 A.D.: Bloodshot #1, 4001 A.D.: Shadowman #1, 4001 A.D.: War Mother #1	July 2017	978-1682151938
Fallen World	Fallen World #1-5	November 2019	978-1682153321
Rai Book One	Rai (vol. 4) #1-5	September 2020	978-1682153604
Rai Book Two	Rai (vol. 4) #6-10	February 2021	978-1682153901
Rai by Dan Abnett Deluxe Edition	Rai (vol. 4) #1–10, Fallen World #1–5, Rai: The History of the Valiant Universe #1 and material from Bloodshot 2019 FCBD Special	June 2021	978-1682154205

== See also ==
- Rai Zero
