= Geomancer (disambiguation) =

A geomancer is a practitioner of geomancy, a method of divination.

Geomancer may also refer to:

- Geomancer (comics), a DC Comics character
- Geomancer (Dungeons & Dragons), a character class in Dungeons & Dragons
- Geomancer (novel), a 2002 book by Ian Irvine
- Geomancers (comics), a group of fictional comic book characters
