= Jen Van Meter =

American comic book writer

- Born: Jennifer Van Meter Fresno, California, U.S.
- Area: Writer
- Notable works: Hopeless Savages
- Spouse: Greg Rucka

Jennifer Van Meter is an American comic book writer best known for her Oni Press series Hopeless Savages.

== Early life and education ==
Van Meter was born and raised in Fresno, California. She graduated from Vassar College with a Bachelor of Arts in English, and followed that with a Master of Arts in Folklore Studies and Literature from the University of Oregon.

== Career ==
Van Meter's first published comics work was a story in the 1998 Dark Horse Presents annual that featured the first appearance of Buffy the Vampire Slayer in comic book form. Her first major writing gig in comics was the Oni Press one-shot set in the world of The Blair Witch Project. She went on to create Hopeless Savages, which told the story of the Hopeless-Savage family. The first four-issue series was nominated for an Eisner Award for best limited series in 2002, a Friends of Lulu Award in 2003, and was chosen as a 2004 Popular Paperback for Young Adults by the American Library Association. The original mini-series was followed by two more four-issue miniseries, Hopeless Savages: Ground Zero and Too Much Hopeless Savages. Van Meter's work at Oni Press led to a number of assignments for Big Two, including the mini-series Cinnamon: El Ciclo and Black Lightning: Year One as well as the ten-part back-up feature in JSA All-Stars that starred Liberty Belle and Hourman for DC Comics, and a mini-series starring Black Cat for Marvel. In 2014 and 2015, Van Meter wrote two mini-series starring Dr. Mirage for Valiant.

== Personal life ==
Van Meter lives in Portland, Oregon, with her husband, comics creator Greg Rucka, and their two children.

== Bibliography ==
=== Dark Horse Comics ===
- Dark Horse Presents Annual '98: "Buffy the Vampire Slayer: MacGuffins" (with Luke Ross, anthology, 1998)
  - Collected by Dark Horse in Buffy the Vampire Slayer Omnibus Volume 2 (tpb, 296 pages, 2007, ISBN 1-5930-7826-9)
  - Collected by Boom! Studios in Buffy the Vampire Slayer: Legacy Edition Book One (tpb, 320 pages, 2020, ISBN 1-6841-5499-5)
- Eerie vol. 2 #8: "Human Resources" (with Tony Parker, anthology, 2015) collected in Eerie: Experiments in Terror (tpb, 168 pages, 2016, ISBN 1-6165-5880-6)

=== Oni Press ===
- The Blair Witch Chronicles (tpb, 120 pages, 2000, ISBN 1-9299-9804-X) collects:
  - The Blair Witch Project (with Tommy Lee Edwards, Guy Davis and Bernie Mireault, one-shot, 1999)
  - The Blair Witch Chronicles #1–4 (with Guy Davis (#1), Bernie Mireault (#2, 4) and Tom Fowler (#3), 2000)
- Hopeless Savages:
  - Hopeless Savages: Greatest Hits 2000–2010 (tpb, 392 pages, 2010, ISBN 1-9349-6448-4) collects:
    - Oni Press Color Special (anthology):
      - Oni Press Color Special '00: "Sticks and Stones" (with Chynna Clugston-Major, 2000)
      - Oni Press Color Special '01: "Hopeless-Savage Romance" (with Christine Norrie, 2001)
    - Hopeless Savages #1–4 (with Christine Norrie and Chynna Clugston-Major, 2001)
    - Hopeless Savages: Ground Zero #1–4 (with Bryan Lee O'Malley, Andi Watson, Christine Norrie and Chynna Clugston-Major, 2002)
    - Too Much Hopeless Savages! #1–4 (with Christine Norrie and Ross Campbell, 2003)
    - Hopeless Savages B-Sides: The Origin of the Dusted Bunnies (with Becky Cloonan, Vera Brosgol, and Mike Norton, one-shot, 2005)
  - Hopeless Savages: Break (with Meredith McClaren and Christine Norrie, graphic novel, 152 pages, 2015, ISBN 1-6201-0252-8)
- Resurrection vol. 2 #11: "The Return of St. John" (with T. J. Kirsch, co-feature, 2010)

=== DC Comics ===
- Flinch #1: "Nice Neighborhood" (with Frank Quitely, anthology, Vertigo, 1999) collected in Flinch Book One (tpb, 192 pages, 2015, ISBN 1-4012-5812-3)
- Batman:
  - Batman: Gotham Knights #12: "Damages" (with Koi Turnbull, 2001) collected in Batman: Gotham Knights — Transference (tpb, 304 pages, 2020, ISBN 1-4012-9407-3)
  - Batman: The Golden Streets of Gotham (with Cliff Chiang and Tommy Lee Edwards, one-shot, Elseworlds, 2003)
- Weird Western Tales vol. 2 #4: "Bury Me Not on the Lone Prairie" (with Dave Taylor, anthology, Vertigo, 2001)
- Cinnamon: El Ciclo #1–5 (with Francisco Paronzini, 2003–2004)
- Justice Society of America:
  - JSA: Classified #5–7: "Honor Among Thieves" (with Pat Olliffe, 2006) collected in JSA: Classified — Honor Among Thieves (tpb, 128 pages, 2007, ISBN 1-4012-1218-2)
  - Justice Society of America 80-Page Giant: "Spin Cycle" (with Jesús Merino, anthology one-shot, 2010)
  - JSA: All-Stars vol. 2 #2–11: "The Inheritance" (with Travis Moore, co-feature, 2010)
- The Outsiders vol. 3 #32–33 (with Dietrich Smith, 2006) collected in The Outsiders: Crisis Intervention (tpb, 128 pages, 2006, ISBN 1-4012-0973-4)
- Black Lightning: Year One #1–6 (with Cully Hamner, 2009) collected as Black Lightning: Year One (tpb, 144 pages, 2009, ISBN 1-4012-2169-6)

=== Marvel Comics ===
- Captain America vol. 3 #50: "A Moment of Silence" (with Brian Hurtt, co-feature, 2002) collected in Captain America: Red, White and Blue (tpb, 200 pages, 2007, ISBN 0-7851-2897-2)
- Miss America Comics 70th Anniversary Special: "Shipyard Sabotage!!" (with Andy MacDonald, 2009) collected in Timely 70th Anniversary Collection (hc, 280 pages, 2010, ISBN 0-7851-3899-4)
- Spider-Man:
  - Black Cat vol. 2 #1–4: "The Trophy Hunters" (with Javier Pulido and Javier Rodríguez (#2–3), 2010) collected in Spider-Man: Black Cat (tpb, 128 pages, 2011, ISBN 0-7851-4318-1)
  - The Amazing Spider-Man:
    - "Date Night" (with Stephanie Buscema, co-feature in #700, 2013) collected in The Amazing Spider-Man: Dying Wish (hc, 136 pages, 2013, ISBN 0-7851-6523-1; tpb, 2013, ISBN 0-7851-6524-X)
    - "Cat and Mouse: A Black Cat Mystery" (with Emma Ríos, co-feature in #700.3, 2014) collected in The Amazing Spider-Man: Peter Parker, the One and Only (tpb, 168 pages, 2014, ISBN 0-7851-9010-4)
- Fear Itself: The Worthy #6: "My Name is Titania" (with Clayton Henry, digital minicomic, 2011)
  - First published in print as a feature in Fear Itself: The Worthy (one-shot, 2011)
  - Collected in Fear Itself: Spider-Man (hc, 136 pages, 2012, ISBN 0-7851-5804-9; tpb, 2012, ISBN 0-7851-5703-4)
- The Iron Age #2: "On 42nd Street..." (with Nick Dragotta, anthology, 2011) collected in The Iron Age (hc, 192 pages, 2011, ISBN 0-7851-5269-5)
- Thunderbolts #159: "The Ghost and Mr. Walker" (with Eric Canete, co-feature, 2011) collected in Fear Itself: Thunderbolts (hc, 136 pages, 2012, ISBN 0-7851-5798-0; tpb, 2012, ISBN 0-7851-5223-7)
- Avengers Solo #1–5: "Pathfinder" (with Roger Robinson, Al Barrionuevo (#3) and Declan Shalvey (#5), anthology, 2011–2012) collected in Avengers Solo (tpb, 144 pages, 2012, ISBN 0-7851-6071-X)
- Marvel Adventures: Super Heroes #21: "Super Troupers" (with Pepe Larraz, anthology, 2012)
- The Avengers: Earth's Mightiest Heroes #9: "The Skies are... Doomed!" (with Luciano Vecchio, anthology, 2013)
- Infinity Companion (hc, 688 pages, 2014, ISBN 0-7851-8886-X) includes:
  - Captain Marvel vol. 6 #15–16 (co-written by Van Meter and Kelly Sue DeConnick, art by Pat Olliffe, 2013)
  - Avengers Assemble #19 (co-written by Van Meter and Kelly Sue DeConnick, art by Barry Kitson, 2013)
- Savage Wolverine #18 (with Rich Ellis, 2014) collected in Savage Wolverine: The Best There is (hc, 136 pages, 2014, ISBN 0-7851-5487-6; tpb, 2015, ISBN 0-7851-8965-3)
- 100th Anniversary Special: Fantastic Four (with Joanna Estep, one-shot, 2014) collected in Marvel: The 100th Anniversary (tpb, 112 pages, 2014, ISBN 0-7851-5413-2)

=== Other publishers ===
- Adventures @ eBay (co-written by Van Meter and Greg Rucka, art by Judd Winick, one-shot, eBay Publishing, 2000)
- Mobile Suit Gundam Wing: Blind Target #1–4 (adapted by Van Meter; translated by Lillian Olsen; written by Akemi Omode, drawn by Sakura Asagi, Viz, 2000)
- Red Sonja: Break the Skin (with Edgar Salazar, one-shot, Dynamite, 2011) collected in Red Sonja: Travels Volume 2 (tpb, 280 pages, 2015, ISBN 1-6069-0584-8)
- Doctor Mirage (Valiant):
  - The Death-Defying Doctor Mirage: Deluxe Edition (hc, 272 pages, 2016, ISBN 1-6821-5153-0) collects:
    - The Death-Defying Doctor Mirage #1–5 (with Roberto de la Torre, 2014–2015) also collected as The Death-Defying Doctor Mirage (tpb, 128 pages, 2015, ISBN 1-9393-4649-5)
    - The Death-Defying Doctor Mirage: Second Lives #1–4 (with Roberto de la Torre, 2015–2016) also collected as Doctor Mirage: Second Lives (tpb, 112 pages, 2016, ISBN 1-6821-5129-8)
- Spitball: A CCAD Comics Anthology #1: "Victory Garden" (with Hannah Ross, Columbus College of Art and Design, 2015)
- Fresh Romance #7–8: "Don't Break Up the Party" (with Kyle Latino, digital anthology, Rosy Press, 2016)
- Prima (with Rick Burchett, unreleased series intended for publication by Image, announced for 2016)
