= Valiant Universe =

Fictional super hero universe

- Original work: Magnus, Robot Fighter #1 (May 1991)
- Owner: Valiant Comics

Print publications
- Comics: Rai; Bloodshot; Ninjak; X-O Manowar; Eternal Warrior; H.A.R.D. Corps

Films and television
- Film(s): Bloodshot (2020)

The Valiant Universe is the fictional shared universe where most stories in American comic book titles that are published by Valiant Comics take place.

The majority of the characters within said universe were created by Jim Shooter, and Bob Layton, the founders of the publisher. Valiant superheroes such as Bloodshot, Shadowman, Rai, X-O Manowar, Archer & Armstrong, Gilad the Eternal Warrior, Doctor Mirage, and Ninjak are from this universe, and it also contains well-known supervillains such as the Spider Aliens, Toyo Harada, Mothergod, and Roku.

== Concepts ==
The Original Valiant Universe by Anthony Castrillo

Jim Shooter's original vision for the Valiant Universe was likely similar to the New Universe vision he had during his tenure at Marvel Comics: a more realistic setting, involving fewer mythological concepts.

A further distinction from most fictional universes in comics, particularly both the Marvel Universe and DC Universe, the actions and appearances of one Valiant character in one specific title may have visible and possibly lasting effects on another character from another title. This is evident within the original launch of the universe, given the revelation that Rai's traditional "white skin with red dots" image was created by Grandmother to honor the heroism of Angelo Mortalli, the original Bloodshoot. It is also revealed that Takao Konishi (the 44th Rai) even has Mortalli's nanite powered "Blood of Heroes" in his veins, granting him some of Bloodshot's memories and all of his powers. The blood and memories were also passed down to Konishi's son, the 45th Rai. However, this connection between Rai and Bloodshot does not exist in the Acclaim Entertainment Universe, or in the 2012 Valiant Universe.

Another unusual distinction in the Valiant Universe is that there is little comic book death, and Valiant characters tend to remain deceased. The prime example of this would the superhero Rai, an entity that continues over many generations. Whenever the current Rai dies, another person is chosen to take on the mantle. Another prime example would be Doctor Solar's girlfriend, who has remained deceased even though the universal reboots and relaunches. In contrast to this, several heroes in the Valiant Universe such as Doctor Solar, and the Eternal Warrior are virtually immortal. Other notable characters, such as Doctor Solar, and the Geomancers possess long lifespans.

=== Superheroes/supervillains ===
Although it is a long-standing tradition for comic book writers and publishers to create costumed superheroes, Valiant could be regarded as an antithesis to that in a certain way. Reason being is that the majority of the characters existing in the Valiant Universe are simply metahumans, well-known human beings with extranormal powers and abilities. Despite that the Valiant Universe primarily eschews costumes and secret identities, several exceptions to this are Ninjak, Doctor Tomorrow, Doctor Solar, and even X-O Manowar to some extent.

=== Time ===
The notable distinction regarding time within the Valiant Universe, is that a considerable amount of the stories often take place spanning several generations and even centuries. As a result, there is little to no use of the "floating timeline" plot device, which can be considered as a tradition in fictional universes. The lack of a floating timeline was likely decided due to the original vision of establishing a fictional universe that could be viewed like the "real world" itself.

There are ironically several parallels to the floating timeline plot device. The Lost Lands is a hostile place where time barely moves forward, while millions of years pass outside of it. This is due to a cosmic anomaly, truly making the Lost Lands "a place where time has no meaning." Gilad The Eternal Warrior and his foe, the Immortal Enemy are both ageless, virtually immortal, and having lived many lifetimes.

However as with most fictional stories and universes, there is the extensive usage of time travel among certain characters. Time travel in this universe is done by several means, including moving faster than the speed of light. Time dilation also takes place during X-O Manowar's enslavement on the Spider Alien's ship. While only a few years passed relative to Aric, sixteen centuries passed on Earth.

=== Technology ===
Technology within the Valiant Universe is generally more advanced than that which is currently available in real life. However, it is likely used exclusively among certain chosen individuals and organizations. The Harbinger Foundation, a well-known non-profit organization ran by Harada, provides facilities that train psionic people to reach their full potential serving his purpose. In the Original Valiant continuity, Harada and the Harbinger Foundation is opposed by the Omen Corporation, an organization that utilizes experimental brain implants, which give copied Harbinger-like abilities to its H.A.R.D. Corps team members. Unfortunately, the use of these abilities combined with the high possibility of sudden death brings a great amount of stress to the user's minds, slowly killing them. As a fail-safe procedure, the brain implants can be triggered to ignite and explode. This is done to ensure obedience from the team members, and to possibly maintain secrecy, should any of the members die or be captured in any manner. It is revealed that the brain implant technology was ironically stolen from the Harbinger Foundation by the Omen Corporation.

Technology is also very prominent by way of ‘’Nanites/Nanite Blood/Blood of Heroes,’’ which is a form of nanomachines originally used by a secret military organization known as Project Rising Spirit. The nanomachines provide a person enhanced strength, agility, speed, durability, accelerated healing, and the ability to detect combat situations. As a side effect, the individual's skin becomes paler, to the point of chalk-white, and their eyes turn red. IN the Original Valiant continuity, this particular nanotechnology was first utilized on Angelo Mortalli, before being stolen and passed over to the Rai lineage, which would then be used in traditions throughout the coming centuries.

Robots, computers, and even armor can have self-awareness and superior intelligence when they are created as sentient beings. From a general standpoint X-O Manowar Armor is sentient in its own way, and is regarded as living armor that can bond with the user's body, even after death. In the year of 4000 A.D. the entire nation of Japan is in rotating orbit while being covered by a massive robot known as the Host. The superhero Rai is an entity that is created by Grandmother—a sentient artificial intelligence—whose mission is to protect both Japan and itself. Part of the process for a human being to receive the mantle of Rai requires the candidate to shed a portion of their own blood in order to make room for the unstable nanite blood.

== History ==
=== Valiant Universe (1992–1994) ===
The genesis of the Valiant Universe came about in 1991, after Valiant Comics acquired and relaunched two characters from Gold Key Comics. The two characters are Magnus Robot Fighter, and Doctor Solar. Even today, this is seen as a rare move in the business as publishers typically launch comic books with their own original characters created by work-for-hire writers and artists under their employ. A third Gold Key acquisition, Turok, also became a noteworthy part of the Valiant Universe. Magnus, Solar, and Turok are no longer characters published under the Valiant banner as in 2013 Dynamite Entertainment acquired the publishing rights. These characters, however, left a lasting impact on the overall legacy of Valiant.

In the early years, the Valiant Universe was largely expanded by way of Magnus and Solar since a number of characters emerged as spin-offs from these titles, such as Rai, the Spider Aliens, The Eternal Warrior, and Erica Pierce. Storyline-wise, Solar was used to restart the Valiant Universe (In a somewhat similar way to how Dr. Manhattan would be utilized by DC Comics to restart the DC Universe many years later, after being acquired from Alan Moore.)

There were also several changes of publishing ownership that would cause several relaunches of the entire Valiant line after 1996. Therefore, each relaunch could be seen as its own separate universe in a sense. This particular article is an attempt to highlight notable distinctions, events, and transitions taking place within each relaunch. In general, the Valiant Universe is considered by some to be a "multiverse", composed of three alternate timelines.

==== Unity ====
Published by Valiant Comics in August 1992, Unity is the first-ever company-wide crossover story. Unity was conceived of by Jim Shooter due to his desire to revolutionize the crossover concept in comics, much like the Secret Wars crossover storyline he created during his tenure at Marvel Comics. The entire "Unity" storyline consists of eighteen issues across nine comic book titles, running from August to September 1992. Additionally, Unity served as a launchpad for several spin-off titles, further expanding the Valiant Universe.

=== Acclaim Comics era (1994–2004) ===
==== Unity 2000 ====
Unity 2000 is the name of an Acclaim mini-series, which was written in the year of 1999 by Jim Shooter, penciled by Jim Starlin, and originally slated to run for six issues. This miniseries was Shooter's first story with Valiant characters since being fired from the company in the year of 1992. Seeing the changes and transitions made to the universe since he was fired from the publication, the purpose of the crossover was to briefly establish a "multiverse," by combining the storylines and characters from the Original Valiant Universe (VH1, 1991–1996) to those from the Acclaim Valiant Universe (VH2, 1997–2000). Future Acclaim Valiant stories would have continued from where Unity 2000 ended, explaining the relationship between VH1 and VH2 stories.

Shooter introduced another alternate universe, called VH-0 by fans. It was his vision of what the Valiant Universe would have been like, if he had been allowed to stay with the company. According to Shooter's plot, at the end of the crossover, VH-0 was destroyed and most of its characters were killed. VH-1 and VH-2 would then fuse together into a new universe. However, Acclaim continued to suffer losses on their video games while the series suffered a number of administrative problems (art return and issues with Jim not being paid) and were forced to cancel the series after only the third issue. The company folded shortly afterwards, and all comic assets were acquired and relaunch by then newly-formed Valiant Entertainment.

=== Valiant Universe (2005–present) ===
List of events and crossovers:

- The Valiant
- Harbinger Wars
- Harbinger Wars II
- Armor Hunters
- Book of Death
- Incursion
- Resurgence of the Valiant Universe

==== Valiant Beyond ====
Valiant Beyond is a new reboot of the Valiant Universe following Resurgence of the Valiant Universe. It was originally reported on by Bleeding Cool to be Valiant's response to the increase of separate comic universes using previous characters with more creative freedom, such as Marvel's Ultimate Universe.

Title	Issue	Writer	Artist	Premiere schedule	Finale schedule
Valiant Beyond: Bloodshot
Bloodshot	#1–3	Mauro Mantella	Fernando Heinz Furukawa	August 13, 2025	December 10, 2025
Valiant Beyond: Bloodshot Special		Dan Abnett	Guillermo Fajardo	May 6, 2026 (Free Comic Book Day)	
Bloodshot: Man Made Hell	#1–3	Mauro Mantella	Rodrigo Rocha	June 24, 2026	November 11, 2026
Bloodshot: Toy Soldiers	#1–2	Mauro Mantella	Iván Luna Pineda	November 11, 2026	November 25, 2026
Valiant Beyond: Tales of the Shadowman
Tales of the Shadowman	#1–3	AJ Ampadu	Sergio Monjes	August 20, 2025	November 5, 2025
Tales of the Shadowman: Ghosts of the Bayou	#1–3	AJ Ampadu	Sergio Monjes	December 3, 2025	March 4, 2026
Tales of the Shadowman: Legacy of LeRoi	#1–3	AJ Ampadu	Sergio Monjes	April 1, 2026	TBA 2026
Tales of the Shadowman Finale: Darque Legacy	#1	AJ Ampadu	Sergio Monjes	October 28, 2026	
Valiant Beyond: All-New Harbinger
All-New Harbinger	#1–3	Fred Van Lente	Andres Ponce	September 10, 2025	November 19, 2025
All-New Harbinger: It Never Stops	#1–3	Fred Van Lente	Erik Tamayo	February 4, 2026	March 25, 2026
All-New Harbinger: Risen	#1–4	Fred Van Lente	Erik Tamayo	May 6, 2026	TBA 2026
All-New Harbinger Finale: The Wedding	#1	Fred Van Lente	Erik Tamayo	December 2, 2026	
Valiant Beyond: The X-O Manowar
The X-O Manowar	#1–4	Steve Orlando	Guillermo Fajardo	September 17, 2025	December 24, 2025
The X-O Manowar: The God Hunt	#1–4	Steve Orlando	Diego Giribaldi	January 14, 2026	April 15, 2026
The X-O Manowar Finale: The Pilgrimage	#1	Steve Orlando	Dani Parker	October 21, 2026	
Other
Valiant Beyond Ashcan	#1	Various		July 24, 2025	

== Valiant Cinematic Universe ==
=== Gilad the Eternal Warrior ===
In August 2017, Dave Bautista was announced to be in talks to play the Gilad the Eternal Warrior in a solo movie. The 2020 Bloodshot movie was meant to be the first of several films taking place in a shared Valiant Cinematic Universe that would include characters such as Gilad. After largely poor reception to the film, and with many studio projects on hold or rescheduled due to the COVID-19 pandemic, the status of an Eternal Warrior movie is unclear.

=== Ninjak ===
In 2018, Bat in the Sun made a live action Ninjak web series titled Ninjak vs. the Valiant Universe with Michael Rowe portraying the character. The series also stars Alex Meglei and Kevin Porter as Archer & Armstrong, Ciera Foster as Livewire, Jason David Frank as Bloodshot, John Morrison as Eternal Warrior, Derek Theler as X-O Manowar, Chantelle Barry as Roku, Tatiana DeKhtyar as Colonel Capshaw, Damion Poitier as Shadowman and Nicola Posener as Agent Vivien. In April 2018, the web series was released as a single film on Valiant Comics' YouTube page on March 26, 2020 as promotion for Bloodshot, which is considered the first official film in the Valiant Cinematic Universe.

=== Bloodshot ===
In 2020, Valiant Comics has extended to cinematic format, with Bloodshot being the first-ever Valiant-based film. The plan is for the film to be the launch of a new shared cinematic universe of Valiant Comics superheroes, Bloodshot was conceived to be followed by a sequel, two films based on the comic book series Harbinger, and then a crossover film titled Harbinger Wars. Though a Harbinger movie was initially scheduled to be the first installment in the franchise, development was delayed in favor of Bloodshot.

In March 2020, director David S. F. Wilson stated that even though different film studios have distribution rights, Valiant still plans to build a franchise from Bloodshot, acknowledging that Vin Diesel will play a large role in the future of the planned film series. In November 2020, a Bloodshot sequel was officially announced as being in development, with Diesel intended to reprise his role. By December of the same year, Diesel confirmed his involvement with the project.
