= Peter Stanchek =

Sting

Publication information
- Publisher: Valiant Comics
- First appearance: Harbinger #1 (January 1992)
- Created by: Jim Shooter; David Lapham

In-story information
- Alter ego: Peter Stanchek
- Team affiliations: Harbinger Resistance
- Abilities: Peter is an Omega Harbinger and can control the full spectrum of mind-based abilities, including telepathy, telekinesis, mind-control, and can activate latent Harbinger powers in others

Sting (Peter Stanchek) is a superhero created by legendary writer and former Marvel Comics editor-in-chief Jim Shooter. First appearing in Harbinger #1 (Jan. 1992), he is the star of the Harbinger comic book series, where he leads a group of renegade Harbingers against Toyo Harada and the Harbinger Foundation.

== Story ==
Toyo Harada is the first publicly known Harbinger, and unlike subsequent Harbingers he was able to make his powers manifest at will, or activate the powers of others.

Harada is an Omega Harbinger: he commands the full spectrum of psionic abilities, which he uses to create a multinational corporation and amass a large fortune. Fearing the world is on a course to destroy itself, he plans to take it over and mold it to his specifications. To this end he creates the Harbinger Foundation, which actively searches for potential Harbingers.

Pete Stanchek is a normal teenager until he develops Harbinger abilities. After seeing an advertisement he contacts the Harbinger Foundation. Harada is intrigued by Pete, who is the only other Harbinger to have triggered his own powers and who exhibits multiple abilities. Harada is no longer the only Omega Harbinger.

Harada tries to persuade Pete to join the Harbinger Foundation and become Harada's right-hand man, but when Pete's best friend, who had been vocal about his distrust for Harada, is murdered by the Foundation, Pete realizes the truth.

Pete, along with Kris (a high school cheerleader who, he later realizes, he had been unconsciously mentally controlling so that she would go out with him) become renegades. They decide to recruit Harbingers themselves, activate their abilities and form an army capable of challenging Harada.

Later in the series, it is revealed that Harada has in fact been mentally manipulating the Harbinger rebels, and Pete and Harada face off in a battle royale. Harada is left comatose and Pete supposedly powerless. Pete's fellow renegades go their separate ways, with Pete wandering off into the night with his teammate Flamingo, only to resurface later on as "The Harbinger," an armored, brainwashed servant of Harada, hunting down new rogue Harbingers. He is opposed by the mysterious masked hero "The Visitor," who in turn is revealed to be an alternate future version of Pete himself. At the close of the Visitor's self-titled series, the present-day Pete breaks free from his programming and is forced to join forces with Harada and the Visitor to save the world from an alien invasion. After their triumph and the death of the Visitor, Pete warns Harada to leave him and Flamingo alone.

== Homosexuality ==
According to Jim Shooter, the character of Pete Stanchek was meant to have been gay. Titles featuring the character were cancelled before this was revealed, although it was heavily implied in the pages of Shooter's unpublished Unity 2000 miniseries, in which a villainness offers to change her form to that of a man to appeal to Pete.
