= Mothergod =

- Erica Pierce (Mothergod). From UNITY #0, art by Barry Windsor-Smith

Publication information
- Publisher: Valiant Comics
- First appearance: Solar, Man of the Atom #1 (1991)
- Created by: Jim Shooter; Barry Windsor-Smith; Bob Layton

In-story information
- Alter ego: Erica Pierce
- Abilities: Energy manipulation Matter manipulation Reality warping

Mothergod (Erica Pierce) is a fictional character from Valiant Comics. She was exposed to the same energies that turned Phil Seleski into Solar, and she gained the same energy and matter manipulation powers. Driven mad by the destruction and imperfect recreation of the universe, Mothergod sought to repair reality by erasing everything and starting again with the time streams aligned, leading to the events of the world-shaking UNITY Crossover.

== Publication history ==
Despite being a central character within the original Valiant Universe, Mothergod was not given her own title series.

== Fictional character biography ==
=== Original Valiant continuity ===
Erica works as a physicist along with Phil Seleski at Edgewater Nuclear Plant during the original near-explosion incident. The same accident that gives Phil Seleski his powers also grants Erica powers of her own - reality warping. Later, when Seleski accidentally destroys Earth and sends himself back in time, Erica is sucked back with him. The overall result of that moment is what became the Original Valiant Universe.

Erica's domestic life was bad and getting worse, ending with the decision to kill her abusive husband one evening. While in shock from the killing, the Erica Pierce who had traveled back in time came in and kills the Erica Pierce of this timeline and took over as her.

She takes her son and goes into hiding until August 5, 4001, when she set Unity in motion. Seleski's trip back in time had tangled up the timeline and Erica saw no way to untangle the mess. Instead she wants to start fresh by creating a new timeline. Her plans are stopped and she was put in a wormhole of non-existence to keep her from doing any more harm.

=== Acclaim Comics continuity ===
Erica is last seen in the wormhole during the second Unity.
