= Unity (comics) =

Crossover story published by Valiant Comics

- Publisher: Valiant Comics
- Publication date: August – September 1992
- Genre: Science fiction, superhero; Crossover
Title(s)
Archer & Armstrong #1–2
Eternal Warrior #1–2
Harbinger #8–9
Magnus, Robot Fighter #15–16
Rai #6–7
Shadowman #4–5
Solar, Man of the Atom #12–13
Unity #0–1
X-O Manowar #7–8

"Unity" is an 18-issue crossover story published by Valiant Comics in the summer of 1992. It was conceived by Valiant's Editor-in-Chief, Jim Shooter, who wanted to revolutionize the crossover concept in comics.

The story was serialized in all nine of the Valiant Universe comic book titles published from August to September 1992 and set up several spin-off titles.

In 2012, several years after Valiant had ceased publishing comic books, they restarted their continuity and the name was repurposed for the superhero team Unity.
