= Eternal Warrior =

- Eternal Warrior. Art by Trevor Hairsine

Publication information
- Publisher: Valiant Comics
- First appearance: Solar: Man of the Atom #10 (June 1992)
- Created by: Jim Shooter; Don Perlin

In-story information
- Alter ego: Gilad Anni-Padda
- Team affiliations: Unity
- Notable aliases: Gilad Abrams, Gilad Anni-Padda, Eternal Warrior, Fist & Steel, Gilad the One, Gil Masters, Eternal Emperor
- Abilities: Immortality; Super-strength, limited invulnerability, regeneration; millennia of fighting skills

Gilad Anni-Padda, also known as the Eternal Warrior, is a superhero published by Valiant Comics and created by Jim Shooter and Don Perlin. Introduced in 1992, he was then rebooted in 1996 after Acclaim Entertainment bought Valiant Comics. He was rebooted again by Valiant Entertainment, Inc. in 2012. An ageless master fighter with enhanced abilities, Gilad helps protect Earth and humanity from various threats over his long life, often using methods considered ruthless by others.

The character is described as "the Fist and Steel of the Earth," a warrior chosen by the planet itself. He is guided by the Geomancers, a long line of sorcerers in the Valiant Universe who are guided by the voice and will of Earth itself. In each version of his continuity, Gilad has two immortal brothers: Aram (who later takes the name Armstrong) and Ivar the Timewalker. Since the 2012 Valiant Universe reboot, Gilad also has an immortal sister: Vexana the War-Monger. In each version of his continuity, Gilad fights a perpetually reincarnating villain called the Immortal Enemy or the Last Enemy. In both the original continuity and the 2012 Valiant Entertainment reboot continuity, it is indicated that any children Gilad has may be fated to be psychopathic or remorseless killers.

== Publication history ==
=== Original Valiant Comics ===
Gilad was introduced in Eternal Warrior, a 50-issue series published by Valiant Comics from 1992 to 1996. During this time, there were also two issues published of the supplementary mini-series Eternal Warrior Yearbook. The original creative team was co-creator Jim Shooter with artist John Dixon, followed by writers Kevin VanHook, Barry Windsor-Smith, Mark Moretti, and John Ostrander. The series followed Gilad's adventures, often having him encounter other Valiant heroes and villains in the Valiant Universe such as Bloodshot, Master Darque, and the team of Archer & Armstrong. Issues often involved flashback scenes to different adventures Gilad experienced through history, later also showing his life centuries in the future.

Throughout history, Gilad is often seen working alongside Geomancers, a long-line of sorcerers connected to Earth itself and who sometimes recruited others to help against great threats. His one recurring foe is the Immortal Enemy, a mortal who repeatedly reincarnates, recalls his past lives, and attempts evil again, always having one green eye and one brown eye. Originally, Eternal Warrior Volume 1 #1 introduces Gilad with only one immortal brother, Aram. The crossover story of Eternal Warrior Volume 1 #8 and Archer & Armstrong Volume 1 #8 then retroactively introduced Ivar as a third brother, the eldest, before he went on to star in his own series Timewalker, which then established that the father of the three men was a warrior called Vandal, who may have had unique qualities himself. Some fans have wondered if the immortal DC Comics villain Vandal Savage was an inspiration for Gilad, both due to the name being used for his father and because, like Gilad, Savage also has an enemy who repeatedly reincarnates in new bodies and retains knowledge of his past lives, the hero Immortal Man.

=== Acclaim Comics ===
Acclaim Entertainment bought Valiant comics in 1994, leading to the first reboot of the Valiant characters. In 1997, the graphic novel series Eternal Warriors reintroduced Gilad, now also called "Warmaster." He and his two brothers, the sons of Vikings named Mog and Nin, are collectively called the "Eternal Warriors" and share immortality with others over the centuries, creating the "Forever Family." The series started with the 1997 graphic novel Eternal Warriors: Time and Treachery by writer Art Holcomb and artists Doug Wheatley and John Floyd. The series ended in 1998 after five more graphic novels. In chronological order, they were: Eternal Warriors: Digital Alchemy, Eternal Warriors: Archer & Armstong, Eternal Warriors: Blackworks, Eternal Warriors: Mog, and Eternal Warriors: The Immortal Enemy.

=== Valiant Entertainment ===
Acclaim Entertainment declared bankruptcy in 2007 and the newly created Valiant Entertainment, Inc. bought the rights to many characters, including Gilad. This resulted in a second relaunch/reboot of the Valiant Universe. After a successful relaunch of Valiant Comics in 2012, Valiant Entertainment teased a new Eternal Warrior series at the Baltimore Comic-Con in September 2012. Eternal Warrior (Volume 2) by writer Greg Pak and artist Trevor Hairsine debuted in September 2013, running for 8 issues. The series said Gilad and his brothers were given immortality by an advanced device, and that Gilad was chosen directly by the Earth to be a warrior serving alongside the Geomancers; if he refused this role, it would upset the balance of Earth and lead to suffering for humanity. The series also puts him in conflict with two of his own children. Afterward, the 2014 mini-series Eternal Warrior: Days of Steel ran for 3 issues, written by Peter Milligan with art by Cary Nord and Brian Reber.

In 2015, Valiant published the crossover mini-series Book of Death by Robert Venditti and Robert Gill, with art by Doug Braithwaite. The mini-series concluded with Gilad sacrificing his life to protect a child and the new Geomancer, with the Earth releasing him from his role and allowing him to rest. This was followed by Wrath of the Eternal Warrior in 2014, where Gilad leaves the afterlife and fights to return to Earth. The series was done by the creative team of Robert Venditti, Raul Allen, and Patricia Martin, ending after 14 issues in 2015. In 2017, Gilad appeared in the 25th anniversary one-shot comic Eternal Warrior: Awakening by Robert Venditti, Renato Guedes, and Ulisses Arreola. In 2019, Gilad appeared in the 4-issue mini-series Incursion written by Andy Diggle and Alex Paknadel with art by Doug Braithwaite

== Fictional character biography ==
=== Valiant Comics 1992–1996 ===
Gilad Anni-Padda is born in a village of Anatolia in 3268 BC. He is the son of a warrior named Vandal, along with his older brother Ivar and younger brother Aram. After the death of their mother during Aram's birth, Ivar leaves the village in grief. Another tribe attacks the same day, forcing Vandal to flee with Gilad and Aram while the other villagers are killed. Adopting a new home, Gilad and Aram learn they are immortals with enhanced physical abilities (the same is true of Ivar, who learns he can also walk through time). In 3257 BC, at the age of eleven, Gilad emerges victorious from his first battle. One of the bravest of a warrior tribe, his aggression in battle leads some to say he possesses the "Leopard Spirit."

In 3219 BC, Gilad and Aram's adopted tribe battles the superior weaponry of the Mesopotamians. All of the tribe is killed with the exception of Gilad, Aram, and Gilad's first son Kalam, whose life is spared. Learning Kalam has been adopted by Mesopotamians, Gilad decides to let the mortal boy live his own life. He travels along a Geomancer sorcerer for a time, fighting threats when he must, while Aram spends his immortal life preferring to seek pleasure, adventure and drink.

Gilad leads many lives, usually keeping his first name whenever he adopts a new identity. Occasionally he fathers children, each of whom possesses great strength and better than average resiliency to injury, but each of whom is also said to eventually be "black of heart" or "psychopathic," often leading Gilad to later kill them. Deciding this must be an inherent curse of his genetics, Gilad decides by the late 17th century to avoid fathering children again. Through many battles over thousands of years, he becomes a master at combat, military tactics, and stealth. This, combined with his enhanced strength, speed, reflexes, resiliency, and healing, all make him a formidable opponent against those he considers evil or too corrupt to live. Sometimes he works with the speakers of the Earth, the Geomancers (who consider him the "Fist and Steel" of the Earth), as well as alongside other heroes.

In 210 BC, Gilad fights General Cheng. Though the villain dies, he reincarnates repeatedly throughout history, having many faces and lives, always recalling past lives, always pursuing evil. This person of many identities becomes Gilad's "Immortal Enemy." In every incarnation, the Immortal Enemy's eyes remain the same: one green and one brown. In 1695, Gilad fights alongside William III against the Immortal Enemy, who at this time is known as Victor II. Gilad kills him on the battlefield (although historically, Victor II died in bed in 1730) but the villain's soul then inhabits Gilad's own baby son who is born the next day. Over two decades later, Gilad kills his adult son, recognizing him as his foe, "the Reincarnator."

Gilad occasionally reunites with his brothers Aram and Ivar, and the three of them even inspire the story of The Three Musketeers. Over time, Aram finds Gilad too coldhearted and ruthless, worrying the man considers his own judgment to have greater authority than others. Eventually, Aram takes on the name Armstrong, later becoming the guardian and assistant of a young man named Obadiah Archer.

In the 20th century, Gilad becomes friends with the new Geomancer, a young man named Geoff. He makes an enemy of mob assassin Angelo Mortalli but then helps the man after Angelo loses his memory and is transformed into the warrior Bloodshot. Gilad decides not to hold a grudge, saying that Mortalli metaphorically "died" when Bloodshot was "born." During the Unity crisis, Gilad meets a version of himself who lives in the 41st century and battles evil alongside the last Rai warrior and Magnus, Robot Fighter.

=== Acclaim Entertainment 1997–1998 ===
Long ago, the Viking warrior Mog has a wife Nin (a woman with one green eye and one brown eye) and three sons: Gilad, Ivar and Aram. Mog discovers a special herb he believes is connected to the gods. Calling it the Bloom, Mog shares it with their young sons, who begin growing rapidly and show increased physical abilities. Consuming the plant regularly, Mog gains a form of immortality and begins to hear voices he thinks are gods telling him it is his destiny to dominate Earth. When Nin shows concern for him, Mog decides she is jealous of his power and stabs her fatally. To save his mother, Ivar pushes her into the river where the Bloom plant was found. Mog destroys his village in a rage, then continues pursuing murder and conquest over the centuries. Eventually, he gains enough control over his rage to act clandestinely when he must. Nin, transformed by the Bloom, repeatedly confronts Mog, becoming his Immortal Enemy.

Reaching adulthood, Mog's sons realize they are ageless and nearly invulnerable. Working against threats to humanity, they become known as the Eternal Warriors. As the centuries go on, the three Eternal Warriors occasionally choose those they deem worthy to become immortal as well, sharing the Bloom with them. Those chosen become known as the Forever Family, and together they and mortal allies work in secret to fight evil and influence humanity for the better. Many of the Forever Family leave their old names behind, renaming themselves after weapons or items of significance. The three Eternal Warriors also earn individual titles among the Forever Family. Ivar, who discovers how to fold time and travel through the sub-dimension of "netherspace," earns the title Timewalker. Aram, also nicknamed "the Mighty Arm-Strong," becomes an Earth-based sorcerer known as a Geomancer. Gilad becomes known as Warmaster. Ivar later implies he is Judas Iscariot, and that he kept only one of the 30 pieces of silver as a reminder of the betrayal of Jesus.

In the modern-day, the Eternal Warriors have a hidden community in the Palazzo base in Rome that includes the Forever Family, several human allies, and the Neo-Vals, the last surviving descendants of the original Vikings. One of their own betrays the other immortals, destroying their bodies so catastrophically they do not survive. This betrayal and the recent rise of superhumans and alien invaders lead Gilad to consider taking drastic action to protect humanity. He considers using a powerful "Harvest Device" to wipe out all life on the planet while he, the Forever Family, and their allies remain hidden and safe. Then they will emerge and restart society on Earth. Believing this plan is too extreme, Aram defies Gilad and disrupts the operation.

The brothers eventually soon work together again against threats such as the corrupt organization Blackworks, whose leader Donald Kelvin discovers Mog. The father of the Eternal Warriors uses Blackworks resources to wage war, demanding leadership of the Forever Family and domination of Earth. To fight Mog, Ivar frees his imprisoned mother Nin. After several battles, Mog is defeated and the Eternal Warriors decide their efforts to help humanity have caused as much harm as good. They disband the Forever Family and go their separate ways.

=== Valiant Entertainment Reboot 2012 ===
Six thousand years ago in the ancient Mesopotamian city-state of Ur, Gilad Anni-Prada is a normal man with two older brothers, Ivar the engineer and Aram "the strong," and a younger sister Vexana. A fearsome warrior, Gilad spends time with wild beasts in order to learn their ways of hunting and killing. One day, the three brothers journey into the strange realm of Utnapishtim, also called "the Faraway." During their quest, they meet the Keepers of the Timeless Word, an order that safeguards a machine known as the Boon which sustains life in the Faraway, keeping it a timeless place without death. They take the machine but Gilad is fatally wounded. Ivar and Aram return to Ur and Vexana is grief-stricken, leaving Gilad's deathbed and fleeing the city. Ivar believes the Boon can restore Gilad and activates it with Aram. The Boom drains the life force from the thousands who inhabit Ur and a massive explosion occurs, the Great Cataclysm. All those in Ur and the surrounding areas are killed, the city now in ruins. As a result, Gilad is not only resurrected, he and his two brothers are now immortals with enhanced bodies and minds (though the scars on Gilad's face remain). The three brothers eventually go their separate ways, with Ivar becoming the Timewalker and Aram later adopting the name Armstrong.

Vexana is also killed by the blast but then resurrected by dark spirits that grant her immortality and the ability to warp emotions. Seeing her home destroyed, Vexana worries her survival means she might be responsible for the Great Cataclysm. She leaves, her grief blocking out much of her memory and warping her mind. She becomes the War-Monger, a self-styled "agent of chaos" sparking conflicts around the world. At times she comes into conflict with her brothers but does not recognize them.

Gilad Anni-Padda becomes one of the greatest warriors on the planet. Over time, he regularly works with Earth's Geomancers who tell him of threats he must stop. While a Geomancer conveys the voice of the Earth and is "the Seer of Earth and Stone," Gilad is the "Fist and Steel of the Earth" and together they serve the planet. The Geomancers insist that without Gilad's help, Earth will fall out of balance. At times, Gilad seemingly dies and has visions of the Earth speaking to him through avatars, telling him he cannot rest yet even if he wishes and must return to life.

In Ancient Mesopotamia, Gilad leads his forces against cult followers of the death god Nergal. Gilad's daughter Xaran joins the battle. Against her father's wishes, and arguing that it is a weakness to not use the methods of their enemies, Xaran not only kills soldiers but also targets the cult's women and children as well. When her brother Mitu tries to stop her, Xaran kills him and then battles Gilad next, who seemingly kills her instead. Following this, Gilad continues to fight for the Earth alongside the Geomancers, but now has grave misgivings. He lives a nomadic experience, more solitary than before, but occasionally makes allies and friends such as Aric of Dacia (now Romania), a Visigoth living in the Roman Empire in the 5th century. By the Middle Ages, Gilad wonders if his actions and battles have all been meaningless. On a few occasions, Gilad fights Vexana, neither recognizing each other.

In 1130 in Iran, Gilad joins forces with his brother Armstrong against the Null, a cult that worships entropy and nothingness. Along with many warriors and agents, the Null has a living algorithm ("an ancient artificial intelligence") that infects the mind of a person, destroying their personality and using the host body to become a deadly agent. This entity that constantly infects new host bodies is called "the Immortal Enemy" by the story, though Gilad refers to it as "the Last Enemy." Throughout the centuries, Gilad battles it many times, in many forms.

When a Geomancer tells Gilad to kill a woman and her child because their lives will lead to a rise in evil, he refuses. Abdicating his post as the Fist and Steel of Earth, he decides he will choose his battles on his own terms.

==== Unit Y and Unity ====
During World War I, Gilad becomes the leader of "Unit Y," a task force made of British and American fighters that took on special missions deemed too risky or dangerous for standard military units. The other members of Unit Y included: Dell, Alpha, and Breaker. During the war, they fought War-Monger, imprisoning her in a sealed tomb (though an earthquake freed her twenty years later). With the exception of Gilad, the entire team lost their lives towards the end of the war, sacrificing themselves to stop a mustard gas weapon. After returning home, Gilad suggested that the Unit Y program not be abandoned and might be needed in the future. Later similar groups are known simply as the "Unity" team, and there is another group later called "United."

Gilad continues fighting evil, working for MI-6 for a time to protect Alan Turing, and later attempting to protect JFK from assassination. When his brother Armstrong and the young warrior Obadiah Archer stop an evil cult called the Sect from reactivating the Boon, a Geomancer is killed in the process. Sensing the death, Gilad attempts to take vengeance on Archer and Armstrong before being convinced to stop by the new Geomancer. The group then joins forces against the Null and once again Gilad faces the Last Enemy.

After helping thwart the Null's plans, Gilad is visited by Xaran, still alive due to inheriting his immortality, and learns she serves the Earth in her own way. The two join forces against his son Mitu, who has become an immortal champion of Nergal. As a consequence of his abandoning the fight against evil, Gilad learns he will be forced to serve the Earth again in two thousand years to stop the final followers of Nergal.

Gilad teams with his long-estranged brother Armstrong to stop the nihilistic cult called the Null. Later on, Gilad reluctantly joins forces with Toyo Harada to stop Aric of Dacia, now known as the armored warrior X-O Manowar, who has returned to Earth after being abducted and enslaved by aliens centuries ago. After a superhuman task force called Unity fails Aric, Gilad forms a new Unity team alongside Ninjak and Livewire. After reaching an understanding with X-O Manowar, they all become allies. Gilad, Ninjak, and Livewire continue working together as Unity to protect Earth from major threats, including aliens and War-Monger.

==== Death and return ====
The Unity team later attempts to stop the villain Master Darque from usurping the power of the Geomancer and becoming master of Earth. Gilad suffers serious physical damage to save an innocent child and help Tama, the new Geomancer. Darque is defeated and Tama tells Gilad the Earth releases him and he can rest now and not return if he wishes. Gilad dies.

Gilad finds himself in an afterlife where he is united with his lost children from different ages, as well as a lost love of his. But after deciding that he cannot rest when he knows there are heroes still fighting to protect Earth, and once again believing his actions do make a difference, he leaves behind his loved ones and battles his way back to the land of the living. He resumes his role as one of Earth's protectors.

In the post-apocalyptic 41st century, Gilad (now known to some as the Eternal Emperor) stands guard over an agricultural village atop the ruins of Little Rock, Arkansas. Later leading people into battle against the new incarnation of the death cult of Nergal, he hopes their threat is finally ended and wants to live in peace with his community and granddaughter Caroline. But seeing Caroline and others showing interest in lost technology and weapons, he fears people will repeat the same mistakes that led to humanity's destruction. In 4001 CE, a Rai warrior finds Gilad and recruits him in his efforts to free the current Geomancer from New Japan.

== Powers and abilities ==
=== Original Valiant continuity ===
Like his siblings, Gilad is ageless and immune to disease and poison. He possesses superhuman strength, enhanced speed and reflexes, and greater resistance to injury than an ordinary human. His body can heal from various injuries, and his millennia of experience have made him highly skilled in various forms of combat and weponary.

=== Acclaim continuity ===
In the Acclaim Entertainment Comics continuity, the powers and abilities of Gilad are pretty much the same. However, immortals can still be killed by catastrophic injury, such as having most of their flesh and muscle destroyed, having their heads destroyed, or being bisected across the mid-section.

=== 2012 Valiant continuity ===
Since 2012, the comics have said that a mysterious machine known as the Boon not only made Gilad and his brothers immortal and enhanced their bodies but also enhanced their mind. The three brothers now have minds with unlimited storage and analytical capacity, as well as perfect recall when necessary. Even if the brain is destroyed and must later regenerate, all memories and knowledge are retained. The Boon also equips the mind with a unique form of apathy, so that emotions do not play a prominent role in their thought processes (although they do still feel them). This makes them immune to depression and other forms of mental illness, allowing them to experience eternity without losing their sanity over time.

== Collected editions ==
Title	Material collected	Published date	ISBN
Valiant Comics
Eternal Warrior Classic Omnibus Vol. 1	Eternal Warrior (vol. 1) #1–25, Eternal Warrior Yearbook #1, Archer & Armstrong (vol. 1) #25, Harbinger (vol. 1) #32, Secret Weapons (vol. 1) #3, 6–10, Valiant Era Companion #1	July 2023	978-1682154304
Valiant Entertainment
Eternal Warrior Vol. 1: Sword of the Wild	Eternal Warrior (vol. 2) #1-4	February 2014	978-1939346209
Eternal Warrior Vol. 2: Eternal Emperor	Eternal Warrior (vol. 2) #5-8	July 2014	978-1939346292
Eternal Warrior: Days of Steel	Eternal Warrior: Days of Steel #1-3	April 2015	978-1939346742
Wrath of the Eternal Warrior Vol. 1: Risen	Wrath of the Eternal Warrior #1-4	May 2016	978-1682151235
Wrath of the Eternal Warrior Vol. 2: Labyrinth	Wrath of the Eternal Warrior #5-10	November 2016	978-1682151594
Wrath of the Eternal Warrior Vol. 3: A Deal With a Devil	Wrath of the Eternal Warrior #11-14	March 2017	978-1682151976
Wrath of the Eternal Warrior Deluxe Edition	Wrath of the Eternal Warrior #1-14, Eternal Warrior: Awakening #1	May 2018	978-1682152515
Incursion	Incursion #1-4	July 2019	978-1682153031

== In other media ==
=== Web series ===
Eternal Warrior appears in the web series Ninjak vs. the Valiant Universe portrayed by John Morrison.

=== Film adaptation ===
In August 2017, Dave Bautista was announced to be in talks to play the Gilad the Eternal Warrior in a solo movie. The 2020 Bloodshot movie was meant to be the first of several films taking place in a shared Valiant Comics Cinematic Universe that would include characters such as Gilad. After largely poor reception to the film, and with many studio projects on hold or rescheduled due to the COVID-19 pandemic, the status of an Eternal Warrior movie is unclear.
