= Geomancers (comics) =

Group of comic book characters from Valiant Comics

Geomancer

Publication information
- Publisher: Valiant Comics
- First appearance: Solar, Man of the Atom #10 (June, 1992)
- Created by: Jim Shooter; Don Perlin

In-story information
- Alter ego: Khanit; Buck McHenry; Geoff McHenry; Lucinda Mendez; Yuri Pierce; Ana Kawainui; Rokland Tate; Aram Anni-Padda; Kay McHenry; Karana
- Partnerships: Gilad Anni-Padda
- Notable aliases: Speaker of The Earth
- Abilities: Telepathic communication with the Earth; Receive psychic impressions from objects Control over nature and the universe's natural energy sources Ability to cause objects to bend to their will

Geomancers are a group of fictional comic book characters that appeared in various titles published by Valiant Comics.

== Publication history ==
=== Original Valiant continuity ===
The Geomancers appeared in various comic titles published by Valiant Comics, including Eternal Warrior, Archer and Armstrong, Doctor Solar, Rai, Timewalker, Magnus and Secret Weapons. A separate Geomancer comic series was published in 1994, lasting eight issues.

== Fictional character biography ==
=== Original Valiant continuity ===
Geomancers are a lineage of men and women who, since 3500 BC, have been chosen by the Earth itself to defend it, with one Geomancer operating at a time. In the Viking era, it was a young boy. When a Geomancer dies, his or her chosen successor takes their place. When a Geomancer has reached the end of their life-cycle their power is removed by a suicide ritual called Bagh-Nakh.

Geomancers were instrumental in many pivotal events in the Valiant Universe, including the Unity Conflict, the birth and upbringing of Magnus, Robot Fighter, the struggle against the Darque Power and the Harbinger Wars. Gilad Anni-Padda served as the "Fist and Steel" of the Geomancers for most of his life, failing three times to save a Geomancer. In 1992, Geomancer Tashi Khatun authored a book entitled The Book of Geomancer, the tome of ultimate knowledge.

The first Geomancer was Khanit, who was chosen in 3500 BC. Later Geomancers included Buck McHenry, Geoff McHenry, Lucinda Mendez, Yuri Pierce, Ana Kawainui, Rokland Tate and Aram Anni-Padda.

=== 2012 Valiant continuity ===
In the second Valiant continuity, Kay McHenry serves as the Geomancer. Being a great grand-niece of the late Buck McHenry, she first appears in issue #6 of Archer & Armstrong volume 2.

== Powers and abilities ==
Geomancers can psychically communicate with the Earth, receive psychic impressions from objects and living organisms, possess innate healing abilities, read minds, control over nature and its energy sources and cause objects to bend to their will.

== See also ==
- Geomancy
