= The Second Life of Doctor Mirage =

18-issue American comic book series

Doctor Mirage
- Doctor Hwen Mirage, art by Bernard Chang.

Publication information
- Publisher: Valiant Comics
- First appearance: Shadowman (vol. 1) #16 (1993)

In-story information
- Alter ego: Hwen Mirage
- Notable aliases: Hwen Dong Fong, Hwen Fong, Dr. Fong, Dr. Dong, Doctor Mirage
- Abilities: Manipulation of the Darque power (energy from death)

The Second Life of Doctor Mirage is an 18-issue American comic book series co-created by writer/artist Bob Layton and illustrator Bernard Chang, and published by Valiant Comics. More than two million comics in the series have been sold since it was published from 1993–1995. The Second Life of Dr. Mirage has been translated into German, Italian, Spanish, Norwegian, Filipino, Chinese, and other languages.

In a 1994 interview, Bob Layton said that the book was originally created after talking with a close friend who was discouraged that so few comic books catered to the female audience

== Characters and story ==
SLDM #1 debuted in the top ten comics sold, August, 1993.

Hwen and Carmen Mirage are parapsychologists who investigate paranormal activity and supernatural mysteries. They are hired to investigate two necromantically charged corpses, which come to life and attack them. During the fight, the corpses reveal the name of their master, Master Darque, a necromantic sorcerer. Hwen begins a journey to find Darque.

Hwen pursues Master Darque to Ladakh, Tibet. Master Darque attempts to absorb Hwen's life force, but is thwarted by Carmen's love for Hwen just as Darque's power reaches its peak. Carmen and Hwen attempt an escape, but are attacked by undead priests, at which point Hwen discovers his own ability to control energy. Hwen’s new ability and Carmen’s martial arts expertise prove to be beyond Darque’s control, and they strike an uneasy truce.

Hwen soon realizes he has been transformed into a “positively charged” necromantic being. This transformation means Hwen cannot come into physical contact with other people. This puts a strain on Hwen and Carmen’s marriage as they attempt to return to normal life. Subsequently Hwen receives training to harness his powers and can become solid for short periods of time. Eventually, Hwen acquires the ability to change the appearance of his clothing.

Hwen and Carmen believe they have found a friend in Enrico, who agrees to manage their home when they travel for investigations. Enrico appears to be easygoing and helpful, but is later found to be keeping dark secrets.

A house becomes charged with necromantic energy and gives shape to the angry spirit within. Hwen and Carmen investigate the home, which is destroyed due to a gas leak. During the destruction, necromantic energy is released and is absorbed by Hwen.

More problems come when it becomes known that Carmen's parents despise Hwen, as does Carmen's ex-husband, who is even more dangerous. These problems come to the forefront as a body-manipulating foe seeks to suck the 'dark energy' out of Carmen.

== Darque Power (necromantic energy) ==
In the series, Darque Power is the name given to the necromantic energy released when humans die. Named for Master Darque, the world's most infamous necromancer, the energy can be used in several types of magic spells and incantations. Silver is the only known conductor for Darque Power energy. Electromagnetic pulses can disrupt the flow of Darque Power energy forces.

== Books ==
Second Life of Doctor Mirage #1–#18 (1993–1995)
