= Harbinger (comic book) =

American comic book series

- Cover art for Harbinger Deluxe Edition Vol. 1 HC. Art by Mico Suayan.

Publication information
- Publisher: Valiant Comics
- Schedule: Monthly
- Format: Ongoing series
- Genre: Superhero
- Publication date: January 1992 – June 1995 (Valiant Comics); June 2012 – July 2014 (Valiant Entertainment)
- No. of issues: 41
- Main character: Peter Stanchek

Creative team
- Created by: Jim Shooter; David Lapham
- Written by: Jim Shooter (Valiant Comics); Joshua Dysart (Valiant Entertainment)
- Artist(s): David Lapham (Valiant Comics); Khari Evans (Valiant Entertainment)

Collected editions
- Harbinger: The Beginning: ISBN 0979640903

Harbinger is an American comic book series published by Valiant Comics about a group of teenage super-powered outcasts known as Harbingers.

Harbinger initially featured writing and art by Jim Shooter and David Lapham. After Acclaim Entertainment purchased the rights to the Valiant catalog for $65 million in 1994, the characters were rebooted in Harbinger: Acts of God to make them more easily adaptable to video games. They continued to appear in many Valiant titles, most prominently the Unity 2000 series. Harbinger was one of the best selling Valiant titles with total sales in all languages of over five million comics.

== Publication history ==
Harbinger debuted with Harbinger #1 in January 1992.

In 2008, Valiant released Harbinger: The Beginning, a deluxe hardcover collecting the first seven issues. Harbinger: The Beginning reached #2 on Amazon.com’s graphic novels sales charts and within the top #300 of all books sold on Amazon.

In June 2012, Valiant Entertainment relaunched the Harbinger title as a new ongoing series, written by Joshua Dysart and illustrated by Khari Evans.

== Characters ==
=== Harbinger Resistance ===
- Charlene Dupre (Flamingo) Flamingo has the power to generate and control flames.
- Peter Stanchek (Sting) Sting is a psionic of extraordinary power and potential. Once a student of Toyo Harada, he decided to break away when Harada arranged the murder of Pete's best friend. Together with Kris, Zephyr, Flamingo and Torque, Sting tries to thwart the plans of Harada and his Harbinger Foundation.
- John Torkelson (Torque) Torque was a mechanic in Georgia before Sting released his powers of enormous strength and durability. In the beginning, Torque seemed very hostile and distant, but he has proven himself a loyal and valuable member of the group.
- Faith Herbert (Zephyr) Zephyr, known as Faith to her friends, has the telekinetic ability to fly. She is also able to generate a 'companion field', a telekinetic force field she can use as defensive protection against attacks for herself and/or others. So far, her field appears to deflect physical, kinetic and focused electromagnetic energy, though heat and other environmental effects may be able to travel through the field. When she expands her companion field to allies, she can levitate them within an unknown radius around her as she flies. Her force field allows air, ambient light, and sound to pass through but, at the cost of limiting the air capacity to support breathing within the field, she can intensify its impermeability to prevent even those phenomenae from entering her field. The companion field's carrying capacity is unknown. Founder of the Harbinger Resistance.
- Kris Hathaway - Although not possessing super powers of her own, Kris is still an important member of Sting's renegades. Her level head and intelligence keeps the team together and in focus of their goal.

=== Harbinger Foundation ===
- Puff
- Eel
- Toyo Harada - The most powerful psionic on Earth, Harada commands the full spectrum of psionic abilities, including telepathy, telekinesis, mind-control, and many other deadly talents. Fearing that humanity may eventually destroy itself, Harada decided early in his life to preserve the planet by clandestinely conquering it. To this end, he established the Harbinger Foundation to recruit others with paranormal abilities, whom Harada refers to as "Harbingers of the next step in human evolution". He seldom confronts his enemies directly, preferring to leave such dirty-work to his elite Harbinger warriors, the "Eggbreakers". With tremendous economic and political clout, Harada seems close to achieving his goals, and is ready to destroy anyone who stands in his way.
- Lump
- Rock
- Thumper
- Sparrow
- Weasel
- Blast
- Swallow
- Warp
- Flashbulb
- Tse-tse
- Ghost
- Taser
- Gridlock
- Mak

(formerly)

- Stronghold
- Livewire

=== Unaffiliated Harbingers ===
Ax - an unstable Harbinger with the power similar to that of Geomancers, except in his case, it only extends to technological devices. It is also quite similar to The abilities displayed by Bloodshot and XO Manowar to communicate with and control technology. He is introduced in issue 3 of Harbinger when he is recruited by the team to break into Harada's protected files. Although they sense his moral ambiguity, Sting activated his Harbinger power. After a disastrous caper on the dark side of the moon, the team learn that Ax cannot be trusted and Sting considers taking his powers away. Ultimately they decide to leave him with his powers, though they understood the risk he posed. Ax then embarked on a life of crime, which brought him into conflict with both Bloodshot and XO Manowar. Although he wasn't able to steal their technology, Ax's powers continued to grow and he found himself in a race with Harada to acquire the "blood of heroes" (the nanites in Bloodshot's blood). Ax killed Bloodshot on a moonbase in 2028. His time with the blood of heroes was short, but he copied his personality into a hidden computer file within the nanites before being killed by Harada's troops. The file lay hidden for centuries before being accidentally opened by Rai in the distant future. Ax struggled to gain control of the body but is eventually trapped in a virtual reality world where he reigns as supreme ruler.

Obadiah Archer (Archer) - a Harbinger with hyper-perception and enhanced coordination and reflexes. He is frequently partnered with the immortal Armstrong. In the future, he wound up marrying Flamingo. He founded a spiritual movement known as Archies which endured into the 41st century.

Angelo Mortalli (Bloodshot) - Although it was the nanotech enhancements given to him as part of Project Rising Spirit that granted him most of his superhuman abilities (super strength, speed, coordination, healing), the hero known as "Bloodshot" also had the innate Harbinger ability to communicate with and control machines.

- Eugene Mutholland (Bazooka)
- Frank C. Treese (Fort)
- Donald W. Tietz (Spikeman)

=== Others ===
- Amanda McKee (Livewire) Harada recruited Amanda and other like-minded (in other words, violent) individuals into his Eggbreakers, the squad of enforcers who did Harada's dirty work. She was given the codename Livewire, due to her power to manipulate electromagnetic forces; she especially enjoyed using a length of magnetically animated cable as a weapon.
- Edward Sedgewick (Stronghold) was a member of the Harbinger Foundation of would-be Harbinger messiah Toyo Harada. Edward was given the nickname Stronghold and recruited into the "Eggbreakers" enforcer squad. He had the power to psionically absorb mass from objects around him and use it to increase his own size and strength to gigantic proportions. When he killed a fellow Harbinger, he realized that the Foundation was not right for him and fled with his partner Livewire. Stronghold and Livewire were later recruited by the Geomancer Geoff McHenry to battle villain Doctor Eclipse, a servant of Master Darque.

== Plot ==
When Solar recreated the world that became known as the Valiant Universe, a number of super-powered beings emerged. The most notable of those were Harbingers, human beings with a wide range of psionic powers. Throughout history, their powers tended to lie dormant, emerging in occasional bursts that were usually brought on by stress. That changed when Toyo Harada, a Japanese-born Harbinger, established the Harbinger Foundation. He hoped to study the Harbingers and the full extent of their powers. He discovered that he was what he dubbed an Omega Harbinger, a Harbinger who possessed a full range of Harbinger potential, and could activate the latent powers of other Harbingers. Harada decided to use his powers and resources to change the world for the better, no matter the cost. He began recruiting other Harbingers and creating programs to teach them how to better use their powers. The most skilled recruits became Eggbreakers, Harada's elite enforcers charged with containing renegade Harbingers, among other things.

In the early 1990s, the Harbinger Foundation discovered the existence of Peter Stanchek, the only other Omega Harbinger that existed at the time. Harada hoped that he would become a valuable ally. However, Pete discovered the truth behind Harada's ultimate plan after his close friend, who was outspoken against the Harbinger Foundation and their methods, was murdered by Harada's assassins and an attempt was made to kill Pete Stanchek as well. Stanchek fled the Foundation, taking his girlfriend with him, and decided to stop the Harbinger Foundation from reaching its goals. To that end, they recruited other Harbingers, and undermined Harada's plans in any way they could.

== Valiant Comics (1992-1995) ==
Harbingers, also known as psiots, are a race of evolved superhumans with psionic powers in the Valiant Universe. The world's most powerful Harbinger is Toyo Harada, a Japanese businessman who runs the mysterious Harbinger Foundation. The Foundation recruits and trains Harbingers as part of Harada's private army. There are some who believe Harada is an evil megalomaniac, including teenager Peter Stanchek, the only Harbinger whose power rivals that of Harada. Stanchek, also known by the codename Sting, leads a group of young Harbingers called the Renegades against Harada. This group includes Charlene Dupre, a pyrokinetic codenamed Flamingo; Faith Herbert, an overweight flying nerd codenamed Zephyr; John Torkelson, a super-strong behemoth named Torque; and the regular human Kris Hathaway. They live their lives on the run while being constantly pursued by Harada's organization.

=== Harbinger #0 ===
Harbinger #0 (1993) from Valiant Comics' first volume, is the prequel to the Harbinger series and details how Peter Stanchek became involved with the Harbinger Foundation and came to oppose Harada. Each issue of Harbinger from #1 through #6 contained a numbered coupon. Each coupon also featured one panel of a six panel story by Jim Shooter that told the origin of Toyo Harada. A new hardcover collection (Harbinger: The Beginning) featured a new story by Jim Shooter, "Origin of Harada", which presumably fleshes out the story that appeared on the coupons. When a set of coupons was collected and sent to Valiant a copy of Harbinger #0 Pink Cover Mail Away Variant could be redeemed. The book became highly sought, reaching prices as high as $300 in back issue trading. A blue cover version was eventually released to meet demand. Today, the Pink Cover Mail Away Version of Harbinger #0 is still one of the most sought after Valiant books.

The #0 issue of the 2012 reboot explores instead the origin of Toyo Harada as a World War II survivor and his eventual endeavors with his conglomerate using the Harbingers as a war tool.

== Awards and recognition ==
- Ain't It Cool News named "Harbinger" Best Superteam 2012.
- Comic Book Resources named Harbinger among the Top 100 Comics of 2012.
- A Comic Show named Harbinger one of the "12 Best of 2012".
- MTV named Harbinger one of "MTV Geek's Best Comic Series Of 2012".
- Harbinger was named among the "Top Twelve Titles of 2012" by Mind of Scott.
- Comic Impact named Joshua Dysart the Best Writer in 2013.
- CraveOnline named Harbinger one of the "Best Comics of 2013."
- Ain't It Cool News named Toyo Harada Favorite Super Villain in 2013.
- Harbinger Wars was named Best Crossover for 2013 by Ain't It Cool News.

=== Nominations ===
- 2014 Harvey Award Nominations:
  - Best Graphic Album - Previously Published: Harbinger Volume 1: Omega Rising, Valiant Entertainment
  - Most Promising New Talent: Pere Perez, Harbinger Wars, Valiant Entertainment
  - Special Award for Excellence in Presentation: Harbinger Wars, Josh Johns and Warren Simons, Valiant Entertainment

== Collected editions ==
Part of the original series has been collected into volumes:

- Harbinger: Children of the Eighth Day (collects Harbinger #1–4, softcover, Valiant, 1992)
- Harbinger: The Beginning (collects Harbinger #0–7 and new story by Jim Shooter, hardcover, 200 pages, August 2007, ISBN 0-9796409-0-3)
- Valiant Masters: Harbinger Volume 1 – Children of the Eighth Day (collects Harbinger #0–7 and includes bonus material such as process art, sketches, and more rarely seen back-up material from the Valiant vault, hardcover, 200 pages, March 2015, ISBN 978-1939346483)

In addition, the new series (by Joshua Dysart) is being collected into volumes as well:

- Harbinger Vol. 1: Omega Rising (collects Harbinger #1–5)
- Harbinger Vol. 2: Renegades (collects Harbinger #6–10)
- Harbinger Vol. 3: Harbinger Wars (collects Harbinger #11–14, 0)
- Harbinger Vol. 4: Perfect Day (collects Harbinger #15–19)
- Harbinger Vol. 5: Death of a Renegade (collects Harbinger #20–25)
- Harbinger Vol. 6: Omegas (collects Harbinger: Omega #1-3 and Harbinger: Bleeding Monk #0)

Additionally, the series has begun being collected into Deluxe Edition hardcovers:

- Harbinger: Deluxe Edition Vol. 1 (collects Harbinger #1-14, 0)
- Harbinger: Deluxe Edition Vol. 2 (collects Harbinger #15-25, Harbinger: Omegas #1-3, and Harbinger: Bleeding Monk #0.)

== In other media ==
=== Film ===
In March 2008, it was announced that Paramount Pictures acquired the rights to a film adaptation, enlisting Brett Ratner as director. In April 2015, Valiant Entertainment, Sony Pictures and Neal H. Moritz's Original Film announced a five-picture deal to bring the publisher's heroes to the big screen, which included a Harbinger film. Moritz, Toby Jaffe and Dinesh Shamdasani would produce it from a script by Eric Heisserer. Harbinger would then have a sequel and crossover film, Harbinger Wars, with Bloodshot.

By November 2018, it was reported that Justin Tipping would direct the film, with a script co-written by Heisserer, Tipping and Joshua Beirne-Golden. However, Sony subsequently sold the rights to the Valiant Universe to Paramount Pictures in September 2019, with the film reentering development. In February 2022, Deadline reported that Wes Ball was to direct a Harbinger film written by Andrew Lanham. Later that year in June, Ball stepped down from his role so that he could focus on his role as director of a Planet of the Apes trilogy. Paul Downs Colaizzo entered early negotiations to serve as director, as well as to rewrite the previous draft of the script.

=== Web series ===
- The character of Faith was initially announced to appear in the web series Ninjak vs. the Valiant Universe, although she ultimately did not, but Livewire did.
