= Archer & Armstrong =

- Cover to Archer & Armstrong Vol. 2 #1. Art by Mico Suayan.

Publication information
- Publisher: Valiant Comics
- First appearance: Original: Archer & Armstrong Vol. 1 #0 (July 1992); Acclaim Entertainment: Eternal Warriors: Time & Treachery (1997); Valiant Reboot: Archer & Armstrong Vol. 2 #1 (2012)
- Created by: Jim Shooter, Bob Layton and Barry Windsor-Smith

In-story information
- Alter ego: Archer: Obadiah "Obie" Archer; Armstrong: Aram Anni-Padda, "Aram the Strong"
- Abilities: Archer: Martial arts Complete body control Mimic any human ability Armstrong: Immortality; Enhanced healing Super-strength

Archer & Armstrong is a superhero duo in the Valiant Comics universe. The two were originally created by writer and artist Barry Windsor-Smith and introduced in their own self-titled comic book series in 1992. After Acclaim Entertainment bought Valiant Comics in 1996, the two characters were rebooted in a series of one-shot comics entitled Eternal Warriors. Valiant Entertainment, Inc. relaunched the Valiant Comics universe yet again in 2012 and Archer & Armstrong Volume 2 introduced a new version of the duo. Their stories are a mix of dark superhero action and comedic adventures.

Obadiah Archer is a young man with a superhuman power that allows him to become a master fighter. After his seemingly devout religious parents turn out to be evil and then attempt to kill him, Archer decides to protect innocent people and stop villainy. He befriends and partners with a hard-drinking and jocular immortal with superhuman strength who calls himself Armstrong. Archer commonly uses a crossbow in combat while Armstrong is known for carrying a magical bottomless satchel containing a large collection of items and weapons. Armstrong is the brother of two other immortal heroes of the Valiant Comics universe: the ruthless Gilad the Eternal Warrior and the manipulative Ivar the Timewalker. Since the 2012 reboot, Armstrong also has an immortal sister, the villain called Vexana the War-Monger.

== Publication history ==
Valiant Comics debuted Archer & Armstrong Volume 1 in 1992 and began with issue #0, a stand-alone story explaining Archer's background and how he met Armstrong. Issues # 1 and #2 were part of "Unity", Valiant's first crossover, and were written by Jim Shooter, Barry Windsor-Smith and Bob Layton, with art by Windsor-Smith. Issues #3–12, written and largely drawn by Windsor-Smith, established the world of the heroic pair and explored their enemy the Sect, an international secret society that had infiltrated most of the world's significant governments and religious organizations.

Originally, there were meant to be only two immortal brothers in the Valiant Comics Universe: Gilad the Eternal Warrior and Aram A.K.A. Armstrong, younger by two years. Archer & Armstrong/Eternal Warrior #8 (a double-sized "flipbook" that was two issues in one) later revealed there was a third brother, Ivar the eldest.

The original Archer & Armstrong series was called "The best buddy team book of all time" by Ain't It Cool News, and "Superhero buddy book of the decade" by Wizard magazine. The series ended in 1994 with issue #26.

In 2008, Valiant released a deluxe hardcover of the Archer & Armstrong origin story, entitled Archer & Armstrong: First Impressions. The hardcover was later named one of the top ten graphic novels of 2008 by Diamond Comic Distributors and one of the best of 2008 by Ain't It Cool News.

Acclaim Entertainment bought Valiant comics in 1994, leading to a reboot of the Valiant characters. In 1997, a one-shot comic series under the banner title Eternal Warriors reintroduced Armstrong and his two brothers as Vikings, the sons of Mog and Nin, who become immortal due to a special plant. Collectively called the "Eternal Warriors", the three brothers fight evil together and share immortality with others over the centuries, creating the "Forever Family". The series started with the 1997 one-shot Eternal Warriors: Time & Treachery by writer Art Holcomb and artists Doug Wheatley and John Floyd. The series ended in 1998 after five more one-shots. In chronological order, they were: Eternal Warriors: Digital Alchemy, Eternal Warriors: Archer & Armstong, Eternal Warriors: Blackworks, Eternal Warriors: Mog, and Eternal Warriors: The Immortal Enemy.

Acclaim Entertainment declared bankruptcy in 2007 and the newly created Valiant Entertainment, Inc. bought back the rights to many characters. Valiant Comics was relaunched in 2012 with a rebooted universe. Archer & Armstrong Volume 2 began in 2012 under the creative team of writer Fred Van Lente and artists Clayton Henry and Brian Reber. Archer's origin was revised and the nature of his powers was altered. Archer & Armstrong Volume 2 #0 revealed that in the new continuity, the three Anni-Prada brothers gained immortality when Ivar activated a strange machine known as the Boon. The device gave them healing abilities, enhanced minds, and seemingly-ageless life by draining the life force from their entire home city-state of Ur. This revised story now said Gilad was the youngest Anni-Prada brother rather than Aram, though Ivar was still the oldest.

== Fictional character biographies ==
=== Valiant Comics Version (1992–1994) ===
Issue #0 published in 1992

Aram Anni-Padda is born in a village of Anatolia over three thousand years before the celebrated birth of Jesus. He is the son of a warrior named Vandal, along with his older brothers Ivar and Gilad. Their mother dies during Aram's birth, and Ivar leaves the village in grief. Another tribe attacks the same day, forcing Vandal to flee with Gilad and Aram while the other villagers are killed. Adopting a new home, Gilad and Aram learn they are immortals with enhanced physical abilities (the same is true of Ivar, who learns he can also walk through time).

In 3219 BC, Gilad and Aram's adopted tribe battles the superior weaponry of the Mesopotamians. All of the tribe is killed with the exception of Gilad, Aram, and Gilad's first son Kalam, who is adopted by Mesopotamians. Gilad becomes a nomadic warrior, traveling alongside a Geomancer sorcerer for a time. Disillusioned with the glory of violence, Aram spends his immortal life preferring to seek pleasure, adventure, and drink. On occasion, he reunites with his brother Gilad, now the ruthless Eternal Warrior, and Ivar the Time Walker. A few exploits of the three brothers even inspire the tales of The Three Musketeers. By the modern-day, Aram is a wandering vagrant constantly searching for company and alcohol. He now uses the name "Armstrong".

Obadiah Archer is a boy in Topeka, Kansas raised by evangelist minister Joe Earl Archer and his wife Thelma Archer. Devoutly religious, Obadiah discovers he has incredible hand-eye coordination and physical skill. After learning their son discovered they were kidnapping and molesting children from their congregation, the Archers set fire to their own home and leave Obadiah bound inside. Promising to bring his parents to justice if God helps him, Obadiah frees himself, but loses consciousness from smoke inhalation. He is found in time by firefighters and taken to the hospital. Obadiah has a near-death experience, seeing a great light and recalling his promise. Knowing his parents will kill him at their first opportunity, and fearing that no one will believe him, Archer sneaks out of the hospital and seeks someone to teach him how to fight. He finds his way to a Buddhist monastery in Ladakh, high in the Himalayas, where he is given sanctuary and lives for the next several years.

The monks observe Obadiah has extraordinary control over his body, a natural talent for martial arts, and flawless skill with a bow and arrow. Young Archer credits this to his near-death experience, believing he died and was brought back by God to enact justice. His desire for revenge is incompatible with the monks' beliefs, so he later leaves the monastery. Returning to the United States, he learns that his parents' crimes were discovered weeks after his departure, and they were arrested and imprisoned. Suddenly unsure of his purpose, he comes across Armstrong, a vagrant who shares stories of being immortal and having had adventures throughout history.

Believing Armstrong is a liar, Archer leaves him and encounters Mahmud, who tells him that his group, the Sect, has been fighting evil and hunting an enemy called "He Who Is Not To Be Named" for over 2,500 years. Archer discovers their target is Armstrong and quickly realizes the Sect is evil. Armstrong explains the Sect is a corrupt international cult whose members have infiltrated every government body and religious organization in the world including the Vatican. Eight hundred members live in Archer's hometown of Topeka.

Escaping imprisonment in Vatican City, Archer & Armstrong embark on a journey through Europe, dealing with attacks by the Sect while encountering a number of adventures and a number of Armstrong's old acquaintances including his former wife Andy (the Greek goddess Andromeda), his brother Gilad (or "Gilly" as Armstrong calls him), and his older brother Ivar the Timewalker. Their adventures also involve the recovery of Armstrong's magical satchel. Along the way, the two learn that Archer's combat talents are due to his being a "psiot" or "harbinger", one of a rare number of humans born with superhuman traits. Archer's ability allows him to mimic any human skill and adapt to various situations.

=== Acclaim Entertainment Version (1997–1998) ===
Long ago, the Viking warrior Mog has a wife Nin (a woman with one green eye and one brown eye) and three sons: Gilad, Ivar and Aram. Mog discovers a special herb he believes is connected to the gods. Calling it the Bloom, Mog shares it with their young sons, who begin growing rapidly and show increased physical abilities. Consuming the plant regularly, Mog gains a form of immortality and begins to hear voices he thinks are gods telling him it is his destiny to dominate Earth. When Nin shows concern for him, Mog decides she is jealous of his power and stabs her fatally. To save his mother, Ivar pushes her into the river where the Bloom plant was found. Mog destroys his village in a rage, then continues pursuing murder and conquest over the centuries. Eventually, he gains enough control over his rage to act clandestinely when he must. Nin, transformed by the Bloom, repeatedly confronts Mog, becoming his "Immortal Enemy".

Reaching adulthood, Mog's sons realize they are ageless and nearly invulnerable. Working against threats to humanity, they become known as the Eternal Warriors. As the centuries go on, the three Eternal Warriors occasionally choose those they deem worthy to become immortal as well, sharing the Bloom with them. Those chosen become known as the Forever Family, and together they and mortal allies work in secret to fight evil and influence humanity for the better. Many of the Forever Family leave their old names behind, renaming themselves after weapons or items of significance. The three Eternal Warriors also earn individual titles among the Forever Family. Aram, also nicknamed "the Mighty Arm-Strong", becomes an Earth-based sorcerer known as a Geomancer. Gilad becomes known as Warmaster. Ivar, who discovers how to fold time and travel through the sub-dimension of "netherspace", earns the title Timewalker. Aram forges a strong friendship with a Forever Family warrior who takes the name "Archer". The two work as partners for a while until Archer dies in battle.

In the modern-day, the Eternal Warriors have a hidden community in the Palazzo base in Rome that includes the Forever Family, several human allies, and the Neo-Vals, the last surviving descendants of the original Vikings. While investigating a threat from within, the Forever Family discovers a young man named LeMont Quirrel, a petty criminal who finds himself wishing to help. Quirrel's manner and natural skill for weapons reminds Aram of his old friend Archer. This, along with the fact that Quirrel also wears a pendant decorated by arrows, leads Aram to instinctively call him "Archer". Resistant at first to fill the role of a person he never met, Quirrel later accepts the nickname gladly.

The Forever Family works together again against threats such as the corrupt organization Blackworks, whose leader Donald Kelvin discovers Mog. The father of the Eternal Warriors uses Blackworks resources to wage war, demanding leadership of the Forever Family and domination of Earth. To fight Mog, Ivar frees his imprisoned mother Nin. After several battles, Mog is defeated and the Eternal Warriors decide their efforts to help humanity have caused as much harm as good. They disband the Forever Family and go their separate ways.

=== Valiant Entertainment Relaunch (2012–present) ===
Millennia ago in the ancient Sumerian City-state of Ur, Aram Anni-Prada is celebrated along with his older brother Ivar the engineer and his younger brother, the ruthless Gilad. Aram's incredible strength earns him the nickname "Aram the Strong". While on a quest in a mysterious realm called the Faraway, the brothers discover a machine called the Boon that seems able to hold back death. They steal it, but Gilad is killed in the process. Driven desperate by grief, Ivar activates the Boon to restore Gilad, despite Aram trying to stop him. The Boon restores Gilad and makes him and the two other brothers immortal, but in doing so it drains the life force of all the citizens of Ur. The following explosion, the Great Cataclysm, destroys the surrounding area. Aram is grief-stricken by the loss of his people and by the knowledge that his immortality is due to the theft of thousands of lives.

Unknown to the brothers, their young sister Vexana is resurrected by dark spirits who grant her immortality and the power to warp emotions. Believing her survival means she might be responsible for the Great Cataclysm, Vexana becomes twisted by grief and blocks out some of her own memories. She stalks history as an "agent of chaos" provoking conflict and war, taking the name War-Monger. On occasion she fights her brothers, who do not recognize her as the child who was their sister.

The brothers go their separate ways, occasionally joining forces to fight evil. Gilad becomes known as the Eternal Warrior while Ivar becomes the Timewalker, also called "Forever Walker" by other time travelers. Though he aids them when he is needed, Aram prefers fun and drink to violence and dislikes Gilad's serious and ruthless nature. By the modern day, Aram the Strong is known simply as Armstrong.

A secret coalition of conspiracies and cults rises and works secretly in the shadows for centuries, calling itself simply the Sect. In the modern-day, two members of the Sect named Charles and Marcie Archer adopt several children and raise them in isolation, training them to be religiously devout assassins. One such child, Obadiah, has superhuman "psiot" potential. Believing he will be a valuable weapon, the Archers tell Obadiah that he is their biological son. When he is old enough, the teenage Obadiah is sent to assassinate "He Who Is Not To Be Named", whom he is told is a demon and Satan's envoy on Earth. Obadiah meets a bar bouncer named Armstrong and realizes this is the target. But after overhearing a conversation between his parents and a group of demon-worshipping businessmen called "The 1%", Obadiah realizes he has been lied to and is nothing more than a weapon to the Archers.

Joining forces, Archer and Armstrong go on a quest to stop the Sect from recovering the scattered pieces of the Boon and rebuilding the machine so their own members can become immortal. This brings them into conflict with Obadiah's adopted siblings, including his love Mary-Maria Archer. Along the way, Archer is guided by visions of Ivar, whom he first mistakenly believes is God or an agent of Heaven.

The Boon is repaired and activated, only for Charles and Marcie Archer to realize too late that the machine grants immortality by stealing life from those nearby. The children and other sect members are killed while the spirits of Charles and Marcie are trapped inside Mary-Maria as the machine is stopped by Archer and Armstrong. The day is saved but the current Geomancer sorcerer dies in the process, and Armstrong realizes that his brother Gilad will sense this and want vengeance.

Now alone in the world, Archer joins Armstrong as a full-time partner in adventure. The two fight and then join forces with Gilad and the new Geomancer against the Null, a cult that worships entropy and nothingness. This brings them into battle with a living algorithm created by the Null that regularly uses different humans as host bodies, "the Last Enemy" (a new version of the Valiant Comics villain "the Immortal Enemy"). After thwarting the Null, the two heroes wound up searching for classified files regarding Archer's true nature, leading them to Project Rising Spirit (the same government project that studied psiots and harbingers and created the Bloodshot super-soldiers).

Soon afterward, Mary-Maria joins Archer and Armstrong on a journey to the Faraway and they find themselves in the middle of a war. They are able to escape with Ivar's help. Meanwhile, a cell of disgruntled Sect henchmen called the Black Bloc foments discontent between all the Sect factions, culminating in a Sect Civil War. Finding a lost relic called the Wheel of Aten, Archer wins control of the Sect. Though he hopes this means he can turn the operation towards good, it also makes him a target for Bloodshot and the H.A.R.D. Corps. Later, the Wheel is broken apart and sent back in time to the Faraway. Its pieces are used to create the Boon.

== Powers and equipment ==
=== Archer ===
==== Valiant Comics (1992) incarnation ====
Obadiah Archer is a psiot, a superhuman by birth. He has the subconscious ability to adjust and adapt his body to a variety of situations. With this, he can imitate any fighting move or physical feat he sees and memorize any physical skill he is taught (provided these feats and actions don't require superhuman power levels). By adjusting his eyes for aim, he is an expert marksman and archer with any gun or bow-based weapon. He can also attain night vision when needed. Along with all this, Archer spent eight years in a monastery learning martial arts and how to hone his physical abilities.

The Acclaim Entertainment version of Archer is never seen, only mentioned. His name is then adopted by LeMont Quirrel, a natural fighter who is welcomed into the Forever Family.

==== Valiant Comics (2012) incarnation ====
With Valiant's relaunch in 2012, Archer was trained since childhood to be an assassin. Along with this training in martial arts and weaponry, Archer is a psiot with an ability compared to "morphogenesis". This allows him to consciously or subconsciously tap into the akashic plane where the sum total of human ancestral memory exists, giving him access to a variety of human skills, abilities, and traits. Archer can also duplicate certain superhuman powers in this way.

=== Armstrong ===
Like his brothers Gilad and Ivar, Aram the Strong is ageless and heals from injury, making him nearly invincible. While his two brothers have enhanced strength, Armstrong is the strongest of the three. His long life has made him an expert in many forms of combat and weaponry, though he often prefers to use brute strength in a fight rather than skill.

In the Acclaim Entertainment Comics continuity, immortals could still be killed by catastrophic injury, such as having most of their flesh and muscle destroyed, having their heads destroyed, or being bisected across the mid-section.

Since 2012, the comics have said that mysterious machine known as the Boon not only enhanced the bodies of Armstrong and his brothers when they became immortal but also their minds. The three brothers now have minds with unlimited storage and analytical capacity, as well as perfect recall when necessary. Even if the brain is destroyed and must later regenerate, all memories and knowledge are retained. The Boon also equips the mind with a unique form of apathy, so that emotions do not play a prominent role in their thought processes (although they do still feel them). This makes them immune to depression and other forms of mental illness, allowing them to experience eternity without losing their sanity over time.

In his different incarnations, Armstrong also carries a magical bottomless satchel containing a variety of artifacts accumulated throughout history, including many weapons and some magical items. The satchel never increases in weight and seems invulnerable to damage or wear. Armstrong claims to have the Holy Grail itself as well. In the original Valiant Comics stories, the satchel could also compel others to obey a person holding it.

== Awards and recognition ==
- Archer & Armstrong: First Impressions was named among The Ten Best Collected Editions of 2008 by Diamond Comics Distributors.
- Best Comics of 2012 by Crave Online
- Top 20 Comics of 2012 by Geeks Unleashed
- Best Comics of 2012 by Bloody Disgusting
- Top 100 Comics in 2013 by Comic Book Resources
- Best Comics of 2013 by Gray Haven Comics
- Issue of the Year (2013) – Archer & Armstrong #15 by StashMyComics.com

=== Nominations ===
- Archer & Armstrong was nominated for the 2012 IGN People's Choice Award for Best New Comic Series.
- 2014 Harvey Award Nominations:
  - Most Promising New Talent: Pere Perez, Archer & Armstrong, Harbinger Wars, Valiant Entertainment
  - Best Continuing or Limited Series: Archer & Armstrong, Valiant Entertainment
  - Special Award for Humor in Comics: Fred Van Lente, Archer & Armstrong, Valiant Entertainment

== Collected editions ==
The original 1992 series was first collected in 2008 as a deluxe hardcover and in 2016 as a complete omnibus of the run, and as a trade paperback in 2024 under the Valiant Classic Collection banner:

- Archer & Armstrong: First Impressions (collects Archer & Armstrong #0–6 plus new story The Formation of the Sect). September 2008, Valiant Entertainment, ISBN 978-0-9796409-2-6
- Archer and Armstrong: The Complete Classic Omnibus (collects Archer & Armstrong #0–26, Eternal Warrior (1992–1996) #25, Chaos Effect: Omega (1994), and the story The Formation of the Sect). January 2016, Valiant Entertainment, ISBN 978-1-9393468-7-2
- Archer and Armstrong: Revival (Valiant Classic Collection; collects Archer & Armstrong (1992) #0–12). January 2024, Alien Books, ISBN 978-1962201049

This hardcover of the Archer & Armstrong origin story was digitally recolored and "remastered" from the original material. In addition to collecting the first 7 issues, it also includes a new Formation of the Sect story by Jim Shooter, one of the title's original creators. Archer & Armstrong: First Impressions was later named one of the top ten graphic novels of 2008 by Diamond Comic Distributors (Valiant Entertainment's second showing on the coveted top ten, along with Harbinger: The Beginning) and one of the best of 2008 by Ain't It Cool News.

The 2012 relaunched series has been collected into a series of trade paperbacks:

- Archer & Armstrong Vol. 1: The Michelangelo Code (collects Archer & Armstrong #1–4)
- Archer & Armstrong Vol. 2: Wrath of the Eternal Warrior (collects Archer & Armstrong #5–9)
- Archer & Armstrong Vol. 3: Far Faraway (collects Archer & Armstrong #10–13, 0)
- Archer & Armstrong Vol. 4: Sect Civil War (collects Archer & Armstrong #14–17)
- Archer & Armstrong Vol. 5: Mission: Improbable (collects Archer & Armstrong #18–19, 0 and Bloodshot and H.A.R.D Corps #20–21)
- Archer & Armstrong Vol. 6: American Wasteland (collects Archer & Armstrong #20–23)
- Archer & Armstrong Vol. 7: The One Percent and Other Tales (collections Archer & Armstrong #24–25, and Archer & Armstrong: The One Percent #1)

Additionally, the series has begun being collected into Deluxe Edition hardcovers:

- Archer & Armstrong: Deluxe Edition Vol. 1 (collects Archer & Armstrong #1–13, 0)

The 2016 limited series has been collected into three trade paperbacks:

- A&A: The Adventures of Archer & Armstrong Vol. 1: In the Bag (collects A&A: The Adventures of Archer & Armstrong #1–4)
- A&A: The Adventures of Archer & Armstrong Vol. 2: Romance and Road Trips (collects A&A: The Adventures of Archer & Armstrong #5–8)
- A&A: The Adventures of Archer & Armstrong Vol. 3: Andromeda Estranged (collects A&A: The Adventures of Archer & Armstrong #9–12)

Additionally, the series has been collected into a Deluxe Edition hardcover:

- A&A: The Adventures Archer and Armstrong Deluxe Edition (collects A&A: The Adventures of Archer & Armstrong #1–12, Immortal Brothers: The Tale of the Green Knight #1, and Armstrong and the Vault of Spirits #1)

== In other media ==
=== Film adaptation ===
In March 2017, a feature film centered around the titular duo was announced. The project, which is said to be a buddy action comedy in tone, will be a joint-venture production between Valiant Entertainment and Sean Daniel Company. BenDavid Grabinski will serve as screenwriter, while Dinesh Shamdasani, Sean Daniel and Jason Brown are attached as producers. In March 2017, Ruben Fleischer signed onto the project as director, with Terry Rossio re-writing the script.

=== Web series ===
Archer and Armstrong are portrayed by Alex Meglei and Kevin Porter in the web series Ninjak vs. the Valiant Universe.

== See also ==
- Theosophy
- Ascended Masters
