= Shadowman (comics) =

- Artwork from Shadowman #1 (November 2012); Art by Patrick Zircher

Publication information
- Publisher: Valiant Comics
- First appearance: As Jack Boniface: X-O Manowar #4 (May 1992) As Shadowman: Shadowman #1 (May 1992)
- Created by: Jim Shooter; Steve Englehart; David Lapham

In-story information
- Alter ego: Jack Dominique Boniface
- Team affiliations: Secret Weapons
- Partnerships: Archer & Armstrong
- Notable aliases: Shadowman
- Abilities: When the Darque Power fills Jack Boniface, he has the following abilities: Reduced fear; Seeing in darkness; Regeneration; Gliding; Enhanced strength; Enhanced endurance; Enhanced reflexes; Other voodoo powers

Shadowman is a fictional superhero who appears in comic books published by Valiant Comics. The character debuted in Shadowman #1 (May 1992), created by writers Jim Shooter and Steve Englehart, and artist David Lapham. Shadowman appears in his own series and video games, as well as numerous other Valiant comics.

Shadowman is a lineage and four characters have taken up the mantle thus far in the comics and video games. The series protagonist is Jack Boniface.

Since his introduction, Shadowman has been a key character in the Valiant Universe and has sold over 5.3 million copies to date, with 80 issues published. Shadowman comics have been translated into a number of languages, including German, Italian, Spanish, Norwegian, Filipino and Chinese, among others. New Orleans mayor Sidney Barthelemy officially proclaimed January 17, 1993 as “Shadowman Day.”

== Publication history ==
=== Original Valiant continuity ===
Shadowman debuted in 1992 as a flagship title in the Valiant Universe. After one year in publication, Shadowman was selling over 100,000 comics books a month. Shadowman would go on to guest star in a number of Valiant comics, fighting alongside other heroes in the Valiant Universe, most notably "Unity" and "Unity 2000".

=== Acclaim continuity ===
Shadowman eventually sold more than 5 million copies in total before Acclaim Entertainment bought Valiant for $65 million in 1994. Acclaim Comics subsequently started a new Shadowman series in 1996. Acclaim also published Shadowman video games. In preparation for the leap to video games a new action-oriented Shadowman took up the mask in comics. The second series of comics (spelled Shadow Man) featured the iteration of Shadowman that would gain huge popularity in the successful Shadow Man video game franchise. In a similar manner to the original iteration, the hero fought alongside other characters in the Acclaim Comics Universe, notably Unity 2000.

People who have worked on Shadowman characters and storylines include Marvel Comics Editor-in Chief Joe Quesada, former Marvel Comics Editor-in-Chief Jim Shooter, Frank Miller, Garth Ennis, Rob Liefeld, Barry Windsor-Smith, Jamie Delano, Steve Ditko, David Lapham, Rags Morales, Fabian Nicieza, Jim Starlin, Bob Layton, Jimmy Palmiotti, Walt Simonson and Ashley Wood. With issue seven Bob Hall took over writing chores and continued as the primary writer on the book until the first "Shadowman" run ended with issue 43.

Acclaim shut down all comic book publishing in 2002, in anticipation of a bankruptcy filing of its parent company after suffering heavy losses from its licensed sports video games. Shadowman and all other Valiant properties were sold to Valiant Entertainment.

== Powers and abilities ==
=== Valiant Comics ===
As Shadowman, Jack possesses paranormal strength, endurance, agility, and reflexes, night vision, regenerative healing, gliding capabilities, depleted fear, and other voodoo powers.

=== Valiant Entertainment ===
Shadowman's abilities include necromancy, traversing the afterlife, shadow and darkness manipulation as well as control of the deadside and it's denizens.

== In other media ==
=== Film ===
In 1999, Acclaim Entertainment was approached by rapper/actor Ice Cube with a pitch to make a feature film. Acclaim declined this offer, as they were focused on the success of the video game franchise. In June 2017, it was reported that Valiant Entertainment had hired Reginald Hudlin to direct a film adaptation, and also co-write the screenplay with Adam Simon.

=== Web series ===
Shadowman appears in the web series Ninjak vs. the Valiant Universe, portrayed by Damion Poitier.

=== Video games ===
In 1999, Shadow Man was released on the Nintendo 64, PlayStation, Dreamcast, and PC.

In 2002, its sequel, Shadow Man: 2econd Coming, was released in 2002 as a PlayStation 2 exclusive.

In all, the Shadow Man franchise has sold over 2 million copies and grossed close to 100 million dollars in revenue. Both games before 2023 focus on Michael LeRoi, the Acclaim Comics version of Shadow Man.

In May 2023, a new game, Shadowman: Darque Legacy that features Jack Boniface was announced that is slated for release in 2026.

=== Music ===
In 2015, heavy metal band A Sound of Thunder released a concept album entitled Tales from the Deadside based on Shadowman. The album was released on compact disc, vinyl, and digital formats. The album features original artwork by Bob Hall and Roberto de la Torre. A limited 7 inch vinyl picture disc for album tracks "Tower of Souls" and "Punk Mambo" was also released in 2015.

== Collected editions ==
Title	Material collected	Published date	ISBN
Valiant Comics
Shadowman	Shadowman (vol. 1) #1-3, 6	January 1994	
Valiant Masters: Shadowman Vol. 1: Spirits Within	Shadowman (vol. 1) #0-7	June 2013	978-1939346018
Shadowman Classic Omnibus	Shadowman (vol.1) #0-24, The Second Life of Doctor Mirage #5, Secret Weapons (vol. 1) #1–2, and Darque Passages #1	October 2021	978-1682153864
Acclaim Comics
Shadowman by Garth Ennis & Ashley Wood	Shadowman (vol. 2) #1–4, Shadowman: Deadside #1–3	July 2016	978-1682151358
Shadowman by Jamie Delano & Charlie Adlard	Shadowman (vol. 2) #5-15	May 2022	978-1682154229
Valiant Entertainment
Shadowman Vol. 1: Birth Rites	Shadowman (vol. 3) #1-4	May 2013	978-1939346001
Shadowman Vol. 2: Darque Reckoning	Shadowman (vol. 3) #5-9	October 2013	978-1939346056
Shadowman Vol. 3: Deadside Blues	Shadowman (vol. 3) #0, 10-12	January 2014	978-1939346278
Shadowman Vol. 4: Fear, Blood and Shadows	Shadowman (vol. 3) #13-16	May 2014	978-1939346278
Shadowman: End Times	Shadowman: End Times #1-3	September 2014	978-1939346377
Shadowman Deluxe Edition Book 1	Shadowman (vol. 3) #0-10	November 2014	978-1939346438
Shadowman Deluxe Edition Book 2	Shadowman (vol. 3) #11-16, Shadowman: End Times #1-3, Punk Mambo #0	September 2017	978-1682151075
Shadowman Vol. 1: Fear of the Dark	Shadowman (vol. 5) #1-3	July 2018	978-1682152393
Shadowman Vol. 2: Dead and Gone	Shadowman (vol. 5) #4-7	November 2018	978-1682152874
Shadowman Vol. 3: Rag and Bone	Shadowman (vol. 5) #8-11	March 2019	978-1682153147
Shadowman by Andy Diggle Deluxe Edition	Shadowman (vol. 5) #1-11, Shadowman/Rae Sremmurd #1	May 2021	978-1682153727
Shadowman Book One	Shadowman (vol. 6) #1-4	November 2021	978-1682153741
Shadowman Book Two	Shadowman (vol. 6) #5-8	August 2022	978-1682154267
