= List of superhero teams and groups =

The Justice League of America, one of the most famous superhero teams, as they appear in JLA, Secret Origins. Art by Alex Ross.

The following is a partial list of teams of superheroes from various comic books, television shows, and other sources.

== DC Comics ==
- All-Star Squadron
- Atomic Knights
- Batman incorporated
- Birds of Prey
- Black Marvel Family
- Blue Lantern Corps
- Challengers of the Unknown
- New Challengers
- Champions of Angor
- Darkstars
- Doom Patrol
- The Elite
- Extreme Justice
- Forever People
- Freedom Fighters
- Global Guardians
- Golden Guardians
- Green Lantern Corps
- The Immortal Men
- Indigo Tribe
- Inferior Five
- Infinity Inc.
- Justice League of America
  - Justice League Antarctica
  - Justice League Detroit
  - Justice League Elite
  - Justice League Europe
  - Justice League International
  - Justice League Task Force
- Justice League Unlimited
- Justice Legion Alpha
- Justice Riders
- Justice Society of America
- Legion of Superheroes
  - Legion Espionage Squad
  - Legion of Substitute Heroes
  - Legion of Super-Pets
- Lieutenant Marvels
- The Marvel Family
- Metal Men
- Omega Men
- The Others
- The Outsiders
- Power Company
- Primal Force
- Red Hood and the Outlaws
- Secret Six
- Section 8
- Sentinels of Magic
- Seven Soldiers of Victory
- Shadowpact
- Sovereign Seven
- Squadron of Justice
- Stormwatch
- Suicide Squad
- Super Buddies
- Super Friends
- Teen Titans
- Teen Titans West
- Team 7
- The Terrifics
- Ultimen
- The Unexpected
- Violet Lantern Corps
- Young Justice
- Zoo Crew

=== America's Best Comics ===
- League of Extraordinary Gentlemen
- Top 10
- SMASH
- Strongmen of America

=== Impact ===
- American Crusaders
- Crusaders
- The Web

=== Milestone Media ===
- Blood Syndicate
- Heroes
- Shadow Cabinet

=== WildStorm ===
- The Authority
- The Boys
- Gen^{13}
- Liberty Squad
- Planetary
- Paladins
- Savant Garde
- Stormwatch
- Team 7
- Team One
- Wildcore
- WildC.A.T.S.
- Wildsiderz

== Marvel Comics ==
- A-Force
- A-Team
- All-Winners Squad
- Alpha Flight
- Annihilators
- Avengers
- Avengers A.I
- Avengers of the Supernatural
- Avengers Unity Division
- Big Hero 6
- Captain America Corps
- Champions (1975 team)
- Champions (2016 team)
- The Chosen
- Cosmic Avengers
- Deadpool Corps
- Defenders
- Earth Force
- Excalibur
- Exiles (Marvel Comics)
- Fallen Angels
- Fantastic Five
- Fantastic Force
- Fantastic Four
- Fearless Defenders
- Force Works
- Generation X
- Genext
- God Squad
- Great Lakes Avengers
- Guardians of the Galaxy (1969 team)
- Guardians of the Galaxy (2008 team)
- The Hand
- Heroes for Hire
- Inhumans
- Invaders
- Last Defenders
- League of Losers
- Legion of Monsters
- Marvel Knights
- New Avengers
- New Mutants
- New Warriors
- New X-Men (2001 series)
- New X-Men (2004 series)
- Next Avengers
- Nextwave
- Nick Fury's Howling Commandos
- Nova Corps
- Omega Flight
- Outlaws
- Phoenix Five
- Power Pack
- Runaways
- S.H.I.E.L.D.
- Savage Avengers
- Secret Avengers
- Secret Defenders
- Secret Warriors
- Shi'ar Imperial Guard
- Slingers
- Sorcerers Supreme
- Squadron Supreme
- Thor Corps
- Thunderbolts
- U.S. Avengers
- Ultimate Knights
- Ultimate X-Men
- Ultimates
- Uncanny X-Men
- Web Warriors
- West Coast Avengers
- West Coast Ultimates
- X-Babies
- X-Ceptionals
- X-Club
- X-Corporation
- X-Corps
- X-Factor
- X-Factor Investigations
- X-Force
- X-Men
- X-Men 2099
- X-Nation 2099
- X-Patriots
- X-People
- X-Punks
- X-Saviours
- X-Statix
- X-Terminated
- X-Terminators
- X-Ternals
- Young Allies
- Young Avengers
- Young X-Men

=== Ultraverse ===
- Exiles
- Freex
- The Strangers
- Ultraforce

=== Malibu Comics ===
- Protectors

=== New Universe ===
- DP 7
- Kickers, Inc.
- Psi-Force
- Spitfire and the Troubleshooters

=== Epic Comics ===
- Strikeforce: Morituri

=== Razorline ===
- Hyperkind

=== King in Black ===
- The Union

== Image Comics ==
- Actioneers
- Capes, Inc
- Deadly Duo
- Dynamo 5
- Fighting Force
- Firebirds
- Freak Force
- Global Defense Agency
- Guardians of the Globe
- Liberty League
- The League of Honor
- Omega One
- The Nobles
- The Pact
- Special Operations Strikeforce
- Teen Team
- Ultra Mega Super Five
- Underground Freaks
- Wildguard
- Wolf C.O.R.P.S.

=== Top Cow ===
- Cyber Force
- Codename: Strykeforce
- Liberty Balance

=== Awesome Comics ===
- Allied Supermen of America
- Bloodpool
- Bloodstrike
- Brigade
- League of Infinity
- New Men
- New Force
- Operation: Knightstrike
- Youngblood

=== Big Bang Comics ===
- Knights of Justice
- Pantheon of Heroes
- Round table of America
- Verdict
- Whiz Kids

== Dark Horse Comics ==
- Bureau for Paranormal Research and Defense
- The End League
- Hellboy
- Umbrella Academy

=== Comics' Greatest World ===
- Catalyst

=== Legend ===
- Next Men

== Valiant Comics ==
- Archer and Armstrong
- Armorines
- Harbingers
- H.A.R.D. Corps
- Quantum & Woody
- Psi Lords
- Punx
- Rai and the Future Force
- Secret Weapons
- Trinity Angels
- Trouble Makers
- Unity

== Boom! Studios ==
- The Hypernaturals
- Paradigm
- Planetary Brigade

== Other independent ==
- The Atomics
- The DNAgents
- Digvbc
- Elementals
- Femforce
- Freedom Force
- Frenetic Five
- Hero Alliance
- The Honor Guard and the First Family of Astro City
- The Incarnations
- Justice Machine
- Mighty Crusaders
- Mighty Mutanimals
- Sign Gene: The First Deaf Superheroes
- SuperFuckers
- The New Wave (comics)
- Team Superpowers of Project Superpowers
- Terrific Three
- T.H.U.N.D.E.R. Agents
- WorldWatch

== Hanna-Barbera / Cartoon Network ==
- Crystal Gems
- Galaxy Trio
- The Impossibles
- The Justice Friends
- The Powerpuff Girls
- Super Friends (Hanna-Barbera's version of the JLA)
- The Super Globetrotters
- Teen Force
- Underfist

== Anime / manga ==
- Cyborg 009
- Experts of Justice
- Galaxy Angel
- Gatchaman
- Gatchaman Crowds
- Hero Association
- Knight Sabers
- Libra
- Pretty Cure
- Magic Knight Rayearth
- Ronin Warriors
- Sailor Guardians
- Tokyo Mew Mew
- Yatterman

== TV ==
=== A ===
- Alphas
- Alpha Flight
- Agents of S.H.I.E.L.D.
- Aqua Teen Hunger Force
- The Aquabats (The Aquabats! Super Show!)
- The Avengers

=== B ===
- Ben 10
- The Beetleborgs
- Biker Mice from Mars
- Black Scorpion
- Bionic Six
- Birds of Prey
- Blue Falcon's Team

=== C ===
- Captain Caveman & the Teen Angels
- Captain Planet and the Planeteers
- The Centurions
- Challenge of the Superfriends
- Chouseishin
- Code Lyoko

=== D ===
- Danger Force
- Defenders of the Earth
- Doom Patrol

=== E ===
- Electra Woman and Dyna Girl
- Extreme Dinosaurs

=== G ===
- The Galaxy Rangers
- Girls x heroine

=== H ===
- Heroes

=== J ===
- Justice League
- Justice League Action
- Justice League: Gods and Monsters Chronicles
- Justice League Unlimited

=== K ===
- Kamen Rider

=== L ===
- Legends of Tomorrow
- The Loonatics

=== M ===
- Mane Six
- Manhattan Clan (Gargoyles)
- Men in Black
- Mermaid Man and Barnacle Boy (SpongeBob SquarePants)
- Metal Heroes
- Megamind
- The Mighty Heroes
- Misfits
- Misfits of Science
- Miraculous Ladybug
- The Miniforce
- Mutant X

=== N ===
- The N Team
- The New Justice Team
- Ninja captor

=== P ===
- The Powerpuff Girls
- The PJ Masks

=== R ===
- Road Rovers

=== S ===
- Samurai Pizza Cats
- SilverHawks
- Spectral Knights
- Spider-Friends
- Street Sharks
- The Super 4
- The Super 6
- Super Friends
- The Super Powers Team: Galactic Guardians
- Super Sentai
- Superhuman Samurai Syber-Squad
- Super Why

=== T ===
- Team Avatar
- Team Umizoomi
- Teamo Supremo
- Team Venture
- Teen Titans
- The Thundermans
- TigerSharks
- Titans
- Toxic Crusaders

=== U ===
- Ultraman
- Ultraforce

=== V ===
- VR Troopers
- Voicelugger
- Voltron

=== W ===
- Wild C.A.T.s
- Wolverine and the X-Men
- The World's Greatest Super Friends
- Wonder Woman
- Winx Club

=== X ===
- X-Men

=== Y ===
- Young Justice

== Film ==
- Big Hero 6
- Ghostbusters
- The Heroics
- The Incredibles
- Mystery Men
- Sign Gene
- Sky High
- The Specials
- The Super Capers
- Sharkboy and Lavagirl
- Team Zenith

== Other ==
- Battletoads
- Lego Super Heroes
- Overwatch
- Skylanders
- Super Robot Monkey Team Hyperforce Go!
- Space Squad
- Team RWBY
- The Wonderful 101
- Wind Warriors
- Z-Team
