= Livewire (Valiant Comics) =

Publication information
- Publisher: Valiant Comics
- First appearance: Harbinger #15 (March 1993)
- Created by: Bob Layton; Joe St. Pierre

In-story information
- Alter ego: Amanda Mckee
- Team affiliations: Unity; Secret Weapons
- Partnerships: Eternal Warrior; Ninjak; Stronghold; X-O Manowar
- Abilities: Ability to interface with and control electrical machines; Limited energy projection; Advanced knowledge of martial arts technique

Livewire is a fictional superhero that appears in comic books published by Valiant Comics. Created by Bob Layton and Joe St. Pierre. Livewire first appeared in Harbinger #15 (March 1993). She later played a major role in the Secret Weapons (1993) series.

In the relaunched Valiant Universe, Livewire first appears in Harbinger's first arc. Livewire has been featured in Unity as a founding member since 2013.

== Fictional character biography (Valiant Entertainment) ==
=== Harbinger Foundation ===
A psionic teletechnopath, able to control machines with force of will alone, Amanda McKee was orphaned at a young age, and sent to live in a group home. It was there that billionaire visionary and founder of the Harbinger Foundation, Toyo Harada, discovered her and took her into his care, rescuing her from the abusive environments of her early life. For this Amanda became unfailingly devoted to Harada and his mission. Assuming the name Livewire, Amanda became a star pupil of the Harbinger Foundation, eventually becoming one of Harada's most trusted aides.

All that changed, however, when Peter Stanchek joined the Harbinger Foundation. Faced with a power that nearly equaled his own, Harada's facade of control began to fray and his domineering tendencies became clearer and clearer to Livewire. Still faithful to Harada's vision, but believing that Peter could help balance his immense power, Livewire aided Harada's wayward student in his escape from the Harbinger Foundation and sent herself into exile following her betrayal.

=== Unity ===
Months later, when Aric of Dacia returned from space as the leader of a freed legion of Vine slaves and claimed Romania as the homeland of his new people, Harada reactivated Livewire and asked her to join his elite strike team, Unity. Utilizing her power to control machines, Livewire was able to strip the X-O Manowar armor from Aric and don it herself - with the intent of handing it over to Harada in turn. With the most powerful weapon in the universe at her command, Livewire easily subdued Aric's people and quickly defused a nuclear strike by rival nations bent on annihilating X-O Manowar.

Bonding with the armor, however, unlocked the full potential of Livewire's abilities, giving her full access to the records of the Harbinger Foundation. With all of Harada's darkest secrets now exposed to her, Livewire at last realized the true extent of his evil and quickly marshaled the Unity team against her former mentor.

Now fully expelled from the Harbinger empire, Livewire joined Ninjak in the service of England's MI-6, and traveled to Taiwan to investigate strange happenings related to the mysterious Dr. Silk...

== Fictional character biography (Valiant Comics) ==
The original incarnation of Amanda McKee is a Harbinger training at the Harbinger Foundation with her boyfriend, Edward T. Sedgewick. After abandoning the foundation, the two are forced to live on the run in hiding from Toyo Harada. This causes immense strain on their relationship, causing them to separate but remain close friends.

Geomancer Geoff McHenry eventually recruits Amanda and Edward to join his Secret Weapons team. Their time on the team is short lived, as they are deemed to volatile to be among the public, and are surrendered back into the Harbinger Foundation.

Once again under control of the foundation, Amanda undergoes a lobotomy that alters her being, turning her into a devout warrior that joins Toyo Harada and helps him fulfill his dream of a new world order. The operation also causes Amanda to lose her memory of her relationship with Edward.

== In other media ==
=== Web series ===
Livewire appears in the web series Ninjak vs. the Valiant Universe portrayed by Ciera Foster.
