= Fallz =

Miami pop band

Fallz was a 2000s Miami-based pop band. Their music was featured on MTV’s Power Girls reality series, Tekademics’ Mischief Invasion and Mischief Dynasty CD soundtracks, and Superverse's Zoom Suit comic promotions. In addition, Fallz licensed music to Volkswagen and Digital Studios Group and provided music for many interactive media companies.

== Notable events ==
Fallz performed at the Florida Grammy Showcase 2006, having been chosen by The Florida chapter of the Recording Academy of America as one of the six top bands from Florida or Puerto Rico. They were finalists in the All Access Music Awards (UK), Buzz Bake Sale Battle of the Bands, and South Florida Battle of the Bands. They were featured on the cover of The New Times (Broward edition) in September 2006. In 2009, the Fallz song "Savior" was featured backing the Animal Planet series Jockeys, in the episode, "Split Decision".

== Band members ==
The band was fronted by their vocalist "Marisa" (Aya Gruber), who wrote the music and lyrics. She also played guitar and keyboards. She had previously worked with Raymond Herrera (Fear Factory) and Jeremy Blair (engineer – Guns N' Roses).

Brett Fisher played bass, guitar and did programming and songwriting. He had previously worked with numerous musicians and bands including John Bechdel (Ministry, Killing Joke, Prong, False Icons, and Fear Factory), Tony Costanza (Machine Head, Crisis, Crobar), and Norman Scott (Gruntruck).

The drummer was Brandon Cruz, a classical percussionist who had performed with the New World Symphony Orchestra, and the Miami Symphony Orchestra. Brandon was the recipient of the "Allan Dawson Memorial Scholarship" presented by the Boston Jazz Society. He has a bachelor's degree in Classical Performance from Florida International University and earned his master's degree in Jazz Studies from the New England Conservatory of Music.
