= Armorines =

Fictional superhero team

Group publication information
- Publisher: Valiant Comics
- First appearance: X-O Manowar #24 (January 1994)
- Created by: Jorge Gonzalez; Jim Calafiore

In-story information
- Member(s): Gunny Lewis; Staff Sergeant Sirot; James Earl Williams; Grissom; Antonio Cordova

Armorines
- Creator(s): Jorge Gonzalez; Jim Calafiore

Armorines is a fictional superhero team from Valiant Comics about armored marines who, in the name of freedom, do the United States government's dirty work. The Armorines armor first appeared on the last page X-O Manowar #24 (January 1994), but the entire Armorines fully appeared in Armorines #0 (February 1994) which is a special comic insert in X-O Manowar #25 (February 1994).

== Fictional team biography ==
The U.S. Government took X-O Manowar as a threat. The Armorines were created by Dr. Phillip Zahn to deal with this threat. After they got the go ahead on the project from Senator Ackerman, Colonel Gardner recruited eight soldiers to function as the Armorines. Four would be trained as the field agents with the other four acting as their co-pilots from the base. Gunny Lewis, an aging war veteran, was chosen to be their field leader. Ackerman, however, made it perfectly clear to Gardner that he wanted Lewis out of the program as soon as the others were properly trained to function without him.

Initially a truce between X-O and the Government was formed, but this irritated CIA agent Peter Garrett and his associate, Ms. Mandrake of the IRS. The two forged orders from the Government which ordered the Armorines to take out X-O and sent them to Gardner. The Armorines attacked X-O and may have even defeated him, but their attack was called off by orders from General Kendall. Colonel Gardner was arrested for ordering the attack, and Kendall took his place as head of the Armorines. Meanwhile, the Armorine Sirot, who is also an agent of the National Security Agency, met with Garrett and forged a truce of sorts.

The Armorines went on to face other threats, but their biggest adversaries were the Spider Aliens. They first faced them underwater, and then in a huge battle in space. They were teamed with X-O Manowar and the H.A.R.D. Corps in the space battle. While they were in space fighting the aliens, the Chaos Effect broke out on Earth cutting off all communication with the military. Eventually the Chaos ended, the Spider Aliens were defeated, and the Armorines returned home.

The Armorines received medals of honor from the President himself upon their return. At the same time, however, Senator Ackerman ordered Gunny out of the Armorines program. When the President found out about this, he wrote a presidential order that took away Ackerman's control over the program and ensured that Gunny would remain in the Armorines. This didn't sit too well with Ackerman, so with Peter Garrett's help, he devised a plan to get Gunny out of the program anyway. The two rigged a hidden camera on Sirot's armor and shot footage of the destruction of a building on one of the Armorine's missions. Ackerman used this footage as a way to frame Gunny. If Gunny didn't leave the program, the footage would be used to ruin his career. He chose to leave. Sergeant William Sturgess was sent as his replacement.

== Creative teams ==
The following is a list of those who contributed to the creation of the series. When repeated, only last names will be used.

- 0: Jorge Gonzalez, writer / Jim Calafiore, pencils & cover / Gonzalo Mayo, inks.
- 1: Gonzalez, writer / Calafiore, pencils & cover / Rodney Ramos & Phyllis Novin, inks.
- 2: Gonzalez, writer / Calafiore, pencils & cover / Ramos, inks.
- 3-4: Gonzalez, writer / Calafiore, pencils & cover / Ramos & Novin, inks.
- 5: Gonzalez, writer / Calafiore, pencils/Ramos, inks / Calafiore & Bob Layton, cover.
- 6: Gonzalez, writer / Calafiore, pencils & cover / Ramos, inks.
- 7: Gonzalez, writer / Calafiore, pencils & cover / Ramos & Novin, inks.
- 8: Rob Johnson, writer / José Delbo, pencils / John Dixon, inks / Calfiore, cover.
- 9: Gonzalez, writer / Calafiore, pencils & cover / Anibal Rodriguez, inks.
- 10: Gonzalez, writer / Delbo, pencils / Rodriguez, inks / Calafiore, cover.
- 11-12: Gonzalez, writer / Delbo, pencils / Steve Montano, inks / Calafiore, cover.

== In other media ==
=== Video games ===
Armorines: Project S.W.A.R.M. was produced for Nintendo 64, PlayStation and Game Boy Color, based on the comic book.
