= Bloodshot (comics) =

Superhero from Valiant Comics

- Textless cover of Bloodshot #1 (July 2012). Art by Arturo Lozzi.

Publication information
- Publisher: Valiant Comics
- First appearance: Cameo appearance: Eternal Warrior #4 (November 1992); Full appearance: Rai #0 (November 1992)
- Created by: Kevin VanHook; Don Perlin; Bob Layton

In-story information
- Alter ego: Angelo Mortalli (original); Raymond Garrison (reboot)
- Team affiliations: Unity; H.A.R.D. Corps
- Notable aliases: Michael Lazarus; Mr. Blood Moon; Every Man; Harbinger Hunter; Psiot Killer; Angelo Mortalli (after reboot)
- Abilities: Superhuman strength, speed, agility, stamina, and reflexes; Regeneration; Master hand-to-hand combatant; Skilled marksman; Limited Shapeshifting; Technopathy; Camouflage; Formerly: H.A.R.D. Corps implants

Bloodshot is a superhero created in 1992 by Kevin VanHook, Don Perlin, and Bob Layton, appearing in comic books published by the American publisher Valiant Comics. The Bloodshot character has had different origins and incarnations, but he is consistently a character empowered by experimental nanites (microscopic machines) injected into his bloodstream, a procedure that leaves a red circular scar on his chest, hence the name. This gives Bloodshot enhanced physical traits, the ability to repair damage to his body, an internal database of weapons and hand-to-hand combat training, and a mental connection to computers (technopathy). A side effect of the use of his powers is that his skin becomes chalk-white and his eyes become red. Other powers vary with each incarnation.

The original Valiant Comics character was a mafia hitman named Angelo Mortalli who is experimented on by Project Rising Spirit. After Acclaim Entertainment bought Valiant Comics, writer Len Kaminski with artist Sal Velluto rebooted the character in 1997, now depicting him as a covert operative named Raymond Garrison who uses the cover identity of Angelo Mortalli while infiltrating the mafia. Garrison dies and is then resurrected and empowered by nanites, though this leaves him with amnesia. After Valiant Entertainment bought the character rights in 2004, Bloodshot was rebooted again in 2012 under the direction of Duane Swierczynski, Arturo Lozzi and Manuel Garcia. This version of the character remains in publication. The current Bloodshot (nicknamed Every Man) is a man who dies in battle and is then resurrected by nanites, making him the latest in a long line of resurrected super-soldiers the Project Rising Spirit (PRS) has been creating since World War II. Believing himself to be military officer named Raymond "Ray" Garrison, Bloodshot regularly goes on covert missions and is specially trained to fight people born with superhuman powers (known as "psiots" or "harbingers" in the Valiant Universe). He learns his superiors have regularly manipulated him by altering his memories, some of which are the recovered memories of dead soldiers, including two named Raymond Garrison and Angelo Mortalli. No longer sure if he was ever Ray Garrison and not wishing to be a living weapon, Bloodshot goes rogue, hoping to find his own life outside of PRS and the military.

== Publication history ==
=== Original Valiant Comics version ===
Bloodshot was created by Kevin VanHook, Don Perlin, and Bob Layton during a wave of popularity for Valiant Comics. The character's name was suggested by artist David Chlystek. The character first appeared in three panels on the last page of Eternal Warrior #4 (November 1992), before making his first full appearance in Rai Zero. (November 1992) a week later. The character got enough fan interest to earn his own series Bloodshot (Volume 1) in 1993, initially written by VanHook with artwork by Don Perlin. The series lasted 52 issues, concluding in 1996 just as Acclaim Entertainment bought Valiant Comics.

=== Acclaim Comics version ===
In 1997, Acclaim Entertainment rebooted the Valiant Universe. The new series Bloodshot (vol. 2), written by Len Kaminski with art by Sal Velluto, introduced a slightly altered version of the character and lasted 16 issues, ending in 1998. When Acclaim went out of business in 2004, Valiant Comics was rebranded as Valiant Entertainment and bought the rights to Bloodshot.

=== Valiant Entertainment version ===
In 2012, Valiant Entertainment rebooted the Valiant Universe again with a new line of comics. Bloodshot (vol. 3) introduced a new take on the Bloodshot character, written by Duane Swierczynski with art by Arturo Lozzi and Manuel Garcia. The series lasted 27 issues, though it was temporarily rebranded as Bloodshot and H.A.R.D. Corps after Valiant's Harbinger Wars crossover in 2013, then regained its original title after the Armor Hunters crossover in 2014 (which included a miniseries titled Armor Hunters: Bloodshot).

In 2015, a new ongoing series titled Bloodshot Reborn began under the direction of Jeff Lemire and Mico Suayan, lasting 18 issues and concluding in 2016, and supplemented with a miniseries titled Bloodshot U.S.A. and the one-shot Bloodshot's Day Off. In 2017, the 12-issue series Bloodshot Salvation was done by Lemire and Suayan, along with Lewis LaRosa. From 2018 to 2019, Valiant published a prequel 8-issue series titled Bloodshot Rising Spirit written by Kevin Grevioux, Lonnie Nadler, and Zac Thompson, with art by Ken Lashley. A new series set in the present began afterward, simply titled Bloodshot (vol. 4), written by Tim Seeley and illustrated by Brett Booth.

== Plot summary ==
=== Original Valiant Comics Version (1992) ===
Bloodshot Volume 1

Angelo Mortalli is a ruthless and arrogant hitman climbing the mob ranks and about to marry the daughter of mobster Gino Canelli, head of one of New York City's major crime families. When it is discovered Mortalli is having an affair, Canelli takes revenge by framing him for murder. Mortalli offers evidence in exchange for federal witness protection rather than prison. But Canelli learns about this further betrayal and buys off an FBI agent to kidnap Mortalli. Rather than kill the former hitman, Canelli delivers him to be a new test subject for Project Rising Spirit, an illegal and clandestine attempt to turn people into living weapons, headed by the corrupt scientist Hideyoshi Iwatsu.

Mortalli's body is injected with microscopic technology called nanites, leaving a blood-red circle scar on his chest. The nanites rebuild his brain and body, making Angelo superhuman but erasing his memory in the process. When Angelo uses his superhuman abilities or his nanites detect combat situations, his skin becomes paler, often turning chalk-white, and his eyes turn red.

Cover image of Bloodshot #40. Art by Jeff Johnson.

Escaping from the lab, Mortalli takes the name "Bloodshot" and determines to learn who he was and how he was altered. While fighting and killing many members of the New York mob, Mortalli joins forces with the "Eternal Warrior" called Gilad. They had been enemies before but Abrams does not hold a grudge because he believes Mortalli metaphorically "died" the night Bloodshot was born. Mortalli is later disillusioned after learning about his past actions as a hitman. Having no desire to remain in New York or return to his old life, Bloodshot goes to Europe and uses his powers to fight corruption. He soon learns that his wife Mary was murdered by a powerful woman named Crago. He goes after Crago but before killing her Crago reveals that she is his wife. He kills her and with the help of Abrams, he creates a new cover identity for himself, "Michael Lazarus," and operates as Bloodshot when he deems it necessary. He battles a variety of villains and criminals, some of whom are "psiots" or "harbingers" (people born with superhuman powers). One of his enemies include Ax, a psiot obsessed with attaining advanced technology such as Bloodshot's nanites and the alien armor of X-O Manowar.

Readers learn that in the future, the heroic line of Rai warriors adopt a similar appearance to Bloodshot to remember his heroism in the 20th century. The 43rd Rai, as well as the 44th Rai, even inherits Mortalli's nanites.

=== Acclaim Entertainment Reboot (1997) ===
Bloodshot Volume 2

This incarnation of Bloodshot permanently has alabaster skin and red eyes, whether he actively uses his powers or not. Instead of a mobster who was captured and experimented on while alive, he is Raymond Garrison, a secret operative for the Domestic Operations Authority (D.O.A.). He is sent to infiltrate the Canelli crime family by using the cover identity "Angelo Mortalli." While living as Mortalli, Garrison begins a romantic relationship with Gina DeCarlo. When the mobsters realize "Angelo" is a traitor, they kill him. The D.O.A. brings his remains to its secret experiment known as Project Lazarus, where Dr. Stroheim resurrects him with nanites, turning him into a superhuman "angel of death."

Garrison suffers partial amnesia as a result of his resurrection, and initially believes that his real name was Angelo Mortalli. He investigates his past and the circumstances of his death and transformation, bringing into conflict with the mob and the D.O.A. To fight and retrieve Bloodshot, D.O.A. Director Simon Oreck sends out the Special Circumstances Division (nicknamed "the Chainsaw"), a team of mercenaries equipped with advanced technology. While eliminating evidence that could lead back to them and Project Lazarus, the D.O.A. kills Garrison's former lover Gina DeCarlo.

Bloodshot finally learns he was once D.O.A. operative Raymond Garrison. Dr. Stroheim reveals Garrison was his first true success and the process cannot be replicated unless a "prime assembler" unit implanted in Bloodshot is removed. Rather than allow others to be transformed into undead soldiers as he was, Bloodshot destroys Stroheim's lab and leaves.

=== Valiant Entertainment Reboot (2012) ===
==== Bloodshot (Volume 3) ====
Starting with the 2012 Valiant Entertainment relaunch, the Project Rising Spirit Program (PRS) is said to have regularly created different super-soldiers since the days of World War II. The Bloodshot super-soldiers, later collectively known as the "Bloodshot Squad," are distinguished by nicknames: Tank Man (Winston Grover) first served in World War II, described as an "animated Frankenstein"; the science greatly improved for Viet Man (Sergeant Dell Palmer), who served in the Vietnam War and was "fully repairable and adaptable to his environment"; Cold Man was an operative who could adopt a more human appearance and blend in, helping him act as a covert agent during the Cold War. At some point, there was also a dog test subject nicknamed Bloodhound. All of these subjects were near-mindless weapons with little restraint against causing civilian casualties. Starting with Quiet Man, who served in the Gulf War, the Bloodshot project uses nanites to transfer memories from dead soldiers, providing the super-soldier with emotional restraint as well as motivation factors that can be manipulated to ensure control.

One Bloodshot cyborg who has multiple false identities implanted over time eventually becomes insane, forcing the program to destroy him in 2010. The techniques and technology used on him are improved on for the next Bloodshot, who is nicknamed Every Man and serves in many Special Ops missions, including in Syria and Afghanistan. Bloodshot (Volume 3) follows the life of Every Man, who at the start of the series believes he is Raymond "Ray" Garrison, a soldier with a wife and son back home.

In 2007, Dr. Emmanuel Kuretich discovers P.R.S. Director Simon Oreck is using Bloodshot super-soldiers to capture "psiots" or "harbingers", rare people born with superhuman abilities (particularly children psiots). Alarmed, Kuretich leaves and joins Toyo Harada's Harbinger Foundation, secretly making plans to stop P.R.S. Years later, while on a routine mission in Afghanistan, the modern-day Bloodshot soldier is captured by the Harbinger Foundation. Intending to expose Project Rising Sun to the world, Kuretich forcibly extracts mental records of his missions. The process causes Bloodshot to realize he has repeatedly been given false memories of different lives and identities in order to motivate him and control him. He believed he was Ray Garrison but now sees conflicting memories of other families, lives, and names (such as "Angelo Mortalli").

After escaping from Kuretich, Bloodshot learns P.R.S. is willing to destroy him if necessary and evades them too, realizing all his memories may be lies. Bloodshot later finds a P.R.S. facility known as the Nursery, built to house captured psiot children. Freeing the captives, he confronts the Nursery's sadistic jailer Gamma as well as an "outdated" cyborg hit squad called Chainsaw. His actions at the Nursery help lead to the Harbinger Wars crossover. Several free psiots join together to oppose both the Harbinger Foundation and P.R.S., calling themselves the Renegades, including a hacker activist named @x (pronounced "Ax").

==== Bloodshot and H.A.R.D. Corps ====
When Bloodshot later meets Toyo Harada, his free will is overridden by the "Harada Protocol", a hidden Rising Spirit program compelling him to terminate the man. A vicious battle leaves Harada seriously wounded and Bloodshot with a depleted nanite count. Bloodshot becomes a prisoner of Harada's Harbinger Foundation. Harada subjects him to painful tests, hoping to learn more about his unique technology. Not wishing the Harbinger Foundation to uncover the secrets of their experiments, Project Rising Spirit sends out a superhuman combat team, the Harbinger Active Resistance Division Corps (known more simply as H.A.R.D. Corps). Despite losses, the team retrieves Bloodshot. In exchange for PRS restoring his health and nanites, Bloodshot accepts membership in the H.A.R.D. Corps and joins the team on various global missions, including retrieving a former Project Rising Spirit test subject codenamed Prodigal, and fighting the duo of Archer & Armstrong in the crossover story "Mission Improbable." During this time, Bloodshot (Volume 3) is temporarily retitled Bloodshot and H.A.R.D. Corps.

Bloodshot pretends to become a loyal soldier and H.A.R.D Corps member in order to regain his health, as well as access to the Project's resources. As a reward for his cooperation and sign of good faith, Project Rising Spirit gives Bloodshot a file that seems to reveal his true identity is indeed Raymond "Ray" Garrison (though this could be another false life created by PRS). Once Bloodshot is sure he can survive without their aid, he breaks free of PRS and H.A.R.D. Corps, determined to be his own person rather than anyone's weapon. The series resumes the title Bloodshot for its final issues, #24 and 25. Deciding to retire from violence, Bloodshot disappears.

==== Bloodshot Reborn ====
Published in 2015 with creators Jeff Lemire and Mico Suayan, this series ran for 19 regular issues and had an annual issue, as well as the Bloodshot USA 4-issue miniseries and the one-shot Bloodshot's Day Off. After having his nanites removed by Kay McHenry (Geomancer), Bloodshot tries to live a normal life as Ray Garrison. But when a number of shootings are carried out by men who look like Bloodshot, he investigates and returns to the life he left behind.

==== Bloodshot Salvation ====
Published in 2017 with creators Jeff Lemire, Mico Suayan and Lewis LaRosa, this series ran for 12 regular issues plus a number of event tie ins. Following directly after Bloodshot Reborn, Bloodshot must now protect his girlfriend Magic and their daughter from Magic's sadistic family.

==== Bloodshot Rising Spirit ====
An 8-issue prequel series launched in 2018 under the writing trio of Kevin Grevioux, Lonnie Nadler and Zac Thompson, with artist Ken Lashley. The story takes place in 2010, two years before the Every Man Bloodshot learns his memories have been tampered with, leading him to go rogue. The prequel series focuses on a cyborg Bloodshot super-soldier who is regularly given new memories and identities, including one named "Angelo Mortalli." The imperfect memory alteration process eventually drives him insane and he turns on his handlers, forcing Project Rising Spirit to destroy him. By studying him, PRS ensures that their next Bloodshot soldier (the one who believes himself to be Raymond Garrison) will not suffer the same side-effect of insanity. This cyborg has no official name and is often referred to by fans simply as "Bloodshot Rising Spirit." The cyborg is seen by many as an immediate "prototype" to the modern day Bloodshot.

==== Bloodshot (volume four) ====
In 2019, writer Tim Seeley and artist Brett Booth launched a new ongoing Bloodshot series, which ended in March 2021 after 13 issues.

==== Bloodshot Unleashed ====
In 2022, writer Deniz Camp and artist Jon Davis-Hunt launched a new series, Bloodshot Unleashed. This is the first mature readers title from Valiant Entertainment.

== Powers and abilities ==
=== Original Valiant Comics continuity ===
Angelo Mortalli is a living man injected with nanites that control his blood flow, oxygen, and adrenaline levels, and almost immediately rebuild damaged and torn muscle. This gives him augmented reflexes, strength, speed, senses, and advanced healing. The microscopic machines connect his mind to a pre-programmed database of martial arts styles, combat skills, and weapons information. When Mortalli has to heal from serious wounds, he needs to consume animal tissue and protein (such as raw meat) to replace the lost mass and flesh. Alternatively, he can hold such replacement tissue and protein against the wound that needs repair and let his body absorb it over time. When in a calm state, Angelo's default appearance is identical to how he appeared before his nanite injection. When he uses his superhuman abilities or when his nanites detect a combat situation, his skin becomes paler until it is chalk-white and his eyes turn red.

Unlike previous test subjects of the same science, Angelo develops technopathy, allowing him to read information from computers and certain other electronic equipment (he cannot read the information directly from a disc or CD by touching it but he can if he places it within any kind of electronic reader and touches it, regardless of encryption or password protection). When encountering assassins who are empowered by similar nanites, Mortalli's technopathy allows him to control their technology and kill them.

=== Acclaim Comics continuity ===
The Acclaim Entertainment reboot version of Bloodshot, named Raymond Garrison, possesses the same powers but has the appearance of chalk-white skin and red eyes at all times. He differs from the previous incarnation by the fact that he died and was resurrected by nanite technology to become Bloodshot.

=== Valiant Entertainment reboot ===
The modern-day Bloodshot, known as Every Man and Ray Garrison, is a soldier who died and then was resurrected when a billion nanites were shot into his bloodstream and rebuilt him. The latest in a long line of super-soldiers, his nanites are unique compared to others of the Bloodshot program. These nanites grant him an internal database, superhuman strength, and enhanced combat abilities (including a sonic scream), as well as the ability to mentally interface with technology and outside databases. He can deliver a "neuro-psychic pulse emission" if necessary. Bloodshot's normal appearance involves red eyes, near-chalk white skin, and scarring on his chest that resembles a red circle, but thanks to malleable anatomy and the ability to camouflage his coloring, he can perform a limited form of shape-shifting to blend in as an average looking person or replicate the appearance of a person he remembers. When he has to heal from serious wounds or use his camouflage and mass-shifting ability, he often has to consume animal tissue and protein (such as raw meat) to help the process and replace lost tissue and mass.

== Connection with other Valiant characters ==
=== Original Valiant continuity ===
Generally, the characters published by Valiant inhabit a shared universe/continuity. In the original canon from Valiant Comics, the Angelo Mortalli incarnation of Bloodshot is connected to the future-era hero Takao Konishi, the last Rai. In this continuity, the entire line of Rai warriors is created by Grandmother in the image of Bloodshot to honor his heroism. It is revealed that the 43rd and 44th Rais has Mortalli's nanite powered blood in their veins, granting them some of Bloodshot's memories and all of his powers. This connection to Rai does not exist in the Acclaim Entertainment reboot canon or in the 2012 relaunched Valiant Universe.

=== 2012 Valiant continuity ===
In continuity launched by Valiant Entertainment in 2012, Bloodshot was made not only to perform covert ops and assassinations but also to capture "psiots" or "harbingers", the primary form of superhumans in the current Valiant Universe. This has forced him into contact and conflict with various superhumans throughout the Valiant Universe, such as the Eternal Warrior and the H.A.R.D. Corps.

== Reception ==
Shortly before the debut of the Bloodshot series, the title character made two introductory appearances in popular titles Rai and Eternal Warrior. Bloodshot (vol. 1) #1 (February 1993) sold approximately one million copies. The original series was written by Kevin VanHook and drawn by Don Perlin. The premiere issue featured the first "Chromium" comic book cover.

Bloodshot (vol. 3) #1 (July 2012) was awarded "Best Comic" by Diamond Comic Distributors (the American comics industry's leading distributor) and "Best Innovation" for its chromium cover. Bloodshot was named one of the Top Ten Comic-Book Series of 2012 by Nerdage.

== In other media ==
=== Film ===
==== Bloodshot ====
Bloodshot, a film based on the character starring Vin Diesel, had a theatrical release in the United States on March 13, 2020, by Sony Pictures Releasing. It was intended to be the first installment in a series of films set within a Valiant Comics shared cinematic universe. A version of the Valiant character Ax (who was an enemy of Bloodshot in his original incarnation) appeared in the film, while Project Rising Sun was altered to be a company called Rising Spirit Tech. Directed by David S. F. Wilson (in his feature directorial debut) from a screenplay by Jeff Wadlow and Eric Heisserer and a story by Wadlow, the film also stars Eiza González, Sam Heughan, Toby Kebbell, and Guy Pearce.

==== Ninjak vs. the Valiant Universe ====
Bloodshot appears in Ninjak vs. the Valiant Universe, portrayed by Jason David Frank.

=== Video games ===
- A Bloodshot video game was in development between 1997 and 1998 at Iguana Entertainment UK for PlayStation and Microsoft Windows, but was cancelled by publisher Acclaim Entertainment due to late development issues.
- Bloodshot appears as a secret unlockable playable character in the Nintendo 64 and Dreamcast versions of Shadow Man.

== Collected editions ==
=== Volume 1 ===
Title	Material collected	Published date	ISBN
Valiant Masters: Bloodshot Volume 1 – Blood of the Machine	Bloodshot (vol. 1) #1-8	November 2012	978-0979640933
Bloodshot Classic Omnibus Volume 1	Bloodshot (vol. 1) #0-24, Rai #0, Rai Companion #1, Eternal Warrior #5, 14-16, Secret Weapons (vol. 1) #3, 9-10,13, H.A.R.D. Corps #5	October 2019	978-1939346964
Bloodshot: The Blood of Heroes (Valiant Classic Collection)	Bloodshot (1993) #0-7, Eternal Warrior (1992) #5, H.A.R.D. Corps (1992) #5, and Rai (1992) #0	May 2024	978-1962201056

=== Volume 3 ===
Title	Material collected	Published date	ISBN
Bloodshot Vol. 1: Setting the World on Fire	Bloodshot (vol. 3) #1-4	March 2013	978-0979640964
Bloodshot Vol. 2: The Rise and the Fall	Bloodshot (vol. 3) #5-9	July 2013	978-1939346032
Bloodshot Vol. 3: Harbinger Wars	Bloodshot (vol. 3) #10-13	October 2013	978-1939346124
Bloodshot Vol. 4: H.A.R.D. Corps	Bloodshot and H.A.R.D. Corps #14-17, Bloodshot (vol. 3) #0	January 2014	978-1939346193
Bloodshot Vol. 5: Get Some and Other Stories	Bloodshot and H.A.R.D. Corps #18-19, 22-23, Bloodshot and H.A.R.D. Corps: H.A.R.D. Corps #0	September 2014	978-1939346315
Archer & Armstrong Vol. 5: Mission: Improbable	Bloodshot and H.A.R.D Corps #20-21 and Archer & Armstrong: Archer #0, Archer & Armstrong #18-19	June 2014	978-1939346353
Bloodshot Vol. 6: The Glitch and Other Tales	Bloodshot (vol. 3) #24-25	June 2015	978-1939346711
Bloodshot Deluxe Edition Book 1	Bloodshot (vol. 3) #1-13	April 2014	978-1939346216
Bloodshot Deluxe Edition Book 2	Bloodshot and H.A.R.D. Corps #14-23, Bloodshot (vol. 3) #0, 24-25, Bloodshot and H.A.R.D. Corps: H.A.R.D. Corps #0, Archer & Armstrong #18-19	October 2015	978-1939346810

=== Reborn/Salvation ===
Title	Material collected	Published date	ISBN
Bloodshot Reborn Vol. 1: Colorado	Bloodshot Reborn #1–5	September 2015	978-1939346674
Bloodshot Reborn Vol. 2: The Hunt	Bloodshot Reborn #6-9	February 2016	978-1939346827
Bloodshot Reborn Vol. 3: The Analog Man	Bloodshot Reborn #10-13	July 2016	978-1682151334
Bloodshot Reborn Vol. 4: Bloodshot Island	Bloodshot Reborn #14-18, Annual #1	January 2017	978-1682151679
Bloodshot U.S.A.	Bloodshot U.S.A. #1-4	May 2017	978-1682151952
Bloodshot Reborn Deluxe Edition Book 1	Bloodshot Reborn #1–13	December 2016	978-1682151556
Bloodshot Reborn Deluxe Edition Book 2	Bloodshot Reborn #0, 14–18, Annual #1, Bloodshot U.S.A. #1-4, Book of Death: The Fall of Bloodshot #1, 4001 A.D.: Bloodshot #1, Bloodshot's Day Off #1	October 2017	978-1682152270
Bloodshot Salvation Vol. 1: The Book of Revenge	Bloodshot Salvation #1-5	March 2018	978-1682152553
Bloodshot Salvation Vol. 2: The Book of the Dead	Bloodshot Salvation #6-9	August 2018	978-1682152775
Bloodshot Salvation Volume 3: The Book of Revelations	Bloodshot Salvation #10-12	January 2019	978-1682152935
Bloodshot Salvation Deluxe Edition	Bloodshot Salvation #1-12	December 2019	978-1682153345

=== Volume 4 ===
Title	Material collected	Published date	ISBN
Bloodshot Book 1	Bloodshot (vol. 4) #1-3, material from Valiant FCBD Bloodshot 2019 Special	December 2019	978-1682153420
Bloodshot Book 2	Bloodshot (vol. 4) #4-6	March 2020	978-1682153505
Bloodshot Book 3	Bloodshot (vol. 4) #0, 7-9	January 2021	978-1682153666
Bloodshot Book 4	Bloodshot (vol. 4) #10-12, material from Valiant 2020 Year of the Heroes FCBD Special	June 2021	978-1682153765
Bloodshot by Tim Seeley Deluxe Edition	Bloodshot (vol. 4) #0-12, material from Valiant FCBD Bloodshot 2019 Special, Valiant 2020 Year of the Heroes FCBD Special	April 2022	978-1682154120

=== Miniseries and one shots ===
Title	Material collected	Published date	ISBN
Armor Hunters: Bloodshot	Armor Hunters: Bloodshot #1-3, material from Bloodshot (vol. 3) #0	January 2015	978-1939346469
Divinity III: Heroes of the Glorious Stalinverse	Divinity III: Komandar Bloodshot #1 and Divinity III: Aric, Son of the Revolution #1, Divinity III: Shadowman and the Battle of New Stalingrad #1, and Divinity III: Escape from Gulag 396 #1	June 2017	978-1682152072
Bloodshot Rising Spirit	Bloodshot Rising Spirit #1-8	March 2021	978-1682152997

== Foreign editions ==
=== Chinese editions ===
- Bloodshot (vol. 1) #0 was reprinted in 1994 as the first Chinese (Cantonese) Valiant Comics book in Hong Kong. The book was published as part of a collector's box of six Valiant Comics books.
- A limited number of promotional copies of Bloodshot #1 were distributed at a press conference in Beijing when Valiant Entertainment announced a new partnership with DMG Entertainment on March 9, 2015. The promotional issue was translated and printed in Chinese (Mandarin).
