= Metrostop Entertainment =

Metrostop Entertainment is a production company founded in 2002. The President and Executive Producer is Philip Spilker.

== Pre-Metrostop ==
Robert Keyghobad (born May 1, 1972) and Philip Spilker, co-founders of Metrostop Entertainment are producers who had, prior to 2002 been involved in developing such projects as HBO's Carnivàle, 20th Century Fox pilot Honey Vicarro, commercials for McDonald's, Budweiser, Kraft and Nintendo, music videos for artists including White Zombie and Meredith Brooks and an aborted film from Oscar-winning director Jon Blair, entitled "Shadow of the Jaguar".

== Prospective projects ==
Metrostop Entertainment optioned a number of properties in a short space of time, including properties created by Rick Rapier, Bob Layton, David Michelinie and Dick Giordano of Future Comics, Helen Falconer's 1999 novel Primrose Hill and the THQ PlayStation 2 videogame franchise Red Faction II.
