= Psi Lords =

Starwatchers (aka Psi-Lords)
- Cover of issue #1

Publication information
- Publisher: Valiant Comics
- First appearance: Rai and the Future Force #21 (1994)

The Psi-Lords are a fictional team of superheroes from the Valiant Comics universe.

== Publication history ==
The characters first appeared in the second volume of Rai and the Future Force #21 after a cameo in Magnus #36 and were featured in a short-lived, eponymous series of ten issues between 1994 and 1995. The characters and series occupied Valiant's 41st century setting.

== Organization history ==
=== Original Valiant continuity ===
The Psi-Lords are 41st century descendants of the H.A.R.D. Corps, a group set in modern Valiant continuity. The H.A.R.D Corps fought Toyo Harada of Harbinger using brain implants which allowed the Corp to access individual Harbinger superpowers. In 2999, the H.A.R.D. Corps leaves Earth when Toyo Harada is slain. They continue improving the brain implants until nanites are developed, allowing H.A.R.D. Corps to access all Harbinger powers simultaneously. The new technology halts aging, even reversing it for those past their prime. Red glowing eyes are a side effect, similar to Bloodshot, another Valiant nanite-powered hero. Conquering a planet occupied by Spider Aliens, the Corps establishes a home base, after which, the H.A.R.D. Corp is known as the Psi-Lords or Starwatchers.

No longer dependent on teamwork, individual members of the Psi-Lords conduct autonomous missions to guide and help around the galaxy. During this period, a Psi-Lord rebels and has to be killed by the others. Fearing further incidents, the leaders of the Psi-Lords reduce the powers each Watcher can use, hoping that this will force the members to rely upon teamwork and keep the prevent the Starwatchers from becoming overly self-reliant.

The Psi-Lords return to Earth in the 41st century, towards the end of the Malev War depicted in the Magnus and Rai titles. 17 years after the end of this war, the Psi-Lords series starts. Not trusted by humanity after their recent alien invasions, the Starwatchers work to gaining the trust of Earth and its leaders, particularly President Magnus.

== Powers and abilities ==
Starwatchers in action in Psi-Lords #10

All Psi-Lords are immortal, empowered by their nanite rich blood. Although they do not age, and heal quickly, they can suffer trauma-related deaths. Solar the Destroyer, a split personality of Solar, killed several Psi-Lords who attacked him.

There are three types of Psi-Lords, distinguished by the color of their uniforms:

- A red uniform indicates the wearer has access to brute-force type powers, such as invulnerability and super-strength and the ability to project protective shields. These are classified as Bastions.
- Orange uniforms were worn by Gunners, who were granted energy manipulation powers such as stun rays and blasts of flame.
- Yellow uniforms indicated a Scout, with powers such as flight, intangibility, and invisibility.

Much like their H.A.R.D Corps predecessors, Psi-Lords, except Gunners, often use firearms, other weapons and vehicles appropriate to the situation. Lifespans of hundreds of years are common for older members of the PSI-Lords, who can call upon much more experience and knowledge than shorter-lived humans. While highly intelligent, their arrogance and aloof ways make it difficult for them to interact with humans upon their return to Earth.

== Writers and artists ==
The following writers and artists created, wrote and illustrated the series:

1-: Anthony J. Bedard, writer/Mike Leeke, pencils/Dick Giordano, inks/Leeke & Giordano, cover.

3: Bedard, writer/Leeker, pencils/Giordano, inks/Leeke & Bob Layton, cover.

4: Bedard, writer/David Wong, pencils/Giordano, inks/Leeke & Giordano, cover.

5: Bedard, writer/Leeker, pencils/Giordano, inks/Leeke & Giordano, cover.

6: Bedard, writer/Leeke & Anthony Castrillo, pencils/Giordano, inks & cover.

7: Bedard, writer/Leeke, pencils/Giordano & Mike DeCarlo, inks/Leeke & Giordano, cover.

8: Bedard, writer/Howard Simpson, pencils/DeCarlo, inks/Leeke, cover.

9: Bedard, writer/Simpson, pencils/DeCarlo, inks/Leeke & Paul Autio, cover.

10: Bedard, writer/Simpson, pencils/DeCarlo, inks/Leeke & DeCarlo, cover.
