= DeMause =

deMause is a surname. Notable people with the surname include:

- Lloyd deMause (1931–2020), American psychoanalyst and social historian
- Neil deMause (born 1965), American journalist
