= L.A.W. (comics) =

DC Comics limited series

The L.A.W. (Living Assault Weapons)

Publication information
- Publisher: DC Comics
- Schedule: Monthly
- Format: Limited series
- Publication date: September 1999 - February 2000
- No. of issues: 6
- Main character(s): Blue Beetle; Captain Atom; Judomaster; Nightshade; Peacemaker; The Question; Sarge Steel

Creative team
- Written by: Bob Layton
- Penciller: Dick Giordano
- Inker: Bob Layton
- Letterer: John E. Workman Jr.
- Colorist: Tom Ziuko

The L.A.W. (Living Assault Weapons) is a six-issue American comic book limited series, published by DC Comics.

The starring team "The L.A.W." consisted of Charlton Comics characters Blue Beetle, The Question, Judomaster, Captain Atom, Peacemaker, Nightshade, and Sarge Steel. The first issue marked the first appearance of Mitchell Black as Peacemaker as well as the first appearance of super-villain Avatar. Alan Moore incarnated analogues of the team's first five main characters, along with the first incarnation of Peacemaker and Peter Cannon, Thunderbolt for the basis of his 1986 political thriller vigilante franchise Watchmen, whose character later reappear in Grant Morrison's The Multiversity series.

== Publication history ==
The L.A.W. (Living Assault Weapons) #1 debuted in September 1999, and was written and inked by Bob Layton with pencils by Dick Giordano. The series logo on each of the six covers spotlighted one specific member of The L.A.W., with the first issue highlighting "Blue Beetle". Subsequent issues were emblazoned with the names of (in order): the Question, Peacemaker, Nightshade, Judomaster, and Captain Atom. The six covers incorporated a foreground illustration of the named character, over a background image of the entire team which formed a continuous image when all six issues were placed in line.

The series ran monthly until February 2000, and was one of three projects by Layton and Giordano (who were soon to announce the formation of their own, with David Michelinie, Future Comics publisher) for DC in the same time period, alongside two Batman Elseworlds tales.

== Fictional history ==
The Avatar attacking the JLA Watchtower as seen in The L.A.W #1, art by Dick Giordano.

The L.A.W. was formed in response to the disappearance of the Justice League of America after they were attacked by the Avatar. After causing the JLA to disappear along with their Watchtower, he then attacked a European Space Agency launch facility. During the attack, Captain Atom showed up to stop him, but he was quickly defeated and captured by the Avatar. The Avatar kept Captain Atom trapped within a large crystal that contained his powers. The Avatar revealed that he needed Captain Atom's powers to carry out his plan.

Senior Advisor of Metahuman Affairs, Sarge Steel, was asked by the President to go to the Swiss Alps to find any information that he could about the Avatar and the disappearance of the JLA. Sarge Steel was being sent to the Swiss Alps because the Peacemaker Project was located there and they had a wide variety of information; specifically, information regarding the Avatar and the disappearance of the JLA. As Sarge Steel was arriving, the Avatar's Ravanans were attacking the Peacemaker Project. With the help of the new Peacemaker, Mitchell Black, they were able to defeat the Ravanans before too much of the base was destroyed.

During the fight at the Peacemaker Project, the Blue Beetle and the Question were investigating a group of Avatar's followers. It was here that they met up with Judomaster who was going out on his own to correct a wrong that he had committed (although he was unsure of what the "wrong that he committed" actually was yet). The three heroes were attacked by Avatar's group of followers and they fled in Blue Beetle's bug-shaped personal aircraft. While fleeing, they were contacted by Sergeant Steel to come and meet him in the Swiss Alps.

When they arrived at the Peacemaker Project's base, it was revealed that Nightshade was also there, recovering from a procedure that Fate had performed to remove a succubus that was inhabiting her body. She had developed new powers as a result of the procedure. She could now easily travel through shadows and use them to form a "shadow cyclone" as a weapon against the Ravanans that she had been tracking. Nightshade was able to prevent the Ravanans from capturing French Ambassador Yves Fortè.

During a battle with Avatar and his Ravanans, Peacemaker, Blue Beetle, The Question, and Judomaster were defeated and Judomaster was taken back to Avatar's base. While chained to the wall, Judomaster revealed that the Avatar is his former sidekick Tiger.

Nightshade was able to locate the missing JLA and the Watchtower by utilizing her new powers. She was able to free them from the stasis that the Avatar had placed them in and the JLA helped Nightshade repel the attacking Ravanans. The JLA returned to Earth to battle the remaining Ravanans while Peacemaker, Blue Beetle, and The Question went into outer space to destroy the targeting system that the Avatar had in place to destroy all of the military outlets in the world. Blue Beetle successfully shut down the system and averted a major catastrophe. Judomaster then met with the Avatar and, knowing that he was beaten, the Avatar gave up his mission.

The L.A.W. were able to free Captain Atom and all of the members went their separate ways. The Blue Beetle decided that he was going to take some time off from being a super-hero for a while so that he can better understand who he truly is.
