= Armorines: Project S.W.A.R.M. =

1999 video game

- Developer: Acclaim Studios London (Note: Ported to PlayStation by Distinctive Developments. The Game Boy Color version was developed by Neon.)
- Publisher: Acclaim Entertainment
- Platforms: Nintendo 64, Game Boy Color, PlayStation
- Release: Nintendo 64: NA: 9 December 1999; EU: 17 December 1999; Game Boy Color: NA: December 22, 1999; EU: 3 December 2000; PlayStation: NA: 4 May 2000; AU: 2000; EU: 23 November 2001
- Genre: First-person shooter
- Modes: Single-player, multiplayer

Armorines: Project S.W.A.R.M. is a 1999 first-person shooter developed by Acclaim Studios London and released for the Nintendo 64, Game Boy Color and PlayStation. It is based on the Armorines comic book from Valiant Comics, which was bought by Acclaim Entertainment.

== Gameplay ==
Armorines: Project S.W.A.R.M. is a first-person shooter with some on-rails segments. The game features five different environments taking place on earth and in space and has two characters to choose from: Tony Lewis and Myra Lane. Each character has a different starting weapon. Tony uses a slower but stronger gun than Myra, while Myra uses a faster machine gun-like weapon, which causes less damage. Additional weapons can be picked up throughout the game. The weapons available depend on which character the player chooses to play as. Each character features 3 weapons, while there are 5 special weapons. Each one of the special weapons is exclusive to a specific environment and can be powered up 3 times in its respective environment.

Armorines includes a co-op campaign and a multiplayer versus mode. The versus mode can accommodate up to 4 players, while the co-op mode supports 2 players. The Versus mode has 4 gameplay types:

- Deathmatch: Playable by 2-4 players. This game mode's objective is to get the most kills. The game can have a target amount of kills or have a timer set.
- Racewars: Playable by 2-4 players. In this game mode player can choose to play as any of the alien bug species, each one possessing different attributes and abilities. The objective in this game mode is get the most kills. The game can have a target amount of kills or have a timer set.
- Capture the Flag: This is a team based game for 2-4 players. The objective is to steal the other teams flag and return it to your base,
- King of the Hill: Playable by 2-4 players. The player must find the score zone, marked by a large flag, and stay inside of it to score points.

== Plot ==
A group of marines fitted with advanced futuristic suits of armor protect Earth from an invasion of extraterrestrial, spider-like beings. The marines protect the Earth by killing the spiders with their weapons. The game features 2 protagonists and playable characters, Tony Lewis and Myra Lane. Each character has a different load-out equipped with their Armorine suit. They are Armorines, a highly advanced, highly classified virtually indestructible fighting force equipped to survive the terrifying might of a nuclear conflict.

== Development ==
Armorines was developed by Acclaim Studios London and uses the Turok 2: Seeds of Evil engine. By using a Nintendo 64 Expansion Pak, the Nintendo 64 version can output higher resolution graphics (480x360). It is also compatible with the Rumble Pak.

== Reception ==
Reception

Aggregate score
Aggregator	Score		
Aggregator	GBC	N64	PS
GameRankings	57%	61%	30%

Review scores
Publication	Score		
Publication	GBC	N64	PS
AllGame	3/5	2.5/5	1.5/5
CNET Gamecenter	N/A	5/10	3/10
Electronic Gaming Monthly	N/A	5/10; 4.5/10; 6/10; 3/10	4/10; 3.5/10; 3/10
EP Daily	N/A	5/10	3/10
Famitsu	N/A	N/A	21/40
Game Informer	N/A	7.25/10	5/10
GameFan	N/A	69%	N/A
GamePro	N/A	4/5; 4/5; 4/5; 4.5/5	N/A
GameRevolution	N/A	B	N/A
GameSpot	N/A	5.4/10	2.9/10
Hyper	N/A	67%	N/A
IGN	7/10	5.8/10	3.5/10
M! Games	N/A	87%	N/A
N64 Magazine	N/A	76%	N/A
Next Generation	N/A	1/5	1/5
Nintendo Power	6.8/10	7.7/10	N/A
Official Nintendo Magazine	N/A	88%	N/A
Official U.S. PlayStation Magazine	N/A	N/A	0.5/5
Superjuegos	N/A	91/100	N/A
Video Games (DE)	N/A	71%	35%
Super Play (SE)	N/A	83/100	N/A

The Game Boy Color and Nintendo 64 versions received mixed reviews, while the PlayStation version received unfavourable reviews, according to the review aggregation website GameRankings. Doug Trueman of NextGen gave both the N64 and PlayStation versions negative reviews in two separate issues, first calling the former "a great step backward from Turok 2. If you're desperate to kill bugs, buy a can of Raid instead" (#62, February 2000); and later saying of the latter, "Like the plot of so many science-fiction horror flicks, this was a good idea gone horribly wrong" (#69, September 2000). In Japan, where the latter was ported and published by Acclaim Japan on 13 July 2000, Famitsu gave it a score of 21 out of 40.

The Enforcer of GamePro said of the Nintendo 64 version, "If you're looking for the best corridor shooter on the N64 right now, Armorines is it. The frenetic action, challenging missions, and creepy graphics will keep you blasting away through those cold winter nights." (Note: GamePro gave the Nintendo 64 version three 4/5 scores for graphics, sound, and control, and 4.5/5 for fun factor.) However, Hyper said of the same console version, "Armorines had potential, but somehow it's been spoiled."
