= Frenetic Five =

Video game trilogy

The Frenetic Five is a series of three text adventures about a band of superheroes, all made with TADS version 2 and distributed as freeware. The series was created by Neil deMause for the Interactive Fiction Competition.

== Games ==
- The Frenetic Five vs. Sturm und Drang (1997; TADS 2).
  - IF Comp 1997: 13th place. Winner of XYZZY Award for Best NPCs 1997. Also finalist for XYZZY Award for Best Individual PC at XYZZY Awards 1997.
  - Sturm and Drang (named after the German literary movement) are a pair of supervillains who intend to use a machine called the "melodramaturge" to imbue the world with excessive excitement.
- The Frenetic Five vs. Mr. Redundancy Man (1999; TADS 2).
  - Finalist for XYZZY Award for Best Individual Puzzle and XYZZY Award for Best NPCs at the XYZZY Awards 1999.
  - Mr. Redundancy Man's evil scheme is to tie the planet Earth in red tape.
- The Frenetic Five vs. the Seven Deadly Dwarves (2002; TADS 2).
  - Finalist for XYZZY Award for Best NPCs at the XYZZY Awards 2002.
  - The Seven Deadly Dwarves' evil plan is to blow up the mine's power plant. This is the only Frenetic Five game with a maze.

== Characters ==
- Brett, a.k.a. "Improv": The player. Improv is the leader of the group, and a dedicated MacGyver fan with a similar ability to devise improbable solutions to challenges encountered during the course of the game.
- Antonia, a.k.a. "Pastiche": According to FF1, every one of Pastiche's body parts has a different superpower. Was nicknamed "Swiss Army" in high school. She can: move (or "phase") her hand through solid objects; sing humorous variations of many songs; break plywood doors up to 1 centimeter in thickness (FF2); heat lasagna by telepathy (FF2); instantaneously slice and dice root vegetables, such as potatoes (FF3); disperse gory messes (FF3); discern compass directions underground (FF3). To offset Pastiche's many superpowers, she also has a number of weaknesses: she cannot phase through rope, and all her powers are inhibited near wheat products, such as pasta.
- Deborah, a.k.a. "The Clapper": Able to find any object by clapping her hands and naming it, making it beep if it is nearby. The least-used in the three games, she does not even appear in the third.
- Mitchel, a.k.a. "Lexicon", a.k.a. "Lex": A walking dictionary. Lex knows nearly all of the words of the English language, and can deduce which verbs are needed for puzzles. His nemesis is Mr. Redundancy Man, whose orations are torture for Lex.
- Pete, a.k.a. "Newsboy": The youngest of the pentet, Newsboy is a walking RSS feed, constantly receiving headlines from an unidentified source or sources.
- Cecily: The weekend desk worker at SuperTemps. Fills in for Bob in FF3.
- Medic Alert: Beeps loudly to alert the authorities. Fills in for Clapper in FF3.
