= Future Comics =

American comic book publishing company

- Industry: Comics
- Founded: 2000; first comic book published in 2002
- Founder: Bob Layton, Allen Berrebbi, David Michelinie, and Dick Giordano
- Defunct: 2004
- Headquarters: Tampa, Florida, later Burlington, Vermont, U.S.
- Key people: Bob Layton, Editor-in-Chief; Allen Berrebbi, CFO and Director of Marketing; David Michelinie, Head Writer; Dick Giordano, Art Director; Skip Farrell, Publisher
- Parent: Future Entertainment

Future Comics was an American comic book publishing company founded by industry polymath Bob Layton, and his creative partners (Layton's mentor, artist/editor Dick Giordano and his frequent writing-partner David Michelinie, CFO Allen Berrebbi) and publisher Skip Farrell.

== Pre-formation ==
Having achieved great success by relaunching Marvel Comics's Iron Man in the 1970s (with co-writer David Michelinie), Bob Layton had gone on to considerable acclaim in the early to mid-1990s at Valiant Comics, where he worked "first as co-architect of the Valiant Universe, and then, as Editor-in-Chief and Senior Vice President." Layton left Valiant, his home in New York City and the comics industry itself in 1996, and moved to Florida for a short retirement.

Layton returned to comics in 1998, working on a couple of Elseworlds for DC Comics with Dick Giordano, before returning to Marvel (and Iron Man) for a mini-series with frequent collaborator David Michelinie. His experiences at Marvel, however, left him disillusioned with mainstream comics and its post-slump "glut of inferior products," caused in large part by an inability in publishers to focus on "quality content," rather than "superficial elements and ancillary products development."

Realizing that "as much as people love the 21-page monthly comics," an over-reliance on "product [which] is being written exclusively for a niche audience... [means that] comics are not attractive to a mass market readership," Layton joined with Giordano (who also lived in Florida) and Michelinie to create a company which would produce "more mainstream—stuff that could be read by the 'Average Joe'."

== Formation ==
The formation of Future Entertainment (or "Future Comics") was announced by Bob Layton and Dick Giordano "at a press conference on Saturday, June 9th, 2000," during Charlotte, North Carolina's Heroes Convention.

In addition to wanting to produce comics for the 'Average Joe', Layton and Giordano had heard numerous retailers decry "the callous way they were being treated by Diamond," so Future intended to revolutionize comics distribution by directly selling to readers and retailers alike via the Internet. For two years after the initial launch, Layton and Giordano "mapped out a daring, but sound, business plan that would allow an independent publisher to be profitable in a market dominated by Marvel, DC and Diamond." Realizing that the workings of the direct market ultimately played a large factor in the survival of the smaller publishers, they decided that the best way forward was to circumvent the distribution network offered by Diamond (and therefore the steep discounts at which Diamond buys from publishers), cut out the middleman and distribute Future's titles through the Internet, through the "Future Comics Retailers' Club". In addition, Future's "sales department [ran] a toll-free 1-800 number," and sold direct to fans.

Future Comics debuted its first title - Freemind #0 - in August 2002. Co-written, edited and inked by Layton, with Michelinie as co-writer, Giordano penciling and colors and letters by Miguel Insignares and Albert T. DeGuzman respectively, Future Comics was soon being praised critically as a new Valiant or Marvel. Future's second title (Metallix) followed a few months later, and their best-seller Deathmask launched in March 2003, by which time "almost half of 1,100 comic retail shops in America were signed up" to buy direct from Future.

Before Deathmask would reach shops, however, Future's distribution system underwent a radical shift.

== Diamond deal ==
By the end of 2002, Layton alleges that Diamond became "concerned that our operation might pose a threat to them," and offered a partnership. Although a stated aim of Future had been to circumvent the monopolistic distribution network, in the short term, Future was not making a profit, and the promise of higher sales and better advertising through Diamond seemed like a good offer. In addition, some retailers had expressed concern over dealing directly with Future, allegedly fearful that Diamond might make things difficult for them. Despite Future offering free shipping and large wholesale discounts and making their output "100% returnable" (thereby effectively removing the main risk to the retailers of unsold stock) - and thus making their product "free for all intents and purposes" - retailers were not ordering enough copies to make Future viable. Complaints over price (initially Future's output carried a retail value of $3.50) was addressed, and the cover price lowered to a more standard $2.99. When these moves didn't help, Layton felt Future was left little alternative than to take advantage of the promises offered by Diamond.

Supposedly suggesting that Future could achieve coveted "Premier Publisher" status in Diamond's Previews comics catalog, Diamond also reportedly suggested that using their distribution network would double sales, Future Comics (which was suffering from going it alone) agreed. Unfortunately, this proved disastrous on several levels: Future's existing "Retailers' Club" network saw the move as a betrayal, leading Layton to retroactively admit that "abandoning our original self-distribution plan is what ultimately lead to the company's sad demise."

On December 20, 2002:

"Future Comics, the publishing and distribution company founded by industry veterans Bob Layton, Dick Giordano, Allen Berrebbi & David Michelinie, announced... that it has reached an agreement with Diamond Comic Distributors that will allow Diamond to carry all Future Comics products."

Citing growth and movie-deals, Layton, as Editor-In Chief said that Future had "reconsidered our planned working relationship with the industry's distribution leader-Diamond," and attempted to find a middle ground that "would allow us to do business with each other while still competing as distribution rivals in the marketplace." Attempting to reassure Future's own existing Retailers' Club system, Layon said that the Diamond deal did not "compromis[e] the spirit of Future Comics' unique business plan," and that their "sales policy has been clearly stated from the beginning: we'll sell to anyone as long as it's on our terms, and this Diamond deal does not compromise that policy."

Layton further intimated that Future's Internet-based distribution method was being somewhat hampered by some retailers not having easy access, and noted that, since Future was "already do[ing] business with several of Diamond's competitors," it was "only fair" to "show them the same respect." Dick Giordano praised Bill Schanes and Steve Geppi, citing his decades-long relationship with them (and Diamond) through DC's early entry into the direct sales market.

Diamond's January 2003 Previews catalog contained listings for the new series Deathmask as well as for Freemind issue #5 and Metallix #4, plus the availability of back issues for "customers who missed the opportunity to order them directly from Future Comics."

Deathmask #1 was released in March 2003, with Freemind and Metallix seeing a slight delay in publication, (due, apparently, to vandalism (below)) and arriving in April. Sales, however, did not rise as hoped - indeed, Layton wrote to investors after Future's collapse: "orders dropped."

=== Free Comic Book Day ===
In an attempt to boost sales, and hopefully combat the perceived dual negativity from both Diamond (allegedly unhappy with Future's decision to still distribute outside of the Diamond system) and the Future Comics Retailer's Club (unhappy with Future's decision to solicit through Diamond), Layton and publisher Skip Farrell were encouraged to participate in the second Free Comic Book Day event on May 3, 2003.

Diamond supposedly intimated that a successful FCBD comic would see "a 12% increase in sales as a result." Necessarily speculative, this estimate proved "entirely false," and after distributing 90,000 copies of Metallix #1 (at a cost of some "$16,000 in promotional expenses," to cover the free nature of the product), Future "didn’t get a single percentage point bump in . . . sales."

== Outside problems ==
In addition to the struggle to navigate between the contradictory and mutually exclusive demands of retailers either for Diamond distribution or non-Diamond distribution, Future Entertainment suffered serious setbacks behind-the-scenes. Financial mismanagement necessitated a "sizable layoff" of "employees in non-critical positions" in January, 2003 (not long after the Diamond deal). The following month, on February 17, "Future Comics' office was vandalized" and the computer network disabled by a virus which severely compromised Future's e-commerce ventures.

In addition, "PDF files of our latest crop of books were corrupted" by the virus, delaying the newly solicited-through-Diamond issues of Metallix and Freemind, giving Future "almost two months without any income from sales," even as debts accumulated.

== Recent history ==
Future announced in April 2003 that it had hired Jason Hughes as Sales and Marketing Manager, but despite this, and continual but slow-moving interest from Hollywood, after seven issues each of Metallix and Freemind, three of Deathmask and zero of Future's fourth-title (The Peacekeeper) having seen print, the company decided it had to "redirect [its] efforts into a more profitable market," and stopped soliciting individual issues.

Citing "rising art & editorial costs," Layton notes that such "costs are simply not aligned to the percentage of sales in the comics industry." Therefore, in August 2003 (after a brief hiatus - Deathmask and Freemind's last issues were dated May; Metallix #6 was June), Future Comics announced that it would be concentrating not on the declining direct (comics) market, but on the mass (books) market, and following publishers such as CrossGen in focusing its efforts on trade paperbacks and graphic novel-releases.

"In a statement posted on the Comics Continuum website, Future Comics president and Editor-in-Chief Bob Layton said, "It has become rather obvious that consumer tastes are gravitating towards the trade paperback format. While the direct market continues to decline, mass market interest in the genre is on the increase. Europe and Japan have embraced this format for decades and statistics clearly show that the U.S. is heading in the same direction." " Layton cited "statistics clearly show[ing] the U.S. is now heading in the same direction" with a predicted sales growth of 30% in 2004, and noting that in contrast, the costs of producing a monthly comic continued to rise.

Presciently, in light of subsequent more numerous shifts away from monthly comics towards collections, Philip Schweier, writing at ComicBookBin noted in September that Future's move was a bold one, but that a move away from comics one-time "cousins" (magazines)' monthly periodicity, "at this time may be only a quick-fix for current problems within the comics industry." Writing that "such a move would seem more viable since... a trade paperback has a much longer shelf life [than a monthly comic issue]," mass market and bookselling logic seemed to also (as did Schweier) tacitly supports Future's move, but it was not to be. Ironically paralleling the similarly timed arc of equally short-lived publisher CrossGen towards "a mass market format", Future's move came "far too late in the game to prevent the company from drowning in debt," with new investors and funding unavailable to back up the decision to produce a mass market product.

=== Cessation of monthly titles and move to digital ===
Future Comics cancelled its monthly titles in 2004. In 2012 the company released its entire catalog digitally. In addition to the books that had been published in print, several other stories that had never been printed were included. One of these titles was Peacekeeper #1. Later in 2012, Future partnered with publisher IDW Publishing to publish the graphic novel Colony. Colony was marketed as Dick Giordano's last work.

=== Critiquing the collapse ===
Commenting somewhat wryly on Layton's description of events, ComicBookGalaxy's Christopher Allen casts doubt on some of Layton's pronouncements about the restructuring and ultimate failure of Future Comics. He notes, in particular that Layton's critique of Diamond's "monopoly" and alleged concern over the perceived "threat" of Future Comics is hardly likely to be more than sour grapes, if for no other reason than that Future's small number of titles were hardly in a position to threaten Diamond's thousands of other titles. Moreover, Allen sees more than a little hyperbole in Layton's reiteration that, prior to Diamond's involvement, Future's solo distribution system was "successful," and that the burden of blame in Future's demise thus lay (as Layton seems to imply) with Diamond. Allen also wonders why Layton's dissection of the flagging comics industry didn't play more of a part before Future ran into difficulties, and notes that Future did itself no favors in the move from monthly comics to collections. Allen recalls:

"that trade paperbacks of the first story arcs of all four series were in fact solicited... the prices being $16-$17 each, meaning for a four issue arc, each $2.99-$3.50 issue was now, sans individual cover, priced at $4.00 and up."

Which, Allen suggests, is not an ideal way to address a lack of sales.

== Film deals ==
Future's comics properties attracted Hollywood interest swiftly. Layton mentioned as one reason to deal with Diamond in December 2002 that "the FREEMIND movie [was] on the fast track," even then, and a July, 2003 press release talks of the companies works "attract[ing] the eye of some of the top names in Hollywood."

Layton, Michelinie and Giordano had, by July 2003, "established a relationship" with Metrostop Entertainment and D-No Entertainment to adapt their properties for both the big and/or small screens, after what Layton described as "a shaky start," with regards to film deals, which saw Future "hooking up with the wrong type of representation for [their] needs." Future Comics future-proofed its concepts by "specifically tailor[ing]" each series to allow for easy translation:

"into film, television or video games. The business plan from day one was to establish intellectual properties that would attract the largest possible audience. Clearly this initiative has worked wonders, as evidenced by the fervor all four properties are currently causing in Hollywood."

Metrostop Entertainment co-founder, Robert Keyghobad, described Future Comics as "not only a producer's dream, but a screenwriter's as well. They're a true diamond in the rough," "an original work that speaks to you." In the seven months since December, Deathmask was said to have joined Freemind in "leading the charge in Hollywood," described by Keyghobad as "more than your traditional story of good vs. evil... filled with magic, a unique setting and incredibly complex and dark characters," while Freemind was Future's launch title, an "incredibly cerebral and character driven comic that reflects the expansion of the human spirit."

The press release closed, optimistically, with noting that alongside the front-runners, both ""Metallix" and "Peacekeeper" [we]re running close behind... a staggering testament to the talents behind Future Comics," since all properties we so swiftly in development.

Despite Future Comics' demise, Layton's note to investors closed on an upbeat note, reporting that:

"there continues to be interest from Hollywood in producing feature film versions the Future Comics characters. Those talks are ongoing.... Hopefully, our labor of love may yet live on in an entirely different venue.

"Only time will tell."

== Titles ==
Future's planned titles were Freemind, Metallix, Deathmask, and Peacekeeper (unfortunately no issues of Peacekeeper were ever published when the company closed down). The company released its entire catalog digitally in 2012. It included unpublished issues of Deathmask, Metallix and Peacekeeper. Future published the graphic novel Colony late in 2012 in a joint venture with IDW Publishing.

Late in 2018, Future released 5 issues that had previously been available only in digital with Peacekeeper finally seeing print along with subsequent issues of Future's previous titles.

- Freemind #0-7 (Aug. 2002-June 2003)
  - Freemind : The Origin (April 2003) (trade paperback reprints Freemind issues #0-3)
- Metallix #0-6 (Dec. 2002-June 2003)
- Deathmask #1-3 (March 2003-June 2003)
- Peacekeeper (unpublished)

Books that were initially Digital Only; Published in 2018.

- Freemind #8
- Metallix #7
- Deathmask #4-5
- Peacekeeper #1

Graphic novels

- Colony
