= Zoom Suit =

Zoom Suit Logo

Zoom Suit is a series of comic books created and written by John Taddeo, that debuted in April, 2006, a year after the animated short film won its first Best Animation at the Palm Beach Film Festival. There were a total of four issues published through July 2006.

== Overview ==
The story follows an alien suit, taken from the crash at Roswell in 1947, that the government has been unsuccessfully trying to reverse engineer. The suit is stolen by NSA agent Simon Bane, but lost in a free-fall from a helicopter and found by 12-year-old Myles, who mistakes the suit for a particularly cool Halloween costume. Superhero-style adventures follow - at the urging of Myles' friend and crush, Brittany - as Myles learns the powers and limitations of the suit while avoiding Bane.

One of the more popular alternate covers for Zoom Suit Issue #1

The comic is interspersed with humor and partially serves as a parody of other comics in the genre, including Spider-Man, X-Men, Green Lantern, and others. Pop culture references are hidden throughout each issue, and all of the 'advertisements' are either in-jokes or clues to the interactive online treasure hunt for the second short film.

Written by John Taddeo, Zoom Suit features both interior and cover art by Billy Dallas Patton. Each issue has at least two different covers, although issue #1 had more than half a dozen. Other cover artists include established comics illustrators Bob Layton, Gene Colan, Bart Sears, Jim Starlin, Billy Tucci, Jorge Palacios and Keron Grant.

The Zoom Suit animated short, which combines traditional and computer animation, has won Best Animation awards at film festivals around the country, as well as "Grand Festival" and "Best in Show" awards. The suit was adopted as the official school mascot of the Charter High School of the Arts in Sherman Oaks, California in March, 2006.

== Characters ==
The Zoom Suit: The Zoom Suit is alien technology recovered from the Roswell crash in 1947, the only undamaged suit of its kind. So far, known capabilities include flight, superhuman strength, and sonic speed, but there are powers yet to be revealed, including laser blasts. It also automatically shuts down when it gets wet. Too small for the average adult human, it's just the right size for a 12-year-old boy.

Myles: Twelve-year-old Myles is a latch-key kid and an outcast. He seems to have a bit of a crush on his friend and neighbor, Brittany, and it is at her urging that he steps up to become a 'superhero' after donning a suit he mistook for a Halloween costume. Initially frightened and reluctant, he's a little more comfortable with the idea after his first successful rescue.

Brittany: Brittany is Myles' blonde and bubbly superhero-loving neighbor. She's the one who, with a kiss on the cheek, convinced Myles that saving people was the thing to do after he found himself the owner of a hi-tech alien suit.

Simon Bane: Simon Bane is "the most decorated NSA agent in history", who looks to have a power-hungry larcenous streak. Having survived the 10,000-foot fall from the helicopter he blew up stealing the suit, the least that can be said about Bane is that he's something more than human. Bane's speech tends to be riddled with oxymorons.

Katerina Tesla: The granddaughter of Nikola Tesla, NSA scientist Katerina Tesla is smart and sexy. Even though she doesn't know much about the suit, it's more than anyone else does.

Hot Spot: Little is known about this character except that she has the ability to create flames at will. More will be revealed in Zoom Suit II in October, 2007.
