= Unity (team) =

Fictional super team

- Cover of Unity #1 by Doug Braithwaite

Group publication information
- Publisher: Valiant Entertainment
- First appearance: Unity #1 (November 2013)
- Created by: Matt Kindt

In-story information
- Member(s): Eternal Warrior; X-O Manowar; Livewire; Ninjak; GIN-GR; Former Members; Toyo Harada; Bloodshot; Zephyr

Unity

Series publication information
- Schedule: Monthly
- Format: Ongoing series
- Publication date: Nov. 2013
- Number of issues: (Vol. 2): 25 Issues, 1 0 Issue

Creative team
- Writer(s): Matt Kindt; James Asmus
- Artist(s): Doug Braithwaite; CAFU; Stephen Segovia; Cary Nord; Pere Pérez; Jose Luiz; Trevor Hairsine; Sandro Ribeiro; Alisson Rodrigues; Jefte Palo
- Letterer(s): Dave Sharpe
- Colorist(s): Brian Reber; Matt Milla; Andrew Dalhouse; Ulises Arreola
- Creator(s): Matt Kindt
- Editor(s): Josh Johns; Warren Simons; Kyle Andrukiewicz; Alejandro Arbona

Unity is a superhero team featuring in titles published by Valiant Entertainment. Taking its name from the classic Valiant crossover Unity, the Unity team first appears in Unity #1 written by Matt Kindt and illustrated by Doug Braithwaite. Unity is a global law enforcement team of super-powered operatives dedicated to protecting humanity from top-secret threats. The team works as agents of the Global Agency for Threat Excision (G.A.T.E.) and acts under the direction of American and British intelligence.

== Publication history ==
Valiant teased the arrival of a new Unity in August 2013. Unity Executive Editor Warren Simons described the book as being a thematic extension of the original 1992 event in that it unites several of the corners of the Valiant Universe for the first time. The book was launched with the intention of being accessible to new readers, more so than any other book since the relaunch with X-O Manowar. The book kicked off with Issues #1-#4 crossing over with X-O Manowar Vol. 3 #19-#22.

Valiant announced that the title would end in December 2015 with a 48-page issue comedy anthology. The final issue featured stories not just from regular writer Matt Kindt but others including James Asmus, Elliott Kalan, Daniel Kibblesmith, Tom Scharpling, Michael Kupperman, Ty Templeton, Donny Cates and Eliot Rahal. When it was decided to make the final issue a comedy anthology Unity editor Alejandro Arbona got in contact with several writers, including some new to the Valiant Universe.

== Fictional team biography ==
After Aric of Dacia escapes from the clutches of the Vine aliens and returns to Earth he seeks to claim a large portion of what was formerly his home nation of Dacia, now modern day Romania. The world however, does not take lightly to the invasion of Romania. Russia in particular who share a border with Romania are primed to attack.

To prevent warfare from breaking out Toyo Harada, CEO of the Harbinger Foundation, enlists the help of the Eternal Warrior who had unsuccessfully tried to talk his old friend Aric out of his invasion. Harada plans to use his own team of powerful Psiots to take down Aric while he has assassin-for-hire Ninjak take down X-O Manowar's ship. The plan ultimately fails with the Psiots being taken down before a battle can take place and Ninjak getting captured by X-O.

Harada then turns to his former pupil, the currently exiled Livewire and begins to assemble a new team. Meanwhile, Russia launched an attack on Aric's camp in Bucharest however they are annihilated. The team attacks Aric in his spaceship which he then launches into space. Livewire uses her powers to sever the connection between Aric and the Ship, sending the ship plummeting into the ocean. Livewire manages to wear the X-O Manowar armor and rescue everybody aboard the ship leaving Harada in charge of the armor. The team realises however that Harada has ulterior motives and team up with X-O Manowar to defeat Harada.

Livewire joins Ninjak in MI-6 in exchange for protection against her former mentor, Harada. During her first mission however she is kidnapped by Dr Silk. Ninjak recruits the Eternal Warrior and X-O Manowar to go and rescue her. Dr Silk attempts to brainwash everybody in the world using a virus that is triggered by looking at a strangely written code. However Unity was able to defeat him.

Unity once again comes together this time with new member Bloodshot as the Armor Hunters launch deadly attacks towards the Earth to destroy the X-O Manowar armor. The armor hunters unleash devastating destruction in Mexico City forcing Unity to regroup in the United States while Livewire manages to bring down the Armor Hunter's orbiting headquarters GIN-GR but the crash-landing decimates downtown Los Angeles.

After defeating the Armor Hunters the US and UK governments form the Global Agency for Threat Excision or G.A.T.E. and swiftly commandeer all the technology left by the aliens. In an attempt to avoid fear and panic G.A.T.E. takes Unity public, making Livewire the public face. While Aric is unavailable the team searches for a fourth member, ultimately recruiting former Renegade Faith Herbert Zephyr. The unchecked power of Unity however doesn't sit well with some members of the international community. Several ambassadors resort to activating their own rival team of mysterious covert agents - the United. After a violent battle with The United Faith leaves the team.

When Divinity crash lands in the Australian outback with seemingly godlike power Unity attempts to make contact. Sensing their hostility Divinity warps reality around each of the Unity members and traps them in an endless loop of time. Ultimately as Divinity accepts that the family he could have had is gone Unity takes him into custody.

== Membership ==
=== Main team ===
Codename	Real Name	Joined in	Notes
Toyo Harada	Toyo Harada	Unity #1	Leaves team in Unity #5
Ninjak	Colin King	Unity #1	
Eternal Warrior	Gilad Anni-Padda	Unity #1	
Livewire	Amanda McKee	Unity #1	
X-O Manowar	Aric Dacia	Unity #5	
Bloodshot	Ray Garrison	Unity #9	Not an official member
Zephyr	Faith Herbert	Unity #12	Leaves team in Unity #14
GIN-GR	GIN-GR	Unity #12	
Anchor	Unknown	Unity #22	Supposed to be on Harada's original Unity team. Dies in Unity #22

=== Other teams ===
As revealed by the Warmonger there have been several Unity like teams in the past. Harada's team of Psiots also referred to themselves as Unity when battling X-O Manowar.

Medieval Team	1800s Team	1913 Team	Shademen	70s Team	Harada's Team
Sir Kwain	Doyle	Eternal Warrior	Wind	Wind	Bomb
Blastr	Rapier	Dell	Silencio	Zeppelin II	Mirror
Marinette	Blunderbuss	Alpha	The Veil	Bloodshot	The Captain
		Breaker	Double Blind	Wyrm	Ether

== Collected editions ==
Title	Material collected	Published date	ISBN
Unity Vol. 1: To Kill A King	Unity (vol. 2) #1-4	October 2015	978-1939346889
Unity Vol. 2: Trapped by Webnet	Unity (vol. 2) #5-7, X-O Manowar (vol. 3) #5	July 2014	978-1939346346
Unity Vol. 3: Armor Hunters	Unity (vol. 2) #8-11	December 2014	978-1939346445
Unity Vol. 4: The United	Unity (vol. 2) #12-14, 0, Harbinger: Faith #0	March 2015	978-1939346544
Unity Vol. 5: Homefront	Unity (vol. 2) #15-18	August 2015	978-1939346797
Unity Vol. 6: The War-Monger	Unity (vol. 2) #19-22	December 2015	978-1939346902
Unity Vol. 7: Revenge of the Armor Hunters	Unity (vol. 2) #23-25	April 2016	978-1682151136
Unity Deluxe Edition Book 1	Unity (vol. 2) #0-14	October 2015	978-1939346575

== In other media ==
Unity appears in Ninjak vs. the Valiant Universe with Eternal Warrior, X-O Manowar, Livewire, Bloodshot, Archer & Armstrong and Ninjak as members of the team.
