= Neil deMause =

American journalist

Neil deMause (born November 19, 1965, in Manhattan, New York) is a Brooklyn-based freelance journalist who writes for books, magazines, and newspapers on mainly New York City's social policy issues. He has been a writer for Baseball Prospectus since 2003, contributing occasional articles about stadium building and baseball finance. He is co-author with Joanna Cagan on the 1999 book Field of Schemes: How the Great Stadium Swindle Turns Public Money into Private Profit. His book was re-issued in 2008 and was published by University of Nebraska Press/ Bison Books. The book also has its own website.

== Career ==
He is a writer and editor for The Village Voice and contributes to other print and on-line publications as well as for Fairness and Accuracy in Reporting, Extra!, Slate, Baseball Prospectus, and CNNMoney.com. He previously worked for Metro New York as an op-ed columnist for two years and spent six years as a question writer for the popular board game Trivial Pursuit. He is the author of several award-winning works of interactive fiction, among them Frenetic Five and Lost New York.

He has also taken part in politics. DeMause testified before Congress stating the politics and financing of sports stadiums. His testimonies have appeared on a number of TV and radio programs which include ESPN, Jesse Ventura's radio show, and Democracy Now!. Neil is frequently a guest speaker at the Columbia University Graduate School of Journalism's sports journalism courses.

He is the author of numerous works of interactive fiction, including Lost New York, which was nominated for an XYZZY Award in 1996.

== Awards ==
His writings and investigations on the city and national welfare policy have earned him with a Project Censored award. Also, his work in this area appeared in the anthology "America's Mayor, America's President?".
