= H.A.R.D. Corps =

Fictional superhero team

Group publication information
- Publisher: Valiant Comics
- First appearance: Harbinger #10 (October 1992)
- Created by: Jim Shooter; David Lapham

In-story information
- Type of organization: Team

H.A.R.D. Corps

Series publication information
- Schedule: Monthly
- Format: Ongoing
- Genre: Superhero
- Publication date: December 1992 – June 1995
- Number of issues: 30
- Main character(s): Gunslinger; Shakespeare; Flatline; Hammerhead; Hotshot

Creative team
- Writer(s): David Michelinie, Bob Layton, Jorge Gonzalez, Maurice Fontenot, Dan Abnett, Andy Lanning, John F. Kelly, Mike Baron
- Penciller(s): David Lapham, Mike Leeke, Bernard Chang, Andrew Wendel, Ted Halstead, Yvel Guichet, Rik Levins, Jordi Ensign, Steve Ellis, John Calimee
- Inker(s): Bob Layton, Katherine Bollinger, Tom Ryder, Paul Autio, Rodney Ramos, John Dixon, Frank McLaughlin, Jennifer Marrus, Richard Space, Rudy Nebres, Mike DeCarlo
- Creator(s): Jim Shooter; David Lapham

H.A.R.D. Corps is a fictional superhero team appearing in books published by the American publisher Valiant Comics. The H.A.R.D. Corps team first appeared in Harbinger #10 (Oct. 1992), and were created by Jim Shooter and David Lapham.

== Publication history ==
=== Original Valiant continuity ===
The original series ran for a total of 30 issues, from December 1992 – June 1995. Bob Layton explained the style of the series: "When David [Michelinie] and I set out to do H.A.R.D.Corps it was because ... We like light-hearted, hard hitting, bash 'em in the face, sock 'em guys."

The cover of the first issue was pencilled by Jim Lee over a layout by Bob Layton. Lee had initially declined to take on the cover because he was too busy, but eventually did it in return for Valiant president Steven Massarsky getting him two U2 tickets.

=== 2012 Valiant continuity ===
In the second relaunch/reboot of the Valiant Universe, the HARD Corps was prominently featured in the third volume of Bloodshot, from issues 14 to 21. The further highlight this, the third volume was briefly titled Bloodshot and H.A.R.D. Corps.

== Premise ==
=== Original Valiant continuity ===
The acronym stands for Harbinger Active Resistance Division. The title's focus is a corporate strike team which represents Omen Enterprises. Omen Enterprises are at war with Toyo Harada, and his Harbinger Corporation, which he uses in his goal to control all Harbingers. The original H.A.R.D. team is a group of fighter pilots who are victims of various accidents, rendered comatose, and revived with experimental neural implants.

The neural implants utilized by Omen Enterprises allow the team members to mimic the powers of Harbingers, and are all assigned and managed by an operator named "Softcore." The cerebral fail-safe procedures given are that any rebellion from the team members, as well as capture or death will result in the explosion of the neural implants.

=== 2012 Valiant continuity ===
In the 2012 Valiant relaunch, the team works for Project Rising Spirit, instead of the Omen Corporation. In this timeline, the team is being tasked by PRS to retrieve Bloodshot from the Harbinger Corporation.

== Characters ==
The original team was composed of former fighter pilots and went by call signs in the field, starting a Corps tradition of using codenames.

=== Original team ===
The original team were all Vietnam War veterans who served together in the same unit.

- Gunslinger — The H.A.R.D. Corps leader, Charlie Palmer is often referred to as Major by the others (his military rank).
- Shakespeare — Aaron Brillstein is a Vietnam vet with a tendency to quote literature.
- Maniac — Jan Chahosky is a reckless warrior who seldom waits for orders. He dies in H.A.R.D. Corps #1. He is later replaced by Flatline.
- Hammerhead — Marion Virgil Peeves loves to fight and is overly proud of the scars he accumulates on his bald head. He also hates his first name.

=== Other members ===
- Superstar — A former movie star, Rick Silver is not one of the original members of the project, but he is with the team as of their first appearance. He dies covering the group's escape when the implants that make him invulnerable fail. This failure was a deliberate malfunction caused by the CEO of Omen due to his feeling that Superstar's behavior was becoming more and more erratic. He is replaced by Hotshot.

=== Later additions ===
- Flatline — (first appearance: H.A.R.D. Corps #1) Sam Yoom Kim was once a cop in his native Korea, but while in an L.A. riot he was injured trying to help others and fell into a coma. He replaced Maniac. Sam's clever thinking made the team see his merit, and he was the first member to question the morality of some missions the Corps undertook (such as capturing Bloodshot).
- Hotshot — (first appearance: H.A.R.D. Corps #7) Christine Eastman is both the first female member of the Corps and the first member of the reserves to make the grade. The former leader of the reserve squadron, her leadership abilities and dedication to completing a mission reflect her military training.

=== Reserves ===
- Perp - Former gang member, he adapts easily to H.A.R.D. Corps-style shootouts, but lacks the strategic abilities of the first string members.
- Wipeout - A California surfer-type, his unwillingness to kill in combat situations often places him at risk. Wipeout will usually employ his kickboxing training or a nonlethal power to fight, though experience made him more willing to use deadly force.
- Grasshopper - Especially trained in martial arts and infiltration, Grasshopper is an espionage agent who is sent on solo missions.
- Ironhead - A former boxer, drugged into a coma to fix a big match. He is allowed to die seeking revenge when his access to Harbinger powers is cut off.

Towards the end of the series, other recruits were drafted to form a second Corps team with Perp, Grasshopper, and Wipeout. These included:

- Football
- Brainsmash
- Satin Doll
- Payback
- Disco

=== Support staff ===
The operators who maintain contact with field agents and manage their powers.

- Softcore — usually the operator for most missions.
- Lifeline
- Safeguard
- Sigmund Heydrich — The director of the H.A.R.D. Corps operation, he determines how to deploy the team. An expensive operation (Softcore remarks that training and equipping a single operative runs into eight figures), he frequently had to justify expenditures to Omen Enterprises.
- Midnight — also known as Earl, a teenaged scientist working for Harada, he scrambles the Corps's transmissions when they attack a lab he's in, enabling them to be captured. Hotshot disillusions him on the Harbinger Foundation, and he allows the Corps to escape without opposition from his devices. He later appears to aid the strike team.

== Powers and abilities ==
Each member of the H.A.R.D. Corps could utilize one Harbinger power at a time. To switch powers, an operative had to radio Softcore and request she make the switch while at headquarters. They are often seen using a defensive power and firearms for offense, but switching powers is a quick enough process to be accomplished in combat. Needing to communicate to switch their powers sometimes becomes a weakness: Corps operatives who lose their headset cannot switch powers, and sometimes their opponents will jam or disrupt communications with their base, knowing that "microbeams" are used to alter the mimicked powers. In new continuity powers are supplied to operatives via Lifeline through their reverse engineered Harada Tech neural implants developed by Project Rising Spirit. Agents can only utilize one power at a time due to the human biology being unaccustomed to hardwired harbinger ability usage, special command sequences for chaining different powers in tandem through the bio-configuration process can be initiated such as; sequence 2, 4, 6, sequence epsilon, etc. The Implants are also wired to explode and can be detonated automatically either upon capture or death of operative and remotely from PRS home base.

=== Original Valiant continuity ===
The powers the H.A.R.D. Corps demonstrate include:

- Ghost Mode - Also known as intangibility
- Airborne - Flight
- Detonation Mode - User is able to cause explosions via hand contact
- Invulnerability - User is unable to be damaged, but can still be knocked out
- Shield Mode - Ability to form an energy shield in one direction
- Ultra-Mass - Greatly increases user's density
- Neural Spike - Ability to throw "spikes" which disrupt the nervous system in order to incapacitate targets
- Sunburst - Ability to fire blasts of flame from hands
- Strobe Burst - Generation of a blinding flash of light
- Arc Charge - Projection of electrical energy
- Stun Ram - Projection of a ray of concussive force
- Tsetse - Touch range sleep attack
- Strength Mode - Grants superhuman strength
- Grenade Mode - Ability to generate and throw explosive "grenades" of energy
- Static Mode - Disrupts communications and transmissions
- Decoy Mode - Creation of illusions, such as holograms
- Jolt Mode - Administers an adrenaline surge upon touch, used to counteract soporifics
- Invisibility - Turns user invisible
- Forcefield - Completely encases user in a protective aura

=== Valiant Entertainment continuity ===
- Ghost Mode - Enables invisibility and intangibility
- Arc Charge - Electrical blasts
- Stun Ram - Telekinetic concussive force
- True Sight - dispels illusions
- Fire - Pyrokinetic discharge and flame resistance
- Breakdown - Molecular cohesion dissolving
- Shields - Force barriers
- Detonation - remote explosions
- Flight - aviation
- Neural Spike - Telepathic stunning
- Suggestion Mode - Hypnotic persuasion
- Muscle Mode - Psionic super strength
- Sleep - Induced neurocognitive deficit

A special store of one off powers called Bee Stings can be issued, but are adeptly named due to the fatality ratio making them useful only once.

- Radiation - Destructive nuclear blasts
- Speed - Enhanced locomotion
- Absorption - Energy drain

Occasionally H.A.R.D. Corps will capture new Harbingers to analyze their powers. If a previously unknown power is discovered, a record is made in order to enable replication of the power.

== Continuity ==
A spinoff of the Harbinger title, H.A.R.D. Corps is the ancestor of Psi Lords, which is set in the 41st century of the Valiant Universe and dealt with the descendants of the Corps.

== Creative teams ==
Issue #	Writer	Penciler	Inker	Cover
1	David Michelinie	David Lapham	Bob Layton	Jim Lee & Layton
2	Michelinie	Mike Leeke	Bob Layton	Leeke & Layton
3	Michelinie	Leeke	Katherine Bollinger & Layton	Leeke & Barry Windsor-Smith
4	Michelinie	Leeke	Tom Ryder	Leeke & Ryder
5	Michelinie & Layton	Bernard Chang	Ryder	Leeke & Ryder
6	Michelinie & Layton	Leeke	Ryder	Leeke & Ryder
7–8	Michelinie & Layton	Leeke	Paul Autio	Leeke & Ryder
9	Michelinie	Andrew Wendel	Autio	Leeke & Ryder
10	Michelinie	Ted Halstead	Autio	Leeke & Autio
11–16	Michelinie	Yvel Guichet	Rodney Ramos	Guichet & Ramos
17	Layton	Rik Levins	John Dixon	Guichet & Ramos
18	Jorge Gonzalez	Levins	Dixon	Levins & Dixon
19–20	Maurice Fontenot	Levins	Dixon	Levins & Dixon
21–22	Dan Abnett & Andy Lanning	Jordi Ensign	Dixon	Levins & Dixon
23	Fontenot & Gonzalez	Ensign	Frank McLaughlin & Jennifer Marrus	Levins & Layton
24	John F. Kelly	Ensign	Ensign	Levins & Layton
25	Mike Baron	Steve Ellis	Richard Space	
26	Baron	Ellis	Rudy Nebres	DR
27–29	Baron	John Calimee	Ramos	Val Mayerik
30	Baron	Leeke	Mike DeCarlo	Grey

== Collected editions ==
Title	Material collected	Published date	ISBN
Valiant Masters: H.A.R.D. Corps Vol. 1	H.A.R.D. Corps #1-6, Harbinger (vol. 1) #10-11	June 2014	978-1939346285
Bloodshot Vol. 4: H.A.R.D. Corps	Bloodshot and H.A.R.D. Corps #14-17, Bloodshot (vol. 3) #0	January 2014	978-1939346193
Bloodshot Vol. 5: Get Some and Other Stories	Bloodshot and H.A.R.D. Corps #18-19, 22-23, Bloodshot and H.A.R.D. Corps: H.A.R.D. Corps #0	September 2014	978-1939346315
Archer & Armstrong Vol. 5: Mission: Improbable	Bloodshot and H.A.R.D. Corps #20-21 and Archer & Armstrong: Archer #0, Archer & Armstrong #18-19	June 2014	978-1939346353
Bloodshot Deluxe Edition Book 2	Bloodshot and H.A.R.D. Corps #14-23, Bloodshot and H.A.R.D. Corps: H.A.R.D. Corps #0 and Bloodshot (vol. 3) #0, 24-25, Archer & Armstrong #18-19	October 2015	978-1939346810
