= X-O Manowar =

Fictional super hero

- Cover of X-O Manowar (Volume 3) #1 by Cary Nord

Publication information
- Publisher: Valiant Comics
- First appearance: X-O Manowar #1 (February 1992)
- Created by: Jim Shooter; Steve Englehart; Bob Layton; Barry Windsor-Smith

In-story information
- Alter ego: Aric of Dacia; Donovan Wylie
- Team affiliations: Orb Industries; Unity
- Abilities: X-O Armor/Shanhara •Enhanced strength, speed, reflexes, and healing process •Invulnerability •Flight •Scan cloaking •Energy manipulation •Constructs •Blasts •Absorption •X-Ray vision •Halted aging •Technopathy •Sensory arrays •Omnilinguism •Missiles •Teleportation •ESP
X-O Manowar
Publication information
- Schedule: Monthly
- Format: Ongoing
- Publication date: May 2012 – September 1996
- No. of issues: (Valiant Entertainment); 50 (2012), 26 (2017), 9(2020) (Acclaim Comics); 21 (Valiant Comics); 71

X-O Manowar (Aric of Dacia) is a fictional superhero co-created by writers Jim Shooter and Steve Englehart, and artists Bob Layton and Barry Windsor-Smith.

The eponymous comic book series published by Valiant Comics has sold more than 8 million copies to date. X-O Manowar has also starred in a video game alongside Marvel Comics's Iron Man. X-O Manowar comics have been translated into a number of languages including German, Italian, Spanish, Polish, Norwegian, Filipino, Chinese and Brazilian Portuguese.

== Publication history ==
=== Valiant Comics ===
X-O Manowar began as an original character by Valiant Comics with issue #1 with a cover date of February 1992. Less than a year after it began, with the Unity crossover and quality storytelling bringing attention to Valiant books, back issue prices rose dramatically due to limited early print runs. Significant praise was also given to the comic's characters, most notably Ken Clarkson, who became the first openly gay sidekick in comic books.

With comic book speculators buying multiple copies of each issue, sales reached as high as 800,000 copies for X-O Manowar #0 (August 1993) before dropping off. This original series ran for 68 issues before being canceled after the Sept. 1996 issue, of which only approximately 14,000 were printed. Issues #1–4 of the original X-O Manowar series were reprinted in a trade paperback, X-O Manowar: Retribution, which sold over 150,000 copies. Issues #7 and #8 were reprinted as part of the Unity Saga trade paperbacks.

=== Acclaim Comics era ===
In 1996, Acclaim Entertainment bought Valiant for $65 million and restarted the series under the Acclaim Comics banner. The publication of the second series ceased (along with all of Acclaim's non-core business) in 2002 due to Acclaim's financial difficulties in their video game division.

=== Valiant Entertainment ===
In April 2008, the recently formed Valiant Entertainment released X-O Manowar: Birth, a deluxe hardcover collection collecting the first seven issues of X-O Manowar. The collection was digitally recolored and "remastered" from the original material and included a new story, "The Rise of Lydia", by Bob Layton, one the title's original artists. A press release from Valiantfans.com stated:

X-O Manowar: Birth (FEB084088), published by Valiant Entertainment, is solicited in the February Previews (Volume XVIII #2) and scheduled to arrive in comic book stores nationwide on April 30, 2008. This digitally re-colored and re-mastered special edition collects the full X-O Manowar origin story from issues #0–6 for the first time ever, and includes an all-new epic "The Rise of Lydia" story by comics legend Bob Layton and a new cover by Sean Chen! Aric of Dacia is a Visigoth barbarian captured by spider aliens and enslaved aboard their starship until he steals their ultimate weapon – the X-O Manowar armor. Aric returns to Earth only to find that 1600 years have past. Now the most primitive man on the planet wields the most technologically advanced weapon in existence! Features explosive art by Barry Windsor-Smith and Marvel EIC Joe Quesada and a story by legendary creators Bob Layton and Jim Shooter! The book is a full-color 192 page deluxe hardcover edition with a suggested retail price of $24.95.

Valiant Entertainment began publishing new comics based on the Valiant Comics universe of characters in May 2012, starting with a new X-O Manowar series by writer Robert Venditti and artist Cary Nord. The first issue sold through its initial print run of 45,000 copies. Valiant released a second printing of the issue with a variant cover by artist Arutro Lozzi.

In January 2017, a new X-O series was released, created by Matt Kindt.

== Awards and recognition ==
- The A.V. Club named X-O Manowar the Best Revival of 2012.
- Ain't It Cool News named "X-O Manowar" Best Ongoing Series.
- Comic Book Therapy named X-O Manowar one of the 12 Best Comics of 2012.
- Comic Impact named X-O Manowar Most Improved Book 2012, and series writer Robert Venditti Best New Writer 2012.
- X-O Manowar was named among the "Top Twelve Titles of 2012" by Mind of Scott.
- Truthful Comics named X-O Manowar #7 to their list of the Top 10 Comics of 2012.
- Aric's battle against members of the Vine Members in X-O Manowar #5 was named among the Best New Comic Book Battles This Year: 2012 by Comic Vine, with an honorable mention given to Bloodshot and Chainsaw's battle.
- X-O Manowar was named "Best Comeback" in 2012 by Geekadelphia.
- X-O Manowar was named "Best New Series" in 2012 by Why So Blu.
- X-O Manowar was named in the Nerdage "Top Ten Comic-Book Series of 2012".

=== Nominations ===
- X-O Manowar was given the 2012 Diamond GEM Award for Best Book of the Year over $3.00.

== Fictional character biography ==
=== Characters ===
==== Shanhara (X-O Manowar Armor) ====
According to legend, the sentient X-O Manowar armor known as Shanhara grew from a secret plant eons ago on the alien empire's home world of Loa. During the Vine's persecution at the hands of a mysterious race known as the Torment, it bonded with its first Vine Host, who went on to use its might to single-handedly repel the invasion force and win freedom for his people. The armor is living, composed of organics and exotic metals—a mutualistic symbiote, bonded to its host. For centuries, the Vine high priests searched for a wearer that could bear the power of Shanhara, but all such candidates were killed in the process. When Aric of Dacia attempted to escape the Vine captivity, he bonded with Shanhara as a last resort and was deemed worthy.

Aric and Shanhara share a unique relationship—one that continues even when they are separated. Shanhara can translate foreign and alien languages, tap into a world's historical and geographical records, interface with complex forms of technology, and even heal life-threatening injuries and illnesses. Even though the bond between Aric and the armor is strong, it can be severed. Recently, the Harbinger Foundation teletechnopath Livewire was able to override the armor's connection to Aric and wear Shanhara for a limited period. Despite its impact on earthly affairs, the armor's true origin and purpose remain a mystery—one that the beings known as the Armor Hunters will soon expose.

=== Original Valiant Comics version ===
Aric of Dacia was a Visigoth born in the 5th century AD under Roman rule. As a young boy, Aric witnessed the slaughter of his parents at the hands of Roman soldiers. Henceforth, he dedicated himself to destroying the Roman oppressors, with the help of his Uncle, Alaric I.

Some years later, Aric took a Celtic slave, Deidre, to be his consort. He grew to love her, and worshipped her god, Lugh. One evening, he saw demons attacking members of his tribe. Aric attacked them, but was quickly subdued and taken aboard their alien spacecraft.

For the next seven years, Aric was held prisoner in the slave pens of the spacecraft. At a refuelling station several light years from Earth, he befriended a man known as the "Map Giver" who looked similar to Elvis Presley. The "Map Giver" used a discarded bone shard to carve a map into Aric's palm that would lead him to the alien's armory. Aric fought his way to the X-O Manowar class armor and donned the control ring. It later became clear that the "manufacturing" process of the X-O Manowar armor, which not only self-repaired, but also reproduced, involved the absorption of a sentient intelligence that then became the armor's own sentience. With this living armor he was able to escape from the alien ship and return to Earth.

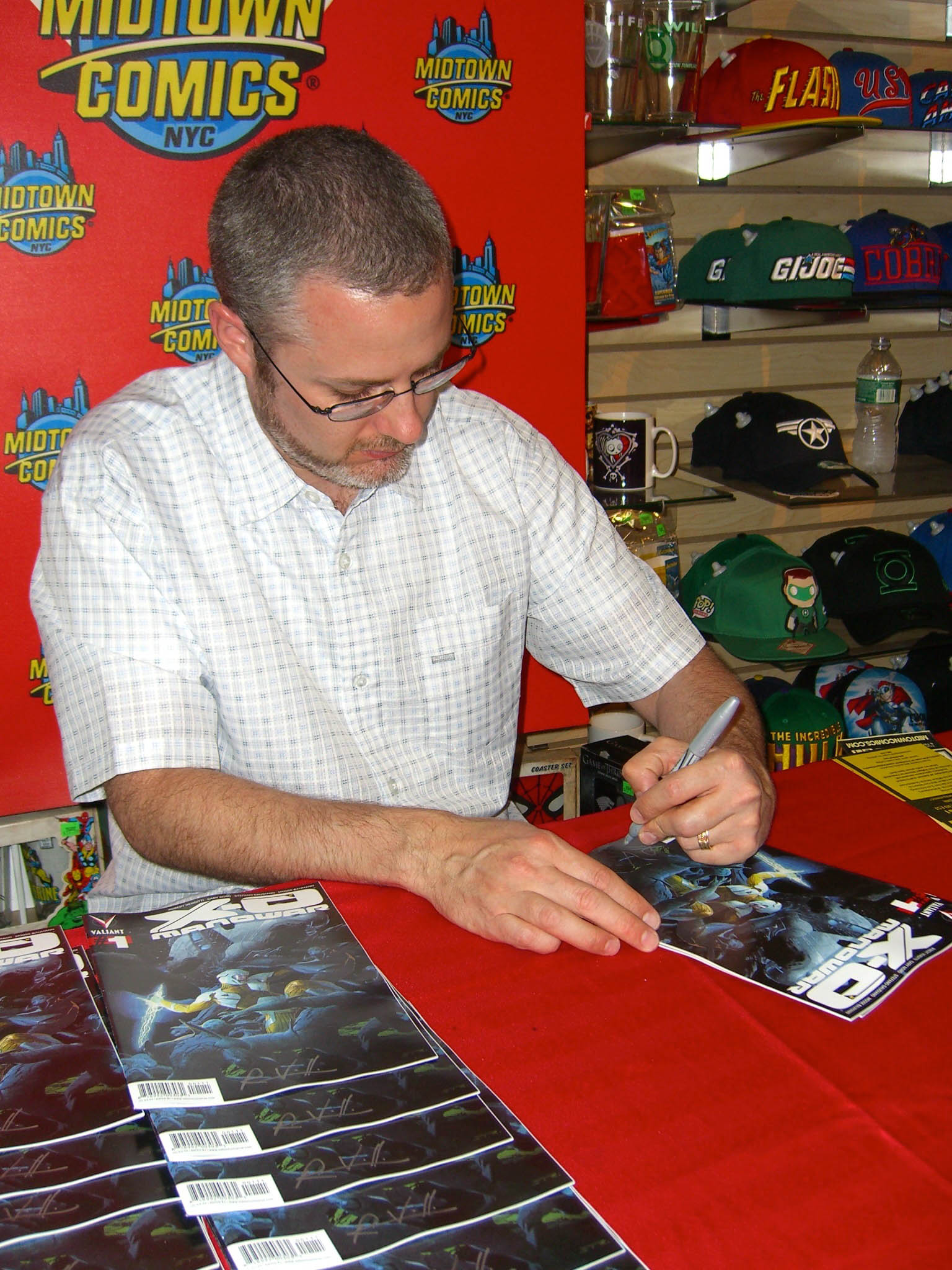
Writer Robert Venditti signing copies of Valiant Entertainment's debut issue of the series at a May 2, 2012 signing at Midtown Comics in Manhattan

Due to time dilation, as Aric had been traveling at the speed of light, although only a few years had passed on board, sixteen centuries had passed on Earth. Aric thus found himself in the unfamiliar world of the 20th century. At first, Aric struggled to adjust to late-20th-century Earth. He encountered a number of Valiant Universe heroes, befriending some and alienating others. He eventually gained control of Orb Industries, a multi-national corporation formerly controlled by the Spider Aliens.

X-O Manowar played a major role in Valiant's successful Unity crossover event. In this storyline, Aric chose not to help the other Valiant heroes defeat Mothergod (Erica Pierce), and instead built a small empire in the "lost land". Eventually, he was tricked by Mothergod and his people were slaughtered. Aric was eviscerated by a cyborg-tyrannosaurus and became trapped within the X-O Manowar armor for ten years to heal.

Aric and the X-O Manowar armor were sent back to Aric's own time by Solar at the end of Unity. Aric tried to convince his uncle, Alaric, to help him destroy the Romans. However, Alaric was concerned about the power that Aric had gained through the armor. Alaric and the Romans joined forces to fight Aric, but failed to defeat him.

In issue #28, the X-O Manowar armor (known as Shanhara) was destroyed. Solar went to Saturn to recover the armor left there, after defeating the alien he battled in Solar #7. This armor chose to remain with its deceased wearer, but had sprouted a seed, which Solar took. These seeds could be used to create a new Manowar armor, but only through the sacrifice of a sentient being. Aric's friend, Paul Bouvier, who was dying from spider alien poison, consented to be sacrificed so that Aric could continue his battles with the Spider Aliens.

In the X-O Manowar Yearbook, it was explained how Gilad Anni-Padda, the Eternal Warrior, earned the eternal enmity of Aric. Gilad was rescued from bandits by Aric, but he betrayed the location of Aric's Visigoth camp to Roman soldiers, whose attack led Deidre to miscarry Aric's child. However, Gilad had betrayed the Visigoths as part of a conspiracy that led to the downfall of the Roman Empire and the rise of Alaric.

=== Acclaim Comics version ===
When Acclaim Entertainment acquired the comic series, X-O Manowar was significantly altered. The character was now a modern-day scientist named Donovan Wylie who wielded X-O armor, an ancient artifact owned by the United States government, having been captured from Nazi Germany in World War II.

In this series, the X-O Manowar armor is an artifact of unknown origin that has been worn by a myriad of warriors throughout history. It essentially gives its wearer indefinite power, but the armor slowly siphons the life essence of its wearer, damaging their mind and body. The armor attaches itself to the wearer's nervous system and cannot be removed without killing the person wearing it. It can, however, be changed to its "metal" form at the wearer's will, but the metal is permanently grafted onto the wearer's chest (it is unknown if the armor will activate if grafted onto another part of the body).

=== Valiant Entertainment version ===
Born into battle, Aric of Dacia, heir to the throne of the Visigoth people, never knew peace. Raised under the oppressive thumb of the Roman Empire in 5th century Europe, his entire life was a never-ending series of campaigns against Rome, until a far more terrifying enemy came into play: the brutal race and alien colonizers known as the Vine. Abducted during a midnight scouting raid and taken to the far reaches of space, Aric and his fellow Visigoth captives lived their lives as slaves to the Vine, with no hope of escape.

After several years of captivity aboard a Vine colony ship, Aric led a revolt against his alien captors, storming the hallowed temple of the Vine and stealing their most powerful relic, Shanhara, the sentient X-O Manowar armor. Aric bonded with the armor—the first being in living memory to survive the process—and turned the Vine's most powerful weapon against them. But a crushing counterattack by the Vine left many of Aric's allies dead or dying. Inexperienced with the armor himself, Aric barely escaped the Vine fleet before rocketing back to Earth.

Upon his return, Aric learned that due to the effects of time dilation, 1,600 years have passed since his abduction and he was now stranded in the 21st century. Distraught by the loss of his family and people, Aric secluded himself in the Peruvian jungle, but the Vine were unwilling to leave their most sacred relic in human hands. Vine legend told that their greatest champion would one day wear the armor; news of a human controlling the suit could spell massive civil unrest for their empire.

To recover it, covert Vine agents called "plantings", left on Earth hundreds of years ago and modified to appear human, recruited the super-spy Ninjak to kill Aric and return the armor. But with the help of Alexander Dorian, Aric turned Ninjak against his alien masters and led an attack on the Vine's secret headquarters inside Britain's MI-6, virtually eliminating the plantings' operations in England.

The Vine responded with a full-force invasion, one that proved to be no match for the X-O Manowar armor. However, Aric realized that there would be no peace with the Vine until they were destroyed. Commandeering a Vine ship, Aric mounted a one-man invasion of the alien race's homeworld, Loam, toppling the empire and freeing thousands in the process, including a population of enslaved Visigoths descended from Aric's own people.

Returning to Earth with his new kinsmen in tow, Aric decided to reestablish an ancestral Visigoth homeland in its present-day location within Romania, a decision that quickly drew the ire of the neighboring Russian government. After warding off a series of coordinated military strikes, Aric was faced with his greatest threat yet, the super-team known as Unity.

Aric's defense of Dacia did not go to plan. He was beaten by Toyo Harada, stripped of his armor, and taken into custody by the United States Military Reconnaissance Outpost (M.E.R.O.), a covert government agency that monitors and engages alien threats. In exchange for asylum for him and his people, Aric, now reunited with the X-O Manowar armor, works as an agent of M.E.R.O., protecting American interests on and above the Earth.

== Collected editions ==
Title	Material collected	Published date	ISBN
Valiant Comics
X-O Manowar: Retribution	X-O Manowar (vol. 1) #1-4	January 1993	
X-O Manowar: Retribution (Valiant Classic Collection)	X-O Manowar (vol. 1) #0–9, X-O Database #1	June 2022	978-1682153987
Valiant Masters: X-O Manowar Vol. 1: Into the Fire	X-O Manowar (vol. 1) #0-6	September 2014	Amazon Kindle e-book digital release only
X-O Manowar: Birth	X-O Manowar (vol. 1) #0-6, X-O Manowar: The Rise of Lydia #1	April 2008	978-0979640919
X-O Manowar Classic Omnibus Volume 1	X-O Manowar (vol. 1) #0–30, Armorines #0, X-O Database #1, and material from Secrets of the Valiant Universe #1	January 2015	978-1939346308
Valiant Entertainment
X-O Manowar Vol. 1: By the Sword	X-O Manowar (vol. 3) #1–4	December 2012	978-0979640940
X-O Manowar Vol. 2: Enter Ninjak	X-O Manowar (vol. 3) #5–8	April 2013	978-1939346087
X-O Manowar Vol. 3: Planet Death	X-O Manowar (vol. 3) #9-14	September 2013	978-1939346087
X-O Manowar Vol. 4: Homecoming	X-O Manowar (vol. 3) #15-18	January 2014	978-1939346179
X-O Manowar Vol. 5: At War With Unity	X-O Manowar (vol. 3) #19-22	April 2014	978-1939346247
X-O Manowar Vol. 6: Prelude to Armor Hunters	X-O Manowar (vol. 3) #23-25	August 2014	978-1939346407
X-O Manowar Vol. 7: Armor Hunters	X-O Manowar (vol. 3) #26-29	January 2015	978-1939346476
X-O Manowar Vol. 8: Enter: Armorines	X-O Manowar (vol. 3) #30-32, 0	March 2015	978-1939346551
X-O Manowar Vol. 9: Dead Hand	X-O Manowar (vol. 3) #33-37	September 2015	978-1939346650
X-O Manowar Vol. 10: Exodus	X-O Manowar (vol. 3) #38-42	January 2016	978-1939346933
X-O Manowar Vol. 11: The Kill List	X-O Manowar (vol. 3) #43-46, X-O Manowar: Commander Trill #1, X-O Manowar 25th Anniversary Special #1	June 2016	978-1682151273
X-O Manowar Vol. 12: Long Live the King	X-O Manowar (vol. 3) #47-50	December 2016	978-1682151655
X-O Manowar Vol. 13: Succession and Other Tales	X-O Manowar 2016 Annual #1, Book of Death: The Fall of X-O Manowar #1, 4001 A.D.: X-O Manowar #1	January 2017	978-1682151778
X-O Manowar Deluxe Edition Book 1	X-O Manowar (vol. 3) #1–14	November 2013	978-1939346100
X-O Manowar Deluxe Edition Book 2	X-O Manowar (vol. 3) #15-22, Unity #1-4	April 2014	978-1939346520
X-O Manowar Deluxe Edition Book 3	X-O Manowar (vol. 3) #23-29, Armor Hunters #1-4	July 2016	978-1682151310
X-O Manowar Deluxe Edition Book 4	X-O Manowar (vol. 3) #30-42, 0, X-O Manowar 25th Anniversary Special #1	April 2017	978-1682151839
X-O Manowar Deluxe Edition Book 5	X-O Manowar (vol. 3) #43-50, X-O Manowar: Commander Trill #1, X-O Manowar 2016 Annual #1, Book of Death: The Fall of X-O Manowar #1, 4001 A.D.: X-O Manowar #1	August 2017	978-1682152157
X-O Manowar Vol. 1: Soldier	X-O Manowar (vol. 4) #1-3	July 2017	978-1682152058
X-O Manowar Vol. 2: General	X-O Manowar (vol. 4) #4-6	October 2017	978-1682152171
X-O Manowar Vol. 3: Emperor	X-O Manowar (vol. 4) #7-10	February 2018	978-1682152355
X-O Manowar Vol. 4: Visigoth	X-O Manowar (vol. 4) #11-14	June 2018	978-1682152638
X-O Manowar Vol. 5: Barbarians	X-O Manowar (vol. 4) #15-18	October 2018	978-1682152836
X-O Manowar Vol. 6: Agent	X-O Manowar (vol. 4) #19-22	February 2019	978-1682153079
X-O Manowar Vol. 7: Hero	X-O Manowar (vol. 4) #23-26	July 2019	978-1682153185
X-O Manowar by Matt Kindt Deluxe Edition Book 1	X-O Manowar (vol. 4) #1-14	April 2019	978-1682153116
X-O Manowar by Matt Kindt Deluxe Edition Book 2	X-O Manowar (vol. 4) #15-26	March 2020	978-1682153482
X-O Manowar Book 1	X-O Manowar (vol. 5) #1-4	June 2021	978-1682153680
X-O Manowar Book 2	X-O Manowar (vol. 5) #5-9	April 2022	978-1682153888
X-O Manowar by Dennis Hopeless Deluxe Edition	X-O Manowar (vol. 5) #1-9, Divintiy III: Aric, Son of the Revolution #1, Valiant 2020: The Year of Heroes FCBD Special, Valiant Uprising FCBD Special	March 2023	978-1682154380

== In other media ==
=== Film ===
In September 2016, newly formed Valiant Entertainment announced a feature film centered around Aric of Dacia / X-O Manowar. Executives of the company stated that there were notable directors attached to the project, and that the film will be true to the source material. By April 2020, John Cena teased his involvement with the film via his social media platforms.

=== Video game ===
X-O Manowar was featured along with Marvel Comics' armored superhero Iron Man in the Acclaim Entertainment-developed video game Iron Man and X-O Manowar in Heavy Metal, produced for IBM PC compatibles, PlayStation, Saturn, Game Gear, and Game Boy. In the game, X-O Manowar and Iron Man fight together against villains from both heroes' stories in order to stop them from obtaining all fragments of the Cosmic Cube.

=== Web series ===
X-O Manowar made an appearance in the web series Ninjak vs. the Valiant Universe, portrayed by Derek Theler.

=== Kindle World fan fiction stories ===
The X-O Manowar series has been augmented with fan or community content. Fan fiction publisher Kindle Worlds has been publishing stories that star Aric or exist within the X-O Manowar world:

- Noughts and Crosses, by Stuart Moore; June 2013.
- Aric the Younger, by L. Villarreal; August 2013.
- Centurion, by Brian LeTendre; August 2013.
- The Golden Circle, by Shane Berryhill; August 2013.
- Extinction (Part One), by Christopher Buckner; January 2014.
- Journey through Space, by Jon Mickus; February 2014.
- A Moment's Peace, by Richard Mark Perry III; April 2014.
- Superposition, by Will Carter III; June 2014.
