= Bob Layton =

American comic book artist, writer, and editor

- Layton at GalaxyCon San Jose in 2026
- Born: September 25, 1953 (age 73) Indianapolis, Indiana, U.S.
- Areas: Writer, Penciller, Inker, Editor
- Notable works: Iron Man, Hercules
- Awards: Inkwell Awards Joe Sinnott Hall of Fame (2020)

Bob Layton (born September 25, 1953) is an American comic book artist, writer, and editor. He is best known for his work on Marvel Comics titles such as Iron Man and Hercules, and for co-founding Valiant Comics with Jim Shooter.

== Early life ==
Bob Layton was born on September 25, 1953. He learned to read comics from the age of four, explaining that his "older sister Sue became bored with reading the same comic to me about fifty times. (It was a Showcase featuring the Challengers of the Unknown.)"

After leaving high school, Layton began "playing comics dealer ... selling them out of his apartment in Indianapolis," through which he met Roger Stern in 1973, while the latter was working for a radio station in Indianapolis.

== Career ==
=== CPL ===
Layton and Stern began publishing a fanzine called CPL (Contemporary Pictorial Literature) out of Layton's apartment.

Stern recalls that, "CPL started out as Bob's sale catalog. Bob was drawing the covers and including little reviews written by some of his customers. By issue #5, it turned into a small 'zine with a catalog insert, and I started writing short articles for it. I eventually became an editor of sorts."

CPL rapidly became a popular fan publication, and led to the two forming an alliance with Charlton Comics to produce and publish "the now-famous Charlton Bullseye magazine." During the mid-1970s, both Marvel and DC were publishing in-house "fan" publications (FOOM and The Amazing World of DC Comics respectively), and Charlton wished to make inroads into the superhero market, as well as "establish a fan presence", leading to the alliance with CPL to produce the Charlton Bullseye. This led to Charlton giving Layton and Stern "access to unpublished material from their vaults by the likes of Steve Ditko, Jeff Jones and a host of others." This association with Charlton (and Bill Pearson, production manager) in turn led to Layton becoming acquainted with Wally Wood, with whom he apprenticed. This apprenticeship led to work for Charlton on anthology titles, but not working from the Charlton offices, Marvel Comics and DC Comics, while still publishing fanzines.

=== Marvel Comics and DC Comics ===
Layton's first, albeit uncredited, work for Marvel Comics was inking a single page in the Marvel UK title The Avengers and the Savage Sword of Conan #135 (April 17, 1976).

Part of Layton's role as Wally Wood's apprentice included him occasionally delivering artwork to "NYC from Connecticut." Layton recalls that:

One day, I was in the Marvel offices ... handing in Woody's pages to the production dept. So, I used the opportunity to show my samples around while I had 'my foot in the door'. When I passed the art director's office, I heard John Romita on the phone, frantically trying to find someone to ink a desperately late issue of Iron Man [by George Tuska]. Like an idiot, I stuck my head in his doorway and said I could get the job done in the four or five days that was left on the schedule. It was an utter fabrication ... but I really wanted to work for Marvel Comics! Johnny gave me the pages and said, 'Show me what you can do, kiddo.'

Layton's reaction was one of panic, and his search for help to meet the deadline led him to Dick Giordano and Neal Adams' Continuity Associates where his "fledgling contemporaries," the Crusty Bunkers ("Terry Austin, Bob Wiacek, Joe Rubinstein, Bob McLeod, Joe Brozowski, Carl Potts and a host of others") were able to lend a hand and help him finish the book.

A month later, Layton received a package containing "an entire issue of pencils on the Champions", and discovered that he was "the new regular inker on the book." He worked for Marvel "for about a year, then signed an exclusive one-year contract with DC — after they made me 'an offer I couldn't refuse'."

Layton began work for DC Comics in early 1977, taking up regular inking duties on All Star Comics, as well as inking multiple issues of Secret Society of Super Villains, DC Super Stars, and DC Special, among others. In Nov./Dec. 1977, he inked the first issue of David Michelinie's Star Hunters, and after a number of other shorter inking jobs, moved back to Marvel in 1978, to ultimately take up one of his best remembered roles.

In 1978, Layton reunited with Michelinie, to co-write Iron Man. The two would become regular creative partners, and began their collaboration on Iron Man with #116 (November 1978). Micheline and Layton established Tony Stark's alcoholism with the story "Demon in a Bottle", and introduced several supporting characters, including Stark's bodyguard girlfriend Bethany Cabe; Stark's personal pilot and confidant James Rhodes, who later became the superhero War Machine; and rival industrialist Justin Hammer, who was revealed to be the employer of numerous high-tech armed enemies Iron Man fought over the years. The duo introduced the concept of Stark's specialized armors The two collaborated on the title until #154 and then returned for a second run from #215 (Feb. 1987) to #250 (Dec. 1989).

Layton continued to ink and work on covers for titles such as The Incredible Hulk, Captain America, Power Man and Iron Fist, and Micronauts. In September 1982, he launched one of Marvel's first limited series, writing and drawing the four-issue Hercules: Prince of Power. Its success spawned a four-issue sequel in 1984 and a 1988 graphic novel (#37 in the "Marvel Graphic Novel" series) - Full Circle. Around this time, he designed the highly successful Marvel Secret Wars toy line for Mattel, which formed the impetus behind the 1984 Secret Wars event. Layton was one of the inkers on The Amazing Spider-Man Annual #18 (1984) which featured the wedding of Spider-Man supporting characters J. Jonah Jameson and Marla Madison in a story written by Stan Lee. He was scheduled to work on a Spider-Man graphic novel with Paul Smith in late 1985, but it was never completed.

In February 1986, Layton revived the original X-Men characters in the series X-Factor, which he wrote and Jackson Guice drew. Layton wrote the first five issues before handing over the series to Louise Simonson. Michelinie and Layton became the creative team on Iron Man once again in issue #215 (Feb. 1987) They crafted the "Armor Wars" storyline which ran from #225 (Dec. 1987) through #231 (June 1988). After Michelinie and Layton finished their second Iron Man run with issue #250, Layton returned to the title briefly to write and draw #254 and write #256 before leaving Marvel. A year later, he returned to the comics industry to ink Jim Shooter's Magnus, Robot Fighter #1, from Valiant Comics.

=== Valiant Comics ===
Bob Layton was one of the chief architects of the Valiant Universe, along with Jim Shooter, Barry Windsor-Smith, Steven J. Massarsky, and Jon Hartz. He co-created a number of the core characters including X-O Manowar, and later became Editor-in-Chief and Senior Vice President, during which time he controlled the company during its most profitable period.

His first Valiant work appeared in Magnus, Robot Fighter #1 (May 1991), in which he inked Art Nichols' artwork from Jim Shooter's script. He would continue with Magnus for five issues and produce covers to issue #9, while inking the inaugural issues of Solar, Man of the Atom, which he edited. In February 1992, he co-created with Shooter and Steve Englehart and penciled the first issue of X-O Manowar, after which he handed over the core art duties to Sal Velluto, but provided inks for #2. The following month he drew the cover to David Michelinie's Rai.

In August 1992, he co-wrote, edited and inked Archer & Armstrong #1, edited and provided pencilwork on Eternal Warrior #1, and inked Barry Windsor-Smith on Unity #0. Starting in November 1992, he co-edited with Dark Horse publisher Mike Richardson the Predator/Magnus, Robot Fighter two-issue crossover, and in December was again inking and editing a Michelinie-written comic book series: H.A.R.D. Corps. Layton edited Turok, Dinosaur Hunter, Deathmate and Secret Weapons before writing the first of thirteen issues of The Second Life of Doctor Mirage. He was editing a vast array of titles during this time, for which he won the Editor of the Year award in 1993, as voted by the readers of the comics magazine, Wizard.

His workload decreased greatly towards the end of 1994, in large part due to the sale of Valiant (Voyager Communications, Inc.) to video game giant Acclaim Entertainment for US$65,000,000.00, a deal in which Layton played an instrumental part. His story concepts and design work on Turok, Dinosaur Hunter was utilized to great effect by Acclaim when the video game became the largest selling title in Acclaim's history, with over 1.5 million units sold. He continued to work editorially, largely for the new Acclaim imprint Armada Comics, for which he edited a number of Magic: The Gathering comics during 1995-96. He edited Bob Hall's four-issue Armed & Dangerous (April–July 1996), and returned to X-O Manowar for which he wrote the final three issues.

After a several-year association with Valiant/Acclaim, Layton moved to Florida for a short retirement. Although he found time to write the first eleven (of twelve) issues of Acclaim's Doctor Tomorrow between 1997 and 1998, inking a couple of issues, notably #6 which was drawn by Dick Giordano, who resided in Florida as well and was something of a mentor to Layton.

=== Return to DC and Marvel ===
In 1998, he returned to DC, re-teaming briefly with penciler Sal Velluto on a story in September 1998's The New Gods Secret Files and Origins, before collabotaring with his fellow Floridian and artistic friend/mentor Dick Giordano on several projects. The two-issue prestige format Elseworlds tale Batman: Dark Knight of the Round Table was co-drawn and co-inked by the both of them, from a script by Layton and debuted a month after their six-issue mini-series The L.A.W. (Living Assault Weapons), which ran from September 1999 to February 2000, with script and inks by Layton, and full pencils by Giordano. The two wrote a second Batman Elseworlds tale, Batman: Hollywood Knight a three-issue mini-series which told the story of a Serials-actor who became convinced he was The Batman. It was written by Layton with pencils and inks by Giordano.

Between Elseworlds, Layton worked with Marvel Comics on an Iron Man reunion, which saw him produce the four-part limited series Iron Man: Bad Blood with his long-term collaborator David Michelinie. The series ran from September to December 2000, with art by Layton and, as previously, the plot was a joint effort, and the final script by Michelinie. Layton then stayed at Marvel for a short time, teaming with Dan Jurgens as inker on Captain America (#38-50), as well as inking a short run on The Avengers (#44-47). He inked the Dan Jurgens-drawn The Power Company: Manhunter and part of Just Imagine Stan Lee ... Secret Files and Origins for DC in March 2002.

=== 2000s ===
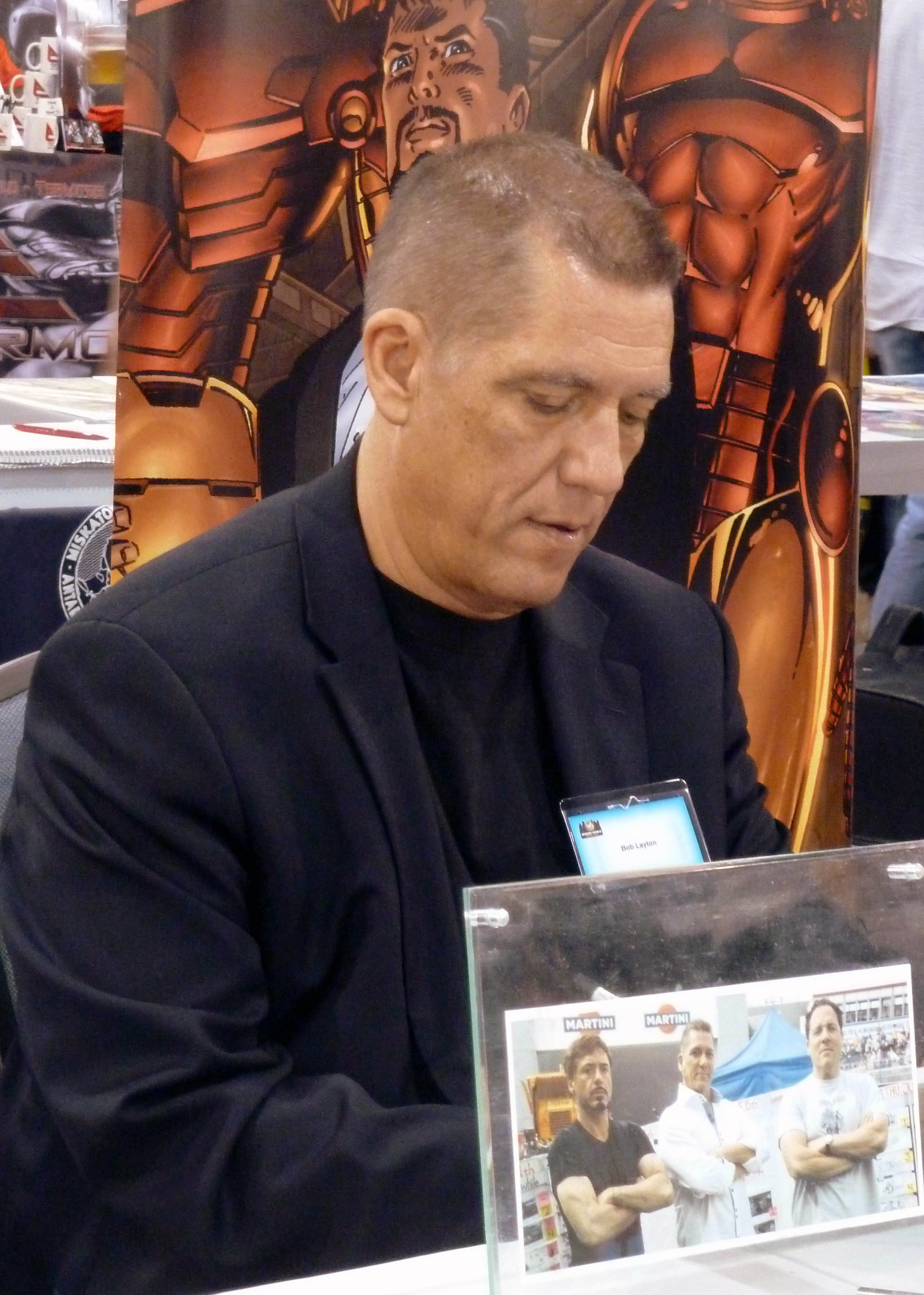
Layton in 2013

In December 2000, Layton launched Future Comics, with Dick Giordano, Allen Berrebbi, and David Michelinie. Layton acted as editor-in-chief, Berrebbi was CFO and director of marketing, Michelinie was head writer, Giordano was art director, and Skip Farrell was the publisher. Between 2000 and 2002, they prepared to revolutionize the direct market system by bypassing distributors and selling direct to customers and shops through the Internet.

In August 2002, Freemind #0 was released. Edited and inked by Layton, written by Layton and Michelinie, and with pencils by Giordano, it was followed by another title, Metallix, before the company bowed to pressure and signed with distributor Diamond Comics Distribution in an attempt to maximize sales while maintaining their independent approach. Ultimately, after three titles the third was Deathmask, and seventeen total issues, the company was not making enough money to survive, and it folded, with one announced title — Peacekeeper — unpublished.

Layton's work continues to be collected in multiple trade paperback collections. In 2006, he produced a number of variant covers to issues of Superverse Comics' Zoom Suit, written by John Taddeo, and in 2007 his work was featured in issues of Marvel's encyclopedic All-New Official Handbook of the Marvel Universe A to Z: Update. Layton worked for Marvel as a freelance artist and writer on several projects including the miniseries Iron Man: Legacy of Doom and Iron Man: The End.

He continues to enjoy doing commission work, writing:

How often do you, as an artist, get an opportunity to revisit a drawing and correct your mistakes? It's also a lot less work that doing a monthly, 22-page comic. And occasionally, the fans come up with some great concepts fore [sic] me to execute.

Layton has been quoted as saying that he "miss[es] telling stories," and to that end has showcased unpublished issues of Future Comics properties on his website, where he presented his serialized comic" Colony, with art by Giordano, and which "is a project that [Layton has] been developing for [over] 10 years and is currently making the rounds in Hollywood." As of 2007, other potential film deals for the Future Comics characters were reportedly semi-ongoing.

== Selected bibliography ==
Comics work includes:

=== DC Comics ===
- Adventure Comics #458 (1978)
- All Star Comics #66-72 (1977–1978)
- Batman Family #18-20 (Huntress) (1978)
- Batman: Dark Knight of the Round Table #1-2 (1998–1999)
- Batman: Hollywood Knight #1-3 (2001)
- Claw the Unconquered #9, 12 (1976–1978)
- DC Special #28-29 (1977)
- DC Super Stars #14, 16-18 (1977–1978)
- Hercules Unbound #9-10 (1977)
- House of Mystery #259, 287 (1978–1980)
- Just Imagine Stan Lee...Secret Files and Origins #1 (2002)
- L.A.W. (Living Assault Weapons) #1-6 (1999–2000)
- Legends of the DC Universe 80-Page Giant #2 (2000)
- New Gods Secret Files #1 (1998)
- Power Company Manhunter #1 (2002)
- Secret Society of Super Villains #6-8 (1977)
- Star Hunters #1-5 (1977–1978)
- Superboy #222, 233 (1976–1977)
- The Superman Family #182 (1977)
- The Unexpected #191 (1979)
- World's Finest Comics #251 (Green Arrow) (1978)

=== Marvel Comics ===
- The Amazing Spider-Man #240, 262, 277, 282-283, Annual #18 (1983–1986)
- The Avengers vol. 3 #44-47 (2001)
- Avengers Annual #16 (1987)
- Captain America vol. 3 #38-48, 50 (2001–2002)
- Champions #9, 11-13 (1976–1977)
- Ghost Rider #31 (1978)
- Hercules #1-4 (1982)
- Hercules vol. 2 #1-4 (1984)
- Hercules, Prince of Power: Full Circle graphic novel (1988)
- Heroes for Hope Starring the X-Men #1 (1985)
- Hulk vs. Hercules: When Titans Collide #1 (2008)
- The Incredible Hulk #230, Annual #7 (1978)
- Iron Man #91 (1976); #116-128, 130-135, 137-153 (1978–1981); #215-244, 246-250, 254, 256, Annual #9 (1987–1990)
- Iron Man vol. 3 #25 (2000)
- Iron Man: Bad Blood #1-4 (2000)
- Iron Man: Legacy of Doom #1-4 (2008)
- John Carter, Warlord of Mars #17 (1978)
- Marvel Comics Presents #11 (Ant-Man), 39-41 (Hercules) (1989–1990)
- Marvel Premiere #47-48 (Ant Man) (1979)
- Marvel Super-Heroes Secret Wars #4-5 (1984)
- Marvel Tales #197 (Hercules backup story) (1987)
- Marvel Treasury Edition #28 (Superman and Spider-Man) (1981)
- The Order #4 (2002)
- Rom #59, 72 (1984–1985)
- Shadows & Light #3 (1998)
- Solo Avengers #4, 7, 11 (1988)
- The Spectacular Spider-Man #130 (1987)
- Star Wars #78 (1983)
- The Thing #23 (1985)
- Thor #292, 356, Annual #14 (1980–1989)
- Web of Spider-Man #6, 28 (1985–1987)
- What If ... ? #33 (Iron Man) (1982)
- X-Factor #1-5, Annual #1 (1986)
- X-Men #105 (1977)

Preceded by Wally Wood	All Star Comics inker 1977–1978	Succeeded by Joe Giella
Preceded by Bill Mantlo	Iron Man writer 1978–1981 (with David Michelinie)	Succeeded by David Michelinie
Preceded by n/a	X-Factor writer 1986	Succeeded by Louise Simonson
Preceded by Danny Fingeroth	Iron Man writer 1987–1989 (with David Michelinie)	Succeeded by Dwayne McDuffie
Preceded by Art Thibert	Captain America vol. 3 inker 2001–2002	Succeeded by John Cassaday
