= Poison Ivy (character) =

DC Comics character

Pamela Isley Poison Ivy
- Variant cover of Batman (vol. 3) #26 (September 2017). Art by Joshua Middleton.

Publication information
- Publisher: DC Comics
- First appearance: Batman #181 (June 1966)
- Created by: Carmine Infantino; Robert Kanigher; Sheldon Moldoff

In-story information
- Alter ego: Pamela Lillian Isley
- Species: Metahuman
- Place of origin: Gotham City; Seattle
- Team affiliations: Injustice League; Legion of Doom; Injustice Gang; Suicide Squad; Justice League; Secret Society of Super Villains; Gotham City Sirens; Birds of Prey
- Partnerships: Harley Quinn; Catwoman; Madame Zodiac; Batman; Swamp Thing (various)
- Notable aliases: Dr. Pamela Isley; Lillian Rose; Dr. Paula Irving; Penelope Ivy; Poison Ice; Dr. Green; Queen Ivy
- Abilities: Doctorate in Botany; Manipulation of plants and toxins; Self-sustenance; Seduction; Skilled gymnast; Skilled hand-to-hand combatant

Poison Ivy is a character appearing in American comic books published by DC Comics. Created by artist Carmine Infantino and writers Sheldon Moldoff and Robert Kanigher, she debuted in Batman #181 (June 1966) and has become one of the superhero Batman's most enduring enemies belonging to the collective of adversaries that make up his rogues gallery.

In her comic book appearances, Poison Ivy is depicted as a doctor of botany-turned-misanthropic ecoterrorist in Gotham City named Pamela Lillian Isley, PhD (/ˈaɪzli/ EYEZ-lee) with the ability to control all plant life. Empowered by an elemental force known as the "Green", Ivy attempts to protect the sanctity and supremacy of nature at all costs by lashing out against humanity, which brings her into conflict with Batman. While usually portrayed as a supervillain, Ivy has also been an antiheroine at times as well as the primary love interest of Harley Quinn as of The New 52 and DC Rebirth relaunches. A one-piece costume adorned with leaves and vines serves as Poison Ivy's visual motif.

Poison Ivy has been adapted in various media incarnations, having been portrayed by Uma Thurman in the 1997 film Batman & Robin; Clare Foley, Maggie Geha and Peyton List in the Fox television series Gotham; and Bridget Regan in The CW's Arrowverse series Batwoman. Diane Pershing, Tasia Valenza, Lake Bell, Tara Strong, and others have provided the character's voice ranging from animation to video games.

== Publication history ==
Poison Ivy was initially created by Carmine Infantino as a design sketch. Robert Kanigher expanded her characterization in the script for her first appearance in Batman #181 (June 1966), giving her the identity of Lillian Rose. Infantino discussed how the character was created: "The only reason she came about was because of Catwoman on the Batman show. They wanted more female villains. What was the other one I did... the Silver Fox! And then Batgirl. That show, because of it we were selling a million copies a month. But that show, when it died, so did the comic books."

Poison Ivy's origin is depicted in Neil Gaiman's short story "Pavane" (Secret Origins #36, 1988), during which she declares herself to be nature's daughter and the world's rightful ruler; it is later revealed that her powers were given to her by the environmental force known as the Green. Ivy is considered extremely beautiful within the DC Universe, and is often presented as a temptress. She is typically depicted barefoot with long flowing hair, plant vines extending over her limbs, and a green one-piece suit adorned with leaves, with occasional variations to her skin tone.

Writer J. T. Krul, who helped further define Poison Ivy's personality, summed up her character with the following quote:

The thing I love most about Poison Ivy is her walking that line between bastion of Mother Nature and psycho Eco-terrorist. She sees herself as the hand of Mother Nature. If Mother Nature were "God," then Ivy would be her "Jesus." She defends the defenseless nature of the world and truly believes in her cause. Maiming, mauling, and mutilating are extreme measures, but it's nothing compared to what irredeemable cruelties humanity's done to the world of nature. Ivy always sees the greater good as she punishes those who deserve it.

— J. T. Krul

After appearing in various DC Comics publications, Poison Ivy starred in her first solo comic book series with the 2016 miniseries Poison Ivy: Cycle of Life and Death. This was followed by the 2021 graphic novel Poison Ivy: Thorns, and the eponymously titled Poison Ivy, an ongoing comic book series first published in 2022. The character also co-starred in the miniseries Harley Quinn and Poison Ivy (2019–2020).

== Fictional character biography ==
=== Pre-Crisis ===
Dr. Lillian Rose, PhD is a promising botanist who is persuaded by Marc LeGrand into assisting him with the theft of an Egyptian artifact containing ancient herbs. Fearing she would implicate him in the theft, he attempts to poison her with the herbs, which are deadly and untraceable. She survives this murder attempt and discovers she has acquired an immunity to all natural toxins and diseases.

=== Post-Crisis ===
Following the events of the DC maxi-series comic Crisis on Infinite Earths, which massively rebooted DC Universe history and continuity, Poison Ivy's origins were revised in Secret Origins #36, 1988, written by Neil Gaiman. Her real name is Dr. Pamela Isley, PhD, a Gotham City botanist. She grows up wealthy with emotionally distant parents and later studies advanced botanical biochemistry at a university with Alec Holland under Dr. Jason Woodrue. Isley, a shy girl, is easily seduced by her professor. Woodrue injects Isley with poisons and toxins as an experiment, causing her transformation. She nearly dies twice as a result of these poisonings, driving her insane. Later, Woodrue flees from the authorities leaving Isley in the hospital for six months. Enraged at the betrayal, she suffers from violent mood swings, being sweet one moment and evil the next. When her boyfriend has a car accident after mysteriously suffering from a massive fungal overgrowth, Isley drops out of school and leaves Seattle, eventually settling in Gotham City.

She begins her criminal career by threatening to release her suffocating spores into the air unless the city meets her demands. Batman, who appears in Gotham that very same year, thwarts her scheme, and she is incarcerated in Arkham Asylum. From this point on, she has a kind of obsession with Batman, him being the only person she could not control due to his strong will and focus. Over the years, she develops plant-like superpowers, the most noticeable being a lethal toxin in her lips; she is literally able to kill with a kiss.

In subsequent issues, she states that she only started a life of crime to attain sufficient funds to find a location to be alone with her plants, undisturbed by humanity. A few years later, she attempts to leave Gotham forever, escaping Arkham to settle on a desert island in the Caribbean. She transforms the barren wasteland into a second Eden, and is, for the first time in her life, happy. It is soon firebombed, however, when an American-owned corporation tests their weapons systems out on what they think is an abandoned island. Ivy returns to Gotham with a vengeance, punishing those responsible. After being willingly apprehended by Batman, she resolves that she can never leave Gotham, at least not until the world was safe for plants. From then on, she dedicates herself to the impossible mission of "purifying" Gotham.

At one point, Batman travels to Seattle to ascertain information on Pamela Isley's life before she became Poison Ivy. Here, Batman states that both of Pamela's parents are dead. When and why they died has been left undetermined.

While in Arkham, Poison Ivy receives a message through flowers that someone is to help her escape. That night, two women, Holly and Eva, successfully break Ivy out and bring her back to their employer. She is less than happy to discover that it is the Floronic Man, formerly known as Dr. Jason Woodrue, her former college professor that conducted the experiments on her. The only human portion of him remaining is his head, while the rest of his body is plant-based.

After striking a deal with him in the tunnels of Gotham, Ivy receives a trunk full of money in return for samples of her DNA. Woodrue intends to combine their DNA to create a "child", all while flooding the streets of Gotham with high-grade marijuana. The purpose of this is to create a world economy run on hemp and to have their offspring control it. Batman intervenes, but is overcome by Woodrue's henchwomen, Holly and Eva. However, Ivy turns on Floronic Man and lets Batman go to fight the intoxicated maniac. In the end, Batman decapitates the Floronic Man, and Ivy escapes with her money.

At times, Ivy demonstrates positive and maternal traits. When Gotham City is destroyed in an earthquake and declared No Man's Land, she holds dominion over Robinson Park and turns it into a tropical paradise rather than fight over territory like most of Batman's enemies. Sixteen children who are orphaned during the quake come to live with her as she sympathizes with them having suffered a traumatic childhood herself. She cares for them like sons and daughters, despite her usual misanthropy. That winter, Clayface (Basil Karlo) pays Ivy a visit, hoping to form a bargain with her. This would entail her growing fruits and vegetables, having the orphans harvest them, and him selling the produce to the highest bidder. She wants nothing to do with the plan, and she attempts to kill him with a kiss. Clayface overpowers her, however, and imprisons Ivy and the orphans for six months in a chamber under the park's lake. He feeds her salt and keeps her from the sun to weaken her. Eventually, Batman comes and discovers the imprisoned orphans and Ivy. The two agree to work together to take Karlo down. Batman battles Clayface and instructs Robin to blow up the lake bed above, allowing the rushing water to break apart the mud, effectively freeing Ivy. She fights Karlo, ensnaring him in the branches of a tree and fatally kissing him. She then proceeds to sink him down into the ground, where he becomes fertilizer for Ivy's plants. Batman, originally intending to take the orphans away from Ivy, recognizes that staying with her is what is best for them, and they remain in her care until the city is restored. Also, as part of a bargain to keep her freedom, Batman arranges it so that Ivy provides fresh produce to the starving hordes of earthquake survivors. Soon after, Ivy finds Harley Quinn, who had almost been murdered by the Joker, among the debris of the earthquake and nurses her back to health. The two have been best friends and partners-in-crime ever since.

After Gotham City is reopened to the public, the city council wants to evict her from the park and send her back to Arkham Asylum, as they are uncomfortable with the thought of a "psychotic eco-terrorist controlling the equivalent of 30-odd square blocks." They also mistakenly believe that the orphans in Ivy's care are hostages. The Gotham City Police Department threaten to spray the park with R.C. Sixty, a powerful herbicide that most certainly would have killed every living plant in the park, including Ivy, and more than likely do harm to the children. Ivy refuses to leave the park to the city and let them destroy the paradise she had created, so she chooses martyrdom. It is only after Rose, one of the orphans, is accidentally poisoned by Ivy that the hardened eco-terrorist surrenders herself to the authorities to save the girl's life. Batman says that, as much as she would hate to admit it, Ivy is still more human than plant.

Later on, she and other Gotham characters are manipulated by the Riddler and Hush. Her task is to hypnotize both Superman and Catwoman, using Catwoman to steal ransom money from Bane after the original plan is interrupted by Batman while Superman serves as a 'bodyguard' when she hides in Metropolis. However, she abandons Catwoman to be killed by Killer Croc, and Batman is able to keep Superman busy in a fight (aided by the kryptonite ring he was given long ago) long enough for him to escape Ivy's control. Soon afterwards, the Riddler, who is being chased and attacked by Hush, approaches Ivy and seeks her protection. Ivy, who is angered by the manipulation, battles the Riddler physically and psychologically. She comes to physically dominate her opponent, humiliating Riddler and temporarily breaking his spirit.

Ivy comes to believe that her powers are killing the children she had looked after, so with Bruce Wayne's help, she willingly undergoes treatment to become human again. Soon after, she is convinced by Hush to take another serum to restore her powers and apparently dies in the process. However, in Batman: Gotham Knights, when her grave is visited shortly thereafter, it is covered with ivy, creating the impression her death would be short-lived.

Shortly after, Poison Ivy appears briefly in Robinson Park, killing two corrupt cops who killed one of her orphans (although whether this takes place before or after the aforementioned storyline is unknown).

"One Year Later", Ivy is alive and active. Her control over flora has increased, referred to as being on a par with Swamp Thing or Floronic Man. She also appears to have resumed her crusade against the corporate enemies of the environment with a new fanaticism, regarding Batman no longer as a main opponent, but as a "hindrance". After arriving back from a year-long absence, Batman discovers that Ivy has been feeding people including "tiresome lovers", "incompetent henchmen", and those who "returned her smile" to a giant plant which would digest the victims slowly and painfully. She refers to these murders as a "guilty pleasure". In an unprecedented event, her victims' souls merge with the plant, creating a botanical monster called Harvest, who seeks revenge upon Poison Ivy. With the intervention of Batman however, she is saved. Poison Ivy is left in critical condition, and the whereabouts of Harvest are unknown.

=== Other storylines ===
In Countdown #37, Pied Piper and Trickster are hiding out in a greenhouse, picking fruits and vegetables from the plants. They run into Ivy, who is talking to her plants (presumably being told that Piper and Trickster hurt them), to which she reacts by tying them up in vines with the intention of killing them. She is then shown to have joined the Injustice League Unlimited and is one of the villains featured in Salvation Run.

In the "Battle for the Cowl" storyline, she is coerced by a new Black Mask into joining his group of villains that aims to take over Gotham. She and Killer Croc unsuccessfully attempt to murder Damian Wayne.

Shortly after, she escapes from Black Mask's control and forms an alliance with Catwoman and Harley Quinn, leading into the ongoing series Gotham City Sirens.

During Hush's ploy to hurt Batman through hurting his loved ones, Hush kidnaps Catwoman and surgically removes her heart. After being saved by Batman, Catwoman is operated on by some of the most gifted surgeons in the world, including Doctor Mid-Nite and Mr. Terrific. Zatanna also gives her a magic antidote to help heal her wounds. To get even with Hush, Selina enlists the help of Poison Ivy, Harley Quinn, Oracle, Holly Robinson, and Slam Bradley to track down all of Hush's accounts, pilfer them, and leave him penniless. Selina pays Holly, Harley, and Ivy over $30 million each, hoping that they would use the funds to leave Gotham to start fresh somewhere else. However, Harley uses her money to go on a shopping spree, while Ivy gives her money away to organizations in Madagascar and Costa Rica dedicated to reforestation.

After rescuing Catwoman from Boneblaster, a new villain trying to make a name for himself, Poison Ivy takes Catwoman back to the Riddler's townhouse. When there, Catwoman sees that Ivy has been keeping the Riddler under mind control so that she and Harley could use his townhouse as a hideout. Here, Catwoman decides that with Gotham City more dangerous than ever with all the gang wars and a new Batman, a partnership with the other two women would be advantageous. However, Ivy fears that Catwoman has lost her edge and prowess, and consults with Zatanna on the nature of Catwoman's injuries. Zatanna responds that Catwoman has psychological wounds that would need healing. Ivy resolves that she and Harley would provide Catwoman with "positive female reinforcement". The three then agree to become a team. However, Harley and Ivy have one condition that Catwoman is to reveal to them Batman's secret identity.

Eventually, Ivy and the other Sirens ambush the Riddler at his office (with Ivy using her plants to truss and gag his secretary), telling him that they've been framed for the murder of a young nurse. He agrees to help clear their names, and during the discussion Ivy reveals that she has recently taken up a job at the Gotham division of S.T.A.R. Labs under the alias Paula Irving. She is eventually kidnapped and placed in a specialized containment unit by a researcher named Alisa Adams, but escapes and turns the table on her captor by binding her with vines. Ivy initially informs Adams that she plans to kill her, but instead decides to let her live after seeing a photograph of Alisa's young daughter. Ivy then threatens Alisa into keeping her mouth shut about her true identity, telling her that she will change her mind and kill her if she reveals her secret to anyone.

When Harley Quinn betrays her friends and breaks into Arkham Asylum with the goal of killing the Joker, she ultimately chooses instead to release Joker from his cell, and together the two orchestrate a violent takeover of the facility. Poison Ivy arrives and tries to convince Harley Quinn that the Joker is evil, but Harley Quinn refuses to believe her and knocks Poison Ivy unconscious. After they are defeated by Catwoman and Batman, Catwoman then tells Poison Ivy that they are no longer friends, after Ivy had drugged Catwoman in an attempt to discover Batman's identity. Poison Ivy is taken to Arkham Asylum. Ivy soon escapes and ambushes Harley in her cell, binding and gagging her former friend before she can defend herself. Ivy struggles with the decision to execute Harley for her betrayal, but ultimately releases her after realizing that she is still her friend. Together, the two set off to find Catwoman and make her pay for leaving them behind. The two of them find Catwoman and fight her on the streets. While fighting, Catwoman confesses that she saw good in the both of them and only wanted to help them. When she tells them that she only kept tabs on them because Batman wanted to keep them under control, Ivy lashes out onto the city by using giant vines to destroy buildings, cursing at Batman for manipulating her. Batman is about to arrest them, but Catwoman helps the two of them escape.

=== The New 52 ===
In 2011, "The New 52" rebooted the DC universe. Poison Ivy is recruited into the covert-ops group known as the Birds of Prey. Though she is specifically hand-picked by the team's leader, Black Canary, the other members of the group protest Ivy's inclusion, citing her violent past and connections to various murders. These suspicions are proven correct when Ivy poisons the team and forces them to attack corrupt companies she wants to destroy, until Katana apparently kills her.

Ivy survives the injuries and returns to Gotham, breaking out Clayface/Basil Karlo to manipulate him into becoming her husband. Batman intervenes to help her, mainly because the locations she attacked were the Penguin's properties. Poison Ivy ends up captured by Penguin's men. She is buried alive by them, but survives long enough to be rescued by Penguin's right-hand man Emperor Penguin who has taken over his boss' businesses after the Joker's return. He proposes an alliance with her. However, Karlo, whom Batman had set free from Ivy's control, tracks down and attacks Poison Ivy. Emperor Penguin later calls in a favor from Poison Ivy. This led to Emperor Penguin empowering himself with a chemical that is made from one of Poison Ivy's botanical concoctions, the Man-Bat Serum, and the Venom drug.

The character's origin, in this new DC universe, was presented in a special issue of Detective Comics (#23.1), during the "Villains Month" event in September 2013. Pamela Isley was born with a skin condition that prevented her from leaving her home. She spent most of her limited time outside in her family's garden. Her abusive father murdered her mother and buried her in the garden. While in college, Pamela sold pheromone pills to other students to study its effects until she was caught by police. She used a powerful version of the pills to control the dean's mind so he would drop the charges and let her graduate with honors. While visiting her father in prison, she kissed him, and the poison that was secreted from her lips killed him. Later she landed an internship in Wayne Enterprises' Bio-Chemistry Division developing pharmaceutical and cosmetic applications. She was fired after Bruce Wayne discovered her using company resources for an unauthorized project to brainwash people through plant pheromones. In an accident similar to that which created Mr. Freeze, Pamela attacks the security guards sent to escort her out and is exposed to lethal doses of her chemicals, triggering a mutation that gives her green skin, immunity to all toxins, and the ability to manipulate plant life.

=== Cycle of Life and Death ===
Poison Ivy as Dr. Pamela Isley, PhD in Poison Ivy: Cycle of Life and Death #1 (March 2016). Art by Clay Mann and Seth Mann.

In January 2016, DC Comics debuted Ivy's first solo comic book series, Poison Ivy: Cycle of Life and Death. The series begins with Ivy attempting to go straight by returning to her science career. Under her human identity of Dr. Pamela Isley, she joins the plant sciences department at the famed Gotham Botanical Gardens, but things quickly get complicated when Luisa Cruz, Ivy's friend and mentor, is murdered via poisoning. Ivy investigates the murder whilst completing a genetic engineering research project begun by Cruz that culminates in the creation of two plant-human hybrid children known as Rose and Hazel.

With the help of Selina Kyle and fellow researcher Darshan, Poison Ivy finds that the Gotham Botanical Gardens are performing experiments, using Ivy's research, which result in the creation of another plant-human hybrid child known as Thorn. Ivy destroys the laboratory and rescues the child. Ivy raises Rose, Hazel and Thorn who grow to adult size at an exponential rate, becoming young women within 35 weeks. When the girls sneak out to see Gotham City at night for the first time, they cause an incident at a strip club that gets the police involved, and Ivy has to help them escape.

Returning to the apartment, Ivy locks Rose, Hazel and Thorn away so they will not leave again. Ivy finds Doctor Eric Grimley, Chair of the Gotham Botanical Gardens Research Department, waiting for her. Grimley had been conducting experiments with Ivy's research to cure his own cancer; he had then murdered Luisa because she was suspicious of the experiments he was performing. Now, with his cancer returning, he intends to harvest Rose, Thorn, and Hazel for spores to be used as another cure. He attacks Ivy, and transforms into a giant, plant-like monster. Darshan arrives and releases the girls. Ivy, Rose, Hazel, Thorn, and Darshan, along with Swamp Thing (who seeks to kill Grimley for trying to break the cycle of life and death) fight and defeat Grimley, with Thorn hacking him up with a machete.

Darshan later helps Rose, Thorn, and Hazel leave Ivy, reasoning that they were getting so restless they would go eventually with or without his help. They set off away from Gotham to places unknown, saying they plan to live out their lives regardless of how short they may be.

=== DC Universe ===
DC Comics began the next relaunch of its entire line of titles, called "DC Rebirth", in June 2016. DC opted to rebrand its titles under the "DC Universe" name in December 2017, using the continuity established from DC Rebirth. In the "Better Together" story arc of Trinity, Poison Ivy finds a dreamworld and the White Mercy entity, both created by the Black Mercy plant for Mongul, through her connection to the Green. After capturing Batman, Wonder Woman, and Superman, she places them into the dreamworld and intends to use the solar energy emitted from Superman's body to open a gateway to bring the White Mercy—whom she considers as a daughter—over from the dreamworld. It is later revealed that Mongul deceived Poison Ivy and intended to conquer Earth using Superman as a vessel. Mongul is defeated by the White Mercy, using Batman as a temporary and willing vessel. As Poison Ivy and the White Mercy bid farewell to each other, the White Mercy uses her connection to the Green to make Poison Ivy lose her memories of the incident, so Ivy does not need to suffer any heartache. In the continuity, the "Better Together" story arc takes place after the events in Poison Ivy: Cycle of Life and Death involving Ivy's children.

In Batgirl, Poison Ivy helps Batgirl save an airplane and its passengers from a plant, one of Ivy's specimen, that is growing uncontrollably in the cargo bay. In the end, she reluctantly allows Batgirl to kill it.

In the "Ends of the Earth" arc of All-Star Batman, Poison Ivy goes into Death Valley where she conducts research on a barren tree to discover cures. Here, Batman asks Poison Ivy for help with a deadly bacterium, which was unleashed by Mr. Freeze, informing her about an infected girl and giving her samples of it. Upon examining it, Ivy realizes that the infected girl is already dead and Batman wanted to evoke her sympathy as he is actually seeking for a cure to combat the spread of the disease. She also reveals that, when she was still working at Wayne Enterprises, she had presented her research wrongly as she thought Bruce Wayne wanted something to manipulate people but she was actually researching pheromones to make people feel good. Batman warns Ivy that an unknown strike force is after her, because they know Ivy is able to pull biological weapons from the tree. After Batman helps Ivy in the fight, Ivy synthesizes a selective agent that can destroy the spores without harming the hosts.

In "The War of Jokes and Riddles" story arc of Batman, Poison Ivy has allied herself with the Riddler in his war against the Joker. In the arc, when the Riddler was trying to convince her to join his side, she is seen stopping Carmine Falcone's men—who are sent to kill the Riddler—by capturing them in vines.

In the "Gotham Resistance" tie-in story arc for Dark Nights: Metal, Poison Ivy controls a jungle-like realm within a Gotham City warped by the dark energy emitted from the dark metal in the cards given by the Batman Who Laughs to various enemies of Batman including Poison Ivy herself. Poison Ivy captures Harley Quinn—who realizes that Poison Ivy is not herself—Green Arrow, Nightwing, Robin, and Killer Croc as they try to solve what is going on and stop it. They escape when Poison Ivy violently reacts to her plants being harmed during an attack by several members of the Teen Titans and Suicide Squad, who all also have been twisted, as well as a Dark Robin.

In the "Source Code" story arc of Batgirl and the Birds of Prey, Poison Ivy infiltrates and tries to take down Terracare, a company whose fertilizers contain a secret ingredient destructive to bee populations. She comes across the Birds of Prey (Huntress, Black Canary, and Batgirl) and Catwoman who were trying to save the Calculator's family held hostage by Terracare. Terracare had namely traced back a data breach to the Calculator who sold the information to Catwoman, so she could steal a vial of the ingredient from Terracare for Poison Ivy. She did this for Ivy, as Ivy once saved her from Boneblaster. After they stopped those responsible at Terracare, Batgirl arranges that Poison Ivy becomes the chemist in charge of the fertilizers. After this arc, Poison Ivy is occasionally seen working at Terracare (now acquired by Gordon Clean Energy) or helping the Birds of Prey against villains (such as the Daughters of Gotham or the Calculator).

In the "Unnatural Disaster" storyline of Damage, Poison Ivy has fallen under the influence of forces that led to a desire to destroy humanity. She partnered with Gorilla Grodd for that purpose. They fought against Damage (Ethan Avery) who is trying to protect people from them. However, Poison Ivy eventually resists the control of these forces, as she thinks that people are worth saving and does not want to be a killer. At the end, Swamp Thing (Alec Holland) reveals to Ethan Avery that the Green is trying to change Poison Ivy but has not succeeded.

Batman (vol. 3) #41–43 features a Poison Ivy arc titled "Everyone Loves Ivy". Fueled by her guilt over the men she thought she killed in "The War of Jokes and Riddles", Poison Ivy uses her powers to take control of everyone on earth, except Batman and Catwoman. With the help of Harley Quinn, Batman and Catwoman convince Poison Ivy to release the world from her control. At the end of arc, Poison Ivy enters a facility known as the Sanctuary for rehabilitation.

In Heroes in Crisis, at the mental health institution Sanctuary, Poison Ivy is seen giving a confession in which she states that she should not be there because they are made for heroes and she is a terrorist. Earlier, Harley Quinn had told Poison Ivy to go to Sanctuary and followed her there. Ivy and several others are killed when Wally West loses control of the Speed Force, but Wally revives Ivy from the Green by using the Speed Force on a rose that was a part of Ivy given to Harley. The following Harley Quinn and Poison Ivy limited series shows Ivy still struggling to completely regenerate. With Harley's aid, Ivy is eventually restored fully, but accidentally creates an identical plant duplicate of herself during her recovery. Both innocently unaware of being a duplicate, the Ivy-double and Harley go on the run together when enemies attack, leaving behind the real Ivy feeling abandoned and betrayed. By the time the pair learn of their mistake, Ivy is murderously insane towards Harley, forcing the double to sacrifice herself to save Harley and stabilize Ivy's sanity.

=== Harley Quinn comic ===
Harley Quinn features Ivy as Harley's best friend and then lover. Ivy has helped Harley out on several adventures between her ecological terrorism gigs back in Harley's new home on Coney Island. She helps Harley explain to the local assassins that Harley posted her own bounty while sleepwalking and that trying to kill her would just lead to their deaths and no pay day. Harley rescued her from a super villain's mind control while Ivy was secretly held prisoner and used by said villain in Arkham. She assisted in hiring the Gang of Harleys and nursing Harley back to health when Captain Strong's seaweed put her in the hospital. She and Catwoman joined Harley on a road trip when Harley's uncle died and found that while both she and Harley are immune to most toxins, that does not include some secret drink brewed up on an Indian reservation. She and Harley were invited to spend a romantic week in Bermuda on a nudist colony by Sy Borgman. When there was a dispute over some real estate Ivy helped turn it into protected swampland. Also, when the Penguin attacks New York with giant killer penguins, she helps defeat him by growing a giant daisy in what their friend Eggy calls "the worst Kaiju fight ever."

Tee Franklin, one of the writers of the Harley Quinn comics, has stated that she wrote Ivy as autistic, but "figured DC would be against" this being mentioned in the comics.

=== Solo series ===
In the solo series Poison Ivy, Ivy is elected mayor of Gotham City. Vandal Savage becomes Gotham City's police commissioner and begins working with Ivy and the newly-created unit TUCO (Tactical Urban Combat Officers) against Batman. In the subsequent storyline "Bad Seeds", Savage turns against Ivy, leading to a conflict between them and against Batman. After Ivy has her powers taken away by the Parliament of Trees, Savage takes over her position as acting mayor until he is apparently killed by Killer Croc.

== Collected issues ==
Title	ISBN	Release date	Story by	Art by	Collected issues
Poison Ivy: Cycle of Life and Death	9781401264512	September 7, 2016	Amy Chu	Clay Mann	Poison Ivy: Cycle of Life and Death #1-6
Harley & Ivy Meet Betty & Veronica	9781401280338	August 29, 2018	Marc Andreyko; Paul Dini	Laura Braga	Harley & Ivy Meet Betty & Veronica #1-6
Poison Ivy Vol. 1: The Virtuous Cycle	9781779518491	May 23, 2023	G. Willow Wilson	Marcio Takara	Poison Ivy #1–6
Poison Ivy Vol. 2: Unethical Consumption	9781779523303	November 21, 2023	G. Willow Wilson	Atagun Ilhan	Poison Ivy #7–12
Poison Ivy Vol. 3: Mourning Sickness	9781779529411	September 24, 2024	G. Willow Wilson	Marcio Takara	Poison Ivy #13–18
Poison Ivy Vol. 4: Origin of Species	9781779528438	December 03, 2024	G. Willow Wilson	Marcio Takara	Poison Ivy #19–24
Poison Ivy Vol. 5: Human Botany	9781799502050	July 08, 2025	G. Willow Wilson	Marcio Takara	Poison Ivy #25–30
Poison Ivy Vol. 6: A Death in Marshview	9781799502579	January 13, 2026	G. Willow Wilson	Marcio Takara	Poison Ivy #31–37

== Other publications ==
- Poison Ivy: Cast Shadows, a 2004 DC Comics one-shot
- Poison Ivy: Thorns, a 2021 DC Comics graphic novel

== Activism ==
Ivy calls herself an "ecoterrorist of global importance" and has demonstrated philanthropic contributions to conservation efforts. The Gotham Girls episode "Pave Paradise" has her going out of her way to get Gotham's mayor to prevent bulldozing of a park because he swore he would not do it in his election campaign. In Gotham City Sirens, Ivy reveals that she donated her $30 million share of Hush's money to a reforestation fund.

== Powers and abilities ==
Initially thought to have been transformed by human experiments, Isley is later revealed to be gifted by the Green, an interplanetary force which grants her a supernatural control over plant life, enhanced strength and stamina, the power to transfer poison through touch, complete immunity to all toxins and poisons, and the ability to project mind-controlling pheromones. With the latter power at its full potential, she proves capable of controlling every person on Earth, including other super-powered beings. If her mind-control spores are laced with kryptonite, Ivy can affect and control Superman as well.

She has the ability to control and mutate all forms of plant life on a molecular level, making it respond to her will and command. In volume three of Batman, she causes giant plant roots to become uprooted at a moment's notice, and directs them to entangle her enemies. While in Arkham Asylum, she manipulates and animates plants, using roots to form supports for a tunnel she and another inmate named Magpie dig to escape, and also spawning glowing fungi to entertain Magpie. Plant vines are also commonly seen extending over her limbs and neck, creating part of her overall appearance. She controlled an entire tree to come down on Clayface, ensnaring him in its branches, and once brought a whole skyscraper down with giant vines.

Some versions of the character depict her as more plant than human, such as breathing carbon dioxide and undergoing photosynthesis. Her special pheromones let her mesmerize and manipulate people around her, men in particular, although strong-minded people like Batman are usually capable of resisting. She can also create the most potent floral toxins in Gotham City, ranging from truth serums to love potions. Often these toxins are secreted from her lips and administered in her preferred way, a poisonous kiss. Ironically her immunity to poisons has resulted in her becoming sterile and unable to give birth.

Poison Ivy is identified by the Swamp Thing as a being with an elemental mystical component, whom he calls the "May Queen". Ivy is able to communicate over great distances with this talent, as she manifests in a vase of roses in Zatanna's dressing room to talk to the magician. Since her death and rebirth, her control over plants increased to the point she can grow giant animated plants from seedlings in seconds, hear through plants, and channel her consciousness into plant material from long distances.

The character carries a certain number of live vines: coupled with her natural ability to commune with plant life, they act as weaponry, or defensive/grabbing appendages. Their supply is, however, limited.

Beyond her metahuman traits, Ivy is shown to be exceptionally physically fit both due to gymnastics and her enhanced health; being similar to Harley Quinn in skill as well as showing enough hand-to-hand combat prowess to challenge Batman without relying solely on her powers.

Pamela Isley is an expert in botany, toxicology and genetics. Though mentally unstable, she has a genius level of intelligence, particularly when it comes to anything related to plants, and she may be the world's foremost botanist. Her specialization in these fields had earned her a career as a scientist and she initially used her knowledge for perfumes, makeup and medicine. Additionally, her expertise in biochemistry has enabled her to develop mutant plants and to create and give life to plants that have long been thought to be extinct.

== Romantic relationships ==
=== Batman ===
Ivy and Batman have worked together in achieving common goals and are frequently depicted as having a romantic relationship. Batman's attraction to Ivy is present in some way in several mediums in which the characters appear. There has always been a sexual tension between the two, most notably in their canonical earlier encounters.

In her first appearance, Ivy is established as having an attraction to Batman, and tries to convince Batman to join her side and creates love potions that ensnare him.

In the 1997 story Batman: Poison Ivy, Christopher DeJardin tries to kill Ivy, and Batman takes the bullet. Batman, who was wearing body armor, knocks him out. Ivy considers his saving her from death as proof he loves her, though he responds that she does not know the meaning of the word.

Her attraction is confirmed in Widening Gyre.

At first, Ivy's infatuation with Batman was one-sided; later stories presented the attraction as more mutual, but hindered by reluctance on Batman's part. She later kisses Bruce during a robbery, poisoning him. But when she subsequently kisses a dying Batman, she unknowingly cures her intended victim and establishes a budding romantic tension between them. During the "No Man's Land" arc, Batman comes to her rescue while she is held captive by Clayface, with Ivy remarking that she knew he would.

In Batman: Pavane (1989), while being interviewed as a potential candidate for the Suicide Squad, Pamela reveals to Inspector Stuart how she became Poison Ivy. When she heard about Batman, she instantly fell in love with him—believing him to be the “perfect man”; going so far as to make a love shrine of him. With her goal set, she moved to Gotham, created a costume and renamed herself “Poison Ivy”; she then began committing crimes for the purpose of getting his attention in the hopes of them becoming the #1 crime couple. Unfortunately for Pamela, it did not work out the way she wanted it to, and so she was apprehended and sent to Arkham Asylum.

In Batman: Hothouse (1992), Batman gains an obsession with Isley. Later, she kisses him. Now completely deranged, Ivy thinks herself "Titania, Queen of the May", and Batman her Oberon—as Batman struggles with the hallucinations induced by the kiss, she pins him down and prepares to unmask him. With his last burst of strength, Batman kicks the greenhouse's sprinklers on, washing away Ivy's pheromones. The sobered Batman chases an increasingly desperate Ivy onto the greenhouse's catwalks, where he barely manages to save Ivy from falling to her death. Subsequently, Ivy is returned to Arkham Asylum, her twisted love for Batman stronger than ever.

In one of the annuals of Batman: Shadow of the Bat, a mutual attraction between Poison Ivy and the Batman is obvious: Ivy considers Batman "the perfect man", and in a conversation with his butler, Alfred Pennyworth, he admits to finding her attractive and more appealing than Catwoman. She subsequently targets Bruce Wayne as one of those she blames for recent environmental 'crimes', giving him her poisoned kiss, but when she kisses Batman later and brags about how a second kiss is the antidote, Batman thus creates the impression that he is immune to her poisons.

In the Batman Chronicles (1995) story Passion's Fruit (1997), Ivy is depicted as feeling lonely and deeply missing Batman while at Arkham Asylum. She hatches a scheme to unleash some of her plant creations to cause havoc in Gotham, multiplying at contact with water, until Batman finally pays her a visit at the asylum. In exchange for the visit and a kiss, she morphs her creations into harmless strawberry plants. At the end of the story, she is seen to be in improved spirits.

In Batman/Poison Ivy: Cast Shadows (2004), Batman and Ivy work together to find a killer carrying out a series of Ivy-like murders at Arkham. His butler, Alfred Pennyworth, notes that Batman has been poisoned by the flowers. Batman tells Alfred he must kiss Ivy for the cure, and that if he fails Alfred must kill him. Ivy and Batman confront each other, where Batman warns Ivy that he'll have to knock her out to kiss her to make sure that she does not kill him when he passes out after being cured. Ivy insists for him to trust her, despite Batman's doubts. Batman at first decides to punch her, hesitates, then they embrace and kiss passionately instead. Upon being cured, he falls, but saves himself, and saves Ivy as Gotham Tower collapses when — assuming Batman dead — Ivy tries to kill herself, once more insinuating that it is more than just lust she feels for him. Ivy and Batman share a moment together speaking, watching her plant creations create light, and Batman compliments her on her talent. Batman takes Ivy back to Arkham Asylum, so that Ivy can finish her rehabilitation. Discouraged, Ivy complains to Batman about the lack of light in her cell, and Batman responds that there is nothing he can do about it, before departing. Transferred to a new cell the next morning, Ivy is stunned when she discovers that her room has been moved to a special cell where she can be in the sunlight, and has been filled with flowers as a gift. Upon being told some "anonymous benefactor" wanted to make sure her time is not as daunting as it might have been, a touched Ivy smiles and thanks Batman.

In Detective Comics (vol. 2) #14 (January 2013), Ivy kisses Batman, trying to gain control over him via her toxins, and saying, “You're the only one for me Batman, you know that right? Nobody else even comes close. Not anybody.⁣⁣⁣” Rather than using an antidote, he rigs his visor to show him certain set of visual stimuli that will effectively erase his short-term memory, thereby erasing any commands she gives him as well. Aware of his resistance, she tries to appeal to his sense of morality.

In Gothtopia, Batman comes to her rescue when he realizes she was telling him the truth, even though he put her in Arkham. First she punches him for not believing her claims, and then she kisses him for coming to her rescue, poisoning him with her mind control toxin. Resisting it, he warns that they would be best off helping each other for now. Thanks to her own resistance and the kiss he received, both Batman and Ivy become immune to Scarecrow's gas effect.

In the 2021 Fear State Comic Series, Batman: 113 features an exploration into Batman's mind and shows Poison Ivy kissing him, alongside both Catwoman and Talia al Ghul seemingly confirming towards a past relationship between the two characters in the current canon universe. In the thirteenth issue of the Poison Ivy Solo Series, Bruce refers to their past romantic relationship when talking to Pamela once she returns to Gotham.

The relationship even briefly deviated from the Batman/Ivy relationship into a Bruce/Pamela one when, in the comic series Batman: Gotham Knights, he helps her return to normal.

In Batman: The Long Halloween, Bruce and Ivy engage in an implied sexual relationship during the three month time period Bruce was under her mind control as instructed by mob boss Carmine Falcone.

=== Harley Quinn ===
Prior to the New 52 reboot, Ivy is shown as teamed up on occasion with fellow villain Harley Quinn with Harley being her best friend and recurring ally. They are sometimes shown as romantically involved. Unlike most villain team-ups, their partnership is based on genuine friendship and mutual respect. Ivy sincerely wants to save Harley from her unhealthy abusive relationship with the Joker. Accordingly, Poison Ivy despises the Joker, and the two exchange vicious banter at every opportunity. In the final storyline of the Gotham City Sirens series, Harley suggests that Ivy may be in love with her, an accusation that stuns her. The following issue has Poison Ivy acknowledge that she may indeed love Harley, but the details of her love are never specified, and the series ended with the New 52 reboot before their relationship could be addressed.

In June 2015, Poison Ivy was revealed to be romantically involved with Harley Quinn by Harley Quinn series writers Jimmy Palmiotti and Amanda Conner, stating that she is in a romantic relationship with Harley "without the jealousy of monogamy".

In Harley Quinn (vol. 1) #8, Harley went on a vacation with Ivy to a nudist colony in which she tried to convince Ivy to move in with her, but while Ivy admitted that she loves Harley more than any other person on Earth and would love to spend as much time with her as possible, she is currently more dedicated to saving the environment. Harley was disappointed and very sad, but accepted it and the two parted with promises to meet again.

In Injustice 2 #70, which takes place in an alternate universe, Poison Ivy states that she was married to Harley Quinn.

== Teams ==
Ivy teamed up on occasion with fellow villain, Harley Quinn with Harley being her close friend and recurring ally. The partnership between Harley and Ivy has also at times included Catwoman, such as in episodes and issues of the Gotham Girls webtoon and comic book series. In the mainstream DC Universe, the three formed an alliance in the pages of Gotham City Sirens.

Poison Ivy was invited to join the Birds of Prey by Black Canary in The New 52 continuity reboot. Katana and Starling reject the idea and even attack Ivy, but after a brief scuffle, the women begin working together as a team. She remained with the team for a time, but eventually betrayed them, shortly before the team split-up. When the Birds were reformed under the leadership of Batgirl, Poison Ivy was not invited back.

Poison Ivy joins Two-Face's gang for a short period of time during Batman: Dark Victory, when she murders crime boss Lucia Viti on Two-Face's orders. She is notably the only member of the gang to be upset by Two-Face's casual murder of fellow gang member Solomon Grundy, a plant-based entity. The gang is broken up after Two-Face's apparent death at the hands of the Joker.

Poison Ivy is a member of the original Injustice Gang of the World, which fights the Justice League on several occasions.

She joins the Secret Society of Super Villains for a mission against the Justice League. She later joins Alexander Luthor Jr.'s incarnation of the Society.

She is coerced into being a member of the Suicide Squad. During this time, she uses her abilities to enslave Count Vertigo.

== Reception ==
IGN's list of the Top 100 Comic Book Villains of All Time ranked Poison Ivy as #64. She was ranked 21st in Comics Buyer's Guide's "100 Sexiest Women in Comics" list.

== Other versions ==
- An alternate universe version of Poison Ivy appears in JLA: Created Equal. This version was killed after traveling through the Green in an attempt to learn what caused the Fall and killed almost every male on Earth.
- An alternate universe version of Poison Ivy appears in Batman: Crimson Mist as one of several villains killed by a vampiric Batman.
- An alternate universe version of Poison Ivy appears in Batman/Demon: A Tragedy. This version is a healer who is later killed by Etrigan the Demon.
- An alternate universe version of Poison Ivy appears in Flashpoint. This version is an associate of Superman and head of the Oasis refuge.
- Poison Ivy appears in Batman/Teenage Mutant Ninja Turtles.
- An alternate universe version of Poison Ivy appears in Batman: White Knight.
- An alternate universe version of Poison Ivy appears in Harley Quinn: Breaking Glass. This version is Ivy Du-Barry, an Afro-Asian student of Gotham High and member of its film club.
- An alternate universe version of Poison Ivy appears in Absolute Batman. This version is a scientist who experimented with all six kingdoms of life and was turned into a hybrid of them after being trapped in her lab by the Joker.

== In other media ==
=== Television ===
==== Live-action ====
- Poison Ivy appears in Gotham, portrayed by Clare Foley in the first two seasons, Maggie Geha in the third season and first half of the fourth season, and Peyton List from then into the fifth season. This version is Ivy Pepper, a street kid who taught herself to use plants and herbs to create mind-altering chemicals, whose father Mario was framed for the deaths of Thomas and Martha Wayne. During the third season, an encounter with Fish Mooney's enforcer Marv causes Ivy to physically age up into her twenties. In the fourth season, Ivy gains a new appearance with poisonous nails after stealing mystical chemicals from an apothecary shop.
- Two incarnations of Poison Ivy, Pamela Isley and Mary Hamilton / Poison Ivy / "Poison Mary", appear in Batwoman, portrayed by Bridget Regan and Nicole Kang respectively. This version of Isley is a scientist and ex-lover of Renee Montoya who was put into suspended animation by her. After one of Isley's vines is stolen and thrown into the Gotham River, it infects Hamilton with Isley's essence. Montoya revives Isley, who retakes her essence from Hamilton and tries to renew her plans, only to be foiled by Batwoman.
- Poison Ivy is set to headline a planned television series produced by DC Studios for HBO, with Lauren LeFranc in negotiations to produce.

==== Animation ====
Ivy as she appeared in The New Batman Adventures.

- Poison Ivy appears in The Batman (2004), voiced by Piera Coppola. This version is a teenage environmental activist and delinquent who gained her abilities from being doused in the plant-based mutagen "chlorogene". Due to her younger age, the seductive side of her personality was heavily toned down.
- Poison Ivy appears in Batman: The Brave and the Bold, voiced by Jennifer Hale in the episode "Chill of the Night!" and Vanessa Marshall in "The Mask of Matches Malone!". This version is served by "Flower Children".
- Poison Ivy appears in the Young Justice episode "Revelation", voiced by Alyssa Milano. This version is a member of the Injustice League.
- Poison Ivy appears in the Super Best Friends Forever short "Time Waits for No Girl".
- Poison Ivy appears in Robot Chicken DC Comics Special 2: Villains in Paradise, voiced by Clare Grant. This version is a member of the Legion of Doom.
- Poison Ivy makes primarily non-speaking cameo appearances in Teen Titans Go!, voiced by Courtenay Taylor in the episode "Jam".
- Poison Ivy appears in DC Super Friends, voiced by Fryda Wolff.
- Poison Ivy appears in DC Super Hero Girls (2015) and its tie-in films, voiced by Tara Strong. This version is a student at Super Hero High.
- Poison Ivy appears in Justice League Action, voiced by Natasha Leggero.
- Poison Ivy appears in Harley Quinn, voiced by Lake Bell. This version is more sarcastic, cynical, modest, and introverted than other incarnations, with the typically sultry aspects of her character having been toned down. Additionally, she is Harley Quinn's best friend, later girlfriend, who supports her in separating from the Joker and becoming an independent supervillain. In flashbacks, she pursued an affair with her college professor Jason Woodrue, who attempted to kill her after failing to steal a plant serum she developed. Nonetheless, she used it to save herself, turning into Poison Ivy in the process.
  - Ivy appears in the Kite Man: Hell Yeah! episode "Pilot, Hell Yeah!", voiced again by Bell.
- Poison Ivy appears in DC Super Hero Girls (2019), voiced by Cristina Milizia. This version is a lonely misanthrope and member of the Super Villain Girls who refuses to eat vegetables and displays a voracious craving for meat.
- Poison Ivy appears in Batwheels, voiced by Kailey Snider.

===== DC Animated Universe =====
Poison Ivy appears in media set in the DC Animated Universe (DCAU), voiced by Diane Pershing.

- First appearing in Batman: The Animated Series (1992), her metahuman characteristics are initially downplayed, with her immunity to toxins that also renders her infertile being the only ability displayed. As such, she does not directly control plants, instead breeding special plants and using her chemistry knowledge and a wrist-mounted crossbow in her crimes.
- In The New Batman Adventures, Ivy was aesthetically revamped to look more plant-like, sporting light green skin and a dark green outfit that exposes her legs. Additionally, she is more humorous and seductive in personality, coinciding with her friendly relationship with Harley Quinn, and her fanatical plant-based mindset is greatly reduced.
- While Ivy does not appear in Batman Beyond, the episode "Out of the Past" includes a portrayal of her in the play The Legend of Batman. When asked about Ivy's fate, series creator Paul Dini stated that she moved to South America and settled in the Amazon rainforest, allowing her physical body to merge with and become one with the environment.
- Ivy appears in the Static Shock episode "Hard As Nails".
- An alternate universe version of Ivy makes a cameo appearance in the Justice League two-part episode "A Better World" who has a conversation with The Flash. This version was lobotomized by the Justice Lords and became a gardener at Arkham Asylum. Series co-developer Bruce Timm stated that he rejected further appearances for the character in favor of focusing on new characters and storylines while bringing back a minimal number of villains from previous series.

=== Film ===
==== Live-action ====
Uma Thurman as Poison Ivy in the 1997 film Batman & Robin.

- Poison Ivy appears in Batman & Robin (1997), portrayed by Uma Thurman. This version is a Wayne Enterprises botanist who experiments with the Venom serum and crossbreeding plants with animal DNA so they can fight back and protect themselves. Her colleague Jason Woodrue steals her work to create Bane and tries to kill her with various toxins, but inadvertently transforms her into Poison Ivy. After killing Woodrue, Ivy joins forces with Bane and Mr. Freeze to destroy Gotham, during which she attempts to kill Nora Fries. However, Batman, Robin, and Batgirl save Nora and thwart the villains, with Ivy and Freeze becoming cellmates at Arkham Asylum.
- Birds of Prey director Cathy Yan wanted to make a sequel that could have explored the relationship between Harley Quinn and Poison Ivy, with the latter meant to appear in Gotham City Sirens, until the film was put on hold.

==== Animation ====
- The Batman: Arkham incarnation of Poison Ivy makes a non-speaking cameo appearance in Batman: Assault on Arkham.
- Poison Ivy appears in Lego DC Comics Super Heroes: Justice League: Gotham City Breakout, voiced again by Vanessa Marshall.
- Poison Ivy appears in The Lego Batman Movie, voiced by Riki Lindhome.
- Poison Ivy appears in Batman and Harley Quinn, voiced by Paget Brewster.
- Poison Ivy appears in Scooby-Doo! & Batman: The Brave and the Bold, voiced again by Tara Strong.
- A Victorian era-inspired alternate universe version of Poison Ivy appears in Batman: Gotham by Gaslight, voiced by Kari Wuhrer. This version is an exotic dancer and opium addict who was looked after by Sister Leslie until she is murdered by Jack the Ripper.
- Poison Ivy appears in Lego DC Comics Super Heroes: The Flash, voiced again by Vanessa Marshall.
- A Feudal Japan-inspired incarnation of Poison Ivy appears in Batman Ninja, voiced by Atsuko Tanaka in the Japanese version and again by Tara Strong in the English dub.
- Poison Ivy makes a non-speaking cameo appearance in Justice League vs. the Fatal Five.
- Poison Ivy appears in Batman vs. Teenage Mutant Ninja Turtles, voiced again by Tara Strong.
- Poison Ivy appears in Batman: Hush, voiced by Peyton List.
- Poison Ivy appears in Batman: The Long Halloween, voiced by Katee Sackhoff. This version sports a modernized design.
- Poison Ivy makes a non-speaking cameo appearance in Injustice.
- An alternate reality incarnation of Poison Ivy appears in Batman: The Doom That Came to Gotham, voiced by Gideon Adlon. This version is a cultist who is transformed into a plant-like demon by Cthulhu's essence and is later killed in an explosion while fighting Oliver Queen.
- Poison Ivy appears in Merry Little Batman, voiced by Therese McLaughlin.
- Poison Ivy appears in Justice League: Crisis on Infinite Earths, voiced again by Katee Sackhoff.
- A 16th century Mesoamerica-themed alternate universe version of Poison Ivy called Forest Ivy appears in Aztec Batman: Clash of Empires, voiced by Maya Zapata.

=== Video games ===
- Poison Ivy appears as a boss in Batman: The Animated Series (1993).
- Poison Ivy appears as a boss in The Adventures of Batman & Robin.
- Poison Ivy appears as a boss in Batman: Chaos in Gotham.
- Poison Ivy appears as a boss in Batman & Robin (1998).
- Poison Ivy appears as a boss in Batman: Vengeance, voiced again by Diane Pershing.
- Poison Ivy appears as a boss in Batman: Dark Tomorrow, voiced by Wendy Jones.
- Poison Ivy makes a cameo appearance in Batman: Rise of Sin Tzu.
- A vehicle inspired by Poison Ivy appears in Batman: Gotham City Racer.
- Poison Ivy appears in DC Universe Online, voiced by Cyndi Williams. This version is a member of the Secret Society.
- Poison Ivy, based on the New 52 incarnation, appears in Minecraft via the "Batman" DLC.
- Poison Ivy appears as a playable character in Infinite Crisis, voiced by Tasia Valenza.
- Poison Ivy appears as a character summon in Scribblenauts Unmasked: A DC Comics Adventure.
- Poison Ivy appears as a support card in the mobile version of Injustice: Gods Among Us.
- Poison Ivy appears as a playable character in Injustice 2, voiced again by Tasia Valenza. This version is a member of Gorilla Grodd's Society.
- Poison Ivy appears as a cosmetic outfit in Fortnite.
- Poison Ivy appears in DC Super Hero Girls: Teen Power, voiced again by Christina Milizia.
- Poison Ivy appears in Justice League: Cosmic Chaos, voiced again by Tasia Valenza.

==== Lego DC series ====
- Poison Ivy appears as a playable character and boss in Lego Batman: The Videogame, voiced by Vanessa Marshall.
- Poison Ivy appears in Lego Batman 2: DC Super Heroes, voiced by Laura Bailey. Ivy also appears in the film adaptation, also voiced by Bailey.
- Poison Ivy appears as a playable character in Lego Batman 3: Beyond Gotham, voiced by Tara Strong.
- Poison Ivy appears as a boss in Lego Dimensions, voiced by Tasia Valenza. She is available via The Lego Batman Movie DLC pack.
- Poison Ivy appears as a playable character and boss in Lego DC Super-Villains, voiced by Tasia Valenza.
- Poison Ivy appears in Lego Batman: Legacy of the Dark Knight, voiced by Alexandra Guelff. Her appearance in the main story is based off the Batman & Robin incarnation, but in “Mayhem Mode”, she has green skin and dark red hair, similar to more modern incarnations of Ivy.

==== Batman: Arkham ====
Poison Ivy appears in the Batman: Arkham series, voiced primarily by Tasia Valenza.

- First appearing as a boss in Batman: Arkham Asylum, she sports plant-based growths on her body and is empowered by the Joker with the Titan formula.
- In Batman: Arkham City she has taken up residence in an abandoned hotel within the eponymous city-prison, relying on brainwashed criminals and TYGER guards for protection.
- In Batman: Arkham City Lockdown, she is voiced by Amy Carle.
- In Batman: Arkham Knight, Scarecrow attempts to recruit her into an alliance formed between himself and the Arkham Knight, among others, to kill Batman. After she refuses the offer, the Arkham Knight's militia imprison her until she is rescued by Batman. She then reluctantly forms an alliance with him to stop Scarecrow due to the latter spreading his fear toxin throughout Gotham, killing her plants. Ivy eventually sacrifices herself to save Gotham from the toxin.
- A clone of Poison Ivy created by Lex Luthor, simply called Ivy, appears in Suicide Squad: Kill the Justice League, voiced by Darcy Rose Byrnes. Following her creation, she escapes LexCorp amidst Brainiac's invasion of Metropolis and is recruited into the Suicide Squad to help them kill the Justice League.

=== Miscellaneous ===
- The DCAU incarnation of Poison Ivy appears in Gotham Girls, voiced again by Diane Pershing.
- Poison Ivy appears in Holy Musical B@man!, portrayed by Jaime Lyn Beatty.
- Poison Ivy appears in the DC Icons novel Catwoman: Soulstealer.

== See also ==
- List of Batman family enemies
