= BAPA =

BAPA may refer to:

- British Amateur Press Association, an amateur press association founded 1890
- British Amateur Press Association (comics fandom), an amateur press association active 1977-2004
- Birds Australia Parrot Association, a special interest group of the Royal Australasian Ornithologists Union
- Los Angeles High School of the Arts, formerly known as the Belmont Academy of Performing Arts
- Beta-peptidyl aminopeptidase, an enzyme

== See also ==
- Bapa (disambiguation), a surname and honorific
