= Mark Finch =

English LGBT cinema promoter

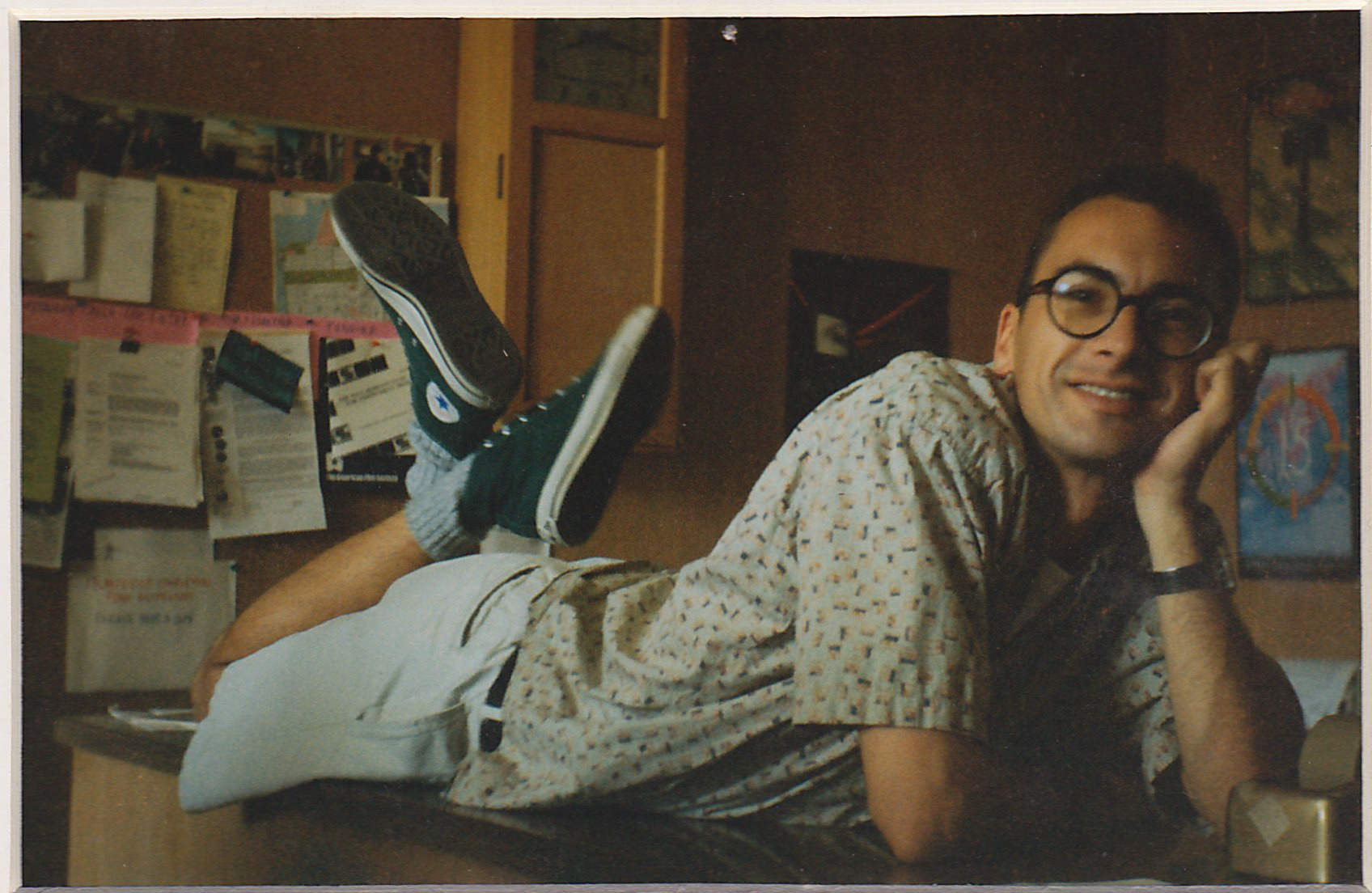
Mark Finch

Mark Finch (21 October 1961 – 14 January 1995) was an English promoter of LGBT cinema. Having founded and expanded several international film festivals he created the first LGBT film market for distributors, sales agents, and independent film producers.

== Early life ==
Born in Manchester in 1961, Finch never identified with the city, having moved to Cambridge with his mother and siblings after the divorce of his parents. For the rest of his life he was afflicted with severe bouts of depression and it was in his attempts to escape from these that he developed a passionate interest in film and, to a lesser extent, comics. In 1975 he began to publish a photocopied film fanzine entitled Worlds, which also included reviews of comics and science fiction. The magazine was not the success that he hoped and by 1976, after five issues, he owed £80 to the printer: a substantial sum at the time to a 15-year-old schoolboy. He had already attempted suicide once by paracetamol overdose and although he considered another attempt in the face of such debt, he was cheered by a friend's gift of the requisite sum.

Even with income from a part-time job at the Arts Picture House in Cambridge, Finch realised that he could not afford to publish magazines so he joined CAPA, a recently formed amateur press association, which soon merged with the larger BAPA. With typical panache Finch introduced himself to his fellow apans with a zine entitled There are fairies at the bottom of my garden. He later published a single issue of a magazine entitled Equality addressing gender issues in popular culture.

In 1981, Finch left Cambridge to attend the London Polytechnic but he abandoned his studies after another suicide attempt that led to his compulsory attendance at a psychiatric hospital in Barnet. Upon his recovery he attended the University of Warwick where he read for a bachelor's honours degree in film and literature. He chose the university because he wanted to study under Richard Dyer, professor of film there, who had organised the first gay cinema event at the National Film Theatre in 1977. While in Coventry he wrote for a variety of journals, contributing articles about gay themes and camp in Hollywood cinema. Upon graduation he returned to London to work as a programmer for the British Film Institute (BFI). After living a short while in a friend's flat on Long Acre, Finch moved in with his established partner, an Anglican clergyman, in Walworth.

== Character ==
Throughout his life Mark Finch was boyishly charming and often masked his private depression with public bonhomie. His gently camp affectation would occasionally dissolve into tantrum socially but such outbursts were not part of his professional life, which was characterised by lively industry, incisive wit and a passionate affability. He delighted in wordplay and inventive imagery; he never stopped writing absurd narratives, and sharp observations of his surroundings. Such commentaries were sent to friends in small packages with brief covering notes or topped and tailed with the greetings and codas of more formal letters. Soon after his birthday each year after his first arrival in London he would often create an inventive calendar collage for the coming year. Similar publications became commercial products in the mid-1990s but Finch's creations were obviously amateur and intensely personal. They were photocopied, spiral-bound and mailed to friends as pre-Christmas gifts.

== Film festivals ==
In 1984, Elizabeth Hutar founded the Piccadilly Film Festival as an added component to the Piccadilly Arts Festival, which had been in existence for a few years previous. Mark Finch was invited to come to London by Donald Reeves, Rector at St James's Church, Piccadilly, and Peter Pelz, director of the Piccadilly Arts Festival, to join the team working on the festival. In the following years, Finch continued and greatly improved the festival, which ran for a total of 11 years. Finch worked from offices at St James's Church, Piccadilly, from which he developed a huge network of contacts far greater than had been the case at BFI. With his strong interest in gay culture in general and gay cinema in particular, it was inevitable that Finch would make great efforts to develop that aspect of the film festival. In 1986 he established the format that subsequent LGBT film festivals would follow. He then decided that it would be more appropriate to launch a specialist festival rather than overwhelm the more general Piccadilly festival with LGBT movies. In 1988 he led the launch of the London Lesbian & Gay Film Festival, now known as the BFI Flare: London LGBT Film Festival.

Finch brought his mainstream festival skills to bear upon niche festivals. He arranged pre-festival press conferences and exhorted mainstream media sources to take the events seriously. He also understood what journalists needed to make "news" so he provided comments for publication.

Working extensively with LGBT filmmakers and distributors worldwide, Finch was particularly drawn to San Francisco. He moved there initially to launch and manage Frameline Distribution and then was hired in 1991 as Exhibitions and Festival Director for Frameline, running the San Francisco International Lesbian and Gay Film Festival from 1992 to 1994 with festival co-director Jenni Olson. He continued to write about film for a mainstream and LGBT publications including the Bay Area Reporter. With his extensive contacts and honed promotional skills he was able to effect huge increases to the number of films screened by the Festival and broaden the range of places that showed the subsequent touring programme each year. In the years of Finch's direction, festival attendances almost quadrupled to 55,000. The extended reach made the event a key international showcase for LGBT filmmakers and producers.

Recognising the difficulties in bringing LGBT films to market, Finch worked to develop the first market for distributors, sales agents, and independent LBGT film producers — however those plans were disrupted by his death. The growth of the festival under his leadership demanded an organizational step change but this increased expenses out of proportion with revenue: the festival and Frameline were soon in financial difficulties. Tess Martin was brought in as executive director in October 1994 and promptly reduced the payroll and the size of the forthcoming festival. Finch had found the financial strictures in the face of continuing growth both frustrating and depressing. This external confirmation of his concerns exacerbated his mood.

== Legacy ==
Finch was coming to the end of a course of the antidepressant drug Effexor on a reduced dose when he ended his own life unseen on a rainy Saturday afternoon. He left his leather briefcase against the pedestrian walkway railing mid-span of the Golden Gate Bridge. His office desk contained several suicide notes but his death was not confirmed until his body was found nearly six weeks later, seven miles out to sea, near Pillar Point Harbor, about 25 miles south of the bridge from which he jumped. The coroner described his body as "intact but unrecognisable". Many of his friends and colleagues were deeply shocked by his death but his close friends were not surprised by his cinematic ending. His eulogist, Jenni Olson, summed it up: "Of course, given his personality, I just thought, 'Oh, how Mark' that it would be so spectacular. He doesn't do anything in a small way." A memorial service was held at the Castro Theatre on 26 February 1995, and the 19th San Francisco Festival was dedicated to Finch's memory. A special fund was established in his name "to help support the work of emerging queer filmmakers". Ten years after his death Olson made a film, The Joy of Life, of which the second half addresses his suicide and the part played in it by the Golden Gate Bridge.

Although the loss of his unstinting support of new work was a huge blow to many LGBT filmmakers, the festivals and the market that he developed have provided an enduring structure for the promotion of such films. His body of writing continues to be cited widely and he appeared as an actor in two films: Gregg Araki's gay road romance The Living End (1992) and (posthumously) in Todd Verow's dramatization of the controversial Dennis Cooper novel Frisk (1995).

== Selected works ==
- Mark Finch, 'Sex and Address in Dynasty', Screen 27(6) (Glasgow: 1986), 24-43 (Reprinted in Fabio Cleto (ed.), Camp (Ann Arbor: University of Michigan, 1999) ISBN 0-472-09722-9)
- Mark Finch and Richard Kwietniowski, 'Melodrama and Maurice: Homo is Where the Heart is', Screen, 29(3) (Glasgow, 1988)
- Mark Finch, 'George Kuchar: Half the Story' in Martha Gever, Pratibha Parmar, and John Greyson (eds.), Queer looks : perspectives on lesbian and gay film and video (New York: Routledge, 1993)
- Mark Finch, 'Gays and Lesbians in Cinema.' in Gary Crowdus (ed.), Cineaste's Political Companion To American Film (Chicago: Lake View, 1994).
