= Interlac =

Interlac may refer to:

- The intergalactic language spoken by the Wonder Twins (SuperFriends, #10, February/March, 1978)
- One of the languages spoken by the civilizations in Babylon 5
- Interlac (APA), bimonthly amateur press association devoted to the DC Comics science fiction superhero team the Legion of Super-Heroes
- Interlac is the language of the symbols on the device used by Robby Reed
