= Oktomica Comics =

American publishing company

Oktomica Comics was a short-lived comic publisher which published three series between 1998 and 1999: Virtex, The Wonderlanders and Wisp. All three series were created by Casey Lau and Jeff Kwan with scripting assistance from such comic professionals as Mike Baron, Pat Mills and Tom and Mary Bierbaum.

== Titles ==
The first book to be released was the 12-page Virtex #0 and the company's final releases were Virtex #3, The Wonderlanders #2 and Wisp #1.

- Virtex was the story of a cybernetic cowboy that chased outlaws through a time-amalgamated wasteland. An interesting gimmick was played out in the 3rd issue of the 3-part story "Divine Intervention" where the issue shipped with 3 versions: #3A, #3B, #3C, each with a different ending.
- The Wonderlanders proclaimed "What Happens When Fairy Tales Grow Up?" Merging the worlds of C. S. Lewis, L. Frank Baum and Lewis Carroll with Capcom and Saturday Morning cartoons. King Layoran and his team of Wonderlanders come to Earth to stop the evil Fenris and his team of evil Wonderlanders. The first story arc has gone uncompleted.
- Wisp was Oktomica's "horror" book - a team of specialists protect our reality from a rip in dimensions that has allowed an evil race into our world. Wisp leads the team against villains that enter our bodies physically through our mouths. Wisp only had one issue release but #1 had a variant cover by Kevin Nowlan.

== Creators ==
Oktomica is notable for its high-production values in coloring, printing, and graphic design. All 3 artists went on to bigger projects.

- Kano, artist on Virtex, worked for DC Comics drawing Action Comics and H.E.R.O..
- Kaare Andrews, artist on The Wonderlanders, wrote and drew Spider-Man: Reign for Marvel Comics, among other projects.
- Ruben Martinez, artist on Wisp, went to Stan Lee Media where he drew Backstreet Project, a comic chronicling the adventures of the Backstreet Boys as cyber-crusaders. He has also worked at Mattel Toys designing the art for Batman action figures.

== After Oktomica ==
Virtex evolved into a flash-animated series at also now defunct An action figure was planned as well. It has since been reappeared in Digital Webbing Presents.
