= Dan Alderson =

American scientist (1941–1989)

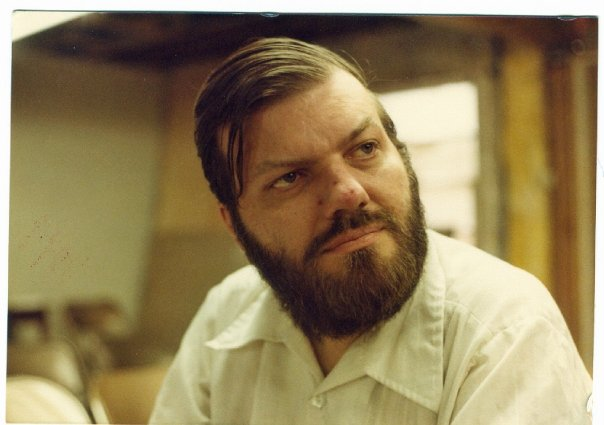
Dan Alderson at LASFS

Daniel John Alderson (October 31, 1941 – May 17, 1989) was a scientist at the Jet Propulsion Laboratory in California, and a prominent participant in science fiction fandom. He came from a middle-class family and had diabetes. A high school science fair project on the gravitational fields of non-spherical bodies won him a college scholarship to Caltech and a job at the Jet Propulsion Laboratory, where he wrote the software used to navigate Voyagers 1 and 2.

A member of the Los Angeles Science Fantasy Society, an Official Editor of the comic book APA CAPA-alpha, and an early member of gaming fandom, he came into contact with a number of science fiction writers, notably Larry Niven and Jerry Pournelle, who, in their books, credit Dan Alderson with ideas that inspired some of their science fiction, notably the Alderson drive and the Alderson disk. As "Dan Forrester" he is a prominent character in Lucifer's Hammer.

Alderson did not write science fiction himself, but for his own amusement created the imaginary planet of Toadland, a planet where everyone gets his heart's desire. As the ruler of the world, he assumed the title "Wibblefubwilda", over the Wibblefubs, Wibbles, and Wibs that populated Toadland. He died at an early age from complications of diabetes. He is remembered as a "patron saint" of the Los Angeles Science Fantasy Society, which honored his memory with a parking space reserved in his name in front of their clubhouse until they moved to a new location without dedicated parking.

Alderson devised a Fortran program (called TRAM for Trajectory Monitor) for navigation in the Solar System, still used by low-thrust craft in 2008. When Alderson lost his vision to diabetic complications, he was able to continue working at JPL by dictating to an unpaid "seeing eye person." Before he was forced to retire for medical reasons, he created a complex subroutine package (Portable NameList) in Fortran, strictly by dictation. He organized things so well that he was able to create a number of secondary subroutines and functions, keeping all arguments in a strict order to avoid confusion.

Alderson was a confirmed night owl. It was well known at JPL that, if someone saw him at his desk at 8 AM, he'd been there all night. As his health failed, he paid less and less attention to the time, sometimes leaving for a 3 PM appointment at 3:30 PM.
