= Bapa =

Bapa may refer to:

- Jalaram Bapa (1799–1937), Hindu saint from Gujarat, India
- Thakkar Bapa (1869–1951), Indian social worker in Gujarat, India
- Chhagan Bapa (1894–1968), Indian social worker in Gujarat, India
- Bapa, a 1997 Indian Odia-language film starring Sidhant Mohapatra

== See also ==
- BAPA (disambiguation)
- Brendan Schaub, American stand-up comedian, podcast host and mixed martial arts fighter
