= Kano (comics) =

Pseudonym of a Spanish comic book artist (born 1973)

- Born: Jose Ángel Cano López; 1973 (age 52–53) Barcelona
- Areas: Penciller, Inker, Colorist
- Notable works: Action Comics; Beta Ray Bill: Godhunter

Kano is the pseudonym of Spanish comic book artist Jose Ángel Cano López.

== Biography ==
Kano began his career at the age of 13, editing Spanish-language comics fanzines; at 15 he was already doing layouts and design work for Planeta-DeAgostini (later doing covers and illustrations for the Spanish editions of Marvel comics). Kano is a founding member of the Spanish magazine about comics Krazy Comics as well as the Phoenix Studio, which provided design, illustration and publishing services and was eventually merged with Camaleón Ediciones, a publishing house that Kano worked for in his early days.

Before settling as a professional cartoonist, Kano has done extensive work in the fields of illustration and animation, providing storyboards for D'Ocon Films and LolaFilms and design work for Telefónica-Movistar, Mitsubishi and various advertising agencies.

In 1998, encouraged by his wife Elsken, Kano decided to enter US comics industry and debuted with the Virtex mini-series, published by Oktomica Comics. He then went to work for the mainstream market, where he succeeded Germán García on Action Comics at DC Comics. Since then, Kano worked mostly for Marvel and DC, and, since 2014, for the revived Valiant Entertainment.

== Bibliography ==
Interior comic work includes:

- Virtex #0-3 (with Jeff Kwan, Casey Lau and Mike Baron, Oktomica Comics, 1998–1999)
- Action Comics (with Joe Kelly (except for #794), DC Comics):
  - "Action" (with Germán García, in #762-765, 2000)
  - "Critical Condition, Part Four" (in #767, 2000)
  - "Emperor Joker" (in #769-770, 2000)
  - "Kith & Kin" (in #772-773, 2000–2001)
  - "Return to Krypton, Part Four" (in #776, 2001)
  - "Kancer" (in #777, 2001)
  - "Our Worlds at War" (in #780-782, 2001)
  - "Invaders from Space" (with Chuck Kim, in #794, 2002)
  - "Walking Midnight" (with Dave Bullock, Renato Guedes, Pasqual Ferry and Duncan Rouleau, in #810, 2004)
- Just Imagine Stan Lee with Gary Frank Creating Shazam!: "On the Street" (with Michael Uslan, co-feature, DC Comics, 2002)
- H-E-R-O #1-6, 9-11 (with Will Pfeifer, DC Comics, 2003–2004)
- Smallville Magazine #6: "Magic" (with Clint Carpenter, co-feature, DC Comics, 2004)
- Gotham Central (with Greg Rucka and Ed Brubaker, DC Comics):
  - "Keystone Kops" (inks on Stefano Gaudiano, in #29-30, 2005)
  - "Dead Robin" (in #33-36, 2005)
  - "Corrigan II" (in #38-40, 2006)
- Spider-Man Family (with Sean McKeever, anthology, Marvel):
  - "Opposites Attack!" (among other artists, in ...Featuring Spider-Man's Amazing Friends one-shot, 2006)
  - "Undone" (with David Lafuente, in #2, 2007)
- Civil War: Front Line #2: "Untitled" (with Paul Jenkins, co-feature, Marvel, 2006)
- Marvel Adventures: Fantastic Four #17-20 (with Zeb Wells, Marvel, 2006–2007)
- The Immortal Iron Fist (with Ed Brubaker and Matt Fraction (except for #24), Marvel):
  - "The Seven Capital Cities of Heaven: Round 3" (with David Aja, in #10, 2007)
  - "The Seven Capital Cities of Heaven: Round 4" (with David Aja, in #11, 2008)
  - "The Seven Capital Cities of Heaven: Round 5" (with David Aja and Javier Pulido, in #12, 2008)
  - "The Seven Capital Cities of Heaven: Round 6" (with David Aja and Tonči Zonjić, in #13, 2008)
  - "The Seven Capital Cities of Heaven: Round 7" (with Tonči Zonjić and Clay Mann, in #14, 2008)
  - The Origin of Danny Rand (2-page lead-in to a re-printing of the first two Iron Fist comics, one-shot, 2008)
  - "Li Park, the Reluctant Weapon vs. the Unstoppable Forces of Evil" (with Duane Swierczynski, in #24, 2009)
- Dead of Night Featuring Man-Thing #1 (of 4) (with Roberto Aguirre-Sacasa and Nick Percival, Marvel, 2008)
- Avengers Classic #11: "Along Came a Spider!" (with Tom Beland, co-feature, Marvel, 2008)
- Noir: "The Last Hit" (with Chris Offutt, anthology graphic novel, Dark Horse, 2009)
- Beta Ray Bill: Godhunter #1-3 (with Kieron Gillen, Marvel, 2009)
- The Invincible Iron Man (with Matt Fraction):
  - Iron Man: Requiem (framing sequence in one-shot, 2010)
  - "The New Iron Age: Ginny Stark" (in #500, co-feature, 2010)
- Marvel Zombies 5 #1-3 (of 5) (with Fred Van Lente, Marvel, 2010)
- Iron Man 2.0 #1-3, 7.1 (with Nick Spencer, Barry Kitson and Carmine Di Giandomenico, Marvel, 2011)
- Wonder Woman vol. 4 #10: "Vows" (with Brian Azzarello and Tony Akins, DC Comics, 2012)
- Daredevil vol. 3 #8: "Devil and the Details, Part Two" (with Mark Waid, Marvel, 2012)
- Swamp Thing vol. 5 (with Charles Soule (except for #0), DC Comics):
  - "To Monsters" (with Scott Snyder, in #0, 2012)
  - "Urban Jungle/This Green Hell" (in #19-20, 2013)
  - "The Whisky Tree" (with David Lapham, in #22-23, 2013)
  - "Lessons Learned" (with Javier Piña, in Annual #2, 2013)
- Quantum and Woody vol. 2 #9-10 (with James Asmus, Valiant, 2014)
- The Delinquents #1-4 (with James Asmus and Fred Van Lente, Valiant, 2014)
- Unity #25: "Unity Begins with You" (with Elliott Kalan, co-feature, Valiant, 2015)
- Book of Death: The Fall of Harbinger: "Endings" (with Joshua Dysart, one-shot, Valiant, 2015)
- Bloodshot Reborn Annual #1: "The Silver Lake Slasher" (with Jeff Lemire, co-feature, Valiant, 2016)
- Quantum and Woody vol. 3 #1-5 (with Daniel Kibblesmith, Valiant, 2017–2018)
- Livewire #5-8 (with Vita Ayala, Valiant, 2019)
- The Life and Death of Toyo Harada #5-6 (with Joshua Dysart and CAFU, Valiant, 2019)

=== Covers only ===
- Superman vol. 2 #161 (DC Comics, 2000)
- Adventures of Superman #583 (DC Comics, 2000)
- Superman: The Man of Steel #105 (DC Comics, 2000)
- Action Comics #779, 783 (DC Comics, 2001)
- Quantum and Woody vol. 2 #11 (Valiant, 2014)
- Quantum and Woody Must Die! #3 (Valiant, 2015)
- Imperium #4-7, 9 (Valiant, 2015)
- Unity #19-21 (Valiant, 2015)
- Bloodshot Reborn #5, 7, 14, 0 (Valiant, 2015–2017)
- Book of Death: The Fall of Ninjak #1 (Valiant, 2015)
- Book of Death #2 (Valiant, 2015)
- Ivar, Timewalker #12 (Valiant, 2015)
- Wrath of the Eternal Warrior #2, 11 (Valiant, 2015–2016)
- Faith vol. 1 #1 and vol. 2 #1, 7-9, 11-12 (Valiant, 2016–2017)
- Ninjak vol. 3 #11 (Valiant, 2016)
- A&A: The Adventures of Archer & Armstrong #1-8, 11-12 (Valiant, 2016–2017)
- X-O Manowar vol. 3 #47-49, 50 (jam cover) (Valiant, 2016)
- Harbinger Renegade #1-2, 8 (Valiant, 2016–2017)
- Generation Zero #1 (Valiant, 2016)
- Bloodshot U.S.A. #1 (Valiant, 2016)
- Divinity III: Stalinverse (Valiant):
  - Komandar Bloodshot #1 (Valiant, 2016)
  - Aric, Son of the Revolution #1 (Valiant, 2017)
  - Escape from Gulag 396 #1 (Valiant, 2017)
- Bloodshot's Day Off! #1 (Valiant, 2017)
- Rapture #1-2 (Valiant, 2017)
- Divinity #0 (Valiant, 2017)
- War Mother #1 (Valiant, 2017)
- Ninja-K #11-14 (Valiant, 2018)
- Britannia: Lost Eagles of Rome #2 (Valiant, 2018)
- The Forgotten Queen #1-4 (Valiant, 2019)
