= Interlac (APA) =

Amateur press association

Interlac is a bimonthly amateur press association devoted to the DC Comics science fiction superhero team the Legion of Super-Heroes. It was the first APA devoted to the Legion and, despite the decline of APAs due to Internet forums, continues to operate to this day. The site is named after the fictional language of the same name, which is the primary language used in the comic's setting.

== History ==
Rich Morrissey founded the APA in June 1976, calling it LEAPA (the LEgion Amateur Press Association); it changed its name to Interlac three mailings later. There were 15 founding members, and the first mailing was 26 pages.

At the time, there were few general-interest comics APAs, CAPA-alpha and APA-5 being the exceptions, but never before in comic book fandom had the fans of a single comic book come together in a single APA. While Interlac's form came from CAPA-alpha, its membership came from the Legion Fan Club (started by 13-year-old Mike Flynn in 1972) and The Legion Outpost (a fanzine started in 1972).

In 1976, the Legion of Super-Heroes comic was finally on a solid footing, with the rich Legion mythos giving members plenty to discuss. As the roster grew—soon reaching its 50-member limit—it became clear that the APA had become a true community. Members met each other at comic book conventions and became real-life friends; members Tom Bierbaum and Mary Gilmore met through the APA, began a romance, and eventually married.

The roster, with the exception of a few stalwarts, has turned over repeatedly. In 2000, eight of the 15 founders were still on the roster, waiting list, or honorary membership list, and four of the original 15 had remained on the roster continuously.

== Notable members ==
- Jim Shooter (founding member)
- Tom and Mary Bierbaum
- Colleen Doran

== See also ==
- Science fiction fandom
