= The Lords of Chaos =

Fantasy role-playing APA

Cover of first issue, Spring 1977

The Lords of Chaos was an amateur press association (APA) published by Nicolai Shapero from 1977 to 1981 that focused on fantasy role-playing games, particularly Dungeons & Dragons and Runequest.

== Description ==
In the mid-1970s, the sudden rise in popularity of fantasy role-playing games like Dungeons & Dragons (TSR, 1974) and Runequest (Chaosium, 1978) resulted in the publication of several zines and APAs dedicated to these games. One of the originals, based in California, was Lee Gold's Alarums & Excursions, and several APAs quickly spun off of it, including The Lords of Chaos (TLOC). This new APA was edited by Nicolai Shapero (also credited as Niall Shapero and Niall Shapiro) and was first published in Spring 1977. It initially came out every two months but switched to quarterly publication. It was mimeographed, usually 80 pages in length, and used different colored copy paper to differentiate the various articles.

The Lords of Chaos started with a focus on Dungeons & Dragons, Traveller and Runequest, but by the tenth issue, was mostly dedicated to Runequest. Authors included Steve Marsh, Steve Perrin, and Lee Gold. Contributors were paid 60 cents per stencil or $1.25 per typed page, and received a free copy of the issue to which they had contributed. At its height, it had about 200 subscribers.

Publication ceased in 1981 after 13 issues. Shapero felt that although he had started it to provide content for gamemasters, it ultimately failed in that respect, becoming instead a conversational forum. Shapero went on to create the science fiction role-playing game Other Suns, published by Fantasy Games Unlimited in 1983.

== Reception ==
In Issue 50 of Dragon (June 1981), Dave Nalle noted that there was not much interior art, the covers "are not outstanding," but it was "adequately organized" and noted that "The usual spectrum of ideas and material is presented. There are fewer comments and less chit-chat than in most APAs. Whether that is a good or a bad point is hard to say." Nalle thought the strength of TLOC was "in the high quality of its writers. Some of the best writers from other APAs are regular contributors." But Nalle found a lot of the material was "awesomely trivial." He pointed out that "almost everything comes from someone’s specific [role-playing] campaign and is really only suited to that campaign. TLOC might be of almost no use to some potential readers, though others might be able to glean some transferable ideas." Nalle concluded by giving TLOC an overall rating of 6 out of 10.
