= Poison Ivy: Cycle of Life and Death =

American comic book miniseries

- Cover to Poison Ivy: Cycle of Life and Death #1, art by Clay Mann

Publication information
- Publisher: DC Comics
- Schedule: Monthly
- Format: Limited
- Publication date: January – June 2016
- No. of issues: 6
- Main character: Poison Ivy

Creative team
- Written by: Amy Chu
- Artists: Clay Mann; Seth Mann; Sandu Florea; Cliff Richards; Al Barrionuevo; Scott Hanna
- Letterer: Janice Chiang
- Colorist: Ulises Arreola

Collected editions
- Poison Ivy: Cycle of Life and Death: ISBN 978-1-4012-6451-2

Poison Ivy: Cycle of Life and Death is a six-issue American comic book miniseries written by Amy Chu, with art primarily by Clay Mann. It was published by DC Comics from January to June 2016, and collected in a single trade paperback edition in September of the same year. The miniseries is Poison Ivy's first solo comic book series.

Chu felt that Poison Ivy had a lot of untapped potential and hoped to give the character more depth. She envisioned the character as someone with a unique moral code, conflicted between her loyalties to the plant and human worlds. The story sees Poison Ivy return to her "human persona" as scientist Dr. Pamela Isley. Suspicion falls on her following the mysterious deaths of two of her colleagues at the Gotham Botanical Gardens. While she investigates these deaths, Poison Ivy also has to deal with raising her genetically engineered plant-human "sporelings" as they age rapidly and develop superpowers.

The series received mixed to positive reviews. Chu's characterization of Poison Ivy was well-received, but reviewers noted flaws in her scripts. Several critics were impressed by the level of detail in Mann's art, while others criticized his apparent sexualization of women in the series.

== Publication history ==
=== Production ===
Poison Ivy was first introduced as a plant-themed femme fatale in the Batman comics in 1966. In her most common portrayal, Ivy was a botanist named Pamela Isley who—after a series of experiments gave her plant-based powers—became a supervillain intent on protecting the Earth's flora. A six-issue miniseries starring the Batman villain was announced in July 2015 as part of a DC Comics initiative to highlight some of the publisher's lesser-known characters. Poison Ivy: Cycle of Life and Death is Ivy's first solo comic book series.

Writer Amy Chu became involved in the project when DC Comics editor Bobbie Chase asked her to pitch ideas for a Poison Ivy story when the two met at the 2014 Baltimore Comic-Con. According to Chu, she was the only writer not to pitch an eco-terrorism storyline for the character, instead pitching a murder-mystery story. Chu said that she is well-known character, but with little continuity and she wanted to do a character's justice, while also stating that Ivy's potential as a character had long been wasted and Chu wanted to give an emotional depth and character recognition for this comic. Chu described the character as "sexy", "smart", and "powerful", and noted that she did not want to play down any of these traits. As a plant-human hybrid in Chu's version, the writer saw Ivy as being torn between her loyalties to the plant and human worlds. She pointed out that unlike other Batman villains, Ivy has no general understanding of good and evil and instead follows her own unique morality. The series sees Poison Ivy returning to her "human life" as scientist Pamela Isley, and the supporting cast were inspired by numerous scientists Chu had worked with in the past.

As the primary penciller and cover artist, Clay Mann's main inspiration for Ivy's design was the character's depiction in Batman: The Animated Series; Chu commented that his design of Ivy's character fits well into the story. Clay Mann's brother Seth was the primary inker, while Janice Chiang was the letterer and Ulises Arreola the colorist. Various other artists also contributed to the penciling and inking over the course of the series.

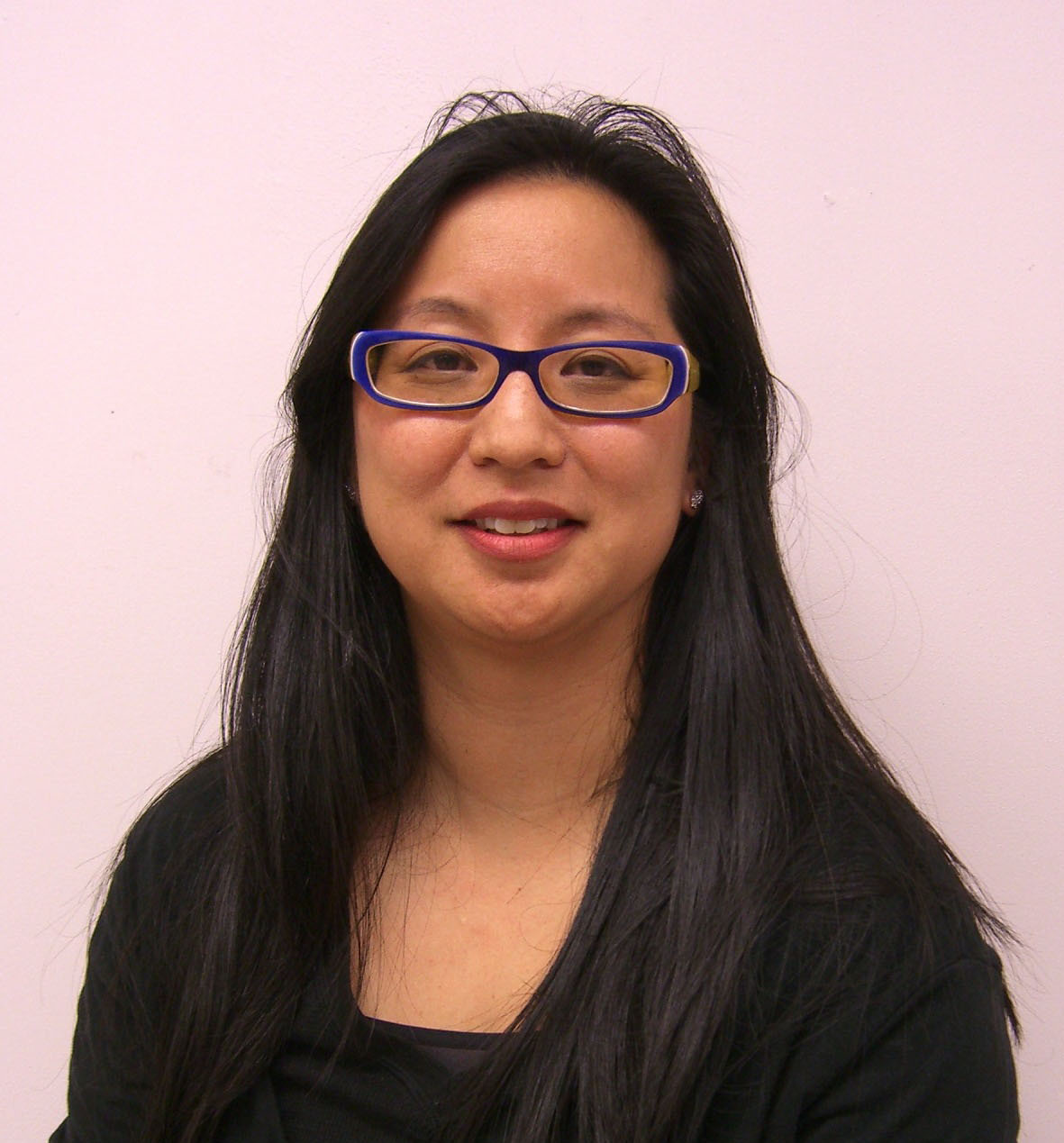
Writer Amy Chu

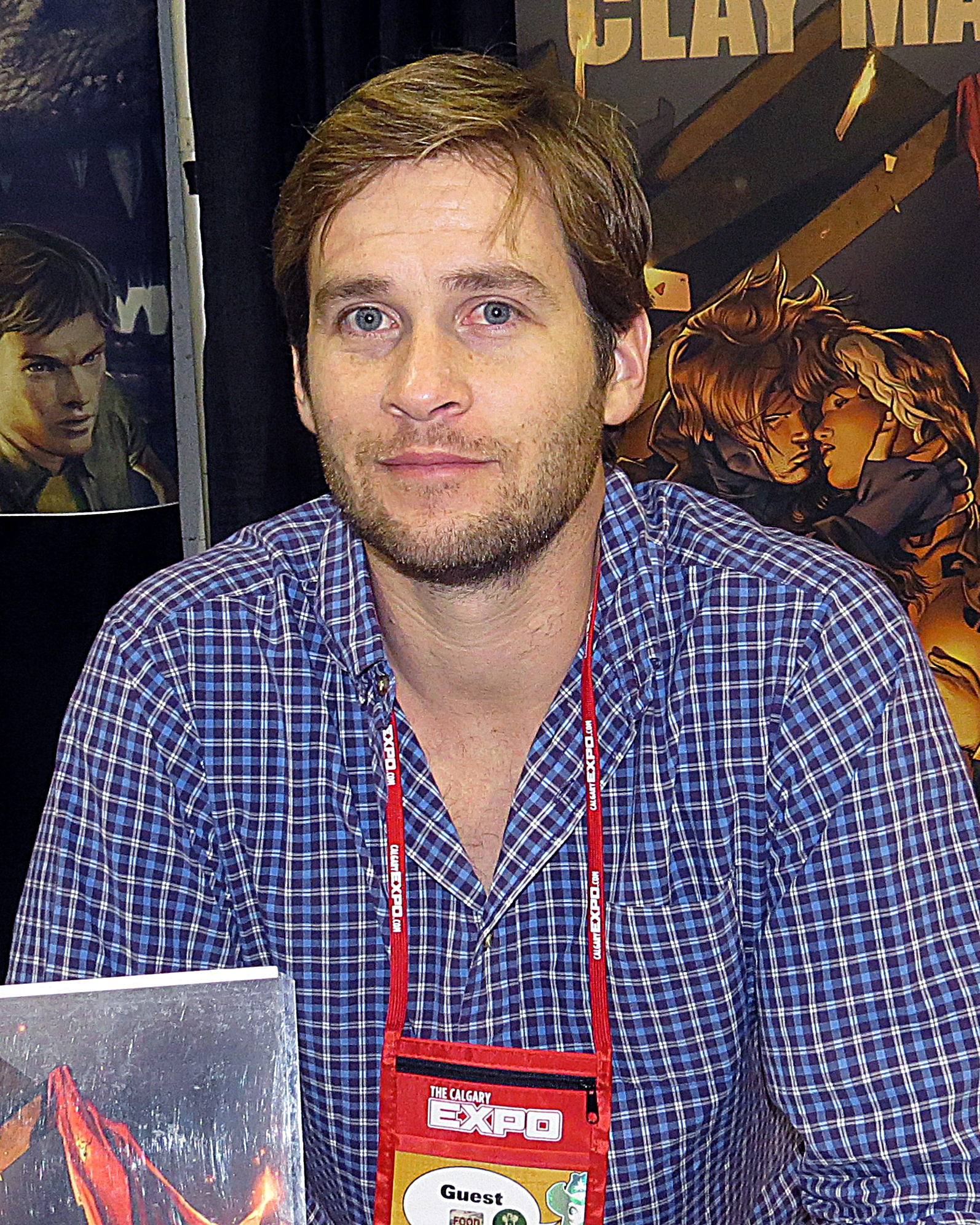
Artist Clay Mann

=== Publication ===
The six issues were published monthly by DC Comics, between January 20 and June 15, 2016. (Note: The six issues were published on January 20, February 17, March 16, April 20, May 18, and June 15, 2016.) The first issue was the 62nd best-selling comic book in North America for the month it was released, with estimated sales of 31,351 copies. The issue sold out two weeks later and a second printing was released on March 2, 2016. The next five issues remained within the top 100 best-selling comics in North America for the months they were released, with estimated sales ranging from 21,655 to 23,452 copies. (Note: Issue #2 was the 85th best-selling comic book with estimated sales of 23,452 copies, issue #3 was the 85th best-selling comic book with estimated sales of 22,812 copies, issue #4 was the 90th best-selling comic book with estimated sales of 22,504 copies, issue #5 was the 85th best-selling comic book with estimated sales of 21,655 copies, and issue #6 was the 99th best-selling comic book with estimated sales of 21,806 copies.) A trade paperback collecting the series was released on September 7, 2016. With estimated sales of 3,175 copies, it was the 17th best-selling trade paperback of the month.

== Plot ==
Ex-criminal Poison Ivy returns to her "human life" as botanist Dr. Pamela Isley. She has a job at the Gotham Botanical Gardens, researching genetically engineered plant-animal hybrids with her mentor Dr. Luisa Cruz. Ivy's new job puts her at odds with her friend Harley Quinn, who is upset that Ivy's work is taking up all her time. Cruz dies under mysterious circumstances and Ivy's research is stolen. Not long after, the skin-only remains of department chair Dr. Eric Grimley are also discovered. The investigating detectives grow suspicious of Pamela Isley, unaware that she is Poison Ivy. Ivy investigates the deaths with the help of fellow botanist Darshan Bapna.

Meanwhile, Ivy's genetically engineered plants successfully "give birth to" what appear to be two plant-human twin babies she calls "sporelings". She names them Rose and Hazel and raises them in her apartment. The sporelings age rapidly and develop plant-based superpowers. With Catwoman's help, Ivy and Darshan break into the abandoned building of the original Gotham Botanical Gardens, where they suspect Ivy's stolen research is being kept. In the building, they find a secret laboratory as well as another sporeling, created from the stolen research. The sporeling is terrified, having been locked up and experimented on by lab head Victor Lee and other scientists. Angered, Ivy kills Lee and destroys the building.

Ivy brings the third sporeling home and names her Thorn. 25 weeks later, the three sporelings have matured into young women. Ivy does not allow the sporelings to leave the apartment. Restless, they sneak out one night to explore Gotham City. The sporelings go to a gentlemen's club and cause a disturbance when Thorn uses her superpowers on a man harassing her. Police are called to the scene but Ivy manages to get the sporelings out before more arrive. Back home, Ivy seeks The Green's help in dealing with the sporelings, but is interrupted when a mutated Grimley attacks her.

Grimley reveals that he is not dead and his new mutated form merely outgrew his old human skin. Old and dying from cancer, Grimley hired Ivy knowing her research held the key to immortality. From her research, Grimley was able to develop his own sporeling stem cells which successfully cured his cancer but also mutated him into a plant-human hybrid. He reveals he poisoned Cruz when she became suspicious. By destroying Grimley's secret lab, Ivy also destroyed his supply of sporeling stem cells which he needs to stay alive. Grimley thus needs Ivy's sporelings for their stem cells. Darshan and the sporelings help Ivy fight Grimley. They are struggling until Swamp Thing shows up to help and they kill Grimley. Swamp Thing's advice leads Ivy to reconnect with Harley. With Darshan's help, the sporelings leave Gotham City to make it on their own.

== Critical response ==
Aggregate scores
Comic Book Roundup
Issue	Rating	Reviews
#1	7.1/10	31
#2	7.4/10	12
#3	7.6/10	9
#4	7.6/10	9
#5	7.9/10	6
#6	6.3/10	6
Overall	7.3/10	73

Critics gave the series mixed to positive reviews. According to review aggregator Comic Book Roundup, the first issue scored an average of 7.1/10 based on 31 reviews, while the series as a whole averaged 7.3/10 based on 73 reviews.

In her reviews for ComicsVerse, Kay Honda noted that writer Amy Chu's focus on Poison Ivy's "human" side as Dr. Pamela Isley was a departure from Ivy's past characterizations as an eco-terrorist and seductress. Comicosity's Matt Santori praised Chu's characterization of Ivy as complex and fascinating. ComicBookWire concluded that on a whole the series was an excellent examination into the character.

ComicBookWire also enjoyed the murder-mystery setup which made the series accessible even for casual readers, but found some of the action in the first half of the series to be extremely forced. Vox's Alex Abad-Santos thought that the moments in issue #1 portraying Ivy as a feminist "avenging angel" oversimplified the character. IGN's Jesse Schedeen felt the series was held back by the lack of focus in its scripts.

The series' art received mixed reviews. Several critics were impressed by the level of detail in Clay Mann's art, with Lindsey Bass of CapelessCrusader.org complimenting Mann's use of negative space to highlight personal details in Ivy's life. Reviewing issue #1, Newsarama's Pierce Lydon and Vox's Abad-Santos agreed that Mann's strength was in drawing good looking people, but both wished that Mann had been more adventurous with his panels. Some reviewers were critical of Mann's "highly sexualized" and "objectifying" depictions of women in the series, which Comicosity felt severely undermined Chu's writing. In contrast, Bass thought that Poison Ivy's sex appeal was appropriate for the story without making the character as vulgar.

With various other artists also contributing to the series, ComicBookWire and Comic Book Resources were impressed by the art's level of consistency. On the other hand, IGN's Schedeen noticed a distinct difference in art styles, while Adventures in Poor Taste's Gregory Paul Silber criticized the "wild inconsistency" across issues. Ulises Arreola was praised for his colors: Comicosity's Santori observed how Arreola complemented Chu's understated narrative by coloring much of the background and Ivy's hue with a "pleasantly dull flatness", while Silber commended Arreola's "lovely painterly style" and thematically-appropriate green motif.
