= Tom and Mary Bierbaum =

American comic book writing team

- Born: Tom Bierbaum Mary-Catherine Gilmore (Tom) 1956 (age 69–70) (Mary) 1955 (age 70–71) (Tom) Dover, Delaware, U.S. (Mary) Long Beach, California, U.S.
- Area: Writers
- Notable works: Legion of Super-Heroes

Tom and Mary Bierbaum are an American husband-and-wife writing team, known for their work on the DC comic book Legion of Super-Heroes.

== Biography ==
The Bierbaums entered the world of professional comic book writing through Legion fandom. Tom Bierbaum grew up as a Legion fan, first becoming exposed to the characters via Adventure Comics #310 (July 1963). Meanwhile, Mary Gilmore became a serious Legion fan in the late 1970s.

=== Interlac and marriage ===
Tom joined the Legion fan club The Legion Outpost, and then the Legion amateur press association Interlac, where he met fellow member Gilmore, who had joined the APA around the same time. Through Interlac, the two struck up a relationship. Gilmore lived in California, and as Bierbaum had designs on getting into the entertainment industry, he moved out west, and the two began living together, eventually getting married.

Early on in their relationship, the Bierbaums wrote stories together, their first published piece being a Halloween-themed short story for a local newspaper which was a Legion of Super-Heroes story with the characters' names and situations changed. They also submitted and published articles and stories in Interlac, which attracted the attention of veteran Legion artist Keith Giffen and future Legion editor Mark Waid (both of whom were also Interlac members).

=== Keith Giffen and early writing work ===
Recognizing the Bierbaum's devotion to the Legion, Giffen contacted them, at first using them as a sounding board for his ideas about the Legion. Giffen also utilized a new costume idea for Element Lad that Tom suggested.

In 1984, when Giffen was looking for a scripter for his "Lightning" stories in Deluxe Comics' Wally Wood's T.H.U.N.D.E.R. Agents, he recruited the husband and wife writing team for the job. That, along with their work for DC's New Talent Showcase editor Sal Amendola, convinced the editors at DC (specifically Dick Giordano) that they were ready to become Legion scripters.

=== Legion of Super-Heroes: "Five Years Later" ===
The Bierbaums wrote the first fifty issues of Legion of Super-Heroes vol. 4, from 1989 to 1993, except for the main Story in issues 21–24, written solo by Al Gordon. Working under editor Waid and alongside Giffen and Al Gordon (who was a co-writer and inker on the book) for the first 36 issues, the Bierbaums dialogued the "Five Years Later" storyline. The revival of the title was controversial with many longtime Legion fans, as it incorporated several major retcons: the editorially-mandated excision of Superboy from Legion history, the reveal that Proty's consciousness had been inhabiting Lightning Lad's body following his resurrection, and the reveal that Shvaughn Erin was a trans woman.

After Giffen's departure, the Bierbaums continued on the title for another year, overseeing the return of several classic characters, until leaving for Legionnaires (a spin-off title) after Legion issue #50 (November 1993). They wrote Legionnaires for its first 15 issues, until 1994.

The Bierbaums and Giffen also worked together on DC's short-lived offbeat title The Heckler in 1992–1993.

=== Image and other publishers ===
After their DC work, the Bierbaums went on to write various titles for Image Comics, including Supreme, SuperPatriot, Star, and Youngblood: Strikefile, as well as Xena: Warrior Princess and Jurassic Park for Topps Comics, Wonderlanders for Oktomica, and StormQuest for Caliber Comics.

=== Personal life ===
The Bierbaums live in Erie, Pennsylvania, with their two children. Mary retired from being a nurse in 1991; Tom used to freelance for Variety before becoming a staffer at the short-lived entertainment/business website Inside.com. In 2001, he began work at NBC as a ratings analyst.

== Writing method ==
As writing partners, the Bierbaums evolved a unique collaborating style. Generally, they work together in the conceptual stage, and then Tom writes the first draft. Mary works closely with Tom on the plotting, while Tom mainly writes the dialogue, with Mary acting as a sounding board for overall "feel and direction.

== Notes ==
Preceded by N/A	Legion of Super-Heroes vol. 4 writers 1989–1993; With: Keith Giffen (until 1992)	Succeeded by Tom McCraw
Preceded by N/A	Legionnaires writers 1993–1994	Succeeded by Mark Waid
