= British Amateur Press Association (comics) =

- Formation: 1977
- Dissolved: 17 August 2004
- Type: Comics organization
- Legal status: Defunct
- Purpose: Amateur press association
- Location: U.K.
- Region served: U.K.
- Members: 30
- Central Mailer: Phil Greenaway

The British Amateur Press Association was an amateur press association created by comics fans in late 1977, following a proposal from Phil Greenaway in the letter pages of the comics fanzine BEM; the first mailing (under the name PAPA, the first initial standing for "Prime") was circulated in January 1978. Greenaway was the first Central Mailer and his successors included Maureen "Mo" James, Howard Stangroom, Les Chester, and Steve Green. For most of its existence, up to thirty members of BAPA submitted multiple copies of at least two A4 pages to the central mailer every two months. BAPA was disbanded on 17 August 2004, with a final mailing distributed early in 2005. A one-off publication was also distributed under the name B-APA (sic) in 2005, in memory of Andy Roberts; a similar publication was announced in 2008, in memory of Steve Whitaker.

Notable members of this association included Eddie Campbell, Mark Finch, John Freeman, Steve Green, artist Nigel Kitching, Martin Lock, Andy Roberts, Martin Skidmore (later publisher of Fantasy Advertiser and then editor of Trident Comics), and artist Steve Whitaker.

== See also ==
- List of companies based in London
