= Amy Chu =

American comic book writer

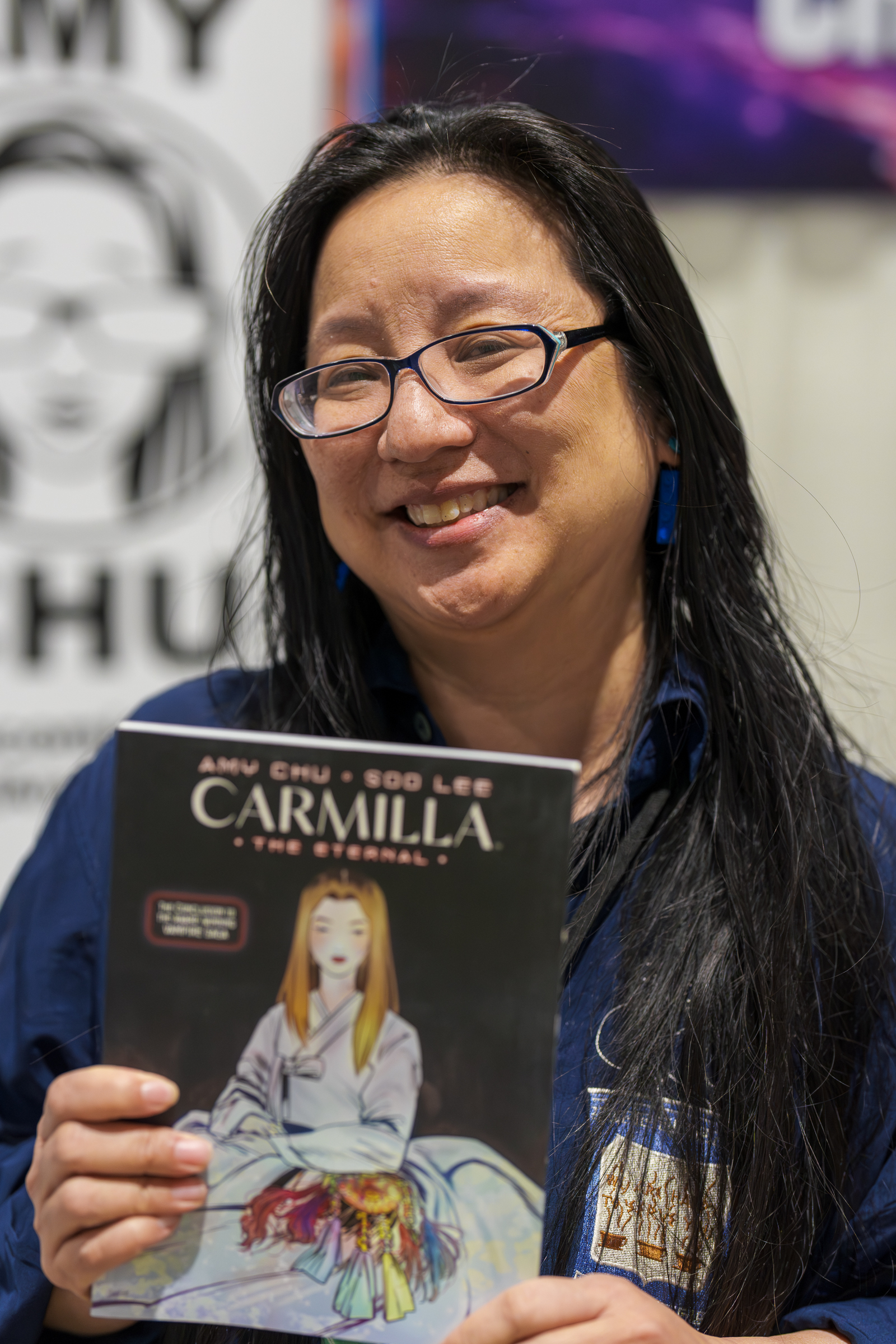
- Chu at GalaxyCon Richmond 2026
- Born: 1968 (age 57–58); Boston, Massachusetts, U.S.
- Education: Wellesley College; MIT; Harvard Business School
- Occupations: Comic book writer, publisher
- Years active: 2010–present
- Notable work: Poison Ivy: Cycle of Life and Death; Red Sonja Vol. 4; Girls Night Out
- Website: amychu.com

Amy Chu (born 1968) is an American comic book author who runs the comic imprint Alpha Girl Comics as well as writing comics for other publishers. She wrote the six-issue miniseries Poison Ivy: Cycle of Life and Death and a few Wonder Woman issues for DC.

In 2023, she won the Bram Stoker Award for Superior Achievement in a Graphic Novel.

== Early life ==
Chu was born in Boston, Massachusetts in 1968, and moved frequently in her youth, spending her formative years in Iowa. In 1989, she received dual degrees at Wellesley College and Massachusetts Institute of Technology for East Asian Studies and Architectural Design, respectively. After working overseas, she returned to the US and attended Harvard Business School for her MBA in 1999.

== Career ==
Chu worked in Hong Kong from 1995 to 1997, running the Macau tourism office.

In 2010, Chu started Alpha Girl Comics when she and her friend, Georgia Lee, discussed the lack of female voices in comics. Chu took a course in creative writing and developed her interest in comics writing from there. She has continued to focus on the lack of representation of women in the comics industry speaking on panels at comic events.

She published three collections of short stories under Alpha Girl Comics titled Girls Night Out from 2012 to 2014. Several were funded through Kickstarter, as well as in 2017, a remaster and collection of all three volumes into paperback format.

Chu has been writing Red Sonja for Dynamite Entertainment since late 2016. She also started working on Dynamite's KISS in 2016. Chu took over writing duties for Dynamite's Green Hornet beginning with the 2018 run.

Chu was recognized as a cultural leader of the year for 2018 by the Corea Image Communications Institute and said she had plans to write a comic in Seoul.

Chu wrote a comic adaptation of Carmilla drawn by Soo Lee titled Carmilla: The First Vampire set in 1990s New York City. Her work went on to win the Bram Stoker Award for Superior Achievement in a Graphic Novel.

== Personal life ==
In 2001, Chu married Laurence Chang, an investment analyst who is also a graduate of Harvard; they both kept their surnames. They have two children and as of 2018 reside in Princeton, New Jersey.

== Bibliography ==
=== Writer ===
Alpha Girl Comics

- Girls Night Out (2010–2017)
  - Girls Night Out (tpb, 104 pages, 2017) collects:
    - "And Other Stories" (with Cabbral, Louie Chin, Silvio dB, Craig Yeung and Chris Sotomayor, in #1, 2010)
    - "Tales of New York" (with Brian Shearer, Cabbral, Craig Yeung, Gannon Beck, Louie Chin, Rachelle Rosenberg, Sean Chen, Silvio dB and Tom Chu, in #2, 2011)
    - "The Way Love Goes" (with Larry Hama, Craig Yeung, Sean Von Gorman, Louie Chin, Anderson Cabral and Silvio dB, in #3, 2014)
- The VIP Room (one shot, with Silvio dB, 20 pages, 2013)

Dark Horse Comics

- The Secret Loves of Geeks (2018)
  - The Secret Loves of Geeks (tpb, 200 pages, February 2018, ISBN 1-5067-0473-5) collects:
    - "First Loves" (with Valentine De Landro, February 2018)
- Carmilla: The First Vampire (2023)

Darryl Makes Comics

- DMC (2014–2015)
  - DMC GN #2 (tpb, 100 pages, 2015, ISBN 0-9904636-1-3) collects:
    - "LAK6 Remixed!" (with Alison M Smith, in #1.5, October 2015)

Dynamite Entertainment

- Kiss (October 2016 – July 2017)
  - Kiss: The Elder Vol. 1 – A World Without Sun (tpb, 144 pages, 2017, ISBN 1-5241-0298-9) collects:
    - "Untitled" (with Kewber Ball, in #1-5, October 2016 – February 2017)
  - Kiss: The Elder Vol. 2 – Odyssey (tpb, 168 pages, 2017, ISBN 1-5241-0509-0)
    - "Untitled" (with Kewber Ball, in #6-10, March 2017 – July 2017)
- Kiss: The Demon (limited series) (January 2017 – April 2017)
  - Kiss: The Demon (tpb, 106 pages, 2017, ISBN 1-5241-0368-3) collects:
    - "Untitled" (with Erik Burnham, Eman Cassalos, in #1-4, 2017)
- Red Sonja Vol. 4 (December 2016 – Jan 2019)
  - Red Sonja: Worlds Away Vol. 1 (tpb, 144 pages, 2017, ISBN 1-5241-0376-4) collects:
    - "Untitled" (with Carlos Gomez, in #0-6, December 2016 – June 2017)
  - Red Sonja: Worlds Away Vol. 2 – Back Roads (tpb, 184 pages, 2018, ISBN 1-5241-0582-1) collects:
    - "Untitled" (with Carlos Gomez, in #7-11, July 2017 – November 2017)
  - Red Sonja: Worlds Away Vol. 3 – Hell or Hyrkania (tpb, 140 pages, 2018, ISBN 1-5241-0714-X) collects:
    - "Untitled" (with Carlos Gomez, in #12-13, December 2017 – January 2018)
    - "Untitled" (with Erik Burnham, Carlos Gomez, in #14-16, February 2018 – April 2018)
- Green Hornet Vol. 2 (March 2018 – June 2018)
  - Green Hornet Vol. 1: Generations (tpb, 128 pages, 2018, ISBN 1-5241-0796-4) collects
    - "Untitled" (with German Erramouspe, in #1-5, March 2018 – June 2018)
- Dejah Thoris Vol. 2 (January 2018 – November 2018)
  - Dejah Thoris: The Gardens of Mars (tpb, 156 pages, 2018, ISBN 1-5241-0730-1)
    - "Untitled" (with Pasquale Qualano, in #0-5, January 2018 – June 2018)
    - "Red Sonja & Vampirella Meet Betty & Veronica" (1-12, May 2019-May 2020)
    - "Red Sonja 1982" (June 2021)

DC Comics

- Sensation Comics Featuring Wonder Woman
  - Sensation Comics Featuring Wonder Woman (tpb, 168 pages, 2015, ISBN 1-4012-5862-X) collects:
    - "Untitled" (with Bernard Chang, in #7, February 2015)
- Poison Ivy: Cycle of Life and Death (January 2016 – June 2016)
  - Poison Ivy: Cycle of Life and Death (tpb, 144 pages, 2013, ISBN 1-4012-6451-4) collects:
    - "Untitled" (with Clay Mann, Seth Mann, Sandu Florea, Cliff Richards, Scott Hanna, in #1-6, 2016)
- Wonder Woman '77 Special
  - Wonder Woman '77 Special Volume 2 (tpb, 159 pages, 2017, ISBN 1-4012-6788-2) collects:
    - "Untitled" (with Dario Brizuela, in #4, September 2016)

IDW Publishing

- The X-Files (2017)
  - Deviations (tpb, 136 pages, 2016, ISBN 1-63140-675-2) collects:
    - "Time and Being" (with Silvia Califano and Elena Casagrande, oneshot, March 2016)

Image Comics

- Where We Live (2018)
  - Where We Live: A Benefit for the Survivors in Las Vegas (tpb, 336 pages, 2018, ISBN 1-5343-0822-9) collects:
    - "Jesse Slays the Dragon" (with Gabriel Hernandez Walta, May 2018)

Lion Forge Comics

- Catalyst Prime: Summit (2017 – present)
  - Summit Vol. 1: The Long Way Home (tpb, 152 pages, 2018, ISBN 1-941302-68-8) collects:
    - "Untitled" (with Jan Duursema, in #1-4, December 2017 – March 2018)

Marvel

- A Year of Marvels (2016)
  - A Year of Marvels Vol. 1 (tpb, 208 pages, 2017, ISBN 1-302-90295-4) collects:
    - "Spring Break! Ant-Man Style!" (with Ryan Browne, #3, March 2016)
- Deadpool (2015–2017)
  - Deadpool: World's Greatest Vol. 2: End Of Error (tpb, 136 pages, 2016, ISBN 0-7851-9618-8) collects:
    - "Tales of the Mercs for Money: Foolkiller" (with Emilio Laiso, in #7, April 2016)
- Secret Empire: Brave New World (2017)
  - Secret Empire: Brave New World Vol. 1 (tpb, 121 pages, 2017, ISBN 1-302-50102-X) collects:
    - "All the World's a Stage" (with Kate Niemczyk, in #4, July 2017)

Papercutz

- Ana and the Cosmic Race (graphic novel, with Kata Kane, 96 pages, 2017, ISBN 1-62991-959-4)

Valiant

- X-O Manowar (2012–2016)
  - X-O Manowar Vol. 10: Exodus (tpb, 143 pages, 2015, ISBN 1-939346-93-2) collects:
    - "The Lady Saana" (with Clayton Henry, in #38, July 2015)

Vertigo

- Vertigo Quarterly CMYK (2014–2015)
  - Vertigo Quarterly CMYK (tpb, 296 pages, 2015, ISBN 1-4012-5336-9) collects:
    - "Cyan" (with Alitha E. Martinez, June 2014)
