= Clay Mann =

American comic book artist

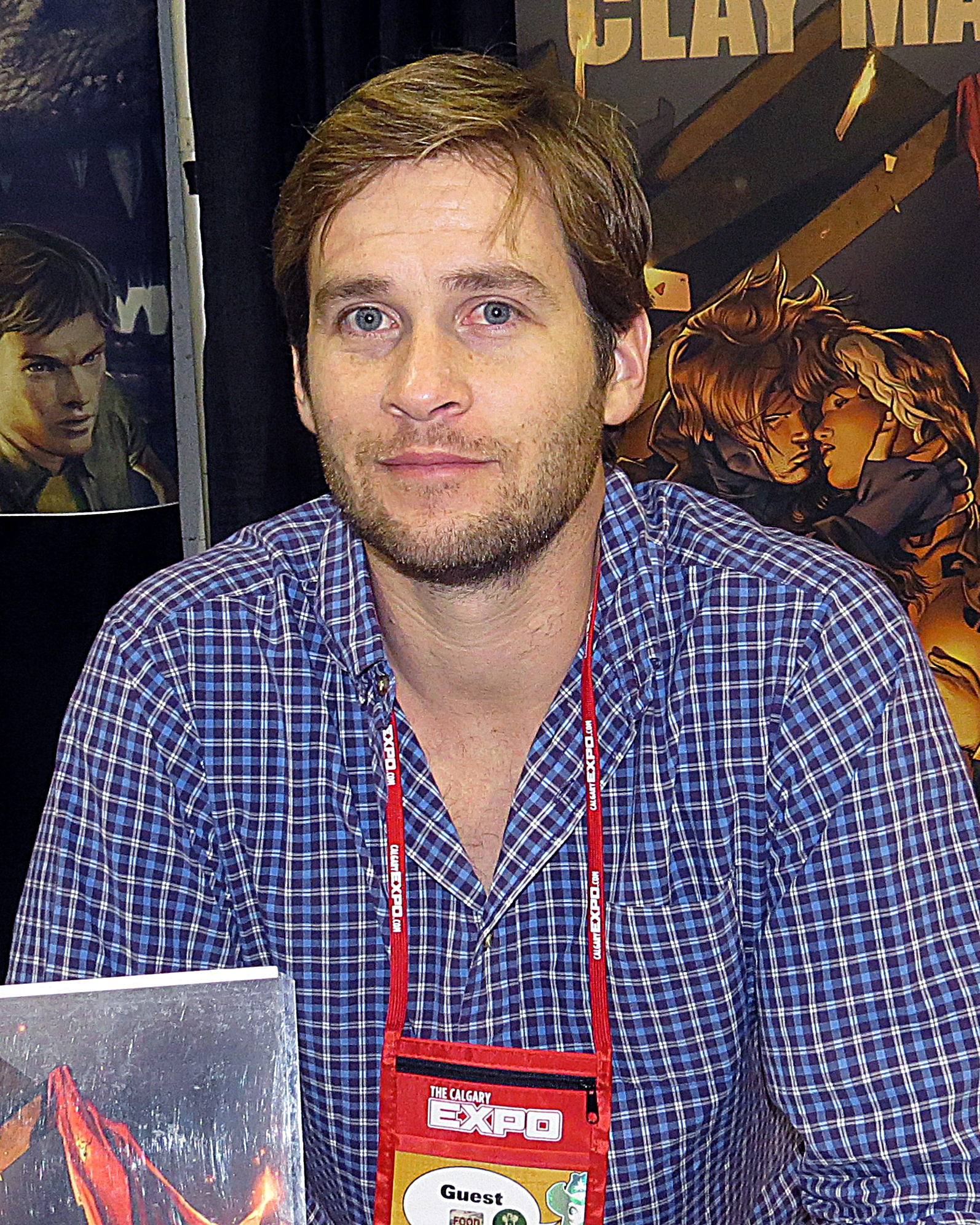
- Clay Mann in 2014
- Area: Penciller
- Notable works: X-Men: Legacy, Gambit, Heroes in Crisis

Clay Mann is an American comic book artist who has worked for Valiant, Marvel, and DC Comics. He has a twin brother named Seth Mann who works primarily as his inker.

== Bibliography ==
Interior comic work includes:

- X-Men Unlimited vol. 2 #13: "A Wonderful Life" (with Damon Hurd, anthology, Marvel, 2006)
- Four #29-30 (with Roberto Aguirre-Sacasa, Marvel, 2006)
- Marvel Adventures: Fantastic Four #21-24 (with Fred Van Lente, Marvel, 2007)
- Heroes for Hire vol. 2 #9-14 (with Zeb Wells and Alvin Lee (#14), Marvel, 2007)
- Ultimate X-Men #96: "Absolute Power, Part Three" (with Aron Eli Coleite and Brandon Peterson, Ultimate Marvel, 2008)
- The Immortal Iron Fist #14: "The Seven Capital Cities of Heaven: Round 7" (with Ed Brubaker, Matt Fraction, Kano and Tonči Zonjić, Marvel, 2008)
- Daredevil vol. 2 #111: "Lady Bullseye, Part One" (with Ed Brubaker, Marvel, 2008)
- Dark Reign: Elektra #1-5 (with Zeb Wells, Marvel, 2009)
- Thor: Man of War (with Matt Fraction and Patrick Zircher, one-shot, Marvel, 2009)
- X-Men: Legacy #231-233, 238–241, 245-247 (with Mike Carey and Tom Raney (#241), Marvel, 2010–2011)
- X-Men: Prelude to Schism #4 (with Paul Jenkins, Marvel, 2011)
- Magneto: Not a Hero #1-4 (with Skottie Young and Gabriel Hernández Walta (#2), Marvel, 2012)
- Gambit vol. 5 (with James Asmus, Marvel):
  - "Once a Thief..." (in #1-4, with Leonard Kirk (#3-4), 2012)
  - "Forever Endeavor" (with Pasqual Ferry and David Baldeon, in #8, 2013)
  - "Tombstone Blues" (in #9-12, with Leonard Kirk (#10, 12) and Paco Medina (#11), 2013)
  - "King of Thieves" (in #15-17, 2013)
- Indestructible Hulk #17: "Humanity Bomb, Part One" (with Mark Waid and Miguel Sepulveda, Marvel, 2014)
- X-Men vol. 4 #10-14: "Ghosts and Bloodlines" (with Brian Wood, Marvel, 2014)
- X-O Manowar vol. 3 #0: "To the Hilt" (with Robert Venditti, Valiant, 2015)
- Ninjak vol. 3 #1-3, 5, 9 (with Matt Kindt and Raúl Allén (#2), Valiant, 2015)
- Poison Ivy: Cycle of Life and Death #1-3, 5 (with Amy Chu and Stephen Segovia (#3, 5), DC Comics, 2016)
- Trinity vol. 2 (DC Comics):
  - "Better Together, Part Three" (with Francis Manapul, in #3, 2017)
  - "The New Pandoras" (with Cullen Bunn and Miguel Mendonça, in #7, 2017)
- Superman vol. 4 #15-16 (with Peter Tomasi and Patrick Gleason, among other artists, DC Comics, 2017)
- Batman vol. 3 #24, 27, 30, 36–37, 50, 78-79 (with Tom King and David Finch (#24), DC Comics, 2017–2019)
  - DC Nation: "Joker: Your Big Day" (with Tom King, antholoy one-shot, DC Comics, 2018)
  - Batman/Catwoman #1-12 (with Tom King, DC Comics, 2021–2022)
- Action Comics #1000: "Of Tomorrow" (with Tom King, co-feature, DC Comics, 2018)
- Heroes in Crisis #1-7, 9 (with Tom King, Lee Weeks (#3) and Mitch Gerads (#6), DC Comics, 2018–2019)

=== Covers only ===
- X-Men: Legacy #234, 259-260, 300 (Marvel, 2010–2014)
- X-Force vol. 3 #27 (Marvel, 2010)
- The New Mutants vol. 3 #22 (Marvel, 2011)
- Gambit vol. 5 #13 (Marvel, 2013)
- X-Factor #250 (Marvel, 2013)
- Wolverine and the X-Men #33 (Marvel, 2013)
- Thor: God of Thunder #19 (Marvel, 2014)
- Harley Quinn vol. 2 #1 (DC Comics, 2014)
- Batgirl vol. 4 #30, Annual #2 (DC Comics, 2014)
- Batgirl: Futures End #1 (DC Comics, 2014)
- Batman Eternal #26-30 (DC Comics, 2014)
- Avengers and X-Men: AXIS #4 (Marvel, 2015)
- Guardians Team-Up #6 (Marvel, 2015)
- Book of Death: The Fall of Ninjak #1 (Valiant, 2015)
- Teenage Mutant Ninja Turtles vol. 5 #52 (IDW Publishing, 2015)
- Star Wars: Vader Down #1 (Marvel, 2016)
- Star Wars: Darth Vader #13-15 (Marvel, 2016)
- Star Wars vol. 4 #13-14 (Marvel, 2016)
- Hercules vol. 4 #1-2 (Marvel, 2016)
- Extraordinary X-Men #3 (Marvel, 2016)
- Poison Ivy: Cycle of Life and Death #4, 6 (DC Comics, 2016)
- Action Comics #959-968, 973-974, 979-980, 983-984 (DC Comics, 2016–2017)
- Harley Quinn vol. 3 #1 (DC Comics, 2016)
- Trinity vol. 2 #4, 8, 12 (DC Comics, 2016–2017)
- Red Hood and the Outlaws vol. 2 #12 (DC Comics, 2017)
- Doom Patrol/JLA Special #1 (DC's Young Animal, 2018)
- Justice League vol. 4 #46 (DC Comics, 2020)
