= H.E.R.O. (comics) =

American comic book series

Publication information
- Publisher: DC Comics
- Schedule: Monthly
- Format: Ongoing series
- Genre: Superhero
- Publication date: April 2003 – January 2005
- No. of issues: 22

Creative team
- Written by: Will Pfeifer
- Artist(s): Kano; Leonard Kirk; Dale Eaglesham

Collected editions
- Power & Abilities: ISBN 1-4012-0168-7

H.E.R.O. is an American comic book series published by DC Comics that started in 2003 and ran for 22 issues. The series was written by Will Pfeifer. Artists included Kano, Leonard Kirk, Patrick Gleason, and Dale Eaglesham.

The series' focus was the "H-Dial" that DC had first introduced in "Dial H for Hero" in House of Mystery in the 1960s. For this series the Dial was depicted as an object with buttons instead of a dial and was referred to as the H-Device.

== Story arcs and characters ==
Unlike earlier stories, H.E.R.O. did not have one or two protagonists being turned into a new hero every issue, but showed the H-Device passing from bearer to bearer, examining how different people react to the sudden gift of supernatural powers. There was a subplot involving Robby Reed (the main character from the original Dial H for Hero) that ran through most issues and led to the series' final storyline as he tries to find the H-Device.

- Issue #1–4: Jerry Feldon, a minimum wage earner from the fictional city of Heaton, Pennsylvania, works as an ice cream vendor and soda jerk. He uses the H-Device in order to impress a co-worker named Molly. His superhero work is unsuccessful, with villains being badly hurt. After Molly is shot and injured during a robbery on the ice cream parlor that he worked at, Jerry flies into space and returns to normal in mid-air, intending to commit suicide, but is saved by Superman. Following this incident and Molly recovering, Jerry resumes his normal life and begins dating Molly.
- Issue #5: Matt Allen, the vice-president of the Chicago-based Edutech, finds and becomes obsessed with using the H-Device, which landed in front of him following Jerry Feldon's suicide attempt. In the end, his wife Claire leaves him, taking their daughter with her.
- Issue #6: Andrea Allen, the daughter of Matt Allen and Claire, finds the H-Device while leaving with her mother. She uses it with two of her friends Julie and Denise, but they begin to fight over it and lose it as a result.
- Issue #7–8: Captain Chaos, the communal code name of a group of friends named Mark, Jay, Galen, Craig, and Wayne. They use the H-Device to create a website showing them doing superpowered stunts.
- Issue #9–10: Tony Finch, a small-time Gotham City criminal whose claim to fame is that he was once a henchman for the Joker. He uses the H-Device in an effort to become a player in the Gotham City underworld, but gives it up when the Joker becomes interested in his ex-henchman and ends up remanded to Arkham Asylum.
- Issue #11: A Neanderthal from 50,000 years ago in what will become Germany finds the H-Device and become his era's version of Superman. He never transforms back; as an old man, he throws the H-Device into space and leaves Earth to go to the Moon, where he dies.
- Issue #12–14: Joe Hamill is a construction worker who found the H-Device in the building where Tony Finch was last in. He uses the H-Device to become a superpowered woman named Electro Lass. Joe loses the H-Device and becomes trapped in female form.

=== Final story arc ===
Issues #15–22 bring together all the elements presented in the previous issues. Robby Reed is the featured character as he attempts to stop a serial killer who has obtained the H-Device and gained the power to use any power he can think of. Most of the other characters from the previous story arcs are either recruited by Reed or killed by the serial killer. Robby starts by telling Jerry Feldon his past which causes his superpowers to kick in. Robby and Jerry travel to find the serial killer while avoiding the police. Robby and Jerry encounter the serial killer and fight him until the serial killer kills Jerry and escapes. Tony Finch agrees to work for the serial killer upon being sprung from Arkham Asylum. Wayne of Captain Chaos sides with Robby after the serial killer kills Mark, Jay, Galen, and Craig. After his powers kick in, Matt Allen agrees to help Robby after Andrea is captured by the serial killer. Robby and Matt rescue Andrea at the cost of Wayne's life. Tony turns against the serial killer by sacrificing himself so that Robby, Matt, and Andrea can defeat him. It is also shown that the H-Device's powers had been carried into Jerry Feldon's son. The series ends with the H-Device being sent back in time by Robby Reed, where it is found by the Neanderthal from issue #11.

== Collected editions ==
Part of the series has been collected as a trade paperback:

- Power & Abilities (collects H.E.R.O. #1-6, 144 pages, DC Comics, November 2003, ISBN 1-4012-0168-7)
