= British Amateur Press Association =

The British Amateur Press Association (BAPA) was the first Amateur Press Association in Britain. It was founded in 1890. In September 1910 it began to publish a quarterly collection of its members' publications under the title The British amateur from Bishop Auckland. This was renamed The British amateur journalist for its second issue before reverting to the earlier title in 1915. A magazine published in July 1964 by J. B. Easson of Hanworth is titled British amateur journalist: Argo. By Christmas 1965 the magazine was being published by John Atkins of Oxted. Bob Tyson of Wimborne became General Secretary and published a monthly news bulletin until at least May 1976.

Initially, largely literary and news oriented, BAPA became broader with members such as John Carnell, who published two collections of science fiction in 1945 and 1946, respectively. A collection of poetry published for the 150 members of the Association in 1972 (The Wine The Women and The Song edited by Arthur Smith of Pyle was notable for having the word 'fuck' cut out of a poem by Gerald England on the last page of every copy. In 1990 the Secretary was Mr L E Linford of Stratford, London.

== See also ==
- List of companies based in London
