= CAPA-alpha =

1964 association devoted to comic books

CAPA-alpha (sometimes abbreviated to K-a) was the first amateur press association (APA) devoted to comic books, started by Jerry Bails (the "father of comics fandom") in the United States in 1964.

== History ==
In October 1964 Bails released the first issue of comics' first dedicated APA publication. Between 1963 and 1964, "new fanzines were popping up right and left . . . [as] a lot of fans were infected by the "publishing bug," many of them talented writers and artists." In an attempt to focus these emerging talents, and head off the over-abundance of poor quality fanzines (or "crud-zines") which seemed to equal in number their good quality counterparts, Bails adapted the long-standing practice of APAs for comics, creating the first all-comics APA, "CAPA-alpha" (the first—e.g., 'alpha'—'Comics A.P.A.'). Cartoonist and fanzine publisher Johnny Chambers is credited with coming up with the title CAPA-Alpha.

This allowed the easy formulation of a fanzine, created through submissions by each of its fifty-strong membership, who could all contribute short submissions on a regular basis. Compiled in the regular APA mold by a "central mailer" (in which role Bails first served), copies of the membership's individual submissions could then be collated and mailed out to everyone. "Now," explained fandom historian Bill Schelly, "fans could get into print and retain editorial control of their material, without publishing their own fanzine."

CAPA-alpha soon grew to its present limit of fifty members, becoming along the way the archetype for most subsequent comics APAs. Besides Bails, notable members have included Mark Evanier, Carl Gafford, Fred Patten, Richard and Wendy Pini, Neal Pozner, Roy Thomas, Tony Isabella, Bob Ingersoll, Dan Alderson, Dave Kaler, Ralph Alfonso, Rick Norwood, Don Markstein, Dwight Decker, Rob Solomon, Rocky Bronstein, Tom Stern, Jim Korkis, Richard Morrissey, Harry Broertjes, Jim Chadwick, Wayne DeWald, Meloney Crawford, Gary Brown, Alan Hutchinson, Jeffrey H. Wasserman, and Don and Maggie Thompson.

In addition, Michael Barrier's animation fanzine Funnyworld started as a CAPA-alpha contribution.
