= Batman: Dying Is Easy =

2021 film by Aaron Schoenke

- Promotional poster
- Directed by: Aaron Schoenke; Sean Schoenke
- Written by: Aaron Schoenke
- Based on: Characters by Bob Kane; Bill Finger
- Produced by: Aaron Schoenke; Sean Schoenke; Nikolay Zamkovoy
- Starring: Kevin Porter; Aaron Schoenke; Michael Madsen
- Cinematography: Aric Abraham
- Edited by: Aaron Schoenke
- Music by: Sean Schoenke
- Production company: Bat in the Sun
- Distributed by: Bat in the Sun; YouTube
- Release date: March 11, 2021
- Running time: 26 minutes
- Country: United States
- Language: English
- Budget: US$75,907

Batman: Dying Is Easy is a 2021 superhero fan film directed by Aaron and Sean Schoenke, based on the Batman franchise. It stars Kevin Porter as Batman and Aaron Schoenke as the Joker. The film is the third Batman fan film by the Schoenke brothers after City of Scars (2010) and Seeds of Arkham (2011).

Batman: Dying Is Easy was crowdfunded through Indiegogo and uploaded on YouTube on March 11, 2021.

== Plot ==
While investigating the disappearance of three Gotham City Police officers, Batman raids the Mad Hatter's hideout and rescues a girl forced to dress as Alice. Two months later, he is informed by Lieutenant Harvey Bullock that the Joker is dying and wishes to see him.

Upon Batman's arrival at Arkham Asylum, the Joker tells him he is suffering from melanoma due to his chemical accident, and he wants Batman to kill him as a fitting end to his legacy. Batman walks away, but the Joker taunts him by reminding him of the death of Jason Todd and the crippling of Barbara Gordon. An enraged Batman wraps a chain around the Joker's neck and hangs him, telling him how irrelevant he has become as a criminal. With nothing left to say, the Joker confesses to murdering the three missing officers and leaving their bodies at O'Neil's Toyland. Batman lets go of the Joker, revealing that he made him confess by falsifying his toxicology report and poisoning his water supply for weeks to make him believe he had a terminal illness. In addition, Batman knew the Joker was responsible for the disappearance of the officers when he discovered a police baton with the Joker's fingerprints on it during his raid on the Mad Hatter's hideout.

As Gotham City Police recovers the corpses of the missing officers, Bullock confronts Batman over being manipulated during the Dark Knight's investigation. Before disappearing from Bullock's presence, Batman reveals that the officers were already dead from the beginning, but did not disclose that fact to take away hope so their families could heal and move on.

== Cast ==
- Kevin Porter as Bruce Wayne / Batman
- Aaron Schoenke as The Joker
- Michael Madsen as Lieutenant Harvey Bullock
- Doug Jones as the Riddler
- Chris Daughtry as Hugo Strange
- Jamie Costa as Mad Hatter
- Vera Bambi as Poison Ivy
- Amy Johnston as Harley Quinn
- Tatiana Neva as Selina Kyle / Catwoman
- Mike Estes as Mr. Freeze
- Lionel Washington III as Killer Croc
- Guy Grundy as Victor Zsasz
- Orion Acaba as Condiment King
- Amanda Lynne Shafer as Barbara Gordon
- Chalet Lizette Brannan as Little Alice
- Casper Van Dien as Commissioner James Gordon
- Jennifer Wenger as Summer Gleeson

== Possible sequel ==
A sequel Kickstarter was about to be launched, but it was put on hold following the death of Kevin Conroy, who voiced Batman in several animation and video game series for 30 years. Aaron Schoenke said that he would wait for weeks and did not want to seem like they were capitalizing on Conroy's death. This lasted until November 19, 2022, when his friend Jason David Frank died. Schoenke decided to focus on Legend of the White Dragon in honor of Frank.
