= Aaron Schoenke =

American film director

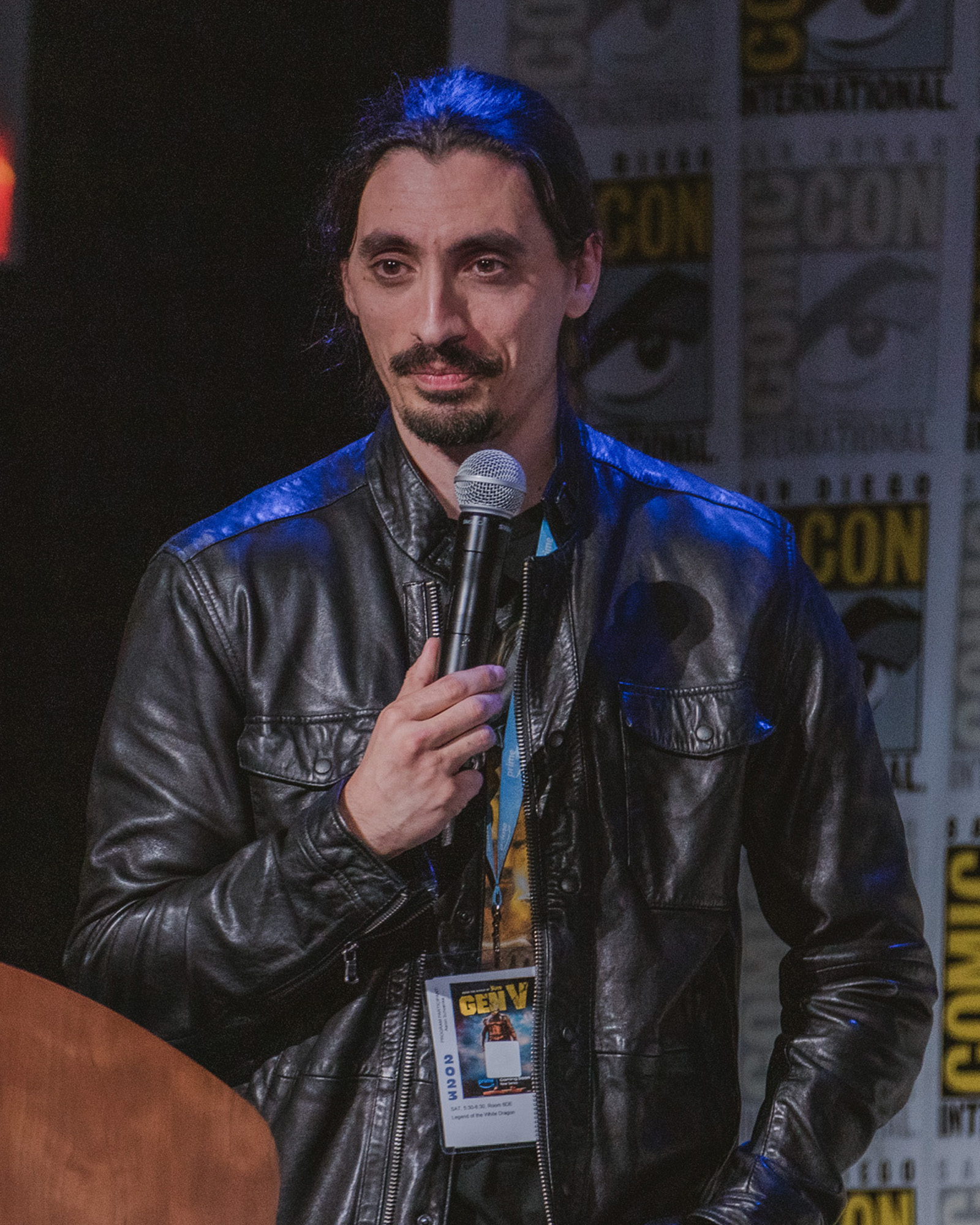
- Schoenke in 2023
- Born: Fountain Valley, California, U.S.
- Occupations: Actor; Screenwriter; Film director; Film editor; Film producer; Cinematographer
- Notable work: Super Power Beat Down; Ninjak vs The Valiant Universe

Aaron Schoenke is an American film and television actor, screenwriter, film director, film editor, film producer and cinematographer. He is known for the films Super Power Beat Down, Ninjak vs The Valiant Universe and Power Rangers: Legacy Wars: Street Fighter Showdown.

== Early life ==
Schoenke left high school early to enroll at The Art Institute of California in Los Angeles, majoring in film production. It was during this period that he began making films.

== Career ==
Schoenke is co-founder along with his father Sean, of 'Bat in the Sun Productions'. His work as a screenwriter and director of comic and sci-fi genre films has received a positive response from fans, as well as comic book and film studios. In 2018, Schoenke directed a mini-series for Valiant Digital Studios, as well as a short film for Lionsgate and Hasbro.

Schoenke has also worked as the director of the web show Super Power Beat Down, which pits fictional characters against each other and has the fans vote on who wins.

== Recognition ==
Schoenke's YouTube channel for Bat in the Sun Productions has over 2.5 million subscribers, 444 million views, and a large fanbase across social media platforms.

Super Power Beat Down won Best Reality Web Series at the 2015 and 2019 Geekie Awards. It has been nominated for several Streamy Awards including Stunt Choreography, Action or Sci-Fi Show, and Visual Special Effects.

== Filmography ==
Filmmaker

- Batman Beyond: Year One (2003)
- Dark Justice (2003)
- Patient J (2005)
- Batman Legends (2006)
- Hell Comes to Montana (2007)
- The Chronicles of Curtis Tucker: Fly for Me Now (2008)
- The Face of Purgatory (2008)
- City of Scars (2010)
- Seeds of Arkham (2011)
- Super Power Beat Down (2012–present)
- Ninjak vs. the Valiant Universe (2018)
- Power Rangers: Legacy Wars - Street Fighter Showdown (2018)
- Batman: Dying Is Easy (2021)
- Legend of the White Dragon (2026)

Actor

- Batman Beyond: Year One (2003) as Terry McGinnis / Batman Beyond
- Batman Legends (2006) as Dick Grayson / Nightwing
- The Greatest Fan Film of All Time (2008) as The Scarecrow (voice)
- Deadliest Warrior (3 episodes, 2009)
  "Apache vs. Gladiator" as Apache
  "Spartan vs. Ninja" as Spartan
  "Pirate vs. Knight" as Lead Pirate
- Seeds of Arkham (2011) as Dick Grayson / Nightwing
- Super Power Beat Down (2012–present) as Dick Grayson/ Nightwing, The Joker, Peter Parker / Spider-Man, and Terry McGinnis / Batman Beyond.
- The Amazing Spider-Man 2: The Video Game (2014) as Spider-Man (motion-capture)
- Ninjak vs. the Valiant Universe (2018) as Master Darque
- Batman: Dying Is Easy (2021) as The Joker
- Legend of the White Dragon (2026) as Jai Katua / Dragon Prime
