= Kevin Porter =

Kevin Porter may refer to:

== Sports ==
- Kevin Porter (American football) (born 1966), American football player and coach
- Kevin Porter (basketball, born 1950), American former basketball player
- Kevin Porter Jr. (born 2000), American basketball player
- Kevin Porter (ice hockey) (born 1986), American ice hockey center

== Others ==
- Kevin Porter (actor) (born 1969), American actor and director
- Kevin Porter (character), fictional school guidance counselor in the American streaming television series 13 Reasons Why

== See also ==
- Kevin Potter (disambiguation)
