= Power Rangers: Legacy Wars =

2017 video game

- Developer: nWay
- Publishers: nWay; Lionsgate Games
- Designer: Steve Kuroki
- Engine: Unity
- Platforms: iOS, Android
- Release: Android, iOS: WW: March 23, 2017
- Genres: Fighting, beat 'em up, action
- Modes: Single-player, versus multiplayer

Power Rangers: Legacy Wars is a fighting video game based on the 2017 film Power Rangers, created by San Francisco–based game developer nWay with characters from the movie and the TV show. The game was featured on Amazon, Apple's AppStore and Google Play Store. The game has been downloaded more than 50 million times.

== Plot ==
Set in the universe of the 2017 Power Rangers film, Rita Repulsa infects the Morphin Grid with a virus that brings together and corrupts all known Ranger generations. Zordon and Alpha 5 send Jason to cleanse the Morphin Grid. Jason saves various Rangers and together with them goes on to save more and takedown Rita, meeting various threats along the way. Eventually, the Rangers find a few Megazords, which they use to challenge Mega Goldar and the Black Dragon Megazord. However, Rita's power is growing, and she is able to now pull fighters from other dimensions into the Grid. She finds the remains of M. Bison and reanimates him. In return, he gives Rita his dimension to conquer. Ryu senses this, but it's too late, and he and his friends and enemies are pulled into the Morphin Grid.

== Gameplay ==
Power Rangers Legacy Wars is an online tag team-based fighting game. Players select a primary character (a leader) and two supporting characters (assists) that can be called in during combat. Players can also challenge computer players in Training Mode. Characters' move-sets are based on color-coded "cards." Each card has a different attack type: strike, defense, breaker. They work in a rock-paper-scissors form. strike beats breaker, breaker beats defense, and defense beats strike. When constructing a team, players must keep their team builds in mind, as an imbalance of cards leaves one vulnerable to counterattack (too many "strike" cards leave one vulnerable to "defense," and so forth). Players can complete challenges to win Morph Boxes and can use the earned items to upgrade their leaders and assists. Corruption Boxes can be unlocked via points earned in PvP battles.

On October 19, 2017, Megazord battles were introduced. The gameplay is nearly identical to Warrior battles, but blocking is nonexistent, replaced with defense attacks. Also, a Megazord is required to have power-ups, called "Megas" which the Megazord can access when it has dealt and/or taken enough damage. In May 2018, guest fighters Ryu, Guile, Chun-Li, Akuma, Cammy and M. Bison from the Street Fighter franchise were introduced. The following July, an original fighter known as Ryu Ranger (a morphed version of Street Fighter's Ryu) was introduced into the game. In November 2019, an original fighter known as Chun-Li Ranger (a morphed version of Street Fighter's Chun-Li) was introduced into the game.

== Power Rangers: Legacy Wars – Street Fighter Showdown ==
Power Rangers: Legacy Wars – Street Fighter Showdown is a short film co-produced by Allspark Pictures and Bat in the Sun and released on October 11, 2018, to promote the game and its Street Fighter content. It features Ryu and Chun Li teaming up Tommy Oliver the Mighty Morphin Green Ranger and Gia Moran the Yellow Megaforce Ranger to face off against M. Bison. The cast features Jason David Frank as Tommy Oliver, Ciara Hanna as Gia Moran, Peter Jang as Ryu, Gemma Nguyen as Chun-Li, and Kevin Porter as M. Bison.

== Reception ==
Erin Brereton for Common Sense Media gave the game a two out of five-star rating and commented, "The game has some positive points. Users get tips throughout the experience, and kids don't technically have to buy anything to advance levels. By playing well, they can earn currency needed to move through levels. From there, players will learn what they'll need to do to participate in alliances with other members and upgrade their Power Ranger teams' abilities. Along the way, they're encouraged to work toward achieving goals to advance, which is another positive aspect of the game. But that process will take some time; buying extra currency to speed it up may be tempting, which could frustrate kids. Generally, the game would benefit from clearer, easier-to-find instructions; users get a quick rundown when they first start to play, but if they have questions, the support section doesn't always, for example, fully explain how to get Zeo shards, an important part of advancing levels. It'd be nice, too, if the game featured other activities that weren't violent; if parents don't mind a little virtual sparring, they may be OK with their children playing the game. But if they do, there really isn't much else for kids to do in the app."
