= Kieron Elliott =

Scottish actor

Kieron Elliott is a Scottish actor. Works include voicing Hoark the Haggard in the DreamWorks’ animated blockbusters How to Train Your Dragon and How to Train Your Dragon 2, an appearance in the eighth episode of Deadliest Warrior and as a host of the show's "Aftermath", a recurring role on the BBC drama River City as Duncan Robertson, serving as a BBC Three continuity announcer, as co-host of the UK karaoke style panel game show Night Fever, helping launch the UK's first Classic Rock station on FM in 2007 96.3 Rock Radio and hosting the breakfast show for a year, as a presenter on the Real Radio radio station. He works regularly with Blizzard Entertainment voicing King Magni Bronzebeard in World of Warcraft and Hearthstone and also as the voice of Sully 'The Pickle' McLeary in World of Warcraft: Mists of Pandaria
