= Piper (video game) =

1995 educational video game

- Developer: Splash Studios
- Release: 1995
- Genre: Interactive movie

Piper is a 1995 educational interactive movie video game developed by Splash Studios. The game is essentially a Western take on the legend of the Pied Piper of Hamelin, albeit with a less spiteful Piper.

== Gameplay ==
The game merges time-sensitive puzzles with a linear storyline. Each of the four episodes give the player the option to listen to commentary on the action. The game contains six songs, which were included as a bonus audio disk.

== Plot ==
The titular Piper comes to the town of Midas Valley in the midst of an infestation of rats, led by the large rat Mephisto. The rats begin to infest the town to the point that it impedes daily life, and the townsfolk, including the owner of a run-down orphanage on the brink of closure, ask the greedy mayor for help, but he reveals he does not know what to do. The Piper, who is actually working with the rats as part of a confidence trick, offers his services to the mayor to draw the rats out of Midas Valley with a song. However, Mephisto and the rats betray him and take over the town, banishing the Piper and forcing the townsfolk into slavery in the town's gold mines in a nearby mountain. The Piper comes back to rescue the townsfolk from the mines, defeating Mephisto and the rats when their stockpile of dynamite explodes. The Piper and the townsfolk escape with the mined gold; as a token of gratitude, the mayor bestows all of the gold to the Piper, but he chooses to give it away; the orphanage owner decides to marry her boyfriend and adopt the orphans. With Midas Valley saved, the Piper leaves for adventures elsewhere.

== Development ==
It was announced on June 15, 1995 that Splash Studios had signed Mighty Morphin Power Rangers actor Jason David Frank as the titular role. He began shooting in Redmond on July 1, the day after the premiere of Mighty Morphin Power Rangers: The Movie. The 25-member cast also included veteran Jeff Harry Woolf and newcomer Sarah Wayn, and animatronic and computer-animated rats were added as the villains. The actors shot their scenes in front of a blue screen.

The game contains 3D computer graphic environments created by Silicon Graphics. The game had a budget in excess of $1 million. It contained an original screenplay and soundtrack. The CD-ROM version of the game underwent testing in August 1995. It was to be distributed through Broderbund Software's Affiliated Label Program.

A 45-minute video version of Piper was created by Splash Studios for broadcast and home video release, and the game's assets were adapted into an online adventure game titled Midas Valley Gold Rush for the Splash Kids forum on the then-upcoming MSN Games platform.

In creating this game, Splash Studios intended to create a new genre: "a movie kids can watch in episodes, punctuated by interactive games".

== Critical reception ==
The Seattle Times deemed it a "technically stunning interactive movie", and noted that their play testers enjoyed replaying scenes to learn lines of songs and sing along. The game was highly recommended by Billboard, noting that it pushed the boundaries rather than being another Living Books clone. Popular Electronics commented that the game could appeal to children of all ages.
