= List of Deadliest Warrior episodes =

This is a list of episodes for Deadliest Warrior.

== Season 1 ==
Deadliest Warrior premiered on April 7, 2009 at 10 pm ET. Nine one-hour episodes of the show were produced for Season 1. Season 1 was released on DVD and Blu-ray on May 11, 2010.

No. overall	No. in season	Title
1	1	"Apache vs. Gladiator"
Apache team: Alan Tafoya (World Champion Knife Fighter), Snake Blocker (U.S. Army Combat Instructor); Apache weapons: Tomahawk, Knife, Bow & Arrow, War Club; Apache armor: Rawhide Shield Apache statistics: Height: 5 feet 7 inches (1.70 m) Weight: 140 pounds (64 kg) Gear Weight: 10 pounds (4.5 kg) Gladiator team: Chris Torres (Ancient Weapons Specialist), Steven Dietrich (Gladiator Combat Instructor), Chuck Liddell (The Iceman); Gladiator weapons: Cestus, Scissor, Trident & Net, Sling, Sica; Gladiator armor: Murmillo Helmet and leather shield Gladiator statistics: Height: 5 feet 8 inches (1.73 m) Weight: 185 pounds (84 kg) Gear Weight: Ranges from 10 to 38 pounds (4.5 to 17.2 kg) Winner: Apache
2	2	"Viking vs. Samurai"
Viking team: Casey Hendershot (Viking Weapons Instructor), Matt Nelson (Viking Combat Expert); Viking weapons: Great Axe, Long Sword, Spear, Shield; Viking armor: Steel helmet, Chainmail, Wooden Shield Viking statistics: Height: 5 feet 11 inches (1.80 m) Weight: 180 pounds (82 kg) Gear Weight: 65 pounds (29 kg) Samurai team: Tetsuro Shigematsu (Samurai Descendant), Brett Chan (Samurai Weapons Expert); Samurai weapons: Katana, Naginata, Yumi, Kanabo; Samurai armor: Kabuto, Dō-maru Samurai statistics: Height:5 feet 3 inches (1.60 m) Weight: 135 pounds (61 kg) Gear Weight: 65 pounds (29 kg) Winner: Samurai
3	3	"Spartan vs. Ninja"
Spartan team: Jeremy Dunn (Spartan Weapons Expert), Barry Jacobsen (Spartan Historian); Spartan weapons: Short Sword, Spear, Javelin, Shield; Spartan armor: Bronze Cuirass, Corinthian helmet, Bronze-coated Shield Spartan statistics: Height: 5 feet 8 inches (1.73 m) Weight: 165 pounds (75 kg) Gear Weight: 60 pounds (27 kg) Ninja team: Lou Klein (Ninjitsu Master), Michael Lehr (Martial Arts Expert); Ninja weapons: Ninjato, Black Eggs, Shuriken, Blowgun, Kusarigama; Ninja armor: None Ninja statistics: Height: 5 feet 2 inches (1.57 m) Weight: 135 pounds (61 kg) Gear Weight: 10 pounds (4.5 kg) Winner: Spartan
4	4	"Pirate vs. Knight"
Pirate team: Michael Triplett (Pirate Weapons Master), David Hernandez (Sword Fighting Instructor); Pirate weapons: Cutlass, Boarding Axe, Blunderbuss, Flintlock Pistol, Grenado; Pirate armor: None Pirate statistics: Height: 5 feet 10 inches (1.78 m) Weight: 170 pounds (77 kg) Gear Weight: 20 pounds (9.1 kg). In addition, a chronological date for the Pirate is listed as the year 1715. Knight team: David Coretti (Army Veteran/Sword Expert), Josh Paugh (Medieval Weapons Expert); Knight weapons: Broadsword, Halberd, Crossbow, Morningstar; Knight armor: Plate Armor Knight statistics: Height: 5 feet 11 inches (1.80 m) Weight: 180 pounds (82 kg) Gear Weight: 70 pounds (32 kg). In addition, a chronological date for the Knight is given as the year 1423. Winner: Pirate
5	5	"Yakuza vs. Mafia"
Yakuza team: Zero Kazama (Yakuza Weapons Expert), David Kono (Yakuza Descendant/Historian); Yakuza weapons: Nunchakus, Walther P38, Sten Gun, Ceramic Grenade, Sai; Yakuza armor: None Yakuza statistics: Height: 5 feet 6 inches (1.68 m) Weight: 150 pounds (68 kg) Gear Weight: 10 pounds. In addition, a chronological date for the Yakuza featured in this episode is given as the year 1947. Mafia team: Joe Ferrante (Mafia Weapons Expert), Thomas Bonanno (Mafia Descendant/Historian); Mafia weapons: Baseball bat, Sawed-off shotgun, Tommy gun, Molotov cocktail, ice pick Mafia armor: None Mafia statistics: Height: 5 feet 10 inches (1.78 m) Weight: 170 pounds (77 kg) Gear Weight: 10 pounds. In addition, a chronological date for the episode's Mafia is given as the year 1929. Winner: Mafia
6	6	"Green Berets vs. Spetsnaz"
Green Beret team: Matt Anderson (former Green Beret), Sgt. George Gomez (Former Green Beret); Green Beret weapons: Beretta Pistol, Mossberg Shotgun, M4A1 Carbine, M24 Rifle, M67 grenade, E-Tool; Green Beret armor: None Green Beret statistics: Height: 6 feet 1 inch (1.85 m) Weight: 180 pounds (82 kg) Gear Weight: 29 pounds (13 kg). In addition, a force size of 4,500 soldiers is given. Spetsnaz team: Sonny Puzikas (Former Spetsnaz Operative), Maxim Franz (Former Spetsnaz Operative); Spetsnaz weapons: Makarov Pistol, Saiga Shotgun, AK-74 Carbine, Dragunov Rifle, RGD-5 Grenade, Ballistic knife Spetsnaz armor: None Speztnaz statistics: Height: 5 feet 11 inches (1.80 m) Weight: 175 pounds (79 kg) Gear Weight: 27 pounds (12 kg). In addition, a force size of 15,000 soldiers is given. Winner: Spetsnaz
7	7	"Shaolin Monk vs. Maori Warrior"
Shaolin Monk team: Eric Chen (Kung Fu Master/Historian), Wang Wei (Wushu National Champion), Alfred Hsing (Chinese Weapons Expert); Shaolin Monk weapons: Emei Piercers, Staff, Twin Hooks, Whip Chain; Shaolin Monk armor: None Shaolin Monk statistics: Height: 5 feet 7 inches (1.70 m) Weight: 145 pounds (66 kg) Gear Weight: 5 pounds (2.3 kg) Maori Warrior team: Seamus Fitzgerald (Maori Weapons Historian), Jared Wihongi (Special Forces Instructor), Sala Baker (Maori Weapons Specialist); Maori Warrior weapons: Mere, Taiaha, Stingray Spear, Shark Tooth Club; Maori Warrior armor: None Maori Warrior statistics: Height: 5 feet 9 inches (1.75 m) Weight: 180 pounds (82 kg) Gear Weight: 8 pounds (3.6 kg) Winner: Shaolin Monk
8	8	"William Wallace vs. Shaka Zulu"
William Wallace team: Kieron Elliott (Highlander Weapons Expert), Anthony Delongis (Blademaster); William Wallace weapons: War Hammer, Claymore, Ball & Chain, Targe & Dirk; William Wallace armor: Chainmail William Wallace statistics: Gear Weight: 40 pounds (18 kg). William Wallace's height and weight are not listed. Wallace's lifetime of circa 1270–1305 is listed, making him roughly 34–35 years old at the time of his death; he did not die of natural causes, being executed by hanging, drawing and quartering on the order of King Edward I of England. Shaka Zulu team: Earl White (Zulu Stick Fighting Master), Jason Bartley (Zulu Combat Expert); Shaka Zulu weapons: Zulu Axe, Iklwa & Ishlangu, Iwisa, Spit of Poison; Shaka Zulu armor: None Shaka Zulu statistics: Gear Weight: Ranges between 7 pounds (3.2 kg) to 10 pounds (4.5 kg). Shaka Zulu's height and weight are not listed. Shaka Zulu's lifetime of 1787–1828 is listed, giving him a lifetime of 40–41 years at death; he did not die of natural causes, being assassinated by his half-brothers. Winner: William Wallace
9	9	"I.R.A. vs. Taliban"
I.R.A. team: Skoti Collins (I.R.A. Descendant/Historian), Peter Crowe (I.R.A. Weapons Expert); I.R.A. weapons: Slingshot, LPO-50 Flamethrower, AR-15 Armalite, Nail Bomb; I.R.A. armor: None I.R.A. statistics: Height: 5 feet 11 inches (1.80 m) Weight: 180 pounds (82 kg) Gear Weight: 30 pounds (14 kg) Taliban team: Fahim Fazli (Mujahideen Freedom Fighter), Alex Sami (Counter-Terrorism Specialist); Taliban weapons: Bayonet, RPG-7 Rocket Launcher, AK-47 Assault Rifle, PMN mine Taliban armor: None Taliban statistics: Height: 5 feet 9 inches (1.75 m) Weight: 160 pounds (73 kg) Gear Weight: 30 pounds (14 kg) Winner: I.R.A.

=== Back for Blood special ===
No. overall	No. in season	Title
SP	—	"Back for Blood"
The ancient elimination block included the Apache, Samurai, Spartan, Shaolin Monk, and William Wallace. The modern elimination block included the Pirate, Mafia, Spetznaz, and IRA. The Spetsnaz were selected as the most disciplined warrior of the modern era, while the IRA was deemed the most "unpredictable" of the group. Due to the weapon disadvantage, two more IRA weapons were tested to pair up against two existing Spetznaz weapons. Spartan representative: Barry Jacobsen (Spartan Historian); Spartan weapons: Short Sword, Spear, Javelin, Shield Samurai representative: Tetsuro Shigematsu (Samurai Descendant); Samurai weapons: Katana, Naginata, Yumi, Kanabo Ancient Winner: Spartan I.R.A. representative: Skoti Collins (I.R.A. Descendant/Historian); I.R.A. weapons: Webley Revolver, LPO-50 Flamethrower, AR-15 Armalite, HK G3 Sniper Rifle, Nail Bomb, Slingshot Spetsnaz representative: Sonny Puzikas (Former Spetsnaz Operative); Spetsnaz weapons: Makarov Pistol, Saiga Shotgun, AK-74 Carbine, Dragunov Rifle, RGD-5 Grenade, Ballistic Knife Modern winner: Spetsnaz

== Season 2 ==
Season 2 premiered April 20, 2010, at 10 pm ET.

=== Episode 10: SWAT vs. GSG 9 ===
SWAT team: Jon Darrah (9 Year SWAT Veteran), Steve Gordon (Metro SWAT Operator)
SWAT weapons: Benelli M4 Shotgun, LWRC PSD Rifle, Remington 700 Sniper Rifle, Taser Shockwave
SWAT armor: Kevlar Vest, Combat helmet

GSG 9 team: Michael Nagel (Former German Infantry), Damien Puckler (GSG 9 Combat Instructor)
GSG 9 weapons: Remington 870 Shotgun, HK G36, HK PSG1 Sniper Rifle, Stingball grenade
GSG 9 armor: Kevlar Vest, Gefechtshelm Schuberth B826 Helmet

Winner: SWAT

=== Episode 11: Attila the Hun vs. Alexander the Great ===
Attila the Hun team: Robert Borsos (Mounted Weapon Specialist), Sean Pennington (Ancient Combat Specialist)
Attila the Hun weapons: Sword of Mars, Lasso, Hunnic Composite Bow, Scythian Axe
Attila the Hun armor: Leather Lamellar

Alexander the Great team: Peter Van Rossum (Sword & Shield Champion), Kendall Wells (Bladed Weapon Specialist), Rashad Evans (Former UFC Champion)
Alexander the Great weapons: Kopis, Xyston, Gastraphetes, Ballista
Alexander the Great armor: Bronze Cuirass, Chalcidian helmet, Bronze Shield

Winner: Attila the Hun

=== Episode 12: Jesse James vs. Al Capone ===
Jesse James team: Joey Dillon (Champion Gunslinger), J.W. Wiseman (Sharpshooting Expert)
Jesse James weapons: Bowie Knife, Colt Revolvers, Winchester Rifle, Pistol Whip
Jesse James armor: None

Al Capone team: Meyer Lansky II (Mafioso Descendant), Johnny Lew Fratto (Capone Authority)
Al Capone weapons: Stiletto, Tommy Gun, Pineapple Bomb, Brass Knuckles
Al Capone armor: None

Winner: Jesse James Gang

=== Episode 13: Aztec Jaguar vs. Zande Warrior ===
Aztec Jaguar team: David Lavera (Aztec Descendant/Martial Artist), Éder Saúl López (Aztec Combat Historian)
Aztec Jaguar weapons: Tecpatl, Maquahuitl, Tlacochtli & Atlatl, Tematlatl
Aztec Jaguar armor: Wooden helmet, Ichcahuipilli tunic, Jaguar skin, Chimalli shield

Zande Warrior team: Coley Mustafa Speaks (Zande Combat Specialist), Gordon Jock (Zande Weapons Expert)
Zande Warrior weapons: Makraka, Makrigga, Kpinga, Botto & Pima
Zande Warrior armor: Kube shield

Winner: Zande Warrior

=== Episode 14: Nazi Waffen SS vs. Viet Cong ===
Nazi Waffen SS team: Silvio Wolf Busch (Former German Military), Robert Wilhelm-McCain (German Military Historian)
Nazi Waffen SS weapons: Mauser C-96 Pistol, MP 28, Bouncing Betty, Flammenwerfer 41
Nazi Waffen SS armor: M-35 Steel Helmet (cammoflaged)

Viet Cong team: Tuan Nguyen (Vietnam War Survivor), Danny Boyer (Viet Cong Weapons Expert)
Viet Cong weapons: Tokarev TT-33 Pistol, MAT-49, POMZ-2 & F-1 Grenade, Punji Stakes
Viet Cong armor: None

Winner: Nazi Waffen SS

=== Episode 15: Roman Centurion vs. Rajput Warrior ===
Roman Centurion team: Terence Rotolo (Ancient Combat Specialist), Matt Lasky (Roman Weapons Historian)
Roman Centurion weapons: Gladius, Pilum, Scorpion, Dolabra
Roman Centurion armor: Lorica Hamata, Galea, Scutum

Rajput Warrior team: Gugun Deep Singh (Rajput Descendant/Weapons Expert), Bhajneet Singh (Gatka Martial Artist), Sukhwinder Singh (Aara Expert)
Rajput Warrior weapons: Khanda, Aara, Chakram, Katar
Rajput Warrior armor: Coat of 10000 Nails, Steel Helmet, Steel Shield

Winner: Rajput Warrior

=== Episode 16: Somali Pirates vs. Medellin Cartel ===
Somali Pirate team: Abdi Ali (Somali Native/Army Veteran), Haji Ukajh (Somali Refugee/Weapons Expert)
Somali Pirate weapons: Grappling Hook, AK-47, PKM Machine Gun, RPG-7
Somali Pirate armor: None

Medellin Cartel team: Michael Corleone Blanco (Son of Medellin Cartel Boss), Kenny "Kenji" Gallo (Former Cocaine Smuggler)
Medellin Cartel weapons: Machete, Mini Uzi, M60 Machine Gun, Car Bomb
Medellin Cartel armor: None

Winner: Somali Pirates

=== Episode 17: Persian Immortal vs. Celt ===
Persian Immortal team: Ardeshir Radpour (Persian Historian/Equestrian), Cyrus Zahiri (Persian Sword Master)
Persian Immortal weapons: Sagaris, Spear, Bow & Arrow, Chariot Scythe
Persian Immortal armor: Bronze Scale & Wicker Shield

Celt team: Francis Brebner (Highland Games Champion), Spencer Dinnean (Celtic Warrior Descendant), Dave Baker (Blade Master)
Celt weapons: Long Sword, Lancea, Sling, Burda
Celt armor: Mail, Leather Belt & Wood Shield

Winner: Persian Immortal

=== Episode 18: K.G.B. vs. C.I.A. ===
K.G.B. team: Pavel Ksendz (K.G.B. Operator Descendant), Stass Klassen (Former Russian Military)
K.G.B. weapons: Shoe Knife, Camera Gun, Skorpion SMG-61, Dead Drop Spike
K.G.B. armor: None

C.I.A. team: Mike Baker (Former C.I.A. Agent), Frank Dowse (Former Defense Intelligence)
C.I.A. weapons: Garrote, Briefcase Gun, MAC-10, Exploding Cigar
C.I.A. armor: None

Winner: C.I.A.

=== Episode 19: Vlad the Impaler vs. Sun Tzu ===
Vlad the Impaler team: Vaclav Havlik (Medieval Sword Master), Brahm Gallagher (Vlad Historian)
Vlad the Impaler weapons: Kilij, Halberd, Steel Crossbow, Hand Cannon
Vlad the Impaler armor: Plated mail, Steel Helmet, Steel Shield

Sun Tzu team: Johnny Yang (Chinese Martial Arts Champ), Tommy Leng (Ancient Chinese Weapons Expert)
Sun Tzu weapons: Jian, Zhua, Repeating crossbow, Flaming Arrows
Sun Tzu armor: Leather Lamellar, Bronze Helmet

Winner: Vlad the Impaler

=== Episode 20: Ming Warriors vs. French Musketeers ===
Ming Warrior team: Jonathan Weizhang Wang (Kung Fu World Champion), Phillip Dang (Combative Wushu Champion)
Ming Warrior weapons: Dao, 3-Barrel Pole Gun, Nest of Bees, Mechanical Landmine
Ming Warrior armor: Leather Lamellar

French Musketeer team: Xavier Declie (French Combat Historian), Luke Lafontaine (Sword Master)
French Musketeer weapons: Rapier & Main Gauche, Wheel Lock Pistol, Flintlock Musket, Grenade
French Musketeer armor: Steel Cuirass

Winner: French Musketeers

=== Episode 21: Comanche vs. Mongol ===
Comanche team: Joaquin Gonzalez (Comanche Horseman), Jay Redhawk (Master Horse Archer)
Comanche weapons: War Hawk, War Lance, Bow & Arrow, Scalping Knife
Comanche armor: Hair pipe Breastplate, Buffalo Hide Shield

Mongol team: Munkhtur Luvsanjambaa (Native Mongol Historian), Jason Nguyen (Asian Combat Expert)
Mongol weapons: Flanged Mace, Glaive, Bow & Arrow, Ild
Mongol armor: Leather Lamellar, Leather Shield

Winner: Comanche

=== Episode 22: Navy SEALs vs. Israeli Commandos ===
Navy SEAL team: Rob Roy (22 Year SEAL Veteran), Colin Palmer (Former SEAL Explosives Expert)
Navy SEAL weapons: Recon 1 Knife, SIG Sauer P226, M4 Colt Commando, C4
Navy SEAL armor: Combat helmet

Israeli Commando team: Moti Horenstein (Israeli Special Forces Instructor), Mike Kanarek (Israeli Special Forces Veteran)
Israeli Commando weapons: KA-BAR Knife, Glock 19, Micro Galil, Semtex
Israeli Commando armor: KASDA helmet

Winner: Navy SEALs

== Season 3 ==
Shortly after the season 2 finale, season 3 was announced on Spike.com, followed shortly after by a live Aftermath featuring new host Richard "Mack" Machowicz answering fan questions. Season 3 premiered on July 20, 2011 at 10 pm ET. The battle simulator (created by host Robert Daly, who replaced Max Geiger) now simulates 5,000 battles as opposed to the previous 1,000. The new format (except for Vampires vs. Zombies) is a squad on squad battle of 5 vs. 5 (reserved only for modern matches in past seasons). An average of 100 different X-factors are now factored into each simulation, each being rated on a scale from 1 to 100 (though only a few are mentioned).

=== Episode 23: George Washington vs. Napoleon Bonaparte ===
George Washington team: Paul Suda (18th Century Weapons Expert), Wayne Lee, PhD (Professor of Military History)
George Washington weapons: Colichemarde Sword, Brown Bess Flintlock Musket & Pennsylvania Long Rifle, 6 Pound Cannon
George Washington tactics: Hybrid Warfare

Napoleon Bonaparte team: Mathew Cape (19th Century Weapons Expert), Phillipe Simon (Napoleonic Historian)
Napoleon Bonaparte weapons: Cavalry Saber, 1777 Charleville Musket, 8 Pound Cannon
Napoleon Bonaparte tactics: "Bait and Bash"

Winner: George Washington

=== Episode 24: Joan of Arc vs. William the Conqueror ===
Joan of Arc team: Claire Dodin (15th Century Weapons Expert), Timothy Pickles (Military Historian)
Joan of Arc weapons: French Arming Sword, Steel Crossbow, Siege Cannon
Joan of Arc armor: Plate Armor
Joan of Arc tactics: "Audacious Attack"

William the Conqueror team: Jason McNeil (Medieval Combat Specialist), Stephen Morillo, PhD (Chair, Wabash College)
William the Conqueror weapons: Norman Broadsword, Composite Crossbow, Torsion Catapult
William the Conqueror armor: Chain Mail Hauberk
William the Conqueror tactics: Feigned Retreat

Winner: Joan of Arc

=== Episode 25: U.S. Army Rangers vs. North Korean Special Ops ===
U.S. Army Ranger team: Staff Sgt. Tim Kennedy (U.S. Army Ranger), Lt. Col. John Lock [ret] (U.S. Army Ranger/Historian)
U.S. Army Ranger weapons: M4 Assault Rifle, SR-25 Sniper Rifle, Claymore Mine
U.S. Army Ranger hand-to-hand combat: Special Operations Combatives Program

North Korean Special Ops team: Charles Joh (SWAT CDR/Tactics Specialist), Ji Jay Kim (Fmr South Korean Marine), Thomas Rix (Fmr U.S. Intelligence Officer), Grand Master Ho Jin Song (9th Degree Black Belt)
North Korean Special Ops weapons: Type 68 AKM, PSL, Anti-Personnel Box Mine
North Korean Special Ops hand-to-hand combat: Hapkido and Tae-kwon-do hybrid

Winner: U.S. Army Rangers

=== Episode 26: Genghis Khan vs. Hannibal ===
Genghis Khan team: Khosbayar (U.S. Marine & Mongol Weapons Expert), Timothy May, PhD (Author, "The Mongol Art of War")
Genghis Khan weapons: Turko-Mongol Saber, Jida Lance, Recurve Bow
Genghis Khan armor: Lamellar Armor
Genghis Khan tactics: Feigned Retreat

Hannibal team: Bryan Forrest (Classical Weapons Specialist), Patrick Hunt, PhD (Professor of Archaeology, Stanford)
Hannibal weapons: Falcata, Soliferrum, War elephant
Hannibal armor: Musculata Armor
Hannibal tactics: Double Envelopment

Winner: Genghis Khan

=== Episode 27: Saddam Hussein vs. Pol Pot ===
Saddam Hussein team: Sabah Khodada (Former Iraqi Army General), Calvin Bondley (Saddam Weapons Specialist), Lt. Col. Rick Francona [ret] (Former U.S.A.F. & C.I.A. Agent)
Saddam Hussein weapons: Combat Knife, Browning Semi-Automatic Pistol, RPK Light Machine Gun, RGD-5 Grenade

Pol Pot team: Jonathan Khan (Pol Pot Weapons Expert), Kilong Ung (Cambodian genocide Survivor)
Pol Pot weapons: Cane knife, Tokarev TT-33, RPD Light Machine Gun, Chinese Stick Grenade

Winner: Saddam Hussein

=== Episode 28: Theodore Roosevelt vs. Lawrence of Arabia ===
Theodore Roosevelt Team: Gsgt. Quay Terry [ret] (United States Marine Corps), Gary Harper (Military Historian/Armorer)
Theodore Roosevelt Weapons: Bowie Hunter, 1896 Krag Carbine, Gatling Gun
Theodore Roosevelt Tactics: "Suppress & Slaughter"

Lawrence of Arabia Team: Richard Reid (British Firearms Specialist), Gavin Scott (T. E. Lawrence Historian)
Lawrence of Arabia Weapons: Jambiya Dagger, Short Magazine Lee–Enfield Rifle, Vickers machine gun
Lawrence of Arabia Tactics: "Phantom Army"

Winner: Theodore Roosevelt

=== Episode 29: Ivan the Terrible vs. Hernán Cortés ===
Ivan the Terrible Team: Vladimir Orlov (Russian Special Forces Trainer), Andrew Jenks, PhD (Professor of Russian Studies)
Ivan the Terrible Weapons: Sablia, Bardiche, Pishcal
Ivan the Terrible Armor: Plated mail, Fluted helmet

Hernán Cortés Team: Jason Heck (16th Century Weapons Expert), Kyle Lopez (Spanish Colonial Expert)
Hernán Cortés Weapons: Espada ropera, Alabarda, Arquebus
Hernán Cortés Armor: Steel Breastplate, Tassets, Morion helmet

Winner: Hernán Cortés

=== Episode 30: Crazy Horse vs. Pancho Villa ===
Crazy Horse Team: Moses Brings Plenty (Lakota Tribesman/Firearms Expert), Delano "Blu" Eagle (Fmr U.S. Marine/Lakota Tribesman)
Crazy Horse Weapons: Inyankapemni Club, 1873 Colt, 1860 Henry Repeating Rifle
Crazy Horse Tactics: Hit and Run

Pancho Villa Team: Fernando Vazquez (Expert Marksman/Horseman), Santiago Villalobos (Villa Folklore Historian)
Pancho Villa Weapons: Bolo knife, Colt Bisley, 1894 Winchester Repeating Rifle
Pancho Villa Tactics: El Golpe Terrifico

Winner: Pancho Villa

=== Episode 31: French Foreign Legion vs. Gurkhas ===
French Foreign Legion Team: Cpl. Nick Hughes [ret] (FFL Recon Diver/Commando), Geoff Wawro, PhD (French Foreign Legion Historian)
French Foreign Legion Weapons: Camillus, MAS-36 Rifle, Browning Automatic Rifle
French Foreign Legion Tactics: Active Defense

Gurkha Team: Sgt. Rastra Rai [ret] (20-Year Gurkha Soldier), Lt. John Conlin [ret] (Former Gurkha Commander)
Gurkha Weapons: Kukri, Enfield No. 4 Rifle, Bren light machine gun
Gurkha Tactics: Improvised Ambush

Winner: Gurkhas

=== Episode 32: Vampire vs. Zombie ===
Vampire Team: Steve Niles (Screenwriter, 30 Days of Night), Scott Bowen (Author, The Vampire Survival Guide)
Vampire Weapons": Vampire Bite, Claws

Zombie Team: Max Brooks (Author, World War Z), Matt Mogk (Founder, Zombie Research Society)
Zombie "Weapons": Zombie Bite, Hands

Winner: Vampires
