= The Unauthorized Melrose Place Story =

- Written by: Dana Schmalenberg
- Directed by: Mark Griffiths
- Starring: Dan Castellaneta; Adam Korson; Ali Cobrin; Brandon Barash; Joseph Coleman; Rebecca Dalton; Ciara Hanna; Frank Bailey; Ryan Bruce; Chelsea Hobbs; Chloe McClay; Teagan Vincze; Karissa Tynes; Peter Benson
- Composer: Michael Richard Plowman
- Countries of origin: United States; Canada
- Original language: English

Production
- Producers: Howard Braunstein; Ian Hay; Michael G. Larkin
- Cinematography: Eric J. Goldstein
- Editor: Lara Mazur
- Running time: 86 minutes
- Production company: Michael G. Larkin Productions

Original release
- Network: Lifetime
- Release: October 10, 2015

The Unauthorized Melrose Place Story is a 2015 television drama film directed by Mark Griffiths and written by Dana Schmalenberg. The film stars Ciara Hanna, Frank Rose Bailey IV, Ryan Bruce, Chloe McClay, Chelsea Hobbs, Joseph John Coleman and Brandon Barash. The film premiered on Lifetime on October 10, 2015.

== Premise ==
The film centers around the cast, creation and back story of the 1992–1999 TV series.

== Cast ==
- Dan Castellaneta as Aaron Spelling
- Adam Korson as Darren Star
- Ali Cobrin as Daphne Zuniga
- Brandon Barash as Thomas Calabro
- Joseph Coleman as Doug Savant
- Rebecca Dalton as Courtney Thorne-Smith
- Ciara Hanna as Heather Locklear
- Frank Rose Bailey IV as Andrew Shue
- Ryan Bruce as Grant Show
- Chelsea Hobbs as Laura Leighton
- Chloe McClay as Josie Bissett
- Teagan Vincze as Marcia Cross
- Ryan Kennedy as Larry
- Karissa Tynes as Vanessa A. Williams
- Peter Benson as Charles Pratt Jr.
- Brendan Beiser as Frank South
- Michael Patrick Denis as Lucas Miller
- Lini Evans as Candy Spelling
- Angela Galanopoulos as Susan Edelman
- Steven Jeays as Steve
- Lanie McAuley as Amy Locane
- Bri Neal as Bri
- Iris Paluly as Merry Donner
- Abby Ross as Tori Spelling
- Madison Smith as Stephen Dale (Stephen Fanning)
