= City of Scars =

2010 film by Aaron Schoenke

- Promotional poster
- Directed by: Aaron Schoenke
- Written by: Aaron Schoenke
- Based on: Characters by Bob Kane; Bill Finger
- Produced by: Aaron Schoenke; Sean Schoenke
- Starring: Kevin Porter; Paul Molnar; Christopher Parker; Guy Grundy
- Cinematography: Aaron Schoenke
- Edited by: Aaron Schoenke
- Music by: Sean Schoenke
- Production company: Bat in the Sun
- Release date: June 17, 2010
- Running time: 30 minutes
- Country: United States
- Language: English

City of Scars, also known as Batman: City of Scars, is a 2010 superhero fan film produced by Aaron and Sean Schoenke, starring Kevin Porter as Batman, and based on the Batman franchise. The film had a budget of $27,000 and was shot in 21 days. The 30-minute short film is partly set in Arkham Asylum.

City of Scars was followed by the 2011 sequel Seeds of Arkham and the 2021 film Batman: Dying Is Easy.

== Plot ==
The Joker escapes from Arkham Asylum, spraying Joker venom in a nurse's face as he runs and putting her in intensive care. Upon arriving in Gotham City, he kidnaps Councilman Johnson and his son shortly after brutally murdering the Councilman's wife. Determined not to let his archenemy kill anyone else, Batman hunts him through the city. After Councilman Johnson is found dead while his son remains in The Joker's captivity, Batman questions whether his crusade against evil does more bad than good. Batman tracks The Joker to a carnival, where he thwarts the villain's plot of bombing a ferris wheel. He then races to the location of The Joker and the councilman's son, but when the young boy kills The Joker with his own gun, Batman debates if his greatest nemesis' death is a step toward Gotham's peace, or rather a sign that things are getting worse.

== Cast ==
- Kevin Porter as Batman/Bruce Wayne
- Paul Molnar as The Joker
- Christopher Parker as Detective Crispus Allen
- Guy Grundy as Victor Zsasz
- Katie Joy Horwitch as Renee Montoya
- Jay Caputo as Arnold Wesker/Scarface
- Madelynn Rae as Harleen Quinzel/Harley Quinn
- Tess Kielhamer as Black Canary

== Background ==
Filmmaker Aaron Schoenke is a long-time Batman fan, having earlier created two fan film shorts about the subject: Patient J in 2005 and Batman Legends in 2006.
