= Blood Lake: Attack of the Killer Lampreys =

2014 American TV film

- DVD cover
- Also known as: Blood Lake
- Written by: Anna Rasmussen; Delondra Williams
- Directed by: James Cullen Bressack
- Starring: Shannen Doherty; Jason Brooks; Christopher Lloyd; Ciara Hanna; Fred Stoller; Rachel True; Zack Ward
- Music by: Steven R. Bernstein
- Country of origin: United States
- Original language: English

Production
- Producers: David Michael Latt; David Rimawi; Paul Bales
- Editors: Daniel Duncan; Rob Pallatina
- Running time: 87 minutes

Original release
- Network: Animal Planet
- Release: May 25, 2014

Blood Lake: Attack of the Killer Lampreys is a 2014 American science fiction horror film directed by James Cullen Bressack and starring Shannen Doherty, Jason Brooks, Christopher Lloyd, Ciara Hanna, Fred Stoller, Rachel True, Jeremy Wade, and Zack Ward. The film was distributed by The Asylum. It premiered on the Animal Planet cable TV channel (US) on Sunday May 25, 2014, at 8:00 p.m. EST and was released to DVD the following Tuesday.

== Plot ==
Ted Jargenson, a city maintenance employee, is checking on a remote roadside pipe when he is attacked and killed by several hungry lampreys.

About a week later, Michael Parker, his wife Cate, daughter Nicole and son Kyle move to a small lakeside town for the summer. Michael, tasked with controlling the lamprey population in Lake Charlevoix, meets the local fish and wildlife department, consisting of Will, Rich, and Marcy. They inform him that these lampreys seem to be feeding aggressively on the fish population, effectively destroying it. The mayor, Bruce Akerman, demands that Michael fix the problem so that the town can continue to enjoy the tourist revenue.

When Rich sets out on the lake to get a lamprey count, he is killed by the lampreys. His body is found and brought to the morgue. The lampreys burst out from his corpse and kill the coroner, before escaping into the pipes and infiltrating the water system. Despite the deaths, Akerman refuses to shut down the lake. Michael talks to the press in an attempt to warn people. Akerman gets Michael fired in retaliation.

Nicole soon starts a summer fling with local pool boy Alex. Ellen, the Parkers' neighbor, asks Alex to clean her pool as she is out running errands. She intends to seduce Alex by surprising him in the pool. Alex invites Nicole with him to Ellen's house, and the two finds Ellen's body in the pool being devoured by lampreys. Hearing their screams, Cate runs next door and calls the police. An officer arrives and he's promptly eaten by the lampreys in the pool, which allows Cate, Nicole, and Alex to escape.

The lampreys attack the town en masse, through pipes and any water sources outside. Cate and Nicole go to find Kyle at the beach while Alex goes to his own family. Akerman is also killed by a lamprey that enters his body as he sits on the toilet. Will convinces Michael to help him, and they witness Marcy being attacked and killed by lampreys. They plan to shut down the main water system before the lampreys can escape into Lake Michigan.

They encounter Cate and Nicole, who are busy trying to rescue Kyle from an attic storage area where he's barricaded himself. They succeed once Alex shows up with a ladder, and everyone is able to escape the town. They resolve to use the bio salts from the dead lamprey's livers to lure the live ones to the main water plant where they can electrocute them. They eventually succeed in their plan of electrocuting all the lampreys at the main power plant, but Will is lost to the lampreys. As the town cleans up and Michael and his family leave, having seemingly solved the crisis, a lamprey attacks a member of the cleanup crew.

== Cast ==
- Jason Brooks as Michael Parker
- Shannen Doherty as Cate Parker
- Zack Ward as Will
- Christopher Lloyd as Mayor Bruce Akerman
- Ciara Hanna as Nicole Parker
- Koosha Yar as Kyle Parker
- Fred Stoller as Rich
- Rachel True as Marcy
- Jeremy Wade as Lamprey Expert
- Susie Abromeit as Ellen
- Jody Barton as Jim
- Nicholas Adam Clark as Alex
- Mark Christopher Lawrence as Ted Jargenson
- Mike Jerome Putnam as Officer Samuels
- Ase Justice as Homeless Guy

== Reception ==
Dread Central rated the film a score of 2.5 out of 5, stating that the film "never quite reaches the giddy b-movie heights of similar slithery cult favorites Slugs and Squirm". HorrorNews.net gave the film a positive review, writing, "It’s cheesy, self-referencing, has no pretense at all, and it’s just a stupid good time. If you go into it expecting a horror film, you will hate it. But if you come into it realizing it is farce, you will enjoy every minute of it."

The New York Times reviewed the film along with another film premiering on TV the night before on Chiller, Deep in the Darkness. The film was mostly panned with considerable criticism doled out to the method of death given to Christopher Lloyd's character, with the reviewer calling it "revolting in ways that may haunt you long after this otherwise unmemorable film is over". Andre Manseau from Arrow in the Head awarded the film a rating of 4/10, criticizing the film's wooden acting, poor special effects, and erratic characters, although had different sentiments on Christopher Lloyd's character and death, saying "he's got the best death scene in the movie". The review also compares Blood Lake to other killer lake-creature film series like Lake Placid, Piranha, and even The Asylum's own Sharknado, but claims it never rises to their level of entertainment.
