= Ninjak vs. the Valiant Universe =

American superhero action film

- Genre: Superhero; Action
- Based on: Characters by Valiant Comics
- Screenplay by: Aaron Schoenke; Sean Schoenke; Joe Harris; Andrew Rowe
- Story by: Aaron Schoenke
- Directed by: Aaron Schoenke
- Starring: Michael Rowe; John Hennigan; Chantelle Barry; Ciera Foster; Kevin Porter; Alex Meglei; Damion Poitier; Craig Young; Derek Theler
- Composer: Sean Schoenke
- Country of origin: United States
- Original language: English
- No. of episodes: 6

Production
- Producers: Aaron Schoenke; Sean Schoenke; Dinesh Shamdasani; Josh Johns
- Cinematography: Joey Rassool
- Editor: Aaron Schoenke
- Running time: 72 minutes
- Production companies: Valiant Digital; Bat in the Sun Productions

Original release
- Network: ComicBook.com
- Release: April 21 – April 26, 2018

Ninjak vs. the Valiant Universe is an American superhero action film based on characters appearing in Valiant Comics. The film stars Michael Rowe as the titular Ninjak who must do battle against his former allies, all of whom are superheroes in their own right. Originally produced as a six-episode series in April 2018, it was released as a single film on Valiant Comics' YouTube page on March 26, 2020, as promotion for Bloodshot.

== Premise ==
Colin King / Ninjak is MI6's deadliest intelligence operative and weapons expert. When the ruthless assassin Roku exploits his greatest weakness, Ninjak is forced to betray his closest allies. Now, on the run, he must face off against the most powerful heroes known to man for a high-octane, take-no-prisoners trial by fire more perilous and more unpredictable than any he's faced before.

== Cast ==
=== Main ===
- Michael Rowe as Colin King / Ninjak
- John Hennigan as Gilad Anni-Padda / Eternal Warrior
- Chantelle Barry as Angelina Alcott / Roku
- Ciera Foster as Amanda Mckee / Livewire
- Kevin Porter as Aram Anni-Padda / Armstrong
- Alex Meglei as Obadiah "Obie" Archer / Archer
- Damion Poitier as Jack Boniface / Shadowman
- Craig Young as Neville Alcott
- Jason David Frank as Ray Garrison / Bloodshot
- Derek Theler as Aric of Dacia / X-O Manowar

=== Guest ===
- Tatiana DeKhtyar as Colonel Capshaw
- Katelyn Statton as Susan Alcott
- Carlie Larson as Jillian Alcott
- Nicola Posener as Agent Vivien
- Aaron Schoenke as Nicodemo Darque / Master Darque
- Andre Gordon as Neville Allcott's Assistant

== Production and promotion ==
The project was first announced indirectly by Michael Rowe through his Twitter account in 2016. It was soon announced that a Ninjak series was in the works with Rowe announced to portray the character. Soon after, it was announced that many of the mainstays of the Valiant Universe would be featured including Armstrong of Archer & Armstrong, Timewalker, Faith, Divinity and Savage. Jason David Frank and John Morrison had also been cast as Bloodshot and Eternal Warrior, respectively. Derek Theler soon joined as X-O Manowar as well as Kevin Porter, Chantelle Barry and Nicola Posener. A trailer was released at New York Comic Con along with the announcement of the remaining cast. On April 18, 2018, it was announced that the series would premiere on the website ComicBook.com on April 21, 2018, with the remaining five episodes premiering daily.
