= Suntetsu =

Japanese concealed weapon

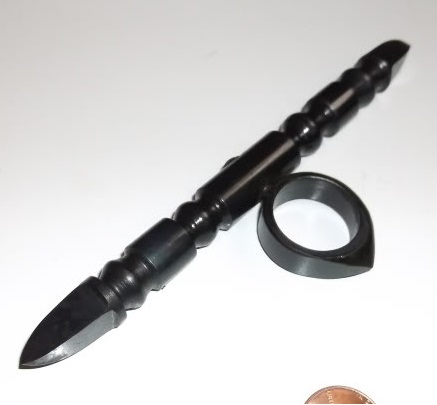
A suntetsu, more of a 'dokko' type

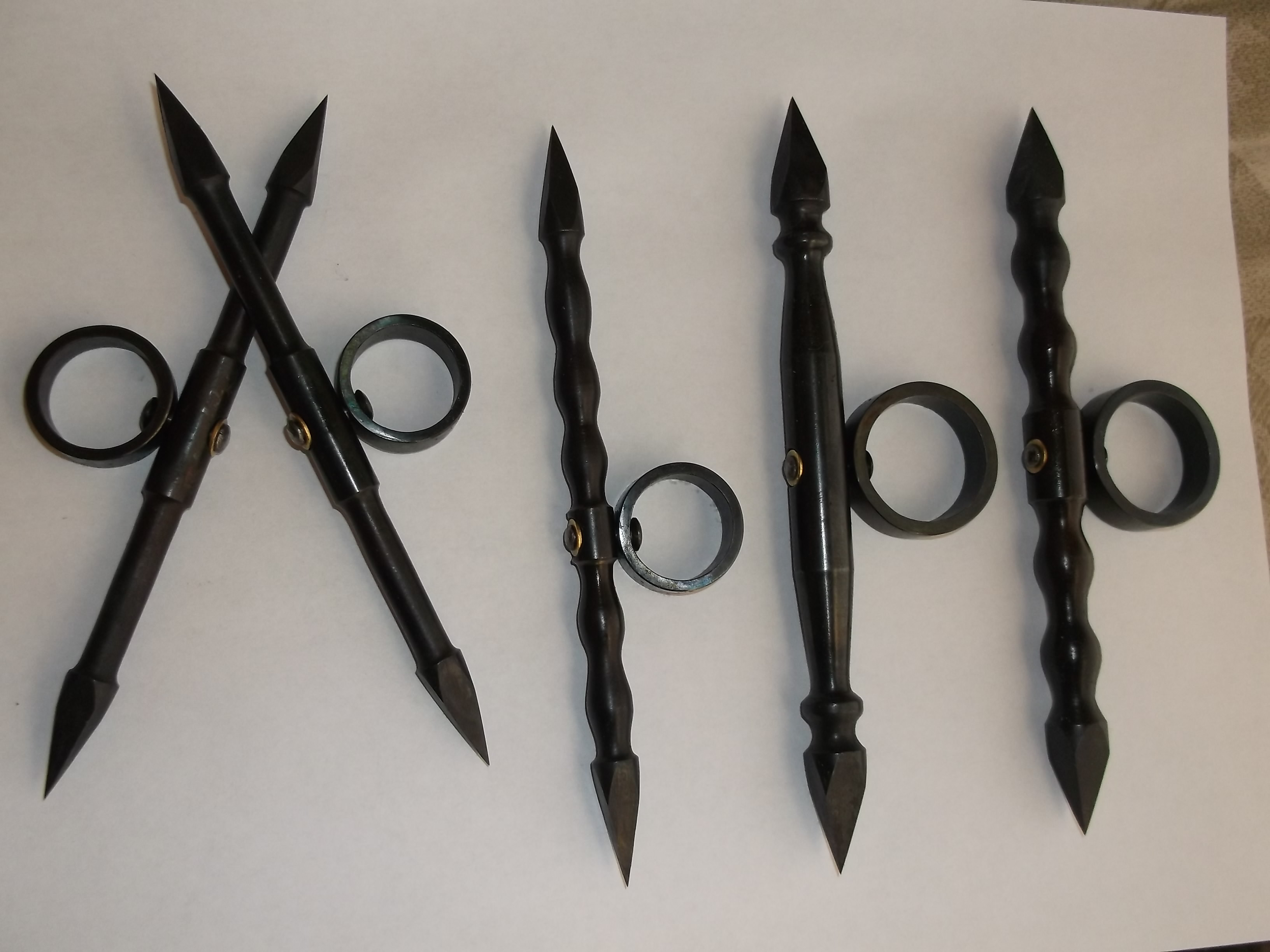
Suntetsu, showing various designs

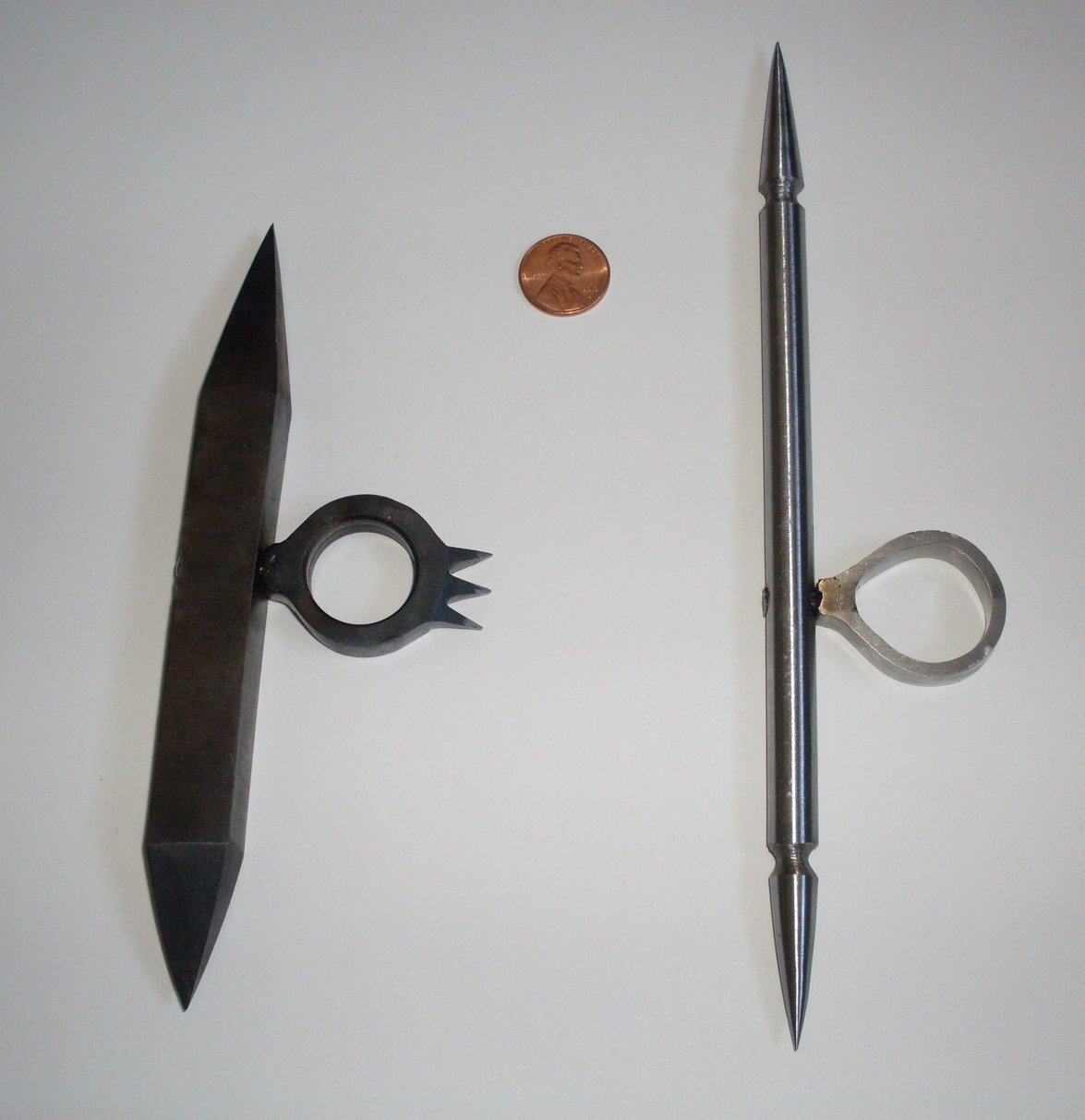
Suntetsu 1

The suntetsu (寸鉄) is a Japanese concealed weapon. A suntetsu is a metal rod/spike about 15 cm (5.9 in) in length with a ring attached to it. The middle finger is inserted into the ring and the suntetsu rests in the hand by various grips. Suntetsu are small, easy to conceal and relatively simple to learn how to use. Suntetsu are used for stabbing, poking, pinching, striking, smashing, scraping and throwing. Suntetsu can be used alone or as a pair.

== See also ==
- Emeici – a similar Chinese weapon
- Shobo – a similar Japanese weapon
- List of martial arts weapons
