= Shobo =

- Type: Dagger
- Place of origin: Japan

Service history
- Used by: Ninja

Specifications

A shobo is a weapon, similar to the Emeici of China, which was used by the ninja of Japan for striking pressure points on an opponent.

== Form ==
The shobo was a piece of wood that was gripped by the wielder and was hung by a ring worn on the middle finger. Some versions were rings with a wooden peg attached on top. The ends were exposed and were usually sharp, which made them effective for paralyzing and even killing enemies quickly and without leaving a trace. They were easily hidden in the fists and were very lightweight and portable. They were usually worn in pairs. Many ninjas constructed their own shobo, although some were given from master to student.

== History ==
Due to the secretive nature of the ninja, there is no way of knowing exactly when and where the shobo was invented (meaning no more precise than feudal Japan) and exactly how popular it was among the ninja. It is believed this was an improvised weapon, with common origins cited as bridle bits for horses and livestock, harness rings for reins, and metal hinges for gates and doors. How the weapon was formalized is still up for debate.

== See also ==
- Emeici – a similar Chinese weapon
- Suntetsu – a similar Japanese weapon
- List of martial arts weapons
