= Brandon Barash =

American actor (born 1979)

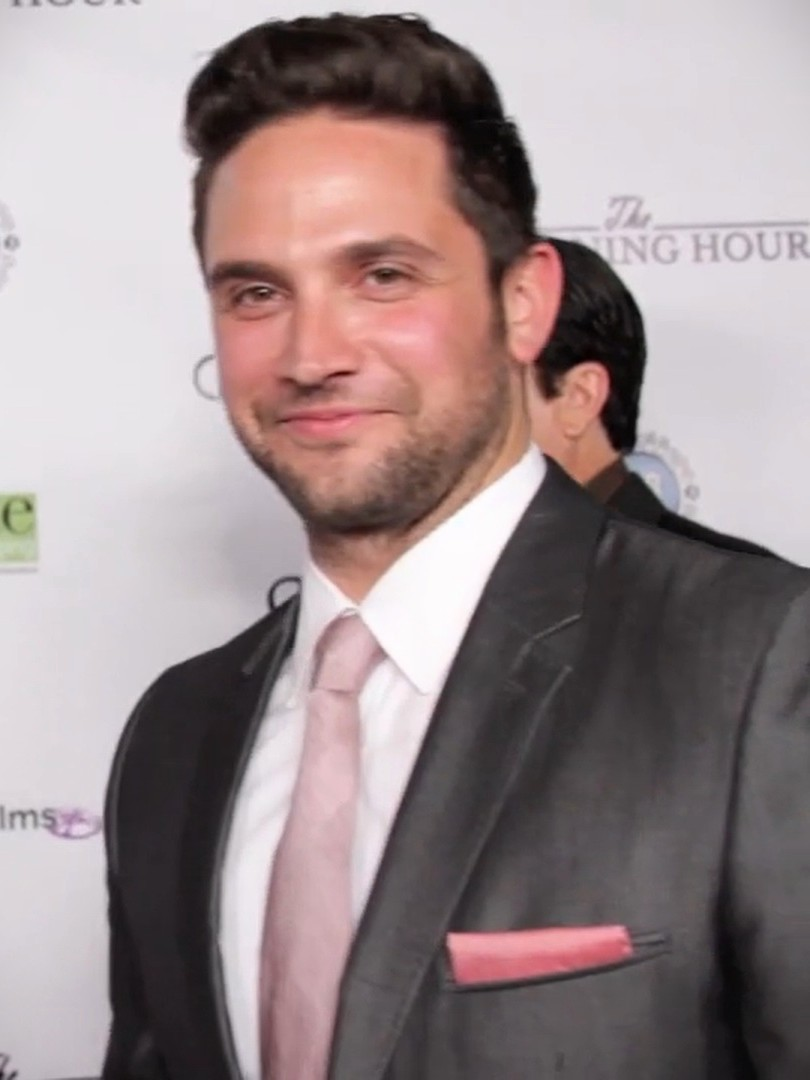
- Barash in 2013
- Born: Brandon Joseph Barash; October 4, 1979 (age 46); St. Louis, Missouri, U.S.
- Occupation: Actor
- Years active: 2002–present
- Spouses: Kirsten Storms (m. 2013; div. 2016) Isabella Devoto (m. 2022)
- Children: 2

Brandon Joseph Barash (born October 4, 1979) is an American actor. He is known for playing the roles of Johnny Zacchara on the ABC Daytime soap opera General Hospital (2007 to 2013, 2014 to 2015) and Stefan DiMera on the NBC Daytime soap opera Days of Our Lives (2019, 2020, 2022 to 2024). He also played Jake DiMera on Days of Our Lives (2020 to 2022).

== Early life ==
Barash was born in St. Louis, Missouri. When he was four years old, his parents divorced and he moved to Calabasas, California with his father. His father was the president and CEO of Sysco Food Services of Ventura. He has one brother and a younger half-sister.

His family is Jewish and he attended Hebrew school until his bar mitzvah. A year later, his father's job transferred him and they moved to Houston, Texas. Barash encountered antisemitism. He has said that he kept quiet because he was afraid of getting beaten up.

In high school, he played basketball until a knee injury forced him to quit. His girlfriend was performing in a school production of the musical Big River and she signed him up for an audition. Barash reluctantly tried out and got the part. He decided that he loved being on stage. He went on to play Daddy Warbucks in a school production of Annie. He shaved his head for the part. Barash graduated from Memorial High School in Texas. After graduation, he enrolled at the University of Southern California, majoring in theater and pre-med. By his sophomore year, he had decided to pursue an acting career. He graduated in 2002 with a Bachelor of Fine Arts degree in acting.

== Career ==
Two months after graduating from college, Barash landed the recurring role of Jamie, Paris Geller's boyfriend, on The WB drama series Gilmore Girls. He appeared in three episodes from 2002 to 2004. In 2003, he guest starred on Threat Matrix and The West Wing. Barash played Roger in the action film Crash Landing (2005), co-starring with Antonio Sabàto Jr. He also guest starred on 24.

In 2006, he appeared in the thriller film Intellectual Property (also titled Dark Mind) and guest starred on NCIS. In 2007, he appeared in the film Ten Inch Hero and guest starred on Tell Me You Love Me.

Barash was cast in the contract role of Johnny Zacchara on the ABC soap opera General Hospital. His first airdate was September 18, 2007. In March 2013, he announced on Twitter that he was leaving General Hospital. Barash confirmed that it was his decision to leave. He had last aired on the show on February 15, 2013, but he returned briefly from April 26 until May 3, 2013.

In 2013, Barash guest starred on Bones. In 2014, he guest starred on Kingdom (originally titled Navy St.). He played Carl in The Mourning Hour, a short film set in the 1950s. Barash played the recurring role of Detective Robby Oderno on the TNT police procedural Major Crimes, appearing in six episodes from 2014 to 2016. Barash returned to General Hospital as Johnny, airing from December 5, 2014 until February 10, 2015.

He guest starred on CSI: Cyber. Barash played actor Thomas Calabro in the Lifetime television film The Unauthorized Melrose Place Story (2015). He returned to General Hospital, first airing in early December 2015. Barash left the show when Johnny was taken back to prison.

In 2017, Barash played Ernest Hemingway in the episode "The Lost Generation" of the NBC time travel TV series Timeless. He also guest starred on Criminal Minds: Beyond Borders. He starred in the television film Cradle Swapping (originally titled Stolen From the Cradle). Barash guest starred on Scorpion. In 2018, he guest starred on Lucifer and The Last Ship.

In September 2018, it was announced that Barash had joined the cast of the NBC soap opera Days of Our Lives. He replaced Tyler Christopher in the role of Stefan DiMera. Barash first aired in early 2019. He played the role of Stefan until October 2019, when the character was killed off. On April 23, 2020, he began airing as Jake Lambert (later known as Jake DiMera) on Days of Our Lives. The character was revealed to be Stefan's previously unknown twin brother. Jake was shot and killed in July 2022. Soon after, Stefan DiMera was brought back from the dead.

Barash has played in the rock group Port Chuck, along with his former General Hospital co-stars Steve Burton, Scott Reeves, and Bradford Anderson. He is also a member of The Day Players Band, with his Days of Our Lives co-stars Wally Kurth, Carson Boatman, and Eric Martsolf. From 2019 to 2022, he had a recurring role on Good Trouble.

In October 2024, Barash announced that he had been dismissed from his role as Stefan DiMera on Days of Our Lives. His final air date was October 28, 2024.

== Personal life ==
When he was eighteen, his best friend died from Duchenne muscular dystrophy. Barash vowed that if he became successful, he would fight for a cure for the disease. In 2010, he was named a National Celebrity Ambassador for MD, after raising funds and helping with the annual telethon.

In December 2011, Barash became engaged to actress Natalie Hall, after dating her for over a year. They later broke up.

In August 2013, Barash and his former General Hospital co-star Kirsten Storms told People that they had secretly wed in June, and were expecting their first child, a girl, in January 2014. In January 2014, Barash confirmed on Twitter that Storms had given birth to a baby girl. In April 2016, the couple announced that they had filed for divorce.

In December 2020, he announced that he was dating Isabella Devoto, a teacher he had met at his daughter's school. They became engaged in December 2021. Barash and Devoto were married December 17, 2022 at North Ranch Country Club in Thousand Oaks, California. Their first child, a son, was born in September 2023.

== Filmography ==
=== Film ===
Year	Title	Role	Notes
2005	Crash Landing	Roger	
2006	Intellectual Property	Jenny's Boyfriend	Also titled Dark Mind
2007	Ten Inch Hero	Stud	
2014	The Mourning Hour	Carl Bakely	Short film Also associate producer
2014	Guardian Angel	Rudy	
2017	Sedation	Norman Fields	Short film
2018	NRA Auditions	Producer (voice)	Video

=== Television ===
Year	Title	Role	Notes
2002–2004	Gilmore Girls	Jamie	3 episodes
2003	Threat Matrix	Marine #1	Episode: "Doctor Germ"
2003	The West Wing	Bret	Episode: "The Shutdown"
2005	24	CTU Tech Brandon	Episodes: "Day 4: 3:00 p.m.-4:00 p.m.", "Day 4: 5:00 p.m.-6:00 p.m."
2006	NCIS	Derrick Paulson	Episode: "Escaped"
2007	Tell Me You Love Me	Frank	Episode 1.3
2007–2016	General Hospital	Johnny Zacchara	Series regular
2010	The Jerry Lewis MDA Labor Day Telethon	Himself	Co-Host
2013	Bones	Storm	Episode: "The Party in the Pants"
2014–2016	Major Crimes	Detective Robby Oderno	Recurring role, 6 episodes
2014	Kingdom	Pushy Barfly	Episode: "Piece of Plastic"
2015	CSI: Cyber	Stephen Christos	Episode: "Bit by Bit"
2015	The Unauthorized Melrose Place Story	Thomas Calabro	Television film
2017	Timeless	Ernest Hemingway	Episode: "The Lost Generation"
2017	Criminal Minds: Beyond Borders	Scott Davis	Episode: "Cinderella and the Dragon"
2017	Cradle Swapping	Ray	Television film
2017	Scorpion	King Phillip/Chad	Episode: "Faire is Foul"
2018	The Last Ship	Pablo	Episode: "Fog of War"
2018	Lucifer	Jeremy Bell	Episode: "The Angel of San Bernardino"
2019–2020, 2022–2024	Days of Our Lives	Stefan DiMera	Series Regular (March 22 to October 24, 2019; August 2, 2022 to October 28, 2024); Guest appearance (May 4, 2020)
2020–2022	Days of Our Lives	Jake DiMera	Recurring role (April 23 to October 13, 2020); Series regular (October 20, 2020 to August 2, 2022)
2019–2022	Good Trouble	Nathan	3 episodes

=== Web series ===
Year	Title	Role	Notes
2014	A Girl in a Bra, a Guy in Boxers	Guy	5 episodes
