= Jason David Frank =

American actor (1973–2022)

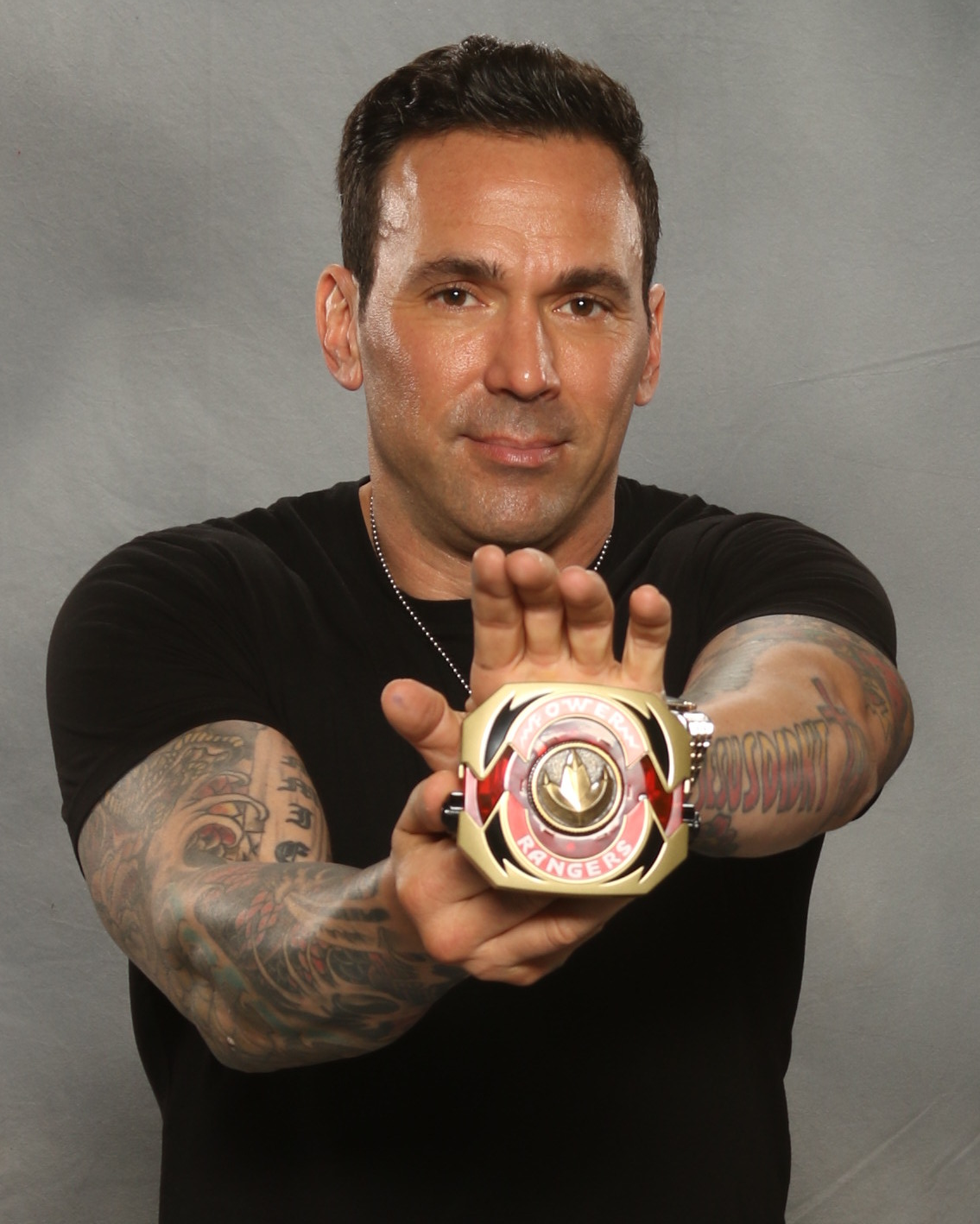
- Frank in 2017
- Born: September 4, 1973; Covina, California, U.S.
- Died: November 19, 2022 (aged 49); Houston, Texas, U.S.
- Nickname: Fearless
- Height: 5 ft 11 in (180 cm)
- Weight: 214 lb (97 kg; 15 st 4 lb)
- Division: Heavyweight
- Style: Toso Kune Do
- Stance: Orthodox
- Fighting out of: Houston, Texas, U.S.
- Team: Silverback MMA
- Rank: 8th Dan Black Belt in Shotokan Karate; Black Belt in Wado-ryu Karate; Black Belt in Taekwondo; Black Belt in Judo; Purple Belt in Brazilian Jiu-Jitsu; Ajarn Degree in Muay Thai
- Years active: 2010 (MMA)

Mixed martial arts record
- Total: 1
- Wins: 1
- By submission: 1
- Losses: 0

Amateur MMA record
- Total: 4
- Wins: 4
- By knockout: 2
- By submission: 2
- Losses: 0

Other information
- Children: 4
- Mixed martial arts record from Sherdog
- Last updated on: April 28, 2010

Jason David Frank (September 4, 1973 – November 19, 2022) was an American actor and mixed martial artist, best known for his role as Tommy Oliver in the Power Rangers television franchise.

== Early life ==
Frank was born in Covina, California on September 4, 1973. Frank had an older brother named Erik Frank, who appeared in Power Rangers Zeo as Tommy Oliver's long-lost brother David Trueheart.

In 1992, Frank was a contestant on The Price Is Right.

== Career ==
=== Modeling life as a child ===
Frank was a child model for the company called Olive Productions during the 1980s.

=== Power Rangers ===
Frank was cast in the role of Tommy Oliver, the Green Ranger in Mighty Morphin Power Rangers. The role was set for 14 episodes, but due to the character's popularity, he was brought back as the White Ranger and the team's new leader.

Frank was a huge fan of professional wrestling and Vince McMahon wanted him and the other Power Rangers cast members to appear on WWF programming to promote Mighty Morphin Power Rangers: The Movie for a few months. McMahon wanted Frank to referee the casket match between The Undertaker and Yokozuna at Survivor Series but Haim Saban refused to allow the Power Rangers franchise on WWF television and Frank was replaced by Chuck Norris for the casket match.

Frank was supposed to be the lead character Adam Steele in VR Troopers (originally called Cybertron) and shot a pilot episode before being called back to Power Rangers. According to Frank and Brad Hawkins, Hawkins' character was originally going to replace Tommy Oliver as the White Ranger in Power Rangers. However, due to Tommy Oliver's popularity with Power Rangers fans, Frank was brought back, with Tommy Oliver becoming the White Ranger. Hawkins would then take over the role of Ryan Steele on VR Troopers, who was originally named Adam Steele. After three seasons, Mighty Morphin Power Rangers transitioned into Power Rangers Zeo to match the annual change of the Super Sentai series. Frank's character became the Red Zeo Ranger, also called Zeo Ranger V.

The following year in Power Rangers Turbo, his character became the first Red Turbo Ranger. During mid-season, Frank and his fellow cast members Johnny Yong Bosch, Nakia Burrise and Catherine Sutherland agreed to leave and were replaced.

After leaving the series in 1997, in 2002 Frank returned to Power Rangers as the Red Zeo Ranger for the special 10th-anniversary episode, entitled "Forever Red", of Power Rangers Wild Force. This episode brought back ten former Red Rangers and reunited him with Austin St. John.

He then reprised his role in 2004 in Power Rangers Dino Thunder as the Black Dino Ranger, which he stated was a favor to Douglas Sloan. While portraying this role, Frank wore long-sleeved shirts to cover the tattoos on his arms, which was also the case in "Forever Red". He joked that Saban and Disney are "both the same, they're cheap", but that he was impressed with the production crew for Dino Thunder.

Frank reprised his role as Tommy Oliver and the Green Ranger in the season finale of Power Rangers Super Megaforce. Frank expressed interest in developing a Green Ranger solo series or feature film after an encounter with Stan Lee at a comic book convention.

Frank had a cameo role in the 2017 film Power Rangers, as a citizen of Angel Grove, alongside fellow Power Rangers actress Amy Jo Johnson. In 2018, he reprised his role as Tommy in episode 10 of Power Rangers Super Ninja Steel for the 25th anniversary of Power Rangers. In August 2022, Frank revealed that he had retired from the franchise.

=== Bat in the Sun: Super Power Beatdown ===
On November 7, 2013, Frank appeared on Super Power Beatdown as the White Ranger taking on Scorpion from Mortal Kombat. He appeared again on May 5, 2015, as the Green Ranger, and fought Ryu from Street Fighter. After success with the Super Power Beatdown series, Bat in the Sun began developing a web reality series of Frank, titled My Morphing Life. In 2015, the show began airing a second season.

=== Ninjak vs. the Valiant Universe ===
In 2016, Frank was cast in the web series Ninjak vs. the Valiant Universe, based on the Valiant Universe, as Bloodshot. The series was released in 2018 to positive reception from fans. Frank was considered as superior to Vin Diesel's incarnation of the character in 2020. Valiant paid tribute to Frank on their Twitter after his death.

=== New Era – Legend of the White Dragon ===
The film Legend of the White Dragon launched on Kickstarter in 2020. Initially, it was going to be a mini-series or fan film, but its popularity caused it to develop into a full-feature film. The film includes past Power Rangers performers, such as Frank, Jason Faunt, and Ciara Hanna. Other cast members include Mark Dacascos, Michael Madsen, Andrew Byron Bachelor, and Jenna Frank. The movie wrapped in 2021. It was set to release in March 2023, but after Frank's death in 2022, the film was rescheduled to be released in September 2024. On March 28, 2026, Well Go USA Entertainment acquired the film's distribution rights with a planned release date on August 28 of that year to coincide with National Power Rangers Day.

=== Fighting and martial arts ===
Toso Kune Do
- Focus: Hybrid
- Hardness: Full-contact
- Country of origin: United States
- Creator: Jason David Frank
- Parenthood: Karate (Shōtōkan, Wado-ryu), Judo, Wing Chun, Jeet Kune Do, Taekwondo, Muay Thai, Aikido, Brazilian Jiu-Jitsu
- Olympic sport: No

Frank had knowledge of many different styles of martial arts, including Shōtōkan, Wadō-ryū, Taekwondo, Judo, Brazilian Jiu-Jitsu, Muay Thai, Jeet Kune Do, and Aikido. He modified the most practical applications with his own philosophies to create his own blend of American Karate in 1994, "Toso Kune Do" (斗争拳道, lit. 'Way of the Fist-Fighter' or 'Way of the Fighting Fist'). On June 28, 2003, he was inducted into the World Karate Union Hall of Fame. Frank appeared at the Arnold Classic on February 29, 2008, in Columbus, Ohio. "Toso Kune Do" is still taught at his "Rising Sun Karate" dojo in Houston, TX, and the curriculum is taught by his highest ranking Black Belt Sam Sprague.

Frank was temporarily a Guinness World Record holder in January 2013, as he successfully broke the existing record for the most 1-inch pine boards broken during freefall. The previous record was only two boards broken, but Frank attempted to break eight and successfully broke seven in his record-breaking attempt. His record was eclipsed only a few months later in May 2013 by current Guinness World Record holder Daniel McKay, who broke twelve boards during his attempt.

=== Mixed martial arts ===
On August 21, 2009, Frank officially announced his signing with SuckerPunch Entertainment, a sports marketing and management company specializing in MMA. He began training with UFC lightweight Melvin Guillard.

Frank made his MMA debut for the United States Amateur Combat Association at the company's first event, "Lonestar Beatdown: Houston" on January 30, 2010, at the Houston Arena Theatre. He defeated Jonathon "the Mack Truck" Mack in the first round by omoplata submission. Frank fought in his second fight at Lonestar Beatdown: Dallas on February 19 in Arlington, Texas. His opponent was Chris Rose, who made his ring entrance wearing a Teenage Mutant Ninja Turtles robe. Frank defeated Rose in round 1 with a TKO.

On May 8, 2010, he fought for the Texas Rage in the Cage Amateur Association "Cage Rage 7" in State Farm Arena in Hidalgo, Texas. His opponent was James Willis, whom he defeated via KO with a rising knee within 23 seconds of the first round starting.

Frank was scheduled to make his debut with Ultimate Warrior Challenge at their upcoming event on May 22 against James "Ray" Handy Jr. in a light heavyweight bout.

On May 21, Frank announced on his official Facebook fan page that James Handy was injured, and Carlos Horn would replace him, changing the fight to a heavyweight bout. Frank defeated Horn in the first round by an armbar submission. Since turning pro, Frank expressed interest in signing a deal with Strikeforce and potentially fighting Herschel Walker.

Frank announced on his Facebook fan page that he was scheduled to make his professional debut on August 4, 2010, in Houston at "Puro Combate #1." He fought at heavyweight, with his opponent being Jose Roberto Vasquez. Frank won his pro MMA debut with a time of 0:46 in the first round by a Rear Naked Choke Submission.

Frank was scheduled for a light heavyweight bout on December 9, 2010, at Puro Combate 3. The fight was canceled on December 8, due to his opponent not being medically cleared. He was then scheduled to face Shawn Machado on July 22, 2011, at Legacy FC 7, but due to a possible biceps tear, the fight was cancelled.

=== Power Rangers 30th Anniversary reunion ===
On January 17, 2023, the first footage of Mighty Morphin Power Rangers: Once & Always was released on YouTube, showing the original Green Ranger. This prompted speculation that Frank was reprising the role again, and that his denials on social media were part of a disinformation campaign. On March 6, the YouTube channel MrWeenieProductions posted audio recorded from a livestream from the Bat in the Sun channel, run by a friend of Frank's. This friend had stated that Frank declined to participate in the reunion due to an alleged history of lies, broken promises, and uncredited idea theft by Hasbro and Saban.

=== Final works ===
Frank's film, Legend of the White Dragon, was posthumously released on August 28, 2026, which also happened to be National Power Rangers Day. The project which was crowdfunded using Kickstarter, Frank helped write, produce, and act as the lead in the film. His daughter, Jenna Frank, promoted the film on her Instagram account, stating this was one of her dad's biggest dreams.

== Personal life ==
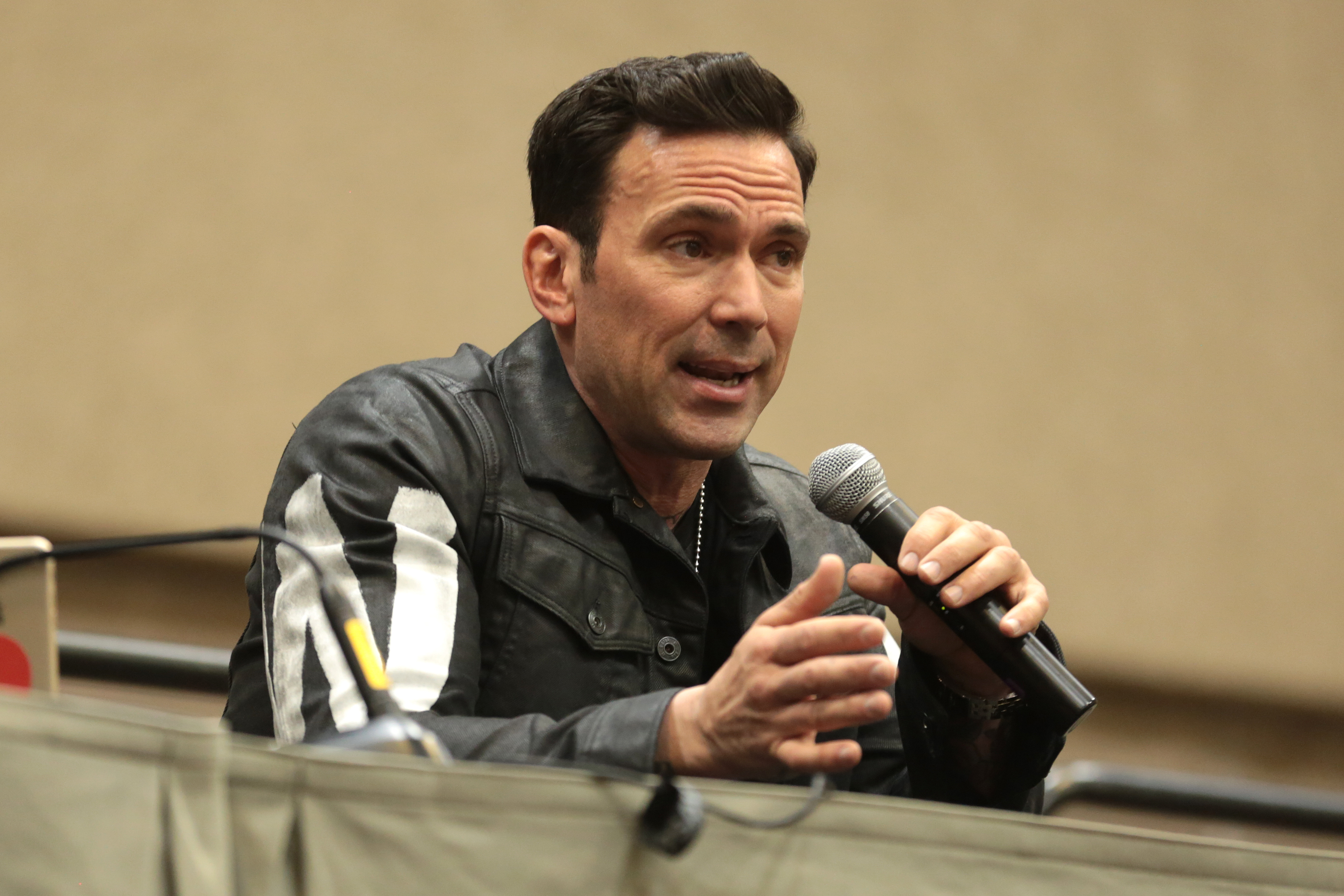
Frank at the 2017 Phoenix Comicon

Frank began attending a Christian church after the death of his brother Erik. He married his first wife, Shawna, in 1994, and they had three children together before divorcing in 2001. In 2003, he married his second wife, Tammie, and they had one daughter. In 2022, Tammie filed for divorce, though she and Frank were attempting to reconcile at the time of his death.

In 2017, he was targeted by a man named Matthew Sterling while attending Phoenix Comicon. Police were able to arrest Sterling before he got near Frank, after being tipped off due to social media threats made by Sterling. Sterling was later committed to 25 1/2 years at the Arizona State Hospital.

== Death ==
On November 19, 2022, Jason David Frank was found dead by suicide in a hotel in Katy, Texas. He was 49 years old. His wife Tammie, who was also staying at the hotel, subsequently explained that Frank had been struggling with depression and other mental health issues. The couple, who were in the middle of a divorce, argued loudly and got separate rooms. Tammie stepped out of Frank's room to go to the lobby for snacks to "help him relax and sober up before sleep." She was gone for approximately 10 minutes. Upon returning, she found the door locked and received no response to her repeated knocking. Hotel staff and law enforcement were called to the scene. Police gained entry to the room and discovered the actor had hanged himself in the bathroom. Several of Frank's former co-stars—including Amy Jo Johnson, Austin St. John, David Yost, Walter Emanuel Jones, Steve Cardenas, Johnny Yong Bosch, and Catherine Sutherland—posted tributes to Frank.

== Filmography ==
=== Television ===
Title	Year	Role	Notes
Mighty Morphin Power Rangers	1993–1996	Tommy Oliver – Green Ranger / White Ranger	Credited as Jason Frank in season 1; 124 episodes
Mighty Morphin Power Rangers: Alpha's Magical Christmas	1994	Tommy Oliver	Video short
VR Troopers	1994	Adam Steele – Cybertron	1 episode (Pilot)
Power Rangers Zeo	1996	Tommy Oliver – Zeo Ranger V Red	50 episodes
Sweet Valley High	1996	A.J.	4 episodes
Family Matters	1996	Skull	Episode: "Karate Kids"
Power Rangers Turbo	1997	Tommy Oliver / Red Turbo Ranger	19 episodes
Power Rangers: The Lost Episode	1999	Tommy Oliver	Archival footage
Undressed	2000	Carl	3 episodes
Power Rangers Wild Force	2002	Tommy Oliver / Zeo Ranger V Red	Credited as Jason Frank; Episode: "Forever Red"
Power Rangers Dino Thunder	2004	Dr. Tommy Oliver / Black Dino Ranger	38 episodes (12 voice only)
Mighty Morphin Power Rangers (Reversioned)	2010	Tommy Oliver/ Green Ranger	16 episodes
Power Rangers Super Megaforce	2014	Dr. Tommy Oliver / Green Ranger / White Ranger	Episode: "Legendary Battle"
My Morphing Life	2014–2022	Himself	Web series
Transformers: Titans Return	2017–2018	Emissary (voice)	Web series
Ninjak vs. the Valiant Universe	2018	Ray Garrison / Bloodshot	Web series
Power Rangers Hyperforce	2018	Dr. Tommy Oliver / Black Dino Ranger Lord Drakkon	Web series; Episodes: "Dr. Tommy Oliver Returns" "Shattered Grid, part 2"
Power Rangers Super Ninja Steel	2018	Dr. Tommy Oliver / Green Ranger / White Ranger / Zeo Ranger V Red / Black Dino Ranger / Robot Tommy	Episode: "Dimensions in Danger"
We Bare Bears	2019	Silver Bear (voice)	Episode: "Imaginary Friend"

=== Film ===
Film	Year	Portraying	Notes
Mighty Morphin Power Rangers: The Movie	1995	Tommy Oliver / White Ranger	Lead role
Turbo: A Power Rangers Movie	1997	Tommy Oliver / Red Turbo Ranger	
Paris	2003	Chad (uncredited)	
The Junior Defenders	2007	Tommy Keen	
Fall Guy: The John Stewart Story	2007	John Stewart	
The Blue Sun	2010		
Crammed 2: Hoaching	2011	Christopher Crammed	
One Warrior	2011		
Power Rangers	2017	Angel Grove Citizen	Cameo
Power Rangers: Legacy Wars – Street Fighter Showdown	2018	Tommy Oliver	
Making Fun: The Story of Funko	2018	Himself	Documentary
Mighty Morphin Power Rangers: Once & Always	2023	Tommy Oliver / Green Ranger	Posthumous role; archival audio & footage 30th anniversary special
Legend of the White Dragon	2026	Erik Reed / White Dragon	Final roles (posthumous release)
Underdogs Rising	TBA	Jaxon	Final roles (posthumous release)

=== Video games ===
Video Game	Year	Portraying	Notes
Mighty Morphin Power Rangers: The Movie	1995	Tommy / White Ranger	Voice
Piper	1995	Piper Windsong	Video capture
Power Rangers Dino Thunder	2004	Dr. Tommy Oliver / Black Dino Ranger	Voice
Power Rangers: Battle for the Grid	2019	Tommy Oliver / Lord Drakkon / Green Ranger / White Ranger	Voice
Power Rangers: Legacy Wars	2021; 2022; 2023	Tommy Oliver / Green Ranger / White Ranger / White Ninja Ranger / Zeo Ranger V Red / Red Turbo Ranger / Black Dino Ranger	Voice; archive audio/posthumous

== Mixed martial arts record ==
=== Professional ===
Professional record breakdown
1 match	1 win	0 losses
By knockout	0	0
By submission	1	0
By decision	0	0

Res.	Record	Opponent	Method	Event	Date	Round	Time	Location	Notes
Win	1–0	Jose Roberto Vasquez	Submission (Straight-Arm Bar)	Texas Cage Fighting – Puro Combate 1	August 4, 2010	1	0:46	Houston, Texas, United States	

=== Amateur ===
Res.	Record	Opponent	Method	Event	Date	Round	Time	Location	Notes
Win	1–0	Jonathon Mack	Submission (omoplata)	Lonestar Beatdown: Houston	January 30, 2010	1	1:07	Houston, Texas, United States	
Win	2–0	Chris Rose	TKO (punches)	Lonestar Beatdown: Dallas	February 19, 2010	1	2:09	Arlington, Texas, United States	
Win	3–0	James Willis	KO (knee)	Texas Rage In The Cage: Cage Rage 7	May 8, 2010	1	0:23	McAllen, Texas, United States	
Win	4–0	Carlos Horn	Submission (armbar)	UWC 8: Judgement Day	May 22, 2010	1	0:21	Fairfax, Virginia, United States	
