= Emeici =

Chinese martial arts weapon

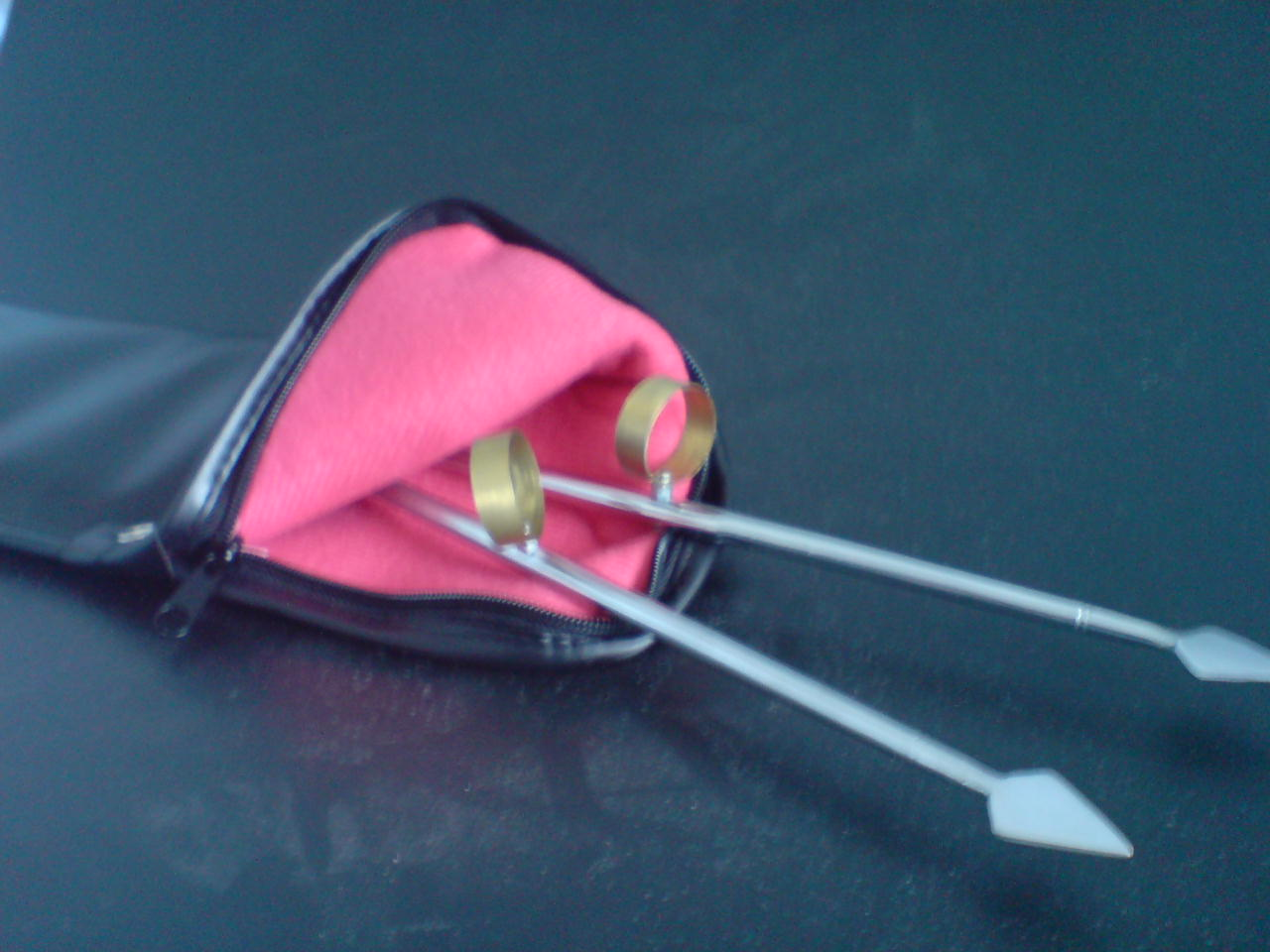
A pair of Emei piercers or emeici in a soft case for carrying.

Emeici (峨嵋刺; variously translated as "Emei daggers" or "Emei piercers") are a traditional Chinese martial arts weapon. They are a pair of metal rods with sharp ends used for stabbing; they are typically mounted on a detachable ring worn on the middle finger, allowing them to spin and be elaborately manipulated.

These weapons originated at Mount Emei (hence the name). They are a piece of equipment used in wushu to this day.

These weapons are used for 'open palm' techniques, and are similar to 'judge's pens'.

The general idea of this weapon is to confuse the attacker by spinning the blades, thereby providing a distraction while trying to get close enough to stab. Also, emeici can be concealed easily for surprise attacks.

== See also ==
- Shobo – a similar Japanese weapon
- Suntetsu – a similar Japanese weapon
- List of martial arts weapons
