= Legend of the White Dragon =

2026 film by Aaron and Sean Schoenke

- Theatrical release poster
- Directed by: Aaron Schoenke; Sean Schoenke
- Written by: Alex Kellerman; Aaron Schoenke
- Created by: Jason David Frank; Aaron Schoenke
- Produced by: Chris Jay; Aaron Schoenke; Sean Schoenke; Jason David Frank; Ben Dukes
- Starring: Jason David Frank; Aaron Schoenke; Jason Faunt; Rachele Brooke Smith; Michael Madsen; Andrew Bachelor; David Ramsey; Mark Dacascos
- Cinematography: Aric Abraham
- Edited by: Aaron Schoenke
- Music by: Sean Schoenke
- Production company: Bat in the Sun Productions
- Distributed by: Well Go USA Entertainment
- Release date: August 28, 2026
- Running time: 98 minutes
- Country: United States
- Language: English
- Box office: $643,643

Legend of the White Dragon is a 2026 American independent superhero film directed by Sean and Aaron Schoenke. The film reunites Power Rangers actors Jason David Frank, Jason Faunt, Cerina Vincent and Ciara Hanna. It also stars Aaron Schoenke, David Ramsey, Rachele Brooke Smith, Andrew Bachelor, Michael Madsen, and Mark Dacascos. The story, set three years after a tragic battle, sees Erik Reed / the White Dragon (Frank) return to his city to protect his wife and daughter from a new threat. The film is described as a "mature take on the Power Rangers franchise", but is set in its own original universe.

The project was crowdfunded through Kickstarter, after a single unsuccessful campaign on the same site. Filming occurred in 2021, with additional photography occurring in 2023. Legend of the White Dragon is among the final film roles for both Frank and Madsen, who died respectively in 2022 and 2025; the film was dedicated to their memories.

After multiple delays, the film was released in the United States on August 28, 2026, by Well Go USA Entertainment. The film received negative reviews from critics, with Frank's performance receiving praise and was a box-office failure, grossing only $643,643.

== Synopsis ==
After three years of forced hiding as a fugitive, Erik Reed—a former superhero known as the White Dragon—returns to the city he swore to protect. His goal: to clear his name and reunite with the family he keeps secret. Only one thing stands in his way: the mysterious Dragon Prime, who will stop at nothing to enact his revenge on the White Dragon.

== Cast ==
- Jason David Frank as Erik Reed / the White Dragon: A former superhero, harnessing the power of the White Dragon crystal to gain superhuman powers and armor.
- Aaron Schoenke as Jai Katua / Dragon Prime: A man seeking revenge against Erik Reed, harnessing half of the White Dragon crystal to gain its power.
- Jason Faunt as Connor Frost: Erik Reed's closest friend and one of his main allies.
- Rachele Brooke Smith as Iris Maine: One of Erik Reed's main allies and friends.
- Michael Madsen as Max Reed: Erik's estranged father and a renowned jewel thief.
- Andrew Bachelor as URI: An outer-dimensional mentor to Erik and his allies.
- David Ramsey as Mayor Trevon Sterns / Ashtagor: The Mayor of Virtuo City, determined to bring Erik Reed to justice for his alleged crimes.
- Mark Dacascos as Xang: A warrior monk, tasked with protecting the White Dragon crystal.
- Cerina Vincent as Rebecca Reed: Erik Reed's wife and mother of his daughter, Ashley.
- Jenna Rae Frank as Ashley Reed: Rebecca and Erik's teenaged daughter.
- Kevin Porter as Brian "Lighthouse" Clayton: A grizzled detective, partnered with Tek Boh to hunt Erik Reed.
- Chalet Lizette Brannan as Jade: A fellow monk alongside Xang.

Additionally, Ciara Hanna played Vanessa Katua (Jai's late wife), Lenore Zann played Marie Summers, Orion Acaba played Alvardo, DeMark Thompson played APOC Lieutenant, Andrew Hwang played Lee Han, Ron Rogge' played Commander Lewis, Amy Johnston played Detective Beaumont, Danny Parker-Lopes played Office Baca, Carlos Baca played Officer Lopez, Jada Kim played Betsy Locke, Nicole Fong played April, Shyaam Karra played Yoshi, Katelyn Statton played Kathryn Carter, Amanda Lynne Shafer played Madelyn, Ben Dukes played Office Branson Smith, and Lex Cappiello played Lisa Ann. John Jeffrey Arias played an APOC Hideout Guard and Tony Diaz played a waiter.

== Production ==
In 2013, Aaron Schoenke met Power Ranger franchise star Jason David Frank when they collaborated on the former's YouTube webseries Super Power Beat Down. Over the next few years, Frank and Schoenke started early discussions for a new project, which would become Legend of the White Dragon.

On July 18, 2019, a Kickstarter campaign was launched, hoping to find production for the film. With a goal of $500,000, Power Rangers actors Johnny Yong Bosch, Jason Faunt, Ciara Hanna, Yoshi Sudarso, and Chrysti Ane had signed on, along with Jason's daughter, Jenna Rae Frank. The campaign ended on August 18, 2019, unsuccessful in reaching its goal.

A second campaign began on March 20, 2020, and lasted for 60 days, this time with a budget for a $100,000 mini-series, but offered a new stretch goal of $500,000 for a feature film. The initial goal was met in 11 days, and the campaign ended on May 27, 2020, with $508,578 raised, meeting the goal for a feature film. During the Kickstarter campaign, Catherine Sutherland was announced to be in the film. Due to scheduling conflicts, Bosch left the project, while Sudarso and Ane left the project for unknown reasons.

Near the end of the campaign, the main cast was announced with Faunt, Hanna, and Rae Frank remaining from the original cast, joined by Rachele Brooke Smith and Andrew Bachelor. Throughout production, several more cast members were announced, including Mark Dacascos and Michael Madsen. Production began in May 2021 in Los Angeles, lasting for 42 days. In December 2021, David Ramsey and Cerina Vincent were announced as cast members in the film, with the latter serving as Sutherland's replacement.

In July 2023, the production was granted a waiver, allowing the cast to participate in additional photography through the 2023 SAG-AFTRA strike.

In March 2025, executive producer Chris Jay announced that the film is "picture-locked" and undergoing color-correcting and sound mixing, hoping to present the film to distributors within a "couple months." In July 2025, their official Twitter account stated that the movie was complete and in the hands of their distribution agent.

== Release ==
Legend of the White Dragon was originally scheduled to be released in theaters 2020, but it was delayed due to the COVID-19 pandemic. In March 2023, the film's new release date was set on September 4, 2023. However, in July the film was delayed to the first quarter of 2024. The film was then scheduled to be released in limited theaters on September 4, 2024, but ended up missing that date for unknown reasons. On March 28, 2026, the film received a release date for August 28 of that year with Well Go USA Entertainment serving as its distributor.

== Reception ==
On the review aggregator website Rotten Tomatoes, 8% of 13 critics' reviews are positive, with an average rating of 4.30/10.
