= Guy Grundy =

Australian bodybuilder

Guy Anthony Grundy (born 9 July 1970) is an Australian bodybuilder, actor, Author, Producer & Director.

Born in Penrith, New South Wales, Grundy has placed first in the Mr. Australia championships twice and placed 2nd in the Mr. World competition twice (in 1999 and 2001).^{[1]} As a professional bodybuilder, he was photographed regularly for major muscle and fitness magazines such as Flex, Ironman, MuscleMag, Natural Muscle, Max Muscle & Muscle & Fitness to name a few. He has also written articles for magazines such as MuscleMag , Flex, Ironman, Muscle & Fitness, Max Muscle & Posedown Magazine. Since retiring from professional bodybuilding, Grundy has appeared as an actor in films such as Shutter Island, The Lackey, Six Feet Down Under, American Fighter, Enter the Fire & Mavrick n Grundy, along with TV shows such as Weird Weekends with Louis Theroux, Day's of our lives, Eric Andre Show, Dying is easy, City of Scars & Bane the Series. He appeared in over 15 National Commercials, 2 of which were Super Bowl Commercials. He has produced several series & feature films as well as authoring 2 books on his journey as a bodybuilder & Walking with the Soul Collector. He was featured in a documentary on bodybuilding by British documentary maker Louis Theroux as part of the Weird Weekends series.

== Bodybuilding statistics ==
- Height: 180 cm (5 ft 11 in)
- Weight (contest): 107 kg (236 lb)

== Contest history ==
1991 South Coast Division – Junior Place – 2nd

1992 NSW Championships Division – Light heavy weights Place – 1st

1992 South Pacific Titles Division – Light heavy weights Place – 2nd

1993 Australasian Championships 1st National show Division – Light heavy weights Place – 2nd

1994 Australasian Championships Division – Heavy weights Place – 2nd

1995 Australasian Championships Division – Heavy weights Place- Champion

1996 IFBB pro Qualifier Division – Open to all national champions Place – 2nd

1997 IFBB pro Qualifier Division – Open to all national champions Place – 2nd

1999 National Championships Place – Champion

1999 World Championships Place – 2nd

2000 World Championships Place – 2nd

2002 World Championships Place – 2nd
