= Ciara Hanna =

American actress and model

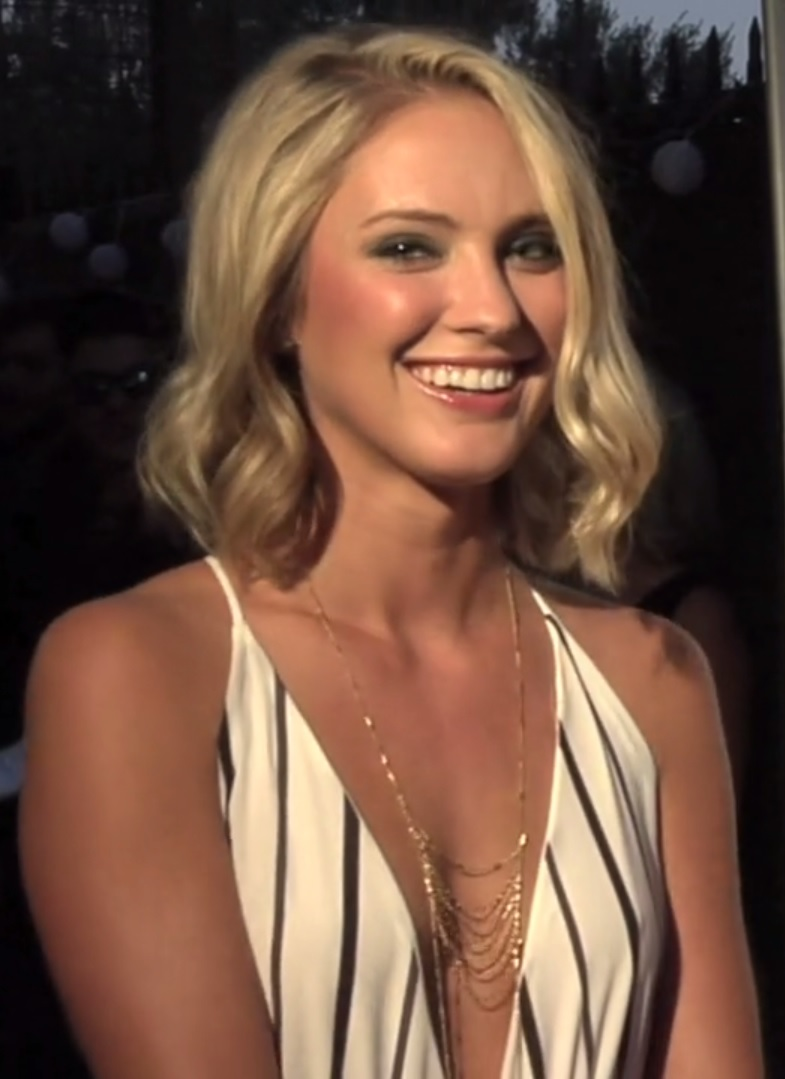
- Hanna in 2015
- Born: January 20, 1991 (age 35); Orange, California, United States
- Occupation: Actress
- Years active: 2009–present
- Known for: Gia Moran in Power Rangers Megaforce
- Partner(s): Chase Pino (2020–present; engaged)
- Children: 1

Ciara Hanna is an American actress. She is known for playing the roles of Gia Moran in Power Rangers Megaforce and Nicole Parker in Blood Lake: Attack of the Killer Lampreys.

== Personal life ==
On August 30, 2020, she became engaged to Chase Pino. Around September 2020, the couple announced they were expecting a child. On March 15, 2021, she gave birth to a baby boy named Canyon Cruz Pino.

== Filmography ==
=== Film ===
| Year | Title | Role | Notes |
|---|---|---|---|
| 2012 | Camp Virginovich | Jesse | |
| 2012 | Project X | Ecstasy Girl | Uncredited role |
| 2013 | All American Christmas Carol | Brandie | Direct-to-video |
| 2015 | Pernicious | Alex | |
| 2015 | It's Guys Night | Leslie | Short film |
| 2015 | 210 Halloween Spook Stories | Mother Ghost | Short film |
| 2016 | The Standoff | Christie | |
| 2017 | The Devil Came Near | Spike | |
| 2017 | Limelight | Amber | |
| 2019 | Devil's Revenge | Dana | |
| 2021 | Stars Fell On Alabama | Madison Belle | |
| 2022 | Sally Floss: Digital Detective | Lydia | |
| 2023 | Stars Fell Again | Madison Belle | |
| 2023 | Great White Throne Judgement | Lauren | |
| 2026 | Legend of the White Dragon | Vanessa | |

=== Television ===
| Year | Title | Role | Notes |
|---|---|---|---|
| 2009 | America's Next Top Model | Herself | Season 13, 1 episode |
| 2010 | Jonas | Hannah | Episode: "Boat Trip" |
| 2010–2011 | The Bold and the Beautiful | Summer/Forrester Model | 19 episodes |
| 2011 | The Protector | Marci Heller | Episode: "Help" |
| 2011 | Big Time Rush | Flirty Girl #1 | Episode: "Big Time Strike" |
| 2012 | Revenge | Amy | Episode: "Infamy" |
| 2012 | iCarly | Dana | Episode: "iGet Banned" |
| 2013–2014 | Power Rangers Megaforce | Gia Moran/Megaforce Yellow Ranger | Main role |
| 2014 | Sam & Cat | Lexi | Episode: "#SuperPsycho" |
| 2014 | New Girl | Karli | Episode: "The Last Wedding" |
| 2014 | Blood Lake: Attack of the Killer Lampreys | Nicole Parker | Television film |
| 2014 | Anger Management | Jade | Episode: "Charlie and Lacey Go For Broke" |
| 2015 | The Unauthorized Melrose Place Story | Heather Locklear | Television film |
| 2016 | #ThisIsCollege | Karen | 2 episodes |
| 2016 | Hawaii Five-0 | Mia | Episode: "I'ike Ke Ao (For the World to Know)" |
| 2016 | Hell's Kitchen | Herself | Episode: "Let the Catfights Begin" |
| 2018 | Power Rangers Ninja Steel | Gia Moran/Megaforce Yellow Ranger | Episode: "Dimensions in Danger" |
| 2018, 2023 | Annoying Orange | Balloon/Pin Cushion/Yellow (voices) | 2 episodes |
| 2022 | The Bay | Marly Garrett Nelson | 5 episodes |
| 2023 | How I Met Your Father | Hot Female Doctor | Episode: "Working Girls" |
| 2023 | Child of Love | Skye | Television film |
| 2025 | 99 to Beat | Herself/Contestant | Semifinals; 15th place |

=== Music video ===
| Year | Title | Artist/Band | Role | Note |
|---|---|---|---|---|
| 2009 | "Ayo Technology" | Skyla | Skyla's friend | |
| 2010 | "Hey Baby, Here's That Song You Wanted" | Blessthefall | Beau's Girlfriend | |
| 2011 | "Nothing Without You" | AiTan | Bride | |
| 2012 | "Rock Baby Eye" | AiTan | Dancer | |
| 2012 | "Blood in My Eyes" | Sum 41 | Jessica Kill | |
| 2014 | "Jealous" | Nick Jonas | Girl dancing | Mainly danced with old man |
| 2015 | "Cake by the Ocean" | DNCE | | |
| 2016 | "Stupid For You" | Waterparks | Girl in crowd | |
| 2017 | "Do You Love Me" | Jay Sean | | |
