= List of Marvel Comics characters: V =

== Vagabond ==
Vagabond (Priscilla Lyons) is the former partner and girlfriend of Nomad (Jack Monroe). She prevented Black Racer's assassination attempt on Sidewinder. She thwarted and captured Dr. Karl Malus during his attempt to take over Power Broker, Inc. She was recruited and trained by the Scourge organization; during her training she had a change of heart and decided to help the U.S. Agent shut down the Scourge organization. Later she was being considered as a potential recruit for the Initiative program, according to Civil War: Battle Damage Report.

=== Other characters named Vagabond ===
Vagabond (real name Pat Murphy) is a superhero, a police officer who dressed as a homeless man, who appeared in U.S.A. Comics #2–4.

== Vamp ==
Vamp is a Corporation agent in the Marvel Universe. The character, created by Roy Thomas, Don Glut, and John Buscema, first appeared in Captain America #217 in January 1978. Within the context of the stories, Vamp has an evil alter-ego called Animus and infiltrates S.H.I.E.L.D. She is killed by the Scourge of the Underworld.

Arnim Zola created a Vamp/Animus proto-husk creature, which would encounter Deadpool on two separate occasions.

== Rachel Van Helsing ==
Rachel Van Helsing is a vampire hunter, created by Archie Goodwin and Gene Colan, who first appeared in Tomb of Dracula #3 (July 1972). She is the granddaughter of Abraham Van Helsing, and trained a vampire hunter since childhood by Quincy Harker after Dracula killed her parents. On one of her missions, Rachel was held hostage by two of Dracula's brides who phoned Harker, who was on the verge of killing Dracula, and told him to leave Dracula alone or Rachel would die. Harker agreed to the brides' demands, much to Rachel's frustration. The brides then let Rachel go. She later fought alongside hunters Harker, Taj Nital, Frank Drake, and Blade, during which time she developed an uneasy romantic relationship with Drake.
After Harker's death, Rachel retires from vampire hunting, but Dracula turns her into a vampire. Overcoming his control, she asks Wolverine to kill her, which he does. Frank Drake avenges Rachel's death by aiding Doctor Strange in destroying all vampires on Earth.

=== Rachel Van Helsing in other media ===
Rachel Van Helsing appears in Tomb of Dracula, voiced by Mami Koyama in the original Japanese version and Melanie McQueen in the English dub.

== Michael Van Patrick ==
MVP

Publication information
- Publisher: Marvel Comics
- First appearance: Avengers: The Initiative #1 (March 2007)
- Created by: Dan Slott; Stefano Caselli

In-story information
- Alter ego: Michael Ian Van Patrick
- Team affiliations: (All); The Initiative (Michael, Van & Patrick); Shadow Initiative (Michael & Patrick); Counter Force; New Warriors (Patrick); Avengers Resistance
- Notable aliases: MVP (sometimes written M.V.P.)
- Abilities: Peak physical condition

Michael Ian Van Patrick is a character appearing in American comic books published by Marvel Comics. The character was created by Dan Slott and Stefano Caselli. Although the character died in his debut appearance, he was cloned after his death and his clones continued to play roles within the ongoing Avengers: The Initiative series.

Michael Van Patrick's origins trace back to scientist Josef Reinstein, later retroactively changed to an alias of Abraham Erskine. On his death, Erskine left papers, which covered years of research and findings that the government had not seen fit to classify to his grandson Brian Van Patrick. Brian studied his grandfather's work, particularly his work on growing, preparing and serving the most wholesome and nutritional foods and a challenging experimental program of isometric exercises. Brian used the research during the early life and development of his son Michael, helping him achieve his potential.

The events of "Civil War" required all superpowered individuals to register with the American government, with at least some of these individuals being sent to the training camp Camp Hammond. Michael joined the program under the codename MVP, along with old and new characters to make up the cast of the Avengers: The Initiative. During the first day of training at Camp Hammond, MVP is inadvertently killed during a combat simulator exercise.

=== First clone of MVP ===
Though Yellowjacket disapproves the idea of cloning MVP, Secretary of the Superhuman Armed Forces Henry Peter Gyrich ordered that MVP's death remain secret and sanctioned the cloning. As the clone was grown to its original's age, all of his original's skills and abilities were programmed into him. The first clone is sent to his family's farm in Liberty, Kentucky, with a false story that he had failed the Initiative program because of his lack of powers. The clone, who realizes that his memories are not his own and that he will never be the real Michael Van Patrick, elects to stay with his family.

=== Scarlet Spiders ===
Three more clones, developed the same time as the first but with added genetic material donated from Baron Von Blitzschlag, were programmed with MVP's skills and abilities along with those of Spider-Man. The three clones, Michael, Van and Patrick, were given redesigned Iron Spider suits that Spider-Man had worn during the Civil War. The three are later revealed to be part of the Shadow Initiative black ops group under the command of Gyrich.

=== KIA ===
The results of the previous clonings impressed Initiative administrators enough to attempt to fill places within the Fifty-State Initiative with further clones. In the Avengers: The Initiative first multi-part story; Killed in Action (starting issue #8), a new clone is fitted with the Tactigon, a weapon previously used by Armory, and sets forth on a murderous rampage through Camp Hammond in an attempt to seek revenge for MVP's death. After being defeated by a large superhero group effort, KIA later joins the Assassins Guild.

=== Powers, abilities and equipment of Michael Van Patrick ===
In Avengers: The Initiative #2, Von Blitzschlag refers to MVP as an "Übermensch", a perfect human specimen, down to the cellular level. This perfection is displayed in his physical abilities. Though compared to Captain America, MVP's abilities were revealed to have come as a result of the "revolutionary" diet and an "ultimate" isometric exercise regime he completed, rather than the super-soldier serum.

The first clone has those same abilities, with the Scarlet Spiders additionally having the skills, reflexes/reactions and moves of Spider-Man programmed into them to the limit of regular human ability.

Michael, Van and Patrick's Scarlet Spider suits, a redesign of Tony Stark's Iron Spider armor (previously used by Spider-Man), are supported by systems similar to that of Stark's classic Iron Man design. In the Scarlet Spider's first appearance, Avengers: The Initiative #3, the suit features several devices, including four mechanical spider-arms or "waldoes" on each suit, one more than on the original, along with cloaking devices and a short-range GPS microwave communication system.

Attached to the "KIA" Michael Van Patrick is Armory's former weapon, known as the Tactigon, which was detached when she was expelled from the Initiative program. It is a multi-dimensional alien device that, once attached to a body, is able to shift into a variety of weapons and tools.

=== Reception of Michael Van Patrick ===
The IGN reviewer considered MVP to be one of the "instantly likable characters" in the first issue, while a Comics Bulletin reviewer expanded on this by saying MVP especially "could help carry this title". However, MVP's death at the end of the issue was met with concern "while shocking, [MVP's death] undermines the advancement of the rest of the issue". Despite concerns that writer Dan Slott had cavalierly killed MVP, IGN reviewer stated that "having seen the emotional fallout of that incident, I can see why it was so important to do that. Clearly the death in the first issue added immeasurable weight to the situation". MVP also received criticism from TheGamer reviewer, Charlie Green, stating that MVP hurt the Marvel comics involving him, "This is essentially what would have happened if nothing particularly exciting happened to [Captain America]".

== Vanguard ==
Vanguard (Nikolai Krylenko) is a mutant in the Marvel Universe. Created by Bill Mantlo and Carmine Infantino, the character first appeared in Iron Man #109 in April 1978. Within the context of the stories, Vanguard is one of the Soviet Super-Soldiers and the son of Sergei Krylov. He is trained as a soldier and comes into conflict with Iron Man, Jack of Hearts, and other Avengers. After dying and being resurrected by his father during the Dire Wraith invasion of Russia, Vanguard becomes the new Red Guardian and leads the Winter Guard.

Krylenko is the brother of Laynia Petrovna / Darkstar. He is a mutant, capable of generating a body-wide force field that repels electromagnetic and kinetic energy. He typically focuses this field through a medium, such as the vibranium shield supplied to him by Executive Security Committee or through a sickle and hammer that he usually carries. He also directs this force against the earth itself to obtain flight. Krylenko wears a more advanced suit than previous Red Guardians, which is lined with circuitry that works in conjunction with the compact computer on his shield, not only enabling the guided flight and return of what he's using to focus his mutant energy through their digital connection, but the amplification of the effects of his own energy field.

== Vargas ==
Vargas is a supervillain in the Marvel Universe. The character, created by Chris Claremont and Salvador Larroca, first appeared in X-Treme X-Men #1 in 2001. Vargas comes into conflict with the X-Men while searching for the diaries of Destiny .

== Veil ==
Veil is the name of two superheroes in Marvel Comics.

=== Madeline Berry ===
Veil (Madeline Berry) was created by Christos Gage and Mike McKone. She first appeared in Avengers Academy #1 (August 2010). She has the ability to change into a gaseous form, which enables her to sneak around without being detected and renders her immune to most forms of attack.

Berry learns that her powers are causing her molecules to drift apart, so that she will eventually die or fade from existence, and decides to enjoy the limited time she has left, quitting the academy and joining Jeremy Briggs' corporation. She soon finds a cure, but it renders her powerless. She then returns to regular high school, using her training to defend herself from bullies.

=== Veil in other media ===
The Madeline Berry incarnation of Veil appears as a playable character in Lego Marvel's Avengers.

== Velocidad ==
Velocidad (Gabriel Cohuelo) is a character appearing in American comic books published by Marvel Comics. Created by Matt Fraction and Kieron Gillen, he first appeared in The Uncanny X-Men #527 in 2010, part of the "Generation Hope" storyline.

Gabriel is a 16-year-old mutant from Mexico City. He is unable to control his mutant powers until assisted by Hope Summers. After this incident, Gabriel decides to follow Hope on her mission to retrieve the remaining Lights. After recruiting Oya and Primal, the group travels to Japan, and Gabriel participates in his first mission - subduing the mutant Kenji Uedo, who has lost control of his bio-mechanical powers and is attacking Tokyo.

Velocidad is later captured by O*N*E, who harnessed his powers while merging him with Warlock. When Wolverine finds Velocidad, he honors Velocidad's request and kills him. Velocidad is revived by the Five on Krakoa and joins the X-Corps.

=== Powers and abilities of Velocidad ===
Velocidad is able to slow down time around him, making him appear to move very fast. Because Velocidad's powers work by accelerating him through time, the use of his powers causes rapid aging.

== Vengeance ==
Vengeance is the name of several characters in Marvel Comics.

=== Michael Badilino ===
Michael Badilino, an ex-member of the New York City Police Department, is one-third of an "Organic Medallion of Power"; the other two are Danny Ketch and Johnny Blaze. He possesses powers more in line with those of the Zarathos version of the Ghost Rider, although he also possesses the Penance Stare and his motorcycle seemed to share characteristics with Noble Kale. As Vengeance, Badilino has a deep purple skull, large fangs protruding from his upper jaw, and backswept curved horns.

=== Kowalski ===
Deputy Kowalski was a normal cop in a small town until Ghost Rider rode in one day. It was then that Kowalski was kidnapped by a local cannibal who cut off his hand. Events transpired that led to Kowalski escaping and developing a wrath against the Ghost Rider. His attention was brought to the hellfire shotgun in possession of Badilino. After purchasing the gun—and discovering to Badilino's surprise that it will work for Kowalski—Kowalski was recruited by agents of Zadkiel and told to wait in the middle of the desert for the Ghost Rider. Johnny Blaze (as Ghost Rider) did arrive in hot pursuit of Danny Ketch (as a new incarnation of Ghost Rider). Kowalski did manage to get a shot in on Blaze. Although it was a minor setback Blaze resumed his pursuit of Ketch. Left in the desert, Kowalski soon found himself transformed into the new Vengeance, sporting green flames and a hook for his right hand, after Ketch returned the powers of the Spirits of Vengeance to Earth.

=== Vengeance in other media ===
The Michael Badilino incarnation of Vengeance appears in Ghost Rider (2007).

== Octavia Vermis ==
Octavia Vermis is a character appearing in American comic books published by Marvel Comics. Created by Karla Pacheco and Pere Pérez, she first appeared in Spider-Woman (vol. 7) #2 (July 2020).

Octavia Vermis is the daughter of Otto Vermis. After escaping from Hydra, Vermis had the High Evolutionary create a clone girl named Ophelia who she could raise herself. Spider-Woman forms a reluctant alliance with Vermis while seeking to stabilize her own condition. However, Vermis betrays Spider-Woman and the High Evolutionary, seeking to claim the latter's technology. In the ensuing battle, Vermis is knocked into the High Evolutionary's array, transforming her into a dinosaur-like form. The High Evolutionary states that he may have the means to cure Vermis, but takes her in for the time being.

== Otto Vermis ==
Count Otto Vermis is a character appearing in American comic books published by Marvel Comics. His only appearance (in main Marvel continuity) was in Marvel Spotlight #32 (February 1977), the book that featured the first appearance of Spider-Woman.

Otto Vermis was the leader of Hydra's European branch and the father of Octavia Vermis. Vermis recruited Jessica Drew (whom by that time went by the name "Arachne") into Hydra at a time when she was suffering from amnesia and had no clue about her own past. He then manipulated her into falling in love with fellow agent Jared and attempting to kill Nick Fury. Vermis promised to find out the truth about Arachne's past and made a sincere effort in that direction, although the findings were incomplete and misleading. Ultimately, he kept what little he knew hidden from Arachne until soon before his death.

== Vertigo ==
Vertigo is the name of two supervillains appearing in Marvel Comics.

=== Salem's Seven ===
Vertigo

Publication information
- Publisher: Marvel Comics
- First appearance: Fantastic Four #186 (September 1977)
- Created by: Len Wein and George Pérez

In-story information
- Species: Human
- Team affiliations: Salem's Seven; Frightful Four
- Abilities: Magic

Vertigo first appeared in Fantastic Four #186 (September, 1977), and was created by Len Wein and George Pérez.

Vertigo is a member of Salem's Seven, a group of witches led by Nicholas Scratch. She is the daughter of Scratch, and granddaughter of Agatha Harkness.

Vertigo is capable of wielding magic on par with the rest of the New Salemites. In addition, she is able to induce debilitating vertigo and nausea.

=== Savage Land Mutate ===
Vertigo

Publication information
- Publisher: Marvel Comics
- First appearance: Marvel Fanfare #1 (March 1982)
- Created by: Chris Claremont (writer); Michael Golden (artist)

In-story information
- Species: Savage Land Mutate
- Team affiliations: Savage Land Mutates; Marauders; Femizons
- Abilities: Ability to induce extreme disorientation, nausea and unconsciousness

Vertigo debuted in Marvel Fanfare #1-4 (March 1982), and was created by writer Chris Claremont and artist Michael Golden.

Vertigo initially appears as a member of the Savage Land Mutates, empowered by Magneto. Later, although not a mutant, she joined the Marauders, a group of mutant assassins working for Mister Sinister.

Vertigo is an artificially enhanced mutate possessing the ability to project waves of psionic energy into her environment which affect the nervous systems of other living beings, distorting their physical perceptions and sense of balance. This power induces effects ranging from mild disorientation and vertigo to unconsciousness. Vertigo can focus her power on one or more individuals, or project it outward from herself in all directions, affecting everyone within her range of influence. Vertigo is not immune to her own powers, as she was thrown off balance when Thor reflected her psychic waves with Mjolnir.

=== Vertigo in other media ===
- The Savage Land Mutate version of Vertigo appears in X-Men: The Animated Series, voiced by Megan Smith. This version is a follower of Mister Sinister, who genetically modified her with Magneto's DNA to strengthen her powers.
- The Salem's Seven version of Vertigo appears in The Avengers: United They Stand episode "The Sorceress's Apprentice".
- The Savage Land Mutate version of Vertigo appears in Wolverine and the X-Men, voiced by Vanessa Marshall. This version is a member of Mister Sinister's Marauders.
- The Savage Land Mutate version of Vertigo appears as a boss in the video game Deadpool. This version is a member of Mister Sinister's Marauders.
- The Salem's Seven version of Vertigo appears in Agatha All Along, portrayed by Okwui Okpokwasili. This version is the leader of the Salem's Seven. She leads them in search of Agatha Harkness until they are killed by Lilia Calderu.

== Count Vicaro ==
Count Vicaro is a character appearing in American comic books published by Marvel Comics. The first vampire in Marvel Comics, Vicaro made his only appearance in "Marvel Mystery Comics" #35 (1942).

Count Vicaro was a sorcerer who became a vampire in 1642 and was destroyed by Angel in 1942.

== Victorious ==
Victorious is the name of two characters appearing in American comic books published by Marvel Comics.

=== Zora Vukovic ===
Zora Vukovic was the daughter of Symkarian spies who had infiltrated their neighboring country, Latveria. Not knowing her Symkarian origin, Zora grew up as a Latverian with genuine love for the country. She eventually became the leader of a rebel force opposing Latveria's tyrant president for life. She infiltrated Castle Doom to confirm the rumors of Doctor Doom's return and to seek his help. Zora's words swayed Doom from exile, and inspired him to reclaim Latveria's throne. In return for her actions, Doom bestowed Zora with a portion of the Power Cosmic so that she could become Latveria's new champion, a symbol of inspiration named Victorious.

==== Zora Vukovic in other media ====
- Zora Vukovic appears in Marvel Puzzle Quest.
- Zora Vukovic appears in Marvel Future Fight.

== Victorius ==
Victorius

Publication information
- Publisher: Marvel Comics
- First appearance: Astonishing Tales #18 (June 1973)
- Created by: Mike Friedrich and Dan Adkins

In-story information
- Alter ego: Victor Conrad
- Team affiliations: A.I.M. Cult of Entropy
- Notable aliases: Scientist Supreme
- Abilities: Peak physical condition, assorted combat training

Victorius (Victor Conrad) is a character appearing in American comic books related to Marvel Comics. The character, created by Mike Friedrich and Dan Atkins, first appeared in Astonishing Tales #18 (June 1973). He succeeded in duplicating the Super-Soldier Serum for himself and was a physically perfect human being.

Victor Conrad first takes over as the A.I.M.'s Scientist Supreme, but he is defeated by Ka-Zar and Bobbi Morse. Victorius later makes himself the death-worshiping Cult of Entropy's leader, stealing the Cosmic Cube and using it to create Jude the Entropic Man as a means of spreading destruction. Victorius was defeated by Captain America and the Thing before he and his rebellious creation were transformed into a radiant crystal by the Man-Thing.

== Viper ==
Viper is the name of four supervillains appearing in American comic books published by Marvel Comics. The first version, Jordan Stryke, first appeared in Captain America #157 (January 1973), created by Steve Englehart, Steve Gerber, Sal Buscema and John Verpoorten. Ophelia Sarkissian is the second version, and a third version appears in recent years.

=== Jordan Stryke ===
Viper

Publication information
- Publisher: Marvel Comics
- First appearance: Captain America vol. 1 #157 (January 1973)
- Created by: Steve Englehart; Steve Gerber; Sal Buscema; John Verpoorten

In-story information
- Alter ego: Jordan Stryke
- Team affiliations: Serpent Squad; Secret Empire
- Notable aliases: Jordan Dixon
- Abilities: Skilled advertiser, chemist and debater Venom-tipped claws and darts

Jordan Stryke (a.k.a. Jordan Dixon) is the first version of Viper. He was the brother of Leopold Stryke, also known as Eel. They each formed costumed identities without the other realizing this fact. Together they joined the Crime Wave of the Cowled Commander, and the Viper battled the Falcon and Captain America. During the course of the fight, Viper managed to poison his opponents with darts and escaped. Later, the Falcon discovered the Viper in his home after tracking his alias (through an offhand comment made by the Viper indicating that he was involved in advertising) and captured him. Escaping in an ensuing battle with Plantman and the rest of the Crime Wave, Viper's identity was discovered by his brother Eel. Soon after, the Crime Wave was defeated by Captain America and the Falcon, and they were sent to prison.

Later escaping prison with his brother and the help of the Cobra, the trio formed the original Serpent Squad and attacked Captain America at his girlfriend's home in Virginia. Despite new weapons added to his arsenal, including the Venom-Firer and prosthetic fangs, Viper and his partners were returned to jail.

=== Viper (Leon Murtaugh) ===
A third version of Viper appeared along with Sin's new Serpent Squad in the pages of Captain America. His name is Leon Murtaugh. He breaks Crossbones out of jail and later attacked the White House, but he was stopped by Captain America. Following that, he and the rest of the Squad took part in a plot to use madbombs to cause rioting in New York City. After being captured, Viper asked to go into the Witness Protection Program in exchange for information. He had only been in the program for less than a month when he was targeted by the villain killer Scourge and killed.

=== Hobgoblin's Viper ===
Roderick Kingsley sold one of Ophelia Sarkissian's Viper outfits to an unnamed criminal, who became the next Viper.

== V.I.R.G.I.L. ==
V.I.R.G.I.L. (Virtual Integrated Rapidly-evolving Grid-based Intelligent Lifeform) is a character appearing in comic books involving Marvel Comics. The character, created by Dan Abnett, Andy Lanning and Yancey Labat, first appeared in Force Works vol. 1 #18 (October 1995).

V.I.R.G.I.L. is a vicious and cold-hearted A.I. program from an alternate future.

== Visimajoris ==
Visimajoris is a demon who has clashed with Doctor Strange.

== Vision ==
Vision is the name of three characters appearing in American comic books published by Marvel Comics.

== Viv Vision ==
- Further reading: Viv Vision at the Comic Book DB (archived from the original); Viv Vision at the Grand Comics Database

Vivian "Viv" Vision is an android in Marvel Comics. She was created by Tom King and Gabriel Hernandez Walta and first appeared in Vision (vol. 3) #1 (January 2016).

Viv, along with her brother Vin, was created by Vision, using a combination of his and his wife Virginia's brainwaves, as part of an attempt to create a family. The siblings are sent to Alexander Hamilton High School, but assigned different schedules. Both children are attacked by Eric Williams (Grim Reaper), with Viv more seriously damaged than her brother. Vision repairs her with the help of Tony Stark.

When Viv learns that her mother killed a classmate she befriended, she becomes distraught and begins to resent her mother. When both her brother and mother die, she and Vision try to carry on with their family life.

She joins the teen superhero team the Champions, alongside Ms. Marvel, Spider-Man, Nova, the Hulk, and the young, time-displaced Cyclops.

During the story arc Worlds Collide, Viv is captured by the High Evolutionary who evolves her into a human. She later apparently sacrifices herself to save Earth and Counter-Earth, but is actually transported into another dimension. Believing Viv to be dead, Vision constructs a second Viv, dubbed Viv 2.0. The original Viv manages to return to reality, but not before the second Viv is activated. Viv 2.0 attempts to kill the original but is damaged and becomes brain-dead. The original Viv transplants her consciousness to the other Viv's body, effectively restoring her to her android state.

In time, she develops romantic feelings for her teammate Ironheart (Riri Williams), surprising her with a kiss. Riri reacts with revulsion due to internalised homophobia, but after a later incident with Blackheart who exploited several of the Champions' (including Riri's) own self-doubts and turned them against their teammates, it is Viv's affection (and a returned Viv 2.0, alive inside Viv) which snaps Riri out of his control and finally acknowledge her friend's feelings.

Viv possesses the same powers as her father, including superhuman strength, intangibility and flight. She also possesses a jewel on her forehead that absorbs solar energy.

=== Viv Vision in other media ===
- Viv Vision appears as a playable character in Marvel Avengers Academy.
- Viv Vision appears as a playable character in Lego Marvel Super Heroes 2 as part of the Champions DLC.
- Viv Vision appears as a playable character in Marvel Contest of Champions.

== Volcana ==
Volcana (Marsha Rosenberg) is a character appearing in American comic books published by Marvel Comics. The character first appeared in Secret Wars #3 (July 1984) and was created by Jim Shooter and Mike Zeck.

Marsha Rosenberg is a day care employee from Denver who, along with her friend Skeeter, is transported to Battleworld during the events of Secret Wars. Seeking power and respect, she and Skeeter agree to serve Doctor Doom in exchange for superpowers. Utilizing alien technology, Doom gives Rosenberg the ability to transform into a molten lava-like form and generate powerful thermal energy blasts. Taking the name Volcana, Rosenberg allies with Doom and battles She-Hulk. Volcana develops a relationship with the supervillain Molecule Man.

=== Volcana in other media ===
Volcana appears in The Super Hero Squad Show, voiced by Grey DeLisle. This version is a member of Doctor Doom's Lethal Legion.

== Volla ==
Volla is a fictional character appearing in American comic books published by Marvel Comics. She is based on the Norse mythology character Fulla who first appeared in Thor #127 (April 1966) and was adapted by Stan Lee and Jack Kirby.

Volla is a known Asgardian prophetess. Volla dies after making known her prophecies of Ragnarok. Those with the courage and bravery to journey into the Realm of the Dead may still obtain her predictions. There, she exists as a simple wraith.

=== Volla in other media ===
Volla appears as a non-playable character in Marvel: Ultimate Alliance, voiced by Nika Futterman.

== Lucia von Bardas ==
- First appearance: Secret War #1 (April 2004)
- Created by: Brian Michael Bendis; Gabriele Dell'Otto
- Species: Human Cyborg
- Further reading: Lucia von Bardas at the Comic Book DB (archived from the original); Lucia von Bardas at the Grand Comics Database

Lucia von Bardas is a supervillain who first appeared in the 2004 storyline Secret War. She was created by Brian Michael Bendis and Gabriele Dell'Otto.

The character is a Latverian woman who used to teach at the University of North Carolina in the United States. After Victor von Doom was deposed as the leader of Latveria, the Americans help von Bardas get elected as the country's prime minister. She then begins publicly mending the ties between the two countries. In truth, she is secretly funding American technology-based supercriminals through the Tinkerer. The United Nations espionage agency S.H.I.E.L.D. uncovered this, but the President of the United States declines to take action, believing that relationship is relatively good and that they can simply negotiate. S.H.I.E.L.D. director Nick Fury subsequently gathered a group of superheroes consisting of the Black Widow, Captain America, Daredevil, Luke Cage, Spider-Man, and Wolverine, as well as superpowered S.H.I.E.L.D. agent Daisy Johnson, for an undercover mission to overthrow the Latverian government and assassinate von Bardas. In Latveria, Johnson used her seismic powers to take down Castle Doom, apparently killing von Bardas.

Lucia von Bardas survives to become a deformed cyborg. She later gains a more organic appearance with only a cybernetic eye exposed.

=== Lucia von Bardas in other media ===
- Lucia von Bardas appears in Fantastic Four: World's Greatest Heroes, voiced by Venus Terzo.
- Lucia von Bardas appears in The Avengers: Earth's Mightiest Heroes, voiced by Kirsten Potter.
- Lucia von Bardas appears in Marvel: Ultimate Alliance 2, voiced by Lani Minella.

== Cynthia Von Doom ==
Cynthia von Doom

Publication information
- Publisher: Marvel Comics
- First appearance: Astonishing Tales #8 (1972)
- Created by: Gerry Conway; Gene Colan; Tom Palmer

In-story information
- Species: Human
- Abilities: Magic

Cynthia von Doom is a character appearing in American comic books published by Marvel Comics. She is the mother of Doctor Doom and has magic-based abilities. Her powers and knowledge of spells have allowed her to contact demons and make deals with them for power. Cynthia von Doom first appeared in Astonishing Tales #8 and was created by Gerry Conway, Gene Colan, and Tom Palmer.

=== Cynthia von Doom in other media ===
Cynthia von Doom, also known as Coco von Doom, appears in The Super Hero Squad Show, voiced by Charlie Adler.

== Valeria von Frazen ==
Valeria von Frazen was created by writer Roy Thomas and artist Larry Lieber, and first appeared in Marvel Super-Heroes #20 (February 1969).

Valeria von Frazen was a childhood friend of Victor von Doom. They were lovers until Doom left for the United States, leaving Frazen behind. Doom later sacrificed Frazen to augment his own mystical powers, with her skin being incorporated into his armor. Frazen's full name was revealed in the series Captain America (2026), where she returned as a servant of Mephisto.

== Friedrich Von Roehm ==
Friedrich Von Roehm was a member of the Hellfire Club, acting as the Black Rook before his death. The character debuted in The New Mutants #22 (December 1984) by Chris Claremont and Bill Sienkiewicz. Von Roehm possessed a hereditary ability similar to lycanthropy and served Selene. He was killed by Nimrod during a battle with the X-Men.

== Vox ==
Vox is the name of two characters appearing in American comic books published by Marvel Comics.

=== Initiative character ===
Vox is a member of the Fifty State Initiative team called Action Pack.

When the Fifty-State Initiative was deactivated, Vox formed the Paladins with former Fifty-State Initiative members Fifty-One, Pioneer, Prima Donna, and Think Tank.

=== Kree programming ===
The second Vox is a Super-Inhuman program who was created by a rogue Kree faction called the Kree Imperium to target the Inhumans. When Black Bolt took down many of its pawns, Vox joined its masters in getting away.

After the Kree form an alliance with their longtime enemies the Skrull following the "Empyre" storyline, Vox goes rogue and fuses with fragments of the Supreme Intelligence to become Vox Supreme. After numerous fights with Captain Marvel (Carol Danvers), Vox is defeated and remanded to the Raft.

Vox later escapes, only to be destroyed by Captain Marvel and her clone Binary.
