= The Punisher (1986 series) =

1986 comic book limited series

- Cover to The Punisher #1.

Publication information
- Publisher: Marvel Comics
- Schedule: Monthly
- Format: Limited series
- Publication date: January–May 1986
- No. of issues: 5
- Main character: The Punisher

Creative team
- Written by: Steven Grant; Jo Duffy (5)
- Penciller(s): Mike Zeck (1-4); Mike Vosburg (5)
- Inker: John Beatty
- Letterer: Ken Bruzenak
- Colorist(s): Mike Zeck (1); Bob Sharen (2-5)
- Editor: Carl Potts

Collected editions
- Circle of Blood (softcover): ISBN 0-87135-394-6
- Circle of Blood (hardcover): ISBN 0785123318

The Punisher is a five-issue comic book limited series published by Marvel Comics in 1986, starring the fictional vigilante the Punisher. It was written by Steven Grant, penciled by Mike Zeck, and inked by John Beatty.

== Background and publication ==
Marvel published the miniseries starting with a double-sized first issue in January 1986, while the remaining four issues were normal sized. The series was written by Steven Grant, penciled by Mike Zeck, and inked by John Beatty. Zeck and Beatty had previously worked together on Secret Wars.

The initial issue had a banner indicating that the series would be four issues long; however, the series had always been intended to have five issues, and was announced as such in Marvel Age. The banner was an error that Grant and Zeck reported in enough time for it to be corrected for issue #2, but the error recurred in issues #3 and 4, while issue #5 again correctly identified The Punisher as a five-issue series. Grant and Zeck both suspected that because four-issue limited series were so standard in Marvel publications at the time, the production department had become accustomed to simply pasting a "in a Four-Issue Limited Series" template on every issue of every limited series.

By coincidence, Grant and Zeck's original proposal had been for the series to run four issues, with the fourth issue being double-sized, but Marvel was against this so they split their plans for issue four into two issues. In another coincidence, Zeck fell behind on the series deadlines while working on the first issue, so the editor both took him off coloring the series and reassigned the penciling of issue #5 to Mike Vosburg, meaning that in the end Zeck only worked on four issues of The Punisher. The splash page of issue #5 has a caption stating, "Special thanks to true pros Mike Vosburg (pencils), Jo Duffy (script), and Big John Beatty (inks)." The covers were paintings by Mike Zeck and Phil Zimelman.

Staying true to its gritty premise, The Punisher featured several uncommon occurrences in Marvel Comics during the mid-1980s, including a suicide, the death of a child, and implied sexual activity. In issue #4, the warden of Rykers Prison (Marvel's version of Rikers Prison) commits suicide when faced with the options of battling the Punisher or going to prison himself. In issue #3, Marcus Coriander, a small-time numbers runner used as a proxy crime boss by the Kingpin, accidentally kills an innocent girl while exchanging gunfire with the Punisher. In issue #2, the Punisher is nursed back to health by Angela, a plant by Punisher's enemies "The Trust". In one panel, Angela states that "everything I have is yours". In the next panel, the Punisher is shown walking away from a bed containing a nude Angela, indicating that they had sex.

== Plot ==
Newly imprisoned in Rykers following the events of The Spectacular Spider-Man #78-83, the Punisher is sprung from jail by the Trust, a citizens organization whose purpose is to fight crime using the Punisher’s example by brainwashing criminals and making them part of their "Punishment Squad". A man named Alaric leads a group that dons uniforms reminiscent of the Punisher's attire and is responsible for eliminating criminals.

After being rescued by Angela, an operative of the Trust, the Punisher falsely tells Ben Urich that he has killed the Kingpin, who actually staged his own death, in order to start a gang war where the criminals will kill themselves. This occurs, but the Punisher then becomes concerned by the large number of innocent people caught in the crossfire, so he forces mob leaders at gunpoint to have a meeting to stop the gang war. Force is necessary, because the Trust had previously used a purported gang meeting to kill a number of criminals.

Betrayed by The Trust, The Punisher attacks Alaric's home only to find that Jigsaw has been brainwashed and is made a member of the Punishment Squad. The Punisher defeats Jigsaw, but is captured by Alaric and placed in the conditioning room. The Punisher escapes because his weapons and clothing were not removed. The Punisher then forces Alaric to implicate the Trust in his prison break and the Punishment Squad's murders. Angela, sitting in a jeep on the mansion bridge waiting for Alaric, sees the Punisher leave the mansion. Jumping to the conclusion that Frank killed her lover, she guns the jeep towards him. Frank shoots the jeep's grill, forcing Angela off the road, precariously situated on the railing of bridge. Frank walks away as the jeep begins to slip.

== Prints ==
=== Issues ===
1. Circle of Blood (January 1986)
2. Back to the War (February 1986)
3. Slaughter Day (March 1986)
4. Final Solution (April 1986)
5. Final Solution, Part 2 (April 1986)

=== Collected editions ===
The series was reprinted in The Punisher Magazine issues 1-3 (1989) in oversized format. It has been collected into a single volume title Circle of Blood as a softcover (1989, ISBN 0-87135-394-6) and a hardcover (2007, ISBN 0-7851-2331-8). The complete series is also included in the black-and-white Essential Punisher, Vol. 1 (2004, ISBN 0-7851-2375-X).
