= Shuma-Gorath =

Marvel Comics fictional character

- Shuma-Gorath as shown on a trading card (art by Jim Nelson)

Publication information
- Publisher: Marvel Comics
- First appearance: Marvel Premiere #10 (September 1973)
- Created by: Steve Englehart; Frank Brunner

In-story information
- Species: Great Old Ones / Many-angled ones
- Place of origin: Multiverse
- Notable aliases: Great One Who Slumbers; Conqueror of Midnight; All-Killer of the Dawn; Father of All Evil; Lord of Chaos
- Abilities: Vast mystical powers; Reality manipulation; Energy projection; Shapeshifting; Teleportation; Immortality; Levitation

Shuma-Gorath (/ˈʃuːmə ˈɡɔːræθ/ SHOO-mə GOR-ath) is a character appearing in American comic books published by Marvel Comics. Created by Steve Englehart and Frank Brunner, the character first appeared in Marvel Premiere #10 (September 1973). Shuma-Gorath belongs to the Great Old Ones, a race of ancient eldritch beings who predate Earth. It is a recurring antagonist to the superhero Doctor Strange.

== Publication history ==
Shuma-Gorath first appears as an adversary for Doctor Strange in Marvel Premiere #10 (September 1973), created by writer Steve Englehart and artist Frank Brunner. The character's name is taken from Robert E. Howard's short story "The Curse of the Golden Skull," which features a dying magician named Rotath invoking the "iron-bound books of Shuma-Gorath" in a curse against humanity.

Heroic Signatures holds the rights to the Shuma-Gorath name, due to its use in Howard's story, along with additional elements related to the Conan the Barbarian and Kull of Atlantis mythos, which is licensed to Marvel Comics.

== Fictional character biography ==
During Earth's pre-history Shuma-Gorath ruled the world, and demanded human sacrifice until eventually banished by time-traveling sorcerer Sise-Neg. The entity eventually returns during the Hyborian Age, but is imprisoned within a mountain by the power of the god Crom. Shuma-Gorath maintains an influence on Earth until Crom returns to its home dimension.

When Shuma-Gorath tries to return to Earth via the mind of the Ancient One, his disciple Doctor Strange is forced to kill him to prevent this. Years later, Strange battles Shuma-Gorath in its home dimension, and although victorious, he gradually becomes a new version of the entity. Strange commits suicide to prevent this transformation and is resurrected by an ally. Nicholas Scratch summons Shuma-Gorath to Earth, but it is driven back by Strange, the Fantastic Four, the Salem's Seven, and Diablo.

Shuma-Gorath is eventually revealed to be one of the four undying extra-dimensional "multi-angled ones" guiding a metaphysical invasion from a dimension called the "cancerverse". After attempting to destroy Death, the entity and its allies are rendered inert by the conceptual form of Death and subsequently are trapped in the cancerverse when it is destroyed. Shuma-Gorath survives and once again attempts to invade Earth, but is repelled by the Avengers with the Spear of Destiny.

During the 2013 "Infinity" storyline, Ebony Maw manipulates Doctor Strange into summoning Shuma-Gorath to New York. The creature is met by Luke Cage and his new team of Avengers. Blue Marvel arrives at the scene of the battle and flies through Shuma-Gorath's head, destroying its physical manifestation. Shuma-Gorath's astral body possesses a crowd of people in New York City and attempts to recreate itself on Earth. It is weakened through mystical attacks by Power Man and White Tiger and banished by Monica Rambeau.

The Last Days of Magic storyline describes Shuma-Gorath as responsible for destroying the home planet of the Imperator, leader of the Empirikul, by sending a group of evil sorcerers after his family. This leads the Imperator to dedicate his life to destroying magic in every universe.

Later, during a battle, Dormammu states to Doctor Strange that he helped the Empirikul in finding Shuma-Gorath, who was defeated by the Imperator. Strange later banishes Dormammu to Shuma-Gorath itself, who was visibly wounded and seeking revenge.

In Steve Orlando's The Vision and the Scarlet Witch (2025), Shuma-Gorath—referred to as Gargantos—is revealed to be the Great Old One behind the Grim Reaper's latest resurrection and new powers. When the Scarlet Witch and Vision defeat the Grim Reaper, Gargantos fights them and is badly wounded, last seen being attacked and dragged away by other Great Old Ones.

== Powers and abilities ==
Shuma-Gorath is a godlike ruler of nearly a hundred alternate universes. The character has the power to destroy galaxies and realities. The entity is described as immortal. Shuma-Gorath is able to manipulate reality. It can communicate with and control life forms across dimensions. It can shoot powerful energy blasts from its eye or tentacles. The entity is capable of teleportation. It also possesses the ability to shape-shift. Shuma-Gorath can also levitate.

== Reception ==
=== Critical response ===
Peter Cunis of CBR.com called Shuma-Gorath one of Doctor Strange's "most popular villains." Jonah Schuhart of Looper asserted, "Shuma-Gorath remains one of Marvel's most interesting antagonists, and a fine example of how Marvel's writers have been able to integrate a variety of influences into one universe." Johnny Brayson and Nola Pfau of Bustle included Shuma-Gorath in their "50 Most Powerful Characters In The Marvel Universe" list, and called it Doctor Strange's "greatest and most dangerous foe." Marc Buxton of Den of Geek included Shuma-Gorath in their "Doctor Strange 2: Characters We Want to See" list. Rosie Knight of Nerdist included Shuma-Gorath in their "8 Magic Characters We Want to See Come to the MCU" list. Chris Heasman of Looper ranked Shuma-Gorath 2nd in their "Doctor Strange's Most Powerful Villains" list. Trey Pasch of MovieWeb ranked Shuma-Gorath 3rd in their "Doctor Strange: His Best Comic Book Villains" list. Jamie Lovett of ComicBook.com ranked Shuma-Gorath 4th in their "5 Greatest Doctor Strange Villains" list. Aparna Ukil of Sportskeeda ranked Shuma-Gorath 7th in their "10 Best Kaijus from Marvel and DC Comics" list.

Screen Rant included Shuma-Gorath in their "15 Most Powerful Magical Beings In Marvel Comics" list, in their "15 Most Powerful Doctor Strange Villains" list, in their "Scarlet Witch's 15 Most Powerful Enemies" list, and in their "10 Best Doctor Strange Comics Characters Not In The MCU" list. CBR.com ranked Shuma-Gorath 1st in their "11 Strongest Doctor Strange Villains" list, 2nd in their "10 Most Powerful Demonic Marvel Villains" list, and 3rd in their "20 Most Villainous Gods In The Marvel Universe" list.

== Other versions ==
A "Poison" Shuma-Gorath makes a minor appearance in Venomized.

== In other media ==
=== Film ===
A creature based on Shuma-Gorath appears in Doctor Strange in the Multiverse of Madness, but due to the legal issues with Funcom this version was renamed "Gargantos" (borrowing the name of a different one-eyed green octopus monster featured in 1969's Sub-Mariner #13). This version was created by Wanda Maximoff to capture America Chavez before it is killed by Doctor Strange.

=== Video games ===
- Shuma-Gorath appears as a playable character in Marvel Super Heroes, voiced by Frank Perry.
- Shuma-Gorath appears as a playable character in Marvel Super Heroes vs. Street Fighter, voiced again by Frank Perry.
- Shuma-Gorath appears as a playable character in Marvel vs. Capcom 2: New Age of Heroes, voiced again by Frank Perry.
- Shuma-Gorath appears as a non-playable character in Pinball FX 2.
- Shuma-Gorath appears as a playable character in Marvel vs. Capcom 3: Fate of Two Worlds, voiced by Paul Dobson.
- Shuma-Gorath appears as a playable character in Ultimate Marvel vs. Capcom 3, voiced again by Paul Dobson.
- The film incarnation of Gargantos appears in Marvel Puzzle Quest.
- Shuma-Gorath appears in a cameo in Marvel Cosmic Invasion, shown imprisoned on Lady Hellbender's ship, the Destromundo.
- Shuma-Gorath—referred to as Gargantos—appears in a cameo in the fighting game Marvel Tokon: Fighting Souls, appearing in the background of a stage set in Hell's Kitchen atop the Nelson & Murdock law office building.

=== Merchandise ===
In 2022, Lego released a Gargantos Lego minifigure inspired by the film incarnation.

On May 29, 2025, Hasbro announced a Marvel Legends Series Gamerverse Shuma-Gorath action figure based on the character's appearances in the Marvel vs. Capcom games. As with the movie character, licensing issues meant that this figure also had to be renamed "Gargantos."

== See also ==
- Shub-Niggurath
