= Secret Wars (toy line) =

1984-1985 Mattel toy line

Marvel Super Heroes Secret Wars
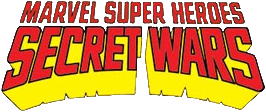
- Type: Action figures
- Invented by: Marvel Comics
- Company: Mattel
- Country: United States
- Availability: 1984–85
- Materials: Plastic
- Features: Marvel Universe

Marvel Super Heroes Secret Wars was a line of action figures and playsets, launched as a tie-in between Marvel Comics and the Mattel toy company. It was released in 1984 and discontinued in 1985.

The line was a reaction to DC Comics' 1984 deal with Kenner Products for the Super Powers Collection. Mattel, concerned about losing the DC account to Kenner, made a similar deal with Marvel. Mattel's request was that the line would be supported with an event comic book that included the words "secret" and "wars", which Mattel's market research found worked particularly well with children in focus groups.

Marvel editor-in-chief Jim Shooter came up with the concept for a year-long twelve-issue crossover called Secret Wars, in which Marvel's most popular heroes and villains would be plucked out of their daily lives to a distant galaxy, where they would be given alien weapons and technology and forced to fight each other.

Some of Mattel's choices for the toy line impacted the look and direction of Marvel's superhero characters. Shooter introduced the idea of a new, black costume for Spider-Man, which was not intended to last for long, but Mattel was very enthusiastic, because it allowed them to sell two versions of the same toy. The "alien costume" was revealed in The Amazing Spider-Man to be a living creature, who separated from Spider-Man to become a new character, Venom.

At Mattel's request, Marvel designed updated, "high-tech" costumes for Iron Man and Doctor Doom. Mattel also requested new female characters, and Marvel introduced two villains, Titania and Volcana, as well as a new version of Spider-Woman, Julia Carpenter. None of the three female characters was produced as part of the toy line. In fact, while dozens of characters were involved in the comic miniseries, Mattel's initial Secret Wars series only included eight characters: four heroes (Spider-Man, Iron Man, Captain America and Wolverine) and four villains (Doctor Doom, Doctor Octopus, Kang the Conqueror and Magneto). The toy line featured several vehicles, as well as figures in the later series, that never featured in the mini-series.

The line included two series of action figures, along with vehicles and playsets, as well as a third series of figures released outside North America.

== Figures ==
Figures were 4 1/2 inches (110 mm) tall. They came packaged in a bubble-card pack. The back of the packaging card came with a character illustration and biography, a short 4-panel comic, and a depiction of available figures in the series.

They each came with a large plastic "Secret Shield" accessory that held a lenticular image. Heroes carried circular red shields and villains carried square gray shields, which were supposed to represent a sort of video communicator. The lenticular "secret identity" image was viewable through a clear plastic window in the top cover of the shield and shifted between showing either the character's costumed or secret identities. There was also a packet of four lenticular "secret message" cartoon inserts that came with each character that fit in the Secret Shield.

=== Series 1 ===
The back of the packaging card had a character illustration and biography, a 4-panel comic of the character in action, and pictures of all eight Series 1 figures.

- Captain America – Captain America only came with a Secret Shield accessory rather than his iconic shield. His Secret Shield "secret identity" insert showed Captain America's face over the same concentric red, white, and blue-circle-inset-with-a-white-star ring pattern.
- Doctor Doom – Comes with both a laser pistol and a laser rifle. The rifle fit in a socket in the back of the torso and the pistol could be attached to a green plastic holder on Doom's upper right leg.
- Doctor Octopus – Comes with Doc Ock's signature silver plastic tentacles. The tentacles were fragile and broke off easily, so an unpackaged figure with intact tentacles is rare.
- Iron Man (James "Rhodey" Rhodes) – Comes with a laser pistol weapon. The character piloting the Iron Man suit in the mini-series and the short biography on the back of the packaging was listed as James "Rhodey" Rhodes. However, Iron Man's lenticular "secret identity" insert depicted Tony Stark instead.
- Kang the Conqueror – Comes with a purple harness and a laser pistol weapon.
- Magneto – Comes with a laser pistol weapon.
- Spider-Man (classic red-and-blue costume)
- Wolverine – Comes with clip-on silver plastic claws. The variant version had clip-on black plastic claws because of complaints that Wolverine's razor-sharp claws looked like knives.

=== Series 2 ===
Poor sales of Series 1 cut back the North American release of this series to just five figures rather than eight. The remaining three were only released overseas. The back of the packaging card had the same character illustration, biography and 4-panel comic like the Series 1 figures but instead had pictures of Captain America, Doctor Doom, and Doctor Octopus from Series 1 and all five figures from Series 2. Except for black suit Spider-Man, none of the characters was featured in the 1984 original mini-series, but appeared in the 40th anniversary mini-series Marvel Super Heroes Secret Wars: Battleworld.

- Baron Zemo II (Helmut Zemo) – Comes with a yellow belt and a black laser pistol.
- Daredevil – Comes with a silver billy club.
- Falcon – Comes with a perched brown Redwing figure accessory and adjustable red plastic wings.
- Hobgoblin – Comes with a 3-piece purple glider.
- Spider-Man (new black costume)

=== Foreign releases ===
These were originally planned to be part of Series 2 but were instead dumped in overseas markets. Packaging was in Spanish language text. None of the characters was featured in the original 1984 mini-series, but appeared in the 40th anniversary mini-series Marvel Super Heroes Secret Wars: Battleworld.

- Constrictor – Comes with a silver plastic constrictor cable (rather than two). It doesn't attach to the wrist like the villain's do in the comics but is held in the right hand.
- Electro
- Iceman – Made of opaque white plastic. Only the eyes and belt-buckle are detailed.

=== 2 and 3 Packs ===
- Captain America vs Doctor Doom – Came with both Series 1 figures and their accessories in a bubble-card pack. Only has Captain America's bio information on the back of the card.
- Super Heroes 3-pack – Came with Series 1 heroes Captain America, Spider-Man, and Iron Man in a bubble-card pack.
- Super Villains 3-pack – Came with Series 1 villains Doctor Doom, Magneto, and Kang in a bubble-card pack.
- Hero Gift Set – Came with heroes Daredevil, Spider-Man (black costume), and Captain America in a large window box. The back of the box has biographical information on all three characters and pictures of the Freedom Fighter Base playset, the Captain America and Doctor Doom figures from Series 1, the Falcon and Hobgoblin figures from Series 2, and all three foreign release figures. Might have been a move to sell off less prominent Series 2 hero figures by bundling them with a more popular Series 1 hero figure.
- Hobgoblin & Baron Zemo – Contains both Series 2 villains. Came in a tan corrugated cardboard mailer box with a direct-printed black-text label and contents were packed in sealed plastic baggies. Might have been a direct Mattel mail-in or special offer exclusive, as it doesn't resemble the Sears boxes.

=== Sears Boxed 2 Packs ===
Available through Sears' 1984 Wish Book Catalog. Came in white pasteboard mailer boxes with direct-printed black-text labels. Contents were packed in sealed plastic bags.

- Wolverine vs Kang (Mattel #9051)
- Spider-Man vs Dr. Octopus (Mattel #9052)
- Iron Man vs Magneto (Mattel #9152)

== Playsets ==
- Marvel Super Heroes Freedom Fighter Playset - A rotating tripod structure with a sensor pod, a laser gun pod, and a landing pad platform.
- Marvel Super Villains Tower of Doom Playset - A building with a rotating laser gun turret on top of a bunker, an elevator platform along the side, a sliding control panel, a trap door leading to a prison cell, and a seat on a sliding arm along the back side.

== Vehicles ==
Each vehicle came with extra "secret message" lenticular inserts for use with the characters' Secret Shields. They displayed the vehicle in action to inspire extended play ideas.

=== Motorcycles ===
A racing motorcycle with a sidecar pod and a stabilizer tailfin between them with an air intake on top. The fairing on the front of the motorcycle and the cockpit over the sidecar both opened to allow the figures to be seated. There were plastic lasers on each side of the front wheel that reciprocated when the cycle rolled forward. A secret compartment for stowing a Secret Shield was behind the seat in the sidecar. They were identical designs remolded in different-colored plastic.

- Turbo Cycle - A blue over white fuselage, translucent blue windshield and cockpit, and red plastic sidecar seat, air intake, and lasers. It was detailed with a large "TURBO" sticker on the left side of the sidecar and a red, white, and blue Captain America shield sticker on the nose of the pod. The limited Series 2 version came with a Captain America figure.
- Doom Cycle - A black fuselage, translucent purple windshield and cockpit, and gray plastic sidecar seat, air intake, and lasers. It was detailed with hot-rod flame stickers and a stylized "M" for Magneto sticker on the nose of the pod. The limited Series 2 version came with a Doctor Doom figure.

=== Helicopters ===
A toy helicopter that could seat 3 figures that was in a cramped 1:16 scale. It was repurposed from a design for 4-inch figures, so it was difficult to get the 4.5-inch figures in and out without scraping them. There were stub wings on the sides that held black plastic missiles (three on each side), a flexible side-firing black plastic minigun at the co-pilot's position, a black plastic Vulcan cannon mounted on the right side of the nose and a black plastic radar mast mounted on the left side of the nose on slide-on brackets, and two forward-facing black plastic machineguns mounted in fairings under the nose. There was a partition in the back of the passenger compartment that could be opened and used to store a Secret Shield. It not only came with new "secret message" inserts but also an extra Secret Shield.

- Turbo Copter - A blue helicopter with red, white, and blue stickers. It was detailed with a sticker of Captain America's shield on the nose. The limited Series 2 version came with Captain America included.
- Doom Copter - A green helicopter that had light green and silver stickers. It was detailed with a sticker of Doctor Doom's mask on the nose. The limited Series 2 version came with Doctor Doom included.

=== Gliders ===
A three-part glider toy. It had a plastic fuselage with a rubber nosecone and two white foam-rubber wings that fastened into the fuselage with snap clamps. The wings had to be covered with large sectional stickers with patterns on them that were difficult to apply evenly. Although it came with an action figure, there was no seat, harness, or cockpit to secure it and it would often fall off or unbalance the glider.

- Star Dart Glider - A glider with a silver plastic fuselage with a red rubber nosecone. The white foam-rubber wings were covered with white stickers accented with blue and red markings. It came with a Black Costume Spider-Man action figure.
- Doom Star Glider - A glider with a black plastic fuselage with a purple rubber nosecone. The white foam-rubber wings were covered with black stickers accented with purple and red markings. It came with a Kang action figure.

=== Roller ===
- Doom Roller - A battery-powered mono-wheel two-seat car that was part of Series 1. The wheel looked like a loop of railroad track with cogged outer rims and the vehicle pod rode on the interior of the track to propel it forwards. There was a secret compartment behind the seats that could hold a Secret Shield. The packaging had depictions of all eight Series 1 figures.

== See also ==
- Super Powers Collection – A similar line put out by Kenner for DC Comics characters
