= Steven Grant =

American comic book writer (born 1953)

- Born: October 22, 1953 (age 73) Madison, Wisconsin, U.S.
- Area: Writer
- Notable works: The Punisher

Steven Grant (born October 22, 1953) is an American comic book writer best known for his work with Trouser Press, his 1985–1986 Marvel Comics mini-series The Punisher with artist Mike Zeck, and for his creator-owned character Whisper.

== Biography ==
=== Comic books ===
Grant has written for both major publishers such as Marvel Comics and DC Comics, as well as smaller companies including First Comics and Dark Horse Comics.

Beginning in the 1980s, Grant wrote a number of works for Marvel. In addition to bringing the Punisher back into the forefront of the Marvel Universe after a several-year lull, Grant has written The Avengers and fill-in issues on comics such as The Incredible Hulk, Marvel Team-Up, The Spectacular Spider-Man, What If?, and Moon Knight . Coincidentally one of Moon Knight's secret identities is named Steven Grant.

Grant wrote a conclusion to Steve Gerber's Omega the Unknown series in two issues of The Defenders at the end of which most of the original series' characters were killed. While Gerber seemed unhappy with Grant's conclusion, it nevertheless tied up the loose ends of the comic series. In 1982, Grant, Mark Gruenwald, and Bill Mantlo co-wrote Marvel Super Hero Contest of Champions, the first limited series published by Marvel Comics. Grant and artist Mike Zeck produced a Punisher limited series in 1986 and an original hardcover graphic novel of the character three years later.

Grant's creator-owned character, the female ninja Whisper, debuted at Capital Comics in 1983, though the company's publishing arm folded after only two issues and a promotional poster of the series were published. Several months after First Comics picked up two other Capital publications (Nexus and the Badger), they published a one-shot entitled Whisper Special which led to Whisper being featured in the anthology series First Adventures and eventually to her own ongoing series in June 1986. During this time, Grant wrote American Flagg! (he was personally selected by Howard Chaykin to take over scripting the title after Chaykin's departure), a fill-in run on Shatter, a short-lived comic book of his own creation called Psychoblast and a few issues of Classics Illustrated at First.

At Dark Horse Comics, Grant wrote several limited and ongoing series in the short-lived Dark Horse shared superhero continuity, including the entire two-year run of the series X. His creation Enemy, published by Dark Horse, was optioned and produced as a Fox pilot, but ultimately did not air. He wrote numerous stories for DC Comics in the 1990s and created new versions of Manhunter and the Challengers of the Unknown. He continued to periodically write for Marvel Comics, his last major contribution being X-Man in collaboration with Warren Ellis and Ariel Olivetti. Among his other creator-owned works of the 1990s were the superhero comic Edge, with Gil Kane, published by Malibu Comics/Bravura, and the crime series Damned with Mike Zeck, published by WildStorm.

His two long-running columns exposing the inner workings of the comics industry, "Master of the Obvious" and "Permanent Damage", ran from 1999–2010 at the Comic Book Resources website.

Since 2005, Grant has written several works for IDW Publishing including original comics featuring the characters from the television show CSI. He wrote a one-shot featuring an updated version of his character Whisper and created a crime series, 2 Guns, about undercover cops, for Boom! Studios. At Avatar Press, he produced two creator-owned mini-series, Mortal Souls and My Flesh Is Cool, as well as adapted Frank Miller's original Robocop screenplays to comics format, which deviated considerably from the filmed versions.

=== Novels ===
In addition to comic book work, Grant has written a number of Hardy Boys novels for young adults under the pen-name Franklin W. Dixon, as well as Tom Swift and various "choose-your-own-adventure" type books, a posthumous collaboration with science fiction writer Isaac Asimov.

=== Film ===
Grant's 2 Guns has been made into a motion picture from Universal Studios starring Denzel Washington, Mark Wahlberg, Bill Paxton and Paula Patton.

Grant is working on the sequel to 2 Guns as well as an updating of Gil Kane's spy thriller His Name Is... Savage

== Bibliography ==
- The Hardy Boys Casefiles (under the pen name Franklin W. Dixon)
  - Cult of Crime (1987)
  - The Crowning Terror (1987)
  - Too Many Traitors (1988)
  - Nightmare in Angel City (1988)
  - Thick as Thieves (1989)
  - Final Gambit (1992)
- Badlands (with Vince Giarrano, five-issue mini-series, Dark Horse Comics, May 1993; tpb, 2006, ISBN 1-878574-53-1)
- Alien³ #1–3 Dark Horse Comics, June – July 1992
- RoboCop 3 #1–3 Dark Horse Comics, July – November 1993
- Frank Miller's RoboCop #1–9 Avatar Press, July 2003 – January 2006
- RoboCop: Killing Machine Avatar Press, August 2004
- RoboCop: Wild Child Avatar Press, January 2005
- CSI: Crime Scene Investigation:
  - Secret Identity (with Steven Perkins and Gabriel Rodriguez, five-issue mini-series, tpb, 2005, IDW Publishing, ISBN 1-933239-40-9)
  - Dying in the Gutters (with Stephen Mooney, five-issue mini-series, 2006, tpb, IDW Publishing, March 2007, ISBN 1-60010-048-1)
- 2 Guns (with Mateus Santolouco, five-issue mini-series, 2007, Boom! Studios)
- The Safest Place (with co-author Victor Riches and art by Tom Mandrake, Image Comics, 2008)

Preceded by Roger Stern	The Incredible Hulk writer 1980	Succeeded by Bill Mantlo
Preceded by Jim Shooter	The Avengers writer 1982	Succeeded by Roger Stern
Preceded by n/a	The Punisher writer 1986	Succeeded by Mike Baron
Preceded by Dan Abnett and Andy Lanning	The Punisher writer 1993–1994	Succeeded by Chuck Dixon
Preceded by J. M. DeMatteis	The Spectacular Spider-Man writer 1993–1994	Succeeded by Mike Lackey
