= Contest of Chaos =

Comic book storyline

- Publisher: Marvel Comics
- Publication date: August – September 2023
- Main character(s): Agatha Harkness; Scarlet Witch; Spider-Man; Wolverine; Iron Man; Storm; Human Torch; Ghost Rider; Moon Knight; Taegukgi; Ghost-Spider; White Fox; Venom; Deadpool; Cyclops; Captain Marvel; Captain America; Black Panther; Thor; Vision; Jessica Jones; Clea

Creative team
- Writers: Stephanie Phillips; Jason Loo; Zac Gorman; Karla Pacheco; Jed MacKay; Alyssa Wong; Paul Allor
- Pencillers: Alberto Foche; David Cutler; Alan Robinson; Creees Lee; Rosi Kämpe; Sergio Fernandez Davila; Alessandro Miracolo

"Contest of Chaos" is an American comic book crossover storyline written by Stephanie Phillips with art by Alberto Foche, David Cutler, and Alan Robinson, published in 2023 by Marvel Comics. The story involves Agatha Harkness acquiring the Darkhold and corrupting superheroes to fight each other. The event received mixed to negative reviews from critics with criticism toward the story and the repetitive use of heroes fighting each other.

== Publication history ==
On March 2, 2023, Marvel announced the event Contest of Chaos which will have Agatha Harkness go into conflict with Scarlet Witch and set off a magical challenge where the heroes will be corrupted into fighting each other.

== Plot ==
Spider-Man defeats the Rhino in New York City but is transported to a magical city in the Amazon rainforest due to Agatha Harkness' spell. Agatha uses Chthon's remains to create a new Darkhold and immobilizes it. Spider-Man encounters Wolverine, who was also transported, and they encounter a purple orb that corrupts them. Spider-Man and Wolverine fight with Wolverine winning due to Spider-Man holding back. Wolverine uses the orb to disappear and gives Agatha the orb while Spider-Man is transported back to New York City. Spider-Man meets up with Jessica Jones to find out what has been happening.

Storm and Iron Man meet up in Mexico due to them hearing voices in their heads leading them to there. They go into Giant Crystal Cave where they are tricked by the crystals into fighting each other. Storm manages to depower Iron Man by shooting at his chest piece when he lets his guard down, but Iron Man shoots a missile destroying the crystals. However, this causes the crystals to use their effect more ending with Storm defeating Iron Man. However, she is taken away by mysterious purple clouds while Iron Man calls Captain Marvel to inform her of the recent events. Meanwhile, Spider-Man realizes that there are a lot of magic users that could be causing the heroes to fight each other, but struggles with narrowing one down. Jones reads about Iron Man and Storm's fight in Mexico, and goes with Spider-Man to meet with Clea Strange to find out what is happening.

Human Torch and Thing are cleaning up a shoe store in Arizona when Human Torch is transported to Hell where he meets Ghost Rider, who was also transported there. Ghost Rider attacks Human Torch, falsely blaming him for trapping them there, but they put aside their differences to fend off demons. Human Torch and Ghost Rider resume fighting as "Hell" is revealed to be an illusion and the two are transported onto a moving train in the American Midwest. The Torch defeats the Rider by knocking off the train with his own chain and just as the train stops in Chicago, Agatha captures Human Torch and locks him up. Clea explains to Spider-Man and Jessica Jones that her sisters tried to capture Chaos to control its destructive potential, and transports the three to Chaos itself.

Moon Knight is in New Jersey hunting the Jersey Devil but encounters Taegukgi who is on a similar mission. Both of them meet up in an area with purple Etsium crystals imbued with Chaos energy, which causes them to fight each other. They take alternate reality forms of themselves due to the Etsium crystals and keep on fighting each other, with Moon Knight surrendering the fight, and Taegukgi touching the purple crystals. Agatha travels to the Bermuda Triangle but is attacked by demons who are angry she created a new Darkhold. Agatha manages to ward off the demons by summoning Wolverine, Human Torch, Taegukgi, and Storm to aid her.

Ghost-Spider is trapped in a medieval fantasy world where she is a knight fighting off an invasion led by White Fox. While fighting, White Fox realizes that the "dream" is actually a haikyo, and when several animatronics steal an orb that Ghost-Spider was supposed to protect, the two team up to recover the orb. They walk into a tunnel where they enter a room where the orb forces them to fight each other while threatening their loved ones. White Fox defeats Ghost-Spider and is taken by the orb, with Ghost-Spider promising to save her. Spider-Man, Jessica Jones, and Clea teleport to the area where Spider-Man and Wolverine previously fought, where Clea explains the reason why the heroes are fighting recently is because someone is using the Chaos magic to manipulate the heroes. Clea tries using her spell to find out who, but is knocked out and meets Agatha's spirit in the astral plane.

Deadpool is walking his symbiote dog Princess in New York City when he is magically transported to Hopper Land, an amusement park in the United Kingdom. The Venom symbiote and its current host Dylan Brock are also transported to Hopper Land, interrupting their search for Venom's previous host and Dylan's father Eddie. One of Agatha's familiars offers Venom and Deadpool an opportunity to compete for a mystical Limited Edition Hopper made up of pure Chaos energy that could alter reality, as well as lifetime tickets for Hopper Land. Venom and Deadpool engage in a bloody and vicious duel for the prize with Venom ultimately winning. Agatha appears and captures Venom and Dylan while Deadpool is sent back to his apartment. Clea and Agatha briefly engage in the astral plane and Agatha's sprit is knocked back into her physical body in the Bermuda Triangle, where she meets her summoned champions, which now include White Fox and Venom.

Cyclops awakens in a seemingly abandoned town in Iceland and encounters Captain Marvel, who is also unclear on how she ended there. The two are prevented from leaving by a force field created by Chaos magic surrounding the town and egged on by the energies radiating from the Chaos, begin acting irrational and aggressive towards each other. Realizing that a fish imbued with Chaos energy will allow one of them to escape, Cyclops and Captain Marvel fight each other. Captain Marvel absorbs a large amount of Cyclops' optic energy; Cyclops warns her that her acquired energy will potentially kill him and civilians if they continue to fight. Captain Marvel surrenders and collapses from the energy overload, allowing Cyclops to claim the fish. Cyclops becomes magically possessed and transported to Agatha while Captain Marvel is transported away. Meanwhile, Clea realizes that Agatha's plan to create a new Darkhold involves using Chaos energy generated from her possessed Champions, which would result in worse outcome if it fails. Clea and Jones track Agatha's location in the Bermuda Triangle as Spider-Man contacts the Avengers (Scarlet Witch, Iron Man, Captain Marvel, Captain America, Black Panther, Thor, and Vision).

The Avengers try to go meet Agatha, but they are attacked by Agatha's possessed heroes. Scarlet Witch is nearly killed by Cyclops, but Captain Marvel saves her. Spider-Man, Jessica Jones, and Clea arrive. Captain Marvel realizes that Agatha is trying to create a new Darkhold as she and Wanda meet Agatha. Wanda and Captain Marvel try to appease and calm down Agatha, but it does not work. During the chaos, Agatha drops the Darkhold and Carol Danvers picks it up which causes a huge explosion. When the dust settles, the possessed heroes are free and Agatha is missing while the rest of the heroes escape and relax on a beach. Agatha wakes up on a beach and realizes that her new Darkhold has taken on a sentient form and is slowly gaining power.

== Reading order ==
- Scarlet Witch Annual #1
- Spider-Man Annual (Volume 4) #1
- Iron Man Annual (Volume 4) #1
- Fantastic Four Annual (Volume 3) #1
- Moon Knight Annual (Volume 4) #1
- Spider-Gwen Annual (Volume 2) #1
- Venom Annual (Volume 3) #1
- X-Men Annual (Volume 5) #1
- Avengers Annual (Volume 5) #1

== Critical reception ==
According to Comicbook Roundup, Scarlet Witch Annual #1 received an average rating of 8.8 out of 10 based on 6 reviews.

According to Comicbook Roundup, Spider-Man Annual #1 received an average rating of 5.8 out of 10 based on 5 reviews.

According to Comicbook Roundup, Invincible Iron Man Annual #1 received an average rating of 5.7 out of 10 based on 2 reviews.

According to Comicbook Roundup, Fantastic Four Annual #1 received an average rating of 6 out of 10 based on 1 review.

According to Comicbook Roundup, Moon Knight Annual 2023 received an average rating of 6.9 out of 10 based on 3 reviews.

According to Comicbook Roundup, Venom Annual #1 received an average rating of 8 out of 10 based on 1 review.

According to Comicbook Roundup, X-Men Annual 2023 received an average rating of 3 out of 10 based on 1 review.

According to Comicbook Roundup, Avengers Annual 2023 received an average rating of 6 out of 10 based on 1 review.
