= John Beatty (illustrator) =

American Comic Artist

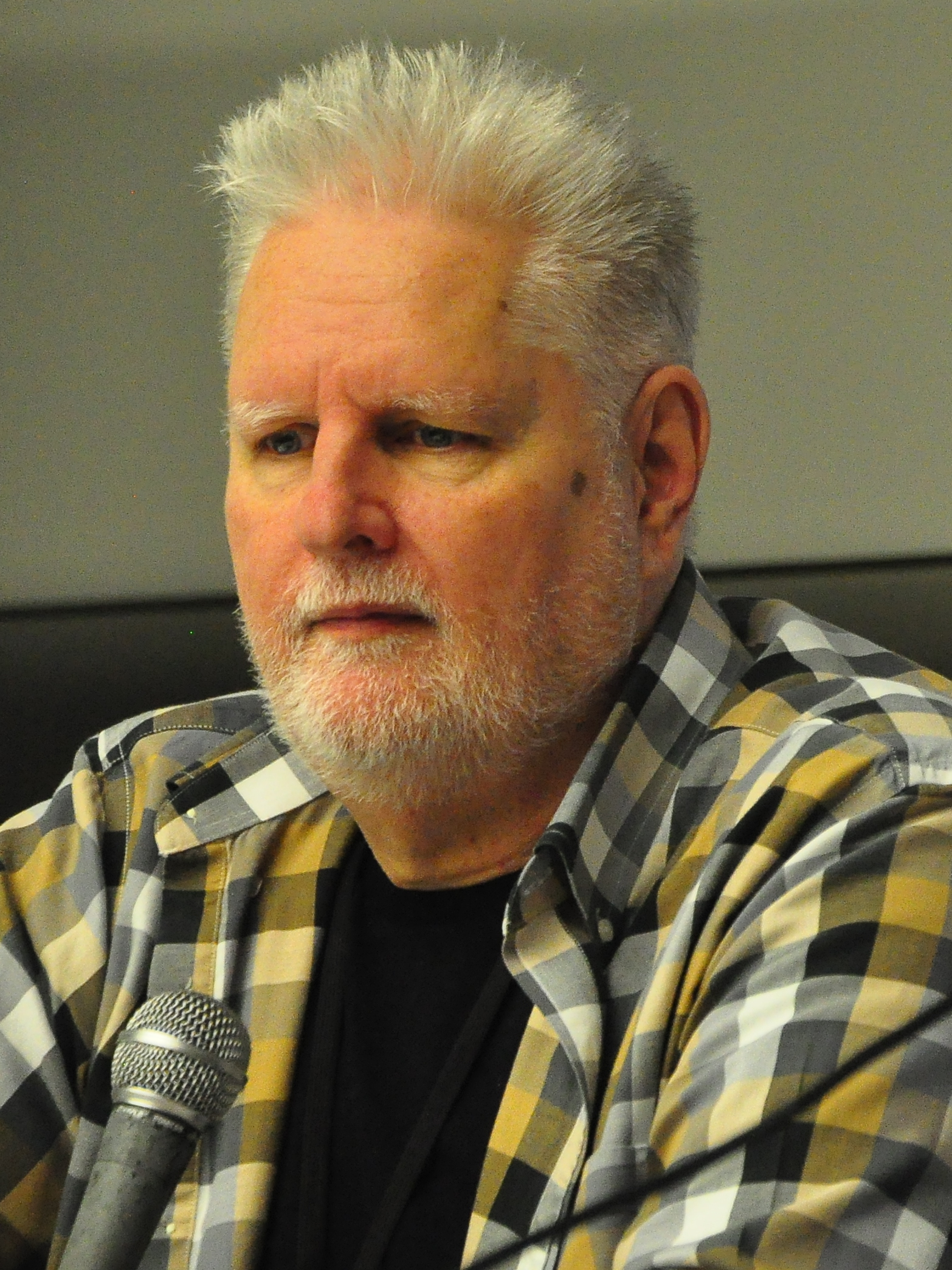
- Beatty at GalaxyCon Richmond in 2024
- Born: May 6, 1961 (age 65) Whitesburg, Kentucky
- Area: Inker
- Children: Jacob Beatty

John R. Beatty (born May 6, 1961, in Whitesburg, Kentucky) is an American illustrator who has worked for Marvel Comics and DC Comics, primarily as an inker.

== Biography ==
Beatty was born in Letcher County, Kentucky; he lived there for less than a year when his family moved to Holly Hill, Florida, a small city located between Daytona Beach and Ormond Beach.

As a child, I discovered and fell in love with the comic strips Dennis the Menace and Peanuts. It wasn't until later that Beatty discovered superhero comic books when a friend who lived up the street sold him a box of comics for $20.00. Beatty's goal was to become a comic book artist.

By the time he was 15 years old, Beatty had made his first "professional sell," as Camelot Publishing hired him to do cartoons for computer instruction manuals. This gig turned into after-school employment during Beatty's high school years. He graduated from Mainland Senior High School in 1979.

Not long after he discovered the world of fanzines, Beatty wrote and drew a short comic story starring the hero "Crime Smasher," which was printed in Tim Corrigan's Super Hero Comics. Jerry Ordway had a story published in the same issue, and Ordway was also starting up his self-published comic book, titled OK Comics! Soon Beatty and Ordway began communicating through the mail. Beatty also connected with artist Mike Zeck, through the "pro-zine" Rocket's Blast Comicollector. Zeck encouraged Beatty, and even sent xeroxed pencils of his work to Beatty, so he could ink samples for practice and critiques.

Beatty had, for a couple of years, been going to OrlandoCon, an annual comic book convention held in Orlando, Florida. Beatty and his long-time friend Craig Zablo (creator of Stallonezone, a Sylvester Stallone fansite), would go to OrlandoCon and make a weekend of it. On this particular occasion, Beatty took some art samples to show professional attendees, comics artists such as Pat Broderick and Bob McLeod (who were living on the west coast of Florida in Tampa). This was also the con where Beatty met AC Comics publisher and artist Bill Black. Beatty showed samples to Black and was offered ink work on the spot; he would get to ink Black's pencils at a rate of $7.00 per page.

Beatty's career began to take shape: Bob McLeod tagged him to start doing some assistant work, such as filling in blacks and erasing pages; he also occasionally drew backgrounds for McLeod's pages.

It was now 1980. Beatty went to the annual MiamiCon and showed Marvel Comics' editor-in-chief Jim Shooter new samples of his work. (Shooter had reviewed Beatty's work the previous year and said Beatty was not quite ready.) Shooter looked over Beatty's art and said: "If you can come up to New York, I'll give you a paid tryout to work on." In July 1980, Beatty made the journey, and with the help of Mike Zeck got some gigs from both Marvel and DC.

Beatty spent twenty years inking titles such as Captain America, The Punisher, Secret Wars, The Nam, The Adventures of Superman, Batman, JLA, and many more.

Beatty has also worked for the DC Comics Licensing Department, where style guide art is created. This art is used for many things, including package design, clothing, and other licensed products that DC supplies its vendors.

== Bibliography ==
Comics work includes:

- New Mutants vol. 1 #50 (inker)
- Captain America vol. 1 #265, 267–283, 286–289, 321–323, 326, 327 vol.3 #5
- Secret Wars # 1–12
- Punisher # 1–5
- Venom: The Madness (1993–1994)
