= Molecule Man =

Fictional character

Publication information
- Publisher: Marvel Comics
- First appearance: Fantastic Four #20 (November 1963)
- Created by: Stan Lee (writer); Jack Kirby (artist)

In-story information
- Alter ego: Owen Reece
- Species: Human mutate
- Partnerships: Volcana (formerly)
- Abilities: Nigh-omnipotence; Wand proficiency

The Molecule Man (Owen Reece) is a character appearing in American comic books published by Marvel Comics. He first appeared in Fantastic Four #20 in November 1963 and was created by Stan Lee and Jack Kirby. An enormously powerful entity, he is often portrayed as a supervillain, but sometimes takes the role of a reformed outlaw or reluctant hero.

== Publication history ==
Molecule Man first appeared in Fantastic Four #20 (November 1963) and was created by writer Stan Lee and artist Jack Kirby. Initially introduced as a recurring antagonist for the superhero team, the character's origins were deeply tied to the atomic-age anxieties prevalent in early 1960s Marvel Comics. Following his debut, the character made sporadic appearances throughout the 1970s, primarily serving as a cosmic-level threat in titles such as The Avengers and Iron Man. His role shifted significantly in the mid-1980s during the original Secret Wars (1984–1985) limited series written by Jim Shooter, where his vast reality-warping capabilities and psychological vulnerabilities were explored in greater depth, transitioning him into a more nuanced, tragic anti-hero. Molecule Man became a central narrative linchpin decades later in the lead-up to and during the 2015 Secret Wars storyline written by Jonathan Hickman. In this event, his multiversal nature was redefined, positioning him as a living bomb engineered by the Beyonders to destroy the Marvel Multiverse, and later as the foundational power source used by Doctor Doom to create Battleworld. Following the conclusion of the event, the character was instrumental in the rebuilding of Earth-616 and the broader multiverse alongside the Fantastic Four.

== Fictional character biography ==
Owen Reece was a timid child from Brooklyn, New York who obsessively clung to his mother. He grew into a weak-willed adult, made bitter and lonely by his mother's death, and full of fear and hatred of what he regarded as an unfriendly world. Reece became a lowly laboratory technician working at a nuclear plant owned by the Acme Atomics Corporation. He was disgruntled by his job's long hours and low pay. One day, Reece accidentally activated an experimental particle generator, which bombarded him with an unknown form of radiation, later revealed to be energy from a dimension containing the Beyonder. The radiation had a mutagenic effect on Reece, releasing his potential for psionic powers on a cosmic scale. Reece could now control all matter, even down to the molecular level, and all energy. The radiation also left markings resembling lightning bolts across Reece's face. Reece named himself the Molecule Man after his power to control molecules.

The day after the accident, the president of Acme Atomics fires Reece for his carelessness. Angered, Molecule Man covered the president and his desk with ice. Reece became a criminal and set out to use his powers to take revenge on a world he believed had belittled and persecuted him. However, Reece's self-doubt, fear, and self-hatred subconsciously restricted his powers. He believed he was unable to affect organic molecules, and that his power resided in a metal wand. The Fantastic Four pretend to be statues by covering themselves with plaster. Molecule Man, due to his self-imposed limitation, is unable to affect the Fantastic Four and drops his wand in shock, allowing Mister Fantastic to grab it. Uatu transports Molecule Man to confinement in an other-dimensional world where time passed at an accelerated rate.

Molecule Man manages to recreate his body and transfer his consciousness into it, freeing himself from the other world. He threatens to destroy Earth, but Tigra persuades him to give himself up and seek psychiatric help. During the events of Secret Wars, Molecule Man is transported to Battleworld, where he falls in love with Volcana. Doctor Doom helps Molecule Man break through his mental blocks and realize that his power was greater than he had believed. After returning to Earth, Molecule Man and Volcana move to Denver, where Molecule Man begins working at a nuclear power atomic plant.

Molecule Man confronts the Beyonder when he arrives on Earth seeking emotional fulfillment. After failing to do so, the Beyonder decides to destroy the multiverse. Molecule Man exhausts himself fighting the Beyonder, who rips open part of Earth's crust. Molecule Man and Silver Surfer combine their powers to repair the Beyonder's damage done to Earth, with Molecule Man pretending to have burned out his powers in the process. Only Volcana and Silver Surfer know that Molecule Man still has his powers.

Doc Samson encounters Molecule Man while searching for the missing Bruce Banner. Owen mistakenly thinks that he is being stalked, and captures Samson to explain himself. After She-Hulk gets involved, they clear up the misunderstanding. He reveals that his relationship with Volcana has hit a road bump, leading to temporary separation that makes him depressed. Samson convinces Molecule Man to display his affection more openly. Molecule Man decides to repair areas destroyed by recent terrorist activity in Volcana's honor, including rebuilding Mount Rushmore with the addition of her own likeness.

A series of disappearances in Dinosaur, Colorado, causes Norman Osborn's Dark Avengers to visit the area. Sentry arrives first and is instantly disintegrated. Owen, isolated from everyone, has lost the ability to differentiate between hallucinations and reality and secluded himself near the area he was born. After the other Avengers are defeated, Victoria Hand convinces Molecule Man to restore everything he destroyed and to stop being a threat, in return for being left alone in the future. Sentry returns and disintegrates Reece's body.

Doctor Doom resurrects and imprisons Molecule Man, intending to use him to stop the Incursions that are destroying universes. The two travel back in time, which restores Molecule Man's mind and causes him to remember that the Beyonders created him and his multiversal counterparts as weapons to destroy the multiverse.

Doom harnesses Molecule Man's powers to kill the Beyonders, absorb their power, and form a new incarnation of Battleworld. After Peter Parker and Miles Morales free Molecule Man, he defeats Doom and gives the power of the Beyonders to Mister Fantastic, who recreates the multiverse with his son Franklin Richards. In the process, Molecule Man regains his sanity and transfers Miles and his family and friends to Earth-616.

== Powers and abilities ==
Owen Reece originally had the ability to psionically manipulate molecules for a variety of effects, such as force field generation, energy blasts, and hyperspace travel. However, he later gained reality-bending capabilities on a multiversal scale. Reece subconsciously imposed mental blocks on himself that prevented him from affecting organic molecules, though he later overcame the blocks. As his power originates from the Beyonders, The Molecule Man is connected to them and can harness their energy.

== In other media ==
=== Television ===
- The Molecule Man appears in a self-titled episode of Fantastic Four, voiced by Henry Corden.
- The Molecule Man appears in The Super Hero Squad Show, voiced by Fred Stoller. This version is Volcana's boyfriend and a member of Doctor Doom's Lethal Legion.
- The Molecule Man makes a non-speaking appearance in the Avengers Assemble episode "Molecule Kid". He fought the Avengers and was disarmed of his wand which later came into the possession of his son Aaron. Aaron comes into conflict with the Avengers before helping them defeat MODOK and the Super-Adaptoid and entering S.H.I.E.L.D. custody.
- The Molecule Man appears in Moon Girl and Devil Dinosaur, voiced by Edward James Olmos. This version is a four-armed alien with control over non-organic matter and a rival of the Beyonder.

=== Video games ===
The Molecule Man appears as a playable character in Marvel Future Fight.
