= Secret Wars =

1984–1985 Marvel Comics limited series

- Marvel Super-Heroes Secret Wars #1 (May 1984). Cover art by Mike Zeck depicting Captain America, Cyclops, Wolverine, Hawkeye, The Wasp, Rogue, She-Hulk, The Thing, Captain Marvel, Colossus, Nightcrawler, Hulk, Spider-Man, Storm, Human Torch and Iron Man

Publication information
- Publisher: Marvel Comics
- Schedule: Monthly
- Format: Limited series
- Publication date: May 1984 – Apr. 1985
- No. of issues: 12
- Main character(s): Avengers; Fantastic Four; X-Men; Spider-Man; Hulk; Magneto; Doctor Doom; Absorbing Man; Doctor Octopus; Enchantress; Kang; Klaw; Lizard; Molecule Man; Ultron; The Wrecking Crew; Galactus; Beyonder

Creative team
- Written by: Jim Shooter
- Penciller(s): Mike Zeck, Bob Layton
- Inker: John Beatty

Marvel Super Heroes Secret Wars, commonly known as Secret Wars, is a 12-issue American comic book crossover limited series published from May 1984 to April 1985 by Marvel Comics. The series was written by Jim Shooter, with art by Mike Zeck, Bob Layton, and John Beatty. It was tied in with a similarly named toy line from Mattel and a role-playing game of the same name from TSR, Inc.

== Publication history ==
The series was conceived by Marvel Comics' editor-in-chief Jim Shooter. The series was announced under the title Cosmic Champions in the eleventh issue of the Marvel Age news magazine, cover dated February 1984. The series was renamed following feedback from Mattel's focus group, which indicated that children responded positively to the words 'wars' and 'secret.' Mattel's involvement influenced the storyline and character design, including making Doctor Doom and Iron Man's armor more high-tech to appeal to kids. They also requested new fortresses, vehicles, and weapons to increase play value and promote playsets. Shooter believed he was the only one capable of writing the series.

Crossover titles include The Amazing Spider-Man #249–252, The Avengers #242–243, Captain America #292, The Incredible Hulk (vol. 2) #294–295, Iron Man #181–183, The Thing #10–22, Fantastic Four #265, Marvel Team-Up #141, The Uncanny X-Men #178–181, and Thor #341. In 1987, Thor #383 was presented as a previously untold tale from Marvel Superheroes Secret Wars.

== Plot ==
=== Premise ===
A cosmic entity, the Beyonder, becomes fascinated with Earth's superheroes in the mainstream Marvel universe. He creates "Battleworld," a planet in a distant galaxy, and stocks it with weapons and technology. He teleports groups of heroes and supervillains against their will to Battleworld, declaring: "I am from beyond! Slay your enemies and all that you desire shall be yours! Nothing you dream of is impossible for me to accomplish!"

=== Combatants ===
The heroes include the Avengers (Captain America, Captain Marvel, Hawkeye, Iron Man, She-Hulk, Thor, the Wasp, and the Hulk), three members of the Fantastic Four (Human Torch, Mister Fantastic and the Thing), solo hero Spider-Man, and the X-Men (Colossus, Cyclops, Nightcrawler, Professor X, Rogue, Storm, Wolverine, and Lockheed the Dragon). Magneto is featured as a hero, but becomes non-aligned when the Avengers question his presence. The villains include the Absorbing Man, Doctor Doom, Doctor Octopus, the Enchantress, Kang the Conqueror, Klaw, the Lizard, the Molecule Man, Titania, Ultron, Volcana, and the Wrecking Crew. The cosmic entity Galactus also appears as a villain who becomes a non-aligned entity.

=== Conflicts ===
The heroes (with the X-Men choosing to remain a separate unit) and villains have several skirmishes. Ultron is drained of energy by Galactus, who then confronts the Beyonder while Doctor Doom observes. Both are defeated and sent crashing down to Battleworld. When everyone else reaches Battleworld, Magneto leaves the heroes feeling rejected and Kang blasts Doom to the heroes' base when he tries to rally the villains. The heroes win the first skirmish, causing the villains to fall back, only to be assaulted by Ultron, having been rebuilt by Doom.

The heroes then attack Magneto, but he captures Wasp and takes her to his fortress where they are trapped by the weather; the X-Men decide to join Magneto. Doom creates villainesses Titania and Volcana, then leads the remaining villains in a successful assault on the heroes and their base, which they bury under a mountain. After Thor and the Enchantress return from elsewhere, Thor vanishes trying to fight the villains. Doom has Ultron kill Kang as payback.

When the X-Men arrive to fight Magneto, they form an alliance but Wasp leaves. The Hulk is revealed to have saved everyone from the mountain. Thor also returns, having hidden his escape with lightning. The heroes find a village brought to Battleworld where Galactus has summoned his ship so he can consume the planet. Everybody fights him. Doom's faction returns and attacks the heroes, while he sneaks onto Galactus' ship and persuades Klaw to join the villains. Professor X has the X-Men fall back and then attack the villains, who are attacking volcanoes set off by Cyclops. Colossus falls in love with an alien healer named Zsaji. Wasp befriends the Lizard but is gravely wounded by the Wrecking Crew before being returned to the heroes. The second Spider-Woman, Julia Carpenter, is introduced.

The cover of Secret Wars #8, which featured the origin of Spider-Man's black costume, art by Mike Zeck

The X-Men win another battle against the villains. Galactus sends Doom back to his base, where he notices the volcanoes and tries to fix the planet. Professor X tells Captain America to fight the villains while they take care of Galactus. Zsaji revives Wasp. In the villain's base, Hulk and Thor show Spider-Man an alien device that they have used to recreate their clothing. Spider-Man finds and wears a black costume. Galactus begins to devour the planet. Mr. Fantastic suggests they let him, so the Beyonder will take away his eternal hunger, but everyone else convinces him against it. Back at the heroes' base, Doctor Doom uses Klaw's body to create a machine that absorbs Galactus' power, even after he absorbs his own ship instead. With his newfound power, Doom steals the Beyonder's power.

Molecule Man brings the villains to Volcana's apartment on Battleworld, then takes the suburb of Denver back to Earth. Doom summons the heroes to his new "Tower of Doom" where he revives Kang, sends him back to his own time, and reveals that Galactus was taken away by Nova. He kills all the heroes with a bolt when they refuse to join him and attack. Zsaji revives them at the cost of her life. They battle Klaw and monsters he created, including Ultron. Doom's powers go out of control, thanks to Klaw convincing him to use them again. While Wasp destroys Ultron, the Beyonder, who had possessed Klaw, takes back his powers and teleports Doom and Klaw away. After Zsaji's funeral, everyone finds out that the energy from the Beyonder that was released has turned Battleworld into a place where wishes are granted. Mr. Fantastic builds a portal that can take everyone home. However, the Thing, having gained the ability to revert to his original human form of Ben Grimm at will, chooses to remain on Battleworld for a year to explore the galaxy.

=== Aftermath ===
The next tie-ins with Secret Wars open right after the return of the combatants. She-Hulk replaces the Thing in the Fantastic Four, Colossus ends his romantic relationship with a heartbroken Kitty Pryde, and the Hulk's leg is injured by Ultron.

== Reception ==
Secret Wars was a best-seller when it was published in 1984, selling more copies than any other comic in the previous 25 years. While it was a financial success, it was not well received by critics when it was published, being criticized for its uninspired and juvenile content. An announcement of a sequel series, Secret Wars II, from Carol Kalish, Marvel's Direct Sales Manager at the time, was first met with boos. Kalish was even quoted saying: "Let's be honest. Secret Wars was crap, right? But did it sell?"

In 2011, IGN listed Secret Wars as one of the best comic book events. Their writers found the action and goofiness of the story to be enjoyable. They also highlighted the effect it had on the Marvel Universe by introducing the symbiote and new characters. In 2011, Alex Zalben of MTV News ranked Secret Wars as the second biggest comic event ever, after only DC Comics' Crisis on Infinite Earths event. Zalben praised the Secret Wars story and its lasting effect on the Marvel universe, as well as honoring the storyline as the "semi-official first Event Comics ever."

== Battleworld ==
Battleworld
- First appearance: Marvel Super Heroes Secret Wars #1 (May 1984)
- Created by: Jim Shooter; Mike Zeck

In-universe information
- Locations: Various
- Publisher: Marvel Comics

Battleworld is a patchwork planet that serves as the setting in Secret Wars. There have been four Battleworlds in total. The first was created by the Beyonder, the second was an imitation created by the Stranger pretending to be the Beyonder, and the third was created by Doctor Doom by stealing the power of the Beyonders.

=== Publication history ===
The first Battleworld debuted in Secret Wars (1984) #1, and was created by Jim Shooter and Mike Zeck.

The second Battleworld debuted in Beyond!, and was created by Dwayne McDuffie and Scott Kolins.

The third Battleworld debuted in Secret Wars (2015) #2, and was created by Jonathan Hickman and Esad Ribić.

The fourth Battleworld debuted in Battleworld (2025) #1, and was created by Christos N. Gage and Marcus To.

=== Planet biography ===
==== First Battleworld ====
The first Battleworld was created by the Beyonder, who merged fragments from many planets to create an unfamiliar environment where contestants can use their powers to the fullest. In the aftermath of Secret Wars, the planet is infected with cosmic energy, causing a "wish fulfillment" phenomenon whereby force of will could alter reality. All the heroes leave Battleworld except for Ben Grimm, who stays behind because the planet's energy allows him to return to his human form. After Grimm returns to Earth, Battleworld has no more reason to exist and breaks apart.

==== Second Battleworld ====
A mock Battleworld was constructed by the Stranger posing as the Beyonder for the purposes of studying various combatants from Earth under the guise of battle. This faux Battleworld is destroyed after the Stranger leaves, with Gravity holding it together long enough for his group to escape at the cost of his life.

==== Third Battleworld ====
A third Battleworld appears in the 2015 series Secret Wars. Following the destruction of the multiverse, Doctor Doom uses the power of the Beyonders to salvage the surviving universes and merge parts of them into Battleworld. Battleworld is divided into domains which are ruled by an appointed Baron or Baroness. This Battleworld collapses after Doom's power is transferred to Reed Richards, who begins restoring the multiverse. After gaining the Power Primordial, Maestro recreates Battleworld.

==== Fourth Battleworld ====
A new Battleworld planet appears in the 2025 series Battleworld. This version was created by Korvac, who sought to repair an anomaly affecting the timeline, Korvac governs a territory called Forest Hills, a technologically advanced city, and is constantly threatened by rival lords and a mysterious "Madness" that is corrupting the population. Korvac picks an assembly of heroes and villains to engage in their own Secret Wars for the survival of their timelines while uncovering the source of the Madness.

=== Known locations ===
==== First Battleworld's locations ====
- Baxter Building – A replica of the Baxter Building.
- Leenn – A location of Battleworld taken from Thing's subconscious that was based on Latveria. It vanished when Thing destroyed the device that the Wizard was guarding.
- Muab – A kingdom of white magic that was attacked by Grimm the Sorcerer.

==== Third Battleworld's locations ====
#	Domain	Baron	Setting	Notes
#1	Greenland	Ungoverned	Planet Hulk	Formed from the remnants of Earth-71612, this area is a desert-like wasteland infested with an assortment of Hulks and other gamma-irradiated creatures. Greenland was formerly ruled by the despot baron Red King before he was killed by Steve Rogers.
#2	Dystopia	Ungoverned	Future Imperfect	Formed from the remnants of Earth-69413. This area was formerly ruled by the iron fist of Maestro, his only opposition being a band of rebels led by Thunderbolt Ross.
#3	Domain of Apocalypse	Ungoverned	Age of Apocalypse	Formed from the remnants of Earth-51518, this area was once many kingdoms ruled by the Horsemen of Apocalypse until they became servants of Apocalypse. Apocalypse was the baron of the domain until he died from the Legacy Virus.
#4	Egyptia	Khonshu and Bast	Forever Yesterday; Secret Wars main series; Secret Wars Journal	This area is an alliance between the Upper and Lower Kingdoms and is formed from the remnants of Earth-51910. The citizens are under the joint control of the deities Khonshu and Bast, who control the population with their Moon Knights and werewolf warriors. Mutants are used as slaves to build Khonshu's pyramids.
#5	Technopolis	Kiri Oshiro	Armor Wars	A futuristic location with high levels of science and technology that was formed from the remnants of Earth-12311. An airborne virus native to Technopolis forces everyone to wear powered armors to survive.
#6	Valley of Doom	Governor Roxxon	1872	It is a location that evokes the traits of the Wild West and is formed from the remnants of Earth-51920.
#7	Spider-Island	Peter Parker	Spider-Island	Formed from the remnants of Earth-19919, this area is infested with an assortment of Man-Spiders.
#8	The Regency	Ungoverned	Amazing Spider-Man: Renew Your Vows	Formed from the remnants of Earth-18119, this area was based on a variation of Manhattan where Regent was behind the deaths and disappearances of many superheroes, while Spider-Man retired to protect his wife Mary Jane Watson and his daughter Annie. The Regency was governed by Regent until Spider-Man came out of retirement to defeat him.
#9	King James' England	Carlos Javier	1602: Witch Hunter Angela	Formed from the remnants of Earth-311, it evokes the traits of England in the year 1602 during the Elizabethan era. King James governed England until he was discovered to be Witchbreed and apparently killed.
#10	Weirdworld	Witch Queen le Fay	Weirdworld	This domain is a floating island that contains sorcery and strange perverted science for it was composed of fragments of many alternate reality magical realms. Following the events of "Secret Wars", Weirdworld manifested on Earth-616 in the Bermuda Triangle.
#11	K'un-L'un	Emperor Shang-Chi	Master of Kung Fu	Based on the mystical city of the same name from Earth-15513, it is a wuxia-inspired domain whose inhabitants are martial artists with mystical abilities and techniques. Every thirteen years, the Emperor of K'un-L'un is chosen by a trial by combat held in the Thirteen Chambers between the masters of their respective schools. Zheng Zu was the long reigning ruler of K'un-L'un until he was usurped by his son Shang-Chi.
#12	Utopolis	Hyperion	Squadron Sinister	Formed from the remnants of Earth-21195, this domain has been annexing the neighboring domains to its territory and killing their champions while leaving one person alive to be that area's puppet ruler. Annexed domains are allowed to retain autonomy as long as they pay 60% of their gross domestic product and 30% of their food storage every month. Anyone who shows signs of weakness is killed as it is considered a capital offense in Utopolis.
#13	New Mars	—N/a	—N/a	Almost nothing has been revealed about this domain except that its formed from the remnants of Earth-691.
#14	Doomgard	—N/a	Thors	This is the home of the Thor Corps, Battleworld's police force. Members of the Thor Corps are inducted based on their ability to lift Mjolnir.
#15	Higher Avalon	Brian Braddock	Secret Wars main series	Higher Avalon was formed from the remnants of Earth-81518. The previous Baron, Jamie Braddock, was exiled to the Shield and died in the Deadlands after taking the blame for Brian's actions towards God Emperor Doom.
#16	Arachnia	Ungoverned	Spider-Verse	Formed from the remnants of Earth-22191, Arachnia is a variation of New York City where Gwen Stacy was killed, Spider-Man disappeared, and Norman Osborn resurfaced ten years later as the head of Ozcorp and eventually become the Mayor of Arachnia. Osborn as the "baron" of Arachnia was later deposed by the Spider-Heroes.
#17	Marville	—N/a	Giant-Size Little Marvel: AvX	Formed from the remnants of Earth-71912, this area is inhabited by child versions of the Avengers and the X-Men.
#18	Isle of Agamotto	Ungoverned	Secret Wars main series	This secret isle is the home of Sheriff Strange to serve as his remembrance of Earth-616. Since Strange's death at the hands of God Emperor Doom, the island is considered abandoned.
#19	Doomstadt	God Emperor Doom	Secret Wars main series; Runaways; Ghost Racers	Doomstadt is the capital of Battleworld and the base of God Emperor Doom and Sheriff Strange.
#19A	Norseheim	God Emperor Doom	Future Imperfect	A system of caverns located beneath Doomstadt and formed from the remnants of the Asgardian Ten Realms. Norseheim is inhabited by Ulik and the Rock Trolls as well as Rick Jones, who guards the Destroyer armor.
#20	Kingdom of Manhattan	—N/a	—N/a	The Incursion point from Earth-616 and Earth-1610's destruction that were fused together by God Emperor Doom. Because of that, the domain is divided upon two different Manhattans coexisting next to each other and split into four parts.
#20A	New Attilan	Blackagar Boltagon	Inhumans: Attilan Rising	Based on the Inhuman city of the same name, New Attilan is above the Earth-616 Manhattan and the Earth-1610 Manhattan. New Attilan serves as the capital of the Kingdom of Manhattan. The Fortress of the domain's Baron is located here. Medusa was the Baroness of the domain until she was accidentally killed by Black Bolt. Medusa was resurrected by Doom, but Black Bolt remained Baron.
#20B	Earth-616 Manhattan	Blackagar Boltagon	Ultimate End	This version of Manhattan was combined with the Earth-1610 Manhattan enabling them to coexist.
#20C	Earth-1610 Manhattan	Blackagar Boltagon	Ultimate End	This version of Manhattan was combined with the Earth-616 Manhattan enabling them to coexist.
#20D	Manhattan: Monster Metropolis	Ungoverned	Mrs. Deadpool and the Howling Commandos	Based on the setting of the same name, Monster Metropolis is an underground location beneath the two Manhattans where an assortment of monsters dwell. Dracula was the governor of Monster Metropolis before he was killed by Shiklah. Due to dissent that Dracula failed to deal with, the Thor Corps attack Monster Metropolis and kill most of its inhabitants.
#21	City	—N/a	—N/a	The city is made up of an assortment of sub-domains.
#21A	Holy Wood	Destroyed	The Korvac Saga	
#21B	Forest Hills	Destroyed	The Korvac Saga	
#21C	Yinsen City	Big Boss Hill	Captain Britain and the Mighty Defenders	Formed from the remnants of Earth-25315, Yinsen City is a futuristic, utopian city located north of the Warzone.
#21D	Mondo City	Big Boss Hill	Captain Britain and the Mighty Defenders	Formed from the remnants of Earth-32134, Mondo City is located near Yinsen City.
#22	Warzone	—N/a	Civil War	Formed from the remnants of Earth-32323, this domain is where President Anthony Stark is in a war with Steve Rogers (known as General America). Stark and Rogers sacrificed themselves to stop the Skrulls causing Jennifer Walters and Peter Parker to take their place two months later.
#22A	The Iron	Jennifer Walters and Peter Parker	Civil War	Located on the eastern side of the Divide, the Iron was President Tony Stark's territory with Resilient Alpha as its capital. After Stark's death, Jennifer Walters took his place as the leader of the Iron.
#22B	The Divide	Jennifer Walters and Peter Parker	Civil War	
#22C	The Blue	Jennifer Walters and Peter Parker	Civil War	Located on the west of the Divide, the Blue was General America's territory. After General America's death, Peter Parker took his place as the leader of the Blue.
#23	New Quack City	—N/a	Howard the Human	Formed from the remnants of Earth-82081, this domain is a city inhabited with anthropomorphic animals.
#24	Far East	—N/a	Where Monsters Dwell	Formed from the remains of Earth-200100, this domain is an Asian-themed location.
#25	Valley of Flame	—N/a	Where Monsters Dwell	Formed from the remnants of Earth-200111, this domain is a prehistoric jungle location resembling the Savage Land.
#26	Hydra Empire	United Confederacy of Hydra	Hail Hydra	Formed from the remains of Earth-85826, this domain is a variation of New York City ruled by the United Confederacy of Hydra.
#27	2099	Miguel Stone	Secret Wars 2099	A futuristic area formed from the remnants of Earth-23291, which is a variation of the Marvel 2099 universe. The 2099 Avengers protect Nueva City and are overseen by Miguel Stone.
#28	Hala Field	Jacqueline Cochran	Captain Marvel and the Carol Corps.	Hala Field was formed from the remnants of Earth-31333. It is protected by the Banshee Squadron air force.
#29	Monarchy of M	King Erik Magnus	House of M	An area formed from the remnants of Earth-58163, a world in which mutants rule over humans.
#30	Sentinel Territories	President Robert Kelly	Years of Future Past	Formed from the remnants of Earth-25158, the Sentinel Territories consist of an alternate version of the United States of America called the United Doomstates, where Robert Kelly's rise to power as President led to mutants and superhumans being imprisoned, sterilized, and used for experiments.
#31	Wastelands	—N/a	Old Man Logan	Formed from the remnants of Earth-21923, it is a desert-like location where an older version of Wolverine resides.
#32	Mutopia	—N/a	E is For Extinction	Mutopia was formed from the remnants of Earth-55133, where mutants and humans managed to achieve coexistence. Following Professor X's death, Magneto formed his own version of the X-Men.
#33	Westchester	President Robert Kelly	X-Men '92	Formed from the remnants of Earth-92131.
#34	Killville	MODOK	MODOK Assassin	Formed from the remnants of Earth-11131, in which every superhero was killed by MODOK and citizens are constantly exposed to the damage caused by the killers and villains waging war amongst themselves. The former Baron of Killville was Karl Mordo until he was killed by MODOK.
#35	Arcadia	Jennifer Walters	A-Force	Formed from the remnants of Earth-16191, Arcadia is an island nation that is filled with female superheroes.
#36	Bar Sinister	Mister Sinister	Secret Wars main series; Secret Wars Journal	Formed from the remnants of Earth-21919, this domain is dominated by an army of Nathaniel Essex's clones. Following the Secret Wars storyline, Bar Sinister manifested in the South Pacific on Earth-616.
#37	Limbo	Madelyne Pryor	Inferno	Formed from the remnants of Earth-91240, this domain is a variation of New York City where Manhattan became a Hell-like area infested by demons from Limbo and had to be forcibly splintered from the rest of the domain by a forcefield.
#38	Deadlands	Outside God Emperor Doom's jurisdiction	Marvel Zombies	Formed from the remnants of Earth-2149, it is an area that is infested with zombie versions of Marvel characters and evokes the traits of a zombie apocalypse.
#39	Perfection	Outside God Emperor Doom's jurisdiction	Age of Ultron	An area that is filled with Ultron Sentinels. This was formed from the remnants of Earth-21261, where Ultron conquered Earth.
#40	New Xandar	Outside God Emperor Doom's jurisdiction	The Infinity Gauntlet	An area that is filled with insectoid creatures that make up the Annihilation Wave. This was formed from the remnants of Earth-94241, where the Annihilation Wave decimated Earth after overpowering the Nova Corps.
#41	Shield	Collapsed	Siege	Originally called the "Wall," the Shield is a massive structure that separates the Deadlands, Perfection, and New Xandar from the rest of Battleworld. The Shield collapses after the Thing leaves to confront God Emperor Doom.
#41A	Subterranea	Mole Man	Secret Wars Journal	An underground kingdom built by Mole Man. Subterranea is located near the Shield, allowing Mole Man to maintain it without submitting to God Emperor Doom.
Other domains unidentified in the Battleworld map
#42	Breakland	Destroyed	Siege	Although the actual existence of Breakland is questionable, according to the history of Battleworld, 30 years ago the Shield was breached, allowing the combined forces of the Deadlands, Perfection, and New Xandar to run amok on Battleworld. Several regions were destroyed with Breakland among them.
#43	X-Topia	Rachel Grey	X-Tinction Agenda	Formed from the remnants of Earth-24201, X-Topia Province has the island of Genosha as part of its domain which has been quarantined due to a plague. The capital of this domain is X-City. The domain is apparently kept hidden from the rest of the domains because they have the technology necessary to travel across space and time.
#44	Old Town	—N/a	Secret Wars Journal	Formed from the remnants of Earth-15203 which contained a variation of Marvel Noir, Old Town is a domain that evokes the traits of the 1920s and the 1930s. It is located near the Domain of Apocalypse.
#45	Unidentified Domain #1	—N/a	Spider-Island	Formed from the remnants of Earth-982.
#46	Walled City of New York	—N/a	Hank Johnson, Agent of Hydra	One of the few unknown domains. It is formed from the remnants of Earth-21722, where New York City is surrounded by a defensive wall. One part of the Walled City of New York is under Hydra's control, while the other part is under S.H.I.E.L.D.'s control.
#47	Bug World	—N/a	Hank Johnson, Agent of Hydra	Formed from the remnants of Earth-22312, this domain is a version of New York City that is inhabited by insect versions of the heroes and villains.
#48	Metropolitia	Gorilla-Man/Baron Helmut Zemo	Secret Wars: Agents of Atlas	A sprawling megacity whose population is enslaved to forge the weapons of Battleworld. The city is policed by the S.H.I.E.L.D. and was formerly ruled by Heinrich Zemo. Heinrich Zemo was eventually killed by the Agents of Atlas. His successor, Helmut Zemo, was cursed as a side effect of killing Gorilla-Man and turned into the new Gorilla-Man.
#49	Unidentified Domain #2	—N/a	Secret Wars Too	A domain formed from the remnants of Earth-617.
#50	Hell's Kitchen's Kitchen	Ungoverned	Secret Wars Too	A domain where Galactus has finally succeeded. Spider-Man defeats Galactus and make him and the hacker Social Justice Watcher leave Hell's Kitchen's Kitchen.
#51	Demolition House	Baron Dunphy	Secret Wars Too	Nothing is known about this domain except that its Baron is Dennis Dunphy.
#52	The Uncle Ben-a-verse	Uncle Ben	Secret Wars Too	
#53	XXX	—N/a	Secret Wars Too	A domain where at least three alternate versions of Cyclops try to date Jean Grey (who is dating that domain's Wolverine). Its location appears to be near Marvel All-Bear.
#54	Marvel All-Bear	—N/a	Secret Wars Too	
#55	Rule 63	—N/a	Secret Wars Too	A domain which states that for every fictional character, there exists an opposite-gender counterpart.
Other places absent from the Battleworld map
#56	Salvation	Ungoverned	Age of Ultron vs. Marvel Zombies	Salvation is a hidden refuge located between the borders of the Deadlands and Perfection and serves those who seek refuge from the Zombies and the Ultron Sentinels. This sanctuary was created by three of Lord Ultron's former pawns who escaped Perfection: Human Torch, the Vision, and Wonder Man.
#57	Knowhere	Ungoverned	Guardians of Knowhere	The severed Celestial head orbits Battleworld like a moon and contains the city of Knowhere.
#58	Mojo dot Mojo	Ungoverned	Secret Wars: Battleworld	Based on the Mojoverse, Mojo dot Mojo is a clandestine place located somewhere underneath Battleworld. It is where Mojo collects and produces television programs from every part of Battleworld.
#59	Negative Zone	Ungoverned	Civil War	The Negative Zone is located inside Battleworld and appears to act as its core.

== Sequels ==
One year later, Secret Wars II was published, with the Beyonder visiting Earth and having a tie-in with almost every Marvel comic book written at the time.

Marvel published a third Secret Wars tale written by Steve Englehart and drawn by Keith Pollard within two issues of the Fantastic Four series: the "Secret Wars III" story in Fantastic Four #318–319 (September–October 1988).

In 2006, a six issue series entitled Beyond! was published by Marvel. Written by Dwayne McDuffie and illustrated by Scott Kolins, it referred back to the original Secret Wars event with a similar premise as the Beyonder again transported superheroes and supervillains of Earth to fight on Battleworld.

Spider-Man & the Secret Wars, a Marvel Adventures all-ages non-canonical miniseries, was released in 2010. It tells the story from Spider-Man's perspective and features major discrepancies with the original event. These tales include him receiving the Beyonder's power and creating "New Parker City", Spider-Man and the Thing spying on Dr. Doom, and a story featuring Spider-Man's suspicions concerning the Hulk. It was released in conjunction with Avengers & The Infinity Gauntlet and Captain America & The Korvac Saga, similar self-contained, all-ages re-imaginations of past events, that appear to take place in their own separate continuities in the standard "Marvel Adventures" manner.

The four-issue miniseries Deadpool's Secret Secret Wars was released during the 2015 Secret Wars event. It retold the events of the original miniseries from Deadpool's point of view and used retroactive continuity to fix inconsistencies with later stories. In the end, the Wasp accidentally caused everyone to forget his involvement in the storyline, creating the inconsistencies.

A four-issue miniseries titled Marvel Super Heroes Secret Wars: Battleworld was released in conjunction with the 40th anniversary of the original series, beginning in November 2023. The series starred Spider-Man and the Human Torch and claimed to "expose never-before-told secrets" from the 1984 storyline.

== Other versions ==
=== What If? ===
Some issues of What If? revolve around the Secret Wars:

- "Brave New World" by Jay Faerber and Gregg Schigiel explored what would happen if the heroes became stranded on Battleworld after Galactus and the Beyonder destroy each other in battle. The battle continues for a while, but after the deaths of Bulldozer, Captain Marvel, Cyclops, Doctor Octopus, Kang, Magneto, and Spider-Woman, both sides declare peace. The Hulk heads into the wilderness to find a way to get everyone back home while Doctor Doom builds a replica of his Latverian castle. The Enchantress disappears, Mister Fantastic dies, and Spider-Man's black costume accelerates his aging to the point of becoming a skeleton. Eventually, some of the inhabitants have children who inherit some of their powers including Bravado (son of Thor and Enchantress), Chokehold (daughter of Absorbing Man and Titania), Crusader (daughter of Captain America and Rogue), Firefly (son of Human Torch and Wasp), Gator (son of Lizard), Malefactor (son of Doctor Doom and Enchantress), Moleculon (son of Molecule Man and Volcana), Mustang (son of Hawkeye and She-Hulk), Raze (son of Wrecker), and Torrent (son of Storm and Wolverine). By Bravado's 18th birthday, Malefactor disposes of his father and gathers Chokehold, Gator, Klaw, Moleculon, and Raze in a plot to take over Battleworld. Bravado, Crusader, Firefly, Mustang, Torrent, and the heroes and reformed villains defeat them. The Hulk and Doctor Doom (who faked his death when Malefactor attacked him) return to help end the conflict. The Hulk uses 30th century technology from Kang to create a portal that will take everyone home with the help of Thor's hammer, but the heroes are dissuaded by Uatu, who warns them of a bad thing that will happen if they return to Earth. Though the adults call off the trip, the younger heroes sneak out at night and end up on Earth, which is overrun with Sentinels. The five agree to stay on Earth as the Avengers and liberate Earth.
- In another alternate universe, Doctor Doom retains the Beyonder's power and takes over the universe.

=== Secret Wars (2015 comic book) ===
In May 2015, Marvel published a new Secret Wars miniseries, written by Jonathan Hickman and drawn by Esad Ribić, that picked up from where the "Time Runs Out" storyline running in The Avengers and New Avengers at the time had ended. The storyline involved the Marvel Universe combining with other alternate universes, including the Ultimate Universe, as well as the 2099 Universe, to form Battleworld, a world which exhibits aspects of the various universes. The core limited series was nine issues long, and ran for eight months, ending in January 2016. One of the core miniseries, Ultimate End, had ended the Ultimate Marvel imprint after 15 years at the time. Ultimate End is written by Brian Michael Bendis and artist Mark Bagley, the team that began the Ultimate Marvel universe with Ultimate Spider-Man.

=== Spider-Man: Life Story ===
In Spider-Man: Life Story, which depicts an alternate version of the Marvel Universe (designated Earth-19529) where characters aged in real time and debuted in the same year as their first issue publications, the Secret Wars began in 1984 when a number of United States-based superheroes were transported to Battleworld by the Beyonder. This causes the start of the "Russian War" (the World War III of this reality) on Earth due to the absence of the majority of America's superheroes. Among them was Spider-Man, who received the Venom symbiote/black costume like his Earth-616 counterpart.

== In other media ==
=== Television ===
- "Secret Wars" serves as inspiration for a self-titled three-part episode of Spider-Man: The Animated Series. In this version of events, the Beyonder and Madame Web task Spider-Man with leading the Fantastic Four, Iron Man, Captain America, Storm, and the Black Cat in liberating Battleworld from Doctor Octopus, Doctor Doom, Alistair Smythe, the Lizard, and the Red Skull to test his capability in saving the multiverse from Spider-Carnage. Amidst production of the episode, the cast of X-Men: The Animated Series were due to appear. However, the cost of transportation from Canada to Los Angeles proved too costly, leading to most of the X-Men being dropped. Moreover, the Hulk and She-Hulk were excluded due to The Incredible Hulk being on UPN. Additionally, Spider-Man obtaining his black suit is adapted into the earlier episode "The Alien Costume".
- "Secret Wars" serves as inspiration for the fourth season of Avengers Assemble, Avengers: Secret Wars. After learning of Earth from Loki, the Beyonder uses the Bifröst to take and combine parts of Earth, Asgard, and the multiverse to form Battleworld as part of an experiment. After getting caught in this, the Avengers and New Avengers, among others, join forces to undo the merge and defeat the Beyonder and Loki.

=== Video games ===
- Battleworld appears in Marvel Contest of Champions and its 2020 spin-off Marvel Realm of Champions.
- A variation of Battleworld, renamed Primary Earth, appears in Marvel Future Revolution. This version was created after Vision sacrificed himself to save his Earth from multiverse-destroying incursions.

=== Literature ===
In 2016, Secret Wars received a novelization written by Alex Irvine.

=== Merchandise ===
- Mattel released three waves of action figures, vehicles, and accessories in the Secret Wars toy line from 1984 to 1985.
- An original page of the 1984 Marvel Superheroes Secret Wars, showing Spider-Man wearing the black suit for the first time, was sold by Heritage Auctions in January 2022 for over $3 million.

=== Miscellaneous ===
- Funko released a collectible card game called Marvel Battleworld, which is loosely inspired by the Secret Wars comic book events.
- Battleworld appears in a self-titled web series.

== Collected editions ==
Title	Material collected	Published date	ISBN
Secret Wars	Marvel Super-Heroes Secret Wars #1–12	December 2011	978-0785158684
Secret Wars Omnibus	Marvel Super-Heroes Secret Wars #1–12, Thor (vol. 1) #383, She-Hulk (vol. 1) #10, What If? (vol. 2) #4, 114	December 2008	978-0785132936
Marvel Super Heroes Secret Wars: Battleworld Box Set	Marvel Super-Heroes Secret Wars #1–12, Amazing Spider-Man #251–252, Incredible Hulk #294–295, Iron Man #181–182, Thing #10, Uncanny X-Men #180–181, Captain America #292, Avengers #242–243, Thor #341 and material from Fantastic Four #265. Also includes Thing: Battleworld, Marvel Super-Heroes Secret Wars Aftermath, Secret Wars II Vol. 1–4, Secret War, Beyond the Secret Wars and Marvel Super-Heroes Secret Wars: Behind the Scenes.	June 2015	978-0785197515
