= Nicholas Scratch =

Marvel Comics fictional character

- Nicholas Scratch taken from a splash page of Fantastic Four #5 (March 2023). Art by Ivan Fiorelli.

Publication information
- Publisher: Marvel Comics
- First appearance: Fantastic Four #185 (August 1977)
- Created by: Len Wein (writer), George Pérez (artist)

In-story information
- Species: Warlock
- Partnerships: Dormammu; Salem's Seven
- Abilities: Vast magical powers

Nicholas Scratch is a supervillain appearing in American comic books published by Marvel Comics. The son of Agatha Harkness, he is a warlock and father of the Salem's Seven and predominantly a foe of the Fantastic Four and Patsy Walker.

The character made his live-action debut in the Marvel Cinematic Universe miniseries Agatha All Along, portrayed by Abel Lysenko.

== Publication history ==
Nicholas Scratch first appeared in Fantastic Four #185 (August 1977) and was created by Len Wein (writer) and George Pérez (artist).

The name "Nicholas Scratch" is an amalgam of colloquial and euphemistic names for the Devil: "Old Nick" and "Old Scratch" or "Mr. Scratch" (as used in "The Devil and Daniel Webster").

== Fictional character biography ==
The son of Agatha Harkness, Nicholas Scratch originates from New Salem, Colorado, a secret community of magic users. Scratch fathered seven children who would come to be known as Salem's Seven. Scratch, now a warlock, becomes the leader of New Salem and manipulates its residents into believing that Harkness had betrayed them through her dealings with the outside world. The New Salem witches abduct Harkness, intending to execute her. The Fantastic Four confront Scratch at Harkness's trial, where all of the New Salem community is present. They counter Scratch's claims against Harkness by explaining that they had not known of New Salem until Scratch's actions made them aware of it. Outraged, Scratch attacks, only to be banished to another dimension known as the Dark Realm.

While in the Dark Realm, Scratch restores the Seven's powers and brainwashes the Fantastic Four to conquer the world, but Harkness thwarts his plans and confines him to the Dark Realm. From the Dark Realm, he takes control of Franklin Richards and has Salem's Seven take over New Salem, but is defeated by Agatha Harkness and Gabriel the Devil Hunter. Harkness removes Scratch's powers and disowns him as her son.

Following the destruction of New Salem, Scratch resurfaces in the town of Centerville as "Mayor Nicholas", which, along with its residents, had entered a contract as an amusement park version of "America's Heartland Next-Door." When Patsy Walker returns to visit her hometown, she discovers that its residents have been possessed by demons. The Avengers and the Thunderbolts help to clear the town, which was being victimized by a conspiracy composed of the amusement park developers, the Sons of the Serpent, and Salem's Seven. After defeating them, the Avengers and the Thunderbolts depart, but Patsy decides to stay in Centerville.

After discovering that Scratch is the mastermind behind the ongoing haunting of Centerville, Patsy defeats him and accuses him of serving Mephisto. However, Scratch summons his true master, Dormammu, who abducts Hellcat and reveals his plans for domination by conquering Hell and that Scratch will become Sorcerer Supreme. However, the Hell Lords thwart Dormammu's plan and he and Scratch flee.

In Marvel Knights 4, Scratch manipulates the Seven and the Fantastic Four into releasing Shuma-Gorath. However, he is defeated and banished to Hell, where he meets and allies with Mephisto.

== Powers and abilities ==
Nicholas Scratch possesses vast indeterminate power through manipulation of the forces of magic. This gives him various magical powers, including teleportation, energy manipulation, dimensional travel, mind control, telepathy, and illusion generation. Scratch also wields the Satan Staff, a mystical power object that focuses his magic.

== In other media ==
- Nicholas Scratch appears in The Avengers: United They Stand episode "The Sorceress's Apprentice", voiced by Stephen Ouimette.
- Nicholas Scratch appears in Agatha All Along, portrayed by Abel Lysenko. This version was born in the 1750s and was intended to die at birth. However, Agatha Harkness saves him by bargaining with Death to raise him for six years until he ultimately dies.
