= Agatha Harkness =

Marvel Comics fictional character

- Agatha Harkness and her familiar, Ebony

Publication information
- Publisher: Marvel Comics
- First appearance: Fantastic Four #94 (January 1970)
- Created by: Stan Lee (writer); Jack Kirby (artist)

In-story information
- Species: Human
- Team affiliations: Witches of New Salem; Daughters of Liberty; Strange Academy
- Partnerships: Fantastic Four; Scarlet Witch
- Notable aliases: Prof. Emeritus Harkness
- Abilities: Extensive knowledge of magic and magical objects; Magic mastery

Altered in-story information for adaptations to other media
- Partnerships: Death (Rio Vidal); William Kaplan (Billy Maximoff)

Agatha Harkness is a character appearing in American comic books published by Marvel Comics. Created by writer Stan Lee and artist Jack Kirby, the character first appeared in Fantastic Four #94 (October 1969; cover dated January 1970). Agatha Harkness is a powerful witch and one of the original witches from the Salem witch trials.

The character debuted as the governess to Franklin Richards, serving as an ally to the Fantastic Four. She trained the Scarlet Witch / Wanda Maximoff in the art of magic. Harkness is the mother of the warlock Nicholas Scratch and the grandmother of the Salem's Seven. She has also been a member of the Daughters of Liberty. Originally depicted as an elderly woman, Harkness was able to become young again and increased her strength.

Since her introduction in comics, the character has been featured in various other Marvel-licensed products, including video games, animated television series, and merchandise. Agatha Harkness made her live-action debut in the Marvel Cinematic Universe (MCU) live-action miniseries WandaVision (2021), portrayed by Kathryn Hahn, who reprised the role in the spin-off series Agatha All Along (2024).

== Publication history ==
Agatha Harkness debuted in Fantastic Four #94 (October 1969), created by Stan Lee and Jack Kirby. She appeared in the "Avengers Disassembled" storyline, the 2022 Midnight Suns series, the 2023 Scarlet Witch Annual one-shot, the 2024 House of Harkness series, and the 2024 Agatha Harkness: The Saga of the Salem Witch trade paperback.

== Fictional character biography ==
=== 1970s ===
Agatha Harkness was introduced as the governess of Franklin Richards. When the Frightful Four neutralised the Fantastic Four, she defeated the villains herself, without telling the Fantastic Four that she had done so or that she was a witch. She revealed her identity to them later, and aided them in battle against Annihilus.

Through the actions of her son Nicholas Scratch, she was revealed as a member of the previously unknown New Salem, Colorado, a colony of witches of whom she had been the leader. Scratch had taken control of the town and persuaded its inhabitants that Harkness betrayed the community's secrets by working for the Fantastic Four. She was abducted and taken back to the community with Franklin to stand trial. The Fantastic Four followed and came into conflict with Salem's Seven, Harkness's grandchildren fathered by Scratch. The Fantastic Four defeated them and freed Harkness. In the process, Scratch's evil was revealed to the community of New Salem and he was banished to another dimension. Harkness became the magical tutor for the Scarlet Witch in the use of witchcraft.

Scratch and Salem's Seven returned, and Harkness foiled their attempt to conquer the world.

=== 1980s ===
Eventually, Salem's Seven took over the New Salem community again. They captured Harkness and killed her by burning her at the stake, although Harkness soon made her presence known to Wanda in what appeared to be a post-death astral form. In an ensuing battle between the Scarlet Witch and Salem's Seven, the entire community's energies were drawn into Vertigo of the Seven, who lost control of them. Wanda managed to capture some of the energy and funnel it away, but the entire town was destroyed. Following hints from Harkness's astral form, Wanda channeled the remaining energy to become pregnant with twin children of the Vision, her android husband.

Later, Harkness resurfaced, again alive and well, when Wanda's infant children began exhibiting odd behavior (disappearing for brief periods of time) and Wanda became unstable after her husband's dismantling; Harkness provided no explanation for her return. After Mephisto claimed that Scarlet Witch's children were actually fragments of his own soul and reabsorbs them, Harkness briefly mind-wiped Wanda's memory of her children in an attempt to help her deal with the trauma. Harkness later restored those memories soon after when Wanda became a pawn in a complex plot by Immortus. Harkness aided the Avengers in their battle against Immortus.

=== 2000s ===
==== "Avengers Disassembled" ====
Wanda, again having no memory of her children, angrily confronted Harkness about their existence. Nick Fury of S.H.I.E.L.D. found what appeared to be Harkness's corpse in her home and concluded that Harkness had been dead for a long time. Some time later, a partially amnesiac Wanda tells Clint Barton she is under the care of her "Aunt Harkness" in a small apartment. However, this version of Wanda was later revealed to be a Doombot that replaced the real Wanda at some point.

==== Ghost life ====
Harkness has since made her presence known in the New Multiverse as a ghost. She appears to Wanda and confirms her death at the hands of her protégé. She also concurrently serves as the omniscient narrator of Vision's ongoing solo title, having induced precognitive visions through an arcane ritual involving the murder of Ebony at some undetermined point before her death. Harkness fights alongside Wanda and the spirit of her biological mother Natalya Maximoff against a physical manifestation of Chaos which is attempting to destroy witchcraft. The two spirits channel their magic through Wanda and, after Quicksilver is summoned, they manage to defeat the being once and for all although this has gravely wounded Order, the Goddess of Witchcraft. Natalya sacrifices herself to restore Order and, in doing so, also returns Harkness to life. Despite noting that her and Wanda's paths are intertwined, Harkness chooses to have some time to herself to enjoy being alive again.

=== 2020s ===
Textless variant cover of Midnight Suns #3 (November 2022). Art by InHyuk Lee.

==== The Daughters of Liberty ====
Agatha Harkness later appears as a member of the Daughters of Liberty, teaching magic to its members. At the time when Captain America figured out that Dryad is a revived Peggy Carter, Harkness teleported herself to inform him that the threats that the Daughters of Liberty have been facing are connected with Aleksander Lukin's wife Alexa. Harkness later briefed the Daughters of Liberty's latest recruit Shuri about the situation involving Selene having Sharon Carter's soul. She then proceeded to transport herself, Carter, and Shuri to where Selene is located.

==== Midnight Suns ====
During the battle with Corina (now calling herself Korrosion), a gigantic explosion of energy was unleashed due to the Black Mirror's destruction and neither Korrosion or Agatha Harkness were anywhere to be found. It later turns out that the explosion had sent them back to their homeworlds where they belong. Harkness discovers that by absorbing the Mirror's energy, she has been restored to her physical and mental prime and is now a young woman again. She briefly goes into hiding as she adjusts to her new body.

==== Restoring the Darkhold ====
During the "Contest of Chaos" storyline, Harkness uses Chthon's remains to create a new Darkhold and starts by having Spider-Man and Wolverine fight each other in the Amazon rainforest. Harkness proceeds to pit various heroes against each other in pairs. After a brief battle with Clea on the astral plane, Harkness returns to her body in the Bermuda Triangle while in the presence of her champions. When Captain Marvel and Scarlet Witch try to reason with her. Harkness escapes and witnesses the Darkhold take on a sentient form. The Darkhold later flees from Harkness and escapes into a river.

== Powers and abilities ==
Agatha Harkness is a powerful magic user. She is also an expert in arcane knowledge. She erased the memories of Wanda Maximoff dealing with her children with a spell. She displayed powerful telepathic abilities.

Agatha Harkness was initially presented simply as an elderly woman with magical powers and a feline familiar; later it was disclosed that she had kept herself alive for centuries through magic. A mystical rebirth results in Harkness aging backwards into a young woman, which also vastly increases her powers.

=== Ebony ===
Harkness owns a familiar black cat named Ebony. Ebony was able to transform into a large ferocious wildcat of great strength, speed, and claws. Ebony was eventually sacrificed by Harkness in a ritual to gain precognitive powers. She is later resurrected through unknown methods.

== Reception ==
=== Critical response ===
Deirdre Kaye of Scary Mommy called Agatha Harkness a "role model" and a "truly heroic" female character. The A.V. Club ranked Agatha Harkness 38th in their "100 Best Marvel Characters" list.

==== Marvel Cinematic Universe ====
Brady Langmann of Esquire ranked Agatha Harkness 4th in their "Best Characters in the Marvel Cinematic Universe" list. He praised Kathryn Hahn's portrayal of Harkness, describing her as a "legendary character actress" who transformed what could have been a forgettable villain into a standout performance in the MCU. Ben Saffle of Comic Book Resources stated Harkness gained a "fandom following her antics" in WandaVision which resulted in her starring in her own spin-off. Richard Fink of MovieWeb said that Hahn's portrayal of Harkness in WandaVision transformed her from a quippy villain into a standout character within the MCU. He praised Hahn's dynamic performance for blending humor with a sinister edge, which resonated with audiences. Fink found that Harkness' journey from antagonist to potential ally creates opportunities for compelling storytelling in her own television series. He stated that Harkness could fill a similar role to Loki as a charismatic villain, adding depth to the MCU's expanding mystical universe. Cat Hampton of Collider called Harkness a fan favorite because of "Agatha All Along."

=== Impact ===
The character of Captain Jack Harkness from Doctor Who and its spin-off Torchwood was named after Agatha Harkness.

== Other versions ==
=== Old Man Logan ===
In the Old Man Logan reality of Earth-21923, Agatha Harkness had her powers drained by Baron Mordo.

=== Ultimate Marvel ===
An alternate universe version of Agatha Harkness appears in Ultimate Fantastic Four. This version is a young woman and claims to be a S.H.I.E.L.D. psychologist sent to evaluate the Baxter Building think tank. It is later revealed that her S.H.I.E.L.D status was faked and she is an ancient empathic being who destroyed Atlantis. Known as the Dragon-of-Seven or the Hydra, it can exist as a single creature or as seven seemingly separate ones. In her form as a group of seven individuals, Harkness poses as the superhero group Salem Seven.

== In other media ==
=== Television ===
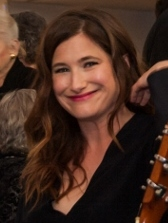
Kathryn Hahn portrays Agatha Harkness in the Marvel Cinematic Universe

- Agatha Harkness appears in The Avengers: United They Stand episode "The Sorceress's Apprentice", voiced by Elizabeth Shepherd.
- Agatha Harkness appears in X-Men: Evolution, voiced by Pauline Newstone. This version was recruited by Mystique to train the Scarlet Witch.
- Agatha Harkness appears in TV series set in the Marvel Cinematic Universe (MCU), portrayed by Kathryn Hahn. This version has a pet rabbit named Señor Scratchy and previously killed her coven and her mother Evanora during a failed execution attempt. She first appears in WandaVision before making a subsequent appearance in Agatha All Along. Additionally, an alternate timeline variant of Agatha appears in the What If...? episode "What If... Agatha Went to Hollywood?", voiced by Hahn.

=== Prose fiction ===
- In 2026, Random House/Marvel published Agatha Harkness: Fall of the Coven, a standalone young adult novel by Sara Shepard. The novel reimagines Agatha as a teenage witch from colonial Salem who is magically transported to a modern-day high school.
- In 2025, Insight Editions/Marvel published The Grimoire of Agatha Harkness: A Magical History and Spellbook, a standalone book by Andrea Hannah and Danny Lore. The book is presented as the Spellbook of Agatha Harkness, compiled over the centuries and detailing the supernatural world from her point of view.

=== Video games ===
- Agatha Harkness appears as a playable character in Marvel Strike Force. Additionally, the MCU incarnation appears as an alternate skin.
- Agatha Harkness appears in Marvel Snap.
- Agatha Harkness appears in Marvel's Midnight Suns, voiced by Courtenay Taylor. This version is in a relationship with the Caretaker.
- Agatha Harkness appears as a playable character in Marvel Contest of Champions.

=== Merchandise ===
- The MCU incarnation of Agatha Harkness received two Funko Pop figures in 2021 and 2024.
- The MCU incarnation of Agatha Harkness received an action figure in the Marvel Legends line in 2023.
