= Salem's Seven =

Magical beings in Marvel Comics

Publication information
- Publisher: Marvel Comics
- First appearance: Fantastic Four #186 (September 1977)
- Created by: Len Wein (writer); George Pérez (artist)

In-story information
- Base(s): New Salem, Colorado, US
- Member(s): Brutacus; Gazelle; Hydron; Reptilla; Thornn; Vakume; Vertigo

Salem's Seven is a fictional team of magical beings and former supervillains appearing in Marvel Comics. They were initially foes of the Scarlet Witch and the Fantastic Four, but became allies to both. All seven are the children of Nicholas Scratch and the grandchildren of Agatha Harkness. They are witches and warlocks with magic powers who can transform into fantastic creatures with super-powers.

Salem's Seven appear in the Marvel Cinematic Universe / Disney+ series Agatha All Along (2024).

== Publication history ==
The team first appeared in Fantastic Four #186 (September 1977), and was created by Len Wein and George Pérez.

== Fictional history ==
Salem's Seven originated in New Salem, Colorado, a hidden town in an unsettled part of the Rocky Mountains, populated entirely by magic users who mostly lived in fear of normal humanity due to the persecution they faced during the Salem witch trials. Salem's Seven were fathered by Nicholas Scratch with different mothers. Scratch's mother Agatha Harkness was the most powerful of the town's inhabitants, but she chose to live among humanity. In time, she becomes the governess for Franklin Richards (son of Invisible Woman and Mister Fantastic of the Fantastic Four). Scratch has Salem's Seven abduct Agatha purportedly for betraying the New Salem community. They bring Franklin back with them to give to Scratch a new host body, which forces the Fantastic Four to pursue. Although initially overcome and imprisoned, the Four defeat their captors, banish Scratch to another dimension, and save Harkness. When Salem's Seven try to retaliate against Harkness later, she removes their ability to change forms.

Over the years, Salem's Seven manage to reverse the spells locking them away from their enhanced forms, greatly weakening Harkness in the process. They take control of New Salem, and with Vertigo as their leader, they turn the community against Harkness and burn her at the stake. The Scarlet Witch and Vision are drawn to New Salem, where they are captured by the Seven. Gazelle disagrees with the group's plans of sacrifice, and is thrown in with the prisoners. The Vision escapes and battles Vertigo, who draws the powers of the other 665 residents of New Salem into herself. When the Vision defeats Vertigo, she loses control of the power. The Scarlet Witch manages to channel some of it off, but in the ensuing explosion all of New Salem is apparently wiped out, including the Seven.

Brutacus, Hydron, Reptilla, Thornn, and Vakume are reanimated as Arnim Zola's proto-husks, but are promptly killed for humorous effect by Deadpool. The members of Salem's Seven are later resurrected when the Scarlet Witch's mental breakdown and manipulation of magic restore them to life. The seven are taken in by Doctor Strange, who urges a new understanding between the Fantastic Four and the Seven. In The New Warriors, Salem's Seven become the resident protectors of New Salem, which has become a haven for all people "born of magic".

During the "Hunted" storyline, Gazelle is among the animal-themed superhumans who are captured and forced to participate in Kraven the Hunter's Great Hunt as targets. In the ensuing chaos, Gazelle is stabbed by a Hunter-Bot and seemingly killed. She is later revealed to have survived.

== Members ==
- Brutacus - Transforms into a horned lion-like humanoid. In this form, he has strength and durability sufficient to match Thing or Vision.
- Gazelle - Transforms into a cloven-hoofed deer-like person with superhuman speed and agility.
- Hydron - Transforms into a fish-man who can fire controllable streams of water from the stump-end of his left arm.
- Reptilla - Transforms into a snake-like form with a single long snake tail in place of legs and two poisonous snakes in place of arms. She can constrict and bite with her hand-snakes.
- Thornn - Transforms into a yellow demon-like humanoid with red thorns on his arms and legs. He can throw explosive thorns or stunning thorns.
- Vakume - Transforms into a featureless purple humanoid. He can fly, become intangible, and control air by creating winds and vacuums.
- Vertigo - Eldest daughter of Scratch with no special transformation. She is not the same character as Vertigo of the Savage Land Mutates, but possesses the same ability to attack a person's sense of balance.

== Other versions ==
=== Ultimate Marvel ===
An alternate universe incarnation of Salem's Seven appears in Ultimate Fantastic Four. This version is a superhero team based in Salem, Oregon. Its members include:

- Alpha Dog - Leader of the Seven. He can alter the density of objects to make it appear he has super strength and invulnerability.
- Ghostware - Member of the Seven who can make himself and others intangible.
- Neuropath - Member of the Seven with emotional induction that can control others' emotions.
- Penultimate - Member of the Seven with a cybernetically enhanced body and high-tech weaponry.
- Primal Screamer - Member of the Seven with powerful vocal blasts.
- Filament - Member of the Seven who can create hyper-dimensional threads that cut through all matter.
- Synchron - Member of the Seven who can alter probability in such a way that he can be in several positions at once, attacking from many directions.

In issue #56, it is revealed that the group are one being: a creature known as the Dragon-of-Seven that can separate into multiple forms. As a single entity, the Dragon-of-Seven takes the form of Agatha Harkness. The Dragon-of-Seven poses as Harkness and Salem's Seven to make the Fantastic Four doubt their effectiveness as a team, but is killed in battle by Invisible Woman.

== In other media ==
- The Salem's Seven appear in The Avengers: United They Stand episode "The Sorceress Apprentice".
- The Salem's Seven appear in Agatha All Along, consisting of Vertigo portrayed by Okwui Okpokwasili, Snake (portrayed by Marina Mazepa), Crow (portrayed by Bethany Curry), Fox (portrayed by Athena Perample), Rat (portrayed by Britta Grant), Owl (portrayed by Alicia Vela-Bailey), and Coyote (portrayed by Chau Naumova). This version of the group are witches descended from Evanora Harkness' coven. While attempting to locate and kill Evanora's daughter Agatha, the Salem's Seven are killed by Lilia Calderu.
