= Mike Zeck =

American comics artist

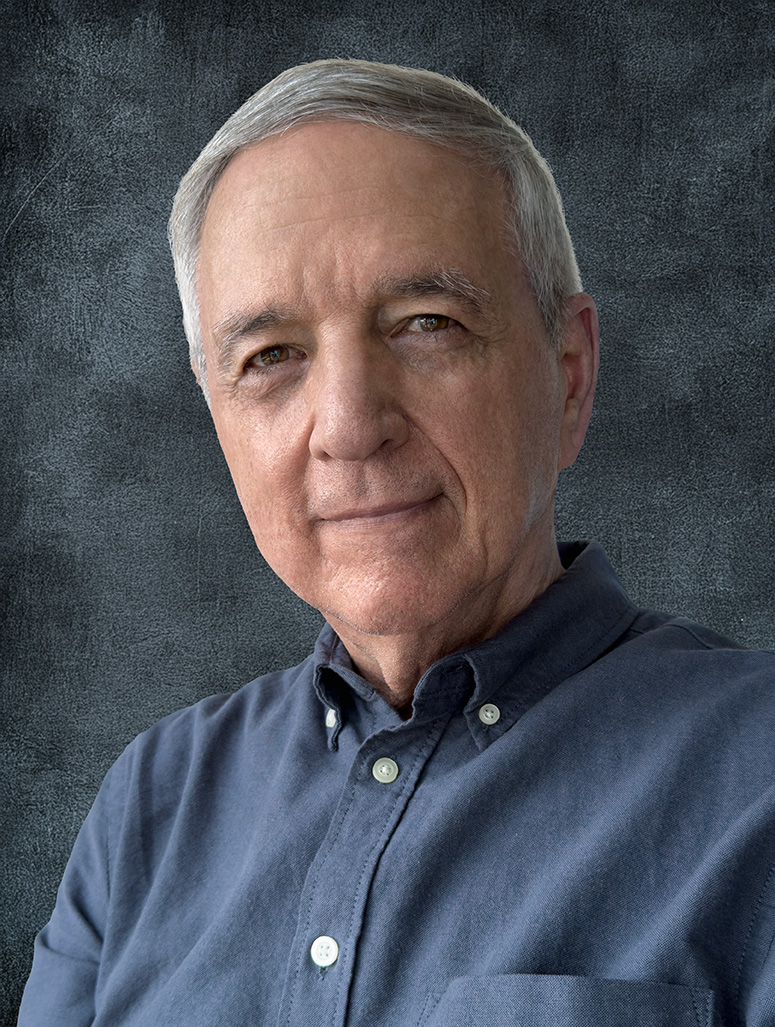
- 2023 portrait of Mike Zeck
- Born: September 6, 1949 (age 77) Greenville, Pennsylvania, U.S.
- Area: Artist
- Notable works: Captain America; Kraven's Last Hunt; Marvel Super-Heroes Secret Wars; Master of Kung-Fu; The Punisher

Michael J. Zeck (born September 6, 1949) is an American comics artist. He is best known for his work for Marvel Comics on such series as Captain America, Marvel Super-Heroes Secret Wars, Master of Kung-Fu, and The Punisher as well as the "Kraven's Last Hunt" storyline in the Spider-Man titles.

== Early life ==
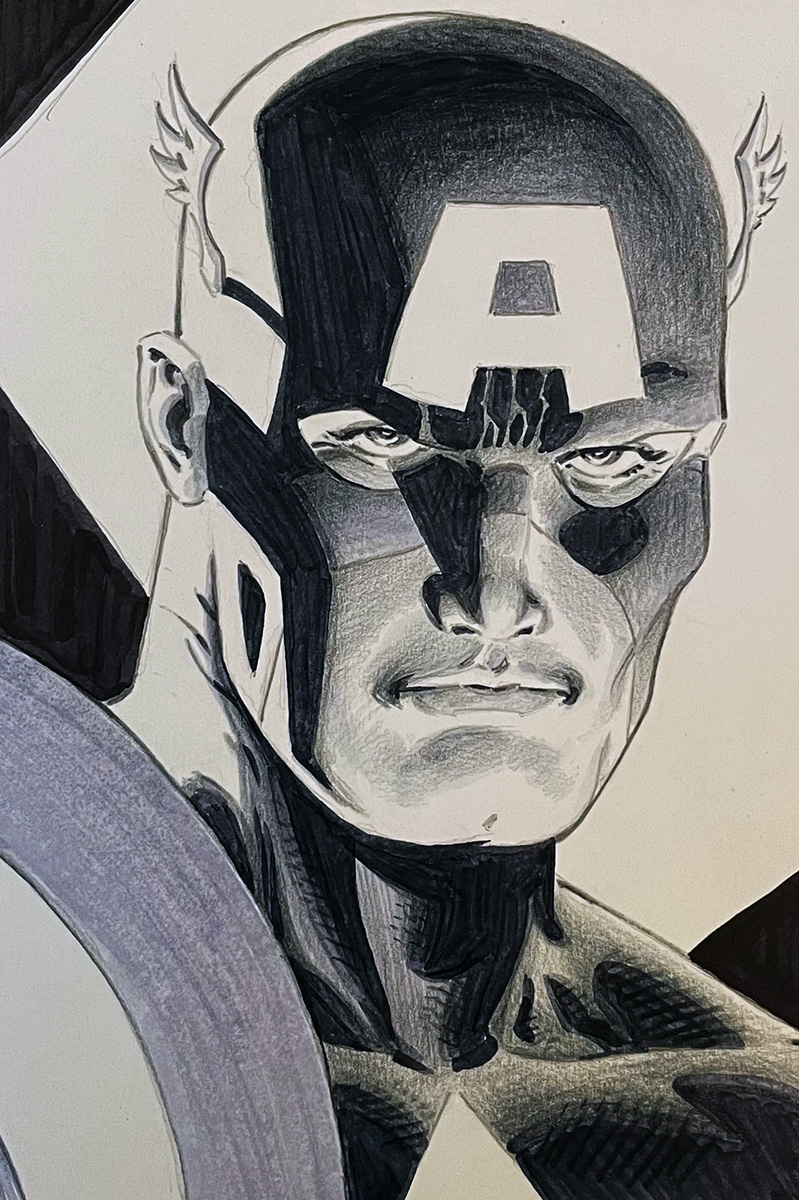
Blank cover sketch art by Mike Zeck

Mike Zeck was born in Greenville, Pennsylvania in 1949. He attended the Ringling School of Art in 1967, and after graduation worked at the Migrant Education Center in Fort Lauderdale, Florida. He is of Serbian ancestry.

== Career ==
Zeck began his comics career in 1974, doing illustration assignments for the text stories in Charlton Comics' animated line of comics, which led to work on their horror titles. During this period he lived briefly in the Derby, Connecticut, area where Charlton was headquartered.

In 1977, Zeck started working for Marvel Comics on Master of Kung Fu with writer Doug Moench. In 2010, Comics Bulletin ranked Moench and Zeck's work on Master of Kung-Fu sixth on its list of the "Top 10 1970s Marvels". Zeck later worked on Captain America and drew covers for G.I. Joe: A Real American Hero.

Zeck illustrated the Marvel Super-Heroes Secret Wars limited series in 1984. For this series, he designed a new black-and-white costume temporarily worn by Spider-Man. The plot that developed as a result of Spider-Man's acquisition of the costume led to the creation of the Spider-Man villain Venom.

In 1986, Zeck collaborated with writer Steven Grant on a Punisher miniseries, which was later collected as The Punisher: Circle Of Blood and an original hardcover graphic novel of the character three years later.

Zeck illustrated the 1987 Spider-Man storyline "Kraven's Last Hunt", written by his former Captain America collaborator J. M. DeMatteis, which is considered to be one of the quintessential stories in Spider-Man's history, as well as the definitive Kraven the Hunter storyline.

DeMatteis remarked, "Because Mike nailed the plot elements so perfectly in his pencils—every action, every emotion, was there, clear as a bell — I didn't have to worry about belaboring those elements in the captions or dialogue. I was free to do those interior monologues that were so important to the story. If any other artist had drawn “Kraven's Last Hunt” ... it wouldn't have been the same story."

In 2004, Zeck's cover of Web of Spider-Man #32, which depicts Spider-Man escaping the grave into which he has been interred by Kraven, was recreated as a 12-inch-tall resin diorama statue by Dynamic Forces.

Zeck has worked for DC Comics as well. He contributed to Who's Who: The Definitive Directory of the DC Universe in the mid-1980s. Zeck drew the covers for the "Ten Nights of the Beast" storyline in Batman #417–420 (March–June 1988) and these covers were later collected in a portfolio. His other credits for the publisher include Batman: Legends of the Dark Knight, Legends of the DC Universe, and covers for Deathstroke, The Terminator. In 1999, he collaborated with writer Mark Waid on The Kingdom (illustrating issue #2, with Ariel Olivetti illustrating issue #1), a sequel to Kingdom Come.

== Later life ==
Mike Zeck at SuperManila Comic Con 2026

Zeck moved to the Philippines in 2022 and now lives in the city of Makati.

An exhibition of Zeck's art was on display at Indiana University Bloomington from April 2025 to February 2026. The art belongs to a private collector whose home was destroyed in the Palisades Fire in January 2025.

== Personal life ==
In 1983 Zeck held the world record for double credit Omega Race, with a score of 2,538,250.

== Bibliography ==
=== Charlton Comics ===
- Creepy Things #2, 4, 6 (cover) (1975)
- The Flintstones #41 (1975)
- Ghost Manor #26, 72 (1975–1984)
- Ghostly Tales #166 (1984)
- Haunted #26, 47, 58, 60 (1976–1982)
- The Many Ghosts of Doctor Graves #56, 59 (1976)
- Monster Hunters #4–7, 9 (1976–1977)
- Scary Tales #2–3, 6, 8–10, 17, 21, 24–26, 41 (1975–1983)
- Thane of Bagarth #24 (1985)

=== DC Comics ===
- Action Comics #600 (1988, one page)
- Batman: Legends of the Dark Knight #0, 69–70 (1994–1995)
- Big Book of Little Criminals (1996)
- Big Book of Weirdos (1995)
- Challengers of the Unknown vol. 3 #16, 18 (1998)
- Detective Comics #600 (1989, one page)
- The Kingdom #2 (1999)
- Legends of the DC Universe #20–21, 80-Page Giant #1 (1998–1999)
- Superman Gallery #1 (1993, one page)
- Superman: The Man of Steel Gallery #1 (1995, one page)
- The Unexpected #221 (1982)
- Who's Who in the Legion of Super-Heroes #6 (1988)
- Who's Who: The Definitive Directory of the DC Universe #1, 18 (1985–1986)

=== Image Comics ===
- Damned #1–4 (1997)

=== Malibu Comics ===
- Eliminator #1–3 (1995)
- Freex #7 (1994)
- Night Man #16 (1995)
- Solution #16 (1995)

=== Marvel Comics ===
- The Amazing Spider-Man #293–294 (1987)
- The Amazing Spider-Man Annual #24 (Sandman back-up story) (1990)
- The Amazing Spider-Man: Soul of the Hunter #1 (1992) (sequel to "Kraven's Last Hunt")
- Captain America #224, 258–259, 261–270, 272–283, 286–289, Annual #8 (1978–1986)
- Captain America vol. 3 #50 (2002)
- Clive Barker's Hellraiser #10 (1991)
- Defenders #130 (1984)
- Epic Graphic Novel: The Punisher – Return to Big Nothing (1989)
- Fantastic Four Roast #1 (1982)
- The Hulk! #16 (1979)
- Logan's Run #6 (Thanos back-up story) (1977)
- Marvel Super-Heroes Secret Wars #1–3, 6–12 (1984–1985)
- Marvel Team-Up #94 (Spider-Man and the Shroud) (1980)
- Master of Kung-Fu #55, 59–60, 64, 66–69, 71–102 (1977–1981)
- Ms. Marvel #22 (1979)
- Official Handbook of the Marvel Universe #2–14 (1983–1984)
- Official Handbook of the Marvel Universe Deluxe Edition #3, 6–7, 9–14, 16, 18–20 (1985–1988)
- Power Man and Iron Fist #51–52 (1978)
- The Punisher #1–5 (1986)
- Savage Sword of Conan #14 (1976)
- Solarman #2 (1990)
- The Spectacular Spider-Man #22, 42–43, 46, 118, 131–132 (1978–1987)
- Spider-Man: Redemption #1–4 (1996)
- Web of Spider-Man #6, 31–32 (1985–1987)

Preceded by Jim Craig	Master of Kung Fu penciller 1977–1981	Succeeded by Gene Day
Preceded by Lee Elias	Captain America penciller 1981–1984	Succeeded by Ron Frenz
