= 1995 in comics =

Notable events of 1995 in comics.

== Events and publication ==
=== Year overall ===
- Publishers Broadway Comics, Tekno Comix, Class Comics, Fantasy Flight Publications, Moonstone Books, A is A, and Ace Comics all debut; WildStorm introduces its Homage Comics imprint; Defiant Comics ceases publishing
- Marvel Comics reintroduces the Amazing Fantasy comic book with #16 with a December 1995 date. It was cancelled with a March 1996 date. All three issues feature Spider-Man.
- Scott Adams is the first U.S. syndicated newspaper cartoonist to make his comic (Dilbert) also available online, as a webcomic, publishing it on his own site.

=== January ===
- After Xavier: The Age of Apocalypse is launched. All X-titles change to different names for the next four months.
- Thor marks his 400th appearance in Marvel Comics with issue #482.
- Silver Surfer vol. 2 #100: by Ron Marz, Joe Phillips, and Tom Grindberg.
- The final issue of the second attempt to launch a Lucky Luke monthly magazine is published.
- Specific date in January unknown: Dutch cartoonist Opland wins the Inktspotprijs for Best Political Cartoon.

=== February ===
- Doom Patrol vol. 2 is canceled by DC Comics with issue #87.

=== March ===
- Jerry Ordway launches The Power of Shazam for DC Comics. The title has a March 1995 cover date.
- Marvel Comics Presents vol. 1 is canceled by Marvel with issue #175.
- March 9: Marvel Comics (through its Fleer subsidiary) buys trading card manufacturer SkyBox International for $150 million.

=== April ===
- The Amazing Spider-Man #400: "A Death In the Family." Die-cut embossed cover. (Marvel Comics).
- April 1: In Sioux City, Iowa Fran and Kevin McGarry found the comics store ACME Comics & Collectibles.
- April 30: DC Comics announces its products will be distributed exclusively by Diamond Comics Distribution, Inc.

=== May ===
- Specific date in May unknown: Nero receives a comics mural in Brussels, as part of the Brussels' Comic Book Route.
- Fantastic Four #400: "Even the Watchers Can Die!" by Tom DeFalco, Paul Ryan, and Dan Bulanadi.
- X-Men: Omega is released and the X-titles revert to their normal continuity.
- Loki makes an appearance in issue #21 of the Malibu Ultraverse title Hard Case.
- Superman (vol. 2) #100: "The Death of Clark Kent," by Dan Jurgens.

=== June ===
- June 5: Dragon Ball Z is concluded, with the end of the Majiin Boo saga.
- Specific date unknown: Suske en Wiske receive a comics mural in Brussels, Belgium, as part of the Brussels' Comic Book Route.

=== July ===
- July 24: Image Comics and Dark Horse Comics announce they will be exclusively distributed by Diamond Comic Distributors.
- Savage Sword of Conan, with issue #235, is cancelled by Marvel.
- Marvel cancels all three Punisher titles due to poor sales:
  - The Punisher vol. 2 (1987 series) is canceled with issue #104 (with The Punisher taking on Bullseye)
  - Punisher War Journal is canceled with issue #80
  - The Punisher War Zone is canceled with issue #41

=== August ===
- Deadline is canceled by Deadline Publications Ltd with issue #70 (Aug./Sept.).
- Johnny the Homicidal Maniac debuts.
- First issue of The Sandman: The wake, by Neil Gaiman and Michael Zulli (DC Comics).

=== September ===
- September 11: In the Danish magazine Anders & co, Plastic Mickey, by Michael T. Gilbert and Cèsar Ferioli Pealez; debut of Doc Static.
- September 17: Suske en Wiske receive a statue in Antwerp, Belgium, located in the Heidestatiestraat.
- Malibu Comics relaunches its Ultraverse titles with the Infinity promotion. The most popular characters, such as Prime, Mantra, Exiles, and Rune, come back with all-black covers and an infinity symbol on the cover.
- Marvel's Marvel Edge imprint debuts, featuring the titles Daredevil, Doctor Strange, Sorcerer Supreme, Ghost Rider, and Incredible Hulk

=== October ===
- October 21–22: During the Stripdagen in Breda, the Netherlands, Wilbert Plijnaar, Robert van der Kroft and Jan van Die, aka De Wiroja's, receive the Stripschapprijs. The magazine Zone 5300 wins the Jaarprijs voor Bijzondere Verdiensten (nowadays the P. Hans Frankfurtherprijs).
- Teenage Mutant Ninja Turtles Adventures is canceled by Archie Comics with issue #72.

=== November ===
- November 4: The final episode of José Miguel Heredia's Perro Mundo is published.
- Marvel launches The Punisher #1 under the Marvel Edge imprint
- Animal Man is canceled by DC Comics with issue #89.

=== December ===
- December 10: Italian comic artist Bonvi (of Sturmtruppen, Cattivik and Nick Carter fame), dies in a car accident, at age 54.
- December 31: The final episode of Bill Watterson's Calvin and Hobbes is published.

== Deaths ==
=== January ===
- January 1: Nans van Leeuwen, Dutch illustrator, novelist and comics artist (Piggelmee), dies at age 94.
- January 5: James S. Burnett, A.K.A. Jim Burnett, American comics writer (Nubbin, Winston), dies at age 73.
- January 12: George Price, American cartoonist (The New Yorker), dies at age 93.
- January 16: Nin, Spanish comics artist (Trompy, El Habitante del Viejo Castillo de Mockery, Don Espino el Buen Vecino, El Monin y sus Gangsters), dies at age 62.
- January 19: Don Tobin, American animator and comics artist (Little Woman), dies at age 79.
- January 24: Frank Emery, American mural artist, jazz musician, photographer, animator, illustrator, and comics artist (4), dies at age 37.
- January 31: Alfredo Cardona Peña, Costa Rican-Mexican novelist and comics writer, dies at age 77.

=== February ===
- February 4: Odette Fumet, Canadian illustrator, novelist and comics artist (newspaper comic strip adaptations of swashbuckler novels), dies at age 94.
- February 11: Sharon Alston, New Zealand comics artist, painter and illustrator (made comics for Broadsheet), dies at age 46 from breast cancer.
- February 13: Bill Perry, American comics artist (Ned Handy, assisted on Harold Teen, continued Gasoline Alley), dies at age 89.
- February 18: Walter Ball, Canadian comics artist (Rural Route), dies at age 83.
- February 19: Paul Jamin, aka Jam, Alfred Gérard and/or Alidor, Belgian comics artist and cartoonist (Le Vol du Bourdon), dies at age 83.
- February 21: Dick Oldden, American cartoonist and comic artist (The Genius), dies at age 63.
- February 23: Don Heck, American comics artist (co-creator of Iron Man, continued Avengers), dies at age 66.
- Specific date unknown: Hugh Morren, British comics artist (Tommy Wack), dies at age 74.

=== March ===
- March 22: Hein Auke Kray, Dutch comics artist (Baas Blaas, de Tielse Kruidenier), dies at age 93.
- March 29: Mort Meskin, American comics artist (DC Comics) dies at age 78.
- March 29: Willy Schermelé, Dutch illustrator and comics artist (Winkie, Bartje en Zwartje, Kater Kwik, Jaap en zijn Aap, Kees en Kikkie, Met z'n Drieën), dies at age 90.
- March 31: Dennis Malcolm Reader, British children's book writer, illustrator and comics artist (Catgirl, Powerman, Electro Girl, Rick Larson, Both 3000, Burt Steele, Wonder Boy, Acromaid, Venus, Phantom Maid, Johnny Wilde, Tim Craig, Dusty Trale), dies at age 68.

=== April ===
- April 19: Reg Wootton, British comics artist (Sporting Sam), died at age 86.
- April 29: Ingrid Wallerström, Swedish novelist, illustrator and comics artist (Taggstraden, Nisse har fått en Trumma), dies at age 102.

=== May ===
- May 5: Ye Qianyu, Chinese comics artist (Mr. Wang), dies at age 88.
- May 18: Bob Uschi, Dutch radio documentary maker, illustrator, sports cartoonist and comic artist (Dom Bom Bassie, Jonas Kwistebiebel), dies at age 84.
- May 26: Friz Freleng, American animator and cartoonist (Looney Tunes, Tweety and Sylvester, Yosemite Sam, The Pink Panther), dies at age 88.

=== June ===
- June 2: Walter Frehm, American comics artist (continued Ripley's Believe It or Not!), dies at age 88 or 89.
- June 5: Raye Horne, American underground comix artist (Gay Hearthrobs, White Whore Funnies), dies at age 50.
- June 26: Bernard Duc, French comic artist (Mystères du Cosmos, Les Baladins, contributed to Le Crime Ne Paie Pas) and author (L'Art de la BD), dies at age 62.

=== July ===
- July 16: Harry Buckinx, Dutch comics artist (Titul, Titula, De Familie Aepebroeck), dies from cancer at age 51.
- July 20: George Caragonne, American comics writer and editor (Marvel Comics, Penthouse Comix), commits suicide at c. age 30.
- July 22: Rick Yager, American comics artist (continued Buck Rogers), dies at age 85.
- July 25: Balthasar Lippisch, German illustrator, caricaturist, animator and comics artist (Pip & Zip), dies at age 74 or 75.

=== August ===
- August 1:
  - Daniel Chauvin, French comics artist (assisted on Tanguy et Laverdure and Buck Danny), dies at age 56 from stomach cancer.
  - Noel Gloesner, French comics artist (Les Indégonflables de Chantovent, Yann le Vaillant), dies at age 77.
- August 5: Bert Peleman, Belgian poet, novelist, painter and comic writer (Peerke Sorgeloos and Bert, De Lustige Trekker, drawn by Willy Vandersteen), dies at age 80.
- August 9: Stef Vanstiphout, Belgian illustrator and comic artist (Puk de Nar, Ragebol), dies at age 64.
- August 20: Hugo Pratt, Italian comics artist (Corto Maltese, El Sargento Kirk, Ernie Pike, Jesuit Joe, Asso di Picche), dies at age 68.

=== September ===
- September 7: Russell Johnson, American comics artist (Mister Oswald), dies at age 101.
- September 9:
  - Toon Rammelt, Dutch comics artist, illustrator and radio executive (De Vliegvarobiel van Professor Knap, Sikkie en Dikkie en de Reis naar Luilekkerland, Hummel, Lummel en hun avonturen met de houten doos, De Stakelijers, Eduard), dies at age 84.
  - Pim van Boxsel, Dutch illustrator and comics artist (Cartouche, De Wonderlijke Avonturen van Philomene), dies at age 71 from heart failure.
- September 13: Walter Goetz, German-British comics artist and illustrator (Colonel Up and Mr. Down, Dab and Flounder), dies at age 83.
- September 21: Carl Hollander, Dutch children's book illustrator and comic artist (Rosie Geur en Manus Gein, Daantje Doedel), dies at age 61.
- September 30: Nestor Redondo, Filipino comics artist (DC Comics, Marvel Comics), dies at age 67.

=== October ===
- October 2:
  - John Belfi, American comic artist (assisted on comics based on The Saint, drew Straight Arrow) and inker (Tarzan, Flash Gordon, Dan Flagg), drew comics for Quality Comics, Charlton Comics, Lev Gleason,...), dies at age 71.
  - October 2: Georges Langlais, A.K.A. Gal, French illustrator and comic artist (drew historical comics, among others for L'Oncle Paul), dies at age 80.
- October 16: Miguel Angel Nieto Ventura, Spanish comics writer (Grouñidos en El Desierto), dies at age 47 or 48.
- October 21: Jesús Blasco, Spanish comics artist and writer (Cuto, Capitán Trueno), dies at age 75.
- October 21: Manuel Vázquez Gallego, Spanish comics artist (Las hermanas Gilda, La familia Cebolleta, Anacleto, agente secreto), dies at age 65 from a stroke.
- October 30: Patrick Nicolle, British comics artist (made comics for Amalgamated Press, Fleetway Press and IPC), dies at age 97.

=== November ===
- November 1: Floriano Bozzi, A.K.A. Sam Göspel, Italian comics artist (Auranella, Bernada, Jessica, Leonardo), dies at age 69.
- November 2: Ollie Harrington, American comics artist (Dark Laughter), dies at age 83 in Berlin, Germany.

=== December ===
- December 1: Jack Alderman, Canadian-American comics artist (drew stories for Fiction House, Ace Periodicals, Fawcett Comics, Better Publications, Timely Comics, Charlton Comics,...), dies at age 74.
- December 4: Petar Gligorovski, Macedonian painter, comics artist, animator and animated film director (Adam 5 do 12), dies at age 57.
- December 5: L. B. Cole, American comics artist (Contact Comics, Captain Flight Comics), dies at age 77.
- December 9: Elsie Hix, American comic writer (continued Strange as It Seems), dies at age 93.
- December 10:
  - Bonvi, Italian comics writer and artist (Sturmtruppen, Cattivik, Nick Carter, Marzolino Tarantola), dies at age 54.
  - Ganes T.H., Indonesian comics artist (Si Buta dari Gua Hantu), dies at age 60.
- December 13: Mentis Bostantzoglou, aka Bost, Greek illustrator, playwright, lyricist, painter and comics artist (worked on Classics Illustrated), dies at age 76 or 77.
- December 15: Willy Smit, Dutch comics artist (Tijs Wijs de Torenwachter), dies at age 94.

=== Specific date unknown ===
- Benigani, Spanish comics artist, dies at age 92 or 93.
- Alex Cubie, Scottish comics artist and animator (continued Rupert Bear), dies at age 83 or 84.
- José De Lemos, Portuguese comics artist, dies at age 85.
- Egidio Gherlizza, Italian comics artist (Signor Giulivo), dies at age 85 or 86.
- Robert Gring, French illustrator and comic artist, dies at age 72 or 73.
- Óskar, aka Oskar Pinto Lobo, Portuguese comics artist (Tom Migas e o seu cavalo Cara Linda, comics about Laurel & Hardy), dies at age 81 or 82.
- Wies Peleman, Belgian comics artist (Meneer Kommix & Strip, Pim en Pom in de Zoo, Prietpraat Ballon, Adam and Zee), dies at age 72 or 73.
- Don Tobin, American animator and comics artist (Little Woman), dies at age 78 or 79.
- Desmond Walduck, British comic artist (worked on Dan Dare), dies at age 74 or 75.
- Roberto Wilson, Canadian comic artist (Robert et Roland, Le Passion de Notre Seigneur Jésus), dies at age 66 or 67.
- Malek Zirout, Algerian comic artist (La Route du Sel), dies at age 61 or 62.

== Exhibitions ==
- July 30–August 27: (Columbus Recreation and Parks Department Cultural Arts Center, Columbus, Ohio): "Anything Can Happen in a Comic Strip: Centennial Reflections on an American Art Form"
- August 1–October 27: (Ohio State University Cartoon, Graphic, and Photographic Arts Research Library, Columbus, Ohio): "See You in the Funny Papers: American Life as Reflected in the Newspaper Comic Strip," curated by Lucy Shelton Caswell, in conjunction with the Festival of Cartoon Art
- August 24–October 14: (Martin Luther King Jr. Complex for Performing and Cultural Arts, Ohio State University, Columbus, Ohio): "Sequential Art: The Next Step", curated by Robert Stull; the work of young, mostly African American, cartoonists Darrell Gates, Grey, Hannibal King, Louis Small, Jr., Jeff Smith, and Stull; in conjunction with the Festival of Cartoon Art. Later traveled to the National Center of Afro-American Artists in Boston; the Words & Pictures Museum in Northampton, MA; the Afro-American Cultural Center in Charlotte, NC; and the Tubman Museum in Macon, GA.
- December 2, 1995 – January 27, 1996 (Exit Art, New York City) : "Imaginary Beings" — artists include Sue de Beer, Judy Fox, Shirin Neshat, Tom Otterness, Roxy Paine, S. Clay Wilson
- December 7, 1995 – February 11, 1996 (Words & Pictures Museum, Northampton, Massachusetts): "Classic Comics — A Selection of Stories from EC Comics," featuring the work of, among others, John Severin

== Conventions ==
- January 15: Albuquerque Comic Con (Albuquerque Marriott, Albuquerque, New Mexico) — guests include Sheldon Moldoff and Tom Grindberg
- January 22: Great Eastern Conventions Boston (57 Park Plaza, Boston, Massachusetts) — c. 750 attendees
- January 26–29: Angoulême International Comics Festival (Angoulême, France) — 22nd annual festival
- February 19: Spirits of Independence (Austin, Texas) — featuring organizers Dave Sim and Gerhard, and Martin Wagner
- February 24–26: The New York Comic Book Spectacular (Jacob K. Javits Convention Center, New York City)
- Spring: MegaCon (Orlando, Florida) — guests include Gil Kane, Dick Giordano, and Howard Chaykin
- March: Motor City Comic Con I
- March 25: Spirits of Independence (Hyatt Downtown, Columbus, OH) — guests include Dave Sim and Gerhard, Paul Pope, Steve Bissette, and M'Oak
- April: Pittsburgh Comicon (Monroeville, Pennsylvania)
- April 15–16: Dallas Fantasy Fair I (Harvey Hotel, Irving, Texas) — guests include Adam Hughes, Susie Owens, and Mark Goddard
- April 15: Spirits of Independence (Seattle, Washington) — featuring organizers Dave Sim and Gerhard, and Drew Hayes
- April 21–23: WonderCon (Oakland, California) — held in conjunction with Pro/Con
- May 19: Alternative Press Expo (San Jose, California)
- Summer: CAPTION (Oxford Union Society, Oxford, England)
- June 23–25: Atlanta Fantasy Fair (Castlegate Hotel, Atlanta, Georgia) — final iteration of this show; official guests include Claudia Christian, Dirk Benedict, Dwight Schultz, Jeff Pittarelli, Don Hillsman II, Wayne Vansant, Joe Phillips
- June 23: Small Press Expo (Bethesda, Maryland) — second annual show; exhibitors include David Lapham, David Mazzucchelli, Dave Sim, Gerhard, Bebe Williams, Mark Wheatley, Marc Hempel, and Greg Hyland
- June 30–July 2: Chicago Comicon (Rosemont Convention Center, Rosemont, Illinois) — 20,000 attendees; guest of honor: Peter David; special guests: Sal Buscema, Roy Thomas, John Romita Sr., Chris Claremont, Jim Shooter, and Julius Schwartz
- July: Heroes Convention (Charlotte Convention Center, Charlotte, North Carolina) — special guest: Todd McFarlane
- July 1: Spirits of Independence (Manchester, Vermont) — featuring organizers Dave Sim and Gerhard, and Stephen R. Bissette
- July 13–16: Dragon Con/International Starfleet Conference (Atlanta Hilton & Towers, Westin Peachtree Plaza Hotel & Atlanta Civic Center, Atlanta, Georgia) — 14,312 attendees; guests of honor: George Alec Effinger, Harlan Ellison, Timothy Zahn, Michael Whelan, and Bjo Trimble
- July 27–30: Comic-Con International (San Diego Convention Center, San Diego, California) — 34,000 attendees; special guests include Mike Baron, Simon Bisley, Charles Burns, Alan Davis, Ramona Fradon, Neil Gaiman, James Gurney, Greg Hildebrandt, Tim Hildebrandt, Ryoichi Ikegami, Gil Kane, Stan Lee, Irv Novick, Harvey Pekar, Stan Sakai, Joe Sinnott, Tom Sito, Jeff Smith, and Andrew Vachss. Comic-Con officially changes its name to Comic-Con International, and introduces its new "eye" logo designed by Richard Bruning
- August 12: Spirits—Chicago Independent Comics Expo (I.C.E.) (Radisson Suites Hotel O'Hare, Rosemont, IL) — guests include Jessica Abel, Stephen R. Bissette, Joe Chiappetta, Evan Dorkin, Sarah Dyer, Matt Feazell, Troy Hickman, David Lapham, Larry Marder, Mark Oakley, Paul Pope, Alex Robinson, Andrew Robinson, Dave Sim & Gerhard, Jim Valentino, and Joe Zabel
- August 11–13: Dallas Fantasy Fair II (Dallas Market Hall Convention Center, Dallas, Texas) — presentation of the Harvey Awards; keynote speaker and master-of-ceremonies: Jim Starlin; official guests include Sergio Aragonés, Kurt Busiek, Rob Liefeld, Terry Moore, David W. Mack, Martin Nodell, Julius Schwartz, Mark Schultz, Jeff Smith, William Stout, Chris Ware, Al Williamson, and Jim Woodring
- August 12–13: Canadian National Comic Book Exposition, (Metro Toronto Convention Centre, Roy Thomson Hall, Toronto, Ontario, Canada) — c. 1400 attendees; guests include J. Scott Campbell, Kelley Jones, Joe Jusko, Bill Sienkiewicz, Bernie Wrightson, Brian Hotton, Stephen Platt, Ken Lashley, and Ty Templeton
- August 25–26: Festival of Cartoon Art (Ohio State University, Columbus, Ohio) — 5th edition; official guests include Garry Trudeau, Jeff MacNelly, Lynn Johnston, Bill Amend, Robb Armstrong, Stephen Bentley, Bruce Beattie, and Bill Griffith
- September 9–10: Great Eastern Conventions New York II (Jacob K. Javits Convention Center, New York City)
- September 9: Spirits of Independence (Pittsburgh, Pennsylvania) — featuring organizers Dave Sim and Gerhard, Don Simpson, and Billy Tucci
- October 7–8: Motor City Comic Con II (Dearborn Civic Center)
- October 7: Spirits of Independence (Phoenix, Arizona) — featuring organizers Dave Sim and Gerhard, and James A. Owen
- November 4: Spirits of Independence (Kitchener, Ontario) — featuring organizers Dave Sim and Gerhard
- November 25–26: Dallas Fantasy Fair III (Harvey Hotel, Irving, Texas) — guests include Julie Newmar
- November 25–26: Mid-Ohio Con (Columbus Ohio) — Special guest: Barry Windsor-Smith; other guests: Mark Evanier, Roger Stern, William Messner-Loebs, John Byrne, Sergio Aragonés, Brian Michael Bendis, Martin Egeland, Dick Giordano, David Mack, Joe Pruett, Beau Smith, Jim Shooter, Jeff Smith, and Bernie Wrightson

== First issues by title ==
=== DC Comics ===
- Power of Shazam
- Sovereign Seven

=== Delcourt ===
- De cape et de crocs

=== Malibu Ultraverse ===
- Godwheel

=== Marvel Comics ===
- Amazing X-Men
- Astonishing X-Men
- Avengers: The Crossing
- Gambit and the X-Ternals
- Generation Next
- Prime
- Skrull Kill Crew
- Weapon X
- X-Calibre
- X-Men: Omega

=== Vertigo Comics ===
- Preacher

=== Independent ===
- Astro City (as Kurt Busiek's Astro City)
- Dark Town by Mad Monkey Press Writer:Kaja Blackley Artist: Vanessa Chong
- Stray Bullets (by Él Capitan)
