= J. G. Jones =

American comic book artist

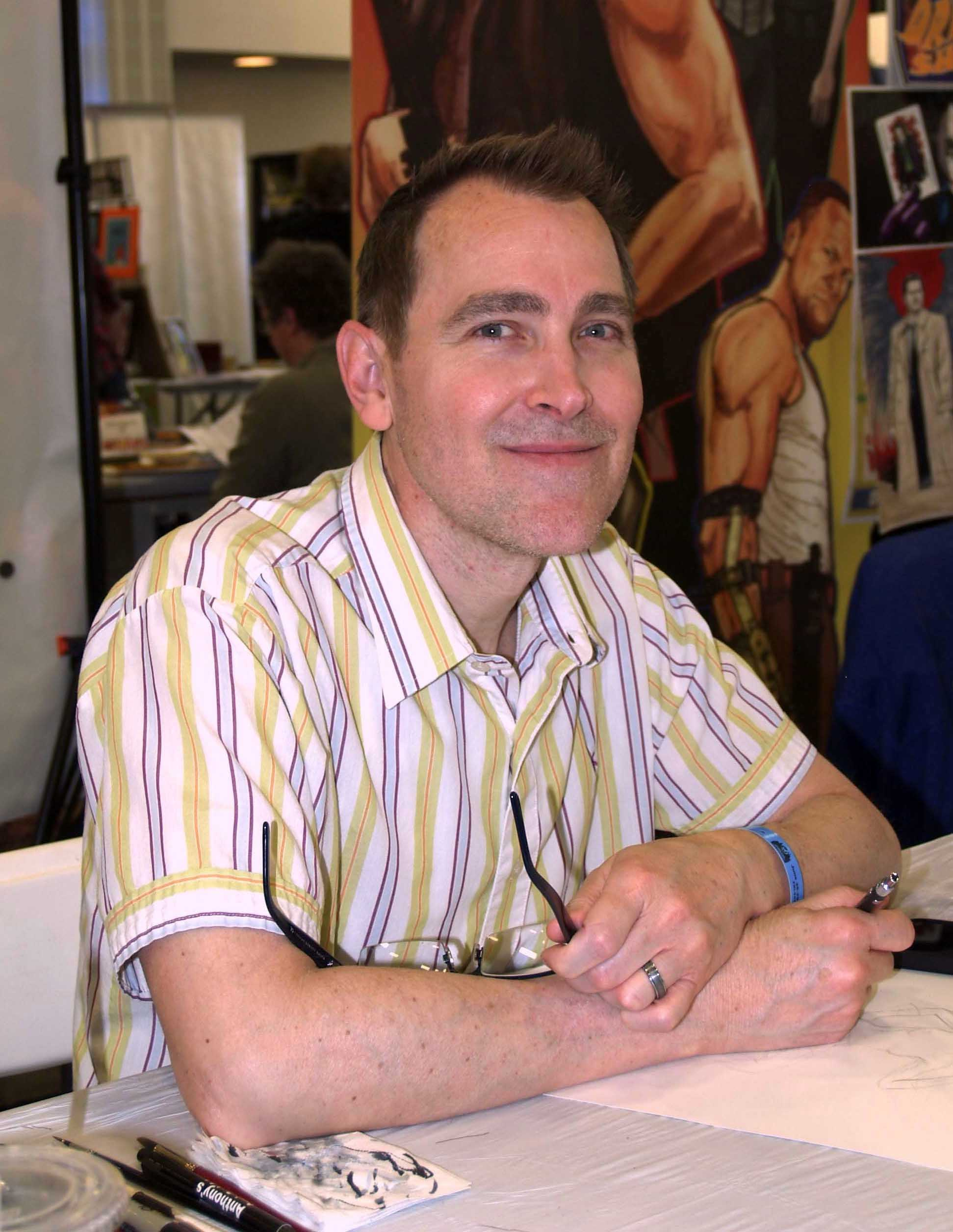
- Jones at the 2013 Wizard World New York Experience in Manhattan
- Areas: Penciller, Inker
- Notable works: 52 (covers); Final Crisis; Marvel Boy; Wanted
- Awards: 2006 Cover Artist of the Year (Wizard)

Jeffrey Glen Jones is an American comics artist who is known for his work on titles such as Wanted and Final Crisis.

== Early life ==
Jones hails from Walker, Louisiana and attended Louisiana State University and the University at Albany, SUNY where he received his Master of Fine Arts degree.

== Career ==
J. G. Jones made his debut in the comics industry in 1994 by drawing Dark Dominion for Defiant Comics. He is best known for his work as cover artist on various comic book series, including a stint on Brian K. Vaughan's Y: The Last Man and for DC Comics, the six-issue limited series Villains United written by Gail Simone, as well as all 52 covers for the maxi-series 52.

In 1999, Jones and writer Devin K. Grayson introduced the Yelena Belova character in the Black Widow limited series. The following year, Jones worked with writer Grant Morrison on the Marvel Boy limited series. Jones' other interior art credits include Wonder Woman: The Hiketeia written by Greg Rucka and Mark Millar's Wanted published by Top Cow Productions.

Jones was intended to be the sole artist on the Grant Morrison DC limited series Final Crisis. Due to delays, Jones was assisted by artists Carlos Pacheco, Marco Rudy, and Doug Mahnke for issues #4–6, and replaced for issue #7 by Mahnke. Jones noted that "Any problems completing the series are my own. I love Doug Mahnke's art, and he would have probably been a better choice to draw this series in the first place."

Since then Jones has been mostly providing covers for DC Comics on titles such as Batman and Robin, Doc Savage, Frankenstein, Agent of S.H.A.D.E. and Mister Terrific. Writer Brian Azzarello and Jones collaborated on the Before Watchmen: Comedian limited series in 2012–2013. Jones and writer Mark Waid produced Strange Fruit for Boom! Studios in July 2015.

== Bibliography ==
=== Interior work ===
- Dark Dominion #7–9: "Once a Hero!" (with Len Wein, Defiant Comics, 1994)
- Rant #1–2 (with Jonathan Larsen, Boneyard Press, 1994–1995)
- Fatale (with Jim Shooter and Jay Jay Jackson, Broadway Comics):
  - "Fatale" (in Powers That Be #1, 1995)
  - "Inherit the Earth" (in Fatale #1–6, 1996)
- Shi: Rekishi #1–2 (with Christopher Golden, Crusade Comics, 1997)
- Tomoe: Unforgettable Fire: "The Face You Had Before You Were Born" (with Tony Bedard, one-shot, Crusade Comics, 1997)
- Shi: The Series #1–3, 5 (with Tony Bedard, Crusade Comics, 1997)
- Shi: Black, White and Red #1–2 (with Thomas E. Sniegoski, Crusade Comics, 1998)
- Painkiller Jane/Darkchylde: "Lost in a Dream" (with Brian Augustyn, one-shot, Event Comics, 1998)
- Black Widow #1–3: "The Itsy-Bitsy Spider" (with Devin K. Grayson, Marvel Comics, 1999)
- Webspinners: Tales of Spider-Man #12: "Perchance to Dream" (with Paul Jenkins, Marvel Comics, 1999)
- Marvel Boy #1–6 (with Grant Morrison, Marvel Comics, 2000–2001)
- Wonder Woman: The Hiketeia (with Greg Rucka, graphic novel, DC Comics, 2002)
- Wanted (with Mark Millar, Top Cow, 2003–2005)
- The Avengers #503 (with Brian Michael Bendis, among other artists, Marvel Comics, 2004)
- 52 #16: "The Origin of Black Adam" (with Mark Waid, co-feature, DC Comics, 2006)
- Final Crisis #1–6 (with Grant Morrison, Carlos Pacheco, and Doug Mahnke, DC Comics, 2008–2009)
- DC Universe: Legacies #1: "Snapshot: Reflection!" (with Len Wein, co-feature, DC Comics, 2010)
- Doc Savage #13–17 (script, with Qing Ping Mui (artist), DC Comics, 2011)
- Before Watchmen: Comedian #1–6 (with Brian Azzarello, DC Comics, 2012–2013)
- Batman Black and White vol. 2 #2 (with Dan DiDio, DC Comics, 2013)
- Strange Fruit #1–4 (with Mark Waid, Boom! Studios, 2015)
- Captain America #701 (with Mark Waid, Marvel Comics 2018)

=== Covers only ===
- Shi: The Series #4, 6 (Crusade Comics, 1997–1998)
- Warlock #1 (Marvel Comics, 1999)
- Peter Parker: Spider-Man Annual '99 (Marvel Comics, 1999)
- Aria/Angela #1 (Image Comics, 2000)
- Gatecrasher: Ring of Fire #1–2 (Black Bull Comics, 2000)
- Weather Woman #1 (CPM Manga, 2000)
- Wildcats #13–17 (WildStorm, 2000–2001)
- Just a Pilgrim #1 (Black Bull Comics, 2001)
- Birds of Prey #31 (DC Comics, 2001)
- Transmetropolitan #46–48 (Vertigo, 2001)
- Codename: Knockout #3, 15–23 (Vertigo, 2001–2003)
- Nightwing #59, 125 (DC Comics, 2001–2006)
- Superboy #94 (DC Comics, 2002)
- Just a Pilgrim: Garden of Eden #2 (Black Bull Comics, 2002)
- Y: The Last Man #1–17 (Vertigo, 2002–2004)
- The Resistance #1 (WildStorm, 2002)
- Catwoman vol. 3 #12–16 (DC Comics, 2002–2003)
- Captain Marvel #5 (Marvel Comics, 2003)
- Captain America: What Price Glory? #2 (Marvel Comics, 2003)
- The Avengers vol. 3 #65–71 (Marvel Comics, 2003)
- Wonder Woman vol. 2 #200–203, 205–210, 212–213, 215–226 (DC Comics, 2004–2006)
- Red Sonja #2, 14 (Dynamite Entertainment, 2005–2006)
- Serenity #1 (Dark Horse Comics, 2005)
- Villains United #1–6 (DC Comics, 2005)
- Army of Darkness vs. Re-Animator #1 (Dynamite Entertainment, 2005)
- Helios: In with the New #1 (Speakeasy Comics, 2005)
- Captain Atom: Armageddon #2, 5, 8 (WildStorm, 2006)
- 52 #1–52 (DC Comics, 2006–2007)
- Savage Dragon #128 (Image Comics, 2006)
- Snakes on a Plane #1 (WildStorm, 2006)
- Deathblow #2 (WildStorm, 2007)
- Justice League of America #4 (DC Comics, 2007)
- Countdown to Final Crisis #23, 35 (DC Comics, 2007)
- Potter's Field #1 (Boom! Studios, 2007)
- Supernatural: Origins #6 (WildStorm, 2007)
- Final Crisis: Requiem #1 (DC Comics, 2008)
- Final Crisis #7 (DC Comics, 2009)
- Batman #687 (DC Comics, 2009)
- Batman and Robin #1, 22–26 (DC Comics, 2009–2011)
- Batman: Streets of Gotham #1 (DC Comics, 2009)
- Detective Comics #854 (DC Comics, 2009)
- Gotham City Sirens #1 (DC Comics, 2009)
- Red Robin #1 (DC Comics, 2009)
- The Outsiders #19 (DC Comics, 2009)
- The Shield #1 (DC Comics, 2009)
- The Web #1 (DC Comics, 2009)
- Batman/Doc Savage Special #1 (DC Comics, 2009)
- First Wave #1–6 (DC Comics, 2010–2011)
- Doc Savage #1–12 (DC Comics, 2010–2011)
- Gen^{13} #37 (WildStorm, 2010)
- First Wave Special #1 (DC Comics, 2011)
- Brightest Day Aftermath: The Search #1 (DC Comics, 2011)
- Green Lantern #67 (DC Comics, 2011)
- Flashpoint: Hal Jordan #3 (DC Comics, 2011)
- Frankenstein, Agent of S.H.A.D.E. #1–7 (DC Comics, 2011–2012)
- Mister Terrific #1–8 (DC Comics, 2011–2012)

== Awards and nominations ==
- 2025: Winner of the Inkpot Award at San Diego Comic Con 2025
- 2006: Nominated for "Best Cover Artist" Eisner Award, for Codename: Knockout and Transmetropolitan
- 2006: Nominated for "Best Penciller/Inker" Eisner Award, for Wanted
