= Prudence & Caution =

Publication information
- Publisher: Defiant Comics
- First appearance: Prudence: Warriors of Plasm #5; December 1993; Rick Teitz: Warriors of Plasm #1; August 1993
- Created by: Jim Shooter

In-story information
- Alter ego: Prudence / Rick Teitz
- Team affiliations: Warriors of Plasm
- Abilities: Prudence: Super agility, speed and strength / Rick: Super strength and near-invulnerability

Prudence & Caution is a comic book series that was published by Defiant Comics in 1994. Only two issues were published, during the months of May and June respectively, before Defiant ceased publication of the series.

== Publication history ==
Several issues of Prudence & Caution were solicited to vendors throughout the summer of 1994. Because of this, several other issues were rumored to be in existence. Some online vendors have listings for Prudence & Caution issues #3, 4, 5 and 6. All of those titles are listed as "out of stock", but the comics were never published, although they were advertised and solicited for pre-orders to comic shops and vendors around the country. Therefore, the only two issues of Prudence & Caution in existence are issues #1 and 2.

== Overview ==
Both of the eponymous main characters were created by Defiant's editor-in-chief, Jim Shooter. Prudence originally made her debut in Warriors of Plasm #5, and Rick (Caution) in Warriors of Plasm #1. Together they presented something of an odd couple with their charm and humor, and since the pair made such an unlikely duo, their contrasting personalities made for interesting stories. Shooter had previously created two successful characters in the same vein as Prudence and Caution, a pair called Archer & Armstrong, while he was employed by Valiant Comics a few years earlier.

Although the characters were created by Shooter, the comic itself was written by Chris Claremont, best known for his work on Marvel Comics' X-Men title. Shooter and Claremont had worked together previously at Marvel, where Shooter was the editor-in-chief of the company from 1978 to 1987.

Artist Jim Fern, who had a rather quirky, off-beat type style, helped to add to the overall look and feel of these stories.

Due to low sales in the comic book industry at the time, as well as Defiant's lack of funds, only two issues of Prudence & Caution were actually published. Jim Shooter expressed an interest in re-visiting the characters and story in the future.

The characters are currently the property of Golden Books.
