= D. G. Chichester =

American comic book writer

D.G. Chichester
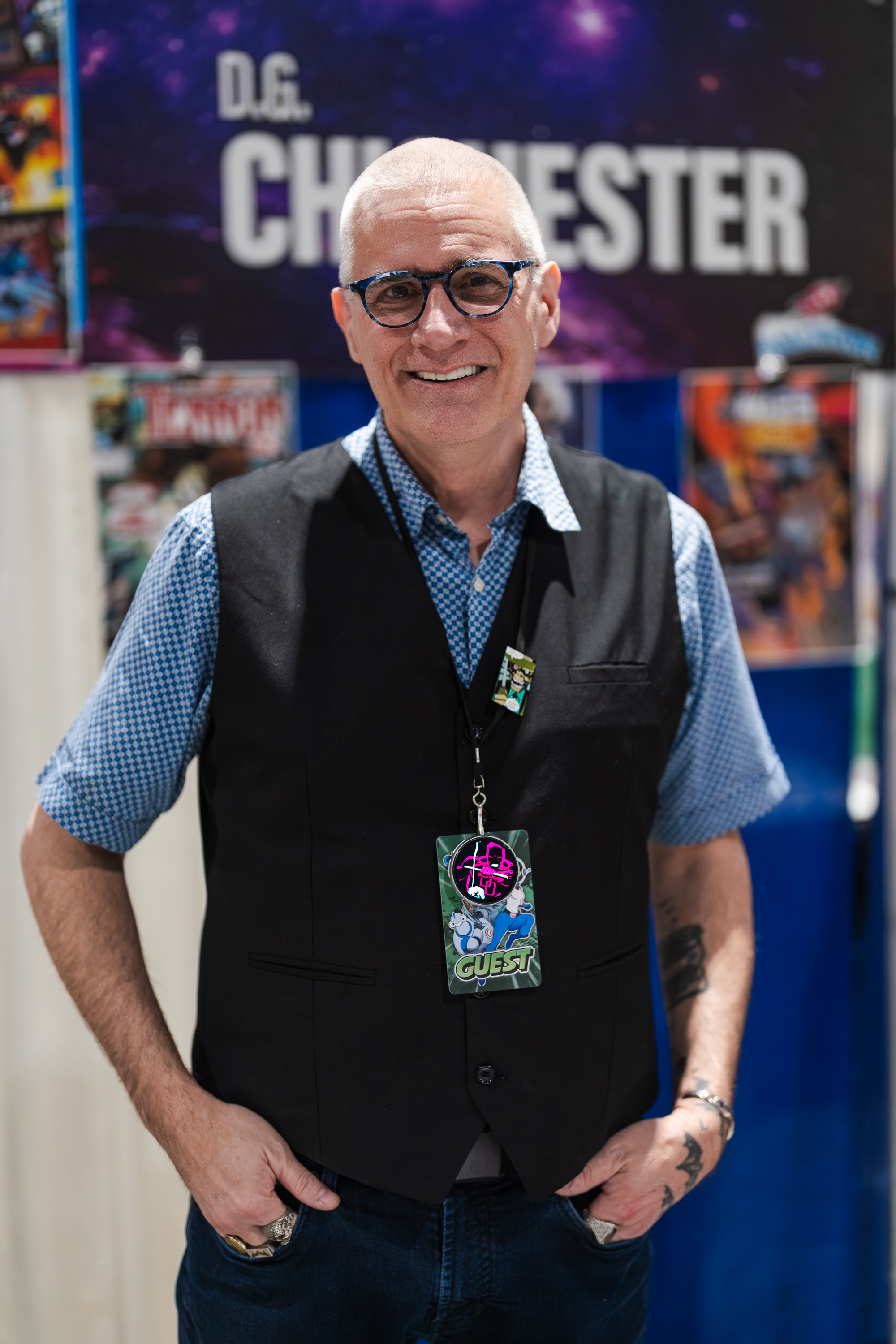
- Chichester at GalaxyCon Richmond in 2026
- Born: Daniel G. Chichester; August 22, 1964 (age 62) Connecticut, U.S.
- Areas: Writer, Editor
- Notable works: Daredevil; Terror Inc.

Daniel G. Chichester (born August 22, 1964) is an American comic book writer. His credits include Daredevil and Nick Fury: Agent of S.H.I.E.L.D. for Marvel Comics.

== Career ==
D. G. Chichester was born in Connecticut, and studied filmmaking at New York University. In his junior year, after running through cash reserves on his narrative student film, he took a job as assistant to the assistant of editor in chief Jim Shooter. This led to an editorial job at the Marvel Comics imprint Epic Comics following his graduation. Working as an assistant editor from 1985 to 1986, he was promoted to editor in 1987. Chichester worked in that capacity at Epic until 1989. He left Marvel's staff that year to pursue freelance writing and editing full-time.

Beginning in 1987, Chichester added to his editorial role and began writing comics for Marvel — and, after leaving staff, for other publishers. His credits include Nick Fury: Agent of S.H.I.E.L.D. in 1990–1992, and Nightstalkers in 1992–1993. He had a long run on Daredevil from 1991 to 1995, where he scripted the "Fall of the Kingpin" and "Fall From Grace" story arcs. Additional freelance credits from this period include Charlemagne #1–5 for Defiant Comics and Motorhead #1–6 for Dark Horse Comics.

In early 1995, while in the midst of developing upcoming story lines for Daredevil, he learned he was to be replaced by group editor Bobbie Chase as the title's writer. For the five issues of the comic he was obligated to write he took his name off the credits, instead demanding an "Alan Smithee" credit (an official pseudonym used by film directors who wish to disown a project). Despite being fired from the title, Chichester was later chosen to write the 1997 Daredevil/Batman: Eye for an Eye intercompany crossover.

Chichester had no major comics writing credits from 1999 to 2023. His hiatus from comics began the same year he joined the advertising agency Ogilvy & Mather as an associate creative director. His latest staff role was as Chief Experience Officer (CXO) for the Ogilvy Health division of Ogilvy & Mather, based in both New York City and Parsippany, New Jersey. Since then he has worked as a contract writer and consultant for a variety of marketing clients.

In 2023 he wrote Daredevil: Black Armor, a mini-series set during his time as the author of the original series when Daredevil wore an armored costume designed by the former supervillain the Gladiator / Melvin Potter. One critic wrote, "With age and experience now under his belt, Chichester did the impossible. He had me falling in love with a part of Daredevil’s history that I could barely stand." Another critic said, "Chichester has grown as a writer, embracing the “less is more” idea when it comes to character thoughts. Thought boxes are tighter and more focused, making it cleaner for the art to shine through, which Netho Diaz does," and called it "an entertaining adventure that uses nostalgia to get readers to return with enough hype that newer fans will want to check out this throwback suit. D.G. Chichester and Netho Diaz give us the best of the past and present with their modern-style trip to a memorable era in Daredevil."

He also wrote the story "Hurts So Good" in Daredevil #8/#670 (June 2024) In 2025 he wrote the Blackbox Comics miniseries Rysk, a cyber-adventure.

He lives in Connecticut with his wife and son, continuing to experiment with moviemaking and animation.

== Bibliography ==
=== Acclaim Comics ===
- Bloodshot #11–12 (1998)
- Homelands on the World of Magic: the Gathering (Armada, 1996)
- Sliders #1–3 (1996-1997)
- Sliders: Darkest Hour #1–3 (1996)
- Sliders: Ultimatum #1–2 (1996)

=== Dark Horse Comics ===
- Dark Horse Presents #139–140 (1999)
- King Tiger & Motorhead #1–2 (1996)
- Motorhead #1–6 (1995–1996)

=== DC Comics ===
- Batman 80-Page Giant #2 (1999)
- Judge Dredd #13–15 (1995)
- Judge Dredd: Legends of the Law #5–7 (1995)

==== Milestone Media ====
- Blood Syndicate #31–32 (1995)
- Hardware #45–50 (1996–1997)
- Long, Hot Summer #1–3 (1995)

=== Defiant Comics ===
- Charlemagne #1–5 (1994)

=== First Comics ===
- Moby Dick (1990)

=== Harvey/Nemesis Comics ===
- Frank #1-4 (1994)
- seaQuest #1 (1994)

=== Marvel Comics ===
- Blood and Glory: Punisher/Captain America #1–3 (1992)
- Daredevil #292–309, #312–332, #338–342, #380 (1991–1998)
- Daredevil: Black Armor #1–4 (2024)
- Elektra: Root of Evil #1–4 (1995)
- Justice #12 (1987)
- Marvel Super Heroes vol. 2 #1–2 (1990)
- Midnight Sons Unlimited #1, 4 (1993–1994)
- Nick Fury: Agent of S.H.I.E.L.D. #7–10, 15–23, 25–31 (1990–1992)
- Nightstalkers #1–11 (1992–1993)
- Punisher/Black Widow: Spinning Doomsday's Web (graphic novel, 1992)
- Punisher Annual #4 (1991)
- Solo Avengers #10 (1988)
- Spider-Man storyline #15: Doom Control (Marvel CyberComics, 1998)
- Terror Inc. #1–13 (1992–1993)
- West Coast Avengers #38 (1988)
- What If...? vol. 2 #73 (1995)
- Wolverine #58–59 (1992)

==== Epic Comics ====
- Clive Barker's Hellraiser #5–16, 19, Summer Special #1 (1990–1992)
- Doctor Zero #1–7 (1988–1989)
- Hellraiser Nightbreed-Jihad #1–2 (1991)
- Powerline #1–8 (1988–1989)
- St. George #1–8 (1988–1989)
- Shadowline Saga: Critical Mass #1–7 (1990)

==== Marvel Comics and DC Comics ====
- Assassins #1 (Amalgam Comics, 1996)
- Daredevil/Batman: Eye for an Eye #1 (1997)

| Preceded by Ann Nocenti | Daredevil writer 1991–1995 | Succeeded by J. M. DeMatteis |
| Preceded by Scott Lobdell | Daredevil writer 1998 | Succeeded by Kevin Smith |
