= Stray Bullets (comics) =

American comic book series

- Cover of Stray Bullets #1 (1995) by David Lapham

Publication information
- Publisher: El Capitan Books; Image Comics
- Schedule: Irregular
- Format: Ongoing series
- Genre: Crime
- Publication date: March 1995 – present
- No. of issues: Stray Bullets – 41; Killers – 8; Sunshine & Roses – 42

Creative team
- Created by: David Lapham
- Written by: David Lapham
- Artist: David Lapham
- Letterer: David Lapham
- Editor: Deborah Purcell

Collected editions
- Innocence of Nihilism: ISBN 978-1-63215-113-1
- Somewhere Out West: ISBN 978-1-63215-377-7
- Other People: ISBN 978-1-63215-482-8
- Dark Days: ISBN 978-1-63215-553-5
- Hi-Jinks and Derring-Do: ISBN 978-1-63215-733-1
- Killers: ISBN 978-1-63215-215-2

Stray Bullets is an independent American comic book series published in black and white (with color covers) by El Capitan Books and Image Comics. It is written and drawn by David Lapham.

The story deals with the often criminal and sometimes tragic misadventures of a large cast of characters and takes place from the mid-1970s through the mid-1990s. Published on an irregular basis since 1995, the comic has had close to 100 issues and is a long-time critically acclaimed series.

== Publication history ==
The first issue was published in 1995 and followed an irregular publishing schedule through its fortieth issue, which was published in 2005. In a 2007 interview with Michael Lorah for the Newsarama website, Lapham revealed that the series, including the final issue of the current story arc, was on hold indefinitely:

NRAMA : I've got to ask, what is the status of El Capitan and Stray Bullets?

DAVID LAPHAM : It kills me to put Stray Bullets on hold like it's been. Maria and I both put a lot of years and a lot of hard work into the company and the book. And I still have one issue left in the current arc, left dangling. But the reality the last few years has been that it's faster and pays more to work freelance right now. The reality is I have a family and I can't just say stop everything and let's do Stray Bullets for love. I do love Bullets and know I will complete it, and the sooner the better, but I just can't commit to anything firm.

In 2009, a new ten-page story titled, Stray Bullets: Open the Goddamn Box appeared in Noir: A Collection of Crime Comics, an anthology book published by Dark Horse Comics.

In March 2014, Image Comics ended the hiatus of Stray Bullets with the publication of the final issue of the HiJinks and Derring-Do arc, and the simultaneous launch of a new series and arc titled Stray Bullets: Killers. A giant-sized softcover trade paperback edition (The Uber Alles Edition) collecting all forty-one issues of the original series was also released by Image Comics. Killers ran for eight issues throughout 2014. Following a brief hiatus, Lapham returned in early 2015 with another new story arc/series titled Stray Bullets: Sunshine & Roses that ended after 42 issues in August 2020. Lapham plans to continue publishing Stray Bullets in this fashion at Image, with each arc treated as a discrete series. In the final issue of the Sunshine & Roses arc/series, Lapham announced that the next arc/series will be titled Virginia, although he could not give a date for when the series would begin.

Lapham additionally published two issues of the Amy Racecar Color Special in 1997 and 1998, starring the alter ego of lead character Virginia Applejack.

== Collected editions ==
There has been an assortment of volumes reprinting the original comic books.

The first three story arcs in the series were originally collected in large-size hardcovers which were published in a format similar to European albums. Beginning in 2005, the first two of these same story arcs were published in traditional American comic book size softcover edition:

- Innocence of Nihilism, collecting Stray Bullets #1–7 (Hardcover: ISBN 0-9653280-2-3; Softcover: ISBN 0-9727145-6-1).
- Somewhere Out West, collecting #8–14 (Hardcover: ISBN 0-9653280-5-8; Softcover: ISBN 0-9727145-7-X).
- Other People, collecting #15–22 (Hardcover: ISBN 0-9653280-9-0).

The first 32 issues of the comic book have also been collected in eight softcovers, each of which reprint the contents of four individual issues:

- Stray Bullets Volume 1, reprinting #1–4 (ISBN 0-9653280-3-1).
- Stray Bullets Volume 2, reprinting #5–8 (ISBN 0-9653280-4-X).
- Stray Bullets Volume 3, reprinting #9–12 (ISBN 0-9653280-6-6).
- Stray Bullets Volume 4, reprinting #13–16 (ISBN 0-9653280-7-4).
- Stray Bullets Volume 5, reprinting #17–20 (ISBN 0-9653280-8-2).
- Stray Bullets Volume 6, reprinting #21–24 (ISBN 0-9727145-0-2).
- Stray Bullets Volume 7, reprinting #25–28 (ISBN 0-9727145-2-9).
- Stray Bullets Volume 8, reprinting #29–32 (ISBN 0-9727145-4-5).

In 2014 Image Comics began to release the following collected editions

- Stray Bullets: Uber Alles Edition, collecting Stray Bullets #1–41 (ISBN 1-60706-947-4)
- Stray Bullets Vol #1: Innocence of Nihilism, collecting Stray Bullets #1–7 (ISBN 978-1-63215-113-1)
- Stray Bullets Vol #2: Somewhere Out West, collecting Stray Bullets #8–14 (ISBN 978-1-63215-377-7)
- Stray Bullets Vol #3: Other People, collecting Stray Bullets #15–22 (ISBN 978-1-63215-482-8)
- Stray Bullets Vol #4: Dark Days, collecting Stray Bullets #23–30 (ISBN 978-1-63215-553-5)
- Stray Bullets Vol #5: Hi-Jinks and Derring-Do, collecting Stray Bullets #31–41 (ISBN 978-1-63215-733-1)
- Stray Bullets Vol #6: Killers, collecting Stray Bullets: Killers #1–8 (ISBN 978-1-63215-215-2)
- Stray Bullets: Sunshine & Roses Volume 1, collecting Stray Bullets: Sunshine & Roses #1–8 (ISBN 978-1-5343-0799-5)
- Stray Bullets: Sunshine & Roses Volume 2, collecting Stray Bullets: Sunshine & Roses #9–16 (ISBN 978-1-5343-0978-4)
- Stray Bullets: Sunshine & Roses Volume 3, collecting Stray Bullets: Sunshine & Roses #17–24 (ISBN 978-1-5343-0986-9)
- Stray Bullets: Sunshine & Roses Volume 4, collecting Stray Bullets: Sunshine & Roses #25–32 (ISBN 978-1-5343-1046-9)

Amy Racecar Volume 1 (ISBN 0-9727145-1-0) was also released in 2002. The volume collects the Stray Bullets issues featuring Amy Racecar as well as both issues of Amy Racecar Color Special.

== Awards ==
The series has been nominated for numerous awards. Stray Bullets won the 1996 Eisner Award for Best Writer/Artist, Drama, and the trade paperback collection Stray Bullets: Innocence of Nihilism won the 1997 Eisner Award for "Best Graphic Album-Reprint" the Comic Book Awards Almanac and was a top votegetter for the Comics Buyer's Guide Fan Award for Favorite Reprint Graphic Novel/Album for the same year.

== See also ==
Other comics by Lapham:

- Spider-Man: With Great Power
- Young Liars
