= Charlemagne (comics) =

1994 American comic book series

Publication information
- Publisher: Defiant Comics
- Schedule: Monthly
- Format: Ongoing series
- Publication date: February - July 1994
- No. of issues: 6
- Main character: Charles Smith

Creative team
- Created by: Jim Shooter
- Written by: D. G. Chichester; Jim Shooter
- Artist: Adam Pollina

Charlemagne is an American comic book series, published by Defiant Comics from February to July 1994. The series lasted for 5 issues before Defiant ceased publication. A free teaser issue, #0, was published inside Hero Illustrated #9, and not available separately.

== Series overview ==
Charlemagne revolves around Charles Smith. When the series begins in 1973, Charles is a 12-year-old boy who runs away from home after his brother Pete is reported missing in the Vietnam War. Charles manages to get to Vietnam, and spends months trying to locate Pete. His search takes him to a small village, where Charles sees his brother being attacked by a helicopter. Pete is killed by a bomb, and Charles is also badly injured, his legs blown off in a second explosion.

Flown back to an America, Charles spends several months in a coma, where he dreams of ways to save his brother. When Charles finally wakes up, it is 1993, and Charles has somehow regrown his legs. He now has super-strength and the ability to leap great distances. He leaves the hospital and sets off again in search of his brother.

Charles confronts countless super-powered beings over the course of his adventures. While in New York, he is saved from attacking malcontents by 'Michael', a being who can perceive and remove mystical antagonists from the minds of others. Michael is the star of another Defiant comic series, Dark Dominion. Later, Charles is attacked by a large, muscle-bound pink humanoid who delights in influencing others into suicidal depression. Charles saves Michael, whom he now considers a friend, from this entity. It turns his powers on him. Charles is able to resist this by grabbing his brother's dog tags, which he now wears. The plain reminder of better times allows him to mentally resist the monster then defeat it physically. In the next issue, Michael fights with War Dancer, the star of another Defiant series.

The series ends with Charles revisiting his family 20 years after he had left home.
