= Spider-Man: With Great Power =

Comic book limited series

- Cover to Spider-Man: With Great Power #1 by Tony Harris.

Publication information
- Publisher: Marvel Comics
- Schedule: Monthly
- Format: Limited series
- Genre: Superhero; Coming-of-age
- Publication date: January 9, 2008
- No. of issues: 5

Creative team
- Written by: David Lapham
- Artist: Tony Harris

Spider-Man: With Great Power is a five-issue comic book limited series from Marvel Comics written by David Lapham and illustrated by Tony Harris, which premiered on January 9, 2008. The series examines Spider-Man's formative days, focusing on the period between the accident that gave Peter Parker superhuman powers and the murder of his Uncle Ben. The series was published under Marvel's Marvel Knights imprint.

== Production ==
Editor Warren Simons explained that the idea came to David Lapham years previously when flipping through Amazing Fantasy #15 (the comic book in which Spider-Man first appeared), and noted the various newspaper headlines "Spider-Man Wins Showbiz Award", "Spider-Man Plays to Packed House", and "Who Is Spider-Man?". Tony Harris explained that With Great Power takes place in between the two panels in which Amazing Fantasy writer Stan Lee's narration mentions the coming weeks and months that passed, during which Spider-Man used his superhuman abilities to become a celebrity. Lapham explained that the series would examine how a teenager would deal with gaining superhuman powers, becoming a national celebrity, and upholding his responsibilities as a high school student. The inciting incident of the story would be Peter being bitten by the radioactive spider, and being approached by fight promoter Monty Caabash after successfully fighting wrestler Crusher Hogan. Other characters and themes will include mobsters involved with Spider-Man's professional wrestling career, a Mrs. Robinson figure in Peter's life, giant monsters, and childhood love. Perennial Spider-Man supporting cast members such as Flash Thompson, Liz Allan and J. Jonah Jameson will also be present.

Harris also stated that his rendition of the series would retain as much of the source material's designs as possible, including the "nerdy" wardrobe and glasses worn by Parker 45 years previously, but that he would give him an updated hairstyle. Harris stated that he expanded upon the design of the machine that irradiated the spider that would bite Peter Parker, though it would be familiar to those who read Amazing Fantasy #15, and that he would depict a mix of automobiles in background scenes from various eras that would obscure the time period in which the story takes place.

== Critical reception ==
The book holds a critics' rating of 5.6 out of 10 at the review aggregator website Comic Book Round Up, based on seven reviews.
