= Dogs of War (comics) =

Publication information
- Publisher: Defiant Comics
- First appearance: Warriors of Plasm #1 (August 1993)
- Created by: Jim Shooter

In-story information
- Alter ego: Elvis Mazerov
- Team affiliations: Warriors of Plasm
- Notable aliases: Shooter
- Abilities: Ability to turn invisible

Dogs of War is a comic book series that was published by Defiant Comics from April to August 1994. The series lasted only five issues before Defiant ceased publication of the title.

The book was based on characters created by Jim Shooter. Most of the issues were conceptualized by Shooter, and written by Art Holcomb and penciled by artist Georges Jeanty.

== Characters ==
- Shooter - Elvis Mazerov, an ex-military officer, was the feature character of Dogs of War. Nicknamed after his creator, Jim Shooter, Elvis gained his powers — the ability to turn invisible — when he was abducted by aliens, taken to another planet and had his DNA altered through bioengineering.
- Moose gained his powers when he was abducted by aliens, taken to another planet and had his DNA altered through bioengineering.

== Publication history ==
Elvis' story began in the Warriors of Plasm comic where he was originally introduced and featured. Dogs of War is a spin-off of Warriors of Plasm.

== The Schism that never was ==
Originally, Jim Shooter, the founder and editor-in-chief of Defiant Comics, had planned to publish an inner-company "crossover" featuring all the characters and titles in the Defiant universe.

The crossover was a concept that Shooter had originally developed during his tenure as editor-in-chief at Marvel Comics. His Secret Wars crossover with Marvel was originally a big hit with comic fans. Shooter would later revive the idea while editor-in-chief at Valiant Comics, with the Unity crossover, another big hit with fans in the summer of 1992.

This time, the crossover was to be called Schism, but only two issues (Dogs of War #5 and Warriors of Plasm #13) made it onto comic store shelves before the company ceased publishing all its titles.
