= Pasqual Ferry =

Spanish comic book artist and penciller

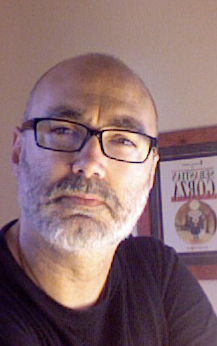
- Portrait of Pasqual Ferry
- Born: Pasqual Ferrándiz Arroyo; 24 March 1961 (age 65) Barcelona, Spain
- Areas: Penciller, Artist
- Pseudonyms: Paschalis; Pascual; Pascal Ferry
- Notable works: Heroes for Hire; Action Comics; Adam Strange

Pasqual Ferrándiz Arroyo (born 24 March 1961), known by the pen-name Pasqual Ferry (sometimes credited as Paschalis, Pascual or Pascal Ferry), is a Spanish comic book artist and penciller.

== Biography ==
Ferry was interested in comics from an early age, stating his first love in comics "was Franquin, Mézières, especially and Moebius". Ferry's interest in superhero comics came after a visit to the offices of Marvel Comics in New York.

In Spain, Ferry worked for Albert Rué's animation studio, as well as publishing work in several Spanish comic magazines.

In 1993, Ferry created the character Plasmer with writer Glenn Dakin for an eponymous 4-issue miniseries for Marvel UK.

When Marvel UK closed in 1995, Ferry moved to working for Marvel Comics. After providing fill-in for several issues of X-Men-related comics, he launched the first Heroes for Hire series in 1997 with Roger Stern and John Ostrander, and would provide pencils on 15 of the 19 issues.

In 1999, Ferry provided pencils on all nine issues of a Warlock miniseries, written by Louise Simonson.

After leaving Marvel, Ferry worked on several DC Comics, including Superboy (1994), Action Comics (2000) and Adam Strange (2004).

In 2005, he and writer Grant Morrison began work on the Seven Soldiers of Victory limited series Mister Miracle, which re-introduced the Shilo Norman version of the character. However, due to scheduling issues, he was only able to do the first issue.

In mid-2006, Ferry became the new artist on Marvel's Ultimate Fantastic Four with writer Mike Carey.

In 2010, Ferry became the regular artist on Marvel's Thor teamed with writer Matt Fraction.

In 2016, Ferry launched a crowdfunding campaign for a creator-owned comic entitled ALICE, inspired by Lewis Caroll’s Alice in Wonderland.

In 2019, Ferry provided the primary cover art for the Image Comics series Chrononauts: FutureShock.

In 2021, Ferry partnered with Chip Zdarsky on a new What If series for Marvel titled Spider-Man: Spider's Shadow.

In March 2023, Ferry launched a new Doctor Strange ongoing series with writer Jed MacKay.

In May 2025, Ferry was announced as the artist on the relaunched Thor comic, later revealed as The Mortal Thor, written by Al Ewing.

== Bibliography ==
Artwork for the cover of Adam Strange #8 (2004), drawn by Ferry

=== DC ===
- Justice League #18 (with Scott Snyder, 2019)
- Mr. Miracle #1-2, Seven Soldiers of Victory (with Grant Morrison and Freddie Williams II, 2005–06)
- Adam Strange: Planet Heist (pencils, with Andy Diggle and colors by Dave McCaig, 8-issue limited series, 2004–2005)
- Tom Strong #26 (with Mark Schultz, 2004)
- Action Comics #771, 786-788, 792-793, 798, 800, 803-810 (2000–04)

=== Marvel ===
- The Mortal Thor (with Al Ewing, 2025-present)
- Doctor Strange (with Jed MacKay, 2023–present)
- Namor: Conquered Shores #1-5 (with Christopher Cantwell, 2022-2023)
- Spider-Man: Spider's Shadow (with Chip Zdarsky, 2021)
- Thor (with Matt Fraction, 2010-2012)
- Ender's Game: Battle School (with Chris Yost, 2008–2009)
- Ultimate Iron Man II #1-5 (with Orson Scott Card, 2008)
- Ultimate Fantastic Four #33-38, 42-46 (with Mike Carey, 2006–07)
- Ultimate Fantastic Four/X-Men #1-2 (with Mike Carey, 2006)
- Young Avengers Special #1 (with Allan Heinberg, 2005)
- New Avengers #24 (with Brian Michael Bendis, 2006)
- X-Men #68 (with Scott Lobdell & Steve Seagle, 1997)
- Fantastic Four 2099 #6-8 (with Ben Raab & Terry Kavanagh, 1996)
- Plasmer #1-4 (with Glenn Dakin, 1993)
