= Namor: Conquered Shores =

Limited comic book series published by Marvel Comics

Publication information
- Publisher: Marvel Comics
- Schedule: Monthly
- Format: Limited series
- Genre: Post-apocalyptic; Superhero
- Publication date: October 12, 2022 — February 8, 2023
- No. of issues: 5
- Main character(s): Namor; Human Torch; Luke Cage; Captain America

Creative team
- Written by: Christopher Cantwell
- Artist: Pasqual Ferry
- Letterer: Joe Caramagna
- Colorist: Matt Hollingsworth

Namor the Sub-Mariner: Conquered Shores, also simply referred to as Namor: Conquered Shores, is an American comic book based on the Marvel Comics character Namor. The five-issue limited series – written by Christopher Cantwell and illustrated by Pasqual Ferry – began its monthly publication on October 12, 2022 and ended on February 8, 2023.

== Development ==
The five-issue limited series Namor: Conquered Shores was written by Christopher Cantwell and illustrated by Pasqual Ferry. It was also lettered by Joe Caramagna and colored by Matt Hollingsworth.

== Publication history ==
Namor: Conquered Shores began its monthly publication with the release of its first issue on October 12, 2022, and concluded with the launch of its fifth and final issue on February 8, 2023.

=== Issues ===
Issue	Title	Publication date	Ref.
#1	"Hope's Embers"	October 12, 2022	
#2	"Death by Machine"	November 16, 2022	
#3	"Monsters of the Past"	December 21, 2022	
#4	"Soul of the Machine"	January 18, 2023	
#5	"The Shared Doom"	February 8, 2023	

== Reception ==
Reviewing Namor: Conquered Shores, Nicole Drum of ComicBook.com wrote: "Namor: Conquered Shores reads like the start of an incredible story and is easily one of the best Namor stories so far in a long history. By honoring the character's history and roots, Cantwell and Ferry are bringing this beloved character to life in a manner that is accessible and thoughtful all in the furtherance of a story possessing real questions about the human condition, reflection, and compassion." Sergio Pereira of Comic Book Resources described Namor: Conquered Shores as "a much better version" of Kevin Reynolds' film Waterworld (1995), explaining that the post-apocalyptic setting present in the series is better developed than the one seen in the film.
