= Plasmer =

Publication information
- Publisher: Marvel Comics
- Created by: Glenn Dakin; Pascual Ferry

Plasmer is a character appearing in American comic books published by Marvel Comics. The character was created by Glenn Dakin and Pascual Ferry. Plasmer was a short-lived 1993 comic book series from Marvel UK.

== Fictional character biography ==
Plasmer was about a shapeshifting, artificial lifeform created by Doctor Oonagh Mullarkey. Dr. Mullarkey used both science and magic to separate the good and evil parts of her personality as a means of increasing her abilities. The good parts of her were placed in a formless protoplasm that developed a life of its own, and became the superhero Plasmer.

== Controversy ==
Plasmer was the subject of a Marvel lawsuit against Defiant Comics' Plasm due to alleged similarities in name. Defiant changed the name to Warriors of Plasm but went bankrupt soon after due to the legal costs.
