= Daredevil/Batman: Eye for an Eye =

Graphic novel published by Marvel Comics

Publication information
- Publisher: DC Comics/Marvel Comics
- Genre: Superhero
- Publication date: January 1997
- No. of issues: 1
- Main character(s): Daredevil; Batman

Creative team
- Written by: D. G. Chichester
- Penciller: Scott McDaniel
- Inker: Derek Fisher
- Letterer: Bill Oakley
- Colorist: Gregory Wright

Daredevil/Batman: Eye for an Eye is an Elseworlds graphic novel published by Marvel Comics in 1997, written by D. G. Chichester, with art by Scott McDaniel. It is a standalone, non-canon crossover between Marvel's Daredevil and DC Comics' Batman.

== Plot ==
Daredevil and Batman must work together to defeat Two-Face, who partners with Marvel villain Mr. Hyde. Batman pursues the two villains to New York, where Daredevil is investigating a series of thefts of computer equipment, which leads him to the same criminal pair. Batman and Daredevil initially clash, even coming to blows, before ultimately resolving to work together.

Two-Face and Mr. Hyde have stolen a computer chip which acts as powerfully as a human brain, but the chip needs to be housed in organic brain tissue. Two-Face's plan, therefore, is to trick Mr. Hyde into consuming large quantities of a specific drug, which will both speed up the formation of the chip and eventually kill Hyde, allowing Two-Face to harvest the chip from Hyde's brain.

It is also revealed that Harvey Dent was once friends with Matt Murdock: prior to his disfigurement, Dent believed in giving criminals a chance at rehabilitation, while Murdock believed in final justice. Having since come around to Dent's philosophy, Murdock, as Daredevil, manages to talk Two-Face out of killing Hyde when the four face off.

Two-Face agrees to help Daredevil and Batman cure Mr. Hyde of the drugs in his system, before disappearing again, and later claiming that this act of goodness was "simply the last of Harvey Dent". The story concludes with the two heroes out of costume, as Bruce Wayne warns Matt Murdock not to return to Gotham, something which Murdock interprets as a "dare".
