= David Lapham =

American comic book creator

- Born: 1970 (age 55–56)
- Areas: Artist, writer
- Notable works: Stray Bullets; Harbinger
- Awards: Best Writer/Artist Eisner Awards (1996)

David Lapham (born 1970) is an American comic book writer, artist, and cartoonist, best known for his work on the independent comic book Stray Bullets.

== Career ==
David Lapham started his career in 1990 as a penciller at Valiant Comics. He went on to work under editor Jim Shooter at Defiant Comics, where they co-created Warriors of Plasm in 1993.

He set up his own publishing company, El Capitan Books, in 1995, to self-publish Stray Bullets which he wrote, drew and lettered himself. He then took a sabbatical from Stray Bullets in 2000, to produce his nine-issue period murder mystery Murder Me Dead, also from El Capitan Books.

Lapham began working on more mainstream comics work from 2005 onwards, writing a story arc for Top Cow Comics' The Darkness ("Hell House", vol. 2, #17–20), a 12-part Batman storyline in Detective Comics ("City of Crime" #801–808 and 811–814) for DC Comics and writing and pencilling the six-part Daredevil Vs. Punisher: Means And Ends limited series for Marvel Comics. In late 2006, Marvel released Giant-Size Wolverine #1, with a 34-page Lapham story illustrated by David Aja, and DC began releasing Tales of the Unexpected with an eight-issue arc starring the Spectre, which was also written by Lapham. Vertigo published the original graphic novel Silverfish in July 2007, and he drew Terror, Inc. for the Marvel MAX line. He then wrote the Vertigo series Young Liars and took over from Garth Ennis as writer on Crossed.

Publication of Stray Bullets ceased after its fortieth issue, along with Lapham's self-published futuristic science-fiction miniseries, The Parallax Man. The Parallax Man had been announced to debut in 2005 but was never officially solicited. In 2007, Lapham expressed interest in completing both projects. 2009 saw the release of Dark Horse: Noir, which included a Stray Bullets story that took place within the still incomplete arc. In March 2010, it was reported that Lapham was working on a Predator series for Dark Horse Comics.

In March 2014, the long-awaited forty-first and final issue of the initial Stray Bullets arc and series as whole was released after the Laphams made a deal with Image Comics. On the same day, an omnibus edition of all forty-one issues was released, as well as the first issue of a new series titled Stray Bullets: Killers. At Image, Lapham has continued Stray Bullets as a series of story arcs separated into their own miniseries: Stray Bullets: Killers ran for eight issues, followed after a brief hiatus by a second arc: Stray Bullets: Sunshine & Roses ran for forty-two issues.

== Awards ==
- Eisner Awards
  - 1996 – Best Writer/Artist (for Stray Bullets).
  - 1997 – Best Graphic Album: Reprint (for Stray Bullets: Innocence of Nihilism)
- Inkpot Award (2005)

== Bibliography ==
As an artist on all unless otherwise noted; additionally writer, where noted:

=== Valiant Comics ===
Titles published by Valiant include:

- WWF Battlemania #1 (1991)
- Magnus Robot Fighter #5–8 (1991–1992)
- Harbinger #1–13 (1992–1993, #0 (1993); also writer #10–13
- Shadowman #1–2, 4–5 (1992)
- Rai #0 (1992)
- H.A.R.D. Corps #1 (1992)

=== Defiant Comics ===
Titles published by Defiant include:

- Warriors of Plasm #1–11, 13 (1993–1994), #0 (1993); also writer #5–11, 13
- Splatterball (one-shot, 1993); also writer
- Defiant: Genesis (one-shot, 1993)

=== DC Comics ===
Titles published by DC Comics include:

- Superman Annual #5 (1993)
- Detective Comics #800–808, 811–814 (2005–2006); also writer
- Tales of the Unexpected #1–8 (2006–2007)
- The Spirit #5 (2010); writer only
- Dial H #6–7 (2012); artist only

==== Vertigo ====
Titles published by DC Comics' Vertigo imprint include:

- Fables #59 (2007), #92–93 (2010)
- Silverfish (graphic novel, 2007); also writer
- Young Liars #1–18 (2008–2009); also writer
- American Splendor vol. 2, #1–2 (2008)
- DMZ #59 (2011)
- House of Mystery #38 (2011)
- The Unexpected (one-shot, 2011)

==== Wildstorm ====
Titles published by DC Comics' Wildstorm imprint include:

- Driver: Crossing the Line #0 (2010); writer only
- Modern Warfare 2: Ghost #1–6 (2010); writer only
- Sparta USA #1–6 (2010); writer only
- Fringe: Tales from the Fringe #2 2010)

=== El Capitan Books ===
Titles published by El Capitan, Lapham's own publishing company, include:

- Stray Bullets #1–40 (1995–2005); also writer
- Amy Racecar Color Special #1–2 (1997 & 1999); also writer
- Murder Me Dead #1–9 (2000–2001); also writer

=== Dark Horse Comics ===
Titles published by Dark Horse include:

- Harlan Ellison's Dream Corridor #4 (1995)
- Noir: A Collection of Crime Comics (anthology graphic novel, 2009); also writer (this is a Stray Bullets story)
- Predators #1–4 (2010); writer only
- Preserve the Game (anthology one-shot, 2010); also writer
- Kull #1–4 (2010–2011); writer only
- Kull: The Cat and the Skull #1–4 (2011–2012)
- Creepy #5 (2011); also writer
- Robert E. Howard's Savage Sword #3–4 (2011–2012); writer only
- Guillermo del Toro and Chuck Hogan's The Strain #1–11 (2011–2013); writer only
- Guillermo del Toro and Chuck Hogan's The Strain: The Fall #1–9 (2013–2014); writer only
- Guillermo del Toro and Chuck Hogan's The Strain: The Night Eternal #1–12 (2014–2015); writer only
- Guillermo del Toro and Chuck Hogan's The Strain: Mister Quinlan – Vampire Hunter #1–5 (2016–2017); writer only
- American Caper #1 (2025); artist only

=== Marvel Comics ===
Titles published by Marvel include:

- Daredevil vs. Punisher: Means and Ends #1–6 (2005–2006); also writer
- Giant-Size Wolverine: "House of Blood and Sorrow" (2006); writer only
- Wolverine: The Amazing Immortal Man and Other Bloody Tales (one-shot, 2008)
- Wolverine: Debt of Death (with David Aja, one-shot, 2011)
- Terror, Inc. #1–5 (2007–2008); also writer
- Terror, Inc.: Apocalypse Soon #1–4 (2009)
- Spider-Man: With Great Power... #1–5 (2008); writer only
- The Immortal Iron Fist #27 (2009)
- Mystic Comics 70th Anniversary Special (2009); also writer
- Immortal Weapons #5 (2009); writer only
- Deadpool #1000 (2010); also writer
- DeadpoolMAX #1–12 (2010–2012); also writer
- PunisherMAX: Tiny Ugly World (one-shot, 2010); writer only
- Point One: "Age of Apocalypse: The Myth of Man" (one-shot, 2011); writer only
- Age of Apocalypse #1–14 (2012–2013); writer only

=== Avatar Press ===
Titles published by Avatar include:

- Crossed 3D: Volume 1 (graphic novel, 2011)
- Crossed Psychopath #1–7 (2011–2012)
- Crossed Badlands #10–13, 21–24, 33–36 (2012–2013)
- Caligula #1–6 (2011–2012); writer only
- Caligula Heart of Rome #1–6 (2012–2013); writer only
- Ferals #1–18 (2011–2013); writer only
- Dan the Unharmable #1–12 (2012–2013); writer only

=== Image Comics ===
Titles published by Image include:

- Stray Bullets #41 (2014); also writer
- Stray Bullets: Killers #1–8 (2014); also writer
- Stray Bullets: Sunshine & Roses #1–42 (2015–2020); also writer

=== Other publishers ===
Titles published by various American publishers include:

- The Darkness vol. 2, #17–20 (Top Cow Comics, 2004–2005); writer only
- 30 Days of Night: 30 Days 'till Death #1–4 (IDW Publishing, 2009–2009); also writer
- G.I. Joe: Origins #20–23 (2010–2011); writer only
- Damaged #1–6 (2011–2012); writer only

=== Covers only ===
- Amazing Heroes #199 (Fantagraphics Books, 1992)
- Rai #1 (Valiant Comics, 1992)
- X-O Manowar #3 (Valiant, 1992)
- Shadowman #3 (Valiant Comics, 1992)
- Harbinger #14 (Valiant Comics, 1993)
- Warriors of Plasm #12 (Defiant Comics, 1994)

Preceded by Andersen Gabrych	Detective Comics writer 2005–2006	Succeeded by James Dale Robinson
