= Thieves and Kings =

Canadian comic book series by Mark Oakley

Publication information
- Schedule: Monthly
- Genre: High fantasy
- Publication date: 1994
- Main character(s): Rubel; Heath Wingwhit; Quinton Zempfester; Soracia; Katara; Red Sorceress; Ramanious

Creative team
- Created by: Mark Oakley
- Written by: Mark Oakley
- Artist: Mark Oakley

Thieves and Kings (stylized as Thieves & Kings) is a Canadian comic book series written, penciled and published independently and irregularly by Mark Oakley.

The first issue was published in September 1994, with the creator planning on publishing a complete saga comprising 100 issues and about 2000 pages. The series is available as individual comic issues and in trade paperback form.

Thieves & Kings is high fantasy set in a land called Oceansend, with most of the story focused in and around the capital city of Highborn. The story follows the life of a young thief named Rubel and a young sorceress named Heath, but features a larger cast of characters.

Thieves & Kings is distinct from most other comics in that the creator makes extensive use of illustrated story pages in addition to the traditional sequential art found in most comics.

== Plot ==
Steve Raiteri gives this summary of the Thieves & Kings story: " In this thoroughly engrossing self-published black-and-white fantasy saga, a multi-faceted conflict plays out between the evil Lady Locumire, who supports a power-hungry prince in his war of conquest, and a loose group of friends and factions opposing her. Among the cast are 12-year-old Heath Wingwhit, a powerful sorceress living through successive reincarnations, brought 1000 years into her future to learn magic; Rubel, a teenage thief with special abilities and charisma; Soracia, a beautiful 10,000-year-old sorceress attempting to reclaim herself from evil; Princess Katara, Heath’s current incarnation, who’s hatching a still-obscure but ambitious plot with her friends the trolls; and the immortal wizard Quinton Zempfester, who provides hilarious comic relief on-panel but holds great power behind the scenes."

== Characters ==
Rubel (pronounced "rue-bell")
Thieves & Kings' protagonist, Rubel is a combination of hero and everyman. The story opens with Rubel as a boy of 14, (he ages as the story progresses) returning home from an apprenticeship at sea. Rubel was born in the "Sleeping Wood," a magical forest that borders Highborn, and was raised by his grandfather, with additional influence from Quinton the wizard and some local townspeople. At a very young age (recounted in the book as a flashback) Rubel declared himself to be a "thief," a vocation in Oceansend that means a lot more than just one-who-steals, and seems to be closer to paladin. Rubel has proven himself to be capable of very decisive action, while maintaining an innocent, almost naive, view of the world.

Heath Wingwhit
Heath is a few years younger than Rubel. She enters the story as a young orphaned girl living in the small village of Millbrook, in the past. She apprentices herself to the wizard Quinton, despite the fact that most in Millbrook believe him to be a fraud. She eventually travels to Highborn, where she meets Rubel and becomes a powerful sorceress in her own right.

Quinton Zempfester (a.k.a. Kaluvinar)
Quinton is a wizard. He is immortal, and seems to be very adept at planning for events many years in advance. While he frequently appears to be scatter-brained and even foolish, he seems to have the respect of many of the mystical and powerful beings in Oceansend. Quinton very rarely displays any magical abilities directly.

Cespinarve Rogue
A dragon. He is smaller and younger than other dragons, and thus they ignored him until he felt he needed to prove himself by defeating Kath. He failed, and ran away to hide. He now sleeps, and his dream is open to those who know how to get in. He hates thieves.

Soracia (a.k.a. The Shadow Lady, Queen of Halves, or Lady Salina)
Soracia is an immortal sorceress. While she seems to be evil, her motivation is mysterious and she frequently seems to be in conflict with her own nature. She appears to love Rubel, which contributes to her internal struggle. Soracia has two long, black magic swords, which are able to fight on their own when summoned.

Varkias
Varkias is a winged imp, who may be immortal, but has a short memory. He is Rubel's companion, and is far more sensible. Varkias was once the companion of the Red Sorceress.

Katara (Pronounced Ka-tar-a)
Katara is the princess of the kingdom, and a sorceress in her own right. She abandoned the palace for the forest, where she joined a band of trolls as leader, and seems to be assembling an army of the Trolls living in the forest. Rubel is officially Katara's thief. Katara may or may not be going insane, perhaps due to the presence of Heath in the modern era.

Loe
Katara's second in command. He was living under a bridge in the Sleeping Wood when she ran away, and so became the first of her Troll recruits.

Locumire
Locumire is a fairly old evil sorceress who is currently, along with the prince, running the kingdom. She has a cabal of young apprentices who work with her.

Kimithin (a.k.a. Jale)
An apprentice of Locumire, she has fallen in love with the thief Rubel.

Leahanna (a.k.a. Morthalanue)
An apprentice of Locumire and Kimithin's best friend. She acts power crazed and violent most of the time, but according to Kimithin "It's less when she's playing with her kitten."

Red Sorceress
The Red Sorceress is the Shadow Lady's sister. Whereas Soracia has been immortal since they were born, the Red Sorceress is sequentially immortal—she is reborn in each generation. Heath is the Red Sorceress for her generation; Katara is the Red Sorceress for the current generation. There may have been a love triangle between Soracia, the Red Sorceress, and Quinton in the past; historically, the Red Sorceress and her sister have a combative relationship. Locumire was once made Quinton's protégé under the erroneous assumption that she was that generation's Red Sorceress.

Ramanious (a.k.a. Kath)
The major villain. Locumire's boss, and perhaps Soracia's as well, he is barely mentioned, but is the force that opposes Kaluvinar. As Shadow Lady and the Red Sorceress stand to one another, so do Kath and Kaluvinar. The interactions between these grand underlying aspects are mirrored in the play of their more human aspects.

Jurid
A nasty monster. Jurid is Kath's shadow. He has fought Heath, Quinton, and Rubel, at least; Locumire has some control over him.

Klachilies
Another monster created by Kath. Also known as the Gorgon. He was Jurid's partner in guarding the Black Tower, apparently Kath's stronghold, until Cespinarve Rogue came to prove his worth to the other dragons by defeating Kath. Jurid and Klachilies won the fight, but Rogue bit Jurid and thus Kath through him. With his "last breath" (According to Klachilies) Kath ordered the Gorgon to chase Rogue. Klachilies did so, and when Rogue went to sleep he entered the dragon's dreams with the intent of getting revenge for his master. Later Soracia captures Klachilies.

Dyme Dun Tate
The Knight in Rubel's childhood club, the Monster Slayers.

Islen Porter
One of Rubel's childhood friends. She was the sorceress in their group, but when Rubel came back from the sea she had married the baker's son, who was an enemy to the cause.

Jennifer Porter
Islen's mother. She likes Rubel very much, and when Heath arrives she lets her stay at her house.

Vale Porter
Jennifer's mother. She is a very bitter old woman, and doesn't like any of Rubel's friends on principle.

Baily
Rubel's dog. He was the Hound in the Monster Slayers. He lived in Jennifer Porter's house until, a few months before Rubel came back, Vale choked Baily with a chicken bone.

Smith Robins
A good friend of Jennifer's. He is a member of the Prince Guard, but doesn't like the way things are turning out. He is friendly towards Heath. His family is corrupt so he joined the Prince Guard to try and break away from them.

Geof Perkinson
A rich, if highly incompetent, man. He likes Jennifer, and Vale wants her to marry him. Jennifer does not like Geof.

The Lamp Knights (a.k.a. the Iron Guard)
Undead constructs, made by Kath. They have superhuman strength, and are almost immortal. There are a few who are loyal to Soracia.

The Clockwork Knights
Creations of Quinton. He made them to combat the Lamp Knights, but destroyed them within fifteen years, because they were nearly unstoppable and killed all in their path. Katara wants to use them against the Lamp Knights when she overthrows Oceansend.
