= War Dancer =

The logo for War Dancer

War Dancer is a comic book series that was published by Defiant Comics, from February to July 1994.

The series was created and illustrated by Alan Weiss and co-written by Weiss and comics author, creator and one time former editor-in-chief of Marvel Comics and Valiant Comics, Jim Shooter.

The series spanned a total of six issues until Defiant ceased its publication in the summer of 1994.

== Plot ==
The story follows Ahrq Tsolmec, a prince from another world who uses his powers of universal quantum frequency control to summon the end of worlds, to speed up the end of all things in order to bring back Zahn Ree, his one true love. The Dancer is not a typical 'superhero' in terms of good/evil, and Alan Weiss' character is a unique and original creation.

War Dancer features a storyline that includes many Aztec and Mayan elements, including names and places as well as the armor and jewelry the Dancer wears on his neck and helmet. War Dancer's arrival on Earth is preceded by the appearance of an Aztec pyramid.

The character has conflict with the heroic super-powered Charles Smith.
