= Young Liars (comics) =

Comic

- Cover of Young Liars #1 (May 2008) by David Lapham.

Publication information
- Publisher: Vertigo
- Schedule: Monthly
- Format: Ongoing series
- Genre: Crime
- Publication date: May 2008 – October 2009
- No. of issues: 18

Creative team
- Created by: David Lapham
- Written by: David Lapham
- Artist: David Lapham
- Letterer: Jared K. Fletcher
- Colorist: Lee Loughridge
- Editor(s): Shelly Bond; Angela Rufino

Collected editions
- Daydream Believer: ISBN 1-4012-1978-0
- Maestro: ISBN 1-40122-272-2
- Rock Life: ISBN 1-40122-601-9

Young Liars is a comic book series created by David Lapham. It was published by DC Comics as a part of that company's Vertigo imprint. The first issue was released in March 2008.

The book centers around a group of 20-somethings in modern-day New York City, though the story quickly expands to other parts of America and the world. All of them have disturbing secrets about themselves that they keep from the others, and even the readers are left to decide what is true and what are lies.

== Publication history ==
Young Liars was cancelled in October 2009, with the final issue being #18.

== Characters ==
- Danny: The protagonist of the book, he is an aspiring musician who moved to New York from Texas along with Sadie. He obsesses over Sadie, and often falls into extremely self-destructive behaviour. He has tried to kill himself multiple times in the series, including trying to set himself on fire, leaving horrific burns on his torso (though he claims to the others that he got them elsewhere).
- Sadie: The other central character in the story, Sadie is the daughter of the owner of the Brown Bag Superstore (a Wal-Mart-style store, but bigger), and has run away from her family. As a result, her family have sent Pinkertons, or wetworks spies and assassins, out to find her. She repeatedly brings up warnings about "The Spiders from Mars" and their plans to enslave humanity. As the series progresses, it is revealed that prior to being shot in the head, Sadie was a self-involved manipulator who constantly argued and fought with Danny. After being shot in the head, the bullet becomes lodged in her brain, turning her into a "living cartoon character" with a lust for dancing, fighting, performing insane stunts, and upon losing her virginity to Danny, sleeping with him. Danny develops a hold over Sadie after she is shot, and she will do anything for him.
- Loreli: Towards the end of the series, it is revealed that Sadie was becoming as perverted as the rest of the Browning clan, so her mother put her younger sister Loreli up for adoption early on. Danny finds out about the existence of Loreli, and goes to find her. He sets up a new persona for himself, and eventually comes to believe that Sadie's "spiders from Mars" have altered reality and have buried Sadie in Loreli's subconscious, although Danny is told that Sadie died at age 6 when she fell down a well.
- CeeCee: CeeCee is a groupie for rock bands. She is considered Sadie's best friend. Danny hates her and insultingly calls her "Big C". She was in college but dropped out to "have a rock star's babies" instead. Instead, she got syphilis and is now unable to have children, though it does not stop her from sleeping with musicians. It is later revealed that Danny dislikes her because she slept with him, feigning neediness so she could manipulate her way into Sadie's life. Later on, she sleeps with him again when they bond over their pasts. It is later suggested Danny raped her at one point instead, and that she does not know him at all except as the rapist.
- Donnie: Donnie is a male cross-dresser. All the other characters seem to like him, despite their own conflicts amongst themselves. He is also a heroin addict, and has overdosed at least once.
- Annie X: A former fashion model, Jackie (her real name) is a waitress at a club initially. Ironically, despite the nickname, she is not anorexic but actually bulimic. She generally dislikes both Sadie and Danny's neediness, especially when the Pinkertons begin to cause trouble for the entire group, even though she calls Sadie's location in. Jackie also pulls double duty as an observer of Danny and Sadie for the Martian spiders, though she quits to "join the rebellion".
- Runco: Although rich, Runco is obsessed with get-rich-quick schemes. At one point, he suggests the group "recover" a painting. He repeatedly informs the Pinkertons of Sadie's whereabouts in hopes of profit, though this always backfires on him.
- Puss Bag is an English punk rock fan that the group meets in Spain. According to him, his mother was kicked in the stomach by Johnny Rotten of the Sex Pistols while he was still in the womb. Though he's friendly to all of the characters and even saves them on a couple of occasions, Danny takes an immediate disliking to him, largely because he thinks Puss Bag slept with Sadie, though he never did.
- Lloyd Browning, Lloyd, Jr., Jack Wonderwall, and The Pinkertons: Lloyd Browning turned his wife's parents' mom and pop store into a retail empire that provides everything from car to groceries to entertainment to health care; his son and spider lord who wishes to wrestle control of the Brown Bag from Sadie so he can propagate a world takeover with his spider army; and the President of Brown Bag, who is a spider, but claims to be rebelling against the invasion force. Lloyd's personal army, The Pinkertons, are a group of elite killers who chase Sadie down when Browning receives tips of his wayward daughter's whereabouts. Sadie describes them as "Nazis injected with special powers by the Spiders from Mars". They tend to be somewhat questionable masters of disguise (sometimes adopting elaborate ones, and at others wearing eyeglasses with fake noses and moustaches attached), but make up for this with their brutal sadism, including castrations and beheadings. The general public believes the faces of the Brown Bag chain to be as American as apple pie, but in reality, they are a group of deviants.
- Lance is a non-believer, a cynical gay guy, a lover of the entertainment medium, and above all, a soldier in the army of love. He makes particular YouTube situation videos.

== Plot ==
The story opens up outside of a nightclub, where Sadie (who was shot in the head sometime prior, leading her to have mental delusions of invulnerability) beats up a bouncer and later a gang member. The main characters are all introduced inside, where Runco tries to convince them to go to Spain to steal a painting. When they refuse, he calls the Pinkertons, a group of thugs working to find Sadie for her father, who quickly advance on the nightclub. Meanwhile, Donnie shoots heroin in the bathroom, and Danny tries to tell Sadie he loves her, with no success.

In a flashback, it is revealed how Danny met Sadie. He worked in a Brown Bag Superstore, a chain of stores owned by Sadie's father. Danny planned to go to a concert with his questionably best friend Kenny, who betrays Danny by revealing he is taking Sadie after he lies to their friend Joanie about taking her.

Ronald, his boss and Joannie's brother, forces Danny to work to indirectly anger Kenny (not knowing Kenny lied to Danny too). Danny abandons work for the concert and finds Kenny, who says Sadie left him after the pair arrived for cooler attendees. At the concert, the Pinkertons arrive for Sadie, a self-absorbed, verbally abusive woman, who escapes with and warms to Danny after he steals alcohol for her and the two go carousing. When he gets home, Danny finds Kenny's severed head in the fridge, and his mom and brother dead, a message from the Pinkertons.

Back to the Nightclub in the present, the group flee the Pinkertons just as the police raid the building, while Donnie is having an overdose. Outside, they encounter the gang member from before with his friends. The Pinkertons kill the gang members, but Sadie steals a garbage truck and they make their escape. They take Donnie to a hospital, where a Pinkerton takes Sadie at gunpoint. Sadie and Danny kill him, which freaks out the others. They decide to flee the country, and go to Spain on Runco's theft plan.

On the cruise to Spain, Danny and Sadie have sex. They abandon the ship and go the rest of the way by lifeboat, after finding out Runco lied about paying for the tickets. Once they get there, Sadie goes missing and turns up at a Bar, where she befriends a thug, Puss Bag. Danny reveals (to the reader) he worked for Sadie's father as a clown (part of Sadie's dad's strange obsessions) and that is what started his fascination with her.

Danny drinks with Big C, and tells her that it was actually him who shot Sadie in the head. The two drunkenly have sex, but are interrupted by Maxim, the leader of the Pinkertons. He castrates Danny and rapes Big C, but then is attacked by Donnie and Puss Bag, who stabs him in the eye, and he jumps out a window.

Danny leaves the hospital, determined to save Sadie. Puss Bag tells him that she went with Runco and Annie X to steal the painting. In flashbacks, Sadie is getting shot in the head. She killed a man (though she claimed he was one of the 'Spiders from Mars') and Danny helped her cover it up. Sadie constantly belittles Danny and in a rage, he chases her down and shoots her.

Meanwhile, Runco and Annie contact the Pinkertons in hopes that they will be rewarded, but instead get captured. When the others arrive, Runco gets killed, and the Pinkertons demand to know where Sadie is. Sadie drives through the window on a motorcycle and kills all the Pinkertons. Immediately after, she has a stroke resulting from the bullet lodged in her brain and collapses. Danny attempts to kill himself, but Puss Bag knocks him out.

In an odd flashback, Sadie is on Mars, where the Spider race is planning to use her to lay thousands of eggs and amass an army to conquer the earth. She listens to the Earth DJ Danny Duoshade, and wins a contest to go to a concert. She stows away on a flying saucer heading to Earth, and causes it to crash land. She takes a spider form and possesses a young girl, whose parents look like Danny and Big C, but other spiders have also survived, including Sadie's father, who impregnates her with eggs. The DJ Danny Duoshade (who also looks like Danny) arrives, and Sadie is able to acquire a gun from him. She kills all but five of the Hatchlings, and vows to get the others.

Back in "the real world", Danny reveals (to the reader) that he created the Duoshade identity to try to manipulate Sadie and bring her out of the coma. Danny, Puss Bag, and Sadie visit her mother, as Sadie wants to destroy all of the 'Martian spiders'. In a gunfight, Sadie's mother and brother are killed and the group escapes.

Two flashbacks reveal that Cee was once pregnant and miscarried, and manipulated Danny into sleeping with her so she'd have leverage against Danny. She later miscarries again and saves the fetus' developed arm and keeps it in a box. Danny finds out, and throws it in a garbage disposal. CeeCee is sent away and returns later, not recalling sleeping with Danny or the fetus's arm.

Returning to the present, Sadie and her friends stage a showdown against the Pinkertons at her father's home. In the midst of the ensuing carnage, where Puss, Jackie, C, and Donnie all die, Danny commands the Pinkertons to release Sadie, shedding his shirt to show his burn scars and a spider tattoo underneath it, declaring himself the King of all Spiders.

He is then killed by Sadie, and events show Danny at a home for the mentally disturbed and interviewing a psychiatrist. Danny is told that Sadie Dawkins died at age 6, CeeCee doesn't know the name of Danny Noonan, and can only identify his face as a possible rapist. Danny is somewhat startled by this, and eventually he is sent home under observation, where his father, mother, and brother are all okay. He goes to stalk CeeCee, and she screams when she sees him. He runs away, and eventually encounters Donnie, Runco, and Annie X, all alive, but not wanting anything to do with him. He then skips town to Browning, Arizona, the home of Sadie's sister Loreli. He introduces himself as "Johnny Jukebox".

Six months later, "Johnny" and Loreli are together, and he is a musical hit along with his best friend, Kenny (engaged to Joannie), suddenly resurrected. "Johnny" is able to do what he wants in the tiny town thanks to his big time popularity, but Kenny is beaten. At one point, he sets fire to his house, only to have it miraculously undamaged and even cleaned when he returns home. He asks Loreli to marry him.

Danny lives through a haze of drugs from a nurse, Jackie (Annie X), and when he stops taking them, he begins to recall the "real" events of his life and that his real name is Danny. He threatens Loreli, forcing her to put a wig and racing jacket on, but she can't recall anything about him. Jackie reveals that she is working for the spiders, but is a double agent feeding him information. He begins to try to leave Browning along with Loreli, but is constantly thwarted until he confronts some of the local enforcement, who shoot her. He escapes, and finds a wall. Tearing through it, he witnesses some events pertaining to his job as a clown.

When Danny angers Loreli after leaving her for dead, she has hooked up with Puss Bag. She tells him that Danny is always talking to some spider named Jackie. Jackie is carried off, and Danny shows Loreli that he has killed Puss Bag. The two notice a spider was in his skull after all, and they blow up the house to kill it.

Events then shift to years before when Browning, Arizona was just Freedom, an area near an Indian reservation. There, Ronald (Danny's former boss at the Brown Bag) and Joanie (his friend) live with their diabetic mother. Ronald uses his college funds to create a sandwich shop, and Joanie eventually leaves for a while. She comes back with the wealthy Brown Bag owner, claiming him as their father, and a Brown Bag superstore is opened in Freedom. Joanie begins stealing and getting away with many crimes, even helping her boyfriend Kenny steal things. Their mother is put on a waiting list for new kidneys. Joanie then loses her newfound privileges when she tells her family that she lied and said that she was the missing Brown Bag daughter, Loreli, who has returned. Angered by many events caused by Brown Bag appearing, Ron spits in Loreli's sandwich, and to pay him back she has the Bag open a cheap sandwich shop that closes his and she removes Joanie's mother from a kidney waiting list, which causes her to die. Ron becomes a manager at the Brown Bag.

In the present, Danny wakes up in a hospital after having a strange dream about himself interviewing Danny Duoshade, who is speaking for David Lapham and saying people didn't really get what he was saying. Danny tells Loreli he realized some things, and that many of the people they know in Browning are actually his "real life" friends, Runco, Annie, and Donnie. He is unable to find the "real" CeeCee, but eventually Annie sends her over to Browning. Danny says he saw a harsh wake up call through the wall earlier, and that he is a monster. He saw himself as a clown, raping Sadie. CeeCee tells Danny and the others that they must blow up the town to kill all of the Spiders from Mars.

While the group is talking, the Pinkertons show up, saying Sadie is hard to find, after Danny nearly kisses CeeCee. Loreli runs off and comes back, violently killing all the Pinkertons and saying she has found herself as Sadie. Danny is ready to blow up the place and leave, but CeeCee says they must kill every spider, and he is one of them. He eventually submits, and Donnie gets high. Sadie tells him that she loves him, whoever he is, when the bomb goes off. A note appears, saying "I never lied to you".

Danny then wakes up in bed with a spider beneath his head, and proceeds to put on clown makeup, back in Sadie's home.

== Collected editions ==
The series is collected into trade paperbacks:

#	Title	Release date	Collected material	Pages	ISBN
1	Daydream Believer	December 2008	Issues #1–6	144	ISBN 1-4012-1978-0
2	Maestro	June 10, 2009	Issues #7–12	144	ISBN 1-4012-2272-2
3	Rock Life	January 12, 2010	Issues #13–18	144	ISBN 1-4012-2601-9

== See also ==
- Transgressive fiction
