= ACME Comics & Collectibles =

Coordinates: 42.5080°N 96.4048°W

- Type: Private
- Industry: Comics; Games; Collectibles
- Genre: Retail
- Founded: April 1, 1995; 31 years ago in Sioux City, Iowa, United States
- Founder: Fran and Kevin McGarry
- Headquarters: Sioux City, Iowa, United States
- Number of locations: 1
- Area served: Sioux City, Iowa
- Key people: Fran McGarry; Kevin McGarry
- Owner: Fran and Kevin McGarry
- Number of employees: 4–5
- Website: AcmeFirst.net

ACME Comics & Collectibles is a comics and collectibles store in Sioux City, Iowa. The store was awarded the 2004 "Spirit of Comics Retailer Award" at the Eisner Awards.

== History ==
The store was first established on April 1, 1995, by Fran and Kevin McGarry and is located on Pierce Street in Sioux City. Its selection of comic books and graphic novels come from 79 different publishers, ranging from major industry names such as Marvel Comics and DC Comics to small independent publishers. The store also carries a variety of other items, including collectible statues with Star Wars, Star Trek, Dragons, Fairies, and comic book themes; toys from MacFarlane Sports, MacFarlane Dragons, DC Direct, Marvel Select, Pirates of the Caribbean, etc.; artwork and collectible plates; trading cards that range from football, baseball, and hockey to Yu-Gi-Oh!, World of Warcraft, and Magic: The Gathering; games such as Munchkin and Dungeons & Dragons; and a variety of fantasy and Renaissance themed T-shirts, statues, and other paraphernalia.

== Events ==
ACME Comics & Collectibles participates in Free Comic Book Day every year. The store has also hosted several autograph signings from notable people such as Star Wars actors Peter Mayhew, who played Chewbacca, and Daniel Logan, who played Boba Fett. ACME Comics has also hosted an autograph-signing with best-selling author Jesse Leon McCann, author of the Krypto the Superdog comic book.

== Awards ==
In 2004, ACME Comics & Collectibles won the Will Eisner Spirit of Comics Retailer Award from Comic-Con International in San Diego, California, after being a runner-up for the Eisner Award in 2002 and 2003. The award was presented by Joe Ferrara, owner of the Atlantis Fantasyworld comic book store in Santa Cruz, California. Named for comic book creator Will Eisner, the "Will Eisner Spirit of Comics Retailer Award" recognizes "an individual retailer who has done an outstanding job of supporting the comics art medium both in the community and within the industry at large". U.S. Senators Chuck Grassley and Tom Harkin, Iowa Governor Tom Vilsack, Sioux City Mayor Dave Ferris, the Siouxland Chamber of Commerce, and House Speaker of Sioux City Christopher Rants, an ACME Comics customer, all wrote letters of support.
