= Nero (comics) =

Nero, in comics, may refer:

- Nero (DC Comics), a DC Comics character.
- Nero of The Adventures of Nero, in Flemish: De Avonturen van Detectief Van Zwam and De Avonturen van Nero & Co

== See also ==
- Nero (disambiguation)
- Neron, a DC Comics supervillain
