= Starfleet International Conference =

The STARFLEET International Conference is the annual business conference where members of STARFLEET: The International Star Trek Fan Association, Inc. meet the organization's leadership. The conference includes leadership meetings, information sessions, a formal banquet, an awards ceremony, and other events and entertainment.

== History ==
STARFLEET is a nonprofit corporation based in North Carolina, and the conference also serves as the required annual meeting of the corporation where members of the Board of Directors, referred to as the Admiralty Board, and the officers of the corporation, known as the Executive Committee, meet in session. Initially called the National Conference, the International Conference has been hosted in the United States because the majority of STARFLEET's membership resides in that country. Most conferences are stand-alone events, but some have been associated with nearby conventions. Conference guests have included Vaughn Armstrong, Casey Biggs, Robin Curtis, Richard Herd, J. G. Hertzler, Chase Masterson, Colm Meaney, Tim Russ, Roger Stern and Fred W. Haise.

== Locations ==
Year	Dates	City	Notes
1986	June 13-15	St. Louis, Missouri	1st Starfleet Conference, held at the Clarion Hotel in association with Archon 10 fan convention
1987	July 10-12	Hunt Valley, Maryland	Held in association with Shore Leave IX
1988	June 16-19	Cleveland, Ohio	Held at the Cleveland Convention Center, this National Conference was combined with International Superman Convention and the 7th annual Neovention gaming convention.
1989	August 25-27	San Jose, California	Held in association with TimeCon 89
1990	August 31 to September 2	Kansas City, Missouri	Held in association with Delecon One
1991	July 12-14	Hunt Valley, Maryland	Held again at the Hunt Valley Inn, in association with Shore Leave XIII
1992	July 3-5	Kansas City, Missouri	Held in association with Delecon Two. Special charity events at the 1992 IC raised money to benefit the Children's Miracle Network
1993	July 2-4	Arlington, Texas	Held at the Arlington Convention Center, the IC was branded as "Tex-Trek '93" and some events were opened to the public. Guests included actor Colm Meaney.
1994	July 17-19	Orlando, Florida	Held in conjunction with Vulkon 94
1995	July 13-16	Atlanta, Georgia	Held in conjunction with Dragon Con/NASFIC
1996	August 30 to September 1	Oklahoma City, Oklahoma	
1997	August 22-24	Cherry Hill, New Jersey	
1998	July 3-5	Lubbock, Texas	
1999	August 6-8	Charlotte, North Carolina	
2000	September 1-3	Burlington, Vermont	
2001	July 27-29	Kansas City, Missouri	
2002	August 1-4	San Jose, California	
2003	July 31 to August 3	Greensboro, North Carolina	
2004	July 29 to August 1	Birmingham, Alabama	
2005	July 1-3	San Antonio, Texas	Guests included Richard Herd, Vaughn Armstrong, and Casey Biggs
2006	August 4-6	Philadelphia, Pennsylvania	
2007	August 9-12	Denver, Colorado	
2008	June 27-29	Ithaca, New York	This IC's theme was "Back to School" and special guests included actors J. G. Hertzler and Robin Curtis, and Superman author Roger Stern.
2009	August 6-9	Greensboro, North Carolina	With the theme "One Small Step, One Giant Leap", this IC celebrated the 40th anniversary of the Apollo 11 Moon landing as well as the 35th Anniversary of STARFLEET International. The special guest was Apollo 13 astronaut Fred W. Haise.
2010	July 30 to August 1	Sequoyah State Park, Wagoner, Oklahoma	The "Wagon Train to the Stars" theme reflects the Oklahoma setting and echoes a phrase Gene Roddenberry used to describe Star Trek to television network executives.
2011	August 12-14	Mount Pocono, Pennsylvania	
2012	August 3-5	Memphis, Tennessee	"Trekkin' on the Mississippi" - Included Guest: Rod Roddenberry
2013	August 1-4	Dallas, Texas	"Year of the Phoenix" - Included Guest: Vaughn Armstrong
2014	August 8-10	Rockford, Illinois	"Time is Fleeting", Celebrating the 40th Anniversary of STARFLEET: The International Star Trek Fan Association, Inc.
2015	August 21-23	Niagara Falls, New York	"Honeymoon in STARFLEET"
2016	August 12-14	Louisville, Kentucky	"Trekkin' II: Horsing around on the Ohio!"
2017	August 18-20	New Orleans, Louisiana	
2018	August 10-12	Minneapolis, Minnesota	"Family Reunion"
2019	August 2-5	St. Louis, Missouri	
2020	August 1		Hosted online due to the COVID-19 pandemic
2021	August 7		Hosted online due to the COVID-19 pandemic
2022	August 13		Hosted online due to the COVID-19 pandemic
2023			Hosted online due to the COVID-19 pandemic
2024	August 2-4	Atlanta, Georgia	
