= Dark Dominion =

American comic book series

Publication information
- Publisher: Defiant Comics

Creative team
- Created by: Jim Shooter (writer); Steve Ditko (artist)

Dark Dominion is an American comic book series that was published monthly by Defiant Comics from October 1993 to July 1994. It spanned a total of 10 issues until Defiant ceased publication. There was one #0 issue published as a trading card set and binder.

Dark Dominion was created by Jim Shooter and Steve Ditko, the co-creator of Spider-Man. The concept was based on Shooter's idea that "fear is the root of all evil", and dealt with Shooter's fascination with quantum mechanics.

== Characters ==
- Michael Alexander: The protagonist of the series.
- Chasm: The main antagonist of the series.

== Plot synopsis ==
The comic is set in Manhattan and features the main character Michael Alexander, who is the author of a book entitled Dark Dominion, in which he explores the idea that another world occupies the same spacetime as our own. On this alternate world, which houses the sub-stratum of our world, demons arise from the fears of human beings. The only way to see this hidden world is to put aside one's fears.

The main villain, Chasm, has chosen Manhattan to be his headquarters on Earth because of the vast population on whose fears he could draw from.

Michael Alexander is not afraid to face Chasm and the demons of the Dark Dominion. He perceives this alternate dimension as an energy-filled double of our own, with various demonic-type bits of architecture added to it. Monsters tended to ride the very humans they afflicted. This is seen in a crossover with another Defiant title, Charlemagne, when he tears creatures from the minds of affected dockworkers. The same issue sees Michael befriending a super-powered 'fish out of water' named Charles.

== Aftermath ==
The story of Dark Dominion was only published for ten issues. Four more issues were solicited, and one more issue was produced, but due to the closing of the company, they were never released. According to Shooter, Defiant ran out of money sometime in 1994.

Afterwards, all their comics ceased to be published and the characters - including those of Dark Dominion - were purchased by Golden Books. The rights have since shifted to Random House. Shooter expressed an interest in re-visiting the characters and story.
