= Warriors of Plasm =

American comic book series

Warriors of Plasm was the flagship title of Jim Shooter's Defiant Comics comic book company.

Besides the original first issue (#1) of the comic (1993), there was also a zero issue (#0) of Warriors of Plasm which was released as an insert in Previews magazine, and as a trading card set that could be put together in a binder to be read as a comic. There was also a Warriors of Plasm graphic novel titled Home for the Holidays, published in between issues #5 and #6.

== Legal battle ==
Originally called Plasm, the title was changed after Marvel Comics threatened Defiant Comics with a lawsuit over a similarly titled series, Plasmer.

Jim Shooter changed the name to Warriors of Plasm in an attempt to avoid any further legal issues with Marvel, but Defiant Comics still wound up defending themselves in a court battle with Marvel over the name.

Defiant Comics won in court, but had spent over $300,000 in legal fees to defend itself. The loss of capital would help lead to Defiant's eventual collapse.

== Publication history ==
Warriors of Plasm was published for a total of 13 issues from August 1993 to August 1994. Most of the books were written by Jim Shooter and illustrated by David Lapham. Shooter had discovered Lapham during his tenure as editor-in-chief of Valiant Comics.

The series also featured the talents of Len Wein, a former editor-in-chief at Marvel Comics, and Dave Cockrum, who helped co-create many of the "new" X-Men at Marvel Comics with Chris Claremont.

The final issue of Warriors of Plasm was one of only two books published by Defiant to carry the Schism storyline. Originally, Jim Shooter had planned to do a "crossover" including all of Defiant's titles and characters, but because of the failure of the company only Warriors of Plasm #13 and Dogs of War #5 ever saw publication.

== Plot ==
Far from Earth is a planet which is also a living organism: the Org of Plasm. The Org must constantly be fed, which is accomplished by conquering new planets. Lorca, the Supreme Acquisitor, leads this mission, and soon sets his sights on Earth.

He, however, devises an attempt to overthrow the rulers of Plasm. To do so he genetically modifies five humans. When his rebellion is thwarted, he sends them home. These humans gain superpowers and then set themselves in preparation to attempt to defend the Earth from the oncoming alien invasion from Plasm. The humans do not function well together, suffering leadership conflicts and the desire to regain their normal lives.

== Characters ==
On Plasm, the main characters are:

- Lorca is the Supreme Acquisitor on the Org of Plasm. He seeks out other planets for the living Org of Plasm to consume.
- Sueraceen is the High Gore-Lord of Plasm, its chief military officer.
- Ulnareah is the Grand Inquisitor of Plasm. He serves under Lorca but has his ambitions set much higher.

The five genetically altered superheroes are all residents of New Jersey. They are:

- Glory – a.k.a. "Mrs. J"; Louise Johnson, a married grandmother of two.
- Preach – Reverend Martin Gilbert, the bishop of a New Jersey church.
- Shooter – Elvis Mazerov, an ex-military officer.
- Mouse – Rick Tietz, a large, shy auto-mechanic.
- Nudge – Cookie Wazenegger, a quiet, polite girl who works at a cosmetics counter.
