= Noir: A Collection of Crime Comics =

2009 graphic novel

- Cover.
- Date: October 21, 2009
- Page count: 104 pages
- Publisher: Dark Horse Comics
- ISBN: 978-1595823588

Noir: A Collection of Crime Comics is a black-and-white crime comics anthology published by Dark Horse Comics. The collection contains original stories as well as short stories of already established crime comics series.

== Stories ==
=== "Stray Bullets: Open the Goddamn Box" ===
Writer and artist: David Lapham

Letterer: Clem Robins

=== "The Old Silo" ===
Writer and artist: Jeff Lemire

=== "Mister X: Yacht on the Styx" ===
Writer and artist: Dean Motter

=== "The Last Hit" ===
Writer: Chris Offutt

Penciller: Kano

Inker: Stefano Gaudiano

Letterer: Clem Robins

=== "Fracture" ===
Writer: Alex De Campi

Artist: Hugo Petrus

Letterer: Ryan Hill

=== "The Albanian" ===
Writer and artist: M. K. Perker

=== "Kane: The Card Player" ===
Writer and artist: Paul Grist

=== "Blood on My Hands" ===
Writer and artist: Rick Geary

=== "Trustworthy" ===
Prose story with illustrations

Writer: Ken Lizzi

Artist: Joëlle Jones

=== "The New Me" ===
Writer: Gary D. Phillips

Artist: Eduardo Barreto

Letterer: Tom Orzechowski

=== "Lady's Choice" ===
Writers and artists: The Fillbach Brothers

=== "Criminal: 21st Century Noir" ===
Writer: Ed Brubaker

Artist: Sean Phillips

=== "The Bad Night" ===
Writer: Brian Azzarello

Artists: Gabriel Bá and Fábio Moon
