= Defiant Comics =

American comic book publishing imprint

- Founded: 1993
- Founder: Jim Shooter
- Defunct: 1995
- Country of origin: United States
- Headquarters location: New York City
- Publication types: Comics

Defiant Comics was a comic book publishing imprint of Enlightened Entertainment Partners, LP. Defiant was established in 1993 by former Marvel Comics and Valiant Comics editor-in-chief Jim Shooter.

== Publication history ==
Defiant was founded one year after Jim Shooter's departure from Valiant Comics. After attempting unsuccessfully to retain his partial ownership of Voyager Communications (Valiant's parent company) Shooter founded a new company that included some Valiant artists and writers on its staff. He formed a business venture with The River Group to help finance Defiant.

In early 1993, Defiant announced that its first title, Plasm, would be released as a series of trading cards that could be put together in an album to form "issue #0". Upon hearing the news, Marvel Comics threatened a lawsuit against Defiant, claiming the new title violated a Marvel UK trademark for their book/character Plasmer. Though Defiant changed the title to Warriors of Plasm, Marvel continued its lawsuit. While the court eventually ruled in favor of Defiant, the legal process depleted the company's capital, having cost over $300,000 in legal fees. Defiant ceased publication in Summer 1995.

== Announced plans ==
Shooter had originally planned to publish an intracompany "crossover" featuring all the characters and titles in the self-contained Defiant universe, similar to the Secret Wars crossover miniseries he had done at Marvel and the Unity crossover miniseries he had also completed before his dismissal at Valiant. To have been titled "Schism", the crossover was intended to take place in a four-issue miniseries, with the regular ongoing titles retelling the parts relevant to the respective characters of each. Only two crossover-related issues (Dogs of War #5 and Warriors of Plasm #13) were published before the company went out of business. The plots for the miniseries were eventually posted online.

== Titles ==
=== Initial ===
- Dark Dominion
- The Good Guys
- Warriors of Plasm (originally Plasm)

=== Second wave ===
- Charlemagne
- Dogs of War
- Prudence & Caution
- War Dancer

=== One-shots ===
- The Birth of The Defiant Universe
- Glory
- Great Grimmax
- The Origin of The Defiant Universe aka Defiant Genesis
- Splatterball

=== Graphic novels ===
- Warriors of Plasm – Home For the Holidays (officially titled as Warriors of Plasm Graphic Novel #1 in the comic's legal indicia)

=== Trade paperback ===
- Warriors of Plasm: The Collected Edition (Feb. 1994) (reprints Warriors of Plasm #0–4 and Splatterball)
