= List of Marvel Comics publications (N–R) =

Alphabetical list of Marvel Comics

Marvel Comics is an American comic book company dating to 1961. This is a list of the publications it has released in its history under the "Marvel Comics" imprint. The list does not include collected editions; trade paperbacks; digital comics; free, promotional giveaways; sketchbooks; poster books or magazines, nor does it include series published by other Marvel imprints such as Epic, Icon or Star. It also does not include titles published by Marvel's pre-1961 predecessors Timely Comics and Atlas Comics.

- List of Marvel Comics publications (A)
- List of Marvel Comics publications (B–C)
- List of Marvel Comics publications (D–E)
- List of Marvel Comics publications (F–G)
- List of Marvel Comics publications (H–L)
- List of Marvel Comics publications (M)
- List of Marvel Comics publications (S)
- List of Marvel Comics publications (T–V)
- List of Marvel Comics publications (W–Z)

== N ==
Title	Series	Issues	Dates	Notes	Reference
The 'Nam		#1–84	Dec 1986 – Sep 1993		
Namor	vol. 1	#1–12	Jun 2003 – May 2004		
Namor	vol. 2	#1–8	Sep 2024 – May 2025	limited series	
Namor	Conquered Shores	#1–5	Dec 2022 – Apr 2023	limited series	
Namor	The Sub-Mariner	#1–62	Apr 1990 – May 1995		
Namor	The Sub-Mariner	Annual #1–4	1991 – 1994		
Namor	The First Mutant	#1–11	Oct 2010 – Aug 2011		
Namor	The First Mutant	Annual #1	Jul 2011		
Namora	vol. 2	#1	Aug 2010	one-shot; previous series published by Timely Comics	
Nation X		#1–4	Feb 2010 – May 2010	limited series	
Nation X	X-Factor	#1	Mar 2010	one-shot	
Nebula		#1–2	Apr 2020 – May 2020	limited series; originally solicited as 5-issue series	
Negasonic Teenage Warhead		#1	Jan 2025	one-shot	
New Avengers	vol. 1	#1–64	Jan 2005 – Jun 2010		
New Avengers	vol. 1	Annual #1–3	Jun 2006 – Feb 2010		
New Avengers	vol. 1	Finale #1	Jun 2010		
New Avengers	vol. 2	#1–34; 16.1	Aug 2010 – Jan 2013		
New Avengers	vol. 2	Annual #1	Nov 2011		
New Avengers	vol. 3	#1–33	Mar 2013 – Jun 2015		
New Avengers	vol. 3	Annual #1	Aug 2014		
New Avengers	vol. 4	#1–18	Dec 2015 – Jan 2017		
New Avengers	vol. 5	#1–10	Aug 2025 – May 2026		
New Avengers	Illuminati vol. 1	#1	May 2006	one-shot	
New Avengers	Illuminati vol. 2	#1–5	Feb 2007 – Jan 2008	limited series	
New Avengers	Luke Cage	#1–3	Jun 2010 – Aug 2010	limited series	
New Avengers	Most Wanted Files	#1	Feb 2006	one-shot	
New Avengers	The Reunion	#1–4	May 2009 – Aug 2009	limited series; Dark Reign tie-in	
New Avengers	Ultron Forever	#1	Jun 2015	one-shot	
New Avengers/Transformers		#1–4	Sep 2007 – Dec 2007	limited series; co-published with IDW	
New Champions		#1–8	Mar 2025 – Oct 2025		
The New Eternals: Apocalypse Now		#1	Feb 2000	one-shot	
New Excalibur		#1–24	Jan 2006 – Dec 2007		
New Exiles		#0–18	Mar 2008 – Apr 2009		
New Exiles		Annual #1	Feb 2009		
New Fantastic Four		#1–5	Aug 2022 – Dec 2022	limited series	
New-Gen		#1–6	Apr 2008 – Jul 2010	limited series	
New-Gen	New Dawn	#1–2	Oct 2011 – Nov 2011	limited series	
The New Invaders		#0–9	Aug 2004 – Jun 2005		
New Mangaverse		#1–5	Mar 2006 – Jul 2006	limited series	
New Mutants	vol. 1	#1–100	Mar 1983 – Apr 1991	titled The New Mutants	
New Mutants	vol. 1	Annual #1–7	1984 – 1991	titled The New Mutants	
New Mutants	vol. 1	Special Edition #1	1985	titled The New Mutants	
New Mutants	vol. 1	Summer Special #1	1990	titled The New Mutants	
New Mutants	vol. 2	#1–13	Jul 2003 – Jun 2004		
New Mutants	vol. 3	#1–50	Jul 2009 – Nov 2012		
New Mutants	vol. 4	#1–33	Jan 2020 – Feb 2023		
New Mutants	Dead Souls	#1–6	May 2018 – Oct 2018	limited series	
New Mutants	Forever	#1–5	Oct 2010 – Feb 2011	limited series	
New Mutants	Lethal Legion	#1–5	May 2023 – Sep 2023	limited series	
New Mutants	Truth or Death	#1–3	Nov 1997 – Jan 1998	limited series	
New Mutants	War Children	#1	Nov 2019	one-shot	
New Thunderbolts		#1–18	Jan 2005 – Apr 2006	continued from Thunderbolts vol. 1; dual numbered #82–99; continued as Thunderbolts vol. 2	
New Warriors	vol. 1	#1–75	Jul 1990 – Sep 1996	titled "The New Warriors"	
New Warriors	vol. 1	Annual #1–4	1991 – 1994	titled "The New Warriors"	
New Warriors	vol. 2	#1–10	Oct 1999 – Jul 2000		
New Warriors	vol. 3	#1–6	Aug 2005 – Feb 2006	limited series	
New Warriors	vol. 4	#1–20	Aug 2007 – Mar 2009		
New Warriors	vol. 5	#1–12	Apr 2014 – Jan 2015		
New X-Men	vol. 1	#114–156	Jul 2001 – Jun 2004	continued from X-Men vol. 2; continued as X-Men vol. 3	
New X-Men	vol. 1	2001	2001	Annual	
New X-Men	vol. 2	#1–46	Jul 2004 – Mar 2008		
New X-Men	Academy X Yearbook	#1	Dec 2005	one-shot	
New X-Men	Hellions	#1–4	Jul 2005 – Oct 2005	limited series	
newuniversal		#1–6	Feb 2007 – Jul 2007		
newuniversal	1959	#1	Sep 2008	one-shot	
newuniversal	Conqueror	#1	Oct 2008	one-shot	
newuniversal	Shockfront	#1–2	Jul 2008 – Aug 2008	limited series	
Nextwave: Agents of H.A.T.E.		#1–12	Mar 2006 – Mar 2007		
NFL SuperPro		#1–12	Oct 1991 – Sep 1992		
NFL SuperPro	Super Bowl Special		Mar 1991	one-shot	
Nick Fury		#1–6	Jun 2017 – Nov 2017		
Nick Fury, Agent of S.H.I.E.L.D.	vol. 1	#1–18	Jun 1968 – Mar 1971		
Nick Fury, Agent of S.H.I.E.L.D.	vol. 2	#1–2	Dec 1983 – Jan 1984	limited series	
Nick Fury, Agent of S.H.I.E.L.D.	vol. 3	#1–47	Sep 1989 – May 1993		
Nick Fury vs. Fin Fang Foom		#1	May 2025	one-shot	
Nick Fury vs. S.H.I.E.L.D.		#1–6	Jun 1988 – Nov 1988	limited series	
Nick Fury's Howling Commandos		#1–6	Dec 2005 – May 2006		
Night Nurse		#1–4	Nov 1972 – May 1973		
Night of the Living Deadpool		#1–4	Mar 2014 – May 2014	limited series	
Night Rider		#1–6	Oct 1974 – Aug 1975		
Night Thrasher	vol. 1	#1–21	Aug 1993 – Apr 1995		
Night Thrasher	vol. 2	#1–4	Apr 2024 – Jul 2024	limited series	
Night Thrasher	Four Control	#1–4	Oct 1992 – Jan 1993	limited series	
Nightcat		#1	Apr 1991	one-shot	
Nightcrawler	vol. 1	#1–4	Nov 1985 – Feb 1986	limited series	
Nightcrawler	vol. 2	#1–4	Feb 2002 – May 2002	limited series	
Nightcrawler	vol. 3	#1–12	Nov 2004 – Jan 2006		
Nightcrawler	vol. 4	#1–12	Jun 2014 – May 2015		
Nightcrawlers		#1–3	Apr 2023 – Jun 2023	limited series; Sins of Sinister tie-in	
Nighthawk	vol. 1	#1–3	Sep 1998 – Nov 1998	limited series	
Nighthawk	vol. 2	#1–6	Jul 2016 – Dec 2016	limited series	
Nightmare		#1–4	Dec 1994 – Mar 1995	limited series	
Nightmask		#1–12	Nov 1986 – Oct 1987		
Nightside		#1–4	Dec 2001 – Mar 2002	limited series	
Nightstalkers		#1–18	Nov 1992 – Apr 1994		
Nightwatch		#1–12	Apr 1994 – Mar 1995		
No Escape		#1–3	Jun 1994 – Aug 1994	limited series; movie adaptation	
Nocturne		#1–4	Jun 1995 – Sep 1995	limited series	
Nomad	vol. 1	#1–4	Nov 1990 – Feb 1991	limited series	
Nomad	vol. 2	#1–25	May 1992 – May 1994		
Nomad	Girl Without a World	#1–4	Nov 2009 – Feb 2010	limited series	
Non-Stop Spider-Man		#1–5	May 2021 – Nov 2021		
Northanger Abbey		#1–5	Jan 2012 – May 2012	limited series	
Northstar		#1–4	Apr 1994 – Jul 1994	limited series	
Not Brand Echh		#1–13	Aug 1967 – May 1969		
Not Brand Echh		#14	Jan 2018	one-shot; part of Marvel Legacy event	
Nova	vol. 1	#1–25	Sep 1976 – May 1979		
Nova	vol. 2	#1–18	Jan 1994 – Jun 1995		
Nova	vol. 3	#1–7	May 1999 – Nov 1999		
Nova	vol. 4	#1–36	Jun 2007 – Jun 2010		
Nova	vol. 4	Annual #1	Apr 2008		
Nova	vol. 5	#1–31	Apr 2013 – Jul 2015		
Nova	vol. 5	Annual #1	May 2015		
Nova	vol. 5	Special #1	Oct 2014		
Nova	vol. 6	#1–11	Jan 2016 – Dec 2016		
Nova	vol. 7	#1–7	Feb 2017 – Jun 2017		
Nova	Centurion	#1–6	Jan 2026 – Jun 2026		
Nova	Return of the Rings	#1	Dec 2026	one-shot	
Nova	The Origin of Richard Rider	#1	Mar 2009	one-shot	
Nth Man: The Ultimate Ninja		#1–16	Aug 1989 – Sep 1990		
NYX	vol. 1	#1–7	Nov 2003 – Oct 2005	limited series	
NYX	vol. 2	#1–10	Sep 2024 – Jun 2025	limited series	
NYX	No Way Home	#1–6	Oct 2008 – Apr 2009	limited series	

== O ==
Title	Series	Issues	Dates	Notes	Reference
Obi-Wan and Anakin		#1–5	Mar 2016 – Jul 2016	limited series; also known as Star Wars: Obi-Wan and Anakin	
Obnoxio the Clown		#1	Apr 1983	one-shot	
Occupy Avengers		#1–9	Jan 2017 – Jul 2017		
Official Handbook of the Marvel Universe	vol. 1	#1–15	Jan 1983 – May 1984	limited series	
Official Handbook of the Marvel Universe	vol. 2 (Deluxe Edition)	#1–20	Dec 1985 – Feb 1988	limited series	
Official Handbook of the Marvel Universe	vol. 3 (Update)	#1–8	Jul 1989 – Dec 1989	limited series	
Official Handbook of the Marvel Universe	vol. 4 (Master Edition)	#1–36	Dec 1990 – Nov 1993	limited series	
Official Handbook of the Marvel Universe	vol. 5 (A to Z)	#1–14	Mar 2008 – Jun 2010	limited series	
Official Handbook of the Marvel Universe	vol. 6 (A to Z Update)	#1–5	Apr 2010 – Dec 2010	limited series	
Official Handbook of the Marvel Universe	Alternate Universes		Sep 2006	one-shot	
Official Handbook of the Marvel Universe	Avengers vol. 1	2004	Jul 2004	one-shot	
Official Handbook of the Marvel Universe	Avengers vol. 2	2005	Jul 2005	one-shot	
Official Handbook of the Marvel Universe	Book of the Dead	2004	Nov 2004	one-shot	
Official Handbook of the Marvel Universe	Daredevil	2004	Nov 2004	one-shot	
Official Handbook of the Marvel Universe	Fantastic Four	2005	Jun 2005	one-shot	
Official Handbook of the Marvel Universe	Golden Age	2004	Dec 2004	one-shot	
Official Handbook of the Marvel Universe	Horror	2005	Oct 2005	one-shot	
Official Handbook of the Marvel Universe	Hulk	2004	Aug 2004	one-shot	
Official Handbook of the Marvel Universe	Marvel Knights	2005	Feb 2005	one-shot	
Official Handbook of the Marvel Universe	Mystic Arcana - The Book of Marvel Magic	2007	Jun 2007	one-shot	
Official Handbook of the Marvel Universe	Spider-Man vol. 1	2004	Jun 2004	one-shot	
Official Handbook of the Marvel Universe	Spider-Man vol. 2	2005	Apr 2005	one-shot	
Official Handbook of the Marvel Universe	Spider-Man: Back In Black Handbook	2007	Jun 2007	one-shot	
Official Handbook of the Marvel Universe	Teams	2005	May 2005	one-shot	
Official Handbook of the Marvel Universe	Wolverine	2004	Oct 2004	one-shot	
Official Handbook of the Marvel Universe	The Women of Marvel	2005	Jan 2005	one-shot	
Official Handbook of the Marvel Universe	X-Men vol. 1	2004	May 2004	one-shot	
Official Handbook of the Marvel Universe	X-Men vol. 2	2005	Jan 2006	one-shot	
Official Handbook of the Marvel Universe	X-Men – Age of Apocalypse	2005	May 2005	one-shot	
Official Handbook of the Ultimate Marvel Universe	Fantastic Four & Spider-Man		2005	one-shot	
Official Handbook of the Ultimate Marvel Universe	The Ultimates & X-Men		2005	one-shot	
Official Index to the Marvel Universe		#1–14	Jan 2009 – Apr 2010	limited series	
Official Index to the Marvel Universe	Avengers, Thor & Captain America	#1–15	Jun 2010 – Sep 2011	limited series	
Official Index to the Marvel Universe	Wolverine, Punisher & Ghost Rider	#1–8	Oct 2011 – May 2012	limited series	
The Official Marvel Comics Try-Out Book		#1–2	1983 – 1996	limited series; 2nd issue titled The New Official Marvel Try-Out Book	
The Official Marvel Index to	The Amazing Spider-Man	#1–9	Apr 1985 – Dec 1985	limited series	
The Official Marvel Index to	The Avengers vol. 1	#1–7	Jun 1987 – Aug 1988	limited series	
The Official Marvel Index to	The Avengers vol. 2	#1–6	Oct 1994 – Mar 1995	limited series	
The Official Marvel Index to	The Fantastic Four	#1–12	Dec 1985 – Jan 1987	limited series	
The Official Marvel Index to	Marvel Team-Up	#1–6	Jan 1986 – Jul 1987	limited series	
The Official Marvel Index to	The X-Men vol. 1	#1–7	May 1987 – Jul 1988	limited series	
The Official Marvel Index to	The X-Men vol. 2	#1–5	Apr 1994 – Aug 1994	limited series	
Old Man Hawkeye		#1–12	Mar 2018 – Feb 2019	limited series	
Old Man Logan	vol. 1	#1–5	Jul 2015 – Dec 2015	limited series; Secret Wars (2015) tie-in	
Old Man Logan	vol. 2	#1–50	Mar 2016 – Dec 2018		
Old Man Logan	vol. 2	Annual #1	2018		
Old Man Quill		#1–12	Apr 2019 – Feb 2020	limited series	
Omega Flight		#1–5	Jun 2007 – Oct 2007	limited series; The Initiative tie-in	
Omega Kids		#1–3	Dec 2025 – Feb 2026	limited series; Age of Revelation tie-in	
Omega the Unknown	vol. 1	#1–10	Mar 1976 – Oct 1977		
Omega the Unknown	vol. 2	#1–10	Dec 2007 – Sep 2008	limited series	
Once Upon a Time	Out of the Past		2015	graphic novel; TV tie-in	
Once Upon a Time	Shadow of the Queen		2013	graphic novel; TV tie-in	
One World Under Doom		#1–9	Apr 2025 – Jan 2026	limited series	
Onslaught	Epilogue	#1	Feb 1997	one-shot	
Onslaught	Marvel Universe	#1	Oct 1996	one-shot	
Onslaught	Reborn	#1–5	Jan 2007 – Feb 2008	limited series	
Onslaught	Unleashed	#1–4	Apr 2011	limited series	
Onslaught	X-Men	#1	Aug 1996	one-shot	
Open Space		#1–4	Dec 1989 – Aug 1990		
Operation S.I.N.		#1–5	Mar 2015 – Jul 2015	limited series	
The Order	vol. 1	#1–6	Apr 2002 – Sep 2002	limited series; continued from Defenders vol. 2; dual numbered as #13–18	
The Order	vol. 2	#1–10	Sep 2007 – Jun 2008		
Origin II		#1–5	Feb 2014 – Jun 2014	limited series	
The Origin of Galactus		#1	Feb 1996	one-shot	
The Original Ghost Rider		#1–20	Jul 1992 – Feb 1994		
The Original Ghost Rider	Rides Again	#1–7	Jul 1991 – Jan 1992	limited series	
Original Sin		#0–8; 3.1–3.4; 5.1–5.5	Jun 2014 – Nov 2014	limited series	
Original Sin		Annual #1	Dec 2014	limited series	
Original Sins		#1–5	Aug 2014 – Oct 2014	limited series	
Original X-Men		#1	Feb 2024	one-shot	
Origins of Marvel Comics		#1	Jul 2010	one-shot	
Origins of Marvel Comics	X-Men	#1	Nov 2010	one-shot	
Origins of Siege		#1	Feb 2010	one-shot	
Origins of The Hood: Marvel Rivals		#1	Oct 2026	one-shot; video game tie-in	
Ororo: Before the Storm		#1–4	Aug 2005 – Nov 2005	limited series	
Orson Scott Card's	Ender in Exile	#1–5	Aug 2010 – Dec 2010	limited series	
Orson Scott Card's	Speaker for the Dead	#1–5	Mar 2011 – Jul 2011	limited series	
Osborn		#1–5	Jan 2011 – Jun 2011	limited series	
Our Love Story		#1–38	Oct 1969 – Feb 1976		
The Outlaw Kid	vol. 2	#1–30	Aug 1970 – Oct 1975	vol. 1 published by Atlas Comics	
Outlawed		#1	May 2020	one-shot	
Over the Edge		#1–10	Nov 1995 – Aug 1996		
Oz Primer			Mar 2011	one-shot	
Ozma of Oz		#1–8	Jan 2011 – Sep 2011	limited series	

== P ==
Title	Series	Issues	Dates	Notes	Reference
Paradise X		#0–12	Apr 2002 – Aug 2003	limited series	
Paradise X	A	#1	Oct 2003	one-shot	
Paradise X	Devils	#1	Nov 2002	one-shot	
Paradise X	Heralds	#1–3	Dec 2001 – Feb 2002	limited series	
Paradise X	Ragnarok	#1–2	Mar 2003 – Apr 2003	limited series	
Paradise X	X	#1	Nov 2003	one-shot	
Paradise X	Xen	#1	Jul 2002	one-shot	
Patsy and Hedy		#77–110	Aug 1961 – Feb 1967	previous issues in this run were published by Atlas Comics	
Patsy and Hedy		Annual #1	1963		
Patsy Walker		#95–124	Jun 1961 – Dec 1965	previous issues in this run were published by Timely Comics and Atlas Comics	
Patsy Walker	A.K.A. Hellcat	#1–17	Feb 2016 – Jun 2017		
Patsy Walker	Hellcat	#1–5	Sep 2008 – Feb 2009	limited series	
Patsy Walker's Fashion Parade		#1	1966	one-shot	
Penance: Relentless		#1–5	Nov 2007 – Apr 2008	limited series	
Pendragon		#1–4	Jul 1992 – Oct 1992	continued as Knights of Pendragon	
Peter Parker		#1–5	May 2010 – Sep 2010	limited series	
Peter Parker & Miles Morales: Spider-Men Double Trouble		#1–4	Jan 2023 – Apr 2023	limited series	
Peter Parker: Spider-Man		#1–57	Jan 1999 – Aug 2003	issues #30–57 are dual numbered as #128–155	
Peter Parker: Spider-Man		#156.1	Oct 2012		
Peter Parker: Spider-Man		1999, 2000, 2001	1999 – 2001	Annuals	
Peter Parker: The Spectacular Spider-Man	vol. 1	#1–6	Aug 2017 – Jan 2018		
Peter Parker: The Spectacular Spider-Man	vol. 2	#297–313	Jan 2018 – Feb 2019	numbering continued from vol. 1 of The Spectacular Spider-Man	
Peter Parker: The Spectacular Spider-Man	vol. 2	Annual #1	Aug 2018		
Peter, the Little Pest		#1–3	Nov 1969 – Mar 1970	continued as Petey	
Petey		#4	May 1970	continued from Peter, the Little Pest	
Petpool: Pool Party		#1	Feb 2025	one-shot	
Phantom 2040		#1–4	May 1995 – Aug 1995	limited series	
The Phantom: Ghost Who Walks		#1–3	Feb 1995 – Apr 1995	limited series	
Phases of the Moon Knight		#1–4	Oct 2024 – Jan 2025	limited series	
Phoenix	vol. 1	#1	Apr 1984	one-shot; also known as Phoenix: The Untold Story	
Phoenix	vol. 2	#1–15	Sep 2024 – Nov 2025		
Phoenix Resurrection: The Return of Jean Grey		#1–5	Feb 2018 – Mar 2018	limited series	
Phoenix Song: Echo		#1–5	Dec 2021 – Apr 2022	limited series	
The Pilgrim's Progress			Dec 1992	graphic novel adaptation	
Pinocchio and the Emperor of the Night		#1	Mar 1988	movie adaptation	
The Pirates of Dark Water		#1–9	Nov 1991 – Aug 1992	limited series	
Planet Hulk		#1–5	Jul 2015 – Nov 2015	limited series; Secret Wars (2015) tie-in	
Planet Hulk	Gladiator Guidebook		Jul 2006	one-shot	
Planet Hulk	Worldbreaker	#1–5	Jan 2023 – May 2023	limited series	
Planet of the Apes		#1–5	Jun 2023 – Oct 2023	limited series; published under the 20th Century Studios imprint	
Planet of the Apes vs. Fantastic Four		#1–4	Apr 2026 – Jul 2026	limited series; published under the 20th Century Studios imprint	
Planet She-Hulk		#1–6	Jan 2026 – Jun 2026		
Planet Skaar Prologue		#1	Jul 2009	one-shot	
Planet-Size X-Men		#1	Aug 2021	one-shot	
Plasmer		#1–4	Nov 1993 – Feb 1994	limited series	
Point One		#1	Jan 2012	one-shot	
Police Academy		#1–6	Nov 1989 – Mar 1990		
Pooluminati		#1	May 2025	one-shot	
Power Man		#17–66	Feb 1974 – Dec 1980	continued from Hero for Hire; continued as Power Man and Iron Fist	
Power Man		Annual #1	1976		
Power Man		Giant-Size #1	1975		
Power Man	Timeless	#1–4	Apr 2025 – Aug 2025	limited series	
Power Man and Iron Fist	vol. 1	#67–125	Feb 1981 – Sep 1986	continued from Power Man	
Power Man and Iron Fist	vol. 2	#1–5	Apr 2011 – Jul 2011	limited series	
Power Man and Iron Fist	vol. 3	#1–15	Apr 2016 – May 2017		
Power Man and Iron Fist	vol. 3	Christmas Annual #1	2017	also known as Power Man and Iron Fist: Sweet Christmas	
Power Pachyderms		#1	Sep 1989	one-shot	
Power Pack	vol. 1	#1–62	Aug 1984 – Feb 1991		
Power Pack	vol. 1	#63	Jan 2018	one-shot; part of Marvel Legacy event	
Power Pack	vol. 2	#1–4	Aug 2000 – Nov 2000	limited series	
Power Pack	vol. 3	#1–4	Jun 2005 – Aug 2005	limited series	
Power Pack	vol. 4	#1–5	Jan 2021 – Jun 2021	limited series	
Power Pack	Day One	#1–4	May 2008 – Aug 2008	limited series	
Power Pack	Grow Up!	#1	Oct 2019	one-shot	
Power Pack	Holiday Special	#1	Feb 1992	one-shot	
Power Pack	Into the Storm	#1–5	Mar 2024 – Jul 2024	limited series	
Powerless		#1–6	Aug 2004 – Jan 2005	limited series	
Powers of X		#1–6	Sep 2019 – Dec 2019	limited series	
Predator	vol. 1	#1–6	Oct 2022 – Mar 2023	limited series	
Predator	vol. 2	#1–5	May 2023 – Sep 2023	limited series; published under the 20th Century Studios imprint	
Predator	Badlands	#1	Jan 2026	one-shot; movie tie-in; published under the 20th Century Studios imprint	
Predator	Black, White & Blood	#1–4	Sep 2025 – Dec 2025	limited series; published under the 20th Century Studios imprint	
Predator	Bloodshed	#1–5	Apr 2026 – Aug 2026	limited series; published under the 20th Century Studios imprint	
Predator	The Last Hunt	#1–4	Apr 2024 – Jul 2024	limited series; published under the 20th Century Studios imprint	
Predator Kills the Marvel Universe		#1–5	Oct 2025 – Feb 2026	limited series; published under the 20th Century Studios imprint	
Predator vs.	Black Panther	#1–4	Oct 2024 – Jan 2025	limited series; published under the 20th Century Studios imprint	
Predator vs.	The Planet of the Apes	#1–5	Sep 2026 – present	limited series; published under the 20th Century Studios imprint	
Predator vs.	Punisher	#1–4	Jan 2027 – present	limited series; published under the 20th Century Studios imprint	
Predator vs.	Spider-Man	#1–4	Jun 2025 – Sep 2025	limited series; published under the 20th Century Studios imprint	
Predator vs.	Wolverine	#1–4	Nov 2023 – Feb 2024	limited series; published under the 20th Century Studios imprint	
Prelude to Deadpool Corps		#1–5	May 2010	limited series	
Pride & Prejudice		#1–5	Jun 2009 – Oct 2009	limited series	
Prince Namor, the Sub-Mariner		#1–4	Sep 1984 – Dec 1984	limited series	
Prince Valiant		#1–4	Dec 1994 – Mar 1995	limited series	
Princess Leia		#1–5	May 2015 – Sep 2015	limited series; also known as Star Wars: Princess Leia	
The Prodigal Sun	Fantastic Four	#1	Sep 2019	one-shot; also known as Fantastic Four: The Prodigal Sun; part 1 of 3	
The Prodigal Sun	Guardians of the Galaxy	#1	Nov 2019	one-shot; also known as Guardians Of The Galaxy: The Prodigal Sun; part 3 of 3	
The Prodigal Sun	Silver Surfer	#1	Oct 2019	one-shot; also known as Silver Surfer: The Prodigal Sun; part 2 of 3	
Professor Xavier and the X-Men		#1–18	Nov 1995 – Apr 1997		
Prophet/Cable		#1–2	Jan 1997 – Mar 1997	limited series; co-published with Maximum Press	
Prowler	vol. 1	#1–4	Nov 1994 – Feb 1995	limited series; titled The Prowler	
Prowler	vol. 2	#1–6	Dec 2016 – May 2017		
The Prox Transmissions			Sep 2017	graphic novel	
Pryde and Wisdom		#1–3	Sep 1996 – Nov 1996	limited series	
Psi-Force		#1–32	Nov 1986 – Jun 1989		
Psi-Force		Annual #1	1987		
Psylocke	vol. 1	#1–4	Jan 2010 – Apr 2010	limited series	
Psylocke	vol. 2	#1–10	Jan 2025 – Oct 2025		
Psylocke	Ninja	#1–5	Mar 2026 – Jul 2026	limited series	
Psylocke & Archangel Crimson Dawn		#1–4	Aug 1997 – Nov 1997	limited series	
Ptolus – City by the Spire		#1–6	Oct 2006 – Mar 2007	limited series	
The Pulse		#1–14	Apr 2004 – May 2006		
The Punisher (Note: Some titles in this grouping do not include The in the title.)	vol. 1	#1–5	Jan 1986 – May 1986	limited series	
The Punisher	vol. 2	#1–104	Jul 1987 – Jul 1995		
The Punisher	vol. 2	Annual #1–7	1988 – 1994		
The Punisher	vol. 2	Back to School Special #1–3	Nov 1992 – Oct 1994		
The Punisher	vol. 2	Holiday Special #1–3	Jan 1993 – Jan 1995		
The Punisher	vol. 2	Summer Special #1–4	Aug 1991 – Jul 1994		
The Punisher	vol. 3	#1–18	Nov 1995 – Apr 1997	titled Punisher	
The Punisher	vol. 4	#1–4	Nov 1998 – Feb 1999	limited series	
The Punisher	vol. 5	#1–12	Apr 2000 – Mar 2001	limited series	
The Punisher	vol. 6	#1–37	Aug 2001 – Feb 2004		
The Punisher	vol. 7	#1–65	Mar 2004 – Feb 2009	continued as Punisher: Frank Castle Max	
The Punisher	vol. 7	Annual #1	Nov 2007		
The Punisher	vol. 7	X-Mas Special 2006 #1	Jan 2007		
The Punisher	vol. 8	#1–16	Mar 2009 – Jun 2010	Dark Reign tie-in initially; continued as on-going series; becomes Franken-Castle	
The Punisher	vol. 8	Annual 2009	Nov 2009		
The Punisher	vol. 9	#1–16	Oct 2011 – Nov 2012		
The Punisher	vol. 10	#1–20	Apr 2014 – Jul 2015		
The Punisher	vol. 11	#1–17	Jul 2016 – Dec 2017		
The Punisher	vol. 11	Annual #1	Dec 2016		
The Punisher	vol. 12	#218–228	Jan 2018 – Sep 2018	numbering continued from vol. 1	
The Punisher	vol. 13	#1–16	Oct 2018 – Dec 2019		
The Punisher	vol. 13	Annual #1	Sep 2019		
The Punisher	vol. 14	#1–12	May 2022 – Jul 2023	limited series	
The Punisher	vol. 15	#1–4	Jan 2024 – Apr 2024	limited series	
The Punisher	vol. 16	#1–5	Nov 2025 – Mar 2026	limited series; also known as Punisher: Red Band	
The Punisher	vol. 17	#1–	Apr 2026 – present		
The Punisher	A Man Named Frank		Jun 1994	one-shot	
The Punisher	Anniversary Magazine	#1	Feb 1994	one-shot	
The Punisher	Armory	#1–10	Jul 1990 – Nov 1994		
The Punisher	Bloodlines		1991	one-shot	
The Punisher	Bloody Valentine	#1	Apr 2006	one-shot	
The Punisher	Die Hard in the Big Easy		1992	one-shot	
The Punisher	Empty Quarter		Nov 1994	one-shot	
The Punisher	Force of Nature	#1	Apr 2008	one-shot	
The Punisher	Frank Castle Max	#66–75	Mar 2009 – Dec 2009	continued from The Punisher vol. 7	
The Punisher	Franken-Castle – The Birth of the Monster		Jul 2010	one-shot	
The Punisher	G-Force		1992	one-shot	
The Punisher	In the Blood	#1–5	Jan 2011 – May 2011	limited series	
The Punisher	Kill Krew	#1–5	Oct 2019 – Jan 2020	limited series	
The Punisher	Movie Special	#1	Jun 1990	one-shot; adaptation of the 1989 movie	
The Punisher	Nightmare	#1–5	Mar 2013	limited series	
The Punisher	No Escape		1990	one-shot	
The Punisher	Noir	#1–4	Oct 2009 – Nov 2009	limited series	
The Punisher	Official Movie Adaptation	#1–3	May 2004	limited series; adaptation of the 2004 film	
The Punisher	Origin of Microchip	#1–2	Jul 1993 – Aug 1993	limited series	
The Punisher	P.O.V.	#1–4	Jul 1991 – Dec 1991	limited series	
The Punisher	Red X-Mas	#1	Feb 2005	one-shot	
The Punisher	Return to Big Nothing		Jan 1989	graphic novel; published under the Epic Comics imprint	
The Punisher	Silent Night	#1	Feb 2006	one-shot	
The Punisher	Soviet	#1–6	Jan 2020 – May 2020	limited series	
The Punisher	The Cell	#1	Jul 2005	one-shot	
The Punisher	The End	#1	Jun 2004	one-shot	
The Punisher	The Ghosts of Innocents	#1–2	Jan 1993 – Mar 1993	limited series	
The Punisher	The Prize		1990	one-shot	
The Punisher	The Trial of the Punisher	#1–2	Nov 2013 – Dec 2013	limited series	
The Punisher	The Tyger	#1	Feb 2006	one-shot	
The Punisher	Year One	#1–4	Dec 1994 – Mar 1995	limited series	
The Punisher/	Batman: Deadly Knights		Oct 1994	one-shot; co-published with DC	
The Punisher/	Painkiller Jane	#1	Jan 2001	one-shot	
Punisher 2099	vol. 1	#1–34	Feb 1993 – Nov 1995		
Punisher 2099	vol. 2	#1	Nov 2004	one-shot	
Punisher 2099	vol. 3	#1	Jan 2020	one-shot	
The Punisher Invades the 'Nam: Final Invasion			Feb 1994	one-shot; collection of reprints and previously unpublished issues of The 'Nam	
The Punisher Kills the Marvel Universe		#1	Nov 1995	one-shot	
Punisher Max		#1–22	Jan 2010 – Apr 2012		
Punisher Max	Butterfly	#1	May 2010	one-shot	
Punisher Max	Force of Nature	#1	Apr 2008	one-shot	
Punisher Max	Get Castle	#1	Jan 2010	one-shot	
Punisher Max	Happy Ending	#1	Oct 2010	one-shot	
Punisher Max	Hot Rods of Death	#1	Nov 2010	one-shot	
Punisher Max	Little Black Book		Aug 2008	one-shot	
Punisher Max	Naked Kill		Aug 2009	one-shot	
Punisher Max	The Platoon	#1–6	Dec 2017 – Apr 2018	limited series	
Punisher Max	Tiny Ugly World	#1	Dec 2010	one-shot	
Punisher Max	X-Mas Special	#1	Feb 2009	one-shot	
The Punisher Meets Archie		#1	Aug 1994	one-shot; co-published with Archie Comics	
Punisher, Moon Knight & Daredevil: The Big Shots			Oct 2011	one-shot; also known as Big Shots: Spotlight	
The Punisher Presents: Barracuda Max		#1–5	Apr 2007 – Aug 2007	limited series	
Punisher Showdowns	Black Widow	#1	Dec 2026	one-shot	
Punisher Showdowns	Wolverine	#1	Jan 2027	one-shot	
The Punisher vs.	Bullseye	#1–5	Jan 2006 – May 2006	limited series	
The Punisher vs.	Daredevil	#1	Jun 2000	one-shot	
The Punisher vs.	Spider-Man	#1–5	Sep 2026 – Jan 2027	limited series	
The Punisher War Journal	vol. 1	#1–80	Nov 1988 – Jul 1995		
The Punisher War Journal	vol. 2	#1–26	Jan 2007 – Feb 2009	Civil War tie-in initially; continued as on-going series	
The Punisher War Journal	vol. 2	Annual #1	Jan 2009		
The Punisher War Journal	Base	#1	Apr 2023	one-shot	
The Punisher War Journal	Blitz	#1	Aug 2022	one-shot	
The Punisher War Journal	Brother	#1	Dec 2022	one-shot	
The Punisher War Zone	vol. 1	#1–41	Mar 1992 – Jul 1995		
The Punisher War Zone	vol. 1	Annual #1–2	Jul 1993 – Aug 1994		
The Punisher War Zone	vol. 2	#1–6	Feb 2009 – Jul 2009	limited series	
The Punisher War Zone	vol. 3	#1–5	Dec 2012 – Apr 2013	limited series	

== Q ==
Title	Series	Issues	Dates	Notes	Reference
Quake: S.H.I.E.L.D. 50th Anniversary		#1	Nov 2015	one-shot	
Quasar		#1–60	Oct 1989 – Jul 1994		
Queen in Black		#1–5	Sep 2026 – Nov 2026	limited series	
Queen in Black	Defenders of Light and Dark	#1–3	Sep 2026 – Nov 2026	limited series	
Queen in Black	Hela	#1	Sep 2026	one-shot	
Queen in Black	Thor	#1	Oct 2026	one-shot	
Queen in Black	Venom Unchained	#1–3	Sep 2026 – Nov 2026	limited series	
Questprobe		#1–3	Aug 1984 – Nov 1985	limited series	
Quicksilver		#1–13	Nov 1997 – Nov 1998		
Quicksilver	No Surrender	#1–5	Jul 2018 – Nov 2018	limited series	

== R ==
Title	Series	Issues	Dates	Notes	Reference
Radioactive Spider-Man		#1–3	Dec 2025 – Feb 2026	limited series; Age of Revelation tie-in	
Raiders of the Lost Ark		#1–3	Sep 1981 – Nov 1981	limited series; movie adaptation	
The Rampaging Hulk	vol. 1	#1–9	Jan 1977 – Jun 1978	continued as Hulk vol. 1	
The Rampaging Hulk	vol. 2	#1–6	Aug 1998 – Jan 1999		
Rampaging Wolverine		#1	Jun 2009	one-shot	
Ravage 2099		#1–33	Dec 1992 – Aug 1995		
Ravencroft		#1–5	Mar 2020 – Nov 2020	limited series	
Rawhide Kid	vol. 2	#17–151	Aug 1960 – May 1979	previous volume published by Atlas Comics numbering continued from previous volume	
Rawhide Kid	vol. 2	Special #1	Sep 1971		
Rawhide Kid	vol. 3	#1–4	Aug 1985 – Nov 1985	limited series	
Rawhide Kid	vol. 4	#1–5	Apr 2003 – Jun 2003	limited series	
Rawhide Kid	vol. 5	#1–4	Aug 2010 – Nov 2010	limited series	
Razorline: The First Cut		#1	Sep 1993	one-shot	
Realm of Kings		#1	Jan 2010	one-shot	
Realm of Kings	Imperial Guard	#1–5	Jan 2010 – May 2010	limited series	
Realm of Kings	Inhumans	#1–5	Jan 2010 – May 2010	limited series	
Realm of Kings	Son of Hulk	#1–4	Apr 2010 – Jul 2010	limited series	
Realm of X		#1–4	Oct 2023 – Jan 2024	limited series; Fall of X tie-in	
Reckoning War: Trial of the Watcher		#1	May 2022	one-shot	
Red Goblin		#1–10	Apr 2023 – Jan 2024		
Red Goblin	Red Death	#1	Dec 2019	one-shot	
Red Hulk		#1–10	Apr 2025 – Jan 2026	One World Under Doom tie-in	
Red Prophet: The Tales of Alvin Maker		#3–12	Nov 2006 – Jan 2008	limited series; first two issues published by Dabel Brothers Productions	
Red She-Hulk		#58–67	Dec 2012 – Sep 2013	continued from Hulk vol. 3	
Red Skull	vol. 1	#1–5	Sep 2011 – Jan 2012	limited series	
Red Skull	vol. 2	#1–3	Sep 2015 – Nov 2015	limited series; Secret Wars (2015) tie-in	
Red Sonja	vol. 1	#1–15	Jan 1977 – May 1979		
Red Sonja	vol. 2	#1–2	Feb 1983 – Mar 1983	limited series	
Red Sonja	vol. 3	#1–13	Aug 1983 – May 1986		
Red Sonja	Scavenger Hunt	#1	Dec 1995	one-shot	
Red Sonja	The Movie	#1–2	Nov 1985 – Dec 1985	limited series; adaptation of the 1985 movie	
Red Wolf	vol. 1	#1–9	May 1972 – Sep 1973		
Red Wolf	vol. 2	#1–6	Feb 2016 – Jul 2016	limited series	
The Ren & Stimpy Show		#1–44	Dec 1992 – Jul 1996		
The Ren & Stimpy Show	Around the World in a Daze		Jan 1996	one-shot	
The Ren & Stimpy Show	Eenteracteeve Special		Jul 1995	one-shot	
The Ren & Stimpy Show	Holiday Special		Feb 1995	one-shot	
The Ren & Stimpy Show	Radio Daze	#1	Nov 1995	one-shot	
The Ren & Stimpy Show	Special	#2–3	Jul 1994 – Oct 1994	limited series	
The Ren & Stimpy Show	Special: Four Swerks		Jan 1995	one-shot	
The Ren & Stimpy Show	Special: Powdered Toast Man	#1	Apr 1994	one-shot	
The Ren & Stimpy Show	Special: Powdered Toastman's Cereal Serial		Apr 1995	one-shot	
The Ren & Stimpy Show	Special: Sports		Oct 1995	one-shot	
Reptil		#1–4	Jul 2021 – Nov 2021	limited series	
Requiem for Dracula		#1	Feb 1993	one-shot	
Rescue		#1	Jul 2010	one-shot	
Resurrection of Magneto		#1–4	Mar 2024 – Jun 2024	limited series; Fall of the House of X tie-in	
Return of the Living Deadpool		#1–4	Apr 2015 – Jul 2015	limited series	
Return of Wolverine		#1–5	Nov 2018 – Apr 2019	limited series	
Return to Planet Hulk		#1	Dec 2025	one-shot	
Revenge of the Cosmic Ghost Rider		#1–5	Feb 2020 – Oct 2020	limited series	
Revenge: The Secret Origin of Emily Thorne			2014	graphic novel; TV tie-in	
Revolutionary War	Alpha	#1	Mar 2014	one-shot	
Revolutionary War	Dark Angel	#1	Mar 2014	one-shot	
Revolutionary War	Death's Head II	#1	Apr 2014	one-shot	
Revolutionary War	Knights of Pendragon	#1	Mar 2014	one-shot	
Revolutionary War	Motormouth	#1	May 2014	one-shot	
Revolutionary War	Omega	#1	May 2014	one-shot	
Revolutionary War	Super Soldiers	#1	Apr 2014	one-shot	
Revolutionary War	Warheads	#1	May 2014	one-shot	
Richie Rich		#1	Feb 1995	one-shot; movie adaptation	
Riftwar		#1–5	Jul 2009 – Dec 2009	limited series	
The Ringo Kid		#1–30	Jan 1970 – Nov 1976		
The Rise of Apocalypse		#1–4	Oct 1996 – Jan 1997	limited series	
Rise of the Black Panther		#1–6	Mar 2018 – Aug 2018	limited series	
Rise of the Powers of X		#1–5	Mar 2024 – Jul 2024	limited series	
The Rise Of Ultraman		#1–5	Nov 2020 – Mar 2021	limited series	
Road To Empyre: The Kree/Skrull War		#1	May 2020	one-shot	
Road to Oz		#1–6	Nov 2012 – May 2013	limited series	
RoboCop	vol. 1	#1	Oct 1987	one-shot; adaptation of the 1987 movie	
RoboCop	vol. 2	#1–23	Mar 1990 – Jan 1992		
RoboCop 2		#1–3	Aug 1990 – Sep 1990	limited series; adaptation of 1990 movie	
Robotix		#1	Feb 1986	one-shot; based on the animated TV series	
Rocket		#1–6	Jul 2017 – Dec 2017		
Rocket Raccoon	vol. 1	#1–4	May 1985 – Aug 1985	limited series	
Rocket Raccoon	vol. 2	#1–11	Sep 2014 – Jul 2015		
Rocket Raccoon	vol. 3	#1–5	Feb 2017 – Jun 2017		
Rocket Raccoon	Rocket Rewind	#1	Sep 2026	one-shot	
Rocket Raccoon and Groot		#1–10	Mar 2016 – Nov 2016		
Rocko's Modern Life		#1–7	Jun 1994 – Dec 1994		
Rogue	vol. 1	#1–4	Jan 1995 – Apr 1995	limited series	
Rogue	vol. 2	#1–4	Sep 2001 – Dec 2001	limited series	
Rogue	vol. 3	#1–12	Sep 2004 – Aug 2005		
Rogue	vol. 4	#1–5	Mar 2026 – Jul 2026	limited series	
Rogue	Battlebook: Streets of Fire	#1	Dec 1998	one-shot	
Rogue	The Savage Land	#1–5	Mar 2025 – Jul 2025	limited series	
Rogue & Gambit	vol. 1	#1–5	Mar 2018 – Jul 2018	limited series	
Rogue & Gambit	vol. 2	#1–5	May 2023 – Sep 2023	limited series	
Rogue Storm		#1–3	Dec 2025 – Feb 2026	limited series; Age of Revelation tie-in	
ROM		#1–75	Dec 1979 – Feb 1986		
ROM		Annual #1–4	1982 – 1985		
Roxxon Presents: Thor		#1	Jun 2024	one-shot	
Royals		#1–12	Jun 2017 – Dec 2017		
Ruins		#1–2	Aug 1995 – Sep 1995	limited series	
Ruins of Ravencroft	Carnage	#1	Mar 2020	one-shot	
Ruins of Ravencroft	Dracula	#1	Mar 2020	one-shot	
Ruins of Ravencroft	Sabretooth	#1	Mar 2020	one-shot	
Runaways	vol. 1	#1–18	Jul 2003 – Nov 2004		
Runaways	vol. 2	#1–30	Apr 2005 – Aug 2008		
Runaways	vol. 3	#1–14	Oct 2008 – Nov 2009		
Runaways	vol. 4	#1–4	Aug 2015 – Nov 2015	limited series; Secret Wars (2015) tie-in	
Runaways	vol. 5	#1–38	Nov 2017 – Oct 2021		
Runaways	vol. 6	#1–5	Aug 2025 – Dec 2025	limited series; One World Under Doom tie-in	
Runaways	Saga	#1	Mar 2007	one-shot	

== See also ==
- List of Timely and Atlas Comics publications
- List of first appearances in Marvel Comics publications
- List of X-Men comics

For the titles from other Marvel imprints, see the following articles:

- Epic Comics
- Icon Comics
- Marvel Music
- Marvel UK - List of Marvel UK publications
- Razorline
- Star Comics
