= List of Punisher titles =

The Punisher has appeared in numerous comic book series since his first appearance in The Amazing Spider-Man #129 (February 1974), including a number of eponymous titles starting in the mid-1980s.

== Primary series ==
Title	Series	Issues	Cover dates	Imprint	Notes	LGY
Punisher	vol. 1	#1–5	January 1986 – May 1986	Marvel Comics	Limited series.	#1-5
Punisher	vol. 2	#1–104 Annual #1–7	July 1987 – July 1995 1988 – 1994	Marvel Comics		#6-109
Punisher	vol. 3	#1–18	November 1995 – April 1997	Marvel Edge (#1–6); Marvel (#7–18)		#110-127
Punisher	vol. 4	#1–4	November 1998 – February 1999	Marvel Knights	Limited series. Also known as The Punisher: Purgatory.	#128-131
Punisher	vol. 5	#1–12	April 2000 – March 2001	Marvel Knights	Limited series. Also known as The Punisher: Welcome Back, Frank.	#132-143
Punisher	vol. 6	#1–37	August 2001 – February 2004	Marvel Knights		
Punisher	vol. 7	#1–75 Annual #1	March 2004 – October 2009 November 2007	MAX Comics	Retitled Punisher: Frank Castle MAX (in indicia) starting with issue #66. Series is often referred to as The Punisher MAX.	
Punisher	vol. 8	#1–21 Annual #1	March 2009 – November 2010 November 2009	Marvel Comics	Retitled Franken-Castle starting with issue #17.	#144-164
Punisher	vol. 9	#1–16	August 2011 – September 2012	Marvel Comics		#165-180
Punisher	vol. 10	#1–20	February 2014 – June 2015	Marvel Comics		#181-200
Punisher	vol. 11	#1–17 (#218–228) Annual #1	May 2016 – October 2017 November 2017 - July 2018 December 2016	Marvel Comics	Series resumed legacy numbering with #18 / 218.	#201-228
Punisher	vol. 12	#1–16 Annual #1	August 2018 – October 2019 September 2019	Marvel Comics		#229-244
Punisher	vol. 13	#1–12	March 2022 – April 2023	Marvel Comics		#245-256
Punisher	vol. 14	#1-4	November 2023 – April 2024	Marvel Comics		
The Punisher War Journal	vol. 1	#1–80	November 1988 – July 1995	Marvel Comics		
The Punisher War Journal	vol. 2	#1–26 Annual #1	January 2007 – January 2009 2009	Marvel Comics		
Punisher War Zone	vol. 1	#1–41 Annual #1–2	March 1992 – July 1995 1993 – 1994	Marvel Comics		
Punisher War Zone	vol. 2	#1–6	February 2009 – March 2009	Marvel Knights	Limited series.	
Punisher War Zone	vol. 3	#1–5	October 2012 – February 2013	Marvel Comics	Limited series.	
PunisherMAX		#1–22	January 2010 – February 2012	MAX Comics		

== Limited series ==
Title	Issues	Cover dates	Writer	Artist	Imprint	Notes
The Punisher Magazine	#1–16	September 1989 – November 1990			Marvel Comics	Series reprinting stories from Punisher (vol. 1 and 2), Punisher Annuals, Punisher War Journal and Daredevil in black-and-white.
The Punisher Armory	#1–10	July 1990 – November 1994	Eliot R. Brown		Marvel Comics	
Punisher: P.O.V.	#1–4	1991 – 1991	Jim Starlin	Bernie Wrightson	Marvel Comics	Originally conceived as a sequel to Batman: The Cult by the same creative team, but was reworked for the Punisher.
The Punisher Summer Special	#1–4	August 1991 – July 1994	Various	Various	Marvel Comics	Anthology series.
Blood and Glory	#1–3	October 1992 – December 1992	D. G. Chichester Margaret Clark	Klaus Janson	Marvel Comics	Captain America and Punisher team-up series.
Punisher Back to School Special	#1–3	November 1992 – October 1994	Various	Various	Marvel Comics	Anthology series.
The Punisher Holiday Special	#1–3	January 1993 – January 1995	Various	Various	Marvel Comics	Anthology series.
Punisher: The Ghosts of Innocents	#1–2	January 1993 – January 1993	Jim Starlin	Tom Grindberg	Marvel Comics	
The Punisher: The Origin of Microchip	#1–2	July 1993 – August 1993	Mike Baron Carl Potts	Louis Williams (p) Art Nichols (i) Josef Rubinstein (i)	Marvel Comics	Title in indicia is The Punisher: Origin Micro Chip.
Wolverine and The Punisher: Damaging Evidence	#1–3	October 1993 – December 1993	Carl Potts	Gary Erskine	Marvel Comics	
The Punisher: Year One	#1–4	December 1994 – March 1995	Dan Abnett Andy Lanning	Dale Eaglesham (p) Scott Koblish (i)	Marvel Comics	
Spider-Man / Punisher: Family Plot	#1–2	February 1996 – February 1996	Tom Lyle	Various	Marvel Comics (#1); Marvel Edge (#2)	
Wolverine / Punisher: Revelation	#1–4	June 1999 – September 1999	Tom Sniegoski Christopher Golden	Pat Lee (p) Alvin Lee (i)	Marvel Knights	
Born	#1–4	August 2003 – November 2003	Garth Ennis	Darick Robertson (p) Tom Palmer (i)	MAX Comics	
Wolverine / Punisher	#1–5	May 2004 – September 2004	Peter Milligan	Lee Weeks (p) Tom Palmer (i)	Marvel Knights	
Daredevil vs. Punisher	#1–6	September 2005 – January 2006	David Lapham		Marvel Knights	
Punisher vs. Bullseye	#1–5	January 2006 – May 2006	Daniel Way	Steve Dillon	Marvel Knights	
The Punisher Presents: Barracuda MAX	#1–5	April 2007 – August 2007	Garth Ennis	Goran Parlov	MAX Comics	Series starring Barracuda, set between the story arcs "Barracuda" and "Long Cold Dark" from Punisher (vol. 7).
Punisher: In the Blood	#1–5	January 2011 – May 2011	Rick Remender	Roland Boschi	Marvel Comics	Set in the aftermath of the Dark Reign storyline.
Untold Tales of Punisher MAX	#1–5	August 2012 – December 2012	Various	Various	MAX Comics	Anthology series.
Punisher: Nightmare	#1–5	March 2013 – March 2013	Scott M. Gimple	Mark Texeira (p) Frank D'Armata (i)	Marvel Comics	
Punisher: The Trial of the Punisher	#1–2	November 2013 – December 2013	Marc Guggenheim	Leinil Francis Yu (#1) Mico Suayan (#2)	Marvel Comics	
Daredevil / Punisher: Seventh Circle	#1–4	July 2016 – October 2016	Charles Soule	Szymon Kudranski	Marvel Comics	Print editions of the digital comics of the same name.
Doctor Strange / Punisher: Magic Bullets	#1–4	February 2017 – May 2017	John Barber	Andrea Broccardo Jason Muhr (p)	Marvel Comics	Print editions of the digital comics of the same name.
Deadpool vs. The Punisher	#1–4	June 2017 – August 2017	Fred Van Lente	Pere Pérez	Marvel Comics	
Punisher MAX: The Platoon	#1–6	December 2017 – April 2018	Garth Ennis	Goran Parlov	MAX Comics	
War of the Realms: Punisher	#1–3	June 2019 – August 2019	Gerry Duggan	Marcelo Ferreira (p) Roberto Poggi (i)	Marvel Comics	War of the Realms event tie-in series.
Punisher Kill Krew	#1–5	October 2019 – January 2020	Gerry Duggan	Juan Ferreyra	Marvel Comics	War of the Realms event tie-in series.
Punisher: Soviet	#1–6	January 2020 – May 2020	Garth Ennis	Jacen Burrows (p) Guillermo Ortego (i)	MAX Comics	

== One-shot and graphic novels ==
Title	Cover dates	Writer	Artist	Imprint	Notes
Graphic novels
Marvel preview #2	1975	Gerry Conway	Tony DeZuniga and cover by Gray Morrow	Marvel Comics	Origin of The Punisher, first appearance of Maria Castle, first appearance of Dominic Fortune
Marvel Super-Action #1	1976	Archie Goodwin	Tony DeZuniga	Curtis/Marvel	Depicts the second origin of the character.
Marvel Graphic Novel: The Punisher, Assassin's Guild	1988	Mary Jo Duffy	Jorge Zaffino	Marvel Comics	
Epic Graphic Novel: The Punisher -- Return to Big Nothing	1989	Steven Grant	Mike Zeck (p) John Beatty (i)	Epic Comics	
Marvel Graphic Novel: The Punisher: Intruder	1989	Mike Baron	Bill Reinhold	Marvel Comics	
The Punisher: Kingdom Gone	October 1990	Chuck Dixon	Jorge Zaffino	Marvel Comics	
Punisher: Blood on the Moors	December 1992	Alan Grant John Wagner	Cam Kennedy	Marvel Comics	
One-shots
The Punisher: No Escape	1990	Gregory Wright	Tod Smith (p) Danny Bulanadi (i)	Marvel Comics	
The Punisher: The Prize	1990	C. J. Henderson	Mike Harris	Marvel Comics	
Punisher Bloodlines	1991	Gerry Conway	Dave Cockrum (p) Jeff Albrecht (i)	Marvel Comics	
Punisher G-Force	1992	Mike Baron	Hugh Haynes (p) Jimmy Palmiotti (i)	Marvel Comics	
The Punisher: Die Hard in the Big Easy	1992	John Wagner	Phil Gascoine	Marvel Comics	
The Punisher Ashcan Edition	1994			Marvel Comics	Ashcan comic.
The Punisher: Empty Quarter	November 1994	Mike Baron	Bill Reinhold	Marvel Comics	
Double Edge: Alpha #1	August 1995	Larry Hama	Kerry Gammill (p) Tom Morgan (p) Tom Palmer (i)	Marvel Edge	
Double Edge: Omega	October 1995	John Ostrander Kim Yale	Doug Wheatley (p) Jimmy Palmiotti (i)	Marvel Edge	
Punisher: The End #1	June 2004	Garth Ennis	Richard Corben	MAX Comics	
Punisher: Red X-Mas #1	February 2005	Jimmy Palmiotti Justin Gray	Mark Texeira (p) Jimmy Palmiotti (i)	Marvel Knights	
Punisher: The Cell #1	July 2005	Garth Ennis	Lewis LaRosa (p) Scott Koblish (i)	MAX Comics	
Punisher: Silent Night #1	February 2006	Andy Diggle	Kyle Hotz	Marvel Knights	
Punisher: The Tyger #1	February 2006	Garth Ennis	John Severin	MAX Comics	
Punisher: Bloody Valentine #1	April 2006	Jimmy Palmiotti Justin Gray	Paul Gulacy (p) Jimmy Palmiotti (i)	Marvel Knights	
Punisher: X-Mas Special 2006 #1	January 2007	Stuart Moore	C. P. Smith	Marvel Comics	
The Punisher: Force of Nature #1	April 2008	Duane Swierczynski	Michel Lacombe	MAX Comics	
Punisher MAX Special: Little Black Book #1	August 2008	Victor Gischler	Jefte Palo	MAX Comics	
Punisher MAX X-Mas Special #1	February 2009	Jason Aaron	Roland Boschi	MAX Comics	
Punisher MAX: Naked Kill	August 2009	Jonathan Maberry	Laurence Campbell	MAX Comics	
Dark Reign: The List - The Punisher #1	December 2009	Rick Remender	John Romita Jr. (p) Klaus Janson (i)	Marvel Comics	Dark Reign tie-in.
Punisher MAX: Get Castle	January 2010	Rob Williams	Laurence Campbell	MAX Comics	
Punisher MAX: Butterfly #1	May 2010	Valerie D'Orazio	Laurence Campbell	MAX Comics	
Punisher: Franken-Castle - The Birth of the Monster #1	July 2010	Rick Remender	John Romita Jr. (p) Klaus Janson (i)	Marvel Comics	
Punisher MAX: Happy Ending #1	October 2010	Peter Milligan	Juan José Ryp	MAX Comics	
Punisher MAX: Hot Rods of Death #1	November 2010	Charlie Huston	Shawn Martinbrough	MAX Comics	
Punisher MAX: Tiny Ugly World #1	December 2010	David Lapham	Dalibor Talajić	MAX Comics	
Punisher War Journal: Blitz #1	June 2022	Torunn Gronbekk	Lan Medina	Marvel Comics	
Crossovers
Ghost Rider; Wolverine; Punisher: Hearts of Darkness	December 1991	Howard Mackie	John Romita Jr. (p) Klaus Janson (i)	Marvel Comics	
Punisher / Black Widow: Spinning Doomsday's Web	December 1992	D. G. Chichester	Larry Stroman (p) Mark Farmer (i)	Marvel Comics	
Spider-Man, Punisher, Sabretooth: Designer Genes	1993	Terry Kavanagh	Scott McDaniel (p) Keith Williams (i)	Marvel Comics	
Batman / Punisher: Lake of Fire	1994	Dennis O'Neil	Barry Kitson (p) James Pascoe (i)	Marvel Comics/DC Comics	Intercompany crossover.
The Punisher Meets Archie #1	August 1994	Batton Lash	John Buscema (p) Stan Goldberg (i) Tom Palmer (i)	Marvel Comics/Archie Comics	Intercompany crossover. One of two editions, second one titled Archie Meets the Punisher.
Punisher / Batman: Deadly Knights	October 1994	Chuck Dixon	John Romita Jr. (p) Klaus Janson (i)	Marvel Comics/DC Comics	Intercompany crossover.
Ghost Rider, Wolverine, Punisher: The Dark Design	December 1994	Howard Mackie	Ron Garney (p) Al Milgrom (i)	Marvel Comics	
Punisher vs. Daredevil #1	June 2000	Various	Various	Marvel Comics	Reprints Daredevil #183–184, 257.
Spider-Man vs Punisher #1	July 2000	Joseph Harris	Michael Lopez (p) Jason Minor (i)	Marvel Comics	
The Punisher / Painkiller Jane #1	January 2001	Garth Ennis	Joe Jusko (p) Dave Ross (p) Josef Rubinstein (i)	Marvel Knights	
Witchblade / The Punisher #1	June 2007	Ron Marz	Adriana Melo	Marvel Comics/Image Comics	Intercompany crossover.
Eminem/The Punisher #1	May 2009	Fred Van Lente	Salvador Larroca	Marvel Comics	Advertised on cover as two-issue limited series, but released as a one-shot.

== Other versions ==
Titles starring alternate versions of the Punisher.

Title	Issues	Cover dates	Writer	Artist	Imprint	Notes
Punisher: A Man Named Frank		June 1994	Chuck Dixon	John Buscema	Marvel Comics	Prestige format one-shot.
Punisher Kills the Marvel Universe	#1	November 1995	Garth Ennis	Doug Braithwaite (p) Various (i)	Marvel Alterniverse	Reprinted in 2008 with variant covers.
Bullets and Bracelets	#1	April 1996	John Ostrander	Gary Frank (p) Cam Smith (i)	Amalgam Comics	
Marvel Mangaverse: Punisher	#1	March 2002	Peter David	Lea Hernandez	Marvel Mangaverse	
Punisher Noir	#1–4	October 2009 – November 2009	Frank Tieri	Paul Azaceta (#1–3) Antonio Fuso (#4)	Marvel Comics	Limited series.
Marvel Universe vs. the Punisher	#1–4	October 2010 – November 2010	Jonathan Maberry	Goran Parlov	Marvel Comics	Limited series.
Space: Punisher	#1–4	September 2012 – December 2012	Frank Tieri	Mark Texeira	Marvel Comics	Limited series.
What If? The Punisher	#1	December 2018	Carl Potts	Juanan Ramírez	Marvel Comics	What If...? one-shot exploring what would happen if Peter Parker became the Punisher.
Movie versions
The Punisher Movie Special	#1	June 1990	Carl Potts	Brent Anderson	Marvel Comics	Original screenplay by Boaz Yakin and Robert Kamen. Adaptation of the 1989 film The Punisher.
Punisher: Countdown		2004	Garth Ennis	Steve Dillon (p) Jimmy Palmiotti (i)	Marvel Comics	Prequel comic to the 2004 film packaged with the DVD release.
The Punisher: Official Movie Adaptation	#1–3	May 2004 – May 2004	Peter Milligan	Pat Olliffe (p) Scott Koblish (i)	Marvel Comics	Adaptation of the 2004 film The Punisher.
Punisher 2099
Punisher 2099	#1–34	February 1993 – November 1995	Various	Various	Marvel Comics	Cover title changed to Punisher 2099 A.D. starting with issue #28.
Punisher 2099	#1	November 2004	Robert Kirkman	Pop Mhan	Marvel Knights	Part of the Marvel Knights 2099 one-shots released in 2004.
The Punisher 2099	#1	January 2020	Lonnie Nadler Zac Thompson	Eoin Marron Matt Horak	Marvel Comics	One-shot.
Cosmic Ghost Rider
Cosmic Ghost Rider	#1–5	September 2018 – January 2019	Donny Cates	Dylan Burnett	Marvel Comics	Limited series starring an alternate universe Frank Castle as the Rider.
Cosmic Ghost Rider Destroys Marvel History	#1–6	March 2019 – October 2019	Paul Scheer Nick Giovannetti	Various	Marvel Comics	Limited series.
Revenge of the Cosmic Ghost Rider	#1–5	February 2020 – August 2020	Various	Various	Marvel Comics	Limited series.

== Collected editions ==
The various series have been collected into individual volumes:

=== Primary and ongoing series ===
Title	Vol.	Material collected	Publication date	Format	ISBN
Punisher (vol. 1 - vol. 2)
The Punisher: Circle of Blood		Punisher (vol. 1) #1–5	1988 April 2008 September 2011	TPB HC TPB	978-0871353948 978-0785123316 978-0785157854
Punisher: Back to the War Omnibus		Amazing Spider-Man #129, 134–135, 161–162, 174–175, 201–202, Annual #15; Giant-Size Spider-Man #4; A story from Marvel Preview #2; A story from Marvel Super Action #1; Captain America #241; Daredevil #182–184; Spectacular Spider-Man #81–83; Punisher (vol. 1) #1–5	September 2017	HC	978-1302908232 978-1302908249 (variant cover)
Essential Punisher (black-and-white)	1	Amazing Spider-Man #129, 134–135, 161–162, 174–175, 201–202, Annual #15; Giant-Size Spider-Man #4; Marvel Preview Presents #2; Marvel Super Action #1; Captain America #241; Daredevil #182–184; Spectacular Spider-Man #81–83; Punisher (vol. 1) #1–5	August 2006	TPB	978-0785123750
Essential Punisher (black-and-white)	2	Punisher (vol. 2) #1–20, Annual #1; Daredevil #257	September 2007	TPB	978-0785127345
Essential Punisher (black-and-white)	3	Punisher (vol. 2) #21–40, Annual #2–3	January 2009	TPB	978-0785130734
Essential Punisher (black-and-white)	4	Punisher (vol. 2) #41–59, Annual #4–5	September 2012	TPB	978-0785163510
Punisher Epic Collection	Circle of Blood	Punisher (vol. 1) #1–5; Punisher (vol. 2) #1–10; Daredevil #257; Marvel Graphic Novel: The Punisher, Assassin's Guild	December 2018	TPB	978-1302914073
Punisher Epic Collection	Kingpin Rules	Punisher (vol. 2) #11–25, Annual #1–2	February 2019	TPB	978-1302916411
Punisher Epic Collection	Return to Big Nothing	Punisher (vol. 2) #26–34, Annual #3 Punisher Classic #1, Epic Graphic Novel: The Punisher - Return to Big Nothing, Marvel Graphic Novel: The Punisher - Intruder, Marvel Graphic Novel: The Punisher - Kingdom Gone	July 2021	TPB	978-1302930851
Punisher Epic Collection	Jigsaw Puzzle	Punisher (vol. 2) #35–48, Annual #4; The Punisher: No Escape; The Punisher: The Prize	February 2020	TPB	978-1302922757
Punisher Epic Collection	Capital Punishment	Punisher (vol. 2) #63–75; Punisher G-Force; The Punisher: Die Hard in the Big Easy; Punisher / Black Widow: Spinning Doomsday's Web	December 2017	TPB	978-1302907846
Punisher (vol. 4 - vol. 6)
Marvel Knights Punisher by Golden, Sniegoski & Wrightson: Purgatory		Punisher (vol. 4) #1–4; Wolverine / Punisher: Revelation #1–4	January 2019	TPB	978-1302916084
The Punisher: Welcome Back, Frank		Punisher (vol. 5) #1–12	June 2001 August 2008	TPB HC	978-0785107835 978-0785133841 978-0785133858 (2008 HC variant)
The Punisher: Welcome Back, Frank		Punisher (vol. 5) #1–12	March 2011 March 2021	TPB HC	978-0785157168 (new printing) 978-1302928575 (Marvel Select)
The Punisher	Army of One	Punisher (vol. 6) #1–7	February 2002	TPB	978-0785108399
The Punisher	3: Business as Usual	Punisher (vol. 6) #13–18	February 2003	TPB	978-0785110149
The Punisher	4: Full Auto	Punisher (vol. 6) #20–26	February 2003	TPB	978-0785111498
The Punisher	5: Streets of Laredo	Punisher (vol. 6) #19, 27–32	February 2003	TPB	978-0785110965
The Punisher	6: Confederacy of Dunces	Punisher (vol. 6) #33–37	February 2004	TPB	978-0785113447
The Punisher	2	Punisher (vol. 6) #1–7, 13–18	February 2002	HC	978-0785111702
The Punisher	3	Punisher (vol. 6) #19–27	March 2004	HC	978-0785113171
Marvel Knights Punisher by Garth Ennis: The Complete Collection	1	Punisher (vol. 5) #1–12; Punisher (vol. 6) #1–5; Punisher Kills the Marvel Universe	December 2018	TPB	978-1302914080
Marvel Knights Punisher by Peyer & Gutierrez: Taxi Wars		Punisher (vol. 6) #8–12; Punisher: X-Mas Special 2006 #1; Spider-Man vs Punisher #1; B story from Marvel Knights Double Shot #4	February 2019	TPB	978-1302916336
Marvel Knights Punisher by Garth Ennis: The Complete Collection	2	Punisher (vol. 6) #6–7, 13–26; A story from Marvel Knights Double Shot #1	March 2019	TPB	978-1302916077
Marvel Knights Punisher by Garth Ennis: The Complete Collection	3	Punisher (vol. 6) #27–37; Punisher War Zone (vol. 2) #1–6	June 2019	TPB	978-1302918651
The Punisher by Garth Ennis Omnibus		Punisher (vol. 5) #1–12; Punisher (vol. 6) #1–7, 13–37; Punisher Kills the Marvel Universe; A story from Marvel Knights Double Shot #1	November 2008	HC	978-1302907884
Punisher (vol. 7)
The Punisher MAX	1: In the Beginning	Punisher (vol. 7) #1–6	September 2004	TPB	978-0785113911
The Punisher MAX	2: Kitchen Irish	Punisher (vol. 7) #7–12	November 2004	TPB	978-0785115397
The Punisher MAX	3: Mother Russia	Punisher (vol. 7) #13–18	May 2005	TPB	978-0785116035
The Punisher MAX	4: Up is Down and White is Black	Punisher (vol. 7) #19–24	November 2005	TPB	978-0785117315
The Punisher MAX	5: The Slavers	Punisher (vol.7) #25–30	May 2006	TPB	978-0785118992
The Punisher MAX	6: Barracuda	Punisher (vol. 7) #31–36	November 2006	TPB	978-0785120230
The Punisher MAX	7: Man of Stone	Punisher (vol. 7) #37–42	April 2007	TPB	978-0785121657
The Punisher MAX	8: Widowmaker	Punisher (vol. 7) #43–49	September 2007	TPB	978-0785124542
The Punisher MAX	9: Long Cold Dark	Punisher (vol. 7) #50–54	March 2008	TPB	978-0785128144
The Punisher MAX	10: Valley Forge, Valley Forge	Punisher (vol. 7) #55–60	October 2008	TPB	978-0785127550
The Punisher MAX	11: Girls in White Dresses	Punisher (vol. 7) #61–65	February 2009	TPB	978-0785125204
Punisher: Frank Castle MAX	Six Hours to Kill	Punisher: Frank Castle MAX #66–70; The Punisher: Force of Nature #1	August 2009	TPB	978-0785131823
Punisher: Frank Castle MAX	Welcome to the Bayou	Punisher: Frank Castle MAX #71–74; Punisher MAX Special: Little Black Book #1	December 2009	TPB	978-0785133780
The Punisher MAX	1	Punisher (vol. 7) #1–12	September 2005	HC	978-0785118404
The Punisher MAX	2	Punisher (vol.7) #13–24	February 2006	HC	978-0785120223
The Punisher MAX	3	Punisher (vol. 7) #25–36	May 2007	HC	978-0785119814
The Punisher MAX	4	Punisher (vol. 7) #37–49	February 2008	HC	978-0785128670
The Punisher MAX	5	Punisher (vol. 7) #50–60	June 2009	HC	978-0785137825
The Punisher MAX	6	Punisher (vol. 7) #61–65; Punisher: Frank Castle MAX #66–74; The Punisher: Force of Nature #1; Punisher MAX Special: Little Black Book #1	June 2011	HC	978-0785156567
The Punisher MAX: The Complete Collection	1	Born #1–4; Punisher (vol. 7) #1–12	February 2016	TPB	978-1302900151
The Punisher MAX: The Complete Collection	2	Punisher (vol. 7) #13–30	May 2016	TPB	978-1302900168
The Punisher MAX: The Complete Collection	3	Punisher (vol. 7) #31–49	October 2016	TPB	978-1302901875
The Punisher MAX: The Complete Collection	4	Punisher (vol. 7) #50–60; The Punisher Presents: Barracuda MAX #1–5; Punisher: The Tyger #1; Punisher: The Cell #1; Punisher: The End #1	December 2016	TPB	978-1302902445
The Punisher MAX: The Complete Collection	5	Punisher (vol. 7) #61–65; Punisher: Frank Castle MAX #66–75, Annual #1; The Punisher: Force of Nature #1; Punisher MAX Special: Little Black Book #1	January 2017	TPB	978-1302902742
The Punisher MAX: The Complete Collection	6	Untold Tales of Punisher MAX #1–5; Punisher MAX X-Mas Special #1; Punisher MAX: Naked Kill; Punisher MAX: Get Castle; Punisher MAX: Butterfly #1; Punisher MAX: Happy Ending #1; Punisher MAX: Hot Rods of Death #1; Punisher MAX: Tiny Ugly World #1	August 2017	TPB	978-1302907396
The Punisher MAX by Garth Ennis Omnibus	1	Born #1–4; Punisher (vol. 7) #1–30	May 2018	HC	978-1302912079
The Punisher MAX by Garth Ennis Omnibus	2	Punisher (vol. 7) #31–60; The Punisher Presents: Barracuda MAX #1–5; Punisher: The Tyger #1; Punisher: The Cell #1; Punisher: The End #1	August 2018	HC	978-1302912062
Punisher (vol. 8 - vol. 14)
Punisher	Dark Reign	Punisher (vol. 8) #1–5	August 2009 November 2009	HC TPB	978-0785139973 978-0785140696
Punisher	Dead End	Punisher (vol. 8) #6–10, Annual #1	December 2009 April 2010	HC TPB	978-0785142782 978-0785141624
Punisher	Franken-Castle	Punisher (vol. 8) #11–16; Dark Reign: The List - The Punisher #1; Franken-Castle #17–21; Dark Wolverine #88–89	November 2010 April 2011	HC TPB	978-0785147541 978-0785144205
Punisher by Rick Remender Omnibus		Punisher (vol. 8) #1–16, Annual #1; Franken-Castle #17–21; Dark Wolverine #88–89; Dark Reign: The List - The Punisher #1; Punisher: In the Blood #1–5	July 2012	HC	978-1302916411
The Punisher by Greg Rucka	1	Punisher (vol. 9) #1–5; A story from Spider-Island: I Love New York City #1	February 2012 August 2012	HC TPB	978-0785163749 978-0785157359
The Punisher by Greg Rucka	2	Punisher (vol. 9) #6–10; Avenging Spider-Man #6; Daredevil (vol. 3) #11	September 2012	TPB	978-0785159209
The Punisher by Greg Rucka	3	Punisher (vol. 9) #11–16	February 2013	TPB	978-0785159216
The Punisher	1: Black and White	Punisher (vol. 10) #1–6	August 2014	TPB	978-0785154433
The Punisher	2: Border Crossing	Punisher (vol. 10) #7–12; Black Widow (vol. 5) #9	January 2015	TPB	978-0785154440
The Punisher	3: Last Days	Punisher (vol. 10) #13–20	September 2015	TPB	978-0785192541
The Punisher	1: On the Road	Punisher (vol. 11) #1–6	December 2016	TPB	978-1302900472
The Punisher	2: End of the Line	Punisher (vol. 11) #7–12	July 2017	TPB	978-1302900489
The Punisher	3: King of the New York Streets	Punisher (vol. 11) #13–17	January 2018	TPB	978-1302905415
The Punisher: War Machine	1	Punisher (vol. 11) #218–223	May 2018	TPB	978-1302910723
The Punisher: War Machine	2	Punisher (vol. 11) #224–228	November 2018	TPB	978-1302910730
The Punisher	1: World War Frank	Punisher (vol. 12) #1–5	February 2019	TPB	978-1302913472
The Punisher	2: War in Bagalia	Punisher (vol. 12) #6–11	May 2019	TPB	978-1302913489
The Punisher	3: Street by Street, Block by Block	Punisher (vol. 12) #12–16	November 2019	TPB	978-1302919023
The Punisher	1: The King Of Killers Book 1	Punisher (vol. 13) #1–6	December 2022	TPB	978-1302928773
The Punisher	2: The King Of Killers Book 2	Punisher (vol. 13) #7–12	August 2023	TPB	978-1302928780
The Punisher War Journal
The Punisher: An Eye for an Eye		Punisher War Journal (vol. 1) #1–3	1991	TPB	978-0871357779
The Punisher/Wolverine: African Saga		Punisher War Journal (vol. 1) #6–7	January 1990	TPB	978-0871356116
The Punisher War Journal Classic	1	Punisher War Journal (vol. 1) #1–8	August 2008	TPB	978-0785131182
The Punisher War Journal by Carl Potts and Jim Lee		Punisher War Journal (vol. 1) #1–19; C story from Punisher (vol. 2) Annual #2; H story from What The--?! #10	September 2016	TPB	978-1302901073
Punisher War Journal	1: Civil War	Punisher War Journal (vol. 2) #1–4, 1 (black-and-white)	April 2007 September 2007 July 2009	HC TPB TPB	978-0785127758 978-0785123156 978-0785141815 (new printing)
Punisher War Journal	2: Goin' Out West	Punisher War Journal (vol. 2) #5–11	December 2007 March 2008	HC TPB	978-0785128526 978-0785126362
Punisher War Journal	3: Hunter Hunted	Punisher War Journal (vol. 2) #12–17	April 2008 July 2008	HC TPB	978-0785130215 978-0785126645
Punisher War Journal	4: Jigsaw	Punisher War Journal (vol. 2) #18–23	December 2008 March 2009	HC TPB	978-0785130222 978-0785129646
Punisher War Journal	5: Secret Invasion	Punisher War Journal (vol. 2) #24–26, Annual #1	February 2009 May 2009	HC TPB	978-0785131489 978-0785131700
Punisher War Journal by Matt Fraction: The Complete Collection	1	Punisher War Journal (vol. 2) #1–12, 1 (black-and-white)	February 2019	TPB	978-1302916428
Punisher War Zone
The Punisher: Barbarian With a Gun		Punisher War Zone (vol. 1) #26–30	November 2008	TPB	978-0785134282
The Punisher: River of Blood		Punisher War Zone (vol. 1) #31–36	December 2005	TPB	978-0785115427
Punisher: War Zone		Punisher War Zone (vol. 2) #1–6	April 2009 August 2009	HC TPB	978-0785138228 978-0785132608
The Punisher: War Zone		Punisher War Zone (vol. 3) #1–5	May 2013	TPB	978-0785167426
PunisherMAX
PunisherMAX	Kingpin	PunisherMAX #1–5	June 2010 November 2010	HC TPB	978-0785145967 978-0785140719
PunisherMAX	Bullseye	PunisherMAX #6–11	May 2011 November 2011	HC TPB	978-0785147558 978-0785147565
PunisherMAX	Frank	PunisherMAX #12–16	October 2011 April 2012	HC TPB	978-0785152088 978-0785152095
PunisherMAX	Homeless	PunisherMAX #17–22	April 2012 October 2012	HC TPB	978-0785152101 978-0785152118
The Punisher MAX: The Complete Collection		PunisherMAX #1–22	January 2018	TPB	978-1302909123
PunisherMAX by Jason Aaron Omnibus		PunisherMAX #1–22; Punisher MAX X-Mas Special #1	June 2014	HC	978-0785154297
Story arcs
The Punisher: Shadowmasters		Shadowmasters #1–4; Punisher War Journal (vol. 1) #1–3, 8–9; Punisher (vol. 2) #24–25	July 2018	TPB	978-1302912024
The Punisher: Suicide Run		Punisher (vol. 2) #85–88; Punisher War Journal (vol. 1) #61–64; Punisher War Zone (vol. 1) #23–25	August 2017	TPB	978-1302906979
Punisher Invades the 'Nam		The 'Nam #52–53, 67–69	December 1994	TPB	978-0785100089
Punisher Invades the 'Nam		The 'Nam #52–53, 67–69; Punisher War Journal (vol. 1) #52–53; Punisher War Zone (vol. 1) #26–30	May 2018	TPB	978-1302911775

=== Limited series, one-shots and graphic novels ===
Title	Material collected	Publication date	Format	ISBN
The Punisher: Official Movie Adaptation	Amazing Spider-Man #129; The Punisher: Official Movie Adaptation #1–3	March 2004	TPB	978-0785114109
The Punisher: Very Special Holidays	Punisher: Red X-Mas #1; Punisher: Bloody Valentine #1; Punisher: Silent Night #1	November 2006	TPB	978-0785122203
Punisher: Year One	Punisher: Year One #1–4	June 2009	TPB	978-0785137368
Punisher Noir	Punisher Noir #1–4	March 2010 September 2010	HC TPB	978-0785139430 978-0785132769
Punisher: In the Blood	Punisher: In the Blood #1–5	May 2011	TPB	978-0785151814
Space: Punisher	Space: Punisher #1–4	December 2012	TPB	978-0785163671
Punisher: Nightmare	Punisher: Nightmare #1–5	April 2013	TPB	978-0785140726
Marvel Noir: Spider-Man / Punisher	Spider-Man Noir #1–4; Spider-Man: Eyes Without a Face #1–4; Punisher Noir #1–4	May 2013	TPB	978-0785183860
The Punisher: Return to Big Nothing	Epic Graphic Novel: The Punisher—Return to Big Nothing; Marvel Graphic Novel: The Punisher, Assassin's Guild; Marvel Graphic Novel: The Punisher: Intruder	July 2019	TPB	978-1302918965
The War of the Realms: Punisher	War of the Realms: Punisher #1–3; "The Face of a Warrior" story from War of the Realms: War Scrolls #3	October 2019	TPB	978-1302919054
Punisher Kill Krew	Punisher Kill Krew #1–5	January 2020	TPB	978-1302919030
Cosmic Ghost Rider
Cosmic Ghost Rider: Baby Thanos Must Die	Cosmic Ghost Rider #1–5	January 2019	TPB	978-1302913533
Cosmic Ghost Rider Destroys Marvel History	Cosmic Ghost Rider Destroys Marvel History #1–6	October 2019	TPB	978-1302913533
Revenge of the Cosmic Ghost Rider	Revenge of the Cosmic Ghost Rider #1–5	August 2020	TPB	978-1302921705
Marvel Cosmic Universe by Donny Cates Omnibus Vol. 1	Thanos (vol. 2) #13–18, Annual #1; Cosmic Ghost Rider #1–5; Death of The Inhumans #1-5; Silver Surfer: Black #1-5 and material from Thanos: Legacy	February 2021	HC	978-1302926823
Cosmic Ghost Rider Omnibus Vol. 1	Thanos (vol. 2) #13–18, Annual #1; Cosmic Ghost Rider #1–5; Guardians of the Galaxy (vol. 5) #1–6; Avengers (vol. 8) #22–25; Revenge of the Cosmic Ghost Rider #1–5; material from Thanos Legacy #1 and Wolverine: Black, White & Blood #2	July 2021	HC	978-1302929633
Crossovers and team-ups
Wolverine / Punisher: Revelation	Wolverine / Punisher: Revelation #1–4	February 2000	TPB	978-0785107293
Wolverine / Punisher	Wolverine / Punisher #1–5	October 2004	TPB	978-0785114321
Daredevil vs. Punisher: Means and Ends	Daredevil vs. Punisher #1–6	February 2006 May 2016	TPB	978-0785117452 978-1302901264 (new printing)
Punisher vs. Bullseye	Punisher vs. Bullseye #1–5	June 2006	TPB	978-0785117353
Marvel Universe vs. the Punisher	Marvel Universe vs. the Punisher #1–4	December 2010 June 2011	HC TPB	978-0785143550 978-0785145950
The Punisher vs. the Marvel Universe	Punisher Kills the Marvel Universe; Amazing Spider-Man (vol. 1) #161–162; Heroes for Hire (vol. 1) #9; Punisher (vol. 6) #33–37; Punisher War Zone (vol. 3) #1–5; Marvel Universe vs. Punisher #1–4	February 2016	TPB	978-0785195542
Daredevil / Punisher: Seventh Circle	Daredevil / Punisher: Seventh Circle #1–4	October 2016	TPB	978-1302902322
Ghost Rider Wolverine Punisher: Hearts of Darkness	Ghost Rider; Wolverine; Punisher: Hearts of Darkness	February 2017	TPB	978-1302904449
Punisher and Bullseye: Deadliest Hits	Bullseye: Perfect Game #1–2; Daredevil #500; Punisher: The Trial of the Punisher #1–2	February 2017	TPB	978-1302905781
Wolverine vs. The Punisher	Punisher War Journal (vol. 1) #6–7; Punisher War Zone (vol. 1) #19; Punisher (vol. 6) #16–17; Wolverine #186; Wolverine and The Punisher: Damaging Evidence #1–3; Wolverine / Punisher: Revelation #1–4; Wolverine / Punisher #1–5; "Wolverine & Punisher" stories from Astonishing Tales (vol. 2) #1–6	March 2017	TPB	978-1302903879
Doctor Strange / The Punisher: Magic Bullets	Doctor Strange / Punisher: Magic Bullets #1–4	August 2017	TPB	978-1302907181
Deadpool vs. the Punisher	Deadpool vs. The Punisher #1–5	August 2017	TPB	978-1302907488
MAX limited series and one-shots
The Punisher: Born	Born #1–4	January 2004 April 2016	TPB	978-0785110255 978-1302901738(new printing)
The Punisher: From First to Last	Punisher: The Tyger #1; Punisher: The Cell #1; Punisher: The End #1	December 2006 October 2008	HC TPB	978-0785122760 978-0785117155
Punisher Presents: Barracuda MAX	The Punisher Presents: Barracuda MAX #1–5	September 2007	TPB	978-0785124658
The Punisher: Naked Kills	Punisher MAX: Butterfly #1; Punisher MAX: Get Castle; Punisher MAX: Naked Kill; Punisher MAX Annual #1	August 2010	TPB	978-0785144212
Untold Tales of the Punisher MAX	Untold Tales of Punisher MAX #1–5	November 2012	TPB	978-0785165927
The Punisher: The Platoon	Punisher MAX: The Platoon #1–6	April 2018	TPB	978-0785190189
Punisher: Soviet	Punisher: Soviet #1–5	August 2020	TPB	978-1302913410
