= Sniper (comics) =

- Sniper on the cover of The Punisher War Journal #5 (April 1989); Art by Jim Lee and Carl Potts

Publication information
- Publisher: Marvel Comics
- First appearance: The Punisher War Journal #4 (March 1989)
- Created by: Jim Lee; Carl Potts

In-story information
- Full name: Rich von Burian
- Species: Human
- Place of origin: Earth-616
- Team affiliations: United States Marine Corps
- Abilities: Excellent armed and unarmed combatant Expert marksman Skilled pilot and computer hacker Use of rifle and push dagger

Sniper (Rich von Burian) is a supervillain appearing in American comic books published by Marvel Comics. Created by Carl Potts and Jim Lee, the character made his first appearance in The Punisher War Journal #4 (March 1989) as an enemy of the Punisher.

== Publication history ==
Sniper debuted in a two-part storyline consisting of The Punisher War Journal #4-5, and reappeared in The Punisher War Journal #10 and #21; the latter set-up the character's final appearance in the miniseries Wolverine and The Punisher: Damaging Evidence #1-3.

Sniper received a profile in Marvel Encyclopedia #5.

Another villainous assassin called Sniper previously appeared in Captain America's segment of Tales of Suspense #96.

== Fictional character biography ==
While touring in the Vietnam War, Rich von Burian served in the same unit as Frank Castle. After one firefight, Rich discovered that their commanding officer Ray Schoonover was smuggling cocaine out of the country in body bags. Rich kept this a secret, and he became an enforcer for Schoonover after the war. When Schoonover entered the running for the United States Senate, Schooner sent Rich (now having taken on the codename Sniper) after their unit's surviving members in the off-chance that any member were aware of these war crimes. The member's deaths drew the Punisher's attention who Sniper would have killed had the Punisher not driven him off with the Battle Van. The Punisher subsequently forced Schoonover to confess these crimes and commit suicide, and in a later battle overpowered Sniper who escaped by taking a hostage.

Sniper resurfaced in West Germany, where he stole a valuable attack helicopter from a military exercise. The Punisher and Microchip defeated Sniper who (while fleeing) crashed near the Berlin Wall. Sniper survived the crash but was disfigured. Later, Sniper was hired onto the Kingpin's roster of assassins by the Arranger.

When the Punisher attacked one of the Kingpin's drug operations, Sniper ambushed but the Punisher escaped. Afterward, the Kingpin ordered Sniper to act as backup for Damage who had been instructed to eliminate the Punisher after framing the vigilante for a series of murders. Agitated over the prospect of Damage robbing him of the honor of killing the Punisher, Sniper abandoned Damage when he was attacked by Wolverine, and tracked the Punisher down to a cemetery. After opening fire on a funeral, Sniper took a woman and a child hostage, and tried to force the Punisher to choose which one of them the Punisher should shoot. The Punisher instead got close enough to stab Sniper who bled to death in an open grave.

== Skills and abilities ==
A former member of the United States Marine Corps, Sniper was an expert marksman, excelled at armed and unarmed combat, and was a skilled pilot and computer hacker. His main weapons were a rifle, and a push dagger.

== Other versions ==
=== Earth X ===
Sniper is a denizen of the Realm of the Dead, appearing alongside the Punisher's other deceased foes such as Jigsaw, Bushwacker, the Kingpin, and the Jackal.
