= Damage (Marvel Comics) =

- Damage in Wolverine and The Punisher: Damaging Evidence #3 (November 1993); Art by Gary Erskine

Publication information
- Publisher: Marvel Comics
- First appearance: The Punisher War Journal #8 (September 1989)
- Created by: Jim Lee; Carl Potts

In-story information
- Alter ego: Jaime Ortiz
- Species: Human Cyborg
- Place of origin: Earth
- Team affiliations: Bunsen Burners
- Notable aliases: Punisher
- Abilities: Cyborg enhancements

Damage (Jaime Ortiz) is a supervillain appearing in American comic books published by Marvel Comics. He is an enemy of the Punisher and Wolverine.

== Publication history ==
Created by Carl Potts and Jim Lee, the character made his first appearance in The Punisher War Journal #8 (September 1989),

Damage's first appearance was as a gang leader in The Punisher War Journal #8. After nearly dying in that issue, the character was rebuilt into a cyborg in a story arc that lasted from The Punisher War Journal #17-20 to Wolverine and the Punisher: Damaging Evidence #1-3.

Damage received a profile in Marvel Encyclopedia #5, which revealed his real name is Jaime Ortiz.

== Fictional character biography ==
The head of a Manhattan street gang known as the Bunsen Burners, Damage became aware that the Punisher was after him, so he decided to make a preemptive strike against the vigilante by hijacking or destroying his Battle Van. While his underlings were killed by the Battle Van's automated defenses, Damage made it into the vehicle, where he was ensnared and crippled by its mechanical tentacles and coils. The trapped Damage was later found by the Punisher, who dropped him off at a hospital, having concluded that letting Damage live out the rest of his life in the mangled state he was in would be punishment enough.

The Arranger, having been given the assignment of finding and recruiting new assassins for the Kingpin, discovered Damage through a newspaper article, and arranged for him to be moved to a private clinic, where surgeons set about reconstructing him into a cyborg. When Damage began to die on the operating table, the Arranger inspired him to continue fighting for survival by reminding him of his hatred for the Punisher.

When Damage's transformation was complete, he was further augmented by technology supplied by Donald Pierce, and made to resemble the Punisher, in order to frame him for a series of murders. The killings drew the attention of Wolverine, who tracked Damage down to a chemical plant, where the two fought. Damage had the upper hand until the Punisher, who was preoccupied with the Sniper, suddenly appeared and set Damage ablaze before knocking him into a vat of flammable chemicals, which exploded and killed him. The Kingpin had Damage's remains recovered, and sent them to Pierce, along with fifty million dollars to pay for his reconstruction.

== Powers and abilities ==
As a cyborg, Damage possessed superhuman strength and durability, as well as numerous retractable weapons such as a grenade launcher, a flamethrower, and a minigun. He also had infrared vision, and could electrocute others by touching them.

== In other media ==
Damage appears in The Punisher, voiced by Steve Blum. This version is the leader of a gang of small-time drug traffickers and the owner of a crack house.
