= Rachel Cole =

Comic book character

- Rachel Cole in The Punisher Vol. 9, #10 (April 2012); Art by Marco Checchetto

Publication information
- Publisher: Marvel Comics
- First appearance: The Punisher Vol. 9, #1 (August 2011)
- Created by: Greg Rucka; Marco Checchetto

In-story information
- Full name: Rachel Cole
- Species: Human
- Place of origin: Earth
- Team affiliations: United States Marine Corps
- Partnerships: Punisher
- Supporting character of: Punisher
- Notable aliases: Rachel Cole-Alves/Rachel Alves (former married name)

Rachel Cole is a fictional character appearing in American comic books published by Marvel Comics. The character is usually depicted as a vigilante, and ally of the antihero the Punisher. She was created by Greg Rucka and Marco Checchetto, and first appeared in The Punisher Vol. 9, #1 (August 2011).

== Publication history ==
Rachel Cole debuted in the premiere issue of The Punisher Vol. 9, and was present in all but two of the subsequent fifteen entries of the run, her absences being in Issues #7 and #11. Rachel was also included in the Omega Effect storyline, which consisted of Avenging Spider-Man #6, The Punisher Vol. 9, #10, and Daredevil Vol. 3, #11.

Following The Punisher Vol. 9, Rachel had a role in all five issues of Punisher War Zone Vol. 3, and a part in Issues #11-12 of The Punisher Vol. 10.

== Fictional character biography ==
=== The Punisher ===
A Marine Sergeant, Rachel Cole served multiple tours in Afghanistan, her actions there garnering her a Silver Star. At some point, she met Daniel Alves, a trauma surgeon stationed at Lenox Hill Hospital; the two fell in love, and got married in New York City.

Two hours after the wedding, the reception was crashed by minions of the Owl, who were being pursued by members of a burgeoning criminal syndicate called the Exchange. To ensure the elimination of their targets, the Exchange operatives opened fire on the reception, killing everyone except Rachel, who was hospitalized in critical condition. In the months she spent recovering, returning to her maiden name, Rachel befriended Daily Bugle reporter Norah Winters, through whom she learned of the Exchange. Wanting revenge, Rachel infiltrated a gathering of Exchange higher-ups in North Creek, and massacred it; she was then confronted by the Punisher, who was also working on dismantling the Exchange. After a brief standoff, Rachel and the Punisher parted ways, the Punisher telling Rachel, "Stay out of my way".

After she saves him from a group of Black Spectre agents, the Punisher allies with Rachel, giving her body armor with his skull insignia on it. Together, the two attempt to acquire the Omega Drive, a device containing data on Black Spectre, as well other terrorist groups such as A.I.M., Hydra, Agence Byzantine, and the Secret Empire. This leads to a temporary alliance with Daredevil (the current owner of the Omega Drive) and Spider-Man. Rachel betrays the others, taking the Omega Drive for herself, but she is convinced to give it back by Daredevil. The Punisher then goes in search of Rachel, and finds her through Norah, who had been visited by Rachel. Rachel and the Punisher fight over her recklessness and the wedding picture that Rachel had asked Norah to get for her, the brawl ending with the Punisher giving a Rachel a "pep talk" that prompts her to burn the photograph of herself and Daniel.

Rachel proceeds to help the Punisher infiltrate a supervillain auction so that they can steal the adamantium casing of one of Doctor Octopus's tentacles. Rachel then gains access to the Exchange's headquarters by claiming to want to sell the tentacle, and meets the organization's leader, a woman named Stephanie Gerard. After the Punisher shatters the nigh-indestructible windows of Stephanie's office with an adamantium-tipped bullet, Rachel sets off a gas grenade hidden within the hollowed-out tentacle, and garrotes Stephanie while the Punisher uses one of Spider-Man's web-shooters to enter the room, and kill Stephanie's entourage.

Stephanie's besmirched second-in-command, mad with grief over his employer's death, calls 911 on the Punisher, then embarks on a murderous rampage, which claims the lives of twelve bystanders, and two police officers. The NYPD breach the Exchange's building, and in the chaos that ensues, the Punisher kills Stephanie's second-in-command, while Rachel accidentally shoots a detective in the throat. Rachel and the Punisher escape, but the former, overcome with guilt over the detective's death, contacts Norah, and confesses to her involvement with the Punisher, while also trying to make it clear that Stephanie's second-in-command was responsible for the massacre that is being blamed on her and the Punisher. Rachel subsequently attempts suicide by cop, but this fails due to the Punisher tampering with her gun and incapacitating all but one of the officers sent after her. Rachel breaks down, wailing, "You bastard, Castle... why did you let me live?"

=== War Zone ===
Rachel is arrested, tried, and sentenced to death for the murders of the detective and the two officers, in what her attorney, Matt Murdock, regards as an instance of railroading intended to harm the Punisher. While imprisoned, Rachel (who had not protested what was she had been charged with) is visited by a disguised Black Widow, who is searching for the Punisher on behalf of the Avengers. Rachel claims to not know where the Punisher is, asserting, "This is on me, these are my crimes. You will not find him. You will not use me to find him. You leave the Punisher out of this... he's gone. He's not coming back."

The Punisher, despite being hunted by the Avengers, frees Rachel (which she initially protests) with the help of Wolverine. Knowing his capture by the Avengers is inevitable, the Punisher gives Rachel everything she needs to relocate, and reassures her by saying, "The mission isn't the man, sergeant. It never was". Rachel is next shown gunning down a pair of muggers in Hollywood.

=== Return ===
After the Punisher escapes from a Costa Rican prison, he calls Rachel (who he refers to as "the one person I can still trust") to give him a lift back to the United States. When the Punisher expresses doubts about continuing his mission, Rachel inspires him to keep going, and the two drive back to Los Angeles. Once in the city, the Punisher has Rachel drop him off at the home of his current weapons supplier, a military armory officer named Tuggs.

When Black Widow puts out a call for backup to help her and the Punisher combat Baron Zemo and Mayor Wilson Fisk, the only heroes who bother to respond are Rachel, Night Thrasher, and Moon Knight. Rachel is captured by Zemo and Jigsaw during a battle with the Thunderbolts, but is rescued by the Punisher, who is forced to non-fatally shoot through Rachel to get to Zemo.

== In other media ==
Rachel Cole appears as an "enhanced costume" for the Punisher in Marvel Heroes, voiced by Kimberly Brooks. She is a playable character in Marvel Strike Force.
