= The Punisher War Journal (1988 series) =

American comic book series

- Cover to issue 11, art by Jim Lee.

Publication information
- Publisher: Marvel Comics
- Schedule: Monthly
- Format: Ongoing series
- Publication date: 1988-1995
- No. of issues: 80
- Main character: Punisher

Creative team
- Created by: Mike Baron; Carl Potts; Roger Salick; John Wellington
- Written by: Carl Potts (1-15, 17-24), Mike Baron (16, 25-37), Steven Grant (50, 65-75), Chuck Dixon (38-42, 44-64, 75-80), Richard Rainey (43), Roger Salick (64), John Wellington (4)
- Artist(s): Neil Hansen; Jim Lee; Carl Potts; Dave Ross - 'David H. Ross'; Steve Biasi; Danny Bulanadi; Russ Heath Jr. Donald C. 'Don' Hudson; Klaus R. Janson; Allen 'Al' Milgrom; Kenneth Rubenoff; Mark Texeira - 'TEX'; Scott Williams; John Wellington; Gregory A. Wright; Ken Bruzenak; Ken Lopez; James R. 'Jim' Novak; Richard 'Rick' Parker
- Penciller(s): Neil Hansen; Jim Lee; Carl Potts; Dave Ross - 'David H. Ross'
- Inker(s): Steve Biasi; Danny Bulanadi; Russ Heath Jr. Donald C. 'Don' Hudson; Klaus R. Janson; Allen 'Al' Milgrom; Kenneth Rubenoff; Mark Texeira - 'TEX'; Scott Williams
- Letterer(s): Ken Bruzenak; Ken Lopez; James R. 'Jim' Novak; Richard 'Rick' Parker
- Colorist(s): John Wellington; Gregory A. Wright
- Editor(s): Mark D. Beazley; Sarah Brunstad; Kelly P. Corvese; Don Daley; Carl Potts; Rob Tokar; Mike Baron

The Punisher War Journal is an American comic book series published from 1988 to 1995 by Marvel Comics featuring the character Frank Castle, also known as the vigilante the Punisher. It was the first ever spin-off for the character and the first series of the title The Punisher War Journal. It lasted for 80 issues and featured varying artists, including early works of Jim Lee and writers, most notably Carl Potts who had worked as an editor on the main Punisher series before.

== Background ==
The series was made due to the character's immense popularity at the time. Marvel had previously used the character in guest appearances to boost the sales of other titles, but decided to publish a second ongoing title for the Punisher which became this series. Mike Baron, the series' editor and one of the writers, expressed in a 1988 interview that the character's popularity came at a time when American citizens were especially angry with society's failure to punish evil.

== Plot ==
The series consists of several story arcs, including "An Eye For An Eye", "Firepower Among The Ruins", "The Sicilian Saga", "The Kamchatkan Konspiracy", "Pariah!" and "Last Entry" which were confined within the series itself and other arcs such as "Acts of Vengeance", "Dead Man's Hand" and "Suicide Run" which were part of larger Marvel events. The final arc, "Countdown", was a crossover between all the ongoing Punisher series at the time.

== Reception ==
The series was hugely popular upon its original release. Because of the series success Marvel put together a promo tour for the creators of the books. They visited numerous comic book stores in California and Hawaii and interacted with the fans there. Its popularity also prompted Marvel to publish a third ongoing Punisher series named The Punisher War Zone. Though the popularity fell later in the run as it did with the two other Punisher titles at the time, The Punisher and The Punisher War Zone due to extensive overexposure of the character at the time. The series greatly contributed to the characters independent success outside of being a supporting character. The series, especially Potts' writing, influenced Charles Forsman's series Revenger. The series featured the first meeting of Wolverine and the Punisher in issue 6, named "On the Track of Unknown Animals", which was described by Blair Marnell of Comingsoon.net as a memorable meeting, and was voted as the 75th greatest issue of any Marvel series ever in 2001. Greg Burgas of Comic Book Resources praised Lee's artwork.

== Content ==
While still under the Comics Code Authority the series featured bodily violence which had not been previously used in Marvel comics publications. The series also featured more guns, explosions and highly sexualized women.

== Prints ==
=== Issues ===
1. An Eye For An Eye, Chapter 1: Sunday In The Park, November 1988
2. An Eye For An Eye, Chapter 1: Tie A Yellow Ribbon, December 1988
3. An Eye For An Eye, Chapter 1: A Dish Best Served Cold, February 1989
4. Sniper, March 1989
5. Crucible, April 1989
6. On The Track Of Unknown Animals, June 1989
7. Endangered Species, July 1989
8. Damage, September 1989
9. Guilt Trip, October 1989
10. Second Shot, November 1989
11. Shock Treatment, Mid November 1989
12. Acts Of Vengeance: Contrast In Sin, December 1989
13. Acts Of Vengeance: Confession, Mid December 1989
14. Blind Faith, January 1990
15. Headlines!, February 1990
16. Panhandle, March 1990
17. Tropical Trouble, April 1990
18. Kahuna, May 1990
19. Trauma In Paradise!, June 1990
20. The Debt, July 1990
21. Deep Water, August 1990
22. Snowstorm, September 1990
23. Firepower Among The Ruins, part 1, October 1990
24. Firepower Among The Ruins, part 2, November 1990
25. The Sicilian Saga, part 1: Get Out Of Town, December 1990
26. The Sicilian Saga, part 2: Cry Uncle, January 1991
27. The Sicilian Saga, part 3: Saracen With The Clock!, February 1991
28. Meat, March 1991
29. Crash And Burn, April 1991
30. Spin Cycle, May 1991
31. The Kamchatkan Konspiracy, part 1: Pipeline, June 1991
32. The Kamchatkan Konspiracy, part 2: Blowout, July 1991
33. The Kamchatkan Konspiracy, part 3: Fire In The Hole, August 1991
34. Blackout, September 1991
35. Motivation, October 1991
36. Let Them Eat Cake, November 1991
37. Controversy, December 1991
38. Terminal Velocity, January 1992
39. Slay Ride, February 1992
40. Good Money After Bad, March 1992
41. Armageddon Express, April 1992
42. Ten-To-One, May 1992
43. Adirondack Haunts, June 1992
44. Barbarians, July 1992
45. Dead Man's Hand, part 3: The Vegas Idea, August 1992
46. Dead Man's Hand, part 6: Hot Chrome And Cold Blood, September 1992
47. Dead Man's Hand, part 9: Say Goodbye To Vegas, October 1992
48. Walk Through Fire, part 1: Backs To The Wall, November 1992
49. Walk Through Fire, part 2: A Gunfight, December 1992
50. Unfriendly Skies, January 1993
51. Walk Through Fire, part 3: Sidewinder, February 1993
52. Heart of Ice, March 1993
53. Heart Of Stone, April 1993
54. Surface Thrill, May 1993
55. Bad Boyz, June 1993
56. 24 Hours Of Power!, July 1993
57. Blood Money, August 1993
58. Blood Red Moon, September 1993
59. The House That Hate Built, October 1993
60. Dogged, November 1993
61. ________ Part of Suicide Run, December 1993
62. Suicide Run, part 4: Standing In The Shadows, January 1994
63. Suicide Run, part 7: Known Associates, February 1994
64. ________ Part of Suicide Run, March 1994
65. Pariah!, April 1994
66. Pariah, Part 2: Last Exit, May 1994
67. Pariah, part 3: Nailed, June 1994
68. Pariah, part 4: Bad Turn, July 1994
69. Pariah, The Conclusion: Strict Time!, August 1994
70. Last Entry, prelude: Warm Bodies, September 1994
71. Last Entry, part 1: Road To Death!, October 1994
72. Last Entry, part 2: Truck Stop Women!, November 1994
73. Last Entry, part 3: A Journal Of The Plague Years!, December 1994
74. Last Entry, part 4: Deadstop!, January 1995
75. Last Entry, part 5: Conclusion!, February 1995
76. Stone Dead, March 1995
77. Bound By Blood, April 1995
78. One Wicked Day, May 1995
79. Countdown: 3: House Of The Dead, June 1995
80. Countdown: 0: The Last Bad Man, July 1995

=== Collected editions ===
Title	Format	Material collected	Pages	Publication date	ISBN UPC	Rated
The Punisher: An Eye for an Eye	Trade Paperback (TPB)	The Punisher War Journal (1988) #1-3	80	1992	0871357771; 978-0871357779	—N/a
The Punisher War Journal by Carl Potts and Jim Lee	TPB	The Punisher War Journal (1988) #1-19; The Punisher (1987) - Annual 02 "Knight Fight"	504	September 14, 2016	978-1-302-90107-3	T+

== See also ==
- 1988 in comics
- 1995 in comics
