= The Punisher (1987 series) =

1987 comic book series

- Cover to The Punisher vol 2 (1987 series), #1.

Publication information
- Publisher: Marvel Comics
- Schedule: Monthly
- Format: Ongoing series
- Publication date: July 1987 – July 1995
- No. of issues: 104, 7 annuals
- Main character: Punisher

Creative team
- Written by: Mike Baron (1-44, 46-48, 50-62, 76, Annual #1-4), Chuck Dixon (45, 49, 63, 89-104), Dan Abnett (64-75, 82-84, 94-95), Roger Salick (75, 77-79, Annual #1-3), Steven Grant (80-81, 85-88)
- Artist: Various

The Punisher is the first ongoing comic book series starring the fictional Marvel Comics vigilante The Punisher, following The Punisher limited series published the previous year. The series ran 104 issues from July 1987 to July 1995.

== Publication history ==
It became the flagship of a popular franchise that would grow to include such titles as The Punisher War Journal and The Punisher War Zone, as well as several miniseries. This series also spawned seven annuals from 1988 to 1994, as well as the annuals The Punisher Summer Special #1-4 (1991–1994), The Punisher: Back to School Special #1-3 (1992–1994), and The Punisher Holiday Special #1-3 (1993–1995).

== Prints ==
=== Issues ===
1. Marching Powder
2. Bolivia
3. The Devil Came from Kansas!
4. The Rev
5. Ministry of Death
6. Garbage
7. Wild Rose
8. The Ghost of Wall Street
9. Insider Trading
10. The Creep
11. Second Sight
12. Castle Technique
13. Sacrifice Play
14. Social Studies
15. To Topple the Kingpin
16. Escalation
17. Computer War
18. Face Off
19. The Spider
20. Bad Tip
21. The Boxer
22. Ninja Training Camp
23. Capture the Flag!
24. Land of the Eternal Sun
25. Sunset in Kansas
26. The Whistle Blower
27. Your Tax Dollars at Work
28. AoV - Change Partners & Dance
29. AoV - Too many Dooms
30. Confession
31. Crankin'
32. Speedy Solution
33. Reaver Fever
34. Exo-Skeleton
35. Jigsaw Puzzle 01
36. Jigsaw Puzzle 02
37. Jigsaw Puzzle 03
38. Jigsaw Puzzle 04
39. Jigsaw Puzzle 05
40. Jigsaw Puzzle 06
41. Should a Gentleman offer a Tiparillo to a Lady
42. St. Paradine's
43. Border Run
44. Flag Burner
45. One Way Fare
46. Cold Cache
47. The Brattle Gun 01
48. The Brattle Gun 02
49. Death below Zero
50. Yo Yo
51. Golden Buddha
52. Lupe
53. The Final Days 01
54. The Final Days 02
55. The Final Days 03
56. The Final Days 04
57. The Final Days 05
58. The Final Days 06
59. The Final Days 07
60. Escape from New York
61. Crackdown
62. Fade... to white
63. The Big Check-Out
64. Eurohit 01
65. Eurohit 02
66. Eurohit 03
67. Eurohit 04
68. Eurohit 05
69. Eurohit 06
70. Eurohit 07
71. Loose Ends
72. Life during Wartime
73. Police Action 01
74. Police Action 02
75. Police Action 03
76. Lava
77. Survival 01
78. Survival 02
79. Survival 03
80. Last Confession
81. Bodies of Evidence
82. Firefight 01
83. Firefight 02
84. Firefight 03
85. Suicide Run 00
86. Suicide Run 03
87. Suicide Run 06
88. Suicide Run 09
89. Fortress Miami 01
90. Fortress Miami 02
91. Fortress Miami 03
92. Fortress Miami 04
93. Killing Streets
94. No Rules 01
95. No Rules 02
96. Raving Beauty
97. The Devil's Secret Name
98. Armies of the Night
99. Bury me Deep
100. The Cage
101. Dead Tomorrows
102. Under the Gun
103. Countdown 04
104. Countdown 01

=== Annuals ===
1. 1988 - Evolutionary War (02 of 11)
2. 1989 - Atlantis Attacks (05 of 14)
3. 1990 - Lifeform (1 of 4)
4. 1991 - Von Strucker Gambit (2 of 3)
5. 1992 - The System Bytes (1 of 4)
6. 1993 - Eradikation
7. 1994 - Eurohit '94

== Bibliography ==
- Punisher #1-104 (July 1987 – July 1995)
- Punisher Annual #1-7 (1988–1994)
- The Punisher Summer Special #1-4 (1991–1994)
- The Punisher: Back to School Special #1-3 (1992–1994)
- The Punisher Holiday Special #1-3 (1993–1995)

== Collected editions ==
- Essential Punisher, Vol. 2 (collects The Punisher vol. 2, #1-20, Annual #1), 2007, ISBN 978-0-7851-2734-5
- Essential Punisher, Vol. 3 (collects The Punisher vol. 2, #21-40, Annual #2-3), 2009, ISBN 978-0-7851-3073-4
- Essential Punisher, Vol. 4 (collects The Punisher vol. 2, #41-59, Annual #4-5), 2012, ISBN 978-07851-6351-0

== See also ==
- 1987 in comics
