= The Punisher (2011 series) =

2011 Marvel comic book series

- Variant incentive cover art to The Punisher (2011) #1. Art by Neal Adams.

Publication information
- Publisher: Marvel Comics
- Schedule: Monthly
- Format: Ongoing series
- Genre: Superhero
- Publication date: August 2011 – September 2012
- No. of issues: 16
- Main character(s): Frank Castle/The Punisher; Rachel Cole

Creative team
- Created by: Greg Rucka; Marco Checchetto
- Written by: Greg Rucka
- Artist: Marco Checchetto

The Punisher is a Marvel comic book series featuring the character Frank Castle, also known as the Punisher, written by Greg Rucka. This series of The Punisher continues the tradition of Matt Fraction's War Journal series and Rick Remender's previous Punisher series and places the character firmly in the ongoings of the larger Marvel Universe, interacting with other superheroes like Spider-Man, the Avengers, and Wolverine more frequently than before.

Although the series' first issue was released at the time of the Fear Itself event, Rucka stated his intent to focus the series solely on the Punisher's exploits without having larger Marvel U events interfere with the flow of the series, but if need be, could interact with other heroes when the story called for it.

== Story ==
The series, although being a self-titled Punisher ongoing, does not have many internal monologues, nor does Castle speak often throughout the series. It's instead focused on the impact that the Punisher's actions have on those around him, and the repercussions those actions create for other characters involved in the story. In the first arc, Castle is committed to taking down a criminal organization known as "The Exchange," and is later joined by a former Marine whose husband was murdered on the couple's wedding day.

The grief-stricken wife, Rachel Cole, seeks the Punisher out and the two create a bond due to their mutual time in the United States Marine Corps. Cole (who insists on being addressed by her married name of Alves) serves under Castle's command, and the two treat each target they seek to kill as a two-man military operation with Castle maintaining a command structure.

Midway through the series, Cole and the Punisher become involved in one of Daredevil's exploits, who is holding a device called the "Omega Drive" containing damning information on all the major crime organizations in the Marvel Universe. The Punisher wants the device for obvious reasons, as it would give him a multitude of new targets to neutralize. Spider-Man also becomes involved, and the story is told in one issue of Avenging Spider-Man, one issue of Daredevil, and one issue of The Punisher.

== Follow-up ==
The series concluded with issue #16, at which point Rucka and Checcetto moved on to a 5-issue mini-series entitled Punisher: War Zone to finish their story. The War Zone series involves the Punisher's operations in the final issues of the ongoing series attracting the attention of the Avengers. This was Rucka's final story with the Punisher as of 2017.

== Collected editions ==
- Punisher by Greg Rucka Vol. 1 (collects The Punisher vol. 9, #1-5), February 2012
- Punisher by Greg Rucka Vol. 2 (collects The Punisher vol. 9, #6-10, Avenging Spider-Man #6, and Daredevil vol. 3 #11), September 2012
- Punisher by Greg Rucka Vol. 3 (collects The Punisher vol. 9, #11-16), March 2013

== See also ==
- 2011 in comics

== Sources ==
- Khouri, Andy (August 3, 2011). "Greg Rucka Returns to Superheroes with Risky, Rewarding 'Punisher' #1 Preview". ComicsAlliance.
- Goellner, Caleb (March 19, 2011). "Greg Rucka Gets the Keys to Frank's Castle With 'The Punisher #1′ in August". ComicsAlliance.
- Hudson, Laura (May 27, 2011). "Parting Shot: A Wine-Stained First Look at Greg Rucka's 'Punisher' #1". ComicsAlliance.
- Khouri, Andy (September 6, 2011). "It's Frank Castle Versus The Vulture In 'The Punisher' #3 Preview". ComicsAlliance.
- Brothers, David (June 6, 2012). "The Originals: Greg Rucka and Perfect Structure". ComicsAlliance.
- Hudson, Laura (August 5, 2011). "Greg Rucka on the 'Punisher' Relaunch, and Why Frank Castle is a Priest of Vengeance". ComicsAlliance.
- Sims, Chris (September 19, 2014). "Greg Rucka Reflects On His Batman Work, Part 3". ComicsAlliance.
- McMillen, Graeme (September 21, 2012). "Rucka Talks Creator Relations At Marvel, DC: "I'm Sick To Death Of The Way The Big Two Treat People"". ComicsAlliance.
- Shiach, Kieran (November 29, 2016). "Uncompromising Visions: Celebrating The Career Of Greg Rucka". ComicsAlliance.
- Goellner, Caleb (January 12, 2012). "The Punisher, Daredevil and Spider-Man to Team in Marvel's 'The Omega Effect'". ComicsAlliance.
- Shiach, Kieran (March 14, 2016). "Get To Know Elektra and Punisher In Comixology's 'Daredevil' Sale". ComicsAlliance.
- Khouri, Andy (July 23, 2011). "The Spider-Man Panel: Spider-Island, Punisher, Daredevil, Return of the Spider-Clone Comic-Con". ComicsAlliance.
- Wilson, Matt D. (September 5, 2012). "Way and Dillon's 'Thunderbolts' Brings a MAX Flavor to Marvel NOW Review". ComicsAlliance.
- Brown, Luke (October 7, 2015). "Sideshow's Punisher Figure is Dressed for Success and Vengeance". ComicsAlliance.
- "'Pacific Rim' OGN, Geoff Johns' Avengers and First Marvel NOW Trades Among Marvel Collected Editions for May 2013 Solicitations". ComicsAlliance. February 15, 2013.
- Sims, Chris (August 16, 2013). "Ask Chris #160: Gettin' Older". ComicsAlliance.
