= Punisher P.O.V. =

1991 Marvel comic book series

- Cover to Punisher P.O.V. #4 (1991).

Publication information
- Publisher: Marvel Comics
- Format: Limited series
- Genre: Superhero
- Publication date: 1991
- No. of issues: 4
- Main character(s): Punisher

Creative team
- Written by: Jim Starlin
- Artist(s): Bernie Wrightson

Punisher P.O.V. is a four-issue comic book limited series featuring Frank Castle, also known as the Punisher. The series was published in 1991 and written by Jim Starlin with art by Bernie Wrightson.

== Publication history ==
1. Book One: Foresight, July 1991
2. Book Two: Extrospection, August 1991
3. Book Three: Introspection, September 1991
4. Book Four: Hindsight, December 1991

== Plot ==
The four-issue series revolves around the Punisher hunting down a former 1960s radical who was released from prison only to be horribly disfigured when a bomb he and his friend were working on exploded. After exposure to toxic waste, the disfigured radical becomes almost unkillable due to the chemicals mutating him, giving him an accelerated healing factor.

== See also ==
- 1991 in comics
