= The Punisher (2001 series) =

2001 Marvel Comics comic book series

- Cover of The Punisher vol. 6, 32 (November 2003), art by Tim Bradstreet

Publication information
- Publisher: Marvel Comics; Marvel Knights
- Schedule: Monthly
- Format: Ongoing series
- Genre: Crime
- Publication date: August 2001 – February 2004
- No. of issues: 37
- Main character(s): Punisher

Creative team
- Written by: Garth Ennis (#1-6, 13-37); Steve Dillon (#7); Ron Zimmerman (#8); Tom Peyer (#9-12)
- Artist(s): Manuel Gutierrez (#9-12); Darick Robertson (#15-17)
- Penciller(s): Steve Dillon (#1-7, 13-14, 18-23, 32); Mike Lilly (#8)
- Inker(s): Jimmy Palmiotti (#1-7); Rodney Ramos (#8)
- Letterer(s): Comicraft; Wes Abbott; Richard Starkings
- Colorist(s): Chris Sotomayor (#1-7); Steve Oliff (#8-11, 13); Andy Troy (#12)
- Editor(s): Nanci Dakesian; Stuart Moore

The Punisher is the sixth eponymous Marvel Comics comic book series featuring the character Frank Castle, also known as the Punisher. It consists of 37 issues as part of the Marvel Knights imprint. Most of the issues in this series are written by Garth Ennis; however, Tom Peyer, Steve Dillon, and Ron Zimmerman also feature as writers.

== Publication history ==
The series continues on from Ennis' The Punisher 2000 limited series. The Russian, who was decapitated in the previous series, is resurrected using stolen S.H.I.E.L.D. technology and returns as one of the main antagonists in this series.

== Reception ==
The series holds an average rating of 5.1 by eight professional critics on the review aggregation website Comic Book Roundup.

== Collected editions ==
The series has been collected into individual volumes. However, The Punisher #8-12 of vol. 6 were not written by Ennis and are not collected among the following volumes. Instead, the issues were collected in a separate paperback titled Marvel Knights Punisher by Peyer & Gutierrez: Taxi Wars. Included in the lone paperback is PUNISHER X-MAS SPECIAL (2006) #1, SPIDER-MAN VS. PUNISHER #1 and material from MARVEL KNIGHTS DOUBLE-SHOT #4 ISBN 1302916335

Paperback:

- Volume 1: Welcome Back, Frank (collects The Punisher vol. 5, #1-12), June 2001, ISBN 978-0-7851-0783-5 (Panini, ISBN 1-904159-21-4)
- Volume 2: Army of One (collects The Punisher vol. 6, #1-7), February 2002, ISBN 978-0-7851-0839-9
- Volume 3: Business As Usual (collects The Punisher vol. 6, #13-18), November 2003, ISBN 978-0-7851-1014-9
- Volume 4: Full Auto (collects The Punisher vol. 6, #20-26), July 2003, ISBN 978-0-7851-1149-8
- Volume 5: Streets of Laredo (collects The Punisher vol. 6, #19, 27-32), December 2003, ISBN 978-0-7851-1096-5
- Volume 6: Confederacy of Dunces (collects The Punisher vol. 6, #33-37), July 2004, ISBN 978-0-7851-1344-7

Hardcover:

- Volume 1 (collects The Punisher vol. 5, #1-12; Marvel Knights: Double Shot #1; Punisher Kills the Marvel Universe), June 2002, ISBN 978-0-7851-0982-2
- Volume 2 (collects The Punisher vol. 6, #1-7, 13-18), June 2003, ISBN 978-0-7851-1170-2
- Volume 3 (collects The Punisher vol. 6, #19-27), March 2004, ISBN 978-0-7851-1317-1

The Complete Collections:

- Marvel Knights Punisher by Garth Ennis: The Complete Collection Vol. 1, (collects The Punisher vol. 5, #1-12; The Punisher vol. 6, #1-5, Marvel Knights: Double Shot #1; Punisher Kills the Marvel Universe), December 2018, ISBN 978-1302914080
- Marvel Knights Punisher by Garth Ennis: The Complete Collection Vol. 2, (collects The Punisher vol. 6, #6-7, #13-26; Material From Marvel Knights Double Shot #1), March 2019, ISBN 978-1302916077
- Marvel Knights Punisher by Garth Ennis: The Complete Collection Vol. 3, (collects The Punisher vol. 6, #27-37; Punisher: War Zone vol. 1, #1-6), June 2019, ISBN 978-1302918651

== See also ==
- 2001 in comics
