= The Punisher: War Zone (2008 series) =

Marvel Comics limited series

- Issue six cover by Steve Dillon

Publication information
- Publisher: Marvel Comics
- Schedule: Weekly
- Format: Limited series
- Publication date: 2008
- No. of issues: 6
- Main character: Punisher

Creative team
- Created by: Garth Ennis
- Written by: Garth Ennis
- Artist: Steve Dillon
- Penciller: Steve Dillon
- Inker: Steve Dillon
- Letterer: Cory Petit
- Colorist: Matthew 'Matt' Hollingsworth
- Editor(s): Axel Alonso; Mark D. Beazley; John Denning; Sebastian Girner; Jennifer Grünwald; Daniel Ketchum; Cory Levine; Joe Quesada; Alex Starbuck; Jeff Youngquist

The Punisher: War Zone Vol. 2, is the second volume in the Punisher: War Zone series is a comic book limited series published by Marvel Comics about the vigilante The Punisher. The series was written by Garth Ennis and drawn by Steve Dillon. Dillon also drew all of the covers to the series. The series is a follow-up to Ennis and Dillon's previous limited series work and marked the end of Ennis's eight-year-long run with the character.

== Plot ==
The plot of the series concerns Ma Gnucci who was believed to have been killed when Frank Castle (The Punisher) fed her to a polar bear but it seems instead that she survived and has to spend her life as a paraplegic without arms or legs. She sets out to use her family to get revenge on Castle.

== Reception ==
The series holds an average rating of 7.6 by 20 professional critics on the review aggregation website Comic Book Roundup.

The series marked a return to a humorous portrayal of the character of the Punisher, something which Ennis had not done for some time due to working under the Marvel Max line which focused more on serious stories.

== Prints ==
=== Issues ===
No.	Title	Cover date	Comic Book Roundup rating	Estimated sales (North America)
#1	The Resurrection of Ma Gnucci, Part One	February 2009	7.0 by four critics.	36,420, ranked 67th first month
#2	The Resurrection of Ma Gnucci, Part Two: Some People Just Refuse to Stay Dead	February 2009	7.8 by four critics.	29,738, ranked 86th first month
#3	The Resurrection of Ma Gnucci, Part Three: So Evil, Hell Spat Her Back Out Again	February 2009	8.0 by two critics.	28,420, ranked 89th first month
#4	The Resurrection of Ma Gnucci, Part Four: We're Going to Need a Bigger Bodybag	February 2009	7.5 by three critics.	27,345, ranked 92nd first month
#5	The Resurrection of Ma Gnucci, Part Five: Just Keep Her Away from Polar Bears	February 2009	7.3 by four critics.	26,053, ranked 69th first month
#6	The Resurrection of Ma Gnucci, Part Six: Give Em' Hell Frank!	March 2009	7.8 by three critics.	25,378, ranked 73rd first month

=== Collected editions ===
Title	Format	Material collected	Pages	Publication date	ISBN	Estimated sales (North America) [Trades]	Rated
Punisher: War Zone: The Resurrection of Ma Gnucci (two versions, regular and direct market)	Hardcover	Punisher: War Zone (2009) #1-6	144	April 15, 2009	978-0-7851-3822-8	2,392, ranked 35th first month	PAL
Punisher: War Zone: The Resurrection of Ma Gnucci	Trade paperback	Punisher: War Zone (2009) #1-6	144	August 26, 2009	0785132600; 978-0785132608	2,237, ranked 31st first month	PAL

== See also ==
- 2009 in comics
