= The Punisher War Zone (1992 series) =

1992 comic book series

- Cover by John Romita Jr. and Klaus R. Janson. Romita's signature can be seen beneath the logo.

Publication information
- Publisher: Marvel Comics
- Schedule: Monthly
- Format: Ongoing series
- Genre: Crime, spy, war
- Publication date: 1992
- No. of issues: 41 + 2 annuals
- Main character: Punisher

Creative team
- Created by: Chuck Dixon; John Romita Jr.
- Written by: Chuck Dixon (1-11, 25-37, 41, Annual #1-2), Steven Grant (38-40, Annual #1-2)
- Artist(s): John Romita Jr. John Buscema; Joe Kubert
- Penciller(s): John Romita Jr. John Buscema; Joe Kubert
- Inker(s): Klaus R. Janson; Art Nichols; Thomas "Tom" Palmer Sr. Joe Kubert
- Letterer: James R. 'Jim' Novak
- Colorist(s): Gregory A. Wright; Kevin M. Tinsley - Stick/Stickman; Joe Rosas
- Editor(s): Don Daley; Tim Tuohy; Justin F. Gabrie - J.F. Gabrie; Alex Starbuck

The Punisher War Zone is a comic book series published by Marvel Comics about the vigilante The Punisher. The series was written and drawn by several artists during its run. The series lasted for 41 issues. It was the first series of The Punisher War Zone title history and lasted from 1992 to 1995. The vast majority of the series was written by Chuck Dixon. Besides John Romita Jr. who worked a lot on the series, several other artists painted the covers, among them Rainier "Rain" Beredo, John Buscema and Joe Kubert.

== Plot ==
The series was split up in different story arcs which tended to last several issues. The first story arc was Psychoville U.S.A. which lasted from issue 12 to 16, the next was The Jericho Syndrome beginning with issue 17 and ending in 19, third was Suicide Run from 23 to 25, after that was Conan with a Gun starting from 26 and lasting to issue 30, later was River of Blood picking up from issue 31 and concluding at 36, next to last was the Dark Judgment arc lasting from issue 38 to 40. The final arc was Countdown which took place in all three ongoing Punisher series at the time, The Punisher, War Journal and War Zone.

== Reception ==
The series was popular upon its original release. The launching of the series, which was the Punisher's third simultaneously ongoing series at the time, marked the peak of the character's exploitation and popularity at the time.

== Content ==
In the beginning of the series publication Marvel still adhered to the comic code and even with the main character, Frank Castle, killing a criminal in the first issue no details or effects of the shooting is portrayed. This is in stark contrast to later Punisher series such as those by Garth Ennis. Despite this and other Punisher series remained controversial and rejected in some circuits. Upon the release of the hugely popular issue of Alpha Flight in which the character Northstar came out as gay the New York Magazine reported that a store in Bleecker Street in New York City resorted to making customers who wanted to buy a copy of it purchase an issue of the series The Punisher War Zone as well to combat hoarding of the comic.

== Prints ==
=== Issues ===
No.	Title	Cover date	Comic Book Roundup rating	Estimated Styx sales (first month)
#1	Only The Dead Know Brooklyn	March 1992		
#2	Blood In The Water	April 1992		
#3	The Frame	May 1992		
#4	Closer To The Flame	June 1992		
#5	Feeding Frenzy	July 1992		
#6	The Carrion Eaters	August 1992		
#7	Muggers's Picnic	September 1992		
#8	The Hunting Ground	October 1992		Ranked 22nd in North America
#9	Goners	November 1992		Ranked 26th in North America
#10	Tight Spot	December 1992		Ranked 28th in North America
#11	In A Deadly Place	January 1993		
#12	Psychoville U.S.A., part 1: Family Ties	February 1993		Ranked 28th in North America
#13	Psychoville U.S.A., part 2: Happy Days	March 1993		Ranked 35th in North America
#14	Psychoville U.S.A., part 3: My Two Dads	April 1993		Ranked 39th in North America
#15	Psychoville U.S.A., part 4: Father Knows Best	May 1993		Ranked 42nd in North America
#16	Psychoville U.S.A., part 5: Empty Nest	June 1993		Ranked 57th in North America
#17	The Jericho Syndrome, part 1	July 1993		Ranked 64th in North America
#18	The Jericho Syndrome, part 2	August 1993		Ranked 69th in North America
#19	The Jericho Syndrome, part 3	September 1993		Ranked 61st in North America
#20	Numbah One Boom Boom	October 1993		Ranked 74th in North America
#21	2 Mean 2 Die!	November 1993		Ranked 70th in North America
#22	Taking Tiger Mountain	December 1993		Ranked 70th in North America
#23	Pt. 2: Bringing Down the House	January 1994		Ranked 65th in North America
#24	Pt. 5: SHHH!	February 1994		Ranked 67th in North America
#25	Pt. 8: Last Dance in Laastekist	March 1994		
#26	Conan With A Gun, part 1: Pirates	April 1994		
#27	Conan With A Gun, part 2: Boss Sugar	May 1994		
#28	Conan With A Gun, part 3: Sweet Revenge	June 1994		
#29	Conan With A Gun, part 4: The Swine	July 1994		
#30	Conan With A Gun, part 5: Ring Of Fire	August 1994		
#31	Part 1: Scorched Earth	September 1994		
#32	Part 2: Comrades	October 1994		
#33	Part 3: Capital Crimes	November 1994		
#34	Part 4: Dead Men's Eyes	December 1994		
#35	Part 5: Open Wounds	January 1995		
#36	Part 6: Children of the Gun	February 1995		
#37	Something Like Love	March 1995		
#38	Dark Judgment, part 1	April 1995		
#39	Dark Judgment, part 2	May 1995		
#40	Dark Judgment, The Conclusion	June 1995		
#41	Countdown: 2: Dead And Deader	July 1995		

=== Annuals ===
Title [Tagline]	Between	Pages	Cover date	Release date	Comic Book Roundup rating	Estimated sales (first month)	Rated
The Punisher War Zone (1992) - Annual 01: [High $take$]	—N/a	64	1993	—N/a	—N/a	—N/a	—N/a
The Punisher War Zone (1992) - Annual 02: [From Out of the Icey Grave... ...Thorn!]	—N/a	64	1994	—N/a	—N/a	—N/a	—N/a

=== Collected editions ===
Title [Tagline]	Format	Material collected	Pages	Publication date	ISBN	Estimated sales (first month)	Rated
The Punisher: War Zone vol. 1	Trade paperback	The Punisher War Zone #1-6	144	July 2002	0-7851-0923-4	1,894, ranked 39 in North America	PSR
The Punisher: River of Blood	TPB	The Punisher War Zone #31-36	144	November 30, 2005	0-7851-1542-0	1,820, ranked 61 North America	T+
The Punisher: Barbarian with a Gun	TPB	The Punisher War Zone #26-30	120	November 12, 2008	978-0-7851-3428-2	1,735, ranked 66 in North America	T+

== See also ==
- 1992 in comics
- Punisher: War Zone
