= Punisher: War Zone (2012 series) =

2012 Marvel Comics limited series

- Issue 1 cover by Marco Checchetto

Publication information
- Publisher: Marvel Comics
- Schedule: Monthly
- Format: Limited series
- Publication date: 2012
- No. of issues: 5
- Main character: Punisher

Creative team
- Created by: Greg Rucka
- Written by: Greg Rucka
- Artist(s): Carmine Di Giandomenico; Matthew 'Matt' Hollingsworth
- Penciller: Carmine Di Giandomenico
- Inker: Carmine Di Giandomenico
- Letterer: Joe Caramagna
- Colorist: Matthew 'Matt' Hollingsworth
- Editor(s): Axel Alonso; Cory Levine; Ellie Pyle; Nelson Ribeiro; Alex Starbuck; Stephen Wacker

Punisher: War Zone, also known as The Punisher War Zone, is a comic book series published by Marvel Comics about the vigilante The Punisher. The series was written by Greg Rucka as a follow-up to his previous Punisher series from 2011, meant to finish the story Rucka had begun in the 2011 series. The interior illustration was done by Carmine Di Giandomenico.

== Plot ==
During the series, Frank Castle (The Punisher) finds himself attacked by several members of the Avengers, who are all trying to stop his lethal personal war against crime, especially after he is accused of killing several police officers. Wolverine attempts to speak with him and believes Castle when he says he did not murder the policemen and lets Castle go.

Afterwards, Castle finds out that his supposed accomplice, Rachel Cole, will most likely be executed for the crime they have been accused of and he must save her. He fights with Natasha Romanoff (Black Widow) and Thor and manages to steal one of Iron Man's armors to give Cole enough time to escape. After he's beaten down by several Avengers, Castle is made to surrender by Steve Rogers (Captain America) who urges him to stand down like the military man he is after the battle is over and he knows he is beaten. Castle, unwilling to refuse an order from Rogers, whom he respects, gives up and is placed in prison.

== Reception ==
The series holds an average rating of 7.7 by 64 professional critics on the review aggregation website Comic Book Roundup.

Joey Esposito of IGN stated of the first issue that it is the kick-off to the perfect kind of event story, that it plays off what came before it but does not rely on it. He also expressed that even if one has not read Greg Rucka's previous Punisher story yet one can jump on War Zone and be up to speed on the very first page. He expressed that Rucka displays true storytelling mastery in the series, using five nearly-silent panels to give the reader the essential information to get them off and running.

== Prints ==
=== Issues ===
| No. | Title | Cover date | Comic Book Roundup rating | Estimated sales (first month) | Rated |
|---|---|---|---|---|---|
| #1 | Punisher Manhunt Continues | December 2012 | 8.1 by nineteen professional critics. | 27,010, ranked 98th in North America | PAL |
| #2 | Punisher Accomplice Refuses Not-Guilty Plea | February 2013 | 7.0 by seven professional critics. | 25,471, ranked 86th in North America | PAL |
| #3 | "Punisher Proxy" Trial Ends, Now to Jury | March 2013 | 7.9 by nine professional critics. | 23,863, ranked 85th in North America | PAL |
| #4 | Guilty! | March 2013 | 7.2 by fifteen professional critics. | 22,993, ranked 90th in North America | PAL |
| #5 | Escape! | April 2013 | 8.4 by fourteen professional critics. | 22,824, ranked 92nd in North America | PAL |

=== Collected editions ===
| Title | Format | Material collected | Pages | Publication date | ISBN | Estimated sales (North America) [Trades] | Rated |
|---|---|---|---|---|---|---|---|
| Punisher: Enter The War Zone | Trade Paperback | Punisher: War Zone (2012) #1-5 | 120 | May 29, 2013 | 978-0-7851-6742-6 | 2,100, ranked 44th the first month | —N/a |

== See also ==
- 2012 in comics
