= The Punisher War Journal =

Comic book series

- Punisher War Journal vol. 2, #5 (May 2007); Cover art by Ariel Olivetti.

Publication information
- Publisher: Marvel Comics
- Schedule: Monthly
- Format: Ongoing
- Publication date: vol. 1 November 1988 – July 1995 vol. 2 January 2007 – January 2009
- No. of issues: vol. 1; 80 vol. 2; 26 + 1 Annual
- Main character: Punisher

Creative team
- Written by: Carl Potts; Mike Baron; Chuck Dixon (38–42, 44–64, 75–80), Steven Grant (50, 65-75), Matt Fraction; Rick Remender
- Artist(s): Jim Lee; Mark Texeira; Gary Kwapisz; Ariel Olivetti; Cory Walker; Scott Wegener; Howard Chaykin
- Penciller(s): Carl Potts; Tod Smith; Ron Wagner; John Hebert; Hugh Haynes; Melvin Rubi

The Punisher War Journal, or Punisher War Journal, is the title of two Marvel Comics comic book series featuring the character Frank Castle, also known as the Punisher. The first volume, published from 1988 to 1995, was spun off of a self-titled series featuring the vigilante's exploits.

After this, the character went through a number of incarnations in Marvel's imprints, such as Marvel Knights and MAX. The second volume of War Journal, published between 2007 and 2009 by writer Matt Fraction, placed the character firmly in the ongoing Marvel Universe inhabited by superheroes such as the Avengers and Spider-Man, and super-villains such as Doctor Doom and the Masters of Evil. This was reflected in the series by tying into crossover events of the Marvel Universe proper, including "Civil War", "World War Hulk", and "Secret Invasion".

== Publication history ==
=== Volume 1 ===
The first volume of The Punisher War Journal ran 80 issues, cover-dated November 1988 to July 1995. Originally written and penciled by Carl Potts, and inked by Jim Lee, who soon became series penciler, it changed creative teams with issue #25 (December 1990) to writer Mike Baron and penciler-inker Mark Texeira. Chuck Dixon took over as writer with #38 (January 1992), continuing with it to the final issue, except for #65-74 (April 1994 – January 1995) which were written by Steven Grant. Others associated with the title include multi-issue pencilers Tod Smith, Ron Wagner, John Hebert, Hugh Haynes, Melvin Rubi, and penciler-inker Gary Kwapisz.

=== Volume 2 ===
The series was relaunched the following decade, titled simply Punisher War Journal, beginning with a new #1 (January 2007). The initial creative team was writer Matt Fraction and artist Ariel Olivetti, with subsequent artists including Cory Walker, Scott Wegener, and Howard Chaykin. Later, writer Rick Remender joined as a co-writer until the title was canceled to make room for a new ongoing volume of Punisher that would be exclusively written by Remender.

The series had one annual, named If I Die Before I Wake released in January 2009 Simon Spurrier and drawn by Antonio Fuso and Lee Loughridge.

== Collected editions ==
=== The Punisher Epic Collections ===
- Punisher Epic Collection Vol. 3 - Kingpin Rules (collecting "Punisher" Vol. 3 (1987) #11-25, "Annual" #1-2, 2019, 496 Pages, ISBN 9781302916411
- Punisher Epic Collection Vol. 4 Return To Big Nothing (collects "Punisher" (1987) #26-34, "Punisher Annual" (1988) #3, "Classic Punisher" (1989) #1, "Epic Graphic Novel: Punisher - Return to Big Nothing" (1989), "Marvel Graphic Novel: Punisher - Intruder" (1989), "Punisher: Kingdom Gone" (1990), July 21, 2021 ISBN 978-1-302-93085-1 TPB

=== The Punisher War Journal ===
- Punisher: An Eye For An Eye (Vol. 1 series, collects "The Punisher War Journal" #1-3), January 1992, ISBN 0871357771 (TPB)
- The Punisher/Wolverine: African Saga (Vol. 1 series, collects "The Punisher War Journal" #6-7), April 1992, ISBN 0871356112 (TPB)
- The Punisher War Journal Classic, Vol. 1 (Vol. 1 series, collects The Punisher War Journal #1-8), August 2008, ISBN 978-0-7851-3118-2 (TPB)
- The Punisher War Journal by Carl Potts and Jim Lee (Vol. 1 series, collects The Punisher War Journal #1-19) September 2016

=== Punisher War Journal ===
- Punisher War Journal, Vol. 1: Civil War (collects Punisher War Journal vol. 2, #1-4), April 2007, ISBN 978-0-7851-2775-8 (HC), August 2007, ISBN 978-0-7851-2315-6 (TPB)
- Punisher War Journal, Vol. 2: Goin' Out West (collects Punisher War Journal vol. 2, #5-11), December 2007, ISBN 978-0-7851-2852-6 (HC), March 2008, ISBN 978-0-7851-2636-2 (TPB)
- Punisher War Journal, Vol. 3: Hunter Hunted (collects Punisher War Journal vol. 2, #12-17), April 2008, ISBN 978-0-7851-3021-5 (HC), July 2008, ISBN 978-0-7851-2664-5 (TPB)
- Punisher War Journal, Vol. 4: Jigsaw (collects Punisher War Journal vol. 2, #18-23), December 2008, ISBN 978-0-7851-3022-2 (HC), April 2009, ISBN 978-0-7851-2964-6 (TPB)
- Punisher War Journal, Vol. 5: Secret Invasion (collects Punisher War Journal vol. 2, #24-26, Annual #1), February 2009, ISBN 978-0-7851-3148-9 (HC), May 2009, ISBN 978-0-7851-3170-0 (TPB)
- Punisher War Journal The Complete Collection by Matt Fraction, Vol. 1 (collects Punisher War Journal vol. 2, #1-12), January 2019, ISBN 978-1-302-91642-8 (TPB)

== In popular culture ==
The book is referenced in Mallrats when Brody tells Renee that Issue #6 is one of the three items (along with his copy of Fletch and the remote control to his VCR) he left at her house.

== See also ==
- List of The Punisher comics
