= Batman: The Knight =

Limited comic book series by Chip Zdarsky and Carmine Di Giandomenico

- Cover of Batman: The Knight #1 (January 2022), art by Carmine Di Giandomenico.

Publication information
- Publisher: DC Comics
- Schedule: Monthly
- Format: Limited series
- Genre: Neo-noir; Superhero
- Publication date: January – October 2022
- No. of issues: 10
- Main character(s): Batman; Alfred Pennyworth

Creative team
- Written by: Chip Zdarsky
- Artist: Carmine Di Giandomenico
- Letterer: Pat Brosseau
- Colorist: Ivan Plascencia

Batman: The Knight is an American comic book published by the publishing company DC Comics. The 10-issue limited series, written by Chip Zdarsky and illustrated by Carmine Di Giandomenico, began publication on January 18, 2022.

== Publication ==
Batman: The Knight was written by Chip Zdarsky and illustrated by Carmine Di Giandomenico, with colors by Ivan Plascencia and lettering by Pat Brosseau. The ten issues of Batman: The Knight were released by DC Comics at monthly intervals, with the first being published on January 18, 2022. The limited series was released to critical acclaim, with critics praising Chip Zdarsky's story, artwork, and action.

== Plot ==
Bruce Wayne meets up with Hugo Strange to talk about his troubled past where Bruce would fight off bullies that would pick on his classmates. Bruce's butler, Alfred Pennyworth, is annoyed by this and forces Bruce to read books to study in order to control his anger and rage from his parents' death. While talking to his girlfriend Dana, Bruce reveals he wants to be a cop, but Dana laughs and tells Bruce that the only reason why he wants to be a cop is because of vengeance. As time goes by, Bruce does not attend his classes because he does not see them as important anymore, and has been participating in underground fighting clubs. Bruce is arrested and Alfred bails him out while belittling him on his path of vengeance. Bruce finishes his therapy session while also noticing Strange has been trying to hypnotize him to steal money and calls the cops to arrest him while declaring that he will leave Gotham City to find his own path.

Four weeks later, Bruce Wayne is in Paris trying to find a teacher that can teach him stealth without telling Alfred as well as finding a serial killer. He meets a female burglar name Lucie "The Gray Shadow" Chesson, who agrees to teach him after admiring his dedication and wanting Bruce to capture all of her competition in the future. After a few weeks, Lucie tells Bruce they will steal from Chateau Merchand to steal a $4 million jewelry box from Hubert Glonet, the CEO of Sunrise Oil. While escaping, Bruce is shot in the leg, but Lucie helps him escape. While tending to his wounds, detective and manhunter Henri Ducard arrives and holds Bruce and Lucie at gunpoint.

Ducard decides to let Bruce and Lucie go after revealing Alfred hired him to find Bruce and Lucie and has brokered a truce with Ducard. Ducard realizes that Bruce and Lucie stole the jewelry box from Glonet, who is the serial killer. Ducard explains that Glonet is part of The Foundling, serial killers targeting wealthy families. Ducard decides to draw Glonet out, but in the ensuing chaos due to Bruce exposing them, Ducard is shot. Bruce manages to figure out Glonet's final target, but arrives too late to save him. Hubert tries killing Bruce, but Bruce overpowers Hubert and nearly beats him to death. Lucie stops him and fires him, but not before parting on good terms. Bruce calls Alfred, saying he regrets their last conversation but he will not come back until he finds his own path.

Bruce then goes to Paektu Mountain in North Korea to ask for training from martial arts expert Master Kirigi. Bruce bonds with a young man named Anton and they start training for months. Bruce becomes suspicious after Kirigi takes in new students without any previous tests. While talking with Anton, Anton tells Bruce that he wants to stop crime for fun and that it is harder than committing crimes. Bruce decides to leave Kirigi's training after he plans to teach the students a technique that will kill people in one hit, as well as the new students being assassin's apprentices. Bruce is ambushed by Kirigi's new apprentices (whom Anton told that Bruce was leaving) before being saved by Anton, and both of them begin traveling elsewhere.

Bruce and Anton are arrested after they were caught staking an FSB office in Moscow trying to find Avery Oblonsky, an ex-KGB spy turned freelance agent, and are imprisoned for 13 days. Their jail cells are suddenly unlocked one night, and it is revealed that Oblonsky was the jail warden who imprisoned them as well as Alexi Yahonotov, a Department Chief in the FSB. Bruce and Anton explains to Oblonsky that they wanted to find her to understand the art of espionage and disguise. After some training, Avery tells Bruce and Anton to free two American teenagers from Metropolis who were arrested for possessing four grams of marijuana. Bruce nearly fails the task, but Anton completes the assignment by bribing the police. For their next assignment, Avery has them retrieve a book that has Russian safe houses from the US Embassy. Bruce nearly fails the mission, but Anton gets the book and gives it to Avery.

After completing their training, Oblonsky sends Bruce and Anton to be trained by Luka Jungo, the world's greatest marksman. However, when they met him, Jungo explained he left the Swiss Army because he was forced to kill his target's family, and starts to train Bruce and Anton. One day, Luka is enraged that Anton shot a deer in the neck while hunting which caused it to die in pain, and plans to kill Anton. Bruce disarms Anton with a shot to the wrist, but Anton shoots Luka in the head, killing him. Bruce and Anton fight, with Anton defeating Bruce but deciding to spare him.

Bruce then travels to New York City where he gets training from John Zatara on escapology. Zatara wants his daughter Zatanna, one of Bruce's oldest friends, to follow in his footsteps, but Zatanna does not like how her father is an alcoholic. While walking with Bruce, they find a corpse that has red markings, and see that Zatara was talking to Shantoz, a demon that escapes from Hell every 20 years and feeds on the souls of the brokenhearted. Bruce asks Zatara to teach him magic when he learns of its existence so he can stop the killings, but Zatara declines; instead, Bruce asks Zatanna to help him. Bruce and Zatanna manage to lure Shantoz in a trap, and Zatara sends him back to Hell.

While training in Rio de Janeiro, Mexico, and Shanghai, Bruce realizes that Anton has been sabotaging him during missions to make sure Bruce knows he is one step ahead of him. Bruce meets up with a new teacher named Dr Daniel Captio, the world's smartest man and an expert mentalist, to control his fear and emotions. Bruce fails to control his emotions and plans to leave Daniel when Daniel shows Bruce a picture of Alfred and Dana shot in the head, enraging Bruce. Anton then appears wounded on Daniel's front door, telling Bruce he was not the one sabotaging him during missions but a swordsman and assassin named Harris "The Still" Zuma. Bruce defeats Zuma but spares him, and in return Zuma reveals he was the teacher of the Master Kirigi's new apprentices and tells Bruce that a man named Ra's al Ghul is waiting for Anton and Bruce. Bruce comes back and confronts Daniel, realizing that he manipulated the picture of Alfred and Dana to see if Bruce can focus his emotion at a goal which works. Bruce knocks out Daniel, and both Bruce and Anton go to the Crystal Hills of Abu Dhabi to meet up with Ra's.

While traveling, Bruce and Anton's jeep are sabotaged and they walk on foot to meet Ra's. After arriving, Ra's explains that he's trying to save the world as well, and agrees to train them in the art of healing wounds. Bruce is suspicious of Ra's, as, even though he is saying he is saving the world, he is also training assassins. While sparring with Ra's, Bruce is easily defeated and wounded. Bruce survives by slowing his heart rate and using Bialyan graveolens to disinfect and enhance regeneration. Ra's daughter, Talia al Ghul, makes advances on Bruce, but Bruce rejects her and she leaves coldly. Ra's then calls Bruce and Anton to a meeting, saying that he has assassins to protect himself, as well as him reaching out for Anton and Bruce to replace Zuma after he had failed him, and tells Bruce and Anton they will have to fight for the death.

Bruce defeats Anton, whose real name is later revealed to be Minhkhoa Khan, and becomes Ra's right-hand man, newly christening him as the "Demon's Heart", and Bruce and Talia later kiss. After a sparring session, Ra's explains that, in order to bring peace in the world, there needs to use violence to force people to be peaceful, which is why he has missiles which will attack innocent cities. Bruce reveals that Anton found out about the missiles, and secretly told Bruce about them during their earlier fight, leading Bruce to blow them up. Bruce defeats Ra's in combat, but is stabbed in the back by Talia, who takes Ra's. Anton, who was cast out of Ra's presence along with Zuma, later comes back and saves Bruce and leaves him out in the desert. With his training completed, Bruce returns to Gotham City and reconciles with Alfred and learns that Dana is engaged to a firefighter and works at LexCorp. Bruce finally descends into a cave filled with bats.

== Issues ==
Title	Issue	Publication date	Ref.
Batman: The Knight	#1	January 18, 2022	
Batman: The Knight	#2	February 15, 2022	
Batman: The Knight	#3	March 15, 2022	
Batman: The Knight	#4	April 19, 2022	
Batman: The Knight	#5	May 17, 2022	
Batman: The Knight	#6	June 21, 2022	
Batman: The Knight	#7	July 19, 2022	
Batman: The Knight	#8	August 16, 2022	
Batman: The Knight	#9	September 20, 2022	
Batman: The Knight	#10	October 18, 2022	

== Reception ==
Reviewing the first issue of Batman: The Knight, Sayantan Gayen of Comic Book Resources commented that "Bruce Wayne follows a path of self-discovery, reconciliation, and vengeance. While it seems like DC Comics is currently running a plethora of Batman titles and crossovers across the board, Batman: The Knight #1 looks to bring more color and dimension to Gotham's wealthiest kid". At the end of his analysis, Gayen wrote: "Chip Zdarsky uses the debut issue of Batman: The Knight to propel Bruce Wayne on a lengthy trial to strengthen his mind, soul, and body".

According to Comicbookroundup, the series received an average rating of 8.6 out of 10 based on 99 reviews.
