= Punisher (2009 series) =

2009 Marvel Comics comic book series

- Variant cover art to Punisher (2009 series), #1. Art by Mike McKone. A tribute to the cover of The Amazing Spider-Man #129

Publication information
- Publisher: Marvel Comics
- Schedule: Monthly
- Format: Ongoing series
- Genre: Superhero
- Publication date: March 2009 – November 2010
- No. of issues: 21; 1 Annual; 1 "Dark Reign" one-shot
- Main character: Frank Castle/Punisher

Creative team
- Created by: Rick Remender; Jerome Opena
- Written by: Rick Remender
- Artist(s): Jerome Opena; Tan Eng Huat; Tony Moore; Roland Boschi; John Romita, Jr. (List one-shot)

Punisher, retitled Franken-Castle from issue #17 on, is a Marvel Comics comic book series featuring the character Frank Castle, also known as the Punisher. Spinning out of the second Punisher War Journal series by writer Matt Fraction, this series of Punisher places the character firmly in the ongoing Marvel Universe inhabited by superheroes such as the Avengers and Spider-Man, and super-villains such as Doctor Doom and the Masters of Evil. For the majority of issues released, the series had tied into the ongoing events of Marvel's line-wide "Dark Reign" storyline, opening with Castle attempting to assassinate Norman Osborn.

After the events of "Dark Reign", Castle was dismembered and killed by Wolverine's son, Daken, and reassembled as a Frankenstein monster by Morbius and the Legion of Monsters.

== Publication history ==
The story continued in Punisher: In the Blood.

== Story arcs ==
=== "Living in Darkness" (#1–5) ===
After Norman Osborn positions himself as "humanity's savior" following the "Secret Invasion", he becomes the foremost national security officer in the country and disbands S.H.I.E.L.D., placing a new organization, H.A.M.M.E.R., in its place. Holding Osborn accountable for his actions as the supervillain Green Goblin, the Punisher plans to assassinate Osborn. Joining forces with a new, tech-savvy young partner, Castle sets about taking Osborn down. Castle, normally favoring simple ends to his targets, must adapt his methods to Osborn's far-reaching influence and deep-seated corruption. Castle and his new associate Henry Russo elect to gather evidence of the former Green Goblin's wrongdoing in order to completely destroy his newfound reputation and end his Dark Reign once and for all. Osborn, on the other hand, has an associate waiting in the wings to get rid of the Punisher.

=== "Dead End" (#6–10, Annual #1) ===
The Hood's crime organization grows at an alarming rate, eluding the authorities of New York City, most of the superhero population, and Norman Osborn and H.A.M.M.E.R. The Punisher positions himself as the only thing resembling consequence and makes it a personal mission to bring Hood and his organization down. Although, Hood is ready for him in the form of the "Deadly Dozen," a highly trained team ready to move in on Castle and eliminate him. And in the monthly's first Annual, Punisher moves in on criminals of New York City before being confronted by a dangerously strong and agile hypnotized foe: Spider-Man.

=== Dark Reign: The List – Punisher #1 ===
Going down his list of enemies to eliminate before ascending to, what he deems, "control of the world," Norman Osborn arrives at the man who made his list after attempting to assassinate him: Frank Castle. Devoting the entirety of H.A.M.M.E.R.'s resources to the elimination of the Punisher, Osborn is surprised at the vigilante's resourcefulness in evading H.A.M.M.E.R. ground forces. To remedy this, he dispatches Daken, the Avengers' dark reflection of Wolverine, to eliminate Castle once and for all. Finding him in a New York City sewer, a fight to the death ensues between the Dark Wolverine and the Punisher. The Punisher does well, and manages to fight on par with Daken, but the mutant's healing factor proved too much for Castle, and Daken eventually cut both his arms off before decapitating him.

=== "Dead and Alive" (#11–16) ===
Morbius and the Legion of Monsters reconstruct Frank as a Frankenstein monster. Morbius "re-composed" Castle, hoping his military experience, tactical mindset and leadership would help the Legion of Monsters overcome a society that has been hunting them down. However, Frank rejected the group upon waking up and left their base. He stayed in the tunnels, unaware the Legion was being slaughtered by the Japanese society. A creature who previously offered Frank food fled to him for help, but died at his doorstep. Frank joins in the fight to protect the innocent 'monstrous' entities being targeted by their enemies.

=== "Missing Pieces" (#17–21) ===
The series was retitled Franken-Castle starting here.

After being revived, Frank must find a way to live with his new limitations and make peace with what he has become. To do this, he hits the streets once again to punish the guilty, and begins to formulate a plan of vengeance against the man who killed him.

Daken, later seen at a nightclub, is attacked by the now monstrous Punisher, who is seeking revenge. After a brutal fight Daken is defeated but decides to hunt Franken-Castle to continue the fight and retrieve the Bloodstone integrated into Fraken-Castle's new physical form. After following Franken-Castle's trail, Daken encounters a series of devastating traps before meeting his foe again. After a second brutal hand-to-hand battle, Daken is severely injured and retreats. Franken-Castle finds him and, after damaging Daken even more, is about to throw him into a mass of concrete foundation (presumably to kill him). However, Franken-Castle is stabbed in the chest from behind, by Wolverine, who states he is intervening in his plans to kill his son.

Franken-Castle knocks Wolverine unconscious; however, Daken manages to slip away. Franken-Castle tries to avoid him, but Daken crashes into the vehicle and moves Franken-Castle's gem into his chest becoming invulnerable and attacks again. Wolverine and Franken-Castle are forced to work together to combat Daken because the effects of the Bloodgem on Daken's healing factor are disastrous. During their battle on the rooftop, Franken-Castle finally takes down the insane Daken. After Daken was defeated, Wolverine removes the gems from his son and gives it to Franken-Castle and the scene ends with Wolverine alone on a rooftop.

After his fight with Daken, Punisher returns to Monster Island and the Bloodstone seems to have returned him to normal but he starts growing insane and the monster within the Bloodgem is starting to take control of him. The Legion of Monsters decide to take him down and retrieve the Bloodstone from him with the help of Elsa Bloodstone. Though Manphibian attempts to talk some sense into the Punisher, Elsa decides to just shoot him and take the stone from him. This angers Punisher and he fights and defeats Elsa in a jungle but before he could finish her off Werewolf by Night intervened and saved Elsa. Then the Living Mummy convinces Frank to give up the gem and walk away.

== Prints ==
=== Issues ===
The first 16 issues were simply titled Punisher.

No.	Title	Cover date	Comic Book Roundup rating	Estimated sales (first month)
#1	Living in Darkness	March 2009	7.2 by four professional critics.	43,863, ranked 33rd in North America
#2	Living in Darkness Part 2	April 2009	7.9 by five professional critics.	36,519, ranked 39th in North America
#3	Living in Darkness Part 3	May 2009	7.4 by four professional critics.	37,564, ranked 39th in North America
#4	Living in Darkness Part 4	June 2009	7.6 by three professional critics.	36,992, ranked 57th in North America
#5	Living in Darkness Part 5	July 2009	8.1 by four professional critics.	35,621, ranked 44th in North America
#6	Dead End	August 2009	8.0 by two professional critics.	32,969, ranked 59th in North America
#7	Dead End: Chapter 2	September 2009	6.8 by two professional critics.	31,206, ranked 62nd in North America
#8	Dead End: Chapter 3	October 2009	6.0 by three professional critics.	33,022, ranked 65th in North America
#9	Dead End: Chapter 4	November 2009	6.0 by one professional critic.	28,400, ranked 89th in North America
#10	Dead End: Chapter 5	December 2009	8.2 by two professional critics.	27,151, ranked 74th in North America
#11	FrankenCastle: Chapter 1	January 2010	8.5 by six professional critics.	24,978, ranked 83rd in North America
#12	FrankenCastle: Chapter 2	February 2010	7.3 by four professional critics.	24,985, ranked 84th in North America
#13	FrankenCastle: Chapter 3	March 2010	9.0 by three professional critics.	23,734, ranked 83rd in North America
#14	FrankenCastle: Chapter 4	April 2010	9.8 by two professional critics.	23,455, ranked 78th in North America
#15	FrankenCastle: Chapter 5	May 2010	8.2 by four professional critics.	22,286, ranked 93rd in North America
#16	Franken-Castle (Conclusion)	June, 2010	8.5 by two professional critics.	23,047, ranked 84th in North America

As of issue 17 the series was officially retitled Franken-Castle.

No.	Title	Cover date	Comic Book Roundup rating	Estimated sales (first month)
#17	Missing Pieces	August 2010	8.2 by five professional critics.	22,378, ranked 92nd in North America
#18		August 2010	5.3 by three professional critics.	19,605, ranked 105th in North America
#19		September 2010	7.6 by four professional critics.	24,947, ranked 83rd in North America
#20		November 2010	4.0 by one professional critic.	24,304, ranked 80th in North America
#21		November 2010	7.6 by five professional critics.	20,036, ranked 105th in North America

=== Annuals ===
Title	Between	Pages	Cover date	Release date	Comic Book Roundup rating	Estimated sales (first month)	Rated
"Remote Control"	Issue 9 and 10	40	November 2009	September 30, 2009	5.7 by three professional critics.	25,528, ranked 97th in North America	PAL

=== One-shots ===
Name	Tie-in to	Pages	Variants	Publication dates	UPC	Comic Book Roundup rating	Estimated sales (first month)
Dark Reign: The List - Punisher - #1 "A Good Lie"	Dark Reign	48	Original Second printing Hero Variant Marvel Unlimited	October 28, 2009 October 28, 2009 October 28, 2009 March 1, 2011	UPC 5960606915-00111	8.5 by six critics.	36,769, ranked 52nd in NA

=== Collected editions ===
Title [Tagline]	Format	Material collected	Pages	Publication date	ISBN	Estimated sales (North America)	Rated
Punisher, Vol. 1: Dark Reign	Trade paperback Hardcover HC	Punisher (2009) #1–5	136	November 18, 2009	978-0-7851-4069-6 978-0-7851-3997-3		
Punisher, Vol. 2: Dead End	Trade paperback Hardcover HC	Punisher (2009) #6–10; Punisher Annual #1	168	December 16, 2009	978-0-7851-4162-4 978-0-7851-4278-2		
Punisher, Vol. 3: Franken-Castle	Trade paperback Hardcover HC	Dark Reign: The List - Punisher; Punisher (2009) #11-16; Franken-Castle #17-21; Dark Wolverine #88-89	344	April 27, 2011	978-0-7851-4420-5 978-0-7851-4754-1		PAL

Title [Tagline]	Format	Material collected	Pages	Publication date	ISBN UPC	Estimated sales (North America)	Rated
Punisher: Franken-Castle — The Birth of the Monster		Dark Reign: The List - Punisher; Punisher (2009) #11	48	June 3, 2010	UPC 5960607305-00111		
The List	HC	Dark Reign: The List - Amazing Spider-Man (2010) #1; Dark Reign: The List - Avengers (2009) #1; Dark Reign: The List - Daredevil (2009) #1; Dark Reign: The List - Hulk (2009) #1; Dark Reign: The List - Punisher (2009) #1; Dark Reign: The List - Secret Warriors (2009) #1; Dark Reign: The List - Wolverine (2009) #1; Dark Reign: The List - X-Men (2009) #1	232	January 6, 2010	978-0-7851-4236-2; UPC 5960614236-00111		
The List	TPB	Dark Reign: The List - Amazing Spider-Man (2010) #1; Dark Reign: The List - Avengers (2009) #1; Dark Reign: The List - Daredevil (2009) #1; Dark Reign: The List - Hulk (2009) #1; Dark Reign: The List - Punisher (2009) #1; Dark Reign: The List - Secret Warriors (2009) #1; Dark Reign: The List - Wolverine (2009) #1; Dark Reign: The List - X-Men (2009) #1	232	June 30, 2010	978-0-7851-4806-7; UPC 5960614806-00111		PAL

Title [Tagline]	Format	Material collected	Pages	Publication date	ISBN	Estimated sales (North America)	Rated
Punisher by Rick Remender Omnibus	Hardcover	Dark Reign: The List - Punisher #1; Dark Wolverine 88-89; Punisher/Franken-Castle 1-21; Punisher (2009) Annual 01; Punisher: In The Blood 1-5	768	July 18, 2012	0785162135; 978-0785162131		PAL

== Reception ==
The first 16 issues holds an average rating of 7.8 by 51 professional critics on the review aggregation website Comic Book Roundup. After the series was renamed it holds an average rating of 6.5 by 18 professional critics.
