= Crystal Hill =

Crystal Hill may refer to:

== Populated places ==
- Crystal Hill, Saskatchewan, Canada
- Crystal Hill, Arkansas, United States
- Crystal Hill, Virginia, United States

== Natural features ==
- Crystal Hill, a hill on the Cugnot Ice Piedmont in Antarctica
- Crystal Hills, a mountain range in California, United States
