= Punisher War Journal (2006 series) =

American comic book series

- Cover to issue # by Alex Maleev.

Publication information
- Publisher: Marvel Comics
- Schedule: Monthly
- Format: Ongoing series
- Publication date: 2006
- No. of issues: 26 + 1 annual
- Main character: Punisher

Creative team
- Created by: Matt Fraction
- Written by: Matt Fraction; Rick Remender; Simon Spurrier
- Artist(s): Mike Deodato Jr. Ariel Olivetti; Howard V. Chaykin; Cory Walker; Scott Wegener; Clint Langley (covers)
- Penciller(s): Mike Deodato Jr. Ariel Olivetti; Howard V. Chaykin; Cory Walker; Scott Wegener; Werther Dell'edera
- Inker(s): Mike Deodato Jr. Ariel Olivetti; Howard V. Chaykin; Cory Walker; Scott Wegener
- Letterer(s): Joe Caramagna; Rus Wooton
- Colorist(s): Rainier 'Rain' Beredo; Dean V. White; Jesus Aburto; Shannon Blanchard; Edgar Delgado - 'Pato'; Ariel Olivetti; Dave Stewart
- Editor(s): Axel Alonso; Michael O'Connor; Warren Simons; Aubrey Sitterson; John Denning; Jennifer Grünwald; Daniel Ketchum; Cory Levine; Alex Starbuck

Punisher War Journal or The Punisher War Journal is an American comic book series published from 2006 to 2009 by Marvel Comics featuring the character Frank Castle, also known as the vigilante the Punisher. It is the second series under the title The Punisher War Journal. Unlike the main Punisher series (which was published under Marvel's MAX imprint and was set in a more realistic world) at the time of its publishing the events of this edition of War Journal take place in the main Marvel Universe, Earth-616. The series was mainly written by Matt Fraction and drawn by Howard Chaykin.

The series takes place over the late stages of the Civil War storyline and its following arc The Death of Captain America, following Frank Castle and focuses on his relationship with Steve Rogers, (Captain America), whom he deeply admires despite their fundamental differences and his method of dealing with his death. Following Rogers's assassination at the hands of Crossbones and Doctor Faustus (through a hypnotized Sharon Carter), Castle decides to honor him by killing a white supremacist tarnishing his name using a modified version of Rogers' uniform, while Punisher dons a new uniform of his own with the same inspiration. The series spawned a spin-off named Punisher in 2009.

== Plot ==
The series consisted of several story-arcs, "How I Won The War" spanning issues 1–3, "The Initiative" spanning issues 6–11, "Hunter/Hunted" spanning issues 13–15, "Jigsaw" for issue 18—23 and "Secret Invasion" lasting from issue 24 to 25. Several short stories between the main storylines are also featured for some issues.

== Reception ==
=== Critical response ===
The series holds an average rating of 7.3 by sixty-one professional critics on the review aggregation website Comic Book Roundup. The series was one of the most acclaimed new series of 2007.

Timothy Callahan of Comic Book Resources expressed about the series that the author, Matt Fraction, has alternated between writing a clever, witty looks at the Marvel Universe and serious and severe looks at the screwed-up world in which Frank Castle lives. He also stated that while the tone was not exactly consistent from arc to arc, he did not see that as a drawback at all, because the Punisher in his most general form is not a character that works for interesting in the long term in his opinion. "The Punisher is an inconsistent character, really, if you take into account all of his in-Universe portrayals over the years. He's been a buffoonish killer, a monster, a hero, a lunatic, a patriot, and almost anything you can imagine. Fraction has written him as a strange combination of all of those things, and if he isn't heroic in a traditional sense, at least he has a code he follows. He's a psychopath headlining a book set in the Marvel Universe, and Fraction has made him compelling and somewhat noble, while never going so far as to make Frank Castle admirable." Callahan also praised Chaykin's art.

== Prints ==
=== Issues ===
No.	Title	Cover date	Comic Book Roundup rating	Estimated sales (first month)
#1	How I Won the War, Part 1: Bring On the Bad Guys	January 2007	6.9 by six professional critics.	102,720, ranked 9th in North America
#2	How I Won the War, Part 2: Dead Soldiers	February 2007	7.2 by three professional critics.	87,966, ranked 14th in North America
#3	How I Won the War, Part 3: Mutually Assured Destruction	March 2007	6.2 by three professional critics.	70,139, ranked 21st in North America
#4	Small Wake For a Tall Man	April 2007	7.5 by two professional critics.	52,951, ranked 35th in North America
#5	NYC Red	May 2007	7.8 by two professional critics.	50,187, ranked 45th in North America
#6	Goin' Out West	June 2007	7.8 by two professional critics.	53,443, ranked 45th in North America
#7	Blood and Sand	July 2007	5.8 by two professional critics.	72,848, ranked 27th in North America
#8	Sunset	August 2007	6.2 by two professional critics.	61,338, ranked 32nd in North America
#9	Duel	September 2007	6.8 by three professional critics.	56,834, ranked 40th in North America
#10	Sunset	October 2007	5.5 by two professional critics.	51,300, ranked 47th in North America
#11	Heroes and Villains	November 2007	7.5 by two professional critics.	47,205, ranked 43rd in North America
#12	World War Frank	December 2007	6.9 by three professional critics.	66,478, ranked 21st in North America
#13	Hunter/Hunted, Part 1	January 2008	9.4 by three professional critics.	41,768, ranked 55th in North America
#14	Hunter/Hunted, Part 2	February 2008	9.6 by two professional critics.	38,447, ranked 63rd in North America
#15	Hunter/Hunted, Part 3	March 2008	8.6 by one professional critic.	35,627, ranked 56th in North America
#16	The Survivors Guild	April 2008	8.6 by one professional critic.	32,488, ranked 56th in North America
#17	How I Survived The Good Ol' Days	May 2008	6.8 by two professional critics.	31,217, ranked 61st in North America
#18	Jigsaw, Part 1 of 6	June 2008	6.9 by two professional critics.	29,559, ranked 74th in North America
#19	Jigsaw, Part 2 of 6	July 2008	6.8 by one professional critic.	29,898, ranked 75th in North America
#20	Jigsaw, Part 3 of 6	August 2008	7.4 by two professional critics.	27,277, ranked 80th in North America
#21	Jigsaw, Part 4 of 6	September 2008	6.4 by three professional critics.	26,293, ranked 97th in North America
#22	Jigsaw, Part 5 of 6	October 2008	7.3 by two professional critics.	25,542, ranked 99th in North America
#23	Jigsaw, Part 6 of 6	November 2008	7.7 by one professional critic.	27,376, ranked 87th in North America
#24	Secret Invasion: Part 1 of 2	December 2008	6.3 by four professional critics.	31,781, ranked 79th in North America
#25	Secret Invasion: Part 2 of 2	January 2009	6.6 by three professional critics.	29,976, ranked 63rd in North America
#26		February 2009	8.2 by two professional critics.	22,420, ranked 121st in North America

=== Annuals ===
Title	Between	Pages	Cover date	Release date	Comic Book Roundup rating	Estimated sales (first month)	Rated
"If I Die Before I Wake"	Issue 25 and 26	48	January 2009	November 2008	7.4, by three professional critics.	20,713, ranked 103rd in North America	T+

=== Collected editions ===
Title	Format	Material collected	Pages	Publication date	ISBN UPC	Rated
Punisher War Journal: Civil War	Hardcover	Punisher War Journal (2007) #1-4	144	April 25, 2007	0785123156; 978-0785123156	T+ (Note: Teen and up)
Punisher War Journal: Goin' Out West	HC	Punisher War Journal (2007) #5-9	168	December 5, 2007	978-0-7851-2852-6	T+
Punisher War Journal: Hunter/Hunted	HC	Punisher War Journal (2007) #12-17	161	April 16, 2008	UPC 5960613021-00111	T+
Punisher War Journal: Jigsaw	HC	Punisher War Journal (2007) #18-23	144	December 17, 2008	978-0-7851-3022-2; UPC 5960613022-00111	PAL (Note: Parental Advisory)
Punisher War Journal: Secret Invasion	HC	Punisher War Journal (2007) #24-26 and annual #1 (2007)	120	February 18, 2009	978-0-7851-3148-9; UPC 5960613148-00111	PAL
Punisher War Journal: Civil War	Trade Paperback	Punisher War Journal (2007) #1-4	144	September 6, 2007	0785123156; 978-0785123156	T+
Punisher War Journal: Goin' Out West	TPB	Punisher War Journal (2007) #5-9	168	March 19, 2008	0785126368; 978-0785126362	T+
Punisher War Journal: Hunter/Hunted	TPB	Punisher War Journal (2007) #12-17	161	July 16, 2008	978-0-7851-2664-5; UPC 5960612664-00111	PAL
Punisher War Journal: Jigsaw	TPB	Punisher War Journal (2007) #18-23	144	March 18, 2009	0785129642; 978-0785129646	PAL
Punisher War Journal: Secret Invasion	TPB	Punisher War Journal (2007) #24-26 and annual #1 (2007)	120	May 20, 2009	978-0-7851-3408-4; UPC 5960613408-00111	PAL

== See also ==
- 2006 in comics
- 2007 in comics
- 2008 in comics
- 2009 in comics
