= ODY-C =

Comic book series

- Cover of the ODY-C Cycle One hardcover collected edition.

Publication information
- Publisher: Image Comics
- Format: Ongoing series
- Genre: Science fiction
- Publication date: November 2014 to present
- No. of issues: 12 (24 planned)

Creative team
- Written by: Matt Fraction
- Artist: Christian Ward

Collected editions
- SC Vol 1 (#1–5): ISBN 978-1632153760
- SC Vol 2 (#6–10): ISBN 978-1632156037
- HC Vol 1 (#1-12): ISBN 978-1632159274

ODY-C is an American comic book series created by writer Matt Fraction and artist Christian Ward. The series is a science fictional and gender-bent re-imagination of Homer's Odyssey. The first issue was published in November 2014 by the American company Image Comics. It depicts the journeys of three warrior queens, Odyssia, Gamen, and Ene, as they return from their century-long siege on the city Troiia-VII. ODY-C has been described as a "masterfully psychedelic, gender-bending, space-operatic retelling of Homer’s Odyssey."

The first issue of ODY-C was published on November 26, 2014.

== Development ==
Matt Fraction became aware of Christian Ward's work as a graphic designer and reached out to him to illustrate a comic. Fraction conceived of ODY-C with Ward in mind to be "the greatest Christian Ward comic that Could Ever Be." ODY-C is Ward's second comic after his last book, Infinite Vacation.

Fatherhood has influenced his work—especially the plot of Odyssia returning to her son. Fraction wanted to rewrite the Odyssey for his daughter as a story about a mother trying to get back home to her daughter, but realized it would be far too inappropriate for a four-year-old. The diverse body types, races, and sexualities are partly because of Fraction wanting to write characters his daughter could look up to, but they also function to ground the fanciful story in humanity. While doing research for the book, Fraction was most influenced by Odysseus in America by Jonathan Shay, Margaret Atwood's The Penelopiad, and Herodotus's The Histories. Other influences on the development of the comic include Barbarella, Jodorowsky, Heavy Metal comics, Cirque du Soleil, burlesque, and fetish. Most of the comic is written in dactylic hexameter like the original, but two issues are written entirely in limerick.

=== Publication history ===
ODY-C is planned to mirror the Odyssey: it will have 24 issues, one for each of the Odyssey's 24 chapters.

A hardcover edition of ODY-C collecting issues #1-12 was released on November 23, 2016. It includes the ten-page fold out present in the comic's first issue, essays by the classicist Dani Colman, and teaching aids.

ODY-C Cycle Two will pick up in late 2017 and will mirror the structure of the first cycle: five issues following Odyssia, five following He and Ene, and two issues following the fall of the house of Atreus.

=== Art ===
Chris Ward's illustrations tell the story of the Odyssey by way of 1970s European science fiction. He notes that European science fiction at that time was more organic and existential than American hard sci-fi, which was more focused on possible future technologies. He employs much underwater imagery as a reference to the literal sea that Odysseus sailed on, and he also frequently uses circles and rounded shapes to invoke femininity. The main characters' space ships are based on female reproductive organs, as opposed to the commonly phallic rocket. Whenever the gods enter the narration, the already psychedelic art becomes even more so, as a symbol of the gods' influence on the lives of the characters. The colorful representation of the gods was influenced by Hindu iconography. The main character Odyssia is purposefully illustrated as someone with indeterminate race in order to be more relatable to all readers, but Matt Fraction insisted that she must have a muscular build befitting the warrior that she is.

=== Gender in ODY-C ===
ODY-C was originally conceived as a direct binary gender-swapped version of the Odyssey that would take the archetype of a male hero and explore how making him a woman would change the feel of the story, but their take on gender soon became more complicated. Fraction wanted to deconstruct traditionally male-centric stories by not simply switching one gender for another, but "killing all men and really exploding things and showing how different literature looks when you invert traditional gender politics." Fraction and Ward agree that the original Odyssey has some seriously flawed gender politics; for example, male suitors waiting around to have sex with Penelope to gain her land and money. ODY-C explores how archetypes like Leia Organa's metal bikini would look in a gender-swapped world in the form of He's fetish gear-inspired outfit, which looks very different but reduces him to a symbol of sexual availability and fertility all the same.

Some men (Aeolus, Herakles) and women retain their original gender in ODY-C, but the most significant change to the original concept was the introduction of a third gender, Sebex. In the world of ODY-C, Zeus kills all men in order to eliminate any potential challengers, and instead of stealing fire from Olympus, Prometheus steals a future for humanity by creating a third gender, Sebex: brightly-skinned feminine people who have the ability to be impregnated by a woman's egg.

He, the equivalent of Helen, is the first man born in ten thousand years, due to the interference of the gods, and a handful more follow, forming much of the conflict of the books. The gods themselves also display diverse gender expressions, from the bearded Athena and Hera to the "mother-father" Zeus.

== Synopsis ==
ODY-C tells the story of the Odyssey, the Oresteia, and parts of the One Thousand and One Nights. It follows the main points of the Odyssey, but Fraction attempted to make the story more relatable and human than the poetic original. Christian Ward describes the story both as a psychedelic retelling of the Odyssey set in a burlesque universe and the story of a mother travelling home to her family.

The story follows Odyssia, Gamen, and Ene (mirrors of Odysseus, Agamemnon, and Menelaus respectively), warrior queens of Achaea after their sack of the city Troiia-VII. Achaea went to war with Troiia-VII over He, the first man born in ten thousand years. After, the three women go their own way.

The first five issues follow Odyssia, a trickster and a mother who longs to go home to her Sebex wife and young son but is caught up again and again in strife. ODY-C represents Odyssia as both a victim of PTSD and somebody who isn't satisfied with a peaceful, quiet life.

Issues #6-10 follow Ene and He as they are tossed by a storm to the planet of Q'af, a land frozen in time and ruled by the two sons of Herakles. Ene is captured by Proteus, who prevents anybody from leaving the world, and He befriends a young boy. He and the boy are chosen to be the twin kings' brides for a night before they are to be beheaded, as has happened every night since the kings killed their spouses for having a secret affair. He delays the slaughter by telling the kings stories every night, in the hope that Ene will return and save them. This arc has a recurring theme of sexual assault and the revenge and justice that follows.

Issues #11 and #12 follows Gamem's return home and retells the Fall of the House of Atreus. Gamem's wife, Menstra, plots to murder her for killing their daughter and take her place on the throne.

== Reception ==
While ongoing, the series has attracted favorable reviews and attention, including from IGN, USA Today, and Wired. The first volume was on the Otherwise Award honor list for 2015 and Ward's art for the first volume earned him a nomination for the British Comic Awards Emerging Talent.

At the review aggregator website Comic Book Roundup, the series received an average score of 8.5 out of 10 based on 82 reviews.
