= Satellite Sam =

Comic book series

- Cover of Satellite Sam #1

Publication information
- Publisher: Image Comics
- Schedule: Monthly
- Format: Ongoing series
- Publication date: July 2013
- No. of issues: 15

Creative team
- Created by: Matt Fraction and Howard Chaykin
- Written by: Matt Fraction
- Artist: Howard Chaykin

Satellite Sam is a creator-owned American comic book series by Matt Fraction and American artist Howard Chaykin distributed by Image Comics starting in July 2013.

== Plot ==
Carlyle White, a children's television show presenter in the 1950s, is found dead with a box of photographs of scantily clad women in provocative positions. His son believes the box of photographs is the key to solving his father's murder. The story follows Carlyle's son, a recovering alcoholic, as he steps into his father's shoes as the television character Satellite Sam, deals with his addictions, and wrangles producers, writers, and journalists during the nascent days of television.

== Collected editions ==
Title	Material collected	Publication date	ISBN
Satellite Sam Vol. 1	Satellite Sam #1-5	March 2014	9781607068525
Satellite Sam Vol. 2: Satellite Sam and the Kinescope Snuff	Satellite Sam #6-10	October 2014	9781632151209
Satellite Sam Vol. 3: Satellite Sam and the Limestone Caves of Fire	Satellite Sam #11-15	August 2015	9781632154057
Satellite Sam Deluxe Edition	Satellite Sam #1-15	October 2015	9781632154781
