= Sex Criminals =

Comic book series by Matt Fraction and Chip Zdarsky

- Artwork for the cover of Sex Criminals #1; Art by Chip Zdarsky

Publication information
- Publisher: Image Comics
- Schedule: Monthly
- Format: Ongoing series
- Genre: Crime
- Publication date: September 2013 – October 28, 2020
- No. of issues: 31 (and 1 special)
- Main character(s): Suzie; Jon

Creative team
- Written by: Matt Fraction
- Artist: Chip Zdarsky
- Colorist: Becka Kinzie
- Editor: Thomas K

Collected editions
- One Weird Trick: ISBN 1-60706-946-6
- Two Worlds One Cop: ISBN 1-63215-193-6
- Three the Hard Way: ISBN 1-63215-542-7
- Fourgy!: ISBN 1-53430-231-X
- Five-Fingered Discount: ISBN 1-53430-683-8
- Six Criminals: ISBN 1-53431-062-2

Sex Criminals is a comic book series published by American company Image Comics. It is written by Matt Fraction and illustrated by Chip Zdarsky, set in the Image Universe. The first issue was published on September 25, 2013, and the last issue was published on October 28, 2020, running for 31 issues and one special over six volumes: One Weird Trick, Two Worlds One Cop, Three the Hard Way, Fourgy!, Five-Fingered Discount, and Six Criminals. Since publication, the series has continuously received critical acclaim.

Sex Criminals was nominated for two Eisner Awards in 2014 including Best Continuing Series and won Best New Series. In 2015, Matt Fraction made a deal with Universal Television to turn Sex Criminals into a television show, which ultimately entered development hell. A streaming series adaptation for Amazon Prime Video was announced in January 2026, with Imogen Poots and John Reynolds attached to star.

According to the American Library Association, the hardcover release Big Hard Sex Criminals was the seventh most banned and challenged book in the United States in 2016, due to being considered sexually explicit.

== Synopsis ==
Suzie, a librarian, and Jon, an actor, meet at a party and end up sleeping together. Later, they are shocked to discover that they share the ability to freeze time when they orgasm. As their relationship develops and their sexual histories are explored, they decide to rob the bank where Jon works in order to save Suzie's endangered library.

== Publication history ==
In March 2013, Image Comics announced a sex comedy during the Emerald City Comicon. Later reports confirmed that it was intended for mature readers and would have Matt Fraction and Chip Zdarsky in the forefront. Films like The 40-Year-Old Virgin, Bridesmaids, and Jackass: The Movie were mentioned as touchstones for the comics, and Fraction himself confirmed in an interview that the works of Billy Wilder also inspired him deeply in writing.

Fraction and Zdarsky had known each other for a short time before the book's creation. They communicated almost exclusively online and Zdarsky was the first to suggest a collaboration. Initially, Zdarsky wanted to write a book that was their take on fantasy, as they were fans of the genre. They felt it was underrepresented in comic books. Fraction responded with another idea, suggesting, "[W]hat if we do a sex comedy about a guy, who every time he ejaculates, stops time?" Zdarsky was tired from a business trip he was on and agreed to the idea without much thought. After continued communication, their idea began to grow until the book was published in September 2013. The book has gained a cult following and its fans refer to themselves as 'brimpers' after a sex position described in the first issue.

A special issue, referred to as the "Sexual Gary Special," was released in September 2020.

== Reception ==
Time honored Sex Criminals as the #1 comic series/graphic novel of 2013.

IGN tagged the work as "amazing", and said that the story is "so addictive, you'll find yourself staring at the last page in horror when you realize you'll have to wait another month to find out what happens next".

Paste called the first issue "splendid", with "an immediately likable character", specifying that although one "wouldn’t trust most comic creators to turn a sexual awakening into compelling pulp fiction (...) Fraction and Zdarsky pull it off masterfully."

The first compilation, Sex Criminals: One Weird Trick, was nominated for the 2015 Hugo Award for Best Graphic Story.

According to the American Library Association, the hardcover release Big Hard Sex Criminals was the seventh most banned and challenged book in the United States in 2016, due to being considered sexually explicit.

== Collected editions ==
=== Trade paperback releases ===
Title	Material collected	Publication date	ISBN	Diamond ID/Lunar Code
Sex Criminals, Vol. 1: One Weird Trick	Sex Criminals #1–5	April 2014	978-1607069461	JAN140558
Sex Criminals, Vol. 2: Two Worlds One Cop	Sex Criminals #6–10	February 2015	978-1632151933	OCT140654
Sex Criminals, Vol. 3: Three the Hard Way	Sex Criminals #11–15	June 2016	978-1632155429	OCT150608
Sex Criminals, Vol. 4: Fourgy!	Sex Criminals #16–20	September 2017	978-1534302310	JUL170876
Sex Criminals, Vol. 5: Five-Fingered Discount	Sex Criminals #21–25	August 2018	978-1534306837	JUN180239
Sex Criminals, Vol. 6: Six Criminals	Sex Criminals #26–30, #69	November 2020	978-1534310629	AUG200105
Sex Criminals: The Complete Edition	Sex Criminals #1–30, #69	March 2024	978-1534397484	0124IM225

=== Hardcover releases ===
Title	Material collected	Publication date	ISBN	Diamond ID
Big Hard Sex Criminals	Sex Criminals #1–10	March 2015	978-1632152435	NOV140582
Big Hard Sex Criminals, Vol. 2: Deluxxxe	Sex Criminals #11–20	January 2018	978-1534307063	NOV170713
Big Hard Sex Criminals, Vol. 3: Deluxxxe	Sex Criminals #21–30, #69	July 2021	978-1534319097	FEB210130

== Television adaptation ==
In January 2026, it was announced that Kumail Nanjiani, Emily V. Gordon, and Tze Chun were developing a live-action adaptation of the comic, produced by LuckyChap Entertainment and Winter Coat Films for Amazon Prime Video. Nanjiani, Gordon, Chun, Fraction, and Zdarsky serve as executive producers of the series. In May 2026, it was announced that Imogen Poots and John Reynolds would lead the cast. Poots and Reynolds are set to play Suze and Jon respectively, with Nanjiani also set to appear in a recurring role. Nia DaCosta are announced as the director of the first and the last two episodes of the series, along with serving as an executive producer. In June 2026, Pamela Adlon and Ayden Mayeri joined the main cast, while BD Wong and Ashleigh Cummings were cast in recurring roles. In July 2026, Joseph Lee and Sunita Mani were cast in recurring roles.

== See also ==
- Portrayal of women in American comics
- Erotic comics
