= Chip Zdarsky =

Canadian comic book artist

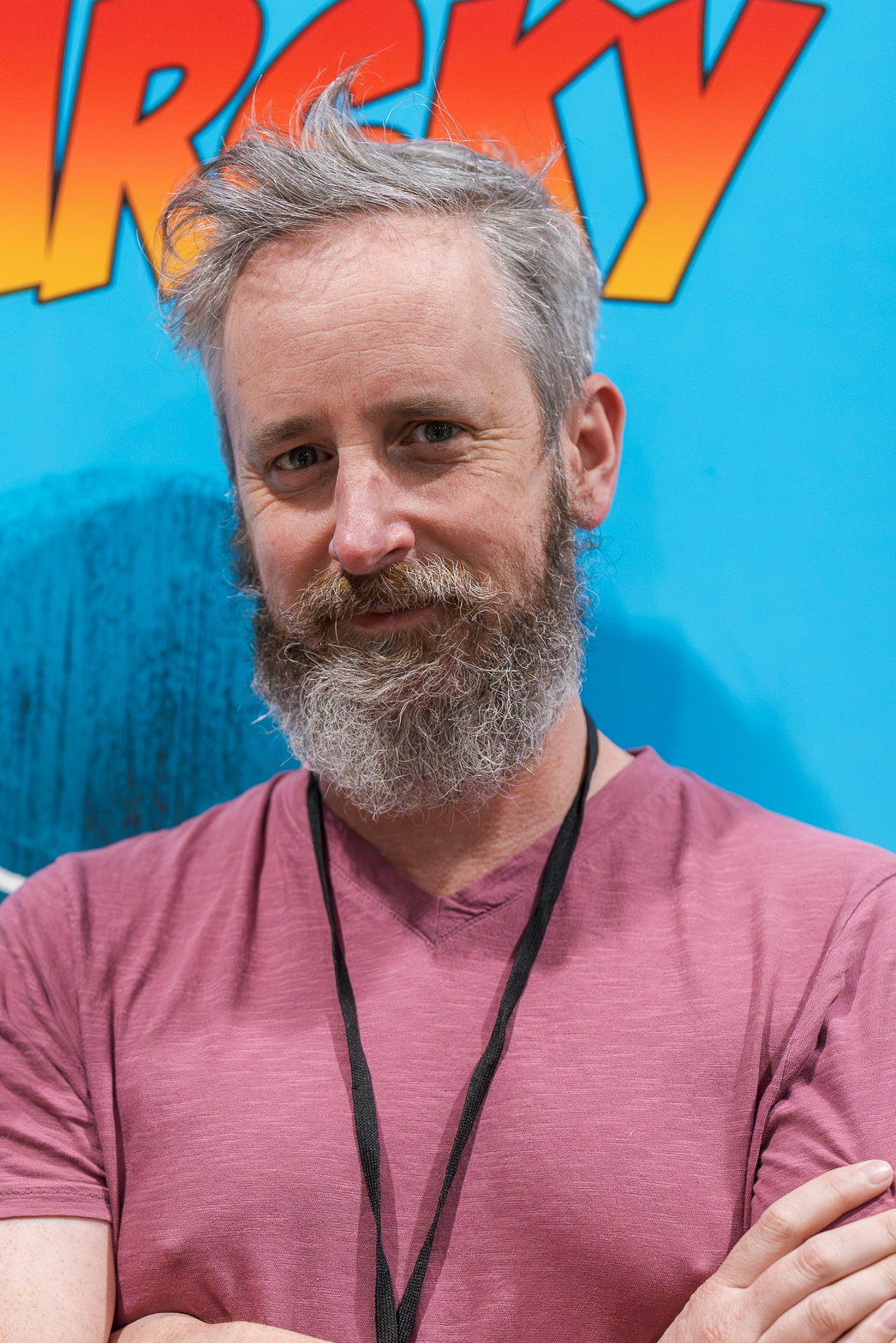
- Zdarsky at GalaxyCon Richmond in 2026
- Born: Steven Murray; December 21, 1975 (age 50) Edmonton, Alberta, Canada
- Area: Artist
- Notable works: Sex Criminals; Batman; Spider-Man: Life Story; Peter Parker, The Spectacular Spider-Man; Daredevil; Howard the Duck; Jughead
- Education: Sheridan College

Steven Murray (born December 21, 1975), known by the pen-name Chip Zdarsky (/zəˈdɑːrski/), is a Canadian comic book artist and writer, journalist, illustrator, and designer. Murray worked for National Post for over a decade, until 2014, as an illustrator and humorist, writing and illustrating the "Extremely Bad Advice" column as well as The Ampersand, the online edition of the newspaper's pop culture section.

He uses the Zdarsky pseudonym for comics-related work, including Prison Funnies, Monster Cops, and as artist and co-creator of Sex Criminals with writer Matt Fraction. He has written comics such as Howard the Duck, Peter Parker: The Spectacular Spider-Man, Daredevil, Spider-Man: Life Story, and Spider-Man: Spider's Shadow for Marvel Comics, Batman for DC Comics, and Jughead for Archie Comics.

He has also used the pseudonym Todd Diamond.

== Early life ==
Steve Murray was born in Edmonton, Alberta and raised in Barrie, Ontario. He attended Sheridan College for illustration, graduating in 1996.

== Career ==
Murray has illustrated for such clients as The Globe and Mail, New York magazine, CBC and Canadian Business.

In 2000, Murray created Chip Zdarsky as a pseudonym and alter ego for his persona as a comic book writer and illustrator, developing his own independent projects, such as Prison Funnies and Monster Cops (which can be read online or in print) as well as collaborating on a variety of projects, including Dark Horse Comics titles Fierce and Rumble Royale. About his alter ego, Murray said "I wanted to have a sad-sack cartoonist persona that lives in his mom's basement, paints figurines for money, has restraining orders against him. And that became a character." He describes the character as "an idiot who doesn't know what I'm doing. I've had no success in my life. No matter what, I'm going to mess things up." Murray initially attempted to keep the identities separate and secret.

From 2008 to 2014, Murray penned and illustrated a weekly advice column for the National Post called "Extremely Bad Advice". He also wrote another column in that paper, Tear Jerk, in which he reviewed films to see if they could actually make him "weep like a baby".

Along with Kagan McLeod, Ben Shannon, and Cameron Stewart, he is a co-founder of the studio The Royal Academy of Illustration and Design, which produced Rumble Royale.

In 2010, he also launched a mock campaign for mayor of Toronto. He was not an officially registered candidate, launching his satirical "campaign" through social networking platforms after the deadline had passed to register as a candidate in the real campaign.

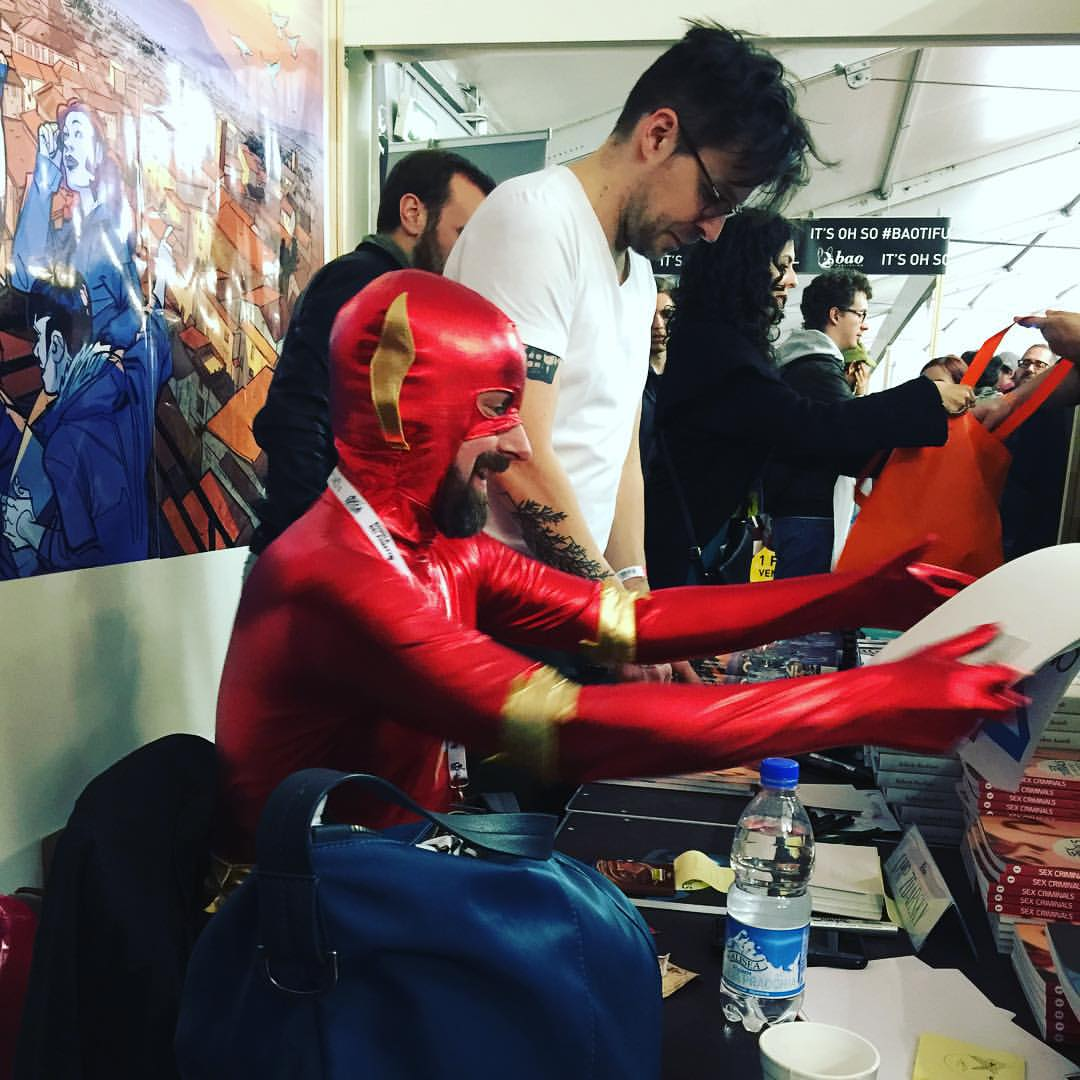
Chip Zdarsky (with Flash-costume) and Matt Fraction

In June 2013, Image Comics announced that Chip Zdarsky had teamed up with Invincible Iron Man and Hawkeye writer, Matt Fraction, on a new creator-owned series titled Sex Criminals. The first issue was released on September 23, 2013. Sex Criminals was declared number 1 on Time magazine's list of "Top 10 Comics and Graphic Novels" of 2013.

In 2014, Murray won a Will Eisner Award for Best New Series for Sex Criminals.

Zdarsky wrote the first series arc of the relaunched Jughead comic for the 2015 New Riverdale relaunch.

On February 15, 2017, it was announced that beginning that June, Zdarsky would be writing a brand new "back-to-basics" Spider-Man series Peter Parker: The Spectacular Spider-Man that would run alongside writer Dan Slott's run on The Amazing Spider-Man. Zdarsky later wrote the two Spider-Man miniseries Spider-Man: Life Story and Spider-Man: Spider's Shadow.

In November 2018, it was announced that Zdarsky would serve as the writer on Daredevil, with Marco Checchetto serving as artist. The series began publication in February 2019 and lasted until November 2021 with issue 36. This lead into the event Devil's Reign, also by Zdarsky and Checchetto. A new Daredevil #1 launched in July 2022, with Zdarsky and Checchetto returning from the previous volume. The series explored the fallout of Devil's Reign and the effect it had on both Matt and Elektra, as both were operating as Daredevil. August 2023 marked the end of his Daredevil.

In 2020, DC Comics announced that Zdarsky would be among the creators of a revived Batman: Black and White anthology series which debuted on December 8, 2020.

In 2021, it was announced that Zdarsky had signed a deal with Substack to develop exclusive comics for the service, such as Public Domain and volume two of Kaptara with Kagan McLeod.

In February 2022, it was announced that Zdarsky would serve as the new writer for the mainline Batman book, starting with issue 125 on July 5, with Jorge Jiménez serving as the artist. He concluded his run on February 5th, 2025 with the release of Batman #157 with Jiménez and Tony S. Daniel providing the art.

In March 2022, it was announced that Public Domain would be heading to print via Image Comics in June 2022.

In July 2024, Zdarsky announced that he would be releasing a monthly physical newsletter in comic shops called Zdarsky Comic News. The newsletter included content such as interviews, news on upcoming comic releases, games, humorous columns, and promos of his upcoming work. In the first month, Zdarsky released 50,000 copies of the newsletter to comic ships distributed through Diamond Comic Distributors.

In February 2025, it was announced that Zdarsky would be writing a new volume of Captain America for Marvel. The opening arc of the series follows Steve shortly after he is freed from the ice and tells the untold first encounter between him and Doctor Doom. Valerio Schiti serves as the main artist for the book. The first issue debuted in July 2025.

In June 2026, it was announced that Zdarsky would pen a new volume of Avengers illustrated by Marco Chechetto. The series, set after the events of Avengers: Armageddon, follows the new line-up of Spider-Man, Wolverine, Captain Marvel, Daredevil, Luke Cage, and David Colton/Miracleman with its first issue set to release in November 2026.

== Awards and nominations ==
=== Awards ===
- 2014 Eisner Award – Best New Series (Sex Criminals, with author Matt Fraction)
- 2014 Harvey Award – Most Promising New Talent
- 2014 Harvey Award – Best New Series (Sex Criminals)
- 2015 Harvey Award – Special Award For Humor (Sex Criminals; rejected by winner)
- 2016 Harvey Award – Special Award For Humor (Howard the Duck)
- 2017 Eisner Award – Best Humor Publication (Jughead, with Ryan North, Erica Henderson and Derek Charm)
- 2017 War Rocket Ajax Intercontinental Championship
- 2019 Eisner Award – Best Single Issue/One-Shot (Peter Parker: The Spectacular Spider-Man #310)
- 2019 Shuster Award – Best Writer (Peter Parker: The Spectacular Spider-Man, Marvel Two-in-One)
- 2020 Eisner Award – Best Digital Comic (Afterlift, with artist Jason Loo)
- 2021 GLAAD Media Award for Outstanding Comic Book — Empyre, Lords of Empyre: Emperor Hulkling / Empyre: Aftermath Avengers (with Al Ewing, Dan Slott and Anthony Oliveira)
- 2023 Eisner Award – Best New Series (Public Domain)
- 2025 Tripwire Award – Best Comic-Related Publication (Zdarsky Comic News)

=== Nominations ===
- 2014 Eisner Award nominee – Best Series (Sex Criminals, with author Matt Fraction)
- 2017 Eisner Award nominee – Best Publication for Teens (ages 13–17) (Jughead, with Ryan North, Erica Henderson and Derek Charm)
- 2019 Eisner Award nominee – Best Writer (Peter Parker: The Spectacular Spider-Man, Marvel Two-in-One)
- 2020 Eisner Award nominee – Best Writer (White Trees, Daredevil, Spider-Man: Life Story, Afterlift), Best Continuing Series (Daredevil with Marco Checchetto)
- 2021 Eisner Award nominee – Best Writer (Stillwater, Daredevil, Fantastic Four/X-Men)
- 2021 Eisner Award nominee – Best Continuing Series (Daredevil)
- 2021 Eisner Award nominee – Best Continuing Series (Stillwater)
- 2023 Eisner Award nominee – Best Continuing Series (Daredevil with Marco Checchetto and Rafael de Latorre)
- 2023 Eisner Award nominee – Best Writer (Stillwater, Daredevil)
- 2023 Harvey Award nominee – Book of the Year (Public Domain)
- 2025 Eisner Award nominee – Best Comics-Related Periodical/Journalism (Zdarsky Comic News)

== Bibliography ==
=== Archie Comics ===
- Jughead #1–8 (writer, October 2015 – August 2016)
  - Volume 1 (collects #1–6, with Erica Henderson, tpb, 168 pages, 2016, ISBN 978-1627388931)
  - #7–8 (with Derek Charm, 2016), collected in Volume 2 (tpb, 144 pages, 2017, ISBN 978-1682559987)

=== Comixology Originals ===
- Afterlift (writer, 5-issue limited series, with Jason Loo, April 2020; republished by Dark Horse in February 2021, tpb, 136 pages, ISBN 978-1506724409)
- The All-Nighter (writer, with Jason Loo, October 2021 – February 2024)
  - #1-5 (republished by Dark Horse in March 2022 as Season One, tpb, 136 pages, ISBN 978-1506728049)
  - #6-10 (republished by Dark Horse in December 2023 as Season Two, tpb, 120 pages, ISBN 9781506736488)
  - #11-15 (republished by Dark Horse in January 2025 as Season Three, tpb, 128 pages, ISBN 978-1506740713)

=== DC Comics ===
- Harley Quinn 25th Anniversary Special: "Bird Psychology" (writer, with Joe Quinones, November 2017)
- Harley Quinn story in Dark Nights: Death Metal Guidebook (writer, with Khary Randolph, October 2020) collected in Dark Nights: Death Metal: The Darkest Knight (tpb, 208 pages, 2020, ISBN 978-1779507921)
- Detective Comics #1027: "Many Happy Returns" (artist, with Matt Fraction, November 2020) collected as Batman: Detective Comics #1027 Deluxe Edition (hc, 184 pages, 2020, ISBN 978-1779506740)
- Red Hood: Cheer in Batman: Urban Legends #1–6 (writer, with Eddy Barrows, March 2021–August 2021) Collected as:
  - Batman: Urban Legends Vol 1 (collects #1-6, 264 pages, 2021, ISBN 978-1779512178)
- Batman: Black and White vol. 5 #4: "The Green Deal" (writer, with Nick Bradshaw, March 2021)
- Justice League: Last Ride #1–7 (writer, with Miguel Mendonça, May–November 2021) Collected as
  - Justice League: Last Ride (tpb, 154 pages, 2022, ISBN 978-1779514394)
- Batman: The Knight #1–10 (writer, with Carmine Di Giandomenico, January 2022–October 2022) collected as
  - Compendium Edition #1 (collects #1–3, 99 pages, 2022)
  - Batman: The Knight (hc, 318 pages, 2023, ISBN 978-1779518507, tpb, 318 pages, 2024)
- Batman vol. 3 #125–157 (writer, with Jorge Jimenez, Mike Hawthorne & Giuseppe Camuncoli, July 2022–February 2025) Collected as
  - Batman Vol 1. Failsafe (collects #125–130, HC, 176 pages, 2023, ISBN 978-1779519931)
  - Batman Vol 2. The Bat-Man of Gotham (collects #131-135, HC, 224 pages, 2023, ISBN 978-1779520425)
  - Batman/Catwoman: The Gotham War (collects Batman/Catwoman: The Gotham War: Battle Lines, Batman #137-138, Catwoman #57-58, and Batman/Catwoman: The Gotham War: Scorched Earth, co-writer, with Tini Howard and various, HC, 272 pages, 2024 ISBN 978-1779525987)
  - Batman Vol 3. Joker Year One (collects #139-144, HC, TP)
  - Batman Vol. 4: Dark Prisons (collects #145-152, HC, TP)
  - Batman Vol. 5: The Dying City (collects #153-157 and the lead story from Batman #150, HC, TP)
- Harley Quinn: Black + White + Redder #1: "The Man of Steal!" (writer, with Kevin Maguire, September 2023)
- The Penguin #0 (reprints backup stories from Batman #125-127, writer, with Belén Ortega, October 2023)
- Titans: Beast World Tour: Gotham: "The Good Boy" (writer, one-shot with Miguel Mendonça, December 2023)

=== Image Comics ===
- Sex Criminals (artist, with Matt Fraction, September 2013 – October 2020)
  - Volume 1: One Weird Trick (collects #1–5, tpb, 128 pages, 2014, ISBN 978-1607069461)
  - Volume 2: Two Worlds, One Cop (collects #6–10, tpb, 128 pages, 2015 ISBN 978-1632151933)
  - Volume 3: Three the Hard Way (collects #11–15, tpb, 132 pages, 2016 ISBN 978-1632155429)
  - Volume 4: Fourgy! (collects #16–20 tpb, 136 pages, 2017 ISBN ISBN 978-1534302310)
  - Volume 5: Five-Fingered Discount (collects #21–25, tpb, 128 pages, 2018 ISBN 978-1534306837)
  - Volume 6: Six Criminals (collects #26–30, 69, tpb, 152 pages, 2020 ISBN 978-1534310629)
  - Big Hard Sex Criminals (collects #1–10, hc, 256 pages, 2015 ISBN 978-1632152435)
  - Big Hard Sex Criminals Volume 2 Deluxxxe (collects #11–20, hc, 256 pages, 2018 ISBN 978-1534307063)
  - Big Hard Sex Criminals Volume 3 Deluxxxe (collects #21–30, 69, hc, 272 pages, 2021 ISBN 978-1534319097)
  - Sex Criminals: The Complete Edition (collects #1-30, 69, hc, 824 pages, 2024 ISBN 978-1534397484)
- Sex Criminals: Just the Tips (artist, with Matt Fraction, December 2014)
- Kaptara (writer, with Kagan McLeod, April–November 2015) continued online
  - Volume 1: Fear Not, Tiny Alien (collects #1–5, tpb, 128 pages, 2015, ISBN 978-1632155573)
- The White Trees #1–2 (writer, limited series, with Kris Anka, August–September 2019)
- Stillwater #1–18 (writer, with Ramón K. Pérez, September 2020–December 2022)
  - Volume 1: Rage, Rage (collects #1–6, tpb, 136 pages, 2021 ISBN 978-1534318373)
  - Volume 2: Allways Loyal (collects #7–12, tpb, 128 pages, 2022, ISBN 978-1534320048)
  - Volume 3: Border Crossing (collects #13 - 18, tpb, 168 pages, 2023 ISBN 978-1534323513)
- The Silver Coin #1 (writer, with Michael Walsh, April 2021) collected in The Silver Coin, Volume 1 (tpb, 144 pages, 2021, ISBN 978-1534319929)
- Crossover #7 (writer, with Phil Hester, June 2021) collected in Crossover Vol. 2: The Ten Cent Plague (tpb, 176 pages, 2022, ISBN 978-1534319288)
- Newburn #1–16 (writer, with Jacob Phillips, November 2021–March 2024)
  - Volume 1 (collects #1–8, tpb, 160 pages, 2022 ISBN 978-1534322394)
  - Volume 2 (collects #9–16, tpb, 176 pages, 2024 ISBN 978-1534397187)
- Public Domain #1–current (writer/artist, reprint of online series, June 2022–)
  - Volume 1 (collects #1–5, tpb, 160 pages, 2023 ISBN 978-1534322394)
  - Volume 2 (collects #6-10, tpb, 120 pages, 2025 ISBN 978-1534353770)
- Kaptara: Universal Truths #1–6 (writer, limited series, reprint of online series, with Kagan McLeod, August 2023–January 2024)
  - Volume 2: Universal Truths (collects #1–6, tpb, 168 pages, 2024 ISBN 978-1534397910)
- The Domain #1-5 (writer, limited series, with Rachel Stott, July 2024-November 2024) collected in The Domain (tpb, 112 pages, 2025, ISBN 978-1534364165)

=== Marvel Comics ===
- Original Sins #5: The No-Sin Situation (writer/artist, October 2014) collected in:
  - Original Sins (tpb, 144 pages, 2015, ISBN 978-0785191513)
- Howard the Duck:
  - Howard the Duck vol. 5 (writer, with Joe Quinones, May–October 2015) collected in:
    - Howard the Duck by Zdarsky & Quinones Omnibus (hc, 464 pages, 2022, ISBN 978-1302932015)
      - Volume 0: What the Duck? (collects #1–5, tpb, 112 pages, 2015, ISBN 978-0785197720)
  - Howard the Duck vol. 6 (writer, with Joe Quinones January–December 2016) collected in:
    - Howard the Duck by Zdarsky & Quinones Omnibus (hc, 464 pages, 2022, ISBN 978-1302932015)
      - Volume 1: Duck Hunt (collects #1–6, The Unbeatable Squirrel Girl #6, tpb, 160 pages, 2016, ISBN 978-0785199380)
      - Volume 2: Good Night, and Good Duck (collects #7–11, tpb, 112 pages, 2016, ISBN 978-0785199397)
- All-New, All-Different Avengers Annual #1: "The Once and Future Marvel" (artist, with Mark Waid, August 2016) collected in:
  - All-New, All-Different Avengers Vol. 3: Civil War II (tpb, 112 pages, 2017, ISBN 978-1302902360)
- Civil War II: Choosing Sides #5: "Alpha Flight" (writer, with Ramón K. Pérez, October 2016) collected in:
  - Civil War II: Choosing Sides (tpb,152 pages, 2016, ISBN 978-1302902513)
- Doctor Strange vol. 4 #1.MU (writer, with Julian Lopez, April 2017) collected in:
  - Monsters Unleashed: Battleground (tpb, 264 pages, 2017, ISBN 978-1302907198)
- Star-Lord vol. 2 #1–6, Annual #1 (writer, with Kris Anka, February–July 2017) collected as:
  - Star-Lord: Grounded (tpb, 168 pages, 2017, ISBN 978-1302905545)
- Spider-Man:
  - Peter Parker: The Spectacular Spider-Man vol. 2 (August 2017 – February 2019) Collected in:
    - Spider-Man by Chip Zdarsky Omnibus (hc, 936 pages, 2023, ISBN 978-1302952983)
      - Volume 1: Into The Twilight (collects #1–6, FCBD 2017 Secret Empire, writer, tpb, with Adam Kubert and Michael Walsh, 144 pages, ISBN 978-1302907563)
      - Volume 2: Most Wanted (collects #297–300, writer/artist, tpb, with Adam Kubert and Juan Frigeri, 112 pages, ISBN 978-1302907570)
      - Volume 3: Amazing Fantasy (collects #301–303, Annual #1, writer, tpb, with Joe Quinones, 112 pages, ISBN 978-1302911188)
      - Volume 4: Coming Home (collects #304–310, writer/artist, tpb, with Adam Kubert, 112 pages, ISBN 978-1302911195)
  - Spider-Man: Life Story (writer, 7-issue limited series, with Mark Bagley, May 2019 – August 2021) collected as
    - Spider-Man: Life Story (tpb, 208 pages, 2019, ISBN 978-1302917333)
    - Spider-Man: Life Story (hc, 240 pages, 2021, ISBN 978-1302931919)
    - Spider-Man by Chip Zdarsky Omnibus (hc, 936 pages, 2023, ISBN 978-1302952983)
  - Spider-Man: Spider's Shadow (writer, 5-issue limited series, with Pasqual Ferry, April–August 2021) collected in
    - Spider-Man: Spider's Shadow (tpb, 128 pages, 2021, ISBN 978-1302920913)
    - Spider-Man by Chip Zdarsky Omnibus (hc, 936 pages, 2023, ISBN 978-1302952983)
  - Amazing Spider-Man: Full Circle (co-writer, one-shot, with Rachel Stott and various, December 2019) collected as
    - Amazing Spider-Man: Full Circle (hc, 128 pages, 2020, ISBN 978-1302921385)
- Not Brand Echh #14: "The Not Next Issue Page" (writer/artist, January 2018) collected in
  - Not Brand Echh: The Complete Collection (tpb, 480 pages, 2019, ISBN 978-1302918828)
- Unbeatable Squirrel Girl vol. 2 #26: "A Bird in the Hand" (artist, with Erica Henderson, January 2018) collected in
  - The Unbeatable Squirrel Girl, Volume 7: I've Been Waiting For a Squirrel Like You (tpb, 128 pages, 2018, ISBN 978-1302906658)
  - The Unbeatable Squirrel Girl Vol. 4 (hc, 272 pages, 2019, ISBN 978-1302915445)
- Marvel 2-in-One vol. 2 (writer, February 2018 – January 2019) collected in Fantastic Four: Fate of the Four (hc, 2021)
  - Volume 1: Fate of the Four (collects #1–6, tpb, with Jim Cheung and Valerio Schiti, 136 pages, 2018, ISBN 978-1302910921)
  - Volume 2: Next of Kin (collects #7–12, Annual #1, tpb, with Declan Shalvey and Ramón K. Pérez, 160 pages, 2019, ISBN 978-1302914912)
- Doctor Strange vol. 1 #390 (co-artist, with Donny Cates and Frazer Irving, July 2018) collected in
  - Doctor Strange by Donny Cates Vol. 2: City Of Sin (tpb, 112 pages, 2018, ISBN 978-1302910655)
  - Doctor Strange by Donny Cates (hc, 360 pages, 2019, ISBN 978-1302915292)
- Merry X-Men Holiday Special: "The Gift That Keeps On Giving" (writer/artist, one-shot, February 2019)
- Namor: The Best Defense #1 (writer, one-shot with Carlos Magno, February 2019) collected in
  - Defenders: The Best Defense (tpb, 168 pages, 2019, ISBN 978-1302916145)
- Invaders vol. 3 (writer, with Carlos Magno and Butch Guice, March 2019 – February 2020) collected as Always an Invader (hc, 304 pages, 2021, ISBN 978-1302927356)
  - Volume 1: War Ghost (collects #1–6, tpb, 144 pages, 2019, ISBN 978-1302917494)
  - Volume 2: Dead in the Water (collects #7–12, tpb, 136 pages, 2020, ISBN 978-1302917500)
- Daredevil:
  - Daredevil vol. 6 (April 2019–December 2021)
    - Collected in Trade Paperbacks as:
      - Volume 1: Know Fear (collects #1–5, writer/artist, tpb, w/ Marco Checchetto, 120 pages, 2019, ISBN 978-1302914981)
      - Volume 2: No Devils, Only God (collects #6–10, writer, tpb, w/ Lalit Kumar Sharma and Jorge Fornés, 112 pages, 2019, ISBN 978-1302914998
      - Volume 3: Through Hell (collects #11–15, writer, tpb, w/ Marco Checchetto and Francesco Mobili 112 pages, 2020, ISBN 978-1302920180)
      - Volume 4: End of Hell (collects #16–20, writer, tpb, with Jorge Fornés and Marco Checchetto, 112 pages, 2020, ISBN 978-1302925802)
      - Volume 5: Truth/Dare (collects #21–25, Annual #1, writer, tpb, w/ Marco Checchetto, Francesco Mobili, and Mike Hawthorne, 144 pages, 2021, ISBN 978-1302925819)
      - Volume 6: Doing Time (collects #26–30, writer, tpb, w/ Marco Checchetto and Mike Hawthorne, 120 pages, 2021, ISBN 978-1302926090)
      - Volume 7: Lockdown (collects #31–36, writer, tpb, w/ Marco Checchetto, Mike Hawthorne, Stefano Landini, and Manuel Garcia, 2022, ISBN 978-1302926106)
    - Collected in Oversized Hardcovers as:
      - Volume 1: To Heaven Through Hell (collects #1–10, hc, 232 pages, 2021, ISBN 978-1302928247)
      - Volume 2: To Heaven Through Hell Vol. 2 (collects #11–20, hc, 224 pages, 2022, ISBN 978-1302931995)
      - Volume 3: To Heaven Through Hell Vol. 3 (collects #21–30 and Annual #1, hc, 264 pages, 2022, ISBN 978-1302945114)
      - Volume 4: To Heaven Through Hell Vol. 4 (collects #31-36, Daredevil: Woman Without Fear #1-3, hc, 232 pages, 2023, ISBN 978-1302950057)
      - Daredevil by Chip Zdarsky Omnibus Vol. 1 (collects #1-30 and Annual 1, ohc, 696 pages, 2024, ISBN 978-1302956219)
      - Daredevil by Chip Zdarsky Omnibus Vol. 2 (collects #31-31, ohc, 786 pages, 2024, ISBN 978-1302956264)
  - Devil's Reign (writer, 6-issue limited series, with Marco Checchetto, December 2021 – April 2022) collected in
    - Devil's Reign (tpb, 208 pages, 2022, ISBN 978-1302932848)
  - Daredevil: Woman Without Fear (writer, 3-issue limited series, with Rafael De Latorre, January–March 2022) collected in
    - Daredevil: Woman Without Fear (tpb, 120 pages, 2022, ISBN 978-1302934934)
  - Daredevil vol. 7 (writer, with Marco Checchetto, Rafeal De Latorre, and Manuel Garcia, July 2022-August 2023)
    - Volume 1: The Red Fist Saga Part One (collects #1-5, writer/artist, with Ann Nocenti and various, tpb, 2023, ISBN 978-1302926113)
    - Volume 2: The Red Fist Saga Part Two (collects #6-10, writer, with Marco Checchetto, Rafael De Latorre, and Manuel Garcia, tpb, 2023, ISBN 978-1302932510)
    - Volume 3: The Red Fist Saga Part Three (collects #11-14, writer, with Marco Checchetto and Rafael De Latorre, tpb, 2023, ISBN 978-1302947712)
    - Daredevil by Chip Zdarsky Omnibus Vol. 2 (collects #1-14, ohc, 786 pages, 2024, ISBN 978-1302956264)
- War of the Realms: War Scrolls #1: "Waugh of the Realms" (writer, with Joe Quinones, June 2019) collected in
  - War of the Realms Omnibus (hc, 1576 pages, 2020, ISBN 978-1302926410)
- Marvel Comics #1000: "Armor: Disassemble": (writer/artist, one-shot, October 2019) collected as
  - Marvel Comics #1000 (hc, 144 pages, 2020, ISBN 978-1302921378)
- X-Men/Fantastic Four vol. 2 #1–4 (writer, 4-issue limited series, with Terry Dodson, April–September 2020) collected as
  - X-Men/Fantastic Four: 4X (tpb, 128 pages, 2020, ISBN 978-1302920036)
- Doom 2099 vol. 2 #1 (writer, one-shot, with Marco Castiello, February 2020) collected in
  - Amazing Spider-Man 2099 Companion (tpb 296 pages, 2020, ISBN 978-1302924928)
- Incoming! #1: "5–8" (writer, one-shot, with Jorge Fornés, February 2020) collected in
  - Road to Empyre (tpb, 2020, ISBN 978-1302925888)
- Lords of Empyre: Emperor Hulkling #1 (co-writer, one-shot, with Anthony Oliveira and Manuel Garcia, September 2020) collected in
  - Empyre: Lords of Empyre (tpb, 168 pages, 2020, ISBN 978-1302925918)
- Carnage: Black, White & Blood #2: "My Red Hands" (writer, with Marco Checchetto, April 2021)
- Story in Free Comic Book Day 2021: Spider-Man/Venom (one-shot, with Greg Smallwood, August 2021)
- Howard the Duck vol. 7 #1: "Into (Looking at) the Multiverse" (writer, one-shot, with Joe Quinones, November 2023)
- Avengers: Twilight #1–6 (writer, limited series, with Daniel Acuña, January 2024–May 2024)
- Free Comic Book Day 2025: Fantastic Four/X-Men: "Popularity Contest" (writer/artist, May 2025)
- Giant-Size Amazing Spider-Man #1 (writer, one-shot, with CAFU, June 2025)
- Captain America vol. 12 #1–current (writer, with Valerio Schiti, July 2025–)
- Fantastic Four Fanfare #3 (writer, one-shot, with Marcos Martín, July 2025)

=== Other publishers ===
- DSTLRY
  - White House Robot Romance (writer, with Rachael Stott, 2025-2026)
- Royal Academy of Illustration & Design
  - Monster Cops (writer/artist, 2003; republished by Legion of Evil Press in 2006)
- Legion of Evil Press
  - Prison Funnies #1–2 (writer/artist, 2003)
  - Chip Zdarsky's Monster Cops (writer/artist, 2006)
  - Comics Festival!: Monster Cops (writer/artist, 2007–2009)
- Substack
  - Kaptara #6–11 (writer, with Kagan Mcleod, August 2021–September 2023)
  - Public Domain #1–current (writer/artist, September 2021–)
  - Zdarsky Comic News #1–current (writer/artist/interviewer, July 2024–)
