= Matt Fraction =

American comic book writer (born 1975)

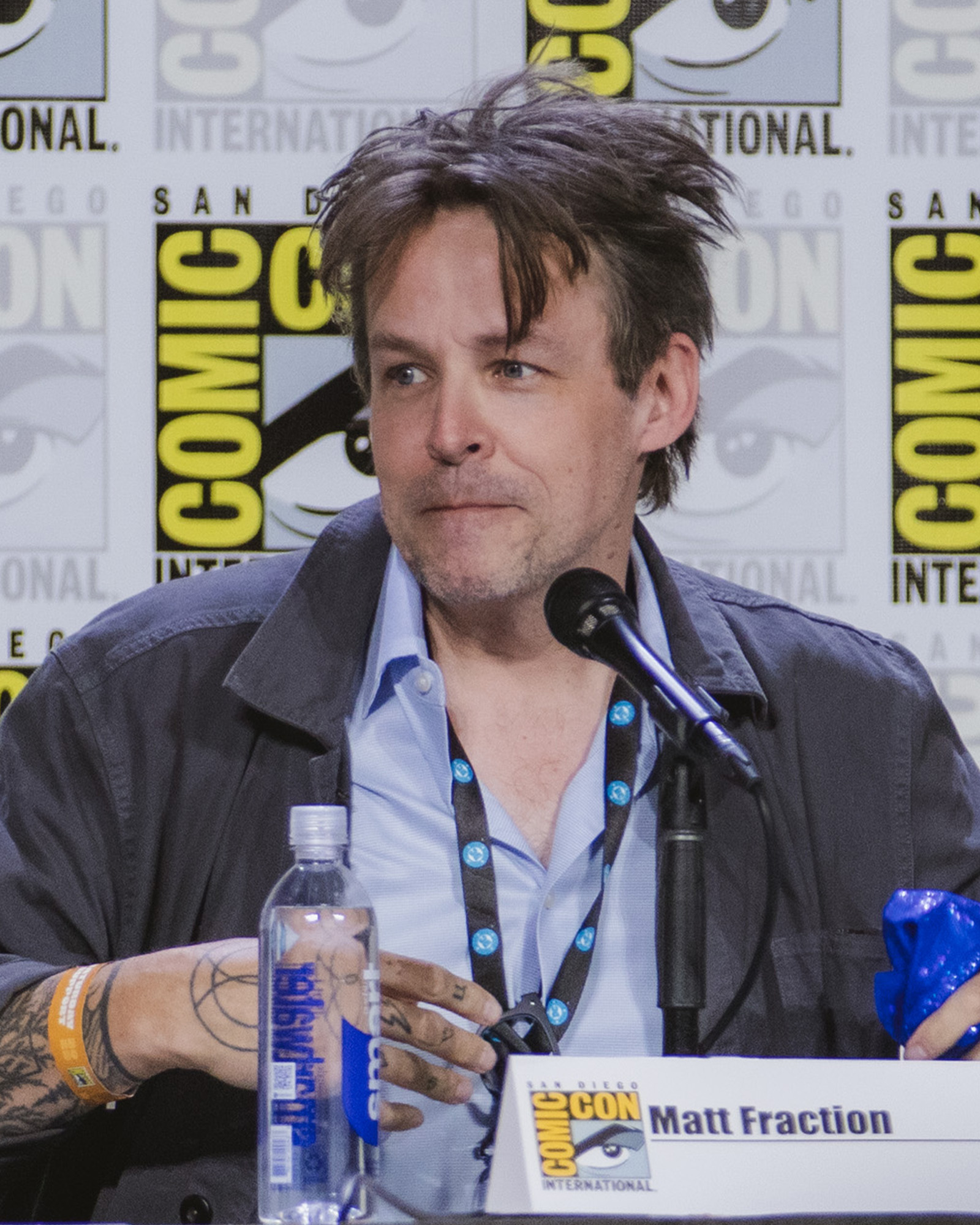
- Fraction in 2025
- Born: Matt Fritchman; December 1, 1975 (age 50) Chicago Heights, Illinois, U.S.
- Area: Writer
- Notable works: Hawkeye; Sex Criminals; The Invincible Iron Man; The Immortal Iron Fist; Casanova; Uncanny X-Men; FF
- Awards: "Favourite Newcomer Writer" Eagle Award (2007) "Best New Series" Eisner Award (2009); Inkpot Award (2016)
- Spouse: Kelly Sue DeConnick

Matt Fritchman (born December 1, 1975), better known by the pen name Matt Fraction, is an American comic book writer, known for his work as the writer of The Invincible Iron Man, FF, The Immortal Iron Fist, Uncanny X-Men, and Hawkeye for Marvel Comics; Casanova and Sex Criminals for Image Comics; and Superman's Pal Jimmy Olsen and Batman for DC Comics.

He co-created the series Monarch: Legacy of Monsters (2023) alongside Chris Black, which is part of the Monsterverse.

His work has won numerous Eisner Awards and Harvey Awards, and been on the The New York Times Best Seller list.

== Early life ==
Matt Fraction was born on December 1, 1975, in Chicago Heights, Illinois. As a child, he developed an affinity for telling stories, and he enjoyed reading comic books and strips. The first comic he remembers buying was Batman #316 (Oct. 1979), and he liked newspaper comics Peanuts and Doonesbury. He became a regular weekly comic-book reader around the time that the 1985–86 DC Comics storyline "Crisis on Infinite Earths" ended, but he found that storyline bizarre and impenetrable and gravitated toward Marvel Comics instead. Spider-Man became his favorite character, and he read other Marvel publications such as Star Wars and G.I. Joe.

In the late 1990s Fraction worked as an employee at the Charlotte, North Carolina–based comics retailer Heroes Aren't Hard to Find, and participated in the Warren Ellis Forum under the username "Matt Fraction".

== Career ==
Fraction started in the comics industry by working for smaller publishers including AiT/Planet Lar and IDW Publishing, many of which employed people that he had met on the Warren Ellis Forum; as such, he continued using the "Fraction" name as it was the one under which he had built a reputation. He became known early in his career for his creator-owned work on The Five Fists of Science and Casanova, before taking on a number of assignments for Marvel Comics.

Fraction wrote two columns for Comic Book Resources: "Poplife" and "The Basement Tapes", the latter with Joe Casey.

Fraction teamed with Ed Brubaker for a run on Marvel's The Immortal Iron Fist. The pair re-teamed on Uncanny X-Men for a short time, after which Fraction wrote the series solo until leaving it in 2011.

He wrote The Mighty Thor and The Invincible Iron Man, the latter of which led to his consulting work on the set of the film Iron Man 2 and writing the Iron Man 2 video game that tied into that film sequel.

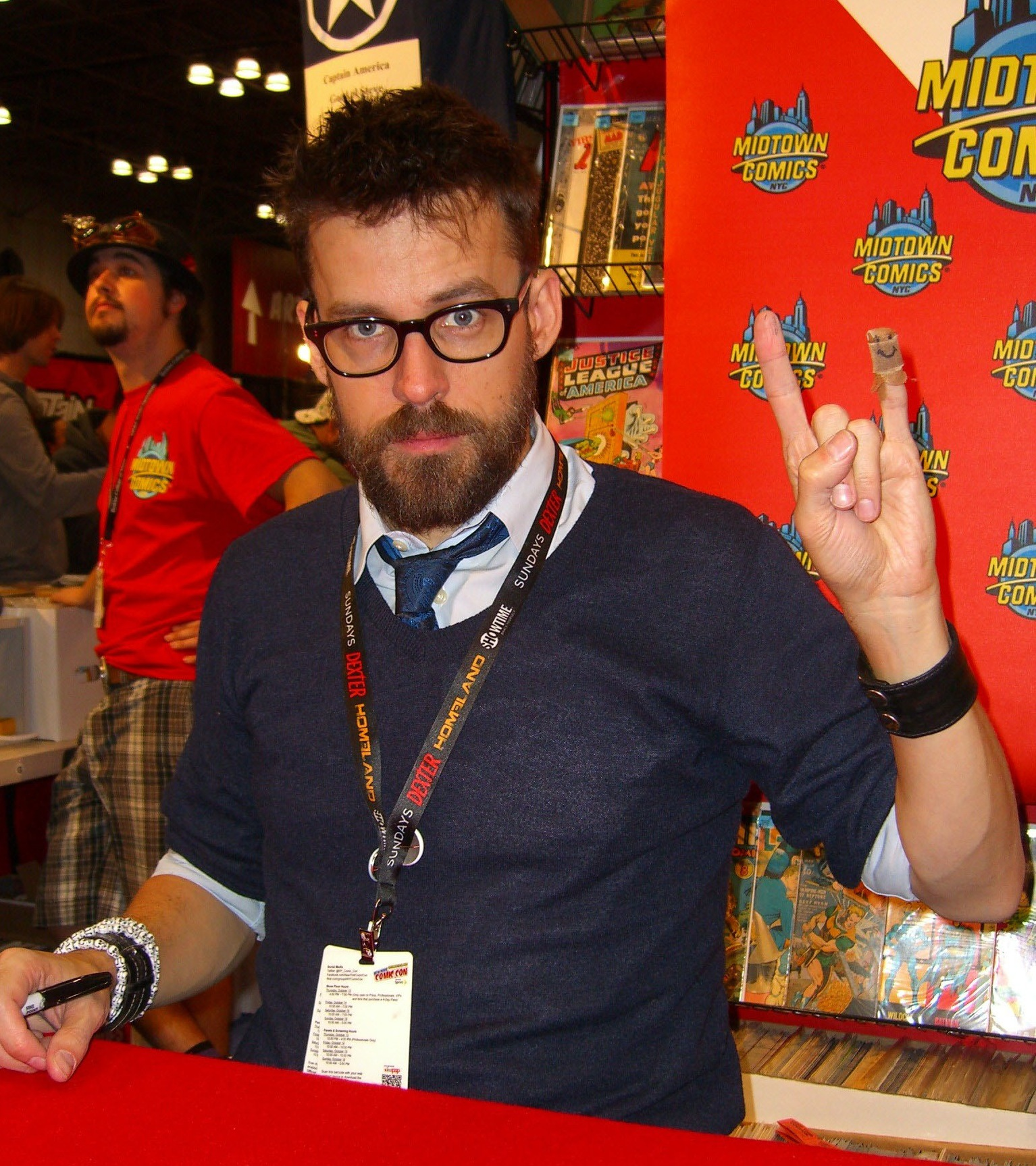
Fraction at the Midtown Comics booth at the 2011 New York Comic Con

In 2011, Fraction wrote the Fear Itself limited series, which was the central part of the crossover storyline of the same name. In December 2011, he revived the series The Defenders with artist Terry Dodson and, in August 2012, he started a new Hawkeye series with David Aja.

As part of Marvel NOW!, Fantastic Four was relaunched in November 2012 with the creative team of Fraction and artist Mark Bagley. Its spinoff series FF was produced by Fraction and artist Mike Allred. Fraction left both series due to other work commitments.

In February 2013, he was named on IGN's list of "The Best Tweeters in Comics", which described him as "the premier comics Twitter personality."

In 2013, Fraction and Chip Zdarsky co-created the Sex Criminals series for Image Comics. He and illustrator Christian Ward created the ODY-C series in 2014, a science-fiction retelling of the Odyssey with the characters' genders changed to female.

In 2015, Fraction and Fabio Moon returned to Casanova with a new eight-issue mini-series, Acedia. The series featured backup stories written by Michael Chabon with art by Casanova co-creator Gabriel Bá. Also in 2015, Fraction and Kelly Sue DeConnick's company, Milkfed Criminal Masterminds, signed a two-year deal with Universal Television to adapt some of their comic books, as well as original TV series concepts. They also planned to use Milkfed Criminal Masterminds as a TV launchpad for other comic creators' properties.

In 2018, Milkfed Criminal Masterminds signed another two-year overall deal, this time with Legendary TV to adapt several of their creator-owned comics, as well as produce exclusive, original projects developed by the duo for television across traditional and non-traditional platforms.

In 2019, Fraction and Elsa Charretier co-created the graphic novella crime series, November, for Image Comics. Meanwhile, Fraction wrote his first series for DC Comics, the twelve-issue series Superman's Pal, Jimmy Olsen which was drawn by Steve Lieber.

In 2020, Sex Criminals concluded with issue #69, volumes 2 and 3 of November were released, and Adventureman, the long-anticipated series from Fraction and Terry Dodson and Rachel Dodson began releasing from Image Comics, and his and Lieber's run on Superman's Pal, Jimmy Olsen concluded, with a collected trade paperback entitled Who Killed Jimmy Olsen? being released in October.

Fraction served as a consultant for the Hawkeye television miniseries, which was heavily inspired by his 2012 comic run. He also planned to make a cameo appearance as a member of the Tracksuit Mafia, but was unable to commit to this, due to complications stemming from the COVID-19 pandemic.

Since 2022, Fraction has been working on the Apple TV+ show Monarch: Legacy of Monsters, on which he is a co-creator with Chris Black. The series debuted in November 2023 and Fraction wrote episode 9, "Axis Mundi".

In February 2025, it was announced that Fraction would pen the relaunch of Batman in September that same year, with Jorge Jimenez providing the artwork.

In April 2025, it was announced Fraction would be writing a tie-in comic for the MCU film The Fantastic Four: First Steps. The comic, set to be an in-universe comic published by the Future Foundation with the "first-ever authorized retelling of the Fantastic Four's early adventures", will be illustrated by Mark Buckingham with cover art by Phil Noto and set for release July 2 that same year.

== Personal life ==
Fraction is married to Kelly Sue DeConnick, a comic book writer and adapter of manga into English, whom he met when they were both participants on the Warren Ellis Forum. They have two children, Henry and Tallulah.

== Awards ==
- 2008 Eagle Award for Favourite Newcomer Writer
- 2009 Eisner Award for "Best New Series" for The Invincible Iron Man (shared with Salvador Larroca)
- 2010 PEN Center USA Literary Award for "Outstanding Body of Work"
- 2014 Harvey Award
  - "Best Single Issue or Story" for Hawkeye #11, "Pizza Is My Business" (shared with David Aja and others).
  - "Best New Series" for Sex Criminals (shared with Chip Zdarsky).
- 2014 Eisner Award
  - "Best Single Issue (or One-Shot)" for Hawkeye #11, "Pizza Is My Business" (shared with David Aja).
  - "Best New Series" for Sex Criminals (shared with Chip Zdarsky).
- 2016 Inkpot Award

=== Nominations ===
- 2008 Eisner Award
  - Best Single Issue (or One-Shot) for The Sensational Spider-Man Annual (shared with Salvador Larroca).
  - Eisner Award for Best New Series for The Immortal Iron Fist (shared with Ed Brubaker, David Aja and others)
- 2013 Harvey Award
  - Best Writer for Hawkeye
  - Best New Series for Hawkeye (shared with David Aja and others)
  - Best Continuing or Limited Series for Hawkeye (shared with David Aja and others)
  - Best Single Issue or Story for Hawkeye #1, "Lucky" (shared with David Aja and others)
- 2013 Eisner Award
  - Best Continuing Series for Hawkeye (shared with David Aja and others)
  - Best Writer for Hawkeye and Casanova: Avarita
- 2014 Harvey Award
  - Best Writer for Hawkeye
  - Best Continuing or Limited Series for Hawkeye (shared with David Aja and others)
- 2014 Eisner Award
  - Best Continuing Series for Hawkeye (shared with David Aja)
  - Best Continuing Series for Sex Criminals (shared with Chip Zdarsky)
  - Best Writer for Sex Criminals, Hawkeye, Fantastic Four, and FF
- 2014 Angoulême Sélection Officielle for Hawkeye, Vol 1 (shared with David Aja)

== Bibliography ==
=== Early work ===
- Double Take #6–8: "Rex Mantooth" (with Andy Kuhn, anthology, Funk-O-Tron, 2001–2002) collected as The Annotated Mantooth! (tpb, 96 pages, AiT/Planet Lar, 2002, ISBN 1-932051-05-8)
- Last of the Independents (with Kieron Dwyer, graphic novel, sc, 104 pages, AiT/Planet Lar, 2003, ISBN 1-932051-14-7; hc, 112 pages, Image, 2020, ISBN 1-5343-1592-6)
- IDW Publishing:
  - 30 Days of Night: Bloodsucker Tales #1–8: "Juarez, or Lex Nova and the Case of the 400 Dead Mexican Girls" (with Ben Templesmith, co-feature, 2004–2005)
    - Collected, along with the leading feature, in 30 Days of Night: Bloodsucker Tales (hc, 200 pages, 2005, ISBN 1-933239-11-5; tpb, 2005, ISBN 1-932382-78-X)
    - Collected in a separate volume as 30 Days of Night: Juarez (tpb, 104 pages, 2009, ISBN 1-60010-405-3)
  - Metal Gear Solid: Sons of Liberty #0 (untitled five-page story with Ashley Wood, 2005)
    - Collected in Metal Gear Solid Omnibus (tpb, 552 pages, 2010, ISBN 1-60010-663-3)
    - Collected in Metal Gear Solid: Deluxe Edition (hc, 608 pages, 2014, ISBN 1-61377-999-2)

=== Image Comics ===
- Four Letter Worlds: "Fate" (with Kieron Dwyer, anthology graphic novel, 144 pages, 2005, ISBN 1-58240-439-9)
- 24Seven Volume 1: "Static" (with Frazer Irving, anthology graphic novel, 224 pages, 2006, ISBN 1-58240-636-7)
- The Five Fists of Science (with Steven Sanders, graphic novel, 112 pages, 2006, ISBN 1-58240-605-7)
- Casanova (with Gabriel Bá and Fábio Moon):
  - Casanova #1–14 (2006–2008)
    - Issues #1–7 are collected as Album 1: Luxuria (hc, 144 pages, 2007, ISBN 1-58240-689-8; tpb, 2008, ISBN 1-58240-897-1)
    - A colorized and relettered version of these fourteen issues was published as two 4-issue limited series under Marvel's Icon imprint.
  - Casanova: Acedia (with the Metanauts back-up feature, written by Michael Chabon and drawn by Gabriel Bá, 2015–2017) collected as:
    - Volume 1 (collects #1–4, tpb, 136 pages, 2015, ISBN 1-63215-477-3)
    - Volume 2 (collects #5–8, tpb, 136 pages, 2017, ISBN 1-63215-875-2)
- Sex Criminals (with Chip Zdarsky, 2013–2020) collected as:
  - Big Hard Sex Criminals Volume 1 (collects #1–10, hc, 256 pages, 2015, ISBN 1-63215-243-6)
  - Big Hard Sex Criminals Volume 2 (collects #11–20, hc, 256 pages, 2018, ISBN 1-5343-0706-0)
  - Big Hard Sex Criminals Volume 3 (collects #21–30 and 69, hc, 320 pages, 2021, ISBN 1-5343-1909-3)
    - Includes Sex Criminals: Sexual Gary Special (written by Fraction, art by Rachael Stott, 2020)
- Satellite Sam (with Howard Chaykin, 2013–2015) collected as Satellite Sam (hc, 400 pages, 2015, ISBN 1-63215-478-1)
- ODY-C #1–12 (with Christian Ward, 2014–2016) collected as ODY-C: Cycle One (hc, 400 pages, 2016, ISBN 1-63215-927-9)
- Solid State (script by Fraction based on the concept by Jonathan Coulton, art by Albert Monteys, graphic novel, sc, 128 pages, 2017, ISBN 1-5343-0365-0; hc, 2018, ISBN 1-5343-0309-X)
- Bitch Planet: Triple Feature #5: "Everyone's Grandma is a Little Bit Feminist" (with Elsa Charretier, anthology, 2017) collected in Bitch Planet: Triple Feature (tpb, 144 pages, 2017, ISBN 1-5343-0529-7)
- November (with Elsa Charretier, series of graphic novels):
  - Volume 1 (hc, 80 pages, 2019, ISBN 1-5343-1354-0)
  - Volume 2 (hc, 80 pages, 2020, ISBN 1-5343-1369-9)
  - Volume 3 (hc, 80 pages, 2020, ISBN 1-5343-1602-7)
  - Volume 4 (hc, 80 pages, 2021, ISBN 1-5343-1821-6)
- Adventureman (with Terry Dodson, 2020–ongoing) collected as:
  - The End and Everything After (collects #1–4, hc, 168 pages, 2020, ISBN 1-5343-1712-0)
  - A Fairy Tale of New York (collects #5–9, hc, 168 pages, 2022, ISBN 1-5343-2214-0)
- The Old Guard: Tales Through Time #4: "How to Make a Ghost Town" (with Steve Lieber, anthology, 2021) collected in The Old Guard: Tales Through Time (tpb, 176 pages, 2021, ISBN 1-5343-2005-9)

=== Marvel Comics ===
- X-Men:
  - X-Men Unlimited vol. 2 #9: "Dead Man Walking" (with Sam Kieth, anthology, 2005) collected in Astonishing X-Men Companion (tpb, 168 pages, 2020, ISBN 1-302-92285-8)
  - Uncanny X-Men (with Terry Dodson, Greg Land, Yanick Paquette (#512), Whilce Portacio, Phil Jimenez (#522), Leonard Kirk (#527) and Harvey Tolibao (#529), 2008–2011) collected as:
    - Uncanny X-Men by Matt Fraction: The Complete Collection Volume 1 (collects #500–511 and Annual #2, tpb, 384 pages, 2013, ISBN 0-7851-6593-2)
      - Includes the "Migas" short story (art by Jamie McKelvie) from X-Men: Divided We Stand #1 (anthology, 2008)
      - Issues #500–503 are co-written by Fraction and Ed Brubaker.
    - Uncanny X-Men by Matt Fraction: The Complete Collection Volume 2 (collects #512–519, tpb, 368 pages, 2013, ISBN 0-7851-6594-0)
      - Includes the "How I Survived Apocalyptic Fire" short story (art by Daniel Acuña) from Dark Reign: The Cabal (anthology one-shot, 2009)
      - Includes the Dark Avengers/Uncanny X-Men: Utopia one-shot (written by Fraction, art by Marc Silvestri, 2009)
      - Includes Dark Avengers #7–8 (written by Fraction, art by Luke Ross, 2009) as part of Utopia inter-title crossover.
      - Includes the Dark Avengers/Uncanny X-Men: Exodus one-shot (written by Fraction, art by Mike Deodato, Jr., 2009)
      - Includes the Dark Reign: The List—X-Men one-shot (written by Fraction, art by Alan Davis, 2009)
    - Uncanny X-Men by Matt Fraction: The Complete Collection Volume 3 (collects #520–522 and 526–534, tpb, 336 pages, 2013, ISBN 0-7851-8450-3)
      - Includes the Uncanny X-Men: The Heroic Age one-shot (written by Fraction, art by Whilce Portacio, Steven Sanders and Jamie McKelvie, 2010)
      - Issues #531–534 are co-written by Fraction and Kieron Gillen.
    - X-Men: Second Coming (includes #523–525, hc, 392 pages, 2010, ISBN 0-7851-4678-4; tpb, 2011, ISBN 0-7851-5705-0)
      - Includes Fraction's chapter of the epilogue from X-Men: Second Coming #2 (art by Terry Dodson, 2010)
- The Immortal Iron Fist (co-written by Fraction and Ed Brubaker):
  - The Last Iron Fist Story (hc, 160 pages, 2007, ISBN 0-7851-2854-9; tpb, 2007, ISBN 0-7851-2489-6) collects:
    - Civil War: Choosing Sides: "The Immortal Iron Fist" (with David Aja, anthology one-shot, 2006)
    - "The Last Iron Fist Story" (with David Aja, Travel Foreman, John Severin, Russ Heath and Sal Buscema, in #1–6, 2007)
  - The Seven Capital Cities of Heaven (hc, 216 pages, 2008, ISBN 0-7851-2992-8; tpb, 2008, ISBN 0-7851-2535-3) collects:
    - "Men of a Certain Deadly Persuasion" (with Howard Chaykin, Dan Brereton and Jelena Kevic-Djurdjević, in Annual, 2007)
    - "The Seven Capital Cities of Heaven" (with David Aja, Roy Martinez, Scott Koblish, Kano, Javier Pulido, Tonči Zonjić and Clay Mann, in #8–14, 2007–2008)
  - The Book of Iron Fist (hc, 160 pages, 2008, ISBN 0-7851-2993-6; tpb, 2009, ISBN 0-7851-2536-1) collects:
    - "The Pirate Queen of Pinghai Bay" (with Travel Foreman, Leandro Fernández and Khari Evans, in #7, 2007)
    - Orson Randall and the Green Mist of Death (with Russ Heath, Mitch Breitweiser, Nick Dragotta and Lewis LaRosa, one-shot, 2008)
    - The Origin of Danny Rand (with Kano, two-page framing sequence for a reprint of Marvel Premiere #15–16, one-shot, 2008)
    - "The Story of the Iron Fist Bei Bang-Wen (1827–1860)" (with Khari Evans, in #15, 2008)
    - "Happy Birthday Danny" (with David Aja, in #16, 2008)
  - Omnibus (collects #1–16, Annual, Civil War: Choosing Sides, Orson Randall and the Green Mist of Death and The Origin of Danny Rand, hc, 560 pages, 2009, ISBN 0-7851-3819-6)
  - The Complete Collection Volume 1 (collects #1–16, Annual, Civil War: Choosing Sides, Orson Randall and the Green Mist of Death and The Origin of Danny Rand, tpb, 496 pages, 2013, ISBN 0-7851-8542-9)
- Punisher War Journal vol. 2 (with Ariel Olivetti, Mike Deodato, Jr. (#4), Leandro Fernández (#11), Cory Walker (#13), Scott Wegener (#14–15), Howard Chaykin and Andy MacDonald (#26), 2007–2009) collected as:
  - Issues #19–25 are co-written by Fraction and Rick Remender.
    - Civil War (collects #1–4, hc, 144 pages, 2007, ISBN 0-7851-2775-5; tpb, 2007, ISBN 0-7851-2315-6)
    - Goin' Out West (collects #5–11, hc, 168 pages, 2007, ISBN 0-7851-2852-2; tpb, 2008, ISBN 0-7851-2636-8)
    - Hunter/Hunted (collects #12–17, hc, 152 pages, 2008, ISBN 0-7851-3021-7; tpb, 2008, ISBN 0-7851-2664-3)
    - Jigsaw (collects #18–23, hc, 144 pages, 2008, ISBN 0-7851-3022-5; tpb, 2009, ISBN 0-7851-2964-2)
    - Secret Invasion (collects #24–26, hc, 120 pages, 2009, ISBN 0-7851-3148-5; tpb, 2009, ISBN 0-7851-3170-1)
- Spider-Man:
  - The Sensational Spider-Man vol. 2 Annual: "To Have and to Hold" (with Salvador Larocca, 2007) collected in Peter Parker, Spider-Man: Back in Black (hc, 336 pages, 2007, ISBN 0-7851-2920-0; tpb, 2008, ISBN 0-7851-2997-9)
  - The Amazing Spider-Man: Presidents' Day Celebration (with Andy MacDonald, digital one-shot, 2009) collected in The Amazing Spider-Man: Election Day (hc, 184 pages, 2009, ISBN 0-7851-4131-6; tpb, 2010, ISBN 0-7851-3419-0)
- The Order (with Barry Kitson, Khari Evans (#5) and Javier Saltares (#9–10), 2007–2008) collected as:
  - The Next Right Thing (collects #1–5, tpb, 128 pages, 2008, ISBN 0-7851-2795-X)
  - California Dreaming (collects #6–10, tpb, 120 pages, 2008, ISBN 0-7851-2796-8)
- The Invincible Iron Man (with Salvador Larroca, Jamie McKelvie (co-features in #32–33), Kano + Nathan Fox + Carmine Di Giandomenico (#500) and Howard Chaykin (co-feature in #503), 2008–2012) collected as:
  - The Five Nightmares (collects #1–7, hc, 184 pages, 2008, ISBN 0-7851-3461-1; tpb, 2009, ISBN 0-7851-3412-3)
  - World's Most Wanted Volume 1 (collects #8–13, hc, 152 pages, 2009, ISBN 0-7851-3828-5; tpb, 2010, ISBN 0-7851-3413-1)
  - World's Most Wanted Volume 2 (collects #14–19, hc, 160 pages, 2010, ISBN 0-7851-3935-4; tpb, 2010, ISBN 0-7851-3685-1)
  - Stark Disassembled (collects #20–24, hc, 136 pages, 2010, ISBN 0-7851-4554-0; tpb, 2011, ISBN 0-7851-3686-X)
  - Stark Resilient Volume 1 (collects #25–28, hc, 128 pages, 2010, ISBN 0-7851-4555-9; tpb, 2011, ISBN 0-7851-4556-7)
  - Stark Resilient Volume 2 (collects #29–33, hc, 136 pages, 2011, ISBN 0-7851-4834-5; tpb, 2011, ISBN 0-7851-4835-3)
  - My Monsters (collects #500, 500.1, Annual and the co-feature from #503, hc, 168 pages, 2011, ISBN 0-7851-4836-1; tpb, 2011, ISBN 0-7851-4837-X)
  - Unfixable (includes #501–503, hc, 120 pages, 2011, ISBN 0-7851-5322-5; tpb, 2012, ISBN 0-7851-5323-3)
    - Includes the Free Comic Book Day 2010: Iron Man/Thor special (written by Fraction, art by John Romita, Jr., 2010)
  - Fear Itself (collects #504–509 and Fear Itself #7.3, hc, 168 pages, 2012, ISBN 0-7851-5773-5; tpb, 2012, ISBN 0-7851-5774-3)
  - Demon (collects #510–515, hc, 144 pages, 2012, ISBN 0-7851-6046-9; tpb, 2013, ISBN 0-7851-6047-7)
  - Long Way Down (collects #516–520, hc, 112 pages, 2012, ISBN 0-7851-6048-5; tpb, 2013, ISBN 0-7851-6049-3)
  - The Future (collects #521–527, hc, 152 pages, 2013, ISBN 0-7851-6521-5; tpb, 2013, ISBN 0-7851-6522-3)
- Thor:
  - Thor: Ages of Thunder (hc, 160 pages, 2009, ISBN 0-7851-3567-7; tpb, 2009, ISBN 0-7851-3568-5) collects:
    - Thor: Ages of Thunder (with Patrick Zircher and Khari Evans, one-shot, 2008)
    - Thor: Reign of Blood (with Patrick Zircher and Khari Evans, one-shot, 2008)
    - Thor: Man of War (with Patrick Zircher and Clay Mann, one-shot, 2009)
    - Thor God-Sized Special (with Dan Brereton, Doug Braithwaite, Mike Allred and Miguel Sepulveda, one-shot, 2009)
  - Secret Invasion: Thor #1–3 (with Doug Braithwaite, 2008) collected as Secret Invasion: Thor (tpb, 96 pages, 2009, ISBN 0-7851-3426-3)
  - Thor #615–621 (with Pasqual Ferry, 2010–2011) collected as Thor: The World Eaters (hc, 216 pages, 2011, ISBN 0-7851-4838-8; tpb, 2011, ISBN 0-7851-4839-6)
  - The Mighty Thor (with Olivier Coipel, Pasqual Ferry, Pepe Larraz, Giuseppe Camuncoli (#12), Barry Kitson (#12.1 and 22), Alan Davis (#18) and Carmine Di Giandomenico, 2011–2012) collected as:
    - Volume 1 (collects #1–6, hc, 144 pages, 2011, ISBN 0-7851-5691-7; tpb, 2012, ISBN 0-7851-5624-0)
    - Volume 2 (collects #7–12 and Fear Itself #7.2, hc, 168 pages, 2012, ISBN 0-7851-6243-7; tpb, 2012, ISBN 0-7851-5625-9)
    - Volume 3 (collects #12.1 and 13–17, hc, 136 pages, 2012, ISBN 0-7851-6166-X; tpb, 2013, ISBN 0-7851-6167-8)
    - The Mighty Thor/Journey into Mystery: Everything Burns (includes #18–22, hc, 216 pages, 2013, ISBN 0-7851-6168-6; tpb, 2013, ISBN 0-7851-6169-4)
      - Issues #18–21 are co-written by Fraction and Kieron Gillen.
- Captain America: Who Won't Wield the Shield?: "Doctor America" (with Howard Hallis and Brendan McCarthy, anthology one-shot, 2010) collected in Secret Wars Too (tpb, 208 pages, 2016, ISBN 1-302-90211-3)
- Casanova (Luxuria and Gula reprint the original Image series in colorized and relettered form with new short stories in Luxuria #1 (art by Fábio Moon) and Gula #4 (art by Gabriel Bá); published under the Icon imprint):
  - Casanova: Luxuria #1–4 (with Gabriel Bá, 2010) collected as Casanova: Luxuria (tpb, 160 pages, 2011, ISBN 0-7851-4862-0; hc, 168 pages, Image, 2014, ISBN 1-63215-161-8)
  - Casanova: Gula #1–4 (with Fábio Moon, 2011) collected as Casanova: Gula (tpb, 136 pages, 2012, ISBN 0-7851-4863-9; hc, 168 pages, Image, 2015, ISBN 1-63215-181-2)
  - Casanova: Avaritia #1–4 (with Gabriel Bá, 2011–2012) collected as Casanova: Avaritia (tpb, 152 pages, 2012, ISBN 0-7851-4864-7; hc, 176 pages, Image, 2015, ISBN 1-63215-191-X)
- Fear Itself #1–7 (with Stuart Immonen, 2011) collected as Fear Itself (hc, 240 pages, 2012, ISBN 0-7851-5662-3; tpb, 2012, ISBN 0-7851-5663-1)
- Shattered Heroes (co-written by Fraction, Christopher Yost and Cullen Bunn):
  - Battle Scars (with Scot Eaton, 2011–2012) collected as Battle Scars (tpb, 136 pages, 2012, ISBN 0-7851-6340-9)
  - Fear Itself: The Fearless #1–12 (with Mark Bagley and Paul Pelletier, 2012) collected as Fear Itself: The Fearless (hc, 272 pages, 2012, ISBN 0-7851-6343-3; tpb, 2013, ISBN 0-7851-6344-1)
- The Defenders vol. 4 (with Terry Dodson, Michael Lark (#4), Mitch Breiweiser (#5), Víctor Ibáñez (#6), Jamie McKelvie (#8–10) and Mirco Pierfederici (#11–12), 2011–2012) collected as:
  - Volume 1 (collects #1–6, tpb, 136 pages, 2012, ISBN 0-7851-5851-0)
    - Includes the "Shaman of Greenwich Village" short story (art by Terry Dodson) from Marvel Point One (anthology one-shot, 2012)
  - Volume 2 (collects #7–12, tpb, 136 pages, 2013, ISBN 0-7851-5853-7)
- Avengers vs. X-Men (hc, 568 pages, 2012, ISBN 0-7851-6317-4; tpb, 384 pages, 2013, ISBN 0-7851-6318-2) includes:
  - "Chapter Five" (with John Romita, Jr., in #5, 2012)
  - "Chapter Seven" (with Olivier Coipel, in #7, 2012)
  - AvX: VS #5: "Hawkeye vs. Angel" (with Leinil Francis Yu, anthology, 2012) also collected in Avengers vs. X-Men: VS (tpb, 160 pages, 2013, ISBN 0-7851-6520-7)
- Hawkeye vol. 4 (with David Aja, Javier Pulido (#4–5), Steve Lieber + Jesse Hamm (#7), Annie Wu and Francesco Francavilla (#10 and 12), 2012–2015) collected as:
  - Volume 1 (collects #1–11, hc, 272 pages, 2013, ISBN 0-7851-8487-2)
    - Includes Young Avengers Presents #6 (written by Fraction, art by Alan Davis, 2008)
  - Volume 2 (collects #12–22 and Annual, hc, 280 pages, 2015, ISBN 0-7851-5461-2)
  - Omnibus (collects #1–22, Annual and Young Avengers Presents #6, hc, 552 pages, 2015, ISBN 0-7851-9219-0)
- Fantastic Four:
  - Fantastic Four vol. 4 (with Mark Bagley and André Lima Araújo (#5.AU), 2013–2014) collected as:
    - New Departure, New Arrivals (collects #1–3 and FF vol. 2 #1–3, tpb, 144 pages, 2013, ISBN 0-7851-6659-9)
      - Includes the Ant-Man short story (art by Mike Allred) from Marvel NOW! Point One (anthology one-shot, 2012)
    - Road Trip (collects #4–8 and 5.AU, tpb, 136 pages, 2013, ISBN 0-7851-6660-2)
    - Doomed (collects #9–16, tpb, 184 pages, 2014, ISBN 0-7851-8883-5)
      - Issues #11–12 are co-written by Fraction and Christopher Sebela.
      - Issues #13–16 are scripted by Karl Kesel from Fraction's plots.
  - FF vol. 2 (with Mike Allred and Joe Quinones (#6 and 9), 2013–2014) collected as:
    - Fantastic Faux (collects #4–8, tpb, 112 pages, 2013, ISBN 0-7851-6663-7)
    - Family Freakout (collects #9–16, tpb, 184 pages, 2014, ISBN 0-7851-6664-5)
      - Issues #12–16 are scripted by Lee Allred from Fraction's plots.
  - Both series along with the short story from the Marvel NOW! Point One one-shot are collected into a single volume as Fantastic Four by Matt Fraction Omnibus (hc, 760 pages, 2015, ISBN 0-7851-9110-0)
- Inhumanity #1–2 (with Olivier Coipel, Leinil Francis Yu, Dustin Weaver, Nick Bradshaw and Todd Nauck, 2014) collected in Inhumanity (hc, 448 pages, 2014, ISBN 0-7851-9033-3; tpb, 2015, ISBN 0-7851-9034-1)
  - Following these issues, Fraction was supposed to launch an ongoing Inhuman series with artist Joe Madureira but due to "creative differences" the title was handed over to Charles Soule.

=== Other publishers ===
- For God and Country: An Illustrated Account of the Raid on Osama bin Laden (with Nathan Fox, a webcomic commissioned by GQ, 2011)
- Dark Horse Presents vol. 2 #25: "The Time Ben Fell in Love" (with Christian Ward, anthology, Dark Horse, 2013)
- Spitball: A CCAD Comics Anthology #1: "Three Stories" (with Chris Passabet, Columbus College of Art and Design, 2015)
- DC Comics:
  - Superman: The Truth Revealed (hc, 192 pages, 2020, ISBN 1-4012-9969-5; tpb, 2021, ISBN 1-77950-571-X) includes:
    - Superman: Heroes (co-written by Fraction, Brian Michael Bendis and Greg Rucka, art by various artists, one-shot, 2020)
    - Superman: Villains (co-written by Fraction, Brian Michael Bendis and Jody Houser, art by various artists, one-shot, 2020)
  - Superman's Pal Jimmy Olsen: Who Killed Jimmy Olsen? (tpb, 320 pages, 2020, ISBN 1-77950-462-4) collects:
    - Superman: Leviathan Rising: "One Wild Night in Gorilla City" (with Steve Lieber, co-feature in one-shot, 2019)
    - Superman's Pal Jimmy Olsen vol. 2 #1–12 (with Steve Lieber, 2019–2020)
  - Detective Comics #1027: "Many Happy Returns" (with Chip Zdarsky, co-feature, 2020)
  - Batman vol.4 #1−present: (with Jorge Jiménez, 2025−present)

== Other work ==
Fraction served as a consulting producer for the Disney+ series Hawkeye, which is heavily influenced by his stint writing for the Hawkeye comic. Fraction also serves as the co-creator, writer, and executive producer of Monarch: Legacy of Monsters alongside Chris Black.

Preceded by n/a	Punisher War Journal vol. 2 writer 2006–2009 (2008 with Rick Remender)	Succeeded by Rick Remender
Preceded by Ed Brubaker	Uncanny X-Men writer 2008–2011	Succeeded by Kieron Gillen
Preceded by Daniel and Charles Knauf	Iron Man writer 2008–2012	Succeeded by Kieron Gillen
Preceded by Kieron Gillen	Thor writer 2010–2012	Succeeded by Jason Aaron
Preceded by Jonathan Hickman	Fantastic Four writer 2012–2013	Succeeded by Karl Kesel
Preceded by Jonathan Hickman	Future Foundation writer 2012–2013	Succeeded by Lee Allred
