= Crystal Hills =

Mountain range in Death Valley National Park, California, United States

- Location within California

Highest point
- Elevation: 2,989 ft (911 m)

Geography
- Country: United States
- State: California
- Region: Mojave Desert
- District(s): Death Valley National Park, San Bernardino County
- Range coordinates: 35°43′9.853″N 116°57′18.154″W
- Topo map: USGS Hidden Spring

The Crystal Hills are a low mountain range in the Mojave Desert, west of the Owlshead Mountains partially in the extreme southwestern section of Death Valley National Park, California. The Hidden Springs topographic map shows the highest elevation as more than 3080 feet, just outside of the National Park boundaries.

The small range is in northern San Bernardino County.

The dominant Panamint Range lies west and north of the Crystal Hills.
