= Power (comics) =

Power, in comics, may refer to:

- Power Comics, a British comics publisher
- Power Comics (Eclipse Comics), an Eclipse Comics title that reprinted Powerman stories
- The Power family in Marvel Comics, connected with Power Pack:
  - James Power (comics), the father
  - Margaret Power, the mother
  - Alex Power
  - Julie Power
  - Jack Power (Marvel Comics)
  - Katie Power
- Josiah Power, a DC Comics character
- Powers (comics), an Icon Comics series from Brian Michael Bendis

It may also refer to:

- Brother Power the Geek, a DC Comics character
- Power Boy, a number of DC Comics superheroes
- Power Company, a DC Comics team
- Power Girl, a DC Comics superheroine
- Power Man, a number of Marvel Comics characters
- Power Princess, a Marvel Comics character
- Power ring (DC Comics), a DC Comics weapon used by the Green Lanterns (and later connected Corps)
- Power Ring (character), a number of DC Comics supervillains
- Power Surge (comics), a DC Comics storyline
- Supreme Power, a Marvel Comics fictional universe
- Ultimate Power, a Marvel Comics series that tied the Ultimate Marvel universe with the Supreme Power one
- Will to Power (comics), a Dark Horse Comics storyline

== See also ==
- Power (disambiguation)
