= Manhunter (Paul Kirk) =

- The cover of the second Paul Kirk Manhunter collection (1984), art by Walt Simonson.

Publication information
- Publisher: DC Comics
- First appearance: Adventure Comics #73 (April 1942)
- Created by: Jack Kirby; Joe Simon

In-story information
- Alter ego: Paul Kirk
- Team affiliations: All-Star Squadron

Manhunter (Paul Kirk) is a superhero and later anti-hero appearing in American comic books published by DC Comics. He was the first published character referred to as Manhunter within the DC Universe. Originally a plainclothes amateur detective character, Kirk was called "manhunter" only in the title of his stories, a slang term for someone who tracks down fugitives and criminals.

Another version of Paul Kirk is then introduced and officially adopts "Manhunter" as an alias in 1942. The character's stories ended in 1944. Paul Kirk was then revived in 1973 in a globe-trotting conspiracy thriller storyline told through a series of back-up stories published in Detective Comics #437-443. Reintroducing Kirk as a more ruthless and now lethal hero working against a villainous group called the Council, the story gave him a new costume, new weapons, and a superhuman healing ability. Though the 1973 story became a critical success with readers, Kirk dies at the end of it and was not resurrected by DC Comics. Instead, the Manhunter name has passed on to other heroes (one being a clone of Paul Kirk calling himself Kirk DePaul).

In the 1970s, DC Comics introduced an army of corrupt robots called Manhunters whose design resembled Kirk's original 1940s costume. The 1987 comic Secret Origins (vol. 2) #22 revealed Kirk had been encouraged to become a vigilante by manipulative Manhunter robots masquerading as altruistic humans. The robots then gave Kirk a costume based on their own design.

== Publication history ==
=== Golden Age ===
Paul Kirk was originally depicted as a non-costumed independent investigator, who helped police solve crimes during the early 1940s. Though the series was titled "Paul Kirk, Manhunter", Kirk did not use the Manhunter name as an alias. He appeared in Adventure Comics #58–72 (Jan. 1941 – March 1942).

Beginning with Adventure Comics #73, Joe Simon and Jack Kirby established a new Manhunter, Rick Nelson, a big game hunter who returns to his home in Empire City and concludes the most challenging game to hunt is people, specifically criminals. After the death of a friend at the hands of a super-villain, he becomes a crimefighter dressed in a red costume with a blue mask. One month earlier, the publisher Quality Comics had introduced its own costumed hero called Manhunter in Police Comics #8 (March 1942). This Manhunter was named Donald "Dan" Richards.

Though he was obviously a different character than the first DC Manhunter, the name Rick Nelson was changed to Paul Kirk in Adventure Comics #74 by an unknown editor. Rick Nelson's history as a game hunter and tracker were now considered part of Paul Kirk's back story. The Simon/Kirby team left the feature after #80, November 1942, although Kirby wrote a few more scripts. The Paul Kirk Manhunter appeared in Adventure Comics until #92 in June 1944, when wartime paper shortages caused DC to drop page counts and cancel his strip.

Dan Richards and Paul Kirk never meet in their original Golden Age stories because they were published by different companies. After Richards was acquired by DC Comics, they are depicted as contemporaries who each adopt the alias Manhunter almost simultaneously while being unaware of the other person using the name until months later. The series All-Star Squadron shows them meeting soon after the United States enters World War II. The two argue over who is allowed to continue using the Manhunter name, then resolve the dilemma by joining different teams, seemingly ensuring the two will rarely if ever cross paths during their adventures. Dan Richards becomes a member of the Freedom Fighters, while Paul Kirk remains active as a member of the All-Star Squadron.

=== 1970s revival ===
In 1973, decades after his original run of stories ended, Archie Goodwin and Walt Simonson brought back Paul Kirk in his Manhunter role in Detective Comics #437. Simonson noted:

He [Archie Goodwin] had this idea for doing a back-up story for Detective Comics which he was editing. He was going to do a lead Batman story and then have an eight-page short story in the back. He thought he would try to invent a character and do him in a way that contrasted with Batman. While Batman was dark and grim and very urban, this would be a guy in brighter colors and the whole world would be his stage. Where Batman was more or less an empty hand combatant, this guy would carry weaponry.

The 1970s Paul Kirk/Manhunter stories appeared primarily as 8-page backups in Batman's Detective Comics, at the time going through an incarnation as a "100-Page Super Spectacular" featuring mostly reprints of non-Batman stories. Only with the last episode of the series did Manhunter move to the front of the book, in a full-length team-up with Batman. The stories were all written by Goodwin, and were the breakout work for future fan favorite artist Simonson. Simonson later said that the distinctively dense layouts and breakdowns for many of the early Manhunter stories were done by Goodwin. Goodwin's work on Manhunter, in which he both updated an obscure Golden Age hero, and, in the series' last episode, took the daring approach of killing him off (one of the few comic book deaths that has actually "taken" and not been reversed or retconned away in the decades since it occurred) is very well regarded by both fans and other comics professionals, winning a number of Shazam Awards. Goodwin himself has cited the series as one of the three "best things I've done in comics". When the team was approached in the early 1990s to create a new story with the Paul Kirk character, Goodwin and Simonson together wrote a two-page plot, but Simonson, busy with a monthly series, failed to produce the layouts for Goodwin to script. Years later, after Goodwin's death, Walt Simonson acted on his wife Louise's suggestion that the story be completed without dialogue as a "silent" story.

In his 1970s revival, Kirk primarily uses three weapons: a modified Bolo Mauser, a Katar (कटार), and two shuriken "throwing stars" carried as part of his costume, on the chest. Simonson said of his costume design: "I did a bunch of preliminary designs and I think Archie thought my first costume was a little complex, but then I did a bunch of variations. They were just simpler and not as good, so we went with the original design. The only difference was originally I’d given him nine throwing stars. Archie wanted to include martial arts in the strip and I came across something that said nine was a mystical number in some of the martial arts cultures. But somewhere along the way, I realized that drawing nine throwing stars in every damn panel was going to be a big problem. So we fixed that!"

Although the names "Manhunter" and "Paul Kirk" were chosen as a nod to the 1940s character, Goodwin and Simonson did not originally intend this to be the same literal character. By this point, DC Comics had established that its modern-day heroes inhabited a world designated Earth-One while the Golden Age characters and their stories occupied the parallel reality called Earth-Two. Initially, the 1970s Manhunter was simply the Earth-One Paul Kirk, a new character. Later on, it was decided to establish a link with the 1940s stories as a quick and efficient means of providing backstory within the limited eight-page structure of one of the story chapters.

Goodwin and Simonson's new backstory explains that after spending some time as a crime-fighter in the US, Kirk returns to big game hunting and is then killed by an elephant on safari in 1946. His body is cryogenically preserved and eventually resurrected by the Council, a secret organization dedicated to controlling the human race to prevent humanity from causing its own extinction. Kirk is given advanced healing abilities by a geneticist-member of the Council and trained in the martial arts by one of their operatives.

To test Kirk's loyalty, the Council assigns him to kill an Interpol official while refusing to explain how this mission advances their stated goal of helping mankind. When Kirk tries to warn the agent instead, a group of clones attempts to kill him. Realizing that the Council have been corrupted by power, gradually warped from idealists into ruthless fanatics, Kirk begins to hunt down them and their agents. Eventually, Manhunter destroys the Council, sacrificing his own life to do so.

In 1975 DC published a second, completely independent Manhunter revival in 1st Issue Special #5, written and pencilled by Kirby. In this story an elderly human wearing the red and blue Manhunter costume retires and passes on the mantle to Mark Shaw. It is presumed Kirby meant the elder Manhunter to be Paul Kirk, despite this contradicting the Goodwin/Simonson revival. Since the elderly Manhunter is never identified, some readers concluded it was a new character. In the 1987 comic Secret Origins (vol. 2) #22, the corrupt Manhunters themselves confirm that this elderly Manhunter character was someone who took up the name and costume years after both Paul Kirk and Dan Richards had retired their own costumed identities in the 1940s.

Mark Shaw used the Manhunter identity throughout the 80s, with character Chase Lawler adopting the name and mantle in the 1990s. In 2001, the superhero group Power Company was introduced in JLA #61, followed by several one-shots providing an origin for each member and then the ongoing series Power Company in 2002. The team included a hero called Manhunter who resembled Paul Kirk and wore a black and white version of the costume he wore after being resurrected by the Council. The 2002 comic Power Company: Manhunter explained this character is a surviving clone of Kirk's who acts in the name of good and named himself Kirk DePaul. The series Power Company failed to gain popularity and ended with issue #18. In 2004, the Manhunter name was revived for a new series (Manhunter vol. 3) starring hero Kate Spencer. In issue #11 in 2005, Kirk DePaul makes an appearance and is murdered.

== Fictional biography ==
Cover art of Golden Age Paul Kirk, Manhunter, as depicted in Adventure Comics #79.

=== Golden Age ===
A natural athlete and tracker, Paul Kirk became a famous hunter of large and dangerous wildlife. Concluding there are no more challenges left in the jungle, Kirk returns home to Empire City (later retconned to be New York City). Concluding that criminals are the most challenging prey to track and capture, Kirk becomes an amateur detective, aiding the police in several cases. Eventually, costumed super-villains become more common and one named the Buzzard kills Police Inspector Donovan, a friend of Kirk's. Following Donovan's death, Kirk is contacted by the secret cult of the Manhunters, who claim that they are an organization dedicated to helping the cause of justice. The Manhunters reveal they are impressed with Kirk's abilities and want him to avenge not only Donovan, who was an agent of their organization, but to also fight against the rising threat of criminals. Kirk agrees and is given a red and blue costume by the Manhunters to keep his identity secret and "subtly" enhance his tracking abilities. Unbeknownst to Kirk, the Manhunters are actually corrupt robots who have been manipulating human agents and allies for centuries, biding their time until they are ready to attempt planetary and then universal conquest.

As the Manhunter, Kirk begins a double life as a costumed vigilante. With his tracking and athletic abilities, he fights a variety of gangsters and super-criminals such as "twerpy crime lord" Mr. Meek (who has a petrifying ray), the Rajah (armed with the hypnotic Burma Emerald), and a gang leader known as the Tiger. During his early adventures, Kirk learns there is another masked man operating under the name Manhunter. He is unaware this man, a police officer named Donald "Dan" Richards, was also encouraged to fight crime by the secret Manhunter organization.

Following the United States entering World War II, then President Franklin Delano Roosevelt uses Article X as a "superhero draft", asking all costumed champions to pool their resources as the All-Star Squadron and help protect the country. At an early meeting, both Dan Richards and Paul Kirk attend, meeting for the first time. Annoyed at first that they are both using the same alias, and unaware they were both inspired to do so by the same clandestine organization, the two heroes eventually make peace.

As WWII continues, the US government contacts Paul Kirk. Aware of his double identity, the government suggests that Kirk's talents would be more useful if he operated as a spy overseas rather than a non-powered vigilante. Kirk agrees and leaves crime-fighting behind to become a covert operative in the European Theater until the end of World War II. In 1946, Kirk returns to Africa to resume his old life as a tracker and hunter but finds he no longer has a taste for killing animals. Rather than kill his target, Kirk fires his gun into the air, only to accidentally startle an elephant that then kills him. Some years later, another man (whose name is not revealed) is recruited by the Manhunter organization and given the same red and blue costume worn by Paul Kirk. He continues fighting evil for decades.

=== The Resurrection of Paul Kirk ===
Paul Kirk's body is recovered by the Council, a group of ten individuals who concluded the invention of the atomic bomb is proof humanity will soon destroy itself unless stopped and properly guided. Impressed with Kirk's talent for fighting, athletics, and tracking, Council leader Mykros orders his chief scientist Dr. Oka to place him in suspended animation. Oka creates several clones of Kirk to act as the Council's elite soldiers before reawakening him decades later. Oka dies of a heart attack before Paul Kirk awakens, decades after his own death in 1946. Surprised to learn all that has transpired, Kirk initially accepts the Council at their word and agrees to become the leader of the clones. They give him new weapons and a new costume.

To become an even better combatant, Kirk undergoes intensive martial arts training by the Council's agent Asano Nitobe, said to be the last true master of ninjitsu. Nitobe, who was saved from the bombing of Nagasaki by Dr. Oka and afterward promised to serve him and the Council, trains Kirk for months not only in martial arts but in how to use his new healing abilities, which require mental concentration to be effective. Eventually, Kirk learns the Council uses nefarious methods such as assassination to carry out their goals and that it believes it must control humanity to save it. Leaving the organization, Kirk spends months opposing their operations, killing many of his own clones in the process.

Kirk's activities attract the attention of Interpol agent Christine St. Clair, who is shocked to learn her own superior and her father are Council operatives. Kirk and St. Claire then prove to Nitobe that Dr. Oka did not die of a heart attack but was instead murdered on order of the Council. To avenge the man who saved his life, Nitobe agrees to join Kirk and fight the Council as well. Soon afterward in Gotham City, police detective Dan Kingdom (a friend of Bruce Wayne) is murdered and the Prime Minister of Congola is assassinated on the grounds of Wayne Manor. Batman investigates and becomes aware of the Council and Kirk's team, which now includes weapons maker Kolu Mbeya. Batman joins Kirk's team on a raid of the Council headquarters. Mykros uses advanced technology to deliver a lethal blast of radiation against Kirk while Batman and the rest of the team get to safety. Kirk turns the Council technology against Mykros, destroying the base and himself along with it.

For the next few years, Christine St. Clair and Asano Nitobe hunt down the remaining clones of Kirk until they are satisfied they have killed them all. The last clone is hunted down and killed in Gotham City. Though he does not condone murder, Batman lets St. Clair and Nitobe escape the police after learning the man they killed was a remaining clone of Paul Kirk.

Six years after the second death of Paul Kirk, Nightwing tracks down an illegal arms dealer and smuggler named Kirk DePaul. DePaul reveals he is a clone of Paul Kirk who was able to fight off the Council's programming. Deciding to follow his own free will, he left the Council before Paul Kirk's final battle and the organization's destruction. Following his encounter with Nightwing, DePaul wears a version of Kirk's Council-made costume and uses the name Manhunter at times. Two years after his meeting with Nightwing, DePaul joins the Power Company. DePaul is later murdered by Mark Shaw after Shaw suffers a psychotic episode.

== Collected editions ==
The 1973–74 Goodwin/Simonson Paul Kirk Manhunter stories from Detective Comics have been collected several times: first in 1979 in oversized, black-and-white format by Excalibur Enterprises; then in color by DC in 1984; they were reissued yet again by DC in 1999 with additional material, namely a silent story illustrated by Simonson from a plot breakdown by Goodwin and him; the new collection was dedicated to Goodwin's memory, who had died before he could write the captions and dialogue (as explained in the book's text piece). This collection, titled Manhunter: The Special Edition (ISBN 1563893746), won the Comics Buyer's Guide Fan Award for Favorite Reprint Graphic Album in 2000.

== In other media ==
Paul Kirk / Manhunter appears in the Beware the Batman episode "Unique", voiced by Xander Berkeley. This version is an old friend of Thomas Wayne who was wounded and left for dead during a mission. The Council found him and put him in suspended animation for twenty years, intending to create an army of robot clones. Council scientist Dr. Spangle discovered Mykros' plan to overthrow the world's governments, freed Kirk, and gave him a weapon, after which he set out to take down the clones. When Mykros and the clones kidnap his daughter, Ava, in Gotham City, he gets help from Batman, Katana, and Alfred Pennyworth to rescue her. The heroes defeat Mykros, but Kirk leaves Ava behind to continue taking down the Council and the remaining clones.
