= Star Slammers =

American comic book series by Walt Simonson

- Star Slammers #1, Malibu Comics (May 1994)

Publication information
- Publisher: Marvel Comics; Malibu Comics; Dark Horse Comics; IDW Publishing
- Format: Graphic novel (Marvel); Limited series (Malibu); One-shot (Dark Horse)
- Genre: Science fiction
- No. of issues: 1 (Marvel Comics); 4 (Malibu Comics); 1 (Dark Horse Comics); 8 (reprints, IDW)

Creative team
- Created by: Walt Simonson
- Written by: Walt Simonson
- Artist: Walt Simonson

Collected editions
- The Complete Collection: ISBN 1631402307

Star Slammers is an American comic book series written and drawn by Walt Simonson. A science fiction story about a group of mercenaries, the series was Simonson's first foray into comics and led to his getting professional work in the comic book industry. Simonson revisited Star Slammers throughout his career, publishing it through various publishers over the decades, including Marvel Comics, Malibu Comics, Dark Horse Comics, and IDW Publishing.

Within the Marvel Comics Multiverse, the Star Slammers reality is designated as Earth-83480.

== Overview ==
The Star Slammers, as described by Simonson, are "a Spartan military organization that keeps itself going through the discipline of military life"; they are "a race of men who could out-shoot, out-fight, and out-kill anybody. They [are] paid fabulous sums to act as mercenaries".

Simonson's influences for the Star Slammers were Cordwainer Smith's Instrumentality of Mankind series, Robert A. Heinlein's Future History series, and, to some extent, J. R. R. Tolkien's The Lord of the Rings.

The first Star Slammers graphic novel, published by Marvel in 1983, takes place a thousand years before the events of Star Slammers #1, published by Malibu/Bravura, in 1994.

== Publication history ==
The series began after Simonson joined the Washington Science Fiction Association (WSFA) after graduating from Amherst College in the early 1970s with a Geology degree. As part of the group's bid to host the 1974 World Science Fiction Convention (Discon II), Simonson created what would become Star Slammers, which the WSFA published as a series of ashcan promotional 5.5" x 8.5" b&w chapter booklets printed and distributed at various conventions in the period 1971–1973, with each six-page episode appearing every three to four months. The final chapter appeared in time for the 1972 WSFC that saw WSFA win the vote.

Meanwhile, Simonson had enrolled as an art major at the Rhode Island School of Design, graduating in 1972. The 50-page black-and-white book The Star Slammers became his final thesis. Simonson rated the early part of the work as "pretty good fan art" which, by the end, had become "marginally professional", so he bound the second half of the story into one volume and used it as his portfolio. Carmine Infantino, who was the editor-in-chief at DC Comics, saw this portfolio and got Simonson bits of work at DC; six months later, editor Archie Goodwin gave him his breakthrough—drawing "Manhunter", a backup feature in DC's Detective Comics written by Goodwin.

The first Star Slammers title was published by Marvel Comics as Marvel Graphic Novel No. 6 in 1983, and later in 1994 a new five-issue limited series by Malibu Comics' Bravura imprint, though only four issues out of five were published. Dark Horse Comics published the final issue as a one-shot special in 1996. Dark Horse also published an 8-page Star Slammers story titled "Fever Dream" in Dark Horse Presents #114 (1996) that is a prelude to the 1994 Malibu series.

In 2014 IDW Publishing republished the Marvel and Malibu material in an eight-issue reprint limited series, with the initial 60-page graphic novel broken down into the first three issues for which he created new covers and introductory pages.

Simonson has said that he has plotted out another eight-part Star Slammers story that he would like to get around to when he is less busy. The series was re-colored by Len O'Grady because "the second series was at the dawn of the age of digital color and, to be frank, left a lot to be desired and had dated hard over the intervening twenty years" and Simonson has said: "It's a director's cut in terms of the color. The original was largely colored by my wife and me. The '90s series were colored by digital means. It was all over the map".

== Collected editions ==
The remastered series from IDW has been collected into a single volume:

- Star Slammers: The Complete Collection (IDW Publishing, hardcover, 300 pages, May 2015, ISBN 978-1-63140-230-2)
