= Skyrocket (disambiguation) =

Skyrocket may refer to:

- Bottle rockets, sometimes referred to as "skyrockets" (noun)
- Skyrocket, a common name for the flowering plant Ipomopsis aggregata
- Grumman XF5F Skyrocket, an airplane
- Skyrocket (character), a fictional superhero
- Douglas D-558-2 Skyrocket, another airplane
- Skyrocket!, a band from Austin, Texas featuring Johnny Goudie and Trish Murphy
