= List of DC Comics characters: D =

== Damage ==
Damage is the name of two characters appearing in American comic books published by DC Comics.

== Damien Darhk ==
Damien Darhk is an elusive and dangerous criminal mastermind and enemy of the Teen Titans. He makes his first appearance in Titans #1 (March 1999). Claiming to be a major player in the American underworld and implying he has an army at his disposal, Darhk is shown to be well-established and well-connected and has remained untouchable by the FBI and the CIA.

He appears to have some connection to the crime syndicate H.I.V.E. and has access to unique high-tech equipment unknown to any organization. Darhk uses trickery and forgotten science to make his followers and the public believe he has magical powers, but is later proven to be a fraud.

=== Damien Darhk in other media ===
- Damien Darkh appears as a character summon in Scribblenauts Unmasked: A DC Comics Adventure.
- Damien Darhk appears in media set in the Arrowverse, portrayed by Neal McDonough.
  - Introduced in Arrow, this version is a ruthless yet honorable friend-turned-rival of Ra's al Ghul and a renegade member of the League of Assassins who left after being denied leadership and formed H.I.V.E. Additionally, he acquired a magical artifact called the Khushu Idol, which grants telekinesis and the ability to drain life energy through physical contact. After Anarky kills his wife and destroys the "Ark" in which he and H.I.V.E. planned to survive the nuclear holocaust they wanted to cause, Darkh becomes nihilistic and maintains his attempt to destroy the world until Queen, his team, Mr. Terrific, and the Calculator disable all but one of H.I.V.E.'s nuclear bombs and rally Star City's citizens against him, with the outpouring of hope negating Darkh's powers. He is subsequently killed by Queen in a final battle.
  - A past and present day version of Darhk appears in Legends of Tomorrow.
  - An alternate timeline version of Darkh appears in The Flash episode "Armageddon".

== Dark Arrow ==
Dark Arrow is an alias used by characters appearing in American comic books published by DC Comics as a counterpart of Green Arrow and Red Arrow.

=== Roy McQueen ===
A different version, Roy McQueen, was created by James Robinson and Nicola Scott, and first appeared in Earth 2 #14 (September 2013). He is an archer with partial enhancement who is part of the World Army while known as Connor Hawke.

=== Dark Arrow in other media ===
An original incarnation of Dark Arrow appears in the Arrowverse crossover "Crisis on Earth-X", portrayed by Stephen Amell. This version is the Earth-X counterpart of Oliver Queen and the Führer of a reality where the Nazis achieved world domination.

== Dark Flash ==
The Dark Flash is a character appearing in American comic books published by DC Comics. He is a counterpart of the Flash.

Walter West was created by Mark Waid and Paul Pelletier, and first appeared in The Flash (vol. 2) #150 (July 1999). Appearing in the main DC universe in recognition of Wally West's sacrifice, he is from another reality within Hypertime who was unable to save his loved ones from death at Kobra's hands. After his presence in the main DC Universe starts to cause other realities in Hypertime to bleed over into the main one, the Dark Flash is forced by Superman and Wonder Woman to transverse Hypertime and return home. The Dark Flash leaves the main DC Universe, but seems to go from reality to reality with no success. The Dark Flash was among the speedsters who help to fight Professor Zoom and the Legion of Zoom.

=== Dark Flash in other media ===
- The Walter West incarnation of Dark Flash appears in Justice League Heroes as an alternate costume for Wally West.
- Two original incarnations of the Dark Flash appear in The Flash (2014).
  - Barry Allen appears as Dark Flash in the sixth season two-part episode "The Last Temptation of Barry Allen", where he is corrupted by Ramsey Rosso / Bloodwork.
  - Eobard Thawne appears as Dark Flash in the crossover "Crisis on Earth-X", where he is a general of Earth-X's New Reichsmen.
- An original incarnation of the Dark Flash appears in The Flash (2023) as an alternate version of Barry Allen who continuously reversed time to prevent his reality's destruction.

== Dark Opal ==
Dark Opal is a supervillain appearing in American comic books published by DC Comics.

A powerful sorcerer and scion of the House of Opal on Gemworld, he makes a pact with the Lords of Chaos for greater mystical power and mastery, enabling him to overthrow House Amethyst as the ruling house for decades. During his rule, he fathered numerous children he rejects due to their defects and instead abducts Earth child Carl Nelligan (known on Gemworld as Carnelian) as his adopted son. He also attempted to forge a breastplate with slivers of each house gems of the royal houses of Gemworld, increasing his powers. He is eventually defeated and de-posed by Amethyst alongside an alliance of the royal houses.

=== Dark Opal in other media ===
- Dark Opal appears in DC Nation Shorts' Amethyst, Princess of Gemworld, voiced by Eric Bauza.
- Dark Opal appears in DC Super Hero Girls: Hero of the Year, voiced by Sean Schemmel.

== Phil Darnell ==
Colonel (later General) Phil Darnell is a character appearing in American comic books published by DC Comics. He was Steve Trevor's superior during World War II involving the Military Intelligence and also hired Diana Prince as a secretary.

=== Phil Darnell in other media ===
- A variation of General Phil Darnell, renamed General Phil Blankenship, appears in the first season of Wonder Woman, portrayed by John Randolph and Richard Eastham.
- Colonel Darnell appears in Wonder Woman, portrayed by Steffan Rhodri.

== Dawur ==
Dawur is a character appearing in American comic books published by DC Comics. The character, created by John Rogers and Rafael Albuquerque, first appeared in Blue Beetle vol. 7 #13 (May 2007). He is the commander of the Reach.

== Deadeye ==
Deadeye is an alias utilized by several characters appearing in American comic books published by DC Comics.

=== Earth-3 version ===
Two versions of the character appear in stories involving Earth-3.

The first is an unnamed archer (created by Mark Waid and Rod Whigham, and first appeared in Justice League Quarterly #8 (September 1992)) from the Antimatter Universe who is a reserve member of the Crime Syndicate.

The second is this reality's counterpart of Oliver Queen / Green Arrow (also known as Blue Bowman).

=== Archie Waller ===
Archie Waller was created by Chuck Brown and Alitha Martinez, and first appeared in Lazarus Planet: Next Evolution #1 (April 2023). He is a psychic assassin and the nephew of Amanda Waller.

== Deathstorm ==
Deathstorm is a character appearing in American comic books published by DC Comics. The character was created by Geoff Johns and Peter Tomasi. He is a counterpart of Firestorm, and an enemy of Ronnie Raymond, Jason Rusch, and Martin Stein.

=== Black Lantern version ===
The first incarnation, introduced in Blackest Night, is Ronnie reanimated as a Black Lantern following his death in Identity Crisis until he is fully resurrected, erasing the Black Lantern persona. In Brightest Day, Black Lantern energy combined with the Firestorm matrix recreates Ronnie's Black Lantern persona as a separate entity called Deathstorm. Deathstorm intends to use the emotional instability between Ronnie and Jason so the Firestorm matrix will trigger a Big Bang-level event to destroy all life in the universe. Deathstorm attempts to kill Jason and Ronnie, but Martin takes the attack and dies. The Life Entity unleashes a burst of white energy that destroys Deathstorm.

=== Earth-3 version ===
Earth-Three's equivalent of Deathstorm is Martin Stein, who experimented on himself and corpses. In Forever Evil, Deathstorm joins the Crime Syndicate until he is later killed by Mazahs.

=== Deathstorm in other media ===
- The Ronnie Raymond incarnation of Deathstorm appears as a character summon in Scribblenauts Unmasked: A DC Comics Adventure.
- Two incarnations of Deathstorm appear in The Flash, portrayed by Robbie Amell.
  - An Earth-2 incarnation appears in the episode "Welcome to Earth-2". This version is a doppelgänger of Earth-1 Ronnie Raymond, the significant other of Killer Frost, and an enforcer for Zoom who killed him.
  - The Earth-Prime incarnation, inspired by the Black Lantern incarnation, appears in the eighth season. This version is a cold fusion entity who obtained sentience after Earth-1 Raymond's death. Deathstorm attacks and kills indiscriminately throughout Central City to feed on grief involving deceased loved ones until it is defeated by Hell Frost.
- The Martin Stein incarnation of Deathstorm appears in Lego DC Super-Villains, voiced by Lex Lang.

== Deep Blue ==
- Further reading: Deep Blue at the Comic Book DB (archived from the original); Deep Blue at the Grand Comics Database

Deep Blue is a superhero in the DC Universe. The character was created by Peter David and Jim Calafiore, and first appeared in Aquaman (vol. 3) #23 (August 1996).

Debbie Perkins is the daughter of Tsunami and grew up believing Neptune Perkins to be her father, while Rhombus believed her to be his daughter. As Deep Blue, she is among the heroes who respond to Aquaman's call to unite the undersea kingdoms. Over time, she begins to insist on being called Indigo and learns that Atlan claims to be her true father.

== Demolitia ==
Demolitia is a female vigilante. The character is introduced by David Michelinie and Kieron Dwyer, and first appeared in Action Comics #718 (February 1996).

Demolitia is an anti-corporate vigilante who utilized Bloodsport's technology.

== Devastation ==
Devastation is a character appearing in American comic books published by DC Comics.

The mythological Titan Cronus swallowed almost all of his children, including previously unknown gods named Titan, Oblivion, Disdain, Arch, Slaughter, and Harrier. He did this out of fear that his children would one day dethrone him. Centuries after Zeus successfully accomplished this feat, Cronus released the remaining children who did not escape his bowels. These unknown gods became his new pantheon, which he used to destroy various gods on his new ascension to power. One obstacle Cronus came to know was the champion of Olympus known as Wonder Woman. To defeat Wonder Woman, Cronus devised a plan to create a dark mirror image of her whom he could call as a champion of his own.

Similar to Diana, Cronus formed the image of a child out of Themysciran clay. He breathed life into it and called her Devastation. He then had Titan, Oblivion, Disdain, Arch, Slaughter, and Harrier bless the new creation with evil gifts. Devastation possessed each of Wonder Woman's abilities, but with a dark twist to them.

=== Devastation in other media ===
Devastation appears in Young Justice, voiced by Diane Delano. This version is a member of the Light and Onslaught who later enters a relationship with fellow member Psimon.

== Devilance ==
Devilance was once one of the most respected minions of Darkseid, working as a hunter. Devilance was tapped to track and destroy Darkseid's hated rivals, the Forever People. When he found them on an island in the Pacific Ocean, the Forever People summoned Infinity-Man. Devilance and Infinity-Man engaged in a battle that destroyed the small island they were fighting on. Both of them are presumed dead; although Infinity-Man returns to assist the Forever People, Devilance is not seen again for years. Devilance resurfaces in the 2006 series 52, where he hunts Starfire, Adam Strange and Animal Man on a remote planet where they are stranded.

== Devil Ray ==
Devil Ray is a character who was originally created for the TV series Justice League Unlimited, voiced by Michael Beach, before appearing in the main comics continuity. In the comics, he first appeared in Black Manta #1 (November 2021).

The Justice League Unlimited incarnation of Devil Ray was created because Black Manta and other Aquaman characters were unavailable. He appears as a member of Gorilla Grodd's Secret Society until he is accidentally killed by Deadman possessing Batman's body.

The comic book incarnation of Devil Ray is a human with Atlantean heritage and a former henchman of Black Manta and Human Flame. Having made the Trident of Oricalchum with help from Human Flame's henchmen, he went to Black Manta as he would wield it properly. When Devil Ray was unable to detonate the poison bombs around Atlantis, Black Manta confiscates the Trident of Orichalcum.

== Dex-Starr ==
Dex-Starr is a character appearing in American comic books published by DC Comics. He was created by Shane Davis, and first appeared in the one-shot Final Crisis: Rage of the Red Lanterns (2008).

Dex-Starr was originally a stray blue domestic cat from Earth, adopted by a woman in Brooklyn who names him Dexter. During a break-in, Dex-Starr scratched a burglar before his owner was killed and he was evicted by the police. Homeless, he was grabbed by two street thugs and thrown off the Brooklyn Bridge, but the rage that he felt caught the attention of a red power ring and it came to him before he hit the water. Dexter is inducted into the Red Lantern Corps and kills the thugs. In an interview with Wizard, Geoff Johns described Dex-Starr as "the most sadistic and malicious" of the Red Lanterns. Originally intended as a joke by Davis, Dex-Starr began being featured more prominently due to positive reception.

=== Dex-Starr in other media ===
- Dex-Starr appears in Justice League Action, with vocal effects provided by Jason J. Lewis.
- Dex-Starr appears in DC Super Hero Girls, voiced by Kevin Michael Richardson as a Red Lantern while Fred Tatasciore provides vocal effects. This version previously resided at the Metropolis Animal Shelter and was considered to be euthanized due to his aggressive nature and inability to be adopted. Amidst Jessica Cruz's efforts to do so, Dex-Starr briefly gains a Red Lantern ring before she adopts him. In the episode "#ItsComplicated", Dex-Starr regains his powers and joins Star Sapphire and Sinestro in attacking Cruz and Hal Jordan until Jordan apologizes to the trio.
- Dex-Starr appears in Lego DC Comics Super Heroes: Aquaman – Rage of Atlantis, voiced by Dee Bradley Baker.
- Dex-Starr appears as a character summon in Scribblenauts Unmasked: A DC Comics Adventure.
- Dex-Starr appears as an assist character for Atrocitus in Injustice 2.
- Dex-Starr appears as a playable character in Lego Batman 3: Beyond Gotham and Lego DC Super-Villains, with vocal effects provided again by Dee Bradley Baker.

== Djo Zha ==
Djo Zha is the name of two characters appearing in American comic books published by DC Comics. Hector was created by Keith Giffen, John Rogers and Duncan Rouleau, and first appeared in Blue Beetle vol. 7 #9 (January 2007). The actual Djo Zha was created by Lilah Sturges and Carlo Barberi, and first appeared in Blue Beetle vol. 7 #35 (March 2009).

=== Hector ===
Hector is a technician ally of Jaime Reyes and the brother of Nadia. After Nadia is killed by a group of Reach infiltrators, Hector bonds with Reach technology in order to be an enemy of Jaime.

=== Reach infiltrator ===
The actual Djo Zha is part of a group of Reach infiltrators called the Khaji Da Revolutionary Army, but they are defeated by Blue Beetle.

== Djuba ==
Djuba is a mutated red gorilla who lives in a cave at the top of Mount Kilimanjaro. Mike Maxwell later encounters Djuba after his plane crashes on the mountain. After he defeats Djuba in battle, Djuba gives him a mystic helmet. Djuba is later killed after being infested with anthrax.

=== Djuba in other media ===
- Djuba appears in a flashback in the Batman: The Brave and the Bold episode "The Siege of Starro!". This version was mutated by toxic, polluted water. It fights wrestler Mike Maxwell, who later comes into contact with the same polluted water, defeats Djuba, takes its mask, and becomes B'wana Beast.
- Djuba appears in a flashback in the Titans episode "Dude, Where's My Gar?". This version is a western lowland gorilla and friend of Freedom Beast who Dr. Myers subjected to the Green Plague on the Chief's behalf. Upon finding a dying Djuba, Freedom Beast fused it with Myers to ensure that he would die as well.
- Djuba appears in the Young Justice tie-in comic book. This version is a member of Solovar's troop who was enhanced with Kobra venom by the Brain and Ultra-Humanite.

== Doctor Chaos ==
- First appearance: The New Adventures of Superboy #25 (1982)
- Created by: Martin Pasko (writer); Kurt Schaffenberger (penciler)
- Teams: Lords of Chaos
- Abilities: Access to the artifact known as the "Helmet of Chaos" gants the user magic and spellcasting.

In the Earth-1 universe, Professor Lewis Lang and his assistant Burt Belker discover a helmet in the Valley of Ur in Mesopotamia that is identical to the helmet on Earth-2 except for its blue color. This helmet contains a Lord of Chaos that possesses Burt and turns him into the sorcerer Doctor Chaos, whose costume is identical to Doctor Fate's except for a reversed color scheme. Superboy confronts Doctor Chaos and removes the helmet from Burt, jettisoning it into space.

A new version of Doctor Chaos appears in Justice League of America (2018) as an ally of the Lords of Chaos.

== Doctor Double X ==
Doctor Double X (Simon Ecks) is a scientist who discovers that human auras can be enhanced to function outside of the body. When Ecks creates an energy-duplicate of himself, his mind becomes dominated by the doppelgänger which he names Double X. He battles Batman and Robin. The resulting battle causes Ecks to lose his memory of the experience, after which he is remanded to Arkham Asylum.

In "The New 52" continuity reboot, Simon Ecks is a physician at Arkham Asylum. Doctor Double X's energy duplicate is depicted as a Tulpa.

=== Doctor Double X in other media ===
- Doctor Double X appears in Batman: The Brave and the Bold, voiced by Ron Perlman.
- Simon Ecks appears in Young Justice, voiced by Troy Baker. This version is a geneticist with the ability to clone himself who works for Baron Bedlam and participates in his metahuman trafficking operation.
- Doctor Double X makes a non-speaking appearance in Scooby-Doo! & Batman: The Brave and the Bold.

== Doctor Impossible ==
- First appearance: Justice League of America (vol. 2) #1 (October 2006)
- Created by: Brad Meltzer, Ed Benes
- Species: New God
- Abilities: Escape artist; Superior intellect; Superhuman strength, speed, stamina & reflexes; Technology expert; Master hand-to-hand combat; Father Box
- Aliases: Jonas Lock
- Further reading: Doctor Impossible at Comic Vine; Doctor Impossible at League of Comic Geeks; Doctor Impossible at DC Database

Doctor Impossible is a supervillain appearing in publications by DC Comics. He first appeared in Justice League of America, vol. 2 #1. The character was created by Brad Meltzer and Ed Benes, being inspired by the concepts of Jack Kirby's Fourth World.

Following his first appearance as Doctor Impossible, a rumor spread among the criminal underground that Impossible was a thug who had previously worked for Penguin. It is postulated that his real name is Jonas Lock (a takeoff of Scott Free) and that he acquired his advanced technology from DeSaad and Apokolips. Impossible makes claims to be the brother of Mister Miracle and to have come from Apokolips. Impossible's costume is a dark purple and black variation of Mister Miracle's colorful yellow and red costume. Impossible uses equipment and skills similar to Mister Miracle.

After his arrival on Earth, Impossible gained mind control of Professor Ivo, Electrocutioner, Plastique, Karate Kid (in the guise of Trident), and Solomon Grundy through a mechanically enhanced Starro parasite. The brainwashed villains were used to gather raw materials for the construction of a robotic body to hold the mind of Grundy. Doctor Impossible stole the body of Red Tornado, decapitated two of the Metal Men (Gold and Platinum) and seized the arm of the Parasite. He plan was foiled as he was defeated by members of the Justice League.

Impossible returned, accompanied by evil duplicates of several New Gods, consisting of Neon Black (Lightray), Hunter (Orion), Chair (Metron), and Tender Mercy (Big Barda), with a plan to seize an alien machine that was buried on Earth for eons. He and his team were powerful enough to defeat Josiah Power and his team, the Power Company, in combat. They are later seen breaking into the Justice League Watchtower to steal alien artifacts. After successfully stealing the artifacts, the villains are ambushed by the newly arrived Green Arrow, who is on the run after killing Prometheus. Impossible and his partners are eventually forced to flee after a damaged Red Tornado uses his headless body to attack them. Impossible combines the stolen artifacts and creates an advanced machine. He places the kidnapped Justice League Europe member Blue Jay inside of it. This opens up a gateway to the multiverse, which Impossible claims to be doing at the behest of an unnamed client.

Afterward, Doctor Impossible determines that the Crime Syndicate of America (CSA), evil versions of the Justice League, is planning to resurrect Alexander Luthor Jr. in the Chamber of Resurrection. Impossible and the CSA arrive on New Earth to attack the Justice League of America (JLA) in their headquarters, the Hall of Justice. While the other CSA members keep the JLA busy, the supervillain Owlman sneaks off to allow Impossible access to the resurrection device. At the last moment, Impossible double-crosses the CSA and has Hunter remove Luthor's corpse and substitute himself to resurrect Darkseid. The resurrection machine destroys Hunter, as a character appears within the smoke of the containment device. Impossible then exults to his team that Darkseid has returned. However, the being before them is Omega Man, an inter-dimensional being that feeds on the Multiverse itself. Omega Man blasts Neon Black and Tender Mercy, killing them instantly. Impossible flees, realizing that neither Darkseid nor any New God could help him.

Sometime later, Impossible is hired by Doctor Sivana to build the Methuselah Device that can either make a man immortal or resurrect the dead. Sivana wants to use it for Deathstroke to heal his son Jericho and his Titans team. The device is destroyed by other members of the Titans and Impossible refuses to rebuild it, claiming it is an abomination.

=== Equipment and abilities of Doctor Impossible ===
While Mister Miracle is aided by his benevolent Mother Box and uses Boom Tubes to travel from place to place, Doctor Impossible uses a Father Box and "Hush Tubes." Though Father Boxes have been featured in other stories as Apokoliptian technology that was based on the Mother Box, "Hush Tubes," however, have not been explained or utilized in any other stories.

== Doctor Leviticus ==
Doctor Leviticus is a character appearing in American comic books published by DC Comics.

An unknown woman used the name of Doctor Leviticus to experiment on electrum which would later be used in the Talon experiments of her group the Court of Owls.

=== Doctor Leviticus in other media ===
A variation of Doctor Leviticus named Rebekah Leviticus, also known as Rebecca March, appears in Gotham Knights, portrayed by Lauren Stamile. This version is Lincoln March's wife, mother of Brody March, and the leader of the Court of Owls.

== Doctor Moon ==
Doctor Moon is a criminal neurosurgeon who sells his services to other villains that require his unethical skills of body modifications, psychological conditions, and torture. Moon was first seen in the Pre-Crisis as a member of the League of Assassins. Ra's al Ghul wanted him to reanimate a brain of a corpse so that he can interrogate only for that plan to be foiled by Batman. Moon is later killed by Manhunter who stabs him with a scalpel.

=== Doctor Moon in other media ===
- Doctor Moon appears in the Justice League Unlimited episode "Question Authority", voiced by an uncredited Jeffrey Combs. This version is a member of Project Cadmus.
- Doctor Moon Dae-il appears in Young Justice, voiced by Vic Chao.
- Doctor Moon appears in the Teen Titans Go! episode "Moonlighting", voiced by James Sie.

== Doctor No-Face ==
- Further reading: Doctor No-Face at the Grand Comics Database

Doctor No-Face is a supervillain in the DC Universe.

The character, created by Dave Wood and Sheldon Moldoff, only appeared in Detective Comics #319 (September 1963).

Bart Magan attempts to remove a facial scar using an experimental device. When the device erases all of his facial features instead, he takes the name "Doctor No-Face" and starts a short-lived crime spree in Gotham City.

=== Doctor No-Face in other media ===
Doctor No-Face appears in the Batman: The Brave and the Bold episode "A Bat Divided!".

== Doctor Thirteen ==
Dr. Terrance Thirteen (sometimes Terrence) is a character in comic books set in the DC Universe. The character's first published appearance is in Star Spangled Comics #122 (November 1951). This continued from issue #122–130 (November 1951–July 1952). The feature then moved to House of Mystery and was canceled after issue #7. The character was created by an unknown writer with artist Leonard Starr.

== Doctor Trap ==
Doctor Trap (Lawrence Trapp) is a supervillain with a mechanical jaw and enemy of the Justice Experience, the Martian Manhunter, and Cameron Chase. Created by Dan Curtis Johnson and J. H. Williams III, he first appeared in Chase #3 (April 1998).

=== Doctor Trap in other media ===
Doctor Trap appears in Harley Quinn, voiced by Alan Tudyk. This version is a member of the Legion of Doom.

== Doctor Tyme ==
Doctor Tyme (Percival Sutter) is a character appearing in American comic books published by DC Comics. Created by Arnold Drake and Bruno Premiani, he first appeared in Doom Patrol #92 (December 1964).

Doctor Tyme is a criminal who wields a ray that enables him to manipulate and freeze time.

In "52", Doctor Tyme appears as a member of the Science Squad.

=== Doctor Tyme in other media ===
- Doctor Tyme makes a cameo appearance in a flashback in the Batman: The Brave and the Bold episode "The Last Patrol!".
- Doctor Tyme appears in Doom Patrol, portrayed by Brandon Perea and voiced by Dan Martin.
- Doctor Tyme appears in Super Friends #24 as a member of W.O.R.M.S., a group of mad scientists led by Lex Luthor.

== Dodger ==
Dodger is a thief who deals in high-end merchandise. Operating from London, England, Dodger will steal or sell anything from information to advanced technology.

At one point he came into possession of what appeared to be an alien spacecraft. Recognizing that the vehicle's stealth capabilities made it a lucrative commodity, he began leasing the vessel to various underworld figures, including the League of Assassins. When the vessel in question was linked to an assassination attempt against Connor Hawke, Green Arrow, and Black Canary began investigating its activity. The trail led them to London where they (along with Mia Dearden) engaged in combat with Dodger at a local pub. Although Dodger proved to be an able-bodied physical combatant, "Team Arrow" subdued him and he told them about the League of Assassins.

When pressed for more information, Dodger was unwilling to cooperate, so the Green Arrow and the Black Canary dropped him from the belly of a cargo plane suspended by a bungee cord until he agreed to give them better intelligence. He took them to his secret lair and triangulated the last location of the stealth ship he had leased.

Green Arrow and Black Canary then persuaded him to accompany them on the search, which brought them to a castle in Leichestershire, England. They evaded several traps and finally discovered a cryogenics tube containing Plastic Man.

Dodger continued to work alongside "Team Arrow" and fought a team of metahumans who claimed to represent the League of Assassins. Dodger contributed little to the battle; however, he did manage to distract one of them long enough for Batman to subdue him. Dodger continued adventuring with the group, battled foes and completed the adventure along with the team.

After settling their business with the League of Assassins, Dodger accompanied "Team Arrow" back to the United States, where he struck up a romantic relationship with Mia Dearden. Mia has now left the States and traveled to London to continue this relationship.

=== Dodger in other media ===
- Dodger appears in a self-titled episode of Arrow, portrayed by James Callis. This version is Winnick Norton, a British jewel thief who wields a stun stick and employs hostages with bomb collars to steal for him. He is defeated by Oliver Queen and John Diggle and arrested by the Starling City Police Department.
- The Arrow incarnation of Dodger appears in the non-canonical tie-in comic Arrow: Season 2.5. After escaping from prison, he moves to Blüdhaven and joins a mercenary group called the Renegades. Under Clinton Hogue's orders, they kidnap Felicity Smoak, but are defeated by Queen, Roy Harper and Helena Bertinelli who leave them for the police.

== Dominus ==
Dominus is a character and a DC Comics supervillain who first appeared in Action Comics #747. He appears primarily as an opponent of Superman.

Originally, Dominus was an alien priest named Tuoni, who served as one of the five custodians of his world's faith. During this time, he fell in love with his peer, Ahti. However, he was driven mad by jealousy when Ahti ascended past him and assumed the mantle of Kismet, Illuminator of All Realities.

Studying infernal forbidden magic in an attempt to gain the power to challenge his former lover and rob her of the power of Kismet, Tuoni's assault was reflected by Kismet's divine energies and his body was incinerated. Despite Tuoni's deceit, the omnibenevolent Kismet showed him mercy and shunted his shattered, still-living body into the Phantom Zone.

Within the Phantom Zone, Tuoni encountered a holographic projection of Superman's long-dead Kryptonian ancestor, Kem-L, who was able to use arcane Kryptonian science to rebuild the former holy man as a psionic cosmic phantasm known as "Dominus".

In this new all-powerful form, Dominus escaped the Zone via Superman's Fortress of Solitude and attacked Earth. Attempting to find Kismet to steal her cosmic powers, he was opposed by Superman. Swearing vengeance, Dominus telepathically entered Superman's mind and preyed on one of Superman's greatest weaknesses; his fear of failing the people of Earth.

Using mind control, Dominus convinced Superman to take control of Earth and build the Superman robots to police the planet at all times. In another battle, Dominus used his reality-warping powers to become Superman, using the Superman robots to search for Kismet while Superman was disguised as one of his own robots and later as Dominus.

During his captivity in these other forms Superman improved on his use of Torquasm Vo, an ancient Kryptonian warrior discipline technique where the warrior can control what they think. Superman and Dominus engage in a mental-physical battle with Dominus using any stray thought of Superman to reshape reality. The battle ends with Superman banishing Dominus to the Phantom Zone.

== Dabney Donovan ==
- First appearance: Superman's Pal, Jimmy Olsen #142 (October 1971)
- Created by: Jack Kirby
- Teams: Project Cadmus, Intergang
- Further reading: Dabney Donovan at Comic Vine; Dabney Donovan at League of Comic Geeks; Dabney Donovan at DC Database

Dabney Donovan is a genetic scientist who founded Project Cadmus with Reginald Augustine and Thomas Thompkins. Donovan was ultimately fired from the Project because he felt there should never be limits in understanding the potential of the genetic code. Donovan is accredited for the non-human creations of the Project, referred to as "DNAliens".

During the "Fall of Metropolis" storyline, Dabney Donovan is revealed to be the creator of the Underworlders and the true mastermind behind the clone virus. Donovan later murders Paul Westfield and cuts off one of his ears as a trophy.

After the death of his clone and the defeat of Dragorin and Lupek, Donovan finds Moxie Mannheim badly injured. Donovan creates youthful clone bodies for Mannheim and his dead henchmen Ginny McCree, Mike Gunn, Noose, and Rough House, who also gain superpowers.

Superman finds that Dabney Donovan had escaped from Project Cadmus custody when he found a Mandragore monster near Transilvane. Both of them travel to Transilvane and learn that it has been divided among the different monsters that live there. Superman makes a deal with Dragorin to withdraw the Mandragore from Earth in exchange for Donovan sparing Transilvane's residents. Dragorin agrees as Superman returns to Earth and hands over Donovan to Cadmus custody.

=== Dabney Donovan in other media ===
- A variation of Dabney Donovan appears in Young Justice, voiced by Phil LaMarr. This version is a human disguise utilized by Dubbilex.
- Dabney Donovan appears in Superman & Lois, portrayed by Robel Zere. This version is a physician, scientist, and former MIT student who assists Morgan Edge in his experiments involving the Eradicator and X-Kryptonite, having discovered the latter in Europe.
- Dabney Donovan appears in the DC Animated Movie Universe (DCAMU) films The Death of Superman and Reign of the Supermen, voiced by Trevor Devall. This version is a LexCorp employee who formerly worked for Project Cadmus and specializes in bio-engineering. Lex Luthor tasks Donovan with creating an army of Superman clones, but kills him after he gives information to Lois Lane.
- Dabney Donovan appears in DC Universe Online. This version is an associate of the Legion of Doom and vendor in the Hall of Doom's Meta Wing.

== Double Dare ==
Double Dare are a group of characters appearing in American comic books published by DC Comics. They were created by Chuck Dixon and Scott McDaniel.

Introduced in the pages of Nightwing, Aliki and Margot Marceau are two female French Cirque acrobats and thieves operating in Blüdhaven. Hired by mob boss Blockbuster, they encounter Dick Grayson and form a tenuous alliance with him after being betrayed by Blockbuster.

They later join the new expansive Secret Society led by Alexander Luthor Jr. during Infinite Crisis. In Villains United, the twins encounter the Secret Six.

=== Double Dare in other media ===
- Double Dare appear as character summons in Scribblenauts Unmasked: A DC Comics Adventure.
- Double Dare appear in DC Super Hero Girls, both voiced by Lauren Tom.

== Double Down ==
Double Down is a character appearing in American comic books published by DC Comics. He was introduced in The Flash: Iron Heights by Geoff Johns and Ethan Van Sciver.

A con man and compulsive gambler, Jeremy Tell gained his powers following a card game in which he lost. Incensed, he attacked and killed the man who had beaten him. The man had in his possession a cursed deck of cards, which bonded to Tell's flesh and burned off much of his skin. The cards now act as the top layer of his skin, and can be wielded as weapons.

=== Double Down in other media ===
- Jeremy Tell / Double Down appears in the Arrow episode "Restoration", portrayed by JR Bourne. This version acquired his powers from the explosion of Harrison Wells' particle accelerator, gaining the ability to manifest physical cards from his tattoos and utilize them as weapons.
- Double Down makes a cameo appearance in The Suicide Squad, portrayed by Jared Gore. This version is an inmate of Belle Reve Penitentiary.
- Double Down appears as a character summon in Scribblenauts Unmasked: A DC Comics Adventure.

== Bernard Dowd ==
Bernard Dowd is a character appearing in American comic books published by DC Comics.

Bernard Dowd is Tim Drake's former classmate, and they reconnected, only for Bernard to be kidnapped. As Robin, Tim went on a rescue, where Bernard told Robin that Tim helped him come out, unaware that Robin and Tim were one and the same. This revelation made Tim to realize his own identity as a bisexual man. Tim and Bernard eventually start dating.

=== Bernard Dowd in other media ===
A character based on Bernard Dowd named Bernard Fitzmartin appears in Titans, portrayed by James Scully. He is the Director of Special Projects at S.T.A.R. Labs, who becomes the boyfriend of Tim Drake.

== Draaga ==
Draaga is an alien character in the DC Comics universe. He first appeared in The Adventures of Superman #454 (May 1989), and was created by Jerry Ordway, Roger Stern, and George Pérez.

In the "Superman in Exile" storyline, Superman exiles himself from Earth and is forced to participate in Mongul's gladiatorial games. During this time, he fights reigning champion Draaga who is chosen to lead Warworld following Mongul's defeat.

Draaga returns in the "Panic in the Sky" storyline, where Maxima hires him to destroy Superman. Draaga joins Superman in the fight against Brainiac to regain his honor and is killed by an anti-matter doomsday device.

=== Draaga in other media ===
- Draaga appears in the Justice League episode "War World", voiced by William Smith.
- Draaga appears in the Supergirl episode "Survivors", portrayed by John DeSantis. This version is a combatant in Roulette's underground fight club in National City.
- Draaga appears as a character summon in Scribblenauts Unmasked: A DC Comics Adventure.
- Draaga appears in Young Justice #20.

== Dracula ==
Dracula is a character appearing in American comic books published by DC Comics. He is based on the vampire Count Dracula from the Bram Stoker book Dracula.

Clark Kent, Lois Lane, and Jimmy Olsen once stayed at the castle of Count Rominoff to do a story. When Lois is attacked by werewolves and saved by Superman, she runs into Rominoff and discover that he is actually Count Dracula. He revealed his plan to bring Lois to Transylvania so that he can lure out Superman and turn him into a vampire. After messing with Superman with what transpired during the Imperiex War, Dracula finally bites into Superman's neck. However, Dracula is disintegrated by Superman's blood, which contains solar energy. Superman loses all memory of this encounter.

Issue #14 of the third Shazam comics series revealed that a version of Dracula lives in the Darklands. The Shazam Family previously assisted the Ghost Patrol in fighting him.

=== Elseworlds' Dracula ===
A variant of Dracula appears in Elseworlds' Batman & Dracula trilogy. Batman finds that Dracula and his family of vampires have been committing murders throughout Gotham City. After Batman destroyed Wayne Manor to kill of Dracula's vampires, Batman confronts Dracula. Upon draining Batman of his blood, Dracula was impaled by a wooden utility pole. This victory cost Batman his humanity as he becomes a vampire. Joker later takes control of Dracula's remaining vampires.

=== Dracula in other media ===
- Dracula appears in the Challenge of the Superfriends episode "Attack of the Vampire", voiced by Bob Holt.
- Dracula appears in The Batman vs. Dracula, voiced by Peter Stormare. Penguin stumbles upon Dracula's grave while hiding from Batman, where blood from his cut hand falls onto Dracula's skeleton and reanimates him. Dracula hypnotizes Penguin into serving him and takes an interest in Vicki Vale, planning to resurrect Carmilla Karnstein in her body. After thwarting the ritual to revive Carmilla, Batman lures Dracula into the Batcave and uses a prototype solar energy-storing machine to vanquish him.
- The Batman incarnation of Dracula appears in The Batman Strikes! #15.

== Dragon King ==
Dragon King is a character from DC Comics. He was created by Roy Thomas and Rich Buckler, and first appeared in All-Star Squadron #4, in December 1981.

The man known as "Dragon King" was a high-ranking official and scientist in the Japanese government during World War II, who created the nerve gas K887. He obtained the mythical Holy Grail for Japan, and was able to combine it with Adolf Hitler's Spear of Destiny, which had been loaned to Hideki Tojo. With the two items, the Dragon King and Hitler created a field of arcane magic that shielded imperial Japan and Fortress Europa from attack. The field ensured that any hero with magic-based powers, or a vulnerability to magic (like Superman), would instantly be converted to the Axis cause, keeping some of the allies' most powerful heroes out of the theatre of war. Some heroes were temporarily able to circumvent this for humanitarian missions, despite the Dragon King's best efforts. After Japan's surrender on August 15, 1945, the Dragon King went into hiding and experimented with combining his own genetic material with that of a lizard. He eventually succeeded in making himself a hybrid of human and reptile.

In more recent history (in modern age), the Dragon King resurfaced in Blue Valley, Nebraska, with a daughter named Cindy Burman, now the villainess Shiv. While making use of a robot that operated as Principal Sherman at Blue Valley High School, Dragon King is served by Paintball, Skeeter, and Stunt. He clashed against the second Star-Spangled Kid, Courtney Whitmore alias Star-Girl, her sidekick S.T.R.I.P.E., and the Shining Knight, while the latter was on a quest to reclaim the Holy Grail. It is strongly implied during this confrontation that the Dragon King had in the past murdered Sir Justin's wife Firebrand. During this fight, the Dragon King himself was defeated and apparently killed by the Shining Knight, although his body was never found.

He later resurfaces with the Spear of Destiny in his possession and attempts to raise an army of super-powered soldiers, but is defeated by the Justice Society of America.

=== Dragon King in other media ===
- Dragon King makes a cameo appearance in a flashback in the Young Justice episode "Humanity".
- Dragon King appears as a character summon in Scribblenauts Unmasked: A DC Comics Adventure.
- Dragon King appears in Stargirl, portrayed by Nelson Lee. This version is Shiro Ito, an Imperial Japanese war criminal from World War II who was supposedly executed for his work with biological weapons. Having survived to the present day and acquired reptilian scales, he hides his identity with an elaborate costume, experiments on himself and his patients, and joined the Injustice Society of America (ISA). Throughout the first season, he assists the ISA in their plot to enact "Project: New America" while monitoring Brainwave's son Henry King Jr. for burgeoning powers by forcing his daughter Cindy Burman to date the latter. By the season finale, Ito is fatally wounded by Burman. As of the third season, he had transplanted his brain into the body of Ultra-Humanite, who in turn transplanted his into that of Starman as part of Icicle's plot to have "Starman" and Icicle's son Cameron defeat Ito to prove their worth as heroes. While fighting the Justice Society of America (JSA), Ito is turned into a plush toy by Jakeem Williams and Thunderbolt.

== Dragorin ==
Dragorin is a character appearing in American comic books published by DC Comics.

Dragorin is a vampire-like DNAlien from the artificial planet Transilvane. He and the werewolf-like Lupek are first seen looking for their creator Dabney Donovan, during which they encounter Superman and Jimmy Olsen. Both of them later find Transilvane in an abandoned graveyard as they learned from Dragorin, Lupek, and the DNAliens of a "Demon Dog" that threatens their planet. Superman is able to thwart the "Demon Dog", which is revealed to be a device with chemical defoliants in it. Afterwards, Dragorin and his fellow monsters return to Transilvane.

== Carl Draper ==
Carl Draper is a character in DC Comics, an enemy of Superman. Draper made his first appearance in Superman #331 (January 1979), written by Martin Pasko and drawn by Curt Swan and Frank Chiaramonte.

In pre-Crisis comics, Carl Draper grew up in Smallville. Draper was an overweight clumsy teenager whom most of the other kids never noticed or made fun of and was in love with Lana Lang, who had eyes only for Superboy, much to Draper's resentment. As an adult, Draper underwent a self-imposed self-improvement regimen, including exercise and cosmetic surgery, to overcome his physical shortcomings. He became an expert locksmith and architect, designing an inescapable prison for supervillains called "Mount Olympus". Impressed by the achievement, Superman augmented the prison's security by placing it on an antigravity platform. Initially dubbed "Draper's Island" by Superman, it was informally renamed "Superman Island" by the adult Lana—with whom Draper remained smitten, just as she remained lovestruck by Superman. It was the latter name, plus the novelty of the floating platform, that caught public attention, diverting recognition from Draper himself. This proved the final straw for Draper, who snapped and became the costumed supervillain the Master Jailer. He attacked Superman and kidnapped Lana under that name. Superman defeated him and he was sent to his own prison.

In post-Crisis comics, Carl Draper first appeared in The Adventures of Superman #517 (November 1994). This was during the "Dead Again" storyline, when Superman was suspected of being an impostor after his body was found still in his tomb (from The Death of Superman storyline). Draper was hired by S.T.A.R. Labs to design a holding cell for Conduit, when his daughter, Carla, asked him if he could build a prison that could hold even Superman. Draper initially designed a trap that only the real Superman could escape from, explaining this to Superman by way of a hologram of a costumed figure named Deathtrap. When Superman escaped the trap, Draper became obsessed with proving that he could capture the real thing. This version of Draper was dressed in casual wear, only getting an updated costume with chain-based attacks later.

In Action Comics #739, Superman (in his blue energy form) was captured in an "energy hobble" by Deathtrap, now calling himself Locksmith. At the end of the story, it was revealed to the reader that his daughter, Carla Draper, was running the hologram this time and that her father was unaware of this. The now-costumed Master Jailer was one of the villains along with Neutron controlled by Manchester Black in the 2002 storyline "Ending Battle"; however, it was not clear that it was, in fact, Draper.

Carl Draper appears in Checkmate #17 (October 2007). At some point, Checkmate discovered his multiple identities and used this to force him into becoming a security consultant, protecting Checkmate itself from attack. In the issue, he prevents numerous assaults on Checkmate headquarters and is promoted to head of security with the title Castellan.

A DC Rebirth version of the Master Jailer appears in the Aquaman/Suicide Squad crossover "Sinking Atlantis" as a member of the Squad. Aspects of his pre- and Post-Crisis history are present, with Carl growing up in Smallville and having a daughter.

=== Carl Draper in other media ===
- The Master Jailer appears as a character summon in Scribblenauts Unmasked: A DC Comics Adventure.
- The Master Jailer appears in Supergirl, portrayed by Jeff Branson. This version is an alien from the planet Trombus and a guard at the Kryptonian prison Fort Rozz until the prison ship landed on Earth and many of the inmates escaped. He turned vigilante, hunting down and lynching several escapees until he was thwarted by Kara. Additionally, on Earth, he posed as Detective Draper of the National City Police Department.

== Carla Draper ==
Carla Draper is the daughter of Carl Draper who made an appearance in Superboy (vol. 4) #26 (May 1996) under the name Snare. She responded to a request from the Hawaiian Special Crimes Unit to Draper Security for assistance in capturing the supervillain Knockout, who was on the run with a misguided Superboy in tow. Snare, aware of her father's obsession, tried to prove that she could do something that he could not by capturing Superboy. This led to a fight with the SCU, during which Superboy and Knockout escaped.

== Dreadbolt ==
- First appearance: Teen Titans Vol 3 #55 (March, 2008)
- Species: Human
- Teams: Terror Titans
- Abilities: High-tech suit grants: Energy blasts; Fight; Teleporation

Dreadbolt (Terry Bolatinsky) debuted in Teen Titans #55. The son of Larry Boltinsky, the villain known as Bolt, he first attempts to befriend Blue Devil's former sidekick, Kid Devil, before revealing he is following in his father's footsteps as Dreadbolt. He tries to persuade Kid Devil to join his team, the Terror Titans, but when Kid Devil refuses, he joins the rest of the Terror Titans in defeating him. Later, at the request of the new Clock King, he is sent to help defeat Ravager, who already took out Persuader and Copperhead. He threatens to kill Wendy and Marvin, but Ravager calls his bluff and defeats him alone. He regroups with his teammates and attempts to take her down again, but is apparently killed in the ensuing explosion caused by Ravager breaking a gas pipe. He is later revealed to have used the teleportation system in his suit to get himself and his teammates to safety.

In the Terror Titans miniseries, Dreadbolt is tasked by Clock King to kill his father, thereby proving himself worthy to lead his fellow Terror Titans. Clock King then renames him Bolt when he finally does. Disruptor, having lost favor from Clock King to Ravager, tried to manipulate Terry into killing her, but Terry is not fooled. When Clock King sets in motion his plan to destroy Los Angeles with an army of brainwashed metahumans, Ravager sets out to stop him. Bolt and the Terror Titans battled her, only to be outmaneuvered. Miss Martian, who had posed as one of the metahumans, freed the others from their brainwashing, and they came after the Terror Titans. Retreating to Clock King's lair for help, Bolt and the others are aghast to see Clock King kill Disruptor for her failure, and leave them at the mercy of the oncoming metahumans. Bolt offers to hold them off while his teammates get away, but they insist on fighting together and are subdued, with Dreadbolt being defeated by Static. Two weeks later, Bolt and the remaining Terror Titans escape from custody, planning revenge on Clock King.

== Dreadnought ==
The Dreadnought is a character in DC Comics appearing in The New 52 continuity. He serves as an agent of H.I.V.E., along with Psiphon. He appears in Superboy (vol. 4) #20, where he is sent by H.I.V.E. to New York City to apprehend Doctor Psycho, who had escaped from a H.I.V.E. facility, and Superboy, whose psionic powers were of interest to H.I.V.E. The two characters teamed up and managed to defeat H.I.V.E. soldiers. The Dreadnought was sent flying by Superboy and landed in the Hudson River.

== Dream Girl ==
Dream Girl, also called Dreamer, is the name of two characters in DC Comics.

=== Nura Nal ===
The Nura Nal version is primarily as a member of the Legion of Super-Heroes in the 30th and 31st centuries. She was created by writer Edmond Hamilton and artist John Forte, and first appeared in Adventure Comics #317 (1964).

Like all natives of Naltor, Nura has the power to see the future and experience visions in dreams; she is rated one of the most powerful precognitives on the planet. After foreseeing the deaths of several Legionnaires, she crafts an elaborate plan to save their lives. However, the Legionnaires who Nura foresaw dying are revealed to be robot duplicates. Having joined the team under false pretenses, she leaves the Legion temporarily and joins the Legion of Substitute Heroes. In later reboots of the Legion's continuity, Nura returned to the Legion.

=== Dream Girl in other media ===
- The Nura Nal incarnation of Dream Girl makes a non-speaking cameo appearance in the Superman: The Animated Series episode "New Kids in Town".
- The Nura Nal incarnation of Dream Girl appears in Legion of Super Heroes, voiced by Tara Platt.
- The Nura Nal incarnation of Dream Girl appears as a character summon in Scribblenauts Unmasked: A DC Comics Adventure.
- Nura Nal appears in Smallville Season 11.

== Erik Drekken ==
Erik Drekken is a biologist who stumbled upon the evolution paperwork of Emery Zackro. Some time later, Drekken managed to gain control over his DNA, enabling him to evolve and devolve into any lifeform at will. He went on to join the Anti-Superman Army. When Superman returned Drekken to his humanoid form, he warned Superman about the dire future and where the stolen kryptonite is.

== Dubbilex ==
Dubbilex is a character appearing in American comic books published by DC Comics. Created by Jack Kirby, he first appeared in Superman's Pal Jimmy Olsen #136 (March 1971).

Dubbilex is a DNAlien, an artificial, genetically modified human with psychic powers who works as Project Cadmus. Dubbilex becomes close to Superboy (Conner Kent), having aided in his creation by providing mental impressions that he had gained from past encounters with Superman to provide Conner with his '"template"'s memories in the absence of Superman's actual mind. Dubbilex accompanies Conner when he leaves Cadmus and moves to Hawaii.

=== Dubbilex in other media ===
- Dubbilex appears in Young Justice, voiced by Phil LaMarr. This version is the leader of the Genomorphs and a resident of Geranium City.
- Dubbilex appears as a character summon in Scribblenauts Unmasked: A DC Comics Adventure.

== Mickey DuBois ==
Michael "Mickey" DuBois is the brother of Bloodsport (Robert DuBois). The character, created by writer and artist John Byrne, first appeared in Superman #4 (April 1987).

Michael posed as African-American "Bobby DuBois" who was drafted to serve in the United States Armed Forces during the Vietnam War and was sent into combat in Vietnam because his older brother was a draft dodger that ultimately went insane from guilt after Michael lost both his arms and legs. Jimmy Olsen learned of DuBois who calmed Bloodsport down.

Mickey is reintroduced to the DC Universe during Infinite Frontier with a similar backstory where he served during the Iraq War and is killed in action in Iraq.

=== Alternate versions of Mickey DuBois ===
An Earth 3 version of the character has a wife and a son.

Additional unidentified doppelgängers of Mickey are displaced with Bloodsport.

== Henri Ducard ==
Henri Ducard is a character appearing in American comic books published by DC Comics. The character, created by Sam Hamm and Denys Cowan, first appeared in Detective Comics #599 (April 1989).

Henri Ducard was a French detective who trained Bruce Wayne in manhunting and acted as one of his mentors, but his moral ambiguity played a role in their conflict. He would later encounter and befriend Tim Drake on a case involving Lady Shiva and King Snake.

In The New 52, Ducard would return in the series Batman and Robin where he trained his son Morgan Ducard in assassination under the name NoBody, an enemy of Damian Wayne.

=== Henri Ducard in other media ===
- Henri Ducard appears in The Dark Knight trilogy, portrayed by Liam Neeson.
  - He first appears in Batman Begins, where he is the true Ra's al Ghul and lives in the Himalayas near Bhutan while serving as Bruce Wayne's mentor.
  - He also appears in The Dark Knight Rises, additionally portrayed by Josh Pence as a young adult.
- Henri Ducard appears in the Robot Chicken episode "Password: Swordfish", voiced by Seth Green.
- Henri Ducard appears in the Gotham Knights episode "Night of the Owls", portrayed by Charles Mesure.
- Henri Ducard appears as a character summon in Scribblenauts Unmasked: A DC Comics Adventure.

== Cal Durham ==
- Further reading: Cal Durham at the Comic Book DB (archived from the original); Cal Durham at the Grand Comics Database

Cal Durham is a former henchman of Black Manta and a public figure in the DC Universe.

The character, created by David Michelinie and Jim Aparo, first appeared in Aquaman #57 (August–September 1977).

Cal Durham is a mercenary hired by Black Manta under the pretense of establishing an African American-dominated underwater society. To this end, Durham undergoes surgical procedures to emulate Atlantean physiology. Discovering that Manta is more focused on destroying Aquaman than fulfilling his social promise, he rebels. This results in Manta attempting to kill him and Durham re-evaluating his goals. During "One Year Later", Durham appears as the mayor of Sub Diego.

=== Cal Durham in other media ===
- Calvin "Cal" Durham appears in Young Justice, voiced by Phil LaMarr. This version is Kaldur'ahm's foster father and former henchman of Black Manta who was genetically modified to gain Atlantean-like abilities and infiltrate Atlantis, though he defected and subsequently settled down with Sha'lain'a of Shayeris.
  - Durham appears in the Young Justice tie-in comic book.

== Dust Devil ==
Dust Devil is an unnamed woman and a member of the Masters of Disaster who possesses aerokinesis. She is chosen to replace Windfall and participates on an attack on Markovia during one of their first missions.

== Dyna-Mite ==
Dyna-Mite is alias utilized by characters appearing in American comic books published by DC Comics.

=== Dan the Dyna-Mite ===
Danny Dunbar was the star pupil of Thomas N. Thomas, a high school chemistry and physical education teacher. One evening while Thomas and Dunbar are working on an experiment, Thomas' hand accidentally touches Dunbar's and they both feel energized. Thomas realizes that each of them has somehow absorbed the chemicals with which they have been working. By touching each other, Thomas and Dunbar are charged with an unknown form of energy and briefly possess superhuman powers.

They decide not to reveal their discovery publicly for fear that it would be misused. Instead, they use their new super-powers to fight crime as costumed heroes. Thomas is known as TNT and Dunbar as Dan the Dyna-Mite, and both join the wartime All-Star Squadron. Thomas and Dunbar each wears a "dyna-ring". By pressing the rings together, Thomas and Dunbar trigger a chemical reaction that temporarily charges the two heroes with energy. After TNT killed, Dunbar learns to use his powers by himself utilizing both rings.

In The New Golden Age, Dan the Dyna-Mite is searching for the lost Golden Age sidekicks when he lands on an island outside of time, where he is de-aged and targeted by the Childminder. Dan is among the lost sidekicks who are brought to the present day by Hourman.

=== Dyna-Mite in other media ===
An original incarnation of Dyna-Mite appears in the Batman: The Brave and the Bold episode "Deep Cover for Batman!", voiced by James Sie. This version is an alternate universe version of Ryan Choi / Atom who is a member of the Injustice Syndicate.
