= SpyBoy (disambiguation) =

SpyBoy may refer to:

- Spyboy (album) by Emmylou Harris (1998)
- SpyBoy the comic Series
- a type of position in New Orleans Mardi Gras Indian tribes.
- Spyboy, a 2018 album by Cha Wa
