= Walt Simonson =

American comic book writer and artist (born 1946)

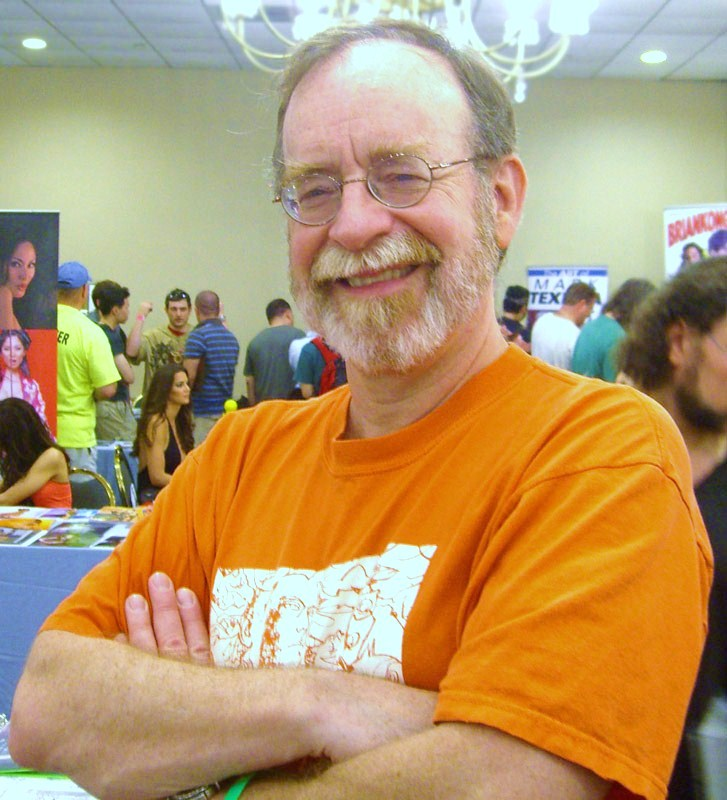
- Simonson at the Big Apple Summer Sizzler, June 13, 2009
- Born: Walter Simonson; September 2, 1946 (age 80) Knoxville, Tennessee, U.S.
- Areas: Writer, Artist
- Notable works: Thor; Fantastic Four; Detective Comics (Manhunter); Metal Men; Star Slammers; Orion; Star Wars; X-Factor
- Awards: Shazam Awards: Outstanding New Talent (1973); Best Individual Short Story (Dramatic) (1973, with Archie Goodwin); Best Individual Short Story (Dramatic) (1974, with Archie Goodwin); Best Individual Story (Dramatic) (1974); Inkwell Awards: All-in-One Award (2022); Stacy Aragon Special Recognition Award (2025)

Walter Simonson (born September 2, 1946) is an American comic book writer and artist, best known for a run on Marvel Comics' Thor from 1983 to 1987, during which he created the character Beta Ray Bill. He is also known for the creator-owned work Star Slammers, which he inaugurated in 1972 as a Rhode Island School of Design thesis. He has also worked on other Marvel titles such as X-Factor and Fantastic Four, on DC Comics books including Detective Comics, Manhunter, Metal Men and Orion, and on licensed properties such as Star Wars, Alien, Battlestar Galactica and Robocop vs. Terminator.

Simonson has won numerous awards for his work and has influenced artists such as Arthur Adams and Todd McFarlane.

He is married to comics writer Louise Simonson, with whom he collaborated as penciller on X-Factor from 1986 to 1989.

== Early life ==
Walter Simonson was born September 2, 1946, in Knoxville, Tennessee, and lived there for two and a half years. When his father, who worked for the United States Department of Agriculture, received a promotion at work that required him to relocate to Washington, D.C., Simonson, his younger brother and his parents moved to Maryland, where Simonson's parents still lived as of 1989. Simonson first read comics as a child, through the subscriptions to Walt Disney's Comics and Stories that his brother had. By the age of ten he was an avid fan of the work of Carl Barks, Little Lulu, Little Iodine, and Alex Toth's work on The Land Unknown. He also enjoyed drawing from a very young age. Although Simonson was embarrassed to be seen by girls buying comics while in high school, he discovered Russ Manning's work on Magnus Robot Fighter right before he started college, and submitted a drawing that was printed in issue #10 in May, 1965, in the publication's fan page, "Robot Gallery." This was his first published work in comics.

Simonson studied geology at Amherst College, with the intent of becoming an expert on dinosaurs. In 1964 or 1965, Simonson discovered Marvel Comics, in particular that company's version of Thor. Having already developed an interest in Norse mythology prior to discovering Stan Lee and Jack Kirby's take on the hammer-wielding deity, it became Simonson's favorite title, one that he read for four years. From this he realized that drawing comics was more fun, and more feasible as a career than working outdoors in hot weather as a geologist or paleontologist, despite harboring a love for the latter that continued the rest of his life. Simonson came to be heavily influenced by the artists who worked for Marvel, such as Jack Kirby, Steve Ditko, and Gil Kane, as well as British artist Jim Holdaway and European artists such as Moebius, Jean-Claude Mézières, Antonio Hernández Palacios and Sergio Toppi. In 1967, while in college, Simonson began writing his own epic story starring Lee and Kirby's version of the character, featuring Surtur and the Odinsword. In later years he would be given the opportunity to publish this story, as the writer on that title.

After graduating from Amherst with a degree in geology, Simonson took a year off, and then enrolled as an art major at the Rhode Island School of Design, graduating in 1972. His thesis project there was the 50-page black and white book The Star Slammers, which took him two years to write, pencil, letter and ink himself, and was initially published as a series of ashcan promotional 5.5" x 8.5" b&w chapter booklets from 1971–1973 to promote the 1974 World Science Fiction Convention in Washington, D.C. (DisCon II). Simonson would later revisit Star Slammers throughout his career, publishing it through various publishers over the decades.

== Career ==
Star Slammers graphic novel (1983)

=== 1970s ===
In August 1972, Simonson traveled to New York with his Star Slammers portfolio, and met with Gerry Boudreau, a friend who worked for DC Comics, where, as Simonson recalls, many young artists had begun working in the 1970s, in contrast to Marvel, which Simonson perceived as more stagnant. Boudreau arranged a meeting between Simonson and editor Archie Goodwin. After meeting with Goodwin, Simonson went to DC's coffee room, where he saw Howard Chaykin, Michael Kaluta, Berni Wrightson and Alan Weiss sitting together. Simonson struck up a conversation with the artists, who looked at his portfolio. Kaluta showed Simonson's work to Assistant Production Manager Jack Adler, who in turn showed it to DC Publisher Carmine Infantino, who after being shown the portfolio, summoned Simonson into his office. After speaking to Simonson for about ten minutes, he had Goodwin and his fellow editors Julius Schwartz and Joe Orlando give Simonson work. Simonson walked out of Infantino's office with jobs from each one of them.

At one point Simonson lived in the same Queens apartment building as artists Allen Milgrom, Howard Chaykin and Bernie Wrightson. Simonson recalls, "We'd get together at 3 a.m. They'd come up and we'd have popcorn and sit around and talk about whatever a 26, 27 and 20-year-old guys talk about. Our art, TV, you name it. I pretty much knew at the time, 'These are the good ole days.'"

Simonson's first professional published comic book work was illustrating writer Len Wein's story "Cyrano's Army", which appeared in DC's Weird War Tales #10, which was cover-dated January 1973. Such short back-up war stories comprised most of Simonson's early published work. He also did a number of illustrations for the Harry N. Abrams, Inc. edition of The Hobbit, and at least one unrelated print of a samurai warrior that was purchased by Harvard University's Fogg Museum, and included in its annual undergraduate-use loan program. Simonson's breakthrough illustration job was "Manhunter", a backup feature in DC's Detective Comics written by Goodwin, which cemented Simonson's professional reputation. In a 2000 interview, Simonson recalled, "What 'Manhunter' did was to establish me professionally. Before 'Manhunter,' I was one more guy doing comics; after 'Manhunter,' people in the field knew who I was. It'd won a bunch of awards the year that it ran, and after that, I really had no trouble finding work." Simonson then drew other DC series such as Metal Men and Hercules Unbound and co-created Doctor Phosphorus with Steve Englehart. Batman #300 (June 1978) featured a story by Simonson and writer David Vern Reed. In 1979 Simonson and Goodwin collaborated on an adaptation of the movie Alien, published by Heavy Metal. It was that book that Simonson began his long working relationship with letterer John Workman, who would go on to letter most of Simonson's work.

Starting in January 1977, Simonson was the original artist on The Rampaging Hulk, a black-and-white magazine published by Marvel's Curtis Magazines line. Simonson also had his first run on Thor at this time, working only as the series' artist alongside writer Len Wein. In late 1978, Simonson, Howard Chaykin, Val Mayerik, and Jim Starlin formed Upstart Associates, a shared studio space on West 29th Street in New York City. The membership of the studio changed over time.

In 1979 Simonson did writing and art on a book for the first time with his run on Marvel's licensed Battlestar Galactica series, penciling 12 sporadic issues from issues #4 to 23 with writer Roger McKenzie. Simonson began co-writing the series with McKenzie with issue #11, co-wrote some issues with Bob Layton and Steven Grant after McKenzie left the title, began writing the book himself with issue #19, staying on until issue #23.

=== 1980s ===
In 1982, Simonson and writer Chris Claremont produced The Uncanny X-Men and The New Teen Titans intercompany crossover between the top-selling Marvel and DC titles.

Simonson is best known for his work on Marvel Comics' Thor which he began writing and drawing with issue #337 (Nov. 1983). During his run as writer/artist, Simonson used the epic story that he first began writing in college in 1967, transformed Thor into a frog for three issues and introduced the supporting character Beta Ray Bill, an alien warrior who unexpectedly proved worthy to wield Thor's hammer, Mjolnir. He left the book as artist with issue #367 (May 1986), after which Sal Buscema took over. Simonson continued to write the book until issue #382 (Aug. 1987). Buscema described Simonson's stories as "very stimulating. It was a pleasure working on his plots, because they were a lot of fun to illustrate. He had a lot of great ideas, and he took Thor in a totally new direction." In late 1986 he dropped several of his assignments, including Thor, remarking that "I had a very busy season over the past six to eight months, and I'd like to take some time off, to take time maybe to take stock and refuel a bit."

Simonson was to have drawn a Daredevil story written by Frank Miller but it was never completed and remains unpublished. Simonson joined his wife Louise on the X-Factor series with issue #10. In #25, the creators gave the character the Angel blue skin and metal wings in a process which would lead to his being renamed as "Archangel". Their run on X-Factor included the story arcs "Mutant Massacre", "Fall of the Mutants," and "Inferno".

In 1983, he returned to Star Slammers with another version of the story that Marvel published in Marvel Graphic Novel No. 6.

Simonson left Upstart Associates in late 1986.

=== 1990s ===
Simonson became writer of the Fantastic Four with issue #334 (Dec. 1989), and three issues later began penciling and inking as well (#337). For issues #347–349, he collaborated with Arthur Adams, introducing the "New Fantastic Four" consisting of Wolverine, Spider-Man, Ghost Rider and the Hulk. In issue #345 he depicted dinosaurs with feathers, two decades before this idea gained mainstream acceptance among paleontologists. Simonson's decision to depict the dinosaurs in this manner was inspired by Gregory S. Paul's then-controversial book, Predatory Dinosaurs of the World, in which Paul theorized that dinosaurs had feathers. Because this idea was met with skepticism from the scientific community at the time, Simonson decided to compromise by depicting the dinosaurs with a small amount of feathers, rather than covered with them. Simonson left the Fantastic Four with issue #354 (July 1991). In 1992, he wrote and illustrated the one-shot Superman Special #1 for DC. His other Marvel credits in the decade included co-plotting/writing the Iron Man 2020 one-shot (June 1994) and writing the Heroes Reborn version of The Avengers.

In 1994 Simonson continued the adventures of the Star Slammers in a limited series as one of the founders of Malibu Comics' short-lived Bravura label.

=== 2000s ===
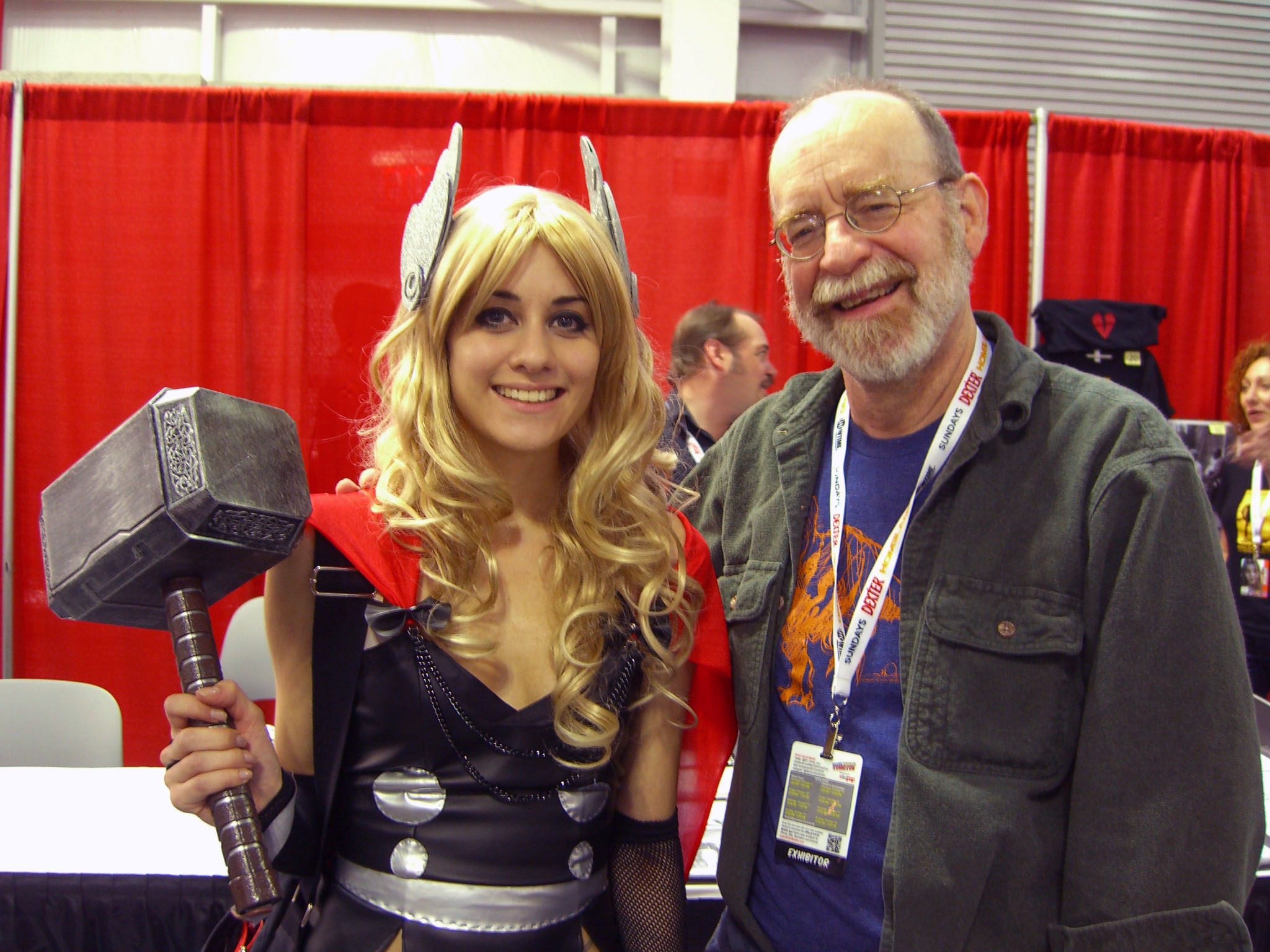
Simonson with a Thor cosplayer at the 2012 New York Comic Con

In the 2000s, Simonson mostly worked for DC Comics. From 2000 to 2002 he wrote and illustrated Orion. After that series ended, he wrote six issues of Wonder Woman (vol. 2) drawn by Jerry Ordway. In 2002, he contributed an interview to Panel Discussions, a nonfiction book about the developing movement in sequential art and narrative literature, along with Durwin Talon, Will Eisner, Mike Mignola and Mark Schultz.

From 2003 to 2006, he drew the four issue prestige mini-series Elric: The Making of a Sorcerer, written by Elric's creator, Michael Moorcock. This series was collected as a 192-page graphic novel in 2007 by DC. He continued to work for DC in 2006 writing Hawkgirl, with pencillers Howard Chaykin, Joe Bennett, and Renato Arlem.

His other work includes cover artwork for a Bat Lash mini-series and the ongoing series Vigilante, as well as writing a Wildstorm comic book series based on the online role-playing game World of Warcraft. The Warcraft series ran 25 issues and was from #15 on co-written with his wife, Louise Simonson. He wrote the Demon and Catwoman serial in Wednesday Comics in 2009.

=== 2010s ===
In 2011, Simonson had a cameo role in the live-action Thor film, appearing as one of the guests at a large Asgardian banquet. The sequel, Thor: The Dark World, featured Simonson's character Malekith the Accursed.

Simonson serves on the Disbursement Committee of the comic-book industry charity The Hero Initiative.

Other work in the 2010s includes drawing six issues of The Avengers vol. 4 in 2012 and providing the artwork for three issues of The Indestructible Hulk which guest starred Thor. Simonson collaborated with his wife for a short story in Rocketeer Adventures vol. 2 #4 and drew covers for several Rocketeer comics during this period.

In 2012 DC Comics published The Judas Coin, a graphic novel written and drawn by Simonson. The book shows how one silver coin paid to Judas to betray Jesus affects various characters down the centuries including Batman.

In July 2014 IDW Publishing published the first issue of Simonson's creator-owned series Ragnarök, which depicts a version of Thor unrelated to the Marvel version of the deity. It ran for twelve issues until 2017 and was followed by the six-issue mini-series Ragnarök: The Breaking of Helheim in 2019, also written and drawn by Simonson.

=== 2020s ===
In 2021, Walt Simonson revisited his run as an artist on X-Factor by providing covers and artwork for a two-issue X-Factor story in X-Men Legends, written by his wife Louise Simonson who had also scripted his issues for the original series.

In April 2022, Simonson and his wife Louise were reported among the more than three dozen comics creators who contributed to Operation USA's benefit anthology book, Comics for Ukraine: Sunflower Seeds, a project spearheaded by IDW Publishing Special Projects Editor Scott Dunbier, whose profits would be donated to relief efforts for Ukrainian refugees resulting from the February 2022 Russian invasion of Ukraine. Simonson's contribution was a story featuring the Star Slammers, his first time returning to that property since the 1990s.

== Awards and honors ==
- Simonson's awards include Shazam Awards for Outstanding New Talent in 1973, for Best Individual Short Story (Dramatic) in 1973 for "The Himalayan Incident" in Detective Comics #437 (with Archie Goodwin), and the same award in 1974 for "Cathedral Perilous" in Detective Comics #441 (again with Archie Goodwin). Simonson and Goodwin also won the Shazam Award for Best Individual Story (Dramatic) in 1974 for "Götterdämmerung" in Detective Comics #443. All three winning stories were a part of the Manhunter saga.
- Simonson received an Inkpot Award in 1985.
- At the 2010 Harvey Awards, which were held at the Baltimore Comic-Con on August 28, 2010, Simonson received the 2010 Hero Initiative Lifetime Achievement Award. It was presented to him by his wife, Louise Simonson.
- A collection of Simonson's Thor comics shot from the original art, published as part of IDW's Artist's Edition series, took the 2012 Eisner Award for "Best Archival Collection/Project: Comic Books" and two Harvey Awards for "Best Domestic Reprint Project and a Special Award for Excellence in Presentation".
- Asteroid 53237 Simonson was named in his honor. The official naming citation was published by the Minor Planet Center on 31 January 2018 (M.P.C. 108697).
- In 2022, Simonson was awarded the Inkwell Awards All-in-One Award.
- In 2025, he was awarded the Inkwell Awards Stacy Aragon Special Recognition Award.

== Signature ==
Simonson's distinctive signature consists of his last name, distorted to resemble a Brontosaurus. Simonson's reason for this was explained in a 2006 interview. "My mom suggested a dinosaur since I was a big dinosaur fan."

== Creative process ==
Simonson creates using the Marvel method, plotting out his storylines on a grid and then doing detailed plots for each issue. After thumbnailing the story, he writes a full script, from which he moves to full-size layouts, and then finished art.

Simonson inked his own work with a Hunt 102 crow quill pen. He switched to a brush during the mid-to-late 2000s, and despite the disparity between the two tools, Bryan Hitch, an admirer of Simonson's, stated that he could not tell the difference, calling Simonson's brushwork "as typically good and powerful as his other work." He has used Pelikan drawing ink for most of his career.

== Influence ==
Comics creators who have been influenced by Simonson's work include Arthur Adams and Todd McFarlane.

== Personal life ==
Simonson met his future wife Louise Jones in 1973. The couple started dating in August 1974 and were married in 1980.

== Bibliography ==
=== Atlas/Seaboard ===
- Thrilling Adventure Stories #2 (artist) (1975)

=== CrossGen ===
- The Path #5 (artist) (2002)

=== Dark Horse Comics ===
- American Gods #3 (artist) (2016)
- Dark Horse Presents #114 (writer/artist) (1996)
- RoboCop Versus The Terminator #1–4 (artist) (1992)
- Star Slammers Special #1 (writer/artist) (1996)
- Tarzan vs. Predator: At the Earth's Core (writer) (1996)

=== DC Comics ===
- 1st Issue Special (Doctor Fate) #9 (artist) (1975)
- 9-11: The World's Finest Comic Book Writers & Artists Tell Stories to Remember GN (penciller, among others) (2002)
- Armageddon Inferno #1–4 (artist) (1992)
- Batman #300, 312, 321 (penciller) (1978–1980)
- Batman Black and White #2 (writer/artist) (1996)
- Batman: Gotham Knights #6 (writer) (2000)
- The Big Book of Scandals ("The Lockheed Scandal") (writer/artist) (1998)
- Countdown #24 (artist, two pages) (2007)
- DC Comics Presents: Hawkman #1 (penciller) (2004)
- DC Universe Holiday Bash (writer) (1996)
- DC Universe: Legacies #5 (artist) (2010)
- Detective Comics (Manhunter stories) #437–443; (Batman) #450, 469–470; #500 (artist, among others); #1027 (artist) (1973–77, 1981, 2020)
- Doom Force Special #1 (inker, among others) (1992)
- Elric: The Making of a Sorcerer miniseries #1–4 (2004–2006)
- Hawkgirl #50–66 (writer) (2006–2007)
- Harley Quinn #0 (artist, among others) (2014)
- Hercules Unbound #7–10 (penciller; also plotter on #9), #11–12 (artist) (1976–1977)
- Heroes Against Hunger #1 (penciller, among others) (1986)
- Impulse #52 (penciller, with Ethan Van Sciver), #53 (penciller, with Angel Unzueta) (1999)
- Jack Kirby's Fourth World #1–11, 13–20 (covers) #9–10, 11, 13 (writer/artist) (1997–1998)
- JSA Classified #21–22 (writer/artist) (2007)
- The Judas Coin GN (writer/artist) (2012)
- Just Imagine Stan Lee Creating Sandman (penciller) (2002)
- Kamandi Challenge #11 (artist) (2017)
- Legends of the DC Universe 80-Page Giant #2 (writer) (2000)
- Legends of the World's Finest #1–3 (writer) (1994)
- Legion of Super-Heroes vol. 4 #94, 100 (artist, among others) (1997–1998)
- Legion of Super-Heroes vol. 7 #5 (penciller) (2012)
- Manhunter: The Special Edition TPB (new story: "The Final chapter") (plotter/artist) (1999)
- Metal Men #45–49 (artist and plot assists) (1976)
- Michael Moorcock's Multiverse #1–12 (artist) (1997–1998)
- New Gods Secret Files #1 (writer/artist) (1998)
- New Gods Special #1 (writer/artist) (2017)
- Orion #1–25 (writer/artist) (2000–2002)
- Secret Origins of Super-Villains 80-Page Giant #1 (writer) (1999)
- Sherlock Holmes #1 (cover) (1975)
- Showcase '94 #1 (New Gods) (writer) (1993)
- The Spirit #7, 8 (writer) (2007, 2011)
- Star Spangled War Stories #170, 172, 180 (artist) (1973–1974)
- Superboy and the Legion of Super-Heroes #237 (penciller) (1978)
- Superman #666 (artist) (2007)
- Superman Special #1 (writer/artist) (1992)
- Superman: The Last God of Krypton (writer) (1999)
- Superman: The Legacy of Superman (artist) (1993)
- Sword of Sorcery #4–5 (artist) (1973)
- T.H.U.N.D.E.R. Agents #3 (penciller) (2012)
- Unknown Soldier (Captain Fear) #254–256 (artist) (1981)
- Vigilante #11 (artist) (2009)
- Wednesday Comics (Demon/Catwoman) #1–12 (writer) (2009)
- Weird War Tales #10, 72 (artist) (1973–1979)
- Wonder Woman vol. 2 #189–194 (writer) (2003)
- World of Warcraft #1–25 (writer, #15–25 with Louise Simonson) (2008–2010)

=== First Comics ===
- Badger Goes Berserk #4 (artist, among others) (1989)

=== Gold Key Comics ===
- The Twilight Zone #50 ("Nature's Way") (artist) (1973)

=== IDW Publishing ===
- Ragnarök #1–12 (writer/artist) (2014–2017)
- Ragnarök: The Breaking of Helheim #1–6 (writer/artist) (2019–2020)

=== Image Comics ===
- Cyberforce #0 (writer/artist) (1993)
- Gen^{13} Bootleg #4 (artist), #11–12 (writer, with Aaron Lopresti) (1996–1997)
- Hey Kids! Comics! #4 (artist, 2 pages) (2018)
- Savage Dragon #100 (inker, 6 pages) (2002)
- Weapon Zero #T-1–T-4, 0, 1–13 (writer, with Joe Benitez) (1995–1996)
- Wildstorm! #1 (Gen13) (artist/writer, with Louise Simonson) (1995)

=== Image Comics / Marvel Comics ===
- Weapon Zero/Silver Surfer #1 (writer) (1997)

=== HM Communications, Inc. ===
- Alien: The Illustrated Story movie adaptation (artist) (1979)

=== Malibu Comics ===
- Prime #8 (artist, two pages) (1994)
- Star Slammers #1–4 (writer/artist) (1994)
- Tarzan: Love, Lies and the Lost City #1 (writer) (1993)

=== Marvel Comics ===
- The Amazing Spider-Man #222 (cover) (1981)
- Animax, miniseries, #1–3 (writer) (1986–1987)
- The Avengers #291–299, Annual #17 (writer), 300 (writer/artist) (1988–1989)
- The Avengers vol. 2 (Heroes Reborn) #8–12 (writer) (1997)
- The Avengers vol. 4 (Avengers vs. X-Men) #25–30 (penciller) (2012)
- Balder the Brave #1–4 (writer/covers) (1985–1986)
- Battlestar Galactica #11, 13, 15, 17–23 (writer, with Roger McKenzie); #4, 5, 11–17, 19–20, 22–23 (penciller) (1979–1981)
- Bizarre Adventures #29 (artist) (1981)
- Conan the Barbarian #135 (cover)
- Daredevil #236 (cover, with Bill Sienkiewicz) (1986)
- Dazzler #2 (artist, pages 11–16) (1981)
- Death's Head #9 (cover) (1989)
- Doctor Strange #45 (inker, page 7) (1981)
- Doctor Who #1 (artist, three pages), #3 (artist, one page) (1984)
- Eternals, maxi-series, #9–12 (writer) (1986)
- Fantastic Four #212 (cover), 334–341, 343–350, 352–354, Annual #23 (writer; also artist on #337–341, 343–346, 350, 352–354) (1989–1991)
- FOOM #18 (photo) (1977)
- Havok and Wolverine: Meltdown, miniseries, #1–4 (co-writer, with Louise Simonson) (1989)
- Haunt of Horror #2 (artist) (1973)
- Haunt of Horror Magazine #1 (artist) (1974)
- Heroes for Hope Starring the X-Men #1 (inker) (1985)
- Howard the Duck magazine #7 (artist, one page pinup) (1980)
- The Hulk! #11 (artist, one page), #20 (artist), #23 (cover) (1978–1981)
- The Incredible Hulk #364–367 (covers) (1989–1990)
- Indestructible Hulk #6–8 (artist) (2013)
- Iron Man Annual #8 (cover) (1986)
- Iron Man 2020 one-shot (writer) (1994)
- John Carter, Warlord of Mars #15 (penciller, with Ross Andru) (1978)
- Kickers, Inc. #9 (cover, with Mike Mignola) (1986)
- Kree-Skrull War Starring the Avengers #1 (cover and penciller) (1983)
- Marvel Comics #1000 (writer/artist, among others) (2019)
- Marvel Fanfare #41 (writer), #60 (writer/inker) (1988, 1991)
- Marvel Graphic Novel #6 (Star Slammers) (writer/artist) (1983)
- Marvel Super-Heroes #15 (writer) (1993)
- Marvel Holiday Special #1 (writer) (1991)
- Marvel Super Special #3 (Close Encounters of the Third Kind) (penciller), #18 (Raiders of the Lost Ark) (writer) (1978, 1981)
- The Mighty Thor #700 (among other artists) (2017)
- Pizzazz #10–13 (Star Wars comic) (artist) (1978)
- The Rampaging Hulk #1–3 (penciller) (1977)
- Savage Sword of Conan #7, 8, 12, 15–17 (artist) (1975–1977)
- Sensational She-Hulk #9 (inker), #50 (artist, among others) (1989, 1993)
- Star Wars #16, 49–63, 65–66 (penciller; also writer on #56–63, 65 ) (1978–1982)
- Thor (Vol. 1) #260–271, Annual #7 (penciller) (1977-1978); #337–355, 357–369, 371–382 (writer; also artist on #337–354, 357–367, 380) (1983–1987)
- Thor (Vol. 6) #24 (writer/artist) (2022)
- Thor: The Worthy #1 (writer, variant cover) (2020)
- Uncanny X-Men #171 (penciller) (1983)
- Video Jack #6 (artist, among others) (1988)
- What If (Nova) #15 (penciller) (1979)
- Wolverine: The Jungle Adventure (writer) (1990)
- X-Factor #10–11, 13–15, 17–19, 21, 23–31, 33–34, 36–39 (penciller) Annual #4 (inker) (1986–1989)
- X-Men: Gold #1 (artist) (2014)
- X-Men: Legends (X-Factor) #3–4, (New Mutants) #11 (artist) (2021–2022)

=== Marvel Comics / DC Comics ===
- Marvel Treasury Edition: Superman and Spider-Man (inker, among others) (1981)
- Uncanny X-Men and The New Teen Titans one-shot (penciller) (1982)

=== Star*Reach ===
- Star*Reach #1 (artist) (1974)

=== Topps Comics ===
- Jurassic Park movie adaptation #1–4 (writer) (1993)

=== TwoMorrows Publishing ===
- Streetwise ("The Sparking Cruise") (artist/writer) (2000)

=== Warren Publishing ===
- Creepy #102, 107, 112 (artist) (1979)

=== Books and compilations ===
==== DC Comics ====
- The Art of Walter Simonson collects stories from Detective Comics #450; 1st Issue Special #9; Unknown Soldier #254–256; Star Spangled War Stories #170 and 180; Hercules Unbound #11–12; and Metal Men #45–49, 208 pages, June 1989, ISBN 0930289412
- Jack Kirby's Fourth World Omnibus Vol. 2 (introduction only), 396 pages, August 2007, ISBN 140121357X
- Manhunter: The Special Edition collects stories from Detective Comics #437–443, 104 pages, June 1999, ISBN 1563893746

==== Marvel Comics ====
- Fantastic Four Visionaries: Walter Simonson trade paperbacks
  - Volume 1 collects Fantastic Four #334–341, 200 pages, May 2007, ISBN 0785127585
  - Volume 2 collects Fantastic Four #342–346, 120 pages, September 2008, ISBN 0785131302
  - Volume 3 collects Fantastic Four #347–350 and 352–354, 192 pages, November 2009, ISBN 0785137513
- Thor Visionaries: Walter Simonson trade paperbacks
  - Volume 1 collects Thor #337–348, 288 pages, May 2001, ISBN 0785107584
  - Volume 2 collects Thor #349–355 and 357–359, 240 pages, September 2003, ISBN 0785110461
  - Volume 3 collects Thor #360–369, 232 pages, March 2004, ISBN 078511047X
  - Volume 4 collects Thor #371–374 and Balder the Brave #1–4, 192 pages, September 2007, ISBN 0785127119
  - Volume 5 collects Thor #375–382 208 pages, February 2008, ISBN 0785127372
- Thor by Walter Simonson Omnibus collects Thor #337–355, 357–369, 371–382 and Balder the Brave #1–4, 1192 pages, April 2011, ISBN 0785146334
- Marvel Platinum: The Definitive Thor 2 an anthology with Lee, Kirby, et al., 2013, ISBN 1846535522
- Thor: The Last Viking (Ultimate Marvel Graphic Novel Collection issue 38) collects Thor #337–343
- Thor by Walter Simonson - Volume 1, 2013, collects Thor #337–?, remastered, ISBN 0785184600

==== IDW Publishing ====
- Walter Simonson's The Mighty Thor: Artist's Edition collects Thor #337–340 and 360–362, 176 pages, July 2011, ISBN 1613770383

==== Titan Books ====
- Alien - The Illustrated Story (Original Art Edition), 2012, ISBN 9781781161302

== Filmography ==
Year	Title	Role	Notes
2009	Batman: Black and White (episode "Legend")	Writer and artist	TV series
2011	Thor	Cameo as Asgardian	
2013	Thor: The Dark World	Special thanks, creator of villain Malekith the Accursed	

Preceded by John Buscema	Thor artist 1977–1978	Succeeded by John Buscema
Preceded by Carmine Infantino	Star Wars artist 1981–1982	Succeeded by Ron Frenz
Preceded by Herb Trimpe	Thor artist 1983–1986	Succeeded by Sal Buscema
Preceded by Alan Zelenetz	Thor writer 1983–1987	Succeeded by Tom DeFalco
Preceded by Ralph Macchio	The Avengers writer 1988–1989	Succeeded by Ralph Macchio
Preceded by Steve Englehart (as John Harkness)	Fantastic Four writer 1989–1991	Succeeded by Tom DeFalco
Preceded by Rich Buckler	Fantastic Four artist 1990–1991	Succeeded by Paul Ryan
Preceded by Rob Liefeld and Jeph Loeb	The Avengers writer 1997	Succeeded by Kurt Busiek
Preceded by Phil Jimenez	Wonder Woman writer 2003	Succeeded by Greg Rucka
