= Pop Mhan =

Comic artist

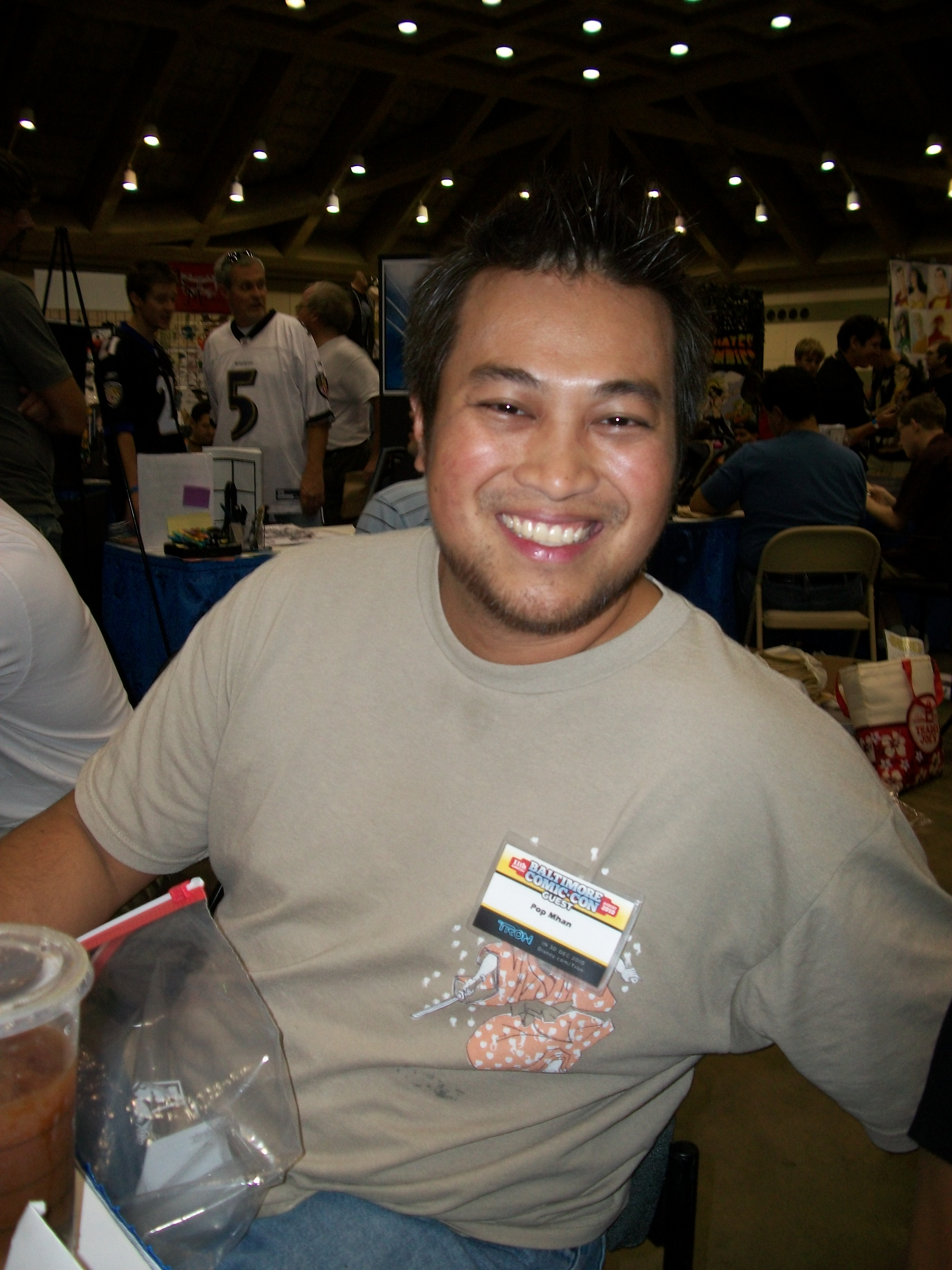
- Mhan at the Baltimore Comic Con in 2010
- Born: October 5, 1973 (age 53) Bangkok, Thailand
- Areas: Writer, Penciller, Artist, Inker

Kotchakorn Mhanaojyakorn (Thai: กชกร มโนชญากร) also known Pop Mhan (October 5, 1973) is a comic book penciller and inker.

== Biography ==
Pop Mhan was born in Bangkok, Thailand, and immigrated to the United States at the age of three. He joined Wildstorm Productions in San Diego and studied comics under Jim Lee. Pop was the penciller on Spyboy, a comic book written by Peter David and published by Dark Horse Comics, The Dead Seas for Zuda, Blank (at Tokyopop), Batgirl (at DC Comics), Bionicle (at DC Comics) and World of Warcraft, One-shot Special in 2009.

Pop has worked for WildStorm, DC Comics, Marvel Comics, Top Cow, Dark Horse and Tokyopop as well as a few other comic publishers for the past ten years. He also has done some Star Wars artist sketch cards for Topps and character design work for Hasbro.

Pop's worked on the Gears of War 3 comic book

== Bibliography ==
Spyboy #3 cover Published by Dark Horse Comics

Comics work includes:

- Union (Wildstorm Comics)
- Ghost Rider (Marvel Comics)
- The Demon: Driven Out (DC Comics)
- Flash (DC Comics)
- Tomb Raider (Top Cow)
- Spyboy (Dark Horse)
- Blank (Tokyopop)
- Batgirl (DC Comics)
- Bionicle (DC Comics)
- World of Warcraft One-shot (Wildstorm)
- He-Man and the Masters of the Universe and He-Man: The Eternity War (DC Comics)
- Injustice: Ground Zero (DC Comics)
- The Flash vol. 5 #34-38 (2018)
- Aero #1-present (backup stories) (Marvel Comics)
