= World of Warcraft (comics) =

Comic series by WildStorm

- Cover of the first issue

Publication information
- Publisher: WildStorm
- Schedule: Monthly
- Genre: Fantasy, war
- Publication date: November 2007 – December 2009
- No. of issues: 30 (25 monthly issues, 4-issue mini-series and 1 special)

Creative team
- Created by: Blizzard Entertainment
- Written by: Walt Simonson; Louise Simonson
- Artist(s): Mike Bowden; Pop Mhan
- Penciller(s): Ludo Lullabi; Jon Buran; Jon Buran
- Inker(s): Sandra Hope; Jerome K. Moore; Phillip Moy; Trevor Scott; Andy Smith; Walden Wong
- Letterer(s): Nick Napolitano; Sal Cipriano; Steve Wands; Wes Abbott
- Colorist(s): Randy Mayor; Gabriel Eltaeb
- Editor(s): Hank Kanalz; Kristy Quinn; Sarah Gaydos

Collected editions
- Volume 1 HC: ISBN 1-4012-1836-9
- Volume 2 HC: ISBN 1-4012-2370-2
- Volume 3 HC: ISBN 1-4012-2810-0
- Ashbringer HC: ISBN 1-4012-2341-9

World of Warcraft is a comic book series set in the Warcraft universe and released monthly in a standard American comic format.

== Publication history ==
At the time of its conception, the ongoing comic was set for two story arcs, both six issues each. Both were set concurrent with the events of The Burning Crusade. Later, it was expanded to last 25 issues.

World of Warcraft: Ashbringer is a four-issue mini-series that ran from late 2008 to early 2009. It was written by Micky Neilson, with pencils by Ludo Lullabi and inks by Tony Washington.

On December 16, 2009, WildStorm stated that the publication of the World of Warcraft comic series had been changed from monthly issues to original graphic novels to be released in 2010. The special, World of Warcraft: Beginnings and Ends, would be the last issue released and both the original comic (planned to be renamed to Alliance from issue 26) and the future Horde title had been canceled.

== Issue list ==
=== World of Warcraft ===
Volume 1 "Dragon Hunt"

| Issue number | Title | Release date | Author | Artist |
|---|---|---|---|---|
| 0 | Prologue | November 9, 2007 | Walter Simonson | Ludo Lullabi & Sandra Hope |
| 1 | Stranger in a Strange Land | November 14, 2007 | Walter Simonson | Ludo Lullabi & Sandra Hope |
| 2 | Killing Ground | December 13, 2007 | Walter Simonson | Ludo Lullabi & Sandra Hope |
| 3 | Destiny Awaits! | January 16, 2008 | Walter Simonson | Ludo Lullabi & Sandra Hope |
| 4 | Balancing the Scales | February 20, 2008 | Walter Simonson | Ludo Lullabi & Sandra Hope |
| 5 | The Beast Within! | March 19, 2008 | Walter Simonson | Ludo Lullabi & Sandra Hope |
| 6 | Blood | April 16, 2008 | Walter Simonson | Ludo Lullabi & Sandra Hope |
| 7 | Revelations | May 21, 2008 | Walter Simonson | Ludo Lullabi & Sandra Hope |

Volume 2

| Issue number | Title | Release date | Author | Artist |
|---|---|---|---|---|
| 8 | The Return | June 18, 2008 | Walter Simonson | Jon Landry & Jerome K. Moore |
| 9 | Through the Mirror Darkly | July 16, 2008 | Walter Simonson | Jon Landry & Jerome K. Moore |
| 10 | Last of the Line | August 20, 2008 | Walter Simonson | Jon Buran & Jerome K. Moore |
| 11 | Descent | September 17, 2008 | Walter Simonson | Jon Buran & Jerome K. Moore |
| 12 | The Enemy Revealed | October 29, 2008 | Walter Simonson | Jon Buran, Mike Bowden, Jerome K. Moore & Phil Moy |
| 13 | Flashback | November 19, 2008 | Walter Simonson | Mike Bowden, Jerome K. Moore, Phil Moy, Andy Smith, Mark Irwin, Trevor Scott & Randy Mayor |
| 14 | Into the Jaws of Death! | December 31, 2008 | Walter Simonson | Mike Bowden & Trevor Scott |

Volume 3

| Issue number | Title | Release date | Author | Artist |
|---|---|---|---|---|
| 15 | Conflicting Loyalties | January 21, 2009 | Walter Simonson | Jon Buran, Jerome K. Moore & Derek Fridolfs |
| 16 | Threat! | February 18, 2009 | Walter Simonson | Mike Bowden & Walden Wong |
| 17 | Gathering Thunder! | March 18, 2009 | Walter Simonson | Mike Bowden & Walden Wong |
| 18 | Showdown! | April 15, 2009 | Walter Simonson | Mike Bowden, Phil Moy, John Livesay & Sandra Hope |
| 19 | The Winds of War | May 20, 2009 | Walter Simonson | Mike Bowden, Phil Moy, Richard Friend & Sandra Hope |
| 20 | Repercussions | June 17, 2009 | Walter Simonson & Louise Simonson | Pop Mhan |
| 21 | Secrets | July 15, 2009 | Walter Simonson & Louise Simonson | Mike Bowden & Tony Washington |

Volume 4

| Issue number | Title | Release date | Author | Artist |
|---|---|---|---|---|
| 22 | Whispers | August 19, 2009 | Walter Simonson & Louise Simonson | Mike Bowden |
| 23 | The Gathering | September 16, 2009 | Walter Simonson & Louise Simonson | Mike Bowden |
| 24 | Hard Choices | October 21, 2009 | Walter Simonson & Louise Simonson | Mike Bowden |
| 25 | Armageddon | November 18, 2009 | Walter Simonson & Louise Simonson | Mike Bowden & Tony Washington |

=== Ashbringer ===
World of Warcraft: Ashbringer recounts the story of the Ashbringer and Alexandros Mograine.

| Issue number | Title | Release date | Author | Artist |
|---|---|---|---|---|
| 1 | Death is Contagious | September 10, 2008 | Micky Neilson | Ludo Lullabi & Tony Washington |
| 2 | Ashes to Ashes | October 22, 2008 | Micky Neilson | Ludo Lullabi & Tony Washington |
| 3 | Naxxramas | December 31, 2008 | Micky Neilson | Ludo Lullabi & Tony Washington |
| 4 | Dust to Dust | February 25, 2009 | Micky Neilson | Ludo Lullabi & Tony Washington |

=== Beginnings and Ends ===
World of Warcraft: Beginnings and Ends is a one-shot special issue that introduced new Alliance and Horde characters that had not been seen in the ongoing series.

| Issue number | Title | Release date | Author | Artist |
|---|---|---|---|---|
| One-shot | Beginnings and Ends | December 16, 2009 | Mike Costa | Pop Mhan |

== Collected editions ==
The series has been collected into trade paperbacks:

- World of Warcraft:
  - Volume 1 (collects World of Warcraft #1-7, 160 pages, hardcover, Wildstorm, August 2008, ISBN 1-4012-1836-9, Titan Books, October 2008, ISBN 1-84576-901-5, softcover, September 2009, Wildstorm, ISBN 1-4012-2076-2, Titan Books, ISBN 1-84856-096-6)
  - Volume 2 (collects World of Warcraft #8-14, 176 pages, hardcover, Wildstorm, September 2009, ISBN 1-4012-2370-2, Titan Books, November 2008, ISBN 1-84856-346-9, softcover, Wildstorm, July 2010, ISBN 1-4012-2371-0)
  - Volume 3 (176 pages, hardcover, June 2010, Wildstorm, ISBN 1-4012-2810-0)
- Ashbringer (collects mini-series, 136 pages, hardcover, Wildstorm, June 2009, ISBN 1-4012-2341-9, Titan Books, July 2009, ISBN 1-84856-297-7, softcover, Wildstorm, April 2010, ISBN 1-4012-2342-7)
