= Scorpio (DC Comics) =

- Cairo De Frey, current leader of Scorpio, art by Mike Collins.

Publication information
- Publisher: DC Comics
- First appearance: Challengers of the Unknown #47 (December 1965)
- Created by: Arnold Drake; Bob Brown

In-story information
- Type of organization: Organized crime
- Leader(s): Claude De Frey; Cairo De Frey
- Agent(s): Scorpia

Scorpio is a fictional DC Comics terrorist organization introduced in 1965's Challengers of the Unknown issue #47.

== Fictional team history ==
A mercenary group of terrorists-for-hire. Scorpio is a well-equipped organization always on the look out for advanced technology that can easily be weaponized.

In their first appearance, Scorpio battles the Sea Devils and the Challengers of the Unknown to gain control of Sponge Man, a living weapon of mass destruction with the ability to absorb water and energy to grow in size. Field leader Number Eight manipulates Sponge Man into attacking the Devils and the Challengers.

Scorpio agents vs Skyrocket, art by Tom Grummett.

Scorpio returns in Peter Cannon, Thunderbolt #2-12, where it orchestrates a conflict between the crime families of London. Thunderbolt confronts his lover Cairo DeFrey with the knowledge that she is the head of Scorpio; he does not arrest her but he does end their relationship.

Scorpio appears in Power Company: Skyrocket #1 (set between the organization's appearances in Challengers and Thunderbolt), where they kill the parents of Celia Forrestal. Celia becomes the heroine Skyrocket to avenge her parents' deaths.

== Members ==
Scorpia from Power Company: Skyrocket #1, artist Joe Staton.

- Cairo De Frey - A fashion model who took control of Scorpio after her father died. She is the leader of Scorpio and is referred to as Number One by her operatives.
- Claude De Frey - The first Number One and father of Cairo De Frey.
- Agents Number Two, and Three - Two high-ranking officers.
- Scorpia - A female field leader of Scorpio.

== In other media ==
Cairo De Frey and Scorpia appear in the Young Justice episode "First Impressions" as members of Intergang, with Scorpia additionally depicted as the sister of Whisper A'Daire.
