= Power Company =

DC Comics superhero team

- The Power Company, art by Tom Grummett.

Publication information
- Publisher: DC Comics
- First appearance: JLA #61 (February 2002)
- Created by: Kurt Busiek (writer); Tom Grummett (artist)

In-story information
- Base(s): San Francisco
- Member(s): Bork; Firestorm; Josiah Power; Manhunter; Sapphire; Skyrocket; Striker Z Witchfire

The Power Company is a team of superheroes-for-hire appearing in American comic books published by DC Comics. The team, created by Kurt Busiek and Tom Grummett, first appeared in JLA #61 (February 2002). They subsequently starred in an eponymous series that ran for eighteen issues, from April 2002 to September 2003, also written by Busiek.

== Fictional team history ==
Josiah Power was one of America's best lawyers until his metagene was triggered by the Dominators' gene bomb, leading him to be dismissed from his law firm. Power has little interest in becoming a traditional costumed hero, but it becomes readily apparent that he could not continue to practice law without attracting undue public attention. He capitalizes on his professional experience to organize a for-hire team of heroes much along the lines of a law firm. Their first mission as a team is against the East Asian criminal organization known as the Black Dragon Society. They successfully defuse a hostage situation initiated by the Society and return to their base of operations.

=== Teen Titans ===
Sapphire was abducted and became a combatant in Dark Side Club. After being rescued by Miss Martian and brought to Titans Tower with the other survivors, she leaves, preferring to stay loyal to the "forgotten, but not gone" Power Company.

=== Justice League of America ===
The team appeared in the pages of James Robinson's Justice League of America title. They were hired to defend a S.T.A.R. Labs facility, only to be defeated by Doctor Impossible and his new gang of villains. In a conversation at the JLA Watchtower, the Guardian mentions that all of the Power Company members are currently hospitalized, and that Josiah would have died had Mon-El not forced open his rib cage to help treat his heart.

=== Power Surge ===
Power Surge was a DC Comics event in 2002 intended to promote the start of The Power Company, a new comic book series by writer Kurt Busiek, who also wrote all seven issues of Power Surge. The event was composed of seven eponymous one-shot issues highlighting the seven primary members of the Power Company. Each story prominently featured the involvement of a classic, already-famous comic book character (with the 'classic' character looming much larger on the cover than the book's nominal main character).

Since each issue was essentially an origin story told in the past tense, writer Kurt Busiek used a retro style reminiscent of DC Comics' 1980s output, and even incorporated characters who were not available under other circumstances, such as the Flash and the Green Lantern, both of whom were dead in regular DC Comics continuity.

The comics featured were:

- Bork, "Vulnerability", featuring Batman and The Flash, art by Kieron Dwyer
- Josiah Power, "Career Opportunities", featuring Superman, art by Keith Giffen
- Manhunter, "A Well-Respected Man...", featuring Nightwing, art by Dan Jurgens
- Sapphire, "Hatch of the Serpent's Egg", featuring the Justice League, art by Mark Bagley
- Skyrocket, "First Gleamings", featuring Green Lantern, art by Joe Staton
- Striker Z, "Hk Jiangtou", featuring Superboy, art by Ramon F. Bachs
- Witchfire, "I Want to See the Bright Lights Tonight", featuring Wonder Woman, art by Matt Haley

=== Post-Flashpoint ===
The Power Company was reintroduced to DC Comics in DC Power: Rise of the Power Company #1 (March 2025). Founded by Josiah Power after the death of his nephew by the Sons of Liberty, the team was created to improve the public perception of superheroes. It consisted of Vixen, Black Lightning, Signal, and Jace Fox.

== Members ==
The Power Company had several superpowered partners and associates, as well a support staff dedicated to daily corporate operations. These included:

=== Partners ===
- Josiah Power - A lawyer who was forced to quit his job after the Dominators' gene bomb activated his metagene.
- Manhunter (Kirk DePaul) - A mercenary and clone of Paul Kirk / Manhunter. He is later killed by Mark Shaw.
- Skyrocket (Celia Forrestal) - A former Navy officer who inherited the energy-manipulating Argo Harness from her murdered parents.
- Witchfire (Rebecca Carstairs) - A magician and entertainer who is later revealed to be a plant-based homunculus.

=== Associates ===
- Bork (Carl Andrew Bork) - A former criminal who possesses superhuman durability derived from a magical statue.
- Firestorm (Ronnie Raymond) - A nuclear-powered hero and brief associate of the Power Company.
- Sapphire (Candace Jean Gennaro) - A teenage runaway who possesses telekinetic abilities derived from an alien gem known as the Serpent's Egg.
- Striker Z (Daniel Tsang) - A former Hong Kong stuntman and martial artist who gained superhuman physical abilities from exposure to experimental fuel.

=== Support crew ===
- Charlie Lau - A technical support specialist and a former employee of S.T.A.R. Labs' Hong Kong branch.
- Raul - The pilot of the Company Car airship.
- Silver Shannon - Josiah's assistant and the former lead singer of the Maniaks.
- Garrison Slate - An interim administrator and CEO of S.T.A.R. Labs in San Francisco.

=== Post-Flashpoint team ===
- Joshiah Power
- Batman (Jace Fox)
- Black Lightning (Jefferson Pierce)
- Vixen (Mari McCabe)
- The Signal (Duke Thomas)
- Witchfire (Rebecca Carstairs) - Former member
