= Skyrocket (character) =

- Skyrocket from Power Company.

Publication information
- Publisher: DC Comics
- First appearance: JLA #61 (February 2002)
- Created by: Kurt Busiek (writer); Tom Grummett (artist)

In-story information
- Alter ego: Celia Forrestal
- Team affiliations: Power Company; United States Navy; Argo Technologies; Justice League
- Abilities: Via Argo Harness: Flight; Energy manipulation

Skyrocket (Celia Forrestal) is a superhero published by DC Comics. She first appeared in JLA #61 (February 2002), and was created by Kurt Busiek and Tom Grummett.

== Fictional character biography ==
Celia Forrestal is an esteemed naval aviator whose career stalled due to discrimination. Additionally, her grandfather was Ralph Jackson, an Army sergeant who led a battalion during World War II and encouraged her to work for a better future. While visiting her parents, the terrorist organization Scorpio attacks and kills them while seeking to claim their Argo Harness. Celia survives due to wearing the Harness and becomes a superhero to avenge her parents, joining Josiah Power's Power Company.

Skyrocket vs. Dr. Polaris, art by Tom Grummett.

After Celia joins Power Company, Josiah provides her with a technical support crew led by Charlie Lau to maintain the Harness. As Skyrocket, she works with the team through the series sixteen-issue run, coming into repeated conflict with an interdimensional army who seek to conquer Earth through corporate takeover and mystical means.

In Action Comics #842, Skyrocket is captured by the Auctioneer and works with Nightwing, Firestorm, Superman, Blue Jay, Livewire, the Veteran, and Aquaman to escape. She later joins an all-female team of superheroines founded by Wonder Woman to repel a faux alien invasion masterminded by Professor Ivo.

== Powers and abilities ==
Skyrocket possesses no innate powers, but wields the Argo Harness. It is a powered suit of armor that enables her to fly as well as absorb energy and convert it from one form to another.

Celia pensive.

== Other versions ==
- An unrelated villain named Skyrocket, who predates the heroic character, appears in Super Friends #4.
- In 2023, writer Magdalene Visaggio revealed a rejected pitch she had written in which Superboy would take on the Skyrocket identity after transitioning into a woman named Connie.
