= SpyBoy =

Comic book series

- Spyboy #3 cover, published by Dark Horse Comics.

Publication information
- Publisher: Dark Horse Comics
- Schedule: Monthly
- Publication date: October 1999 – September 2004
- No. of issues: 17

Creative team
- Created by: Peter David, Pop Mhan
- Written by: Peter David
- Penciller: Pop Mhan
- Inker: Norman Lee

SpyBoy is a comic book series created in 1999 by writer Peter David and artists Pop Mhan and Norman Lee, and published by Dark Horse Comics.

== Publication history ==
The basic idea for SpyBoy came from Dark Horse Comics, who hired Peter David to develop the concept, including the cast, their backstories, and the series bible. Owing to the cancellation of the series by Dark Horse, not all of David's ideas were realized.

Between 1999 and 2004, SpyBoy ran for 17 issues, 2 miniseries (The M.A.N.G.A. Affair in 2003 and Final Exam in 2004), various one-shots and a crossover 3-issue miniseries with DC Comics, called SpyBoy/Young Justice (David is also creator of this DC team) published in 2002 and later compiled in one volume.

== Plot ==
This is the story of Alex Fleming, a young boy who was bullied in his school and had a normal life. But he doesn't know that he's a sleeper agent, codenamed as "SpyBoy", who works for secret organization S.H.I.R.T.S. (acronym for Secret Headquarters International Reconnaissance, Tactics, and Spies), in order to stop criminal organization S.K.I.N.S. (acronym for Supreme Killing Institute).

== Characters ==
- Alex Fleming: The titular SpyBoy, a seemingly regular teenager endowed with a superspy split personality.
- Bombshell: A veteran S.H.I.R.T.S. teen agent with a knack for explosives. Bombshell is sarcastic and abrasive, and much to her chagrin she gets assigned to help Alex, although she ends up developing feelings for his SpyBoy persona. She joined the agency after accidentally falling into their secret base while she was trying to commit suicide. Her true name is Phyllis, though while in Alex's school she goes under the identity of "Marta Hari".
- SpyGirl: SpyBoy's Japanese counterpart, a teen agent for M.A.N.G.A. (Middle Asian Network for Global Activities). Much like Bombshell, she gets later assigned to assess Alex's skills, though she is much more comfortable with it. Her civilian identity, Yukio, is Japan's top tarento and action film star, which helps her covering up her missions. She also has feelings for Alex.
- Dominic "Butch" Moody: A former bully turned into Alex's self proclaimed best friend. He dreams of becoming a spy like the rest.

== Collections ==
- Volume 1: The Deadly Gourmet Affair (SpyBoy #1–3)
- Volume 2: Trial and Terror (SpyBoy #4–6)
- Volume 3: Bet Your Life (SpyBoy #7–9)
- Volume 4: Undercover Underwear (SpyBoy #10–12)
- SpyBoy: The M.A.N.G.A Affair (also known as SpyBoy #13, also collecting the three-issue miniseries)
- Volume 5: Spy School Confidential (SpyBoy #14–17)
- SpyBoy Special 01: A Manchurian Candy Date (one-shot)
- SpyBoy: Final Exam (collecting the four-issue miniseries)
- SpyBoy/Young Justice (collecting #1–3 DC crossover)
