= Manhunter (comics) =

DC Comics superheroes

- The first three Manhunters as depicted in Secret Origins vol. 2 #22 (January 1988). Art by Walt Simonson.

Publication information
- Publisher: (All) DC Comics (Richards); Originally Quality Comics
- First appearance: (Kirk); Adventure Comics #58 (January 1941) (Richards); Police Comics #8 (March 1942) (Shaw); 1st Issue Special #5 (August 1975) (Clone); The Secret Society of Super Villains #1 (June 1976) (Lawler); Manhunter (vol. 2), #0 (October 1994) (DePaul); The Power Company: Manhunter #1 (March 2002)
- Created by: (Kirk, Shaw); Jack Kirby; Joe Simon (Lawler); Steven Grant (writer); Vince Giarrano (penciler)

In-story information
- Alter ego: – Paul Kirk – Dan Richards – Mark Shaw – Clone of Paul Kirk – Chase Lawler – Kirk DePaul – Kate Spencer
- Team affiliations: (Kirk); Justice League (Richards); Freedom Fighters (Richards, Kirk); All-Star Squadron (Shaw); Suicide Squad (DePaul); Power Company (Spencer); FBI; DEO; Birds of Prey; Justice Society of America
- Notable aliases: (Shaw); Privateer; Star-Tsar
- Abilities: Various, see below

Manhunter is the name of several fictional characters appearing in comic books published by DC Comics and Quality Comics.

== Paul Kirk, Rick Nelson, Paul Kirk ==
"Paul Kirk, Manhunter" was a crime series that ran in Adventure Comics #58–72 (Jan. 1941 – March 1942). In this original incarnation, Kirk was a non-costumed investigator who helped police solve crimes. The word "manhunter" in the title was merely an epithet describing Kirk's role and was not a name, nickname, or alias used by Kirk in the stories.

The final issue of Adventure Comics to feature a "Paul Kirk, Manhunter" story was #72. The following issue replaced it with a new Manhunter, by Joe Simon and Jack Kirby. This was Rick Nelson, a former big game hunter turned superhero. After a few issues, the name Rick Nelson was replaced by the name Paul Kirk, despite being a completely different character. The Simon/Kirby team left the feature after #80 (November 1942), though this Manhunter appeared in Adventure Comics until #92 in June 1944. This version was later brought back by Archie Goodwin in the 1970s.

== Dan Richards ==
The second Manhunter's first appearance was in the Quality Comics title Police Comics #8 (cover-date (March 1942) and his solo stories ended in issue #101 (August 1950). The Quality Comics characters were purchased by DC Comics when Quality went out of business in 1956. Dan Richards would eventually be featured in Young All-Stars and All-Star Squadron. His origin was retold in Secret Origins (vol. 2) #22 (January 1988).

Donald "Dan" Richards attended the police academy with his girlfriend's brother, Jim, who was at the top of the class, while Dan was at the very bottom. After Jim was framed for a crime he did not commit, Dan took up the identity of Manhunter to track down the actual killer. He caught the perpetrator and cleared Jim's name. Afterwards, he continued to operate as Manhunter. His sidekick was a dog named Thor, who was later retconned to be a robotic sentry operating under the auspices of the Manhunter cult.

According to Jess Nevins' Encyclopedia of Golden Age Superheroes, Manhunter's enemies include "ordinary criminals, Germans, the Nazi agent the Cobra, Dr. Sims (who has created telepathic brains-in-a-jar), the Ghostmaster, the whip-wielding female crime boss Red Kate, and the Spine-Snapper and his trained ape".

Dan's granddaughter, Marcie Cooper, became the third Harlequin after he convinced her to join the Manhunters.

Dan Richards was later killed by Mark Shaw, who had fallen back into his Dumas persona.

== Clone of Paul Kirk ==
One of Paul Kirk's remaining clones, claiming the identity of Manhunter and wearing Paul Kirk's Council-created uniform, masterminded the creation of the Secret Society of Super Villains. He died trying to kill Darkseid.

== Chase Lawler ==
A new Manhunter title (by Steven Grant and Vince Giarrano), unrelated to any of the previous Manhunters, was created in the aftermath of the 1994 miniseries Zero Hour: Crisis in Time!. Chase Lawler was a musician who summoned the Wild Huntsman to save himself and his girlfriend from harm. He did not understand the commitment he was making to the Wild Huntsman and found himself compelled to hunt the lonely. He tried to resist the urge by hunting villains, with limited success.

Lawler suffered a heart attack and Mark Shaw attempted to resuscitate him. This transferred the bond with the Wild Huntsman and the compulsion to hunt to Shaw. It was later revealed that Lawler had undergone the same mental programming as Shaw and that the Wild Huntsman was actually an illusion created as a side effect. Lawler was drugged and then murdered by Shaw, who had fallen back into his Dumas persona.

== Kirk DePaul ==
Created by Kurt Busiek and Tom Grummett, the Kirk DePaul version of Manhunter was the last surviving Council-created clone of Paul Kirk and wore a variation of that Manhunter uniform. DePaul was roaming through Africa when his progenitor was killed. DePaul was a partner in the superhero-for-hire firm known as the Power Company. Fellow partner in the firm Skyrocket despised him for his miserly, materialistic attitude.

DePaul's role in the Power Company attracted the attention of Asano Nitobe and Christine St. Clair, who confronted him. They established that he was not evil and, although St. Clair continued watching DePaul, decided not to kill him. DePaul was later murdered and decapitated by Mark Shaw who had suffered a breakdown and resumed his Dumas persona.

Although never officially confirmed, it is strongly implied that DePaul was later resurrected by Morgaine le Fey as the character "Swashbuckler" in the comic book Trinity (2008–2009); Swashbuckler is a mercenary who shows all the skills of a Manhunter. Trinity writer Kurt Busiek confirmed that Swashbuckler is the only member of the Trinity series' villainous Dreambound that has been seen before in the DC Universe. At the end of the Trinity series, the Dreambound including Swashbuckler switch to the side of the heroes, and are later pardoned in court. Their current whereabouts are unknown.

== Kate Spencer ==
The current Manhunter, Kate Spencer, in the cover art for Manhunter (vol. 3), #4; art by Jae Lee.

Kate Spencer, like Mark Shaw, is a lawyer, but instead works as a prosecutor. Outraged by the ability of supercriminals to escape justice, Spencer assembled a costume from a variety of devices left over from various heroes and villains. A Darkstar costume and Azrael's Batman gloves give Spencer enhanced strength, agility and resistance to injury while Mark Shaw's power staff allows her to fire bolts of energy. Spencer has taken on several minor league supervillains, including Copperhead and the Shadow Thief.

Spencer fought her father, a minor league supervillain who erroneously claimed to be the son of Al Pratt – the Golden Age Atom. Kate is in fact the granddaughter of Phantom Lady and Iron Munro. Al Pratt allowed Sandra Knight (the Phantom Lady) to use his contact information in order to enter a home for unwed mothers, which led to the mix-up.

Spencer, as Manhunter, began working with the US government's Department of Extranormal Operations, headed by the former criminal Mister Bones. The Manhunter series in which she appears began in 2004. This series featured appearances by Dan Richards, Mark Shaw, Chase Lawler, and Kirk DePaul.

Manhunter was initially slated to be cancelled due to low sales, but a fan campaign, along with support from DC Comics' management, allowed for another five-issue arc to be commissioned. The series was given a second reprieve from cancellation. It was meant to be restarted in July 2007, but was put on hold until several issues have been written and drawn before the title resumed publication. The series returned in June 2008 with issue #31, written by co-creator Marc Andreyko and pencilled by Michael Gaydos and ended again in January 2009 with issue #38.

Kate Spencer eventually joined the Birds of Prey, and her teammates were subsequently featured in a number of issues of the Manhunter series.

Kate Spencer briefly relocated to Gotham City where she took up a position as the new District Attorney. Her first adventures in Gotham were chronicled in a back-up feature in Batman: Streets of Gotham. She later appeared in Justice Society of America, which saw Spencer move to the city of Monument Point and join the JSA.

== Ramsey Robinson ==
Ramsey Robinson is the son of Kate Spencer and her ex-husband, Peter Robinson. He is revealed to have super powers in Manhunter (vol. 3) #33 when the seven-year-old smashed a garbage truck while rescuing his dog. Issue #38, penned as a "future story", details Ramsey's college graduation and introduces his super-powered boyfriend, Justin, as well as Jade, the super-powered daughter of Obsidian (who is named after Obsidian's twin sister, Jade). The story describes Ramsey, Justin, and Jade training to become the next generation of superheroes and ends with an older Kate presenting Ramsey with a man-made replica of her Darkstar exo-mantle as a graduation gift, hinting he's destined to be the next Manhunter.

== Manhunter 2070 ==
Manhunter 2070, by Mike Sekowsky.

Starker, a bounty hunter in the future, was the star of Manhunter 2070. The Manhunter 2070 series was created by writer and artist Mike Sekowsky. Starker first appeared in the pages of Showcase #91–93 (June–September 1970).

In 2053, Starker's father was murdered by space pirates and young Starker was taken as a galley slave. Starker took control of the pirate vessel, captured the pirates, and collected a bounty on them. Starker then decided to become a bounty hunter. He was aided by a robot named Arky.

Manhunter 2070 is one of six DC heroes featured in Walter Simonson's 2012 graphic novel The Judas Coin.

== Other versions ==
- An alternate universe version of Starker / Manhunter appears in Twilight. This version, also known as John Starker, is the older brother of Star Hawkins.
- Two female incarnations of Manhunter appears in Tangent Comics. The first version is an unnamed member of the Secret Six who owns a robotic dog named "Pooch". After she is killed by Power Girl, Lori Lemaris takes up the mantle of Manhunter.

== In other media ==
- The Paul Kirk incarnation of Manhunter appears in the Beware the Batman episode "Unique", voiced by Xander Berkeley.
- Kate Spencer and Mark Shaw appear in Arrow, portrayed by Chelah Horsdal and David Cubitt respectively.
