= Josiah Power =

- Josiah Power as depicted in Power Company #6 (September 2002). Art by Tom Grummett.

Publication information
- Publisher: DC Comics
- First appearance: JLA #61 (February 2002)
- Created by: Kurt Busiek (writer); Tom Grummett (artist)

In-story information
- Alter ego: Josiah Power
- Species: Metahuman
- Team affiliations: Power Company; S.T.A.R. Labs
- Abilities: Rock transformation; Energy absorption and projection

Josiah Power is a superhero appearing in American comic books published by DC Comics. He first appeared in JLA #61 (February 2002), and was created by Kurt Busiek and Tom Grummett.

== Fictional character biography ==
Josiah transformed from Power Company #4, artist Tom Grummett.

Josiah Power was an esteemed lawyer until his metagene was triggered by the Dominators' Gene Bomb during the Invasion! event. Following the untimely public activation of his metagene in the court room, Power was dismissed from his law firm. Opposed to the idea of becoming a superhero himself, Power founds the Power Company, a business of superheroes for hire structured like a law firm. Power lives in Marin County, California, with his life partner Rupert.

Following The New 52 and DC Rebirth relaunches, Josiah Power is reintroduced in the third volume of Black Lightning (2025), where he appears as a metahuman rights advocate.

== Powers and abilities ==
Josiah Power is a metahuman who can transform into a large, rock-skinned form with superhuman strength and durability. In this form, he emits an energy aura that can absorb and redirect other forms of energy.
