= Steve Epting =

American comics artist

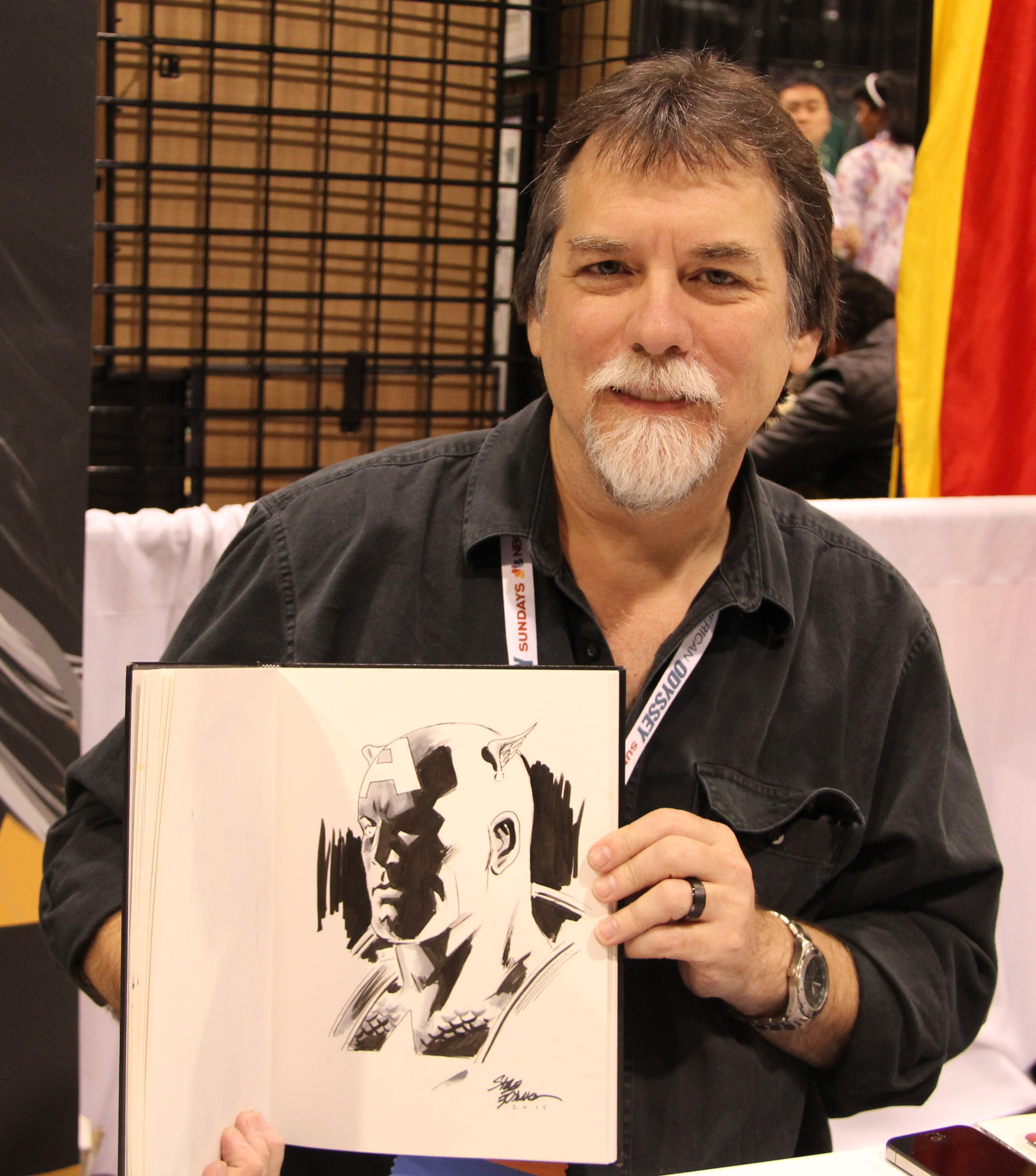
- Epting at the 2015 WonderCon in Anaheim, California
- Born: Stephen Epting; 1963 (age 62–63)
- Area: Penciller

Stephen "Steve" Epting (born 1963) is an American comics artist. He is best known for his work on The Avengers and Captain America for Marvel Comics.

== Early life ==
Epting's influences include Alex Raymond, Stan Drake, Jim Holdaway, Joe Kubert, John Buscema, Al Williamson, and José Luis García-López.

Epting received a BFA in graphic design from the University of South Carolina.

== Career ==
In 1989, Epting read of a contest being conducted by independent comic book publisher First Comics, with the winner's story to be published by the company. Although the contest did not actually exist, First declared Epting one of the "winners" and he began drawing for the company. His assignments for First included backup stories for Nexus, guest-artist duties on Dreadstar and Whisper, and two miniseries starring Nexus supporting character Judah Maccabee: Hammer of God and Hammer of God: Sword of Justice.

Epting's cover for The Avengers #345 (March 1992)

By early 1991, First Comics had gone out of business, and Epting was sending submissions to other comics publishers. He found work at Marvel Comics. Originally assigned to draw half the issues in a six–part biweekly The Avengers story arc, Epting drew five of the six issues (#335–339). Shortly thereafter, he became the full-time penciler on the series with issue #341 (Nov. 1991). Working closely with writer Bob Harras and inker/colorist Tom Palmer, Epting crafted several Avengers adventures. The creative team introduced a new version of the Swordsman character in issue #343 and worked on the "Operation: Galactic Storm" crossover storyline. His stint on The Avengers ended with issue #375 (June 1994).

After leaving The Avengers in 1994, Epting spent the next few years working on Marvel's franchise of X-Men titles including the "Age of Apocalypse" crossover and Factor-X, the alternate timeline counterparts of X-Factor. He had a run on the X-Factor ongoing series, but mostly concentrated on annuals, specials, and mini-series. These included X-Men '97, Bishop: X.S.E., and the Marvel Comics/Image Comics cross-over Team X/Team 7. In 1998, Epting collaborated with writer Roger Stern on a story starring Marvel's World War II heroes, The Invaders. It was serialized in the first three issues of the Marvel Universe anthology title and was inked by Al Williamson.

In 1999, Epting moved to DC Comics. He was the main artist on the Superman series as well as on Aquaman, where he was teamed up with writer Dan Jurgens. Their work on Aquaman began with issue #63 and ran until issue #75.

In 2001, Epting returned to Marvel's Avengers for two issues (#36 and #37), which had been relaunched three years earlier with writer Kurt Busiek. Most of his work during the early 2000s was for the independent comics publisher, CrossGen. Epting drew issues #1–25 of Crux, a fantasy-adventure book co-created with writer Mark Waid. Epting's next CrossGen project, El Cazador, was an historical adventure centering on a female pirate, it was cancelled after only six issues.

In 2004, Epting returned to Marvel as one of the artists on the Ultimate Nightmare limited series. In January 2005, Epting teamed with writer Ed Brubaker to relaunch Captain America. Brubaker and Epting produced the storyline in which Captain America was assassinated and replaced by his former sidekick Bucky Barnes. The creative team later collaborated on The Marvels Project an eight issue limited series.

In November 2010, Epting began as the artist on Marvel Comics' flagship title, Fantastic Four. Beginning in issue #583 through #587, Epting illustrated writer Jonathan Hickman's story "Three", in which Johnny Storm died. Epting was the artist on the Marvel Comics series, FF.

Epting and Ed Brubaker launched Velvet, an espionage series, for Image Comics in October 2013. Epting collaborated with writer Marguerite Bennett on a new Batwoman series for DC Comics in 2017. He drew the Year of the Villain: Hell Arisen limited series which included an early appearance of the Punchline character in issue #3 (April 2020).

== Bibliography ==
=== CrossGen ===
- Crux #1–10, 12–16, 18–20, 22–25 (2001–2003)
- El Cazador #1–6 (2003–2004)

=== DC Comics ===
- Action Comics #1007–1011 (2019)
- The Adventures of Superman #573 (1999)
- Aquaman vol. 4 #63–65, 67–69, 71–75 (2000–2001)
- Aquaman 80th Anniversary 100-Page Super Spectacular #1 (2021)
- Batwoman vol. 2 #1–4 (2017)
- Batwoman: Rebirth #1 (2017)
- DC Holiday Special 2017 #1 (2017)
- Detective Comics #1000 (2019)
- Secret Files & Origins Guide to the DC Universe 2000 #1 (one page) (2000)
- Secret Origins Featuring the JLA #1 (one page) (1999)
- Superman vol. 2 #143–145, 148, 150 (1999)
- Superman Secret Files and Origins #2 (1999)
- Year of the Villain: Hell Arisen #1–4 (2020)

=== First Comics ===
- Badger Goes Berserk #1 (1989)
- Dreadstar #58–59 (1990)
- Hammer of God #1–4 (1990)
- Hammer of God: Sword of Justice #1–2 (1991)
- Nexus #62, 74, 76–77 (1989–1991)
- Whisper #29–31 (1989)

=== Image Comics ===
- Velvet #1–15 (2013–2016)

=== Marvel Comics ===
- The Avengers #335–339, 341–347, 349–350, 355–361, 363–366, 368–369, 372–375 (1991–1994)
- The Avengers vol. 3 #36–37 (2001)
- Bishop: XSE #1—3 (1998)
- Captain America vol. 5 #1–4, 6, 8, 11–14, 18–21, 25–35, 37–38, 40–42, 46 (2005–2009)
- Captain America vol. 6 #19 (2012)
- Captain America Anniversary Tribute #1 (2021)
- Factor X #1–4 (1995)
- Fantastic Four #583–587, 600–601, 604 (2010–2012)
- Fantastic Four Anniversary Tribute #1 (2022)
- FF #1–3, 8–9 (2011)
- The Marvels Project #1–8 (2009–2010)
- Marvel Universe #1–3 (1998)
- New Avengers vol. 2 #1–6 (2013)
- Tales from the Age of Apocalypse: Sinister Bloodlines #1 (1997)
- The Mighty Thor vol. 2 #13–14 (2017)
- Thunderbolts #-1 (1997)
- Ultimate Nightmare #3 (2004)
- Uncanny X-Men #319 (1994)
- X-Factor #114–117, 119, 121 (1995–1996)
- X-Men '97 #1 (1997)
- X-Men: Alpha #1 (1995)
- X-Men Unlimited #11–12 (1996)

=== TKO Studios ===
- Sara #1-6 (2018)

Preceded by Andy Kubert	The Avengers penciller 1991–1994	Succeeded by Grant Miehm
Preceded by n/a	Captain America vol. 5 penciller 2005–2009	Succeeded by Jackson Guice
