= Marvel Graphic Novel =

Comic book series

- Cover of Marvel Graphic Novel #1: "The Death of Captain Marvel" (1982). Art by Jim Starlin.

Publication information
- Publisher: Marvel Comics
- Format: Limited series
- Genre: Science fiction Superhero; Sword and sorcery
- Publication date: 1982 – 1993
- No. of issues: 75
- Main character: List: Captain Marvel Elric New Mutants X-Men Star Slammers Killraven The Futurians Dazzler Starstruck The Swashbucklers She-Hulk Tigra The Wasp Conan the Barbarian Greenberg the Vampire Thor The Shadow

Creative team
- Written by: List: Jim Starlin Roy Thomas Chris Claremont Don McGregor John Byrne Rick Veitch Steve Gerber Jim Shooter Elaine Lee Bill Mantlo Alan Zelenetz David Michelinie Don Kraar Dennis O'Neil
- Artist: List: Jim Starlin P. Craig Russell Bob McLeod Brent Anderson Walt Simonson Dave Cockrum Rick Veitch Val Mayerik Michael Kaluta Jackson Guice Charles Vess Mark Badger
- Penciller: List: Ron Wilson Frank Springer Greg LaRocque Marc Silvestri John Byrne Gary Kwapisz Paul Ryan
- Inker: List: Armando Gil Vince Colletta Kim DeMulder Art Nichols Russ Heath
- Colorist: List: Steve Oliff Glynis Wein Paty Cockrum Petra Scotese Bob Sharen
- Editor: List: Louise Jones Archie Goodwin Bob Budiansky Al Milgrom Laurie Sutton Ralph Macchio Jim Shooter Christopher Priest Mike Carlin Larry Hama Ann Nocenti

Marvel Graphic Novel (MGN) is a line of graphic novel trade paperbacks published from 1982 to 1993 by Marvel Comics. The books were published in an oversized format, 8.5" x 11", similar to French albums. In response, DC Comics established a competitor line known as DC Graphic Novel.

== Publication history ==
The decision to launch the line was made in late 1979, after strong sales reports for the summer. Marvel editor-in-chief Jim Shooter envisioned the "books as being in the format of European albums, with cardboard covers, full-color, slick pages". In September 1980, Shooter indicated the line was delayed because of complications in putting together the contracts, which he was drafting in consultation with Marvel attorneys. In early 1981, Marvel hired Michael Z. Hobson away from Scholastic Books to be Vice-President/Publishing. His expertise in writing author contracts, which was greater than Shooter's, was a key reason. A few months later, contracts with writer/artist Jim Starlin were finalized for The Death of Captain Marvel and Dreadstar.

The Death of Captain Marvel, the first book in the line, was published in January 1982. Marvel numbered stories through 1985 up to number 20, but released many other stories in the same format that are considered unnumbered parts of the series according to the Official Overstreet Comic Book Price Guide. Overstreet continued numbering beyond the original "official" numbering, following a Marvel-published list of graphic novels. When the list stopped being published, Overstreet stopped trying to number the issues, halting at number 38, although they list 29 more issues published from 1983 through 1991, although the list is known not to include every graphic novel from this period.

The line was divided evenly between author-owned and company-owned titles. Several characters were featured in an issue of Marvel Graphic Novel before receiving their own miniseries or ongoing series. The most successful of these was The New Mutants, which ran for 100 issues. Other series which were spun-off from a Marvel Graphic Novel are Dreadstar, Void Indigo, Starstruck, and Swords of the Swashbucklers. In addition, Star Slammers had a miniseries published by Malibu Comics and Futurians was a short-lived title published by Lodestone Comics.

== List of graphic novels in the Marvel Graphic Novel line ==
#	Title	Year	Writers	Artists	Notes	Omnibus Reprints	Epic Collection Reprints	Masterworks Reprints	Other Reprints	Citations
Officially numbered titles										
1	The Death of Captain Marvel	1982	Jim Starlin			The Thanos Wars: Infinity Origins; Marvel 75th Anniversary; The Death of Captain Marvel Omnibus		Captain Marvel, Vol. 6	Captain Marvel: The Complete Collection	
2	Elric: The Dreaming City	1982	Michael Moorcock; Roy Thomas	P. Craig Russell						
3	Dreadstar	1982	Jim Starlin							
4	The New Mutants	1982	Chris Claremont	Bob McLeod	First appearance of the New Mutants.	The New Mutants Vol 1	The New Mutants, Vol. 1: Renewal			
5	X-Men: God Loves, Man Kills	1982	Chris Claremont	Brent Anderson	Elements of this story are used in the film X2.	Marvel 75th Anniversary; The Uncanny X-Men Vol 5	X-Men Epic Collection Vol. 10: God Loves, Man Kills	Uncanny X-Men Vol 9	Essential X-Men Vol 5	
6	Star Slammers	1983	Walt Simonson							
7	Killraven: Warrior of the Worlds	1983	Don McGregor	P. Craig Russell			Killraven, Vol. 1: Warrior of the Worlds	Killraven, Vol. 1	Essential Killraven, Vol. 1	
8	Super Boxers	August 1983	Ron Wilson; John Byrne	Ron Wilson						
9	The Futurians	1983	Dave Cockrum							
10	Heartburst	1983	Rick Veitch							
11	Void Indigo	1983	Steve Gerber	Val Mayerik						
12	Dazzler: The Movie	1984	Jim Shooter	Frank Springer		Women of Marvel: Celebrating Seven Decades; Dazzler Omnibus		Dazzler Vol. 3	Essential Dazzler Vol. 2	
13	Starstruck: The Luckless, the Abandoned and Forsaked	1984	Elaine Lee	Michael Kaluta	Collection of the Starstruck stories serialized in Heavy Metal.					
14	The Swords of the Swashbucklers	October 1984	Bill Mantlo	Jackson Guice						
15	The Raven Banner (A Tale of Asgard)	1984	Alan Zelenetz	Charles Vess				The Mighty Thor Vol. 24		
16	The Aladdin Effect	1985	David Michelinie	Greg LaRocque	Features Storm, She-Hulk, Tigra, and Wasp.	Women of Marvel: Celebrating Seven Decades				
17	Revenge of the Living Monolith	June 1985	David Michelinie	Marc Silvestri; Geof Isherwood	Features Spider-Man, Fantastic Four, Iron Man, Thor, and Captain America.					
18	The Sensational She-Hulk	1985	John Byrne	John Byrne; Kim DeMulder		Marvel Universe by John Byrne Vol 2; The Sensational She-Hulk by John Byrne Vol 1; Women of Marvel: Celebrating Seven Decades				
19	Conan the Barbarian: The Witch Queen of Acheron	1985	Don Kraar	Gary Kwapisz		Savage Sword of Conan: The Original Comics Years Vol 9				
20	Greenberg the Vampire	1985	J. M. DeMatteis	Mark Badger						
Overstreet-numbered titles										
21	Marada the She-Wolf	1985	Chris Claremont	John Bolton	Collects material originally serialized in Epic Illustrated #10-12.					
22	Amazing Spider-Man: Hooky	1986	Susan K. Putney	Bernie Wrightson		Spider-Man: The Graphic Novels		Amazing Spider-Man, Vol. 26		
23	Doctor Strange: Into Shamballa	1986	J. M. DeMatteis; Dan Green	Dan Green						
24	Daredevil: Love and War	1986	Frank Miller	Bill Sienkiewicz		Daredevil by Frank Miller Companion				
25	Alien Legion: A Grey Day to Die	1986	Carl Potts; Alan Zelenetz	Frank Cirocco						
26	Dracula: A Symphony in Moonlight & Nightmares	1986	Jon J Muth							
27	Emperor Doom	1987	David Michelinie	Bob Hall	features the Avengers	Doctor Doom: The Book of Doom	Avengers, Vol. 17: Judgment Day; Avengers West Coast, Vol. 3: Tales to Astonish			
28	Conan the Reaver	1987	Don Kraar	John Severin						
29	The Incredible Hulk and the Thing: The Big Change	1987	Jim Starlin	Bernie Wrightson		The Thing	Fantastic Four, Vol. 18: The More Things Change…; Incredible Hulk, Vol. 15: Ground Zero			
30	A Sailor's Story	1987	Sam Glanzman		Biographical story about Sam Glanzman's service aboard the USS Stevens (DD-479) during World War II.					
31	Wolfpack	1987	Larry Hama	Ron Wilson					Wolfpack: The Complete Collection	
32	Death of Groo	1987	Mark Evanier	Sergio Aragones						
33	The Mighty Thor: I, Whom The Gods Would Destroy	1988	Jim Shooter; Jim Owsley	Paul Ryan				The Mighty Thor Vol. 22		
34	Cloak and Dagger: Predator and Prey	1988	Bill Mantlo	Larry Stroman		Cloak and Dagger Vol 2				
35	The Shadow: Hitler's Astrologer	1988	Dennis O'Neil	Michael Kaluta; Russ Heath						
36	Willow: Movie Adaptation	1988	Mary Jo Duffy	Bob Hall; Romeo Tanghal						
37	Hercules, Prince of Power: Full Circle	1988	Bob Layton							
38	Silver Surfer: Judgment Day	1988	Stan Lee	John Buscema		Silver Surfer: Return to the Spaceways	Silver Surfer, Vol. 4: Parable			
Unofficially-numbered titles										
39	The Inhumans	1988	Ann Nocenti	Bret Blevins						
40	The Punisher: Assassin's Guild	1988	Mary Jo Duffy	Jorge Zaffino			Punisher, Vol. 2: Circle of Blood			
41	Who Framed Roger Rabbit	1988	Don Ferguson Daan Jippes	Dan Spiegle Daan Jippes						
42	Conan of the Isles	1988	Lin Carter L. Sprague DeCamp; Roy Thomas	John Buscema Dave Simons		Conan the Barbarian: The Original Marvel Years Vol 5				
43	The Dreamwalker	1989	Miguel José Ferrer Bill Mumy	Gray Morrow						
44	Ax	1988	Ernie Colón							
45	Arena	1989	Bruce Jones							
46	The Amazing Spider-Man: Parallel Lives	1989	Gerry Conway	Alex Saviuk; Andy Mushynsky			Amazing Spider-Man, Vol. 19: Assassin Nation		Spider-Man: The Graphic Novels	
47	Kull: The Vale of Shadow	1989	Alan Zelenetz	Tony DeZuniga		Kull the Conqueror: The Original Marvel Years				
48	A Sailor's Story Book Two: Winds, Dreams and Dragons	1989	Sam J. Glanzman							
49	Doctor Strange and Doctor Doom: Triumph and Torment	1989	Roger L. Stern	Mike Mignola; Mark Badger		Doctor Doom: The Book of Doom	Dr. Strange, Vol. 8: Triumph and Torment; Fantastic Four, Vol. 19: The Dream Is Dead			
50	Wolverine/Nick Fury: The Scorpio Connection	1989	Archie Goodwin	Howard V. Chaykin		Wolverine Vol. 2	Wolverine, Vol. 2: Back to Basics			
51	The Punisher: Intruder	1989	Mike Baron	Bill Reinhold			Punisher, Vol. 4: Return to Big Nothing			
52	William Gibson's Neuromancer: The Graphic Novel	1989	Tom DeHaven William Gibson	Bruce Jensen						
53	Conan the Barbarian in The Skull of Set	1989	Doug Moench	Paul Gulacy; Gary Martin						
54	Roger Rabbit: The Resurrection of Doom	1989	Bob Foster	Todd Kurosawa; Dan Spiegle; Bill Langley						
55	Squadron Supreme: Death of a Universe	1989	Mark Gruenwald	Paul Ryan; Al Williamson		Squadron Supreme by Mark Gruenwald; Squadron Supreme Classic Omnibus			Squadron Supreme: Death of a Universe	
56	Power Pack & Cloak and Dagger: Shelter from the Storm	1989	Bill Mantlo	Sal Velluto; Mark Farmer		Cloak and Dagger Vol 1; Power Pack Classic Vol 1				
57	Rick Mason: The Agent	1989	James D. Hudnall	John Ridgway						
58	Silver Surfer: The Enslavers	1990	Stan Lee Keith Pollard	Keith Pollard; Chris Ivy			Silver Surfer, Vol. 5: The Return of Thanos			
59	Conan the Barbarian: The Horn of Azoth	1990	Gerry Conway; Roy Thomas	Michael Docherty; Tony DeZuniga						
60	Rio Rides Again	1990	Doug Wildey							
61	The Black Widow: The Coldest War	1990	Gerry Conway	Ernie Colón; Mark Farmer; George Freeman; Mike Harris; Val Mayerik; Josef Rubinstein		Black Widow Strikes	Black Widow, Vol. 2: The Coldest War			
62	Ka-Zar: Guns of the Savage Land	1990	Chuck Dixon; Timothy Truman	Gary Kwapisz; Ricardo Villagran						
63	Spider-Man: Spirits of the Earth	1990	Charles Vess			Spider-Man: The Graphic Novels	Amazing Spider-Man, Vol. 21: Return of the Sinister Six			
64	The Punisher: Kingdom Gone	1990	Chuck Dixon	Jorge Zaffino			Punisher, Vol. 4: Return to Big Nothing			
65	Excalibur: Weird War III	1990	Michael Higgins	Tom Morgan; Josef Rubinstein		Excalibur Vol. 2	Excalibur, Vol. 3: Girls' School from Heck			
66	Wolverine: Bloody Choices	1991	Tom DeFalco	John Buscema		Wolverine Vol. 3	Wolverine, Vol. 3: Blood and Claws			
67	Avengers: Death Trap - The Vault	1991	Danny Fingeroth	Ron Lim; Fred Fredericks; James Sanders III	Reprinted as Venom: Death Trap - The Vault (March 1993)	Spider-Man vs. Venom	Avengers, Vol. 21: The Collection Obsession; Venom, Vol. 1: Symbiosis			
68	Conan the Rogue	1991	John Buscema Roy Thomas	John Buscema						
69	Punisher: Blood on the Moors	1991	Alan Grant John Wagner	Cam Kennedy						
70	Silver Surfer: Homecoming	1991	Jim Starlin	Bill Reinhold			Silver Surfer, Vol. 8: The Herald Ordeal			
71	Spider-Man: Fear Itself	1992	Stan Lee Gerry Conway	Ross Andru Mike Esposito		Spider-Man: The Graphic Novels	Amazing Spider-Man, Vol. 22: Round Robin			
72	Conan: The Ravagers Out of Time	1992	Roy Thomas	Michael Docherty						
73	Punisher/Black Widow: Spinning Doomsday's Web	1992	D.G. Chichester	Larry Stroman; Mark Farmer			Punisher, Vol. 7: Capital Punishment; Black Widow, Vol. 2: The Coldest War			
74	Daredevil/Black Widow: Abattoir	1993	Jim Starlin	Joe Chiodo			Daredevil, Vol. 17: Into the Fire; Black Widow, Vol. 2: The Coldest War			

== Marvel Original Graphic Novel ==
In 2013, Marvel started publishing a new line of graphic novels titled Marvel Original Graphic Novel or Marvel OGN.

Title	Year	Writers	Artists	ISBN	Notes	Citations
Avengers: Endless Wartime	2013	Warren Ellis	Mike McKone	978-0785184676	Features the Avengers against an ancient enemy from Thor's past.	
Amazing Spider-Man: Family Business	2014	Mark Waid; James Robinson	Gabriele Dell'Otto; Werther Dell'Edera	978-0785184409	Revolves around Peter Parker, not Spider-Man, being targeted by a vengeful Kingpin. As Parker combats the threat, he is helped by a woman who claims to be his long-lost sister, Teresa.	
X-Men: No More Humans	2014	Mike Carey	Salvador Larroca	978-0785154020	Features the aftermath of the "Battle of the Atom" event.	
Thanos: The Infinity Revelation	2014	Jim Starlin		978-0785184706	Features the return of Adam Warlock.	
Avengers: Rage of Ultron	2015	Rick Remender	Jerome Opeña	978-0785190400	Explores the early relationship between Hank Pym and Ultron and features two generations of the Avengers.	
Thanos: The Infinity Relativity	2015	Jim Starlin		978-0785193036	Adam Warlock, the Guardians of the Galaxy, the Silver Surfer, Gladiator, and the reunited Infinity Watch join together to thwart the threat of Annihilus.	
Thanos: The Infinity Finale	2016	Jim Starlin	Ron Lim	978-0785193050	Concludes Starlin's first Infinity trilogy.	
The Unbeatable Squirrel Girl Beats Up the Marvel Universe	2016	Ryan North	Erica Henderson	978-1302903039		
Deadpool: Bad Blood	2017	Chris Sims	Rob Liefeld	978-1302901530	The return of Rob Liefeld to Marvel, with a new Deadpool story featuring Cable and Domino.	
Thanos: The Infinity Siblings	2018	Jim Starlin	Alan Davis	978-1302908188	This is the first OGN in a trilogy. Jim Starlin has stated that this trilogy will be his final Thanos story.	
Thanos: The Infinity Conflict	2018	Jim Starlin	Alan Davis	978-1302908140	The second book in Starlin's final Thanos trilogy.	
Thanos: The Infinity Ending	2019	Jim Starlin	Alan Davis	978-1302908164	The conclusion to Starlin's final Thanos trilogy.	
