= Bill Reinhold =

American comic book artist (born 1955)

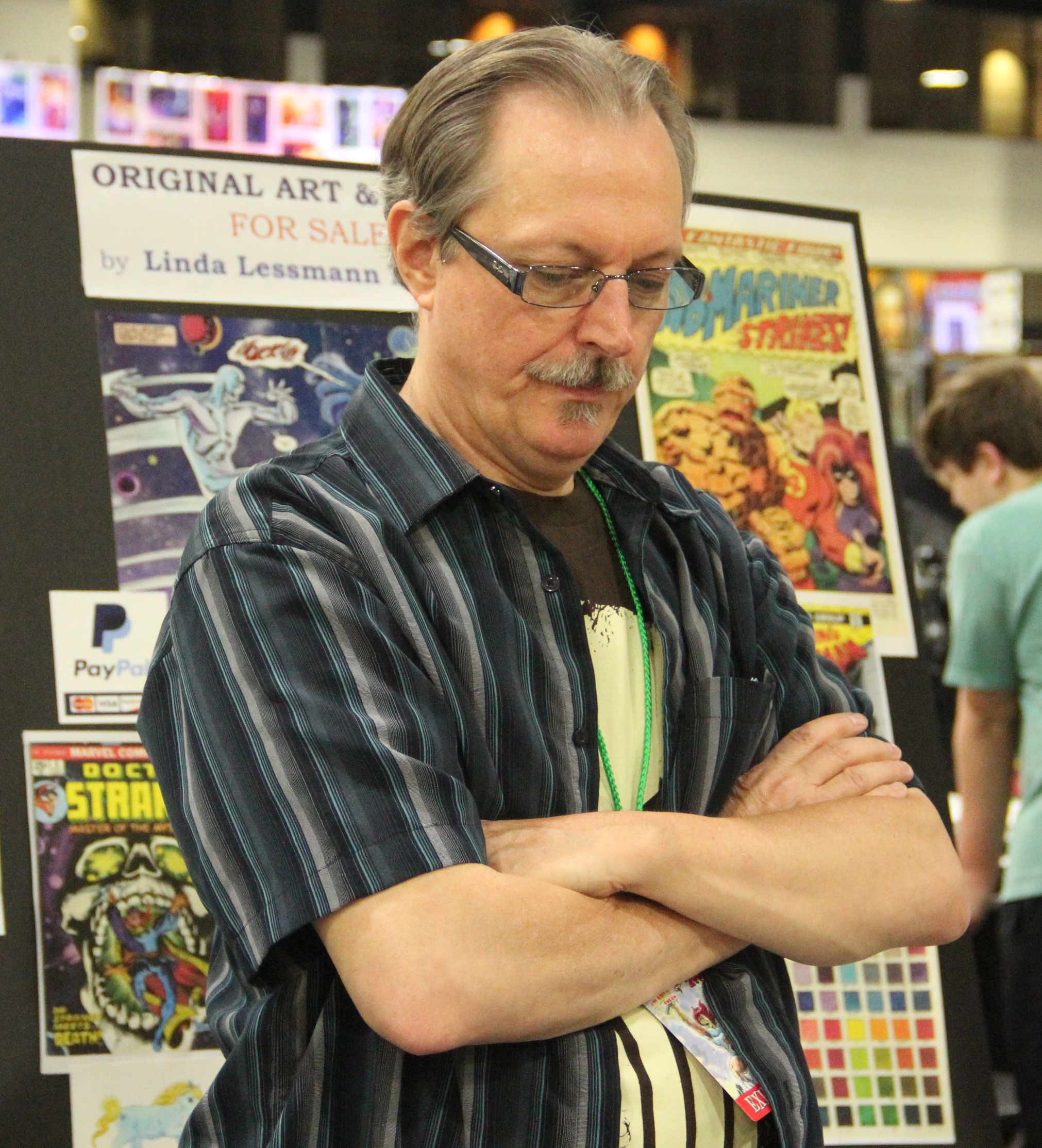
- Reinhold in 2018
- Born: March 18, 1955 (age 71)
- Areas: Penciller, Inker
- Notable works: The Badger, Punisher, Spyke, Earth X, Batman, Silver Surfer, Magnus, Robot Fighter

Bill Reinhold (born March 18, 1955) is an American comic book artist, known primarily as an inker.

== Career ==
Bill Reinhold is a 1982 graduate of the American Academy of Art in downtown Chicago.

Reinhold has been drawing and inking comic books professionally since 1981. He's done work most notably for First Comics, Marvel Comics, and DC Comics. Reinhold is known mostly for drawing characters such as The Badger, Punisher, Batman, and Silver Surfer. The bulk of his comic work doing pencils was with the writer Mike Baron. In 1993 they co-created a series called Spyke that was originally published by Epic/Marvel.

As a comic book inker he has worked with other artists on Marvel Comics books such as Daredevil, the Earth X trilogy, The Hulk, and The Amazing Spider-Man. At DC Comics he has done inking on comic series Challengers of the Unknown, The Book of Fate, Batman, Green Arrow, and Brave and the Bold.

Some artists inked by Reinhold include- Jon Bogdanove, Steve Ditko, George Freeman, Ron Garney, Keith Giffen, Adam Kubert, John Paul Leon, Doug Braithwaite, Ron Lim, Lan Medina, Steve Rude, Ryan Sook, Jill Thompson, Ron Wagner, and many more.

In 2014 Bill Reinhold illustrated "Van Helsing vs. Jack The Ripper Vol. 2" written by Jacques Lamontagne for Soleil Productions.

In 2018 Bill is currently illustrating the graphic novel "The Flying Column: Road To Manila" written by Carl Potts to be published by Naval Institute Press' Dead Reckoning.

Bill Reinhold is married to Linda Lessmann Reinhold, longtime comic-book colorist for companies such as Marvel Comics, and First comics. Much of his work was colored by Linda. They live about 50 miles northwest of Chicago, Illinois.
