= The Death of Captain Marvel =

1982 graphic novel

- Date: January 12, 1982
- Main characters: Mar-Vell
- Series: Marvel Graphic Novel
- Publisher: Marvel Comics

Creative team
- Writer: Jim Starlin
- Artist: Jim Starlin
- Letterer: James Novak
- Colourist: Steve Oliff
- ISBN: 0-939766-11-6

The Death of Captain Marvel is a 1982 graphic novel published by Marvel Comics and the first issue in the Marvel Graphic Novel series. Written and drawn by Jim Starlin, it follows Mar-Vell, the superhero Captain Marvel, as he comes to accept his impending death from cancer. The Death of Captain Marvel saw wide acclaim, and has been described as the defining story of Mar-Vell's character. Unlike many other comic book deaths, Mar-Vell's has been retained for a long time. His death freed the name of Captain Marvel for other heroes to use before it was ultimately adopted by Carol Danvers.

The story avoids or subverts tropes associated with comic books. The main characters wish to avoid fighting, and Mar-Vell's depiction as a hero is challenged as he becomes infirm. It draws a contrast between a heroic death in battle and a quiet death by illness, and the final sequence restores Mar-Vell as a superhero to fight Thanos in a dream sequence, giving him a final battle to die heroically. The Death of Captain Marvel takes a more serious approach to mortality than most comic books, exploring themes of grief and the inevitability of death. It portrays the emotions felt by Mar-Vell and his allies, particularly his surrogate son Rick Jones, as they find that his condition is terminal.

== Plot summary ==
Mar-Vell records a tape narrating his past as a superhero fighting the villains Thanos and Yon-Rogg. He is interrupted when he, Mentor, and Eros arrive at Thanos's ark to take Thanos's deceased petrified form home. While attempting to reclaim it, they are ambushed by people who worship Thanos as a god. They win the fight, but Mar-Vell falls into a coughing fit. Medical scans confirm Mar-Vell's suspicion that he has cancer. He remembers a previous adventure when he sealed a tank of nerve gas without equipment, acknowledging that the incident had exposed him to a carcinogen. Mentor promises to pursue treatment, and Mar-Vell breaks the news to the woman he loves, Elysius.

Mar-Vell records a second tape narrating his history sharing a body with Rick Jones. He travels to Earth to break the news to Jones, who lashes out at Mar-Vell for saying that there is no hope. Mar-Vell returns to Elysius and reflects positively on his life. Jones gathers several superheroes and demands that they apply their scientific and medical expertise to save Mar-Vell. He lashes out at them too when they warn him to temper his expectations.

Mar-Vell asks Eros to be there for Elysius after he dies, and he reflects on the life that he could have had with her. The superheroes work to find a cure, but they discover that Mar-Vell's nega-bands, which give him his powers and have protected him from the cancer, also prevent any form of treatment. Mar-Vell collapses and is taken to his bed where dozens of his past superhero allies come to visit him. Elysius admits to Mar-Vell that she would rather him die with his loved ones around him instead of away in battle. Jones arrives and gives a tearful apology to Mar-Vell. He is then visited by a Skrull general, who acknowledges Mar-Vell as their greatest rival and awards him the Skrull's highest honor.

As Mar-Vell falls into a coma, he sees Thanos. Thanos says that the death of his arch-nemesis must be in battle. He revitalizes Mar-Vell, and the two fight as all of Mar-Vell's slain enemies emerge from death. Mar-Vell declares that he will overcome death, but Thanos's physical form shatters as he reminds Mar-Vell that they are mortal and death is inevitable. Lady Death comes to take Mar-Vell away, but Mar-Vell accepts that he no longer needs the illusion of life, so she shows her true skeletal form. She kisses him, and they walk beyond the mortal veil. The superheroes mourn as Mar-Vell's heartbeat stops.

== Creation ==
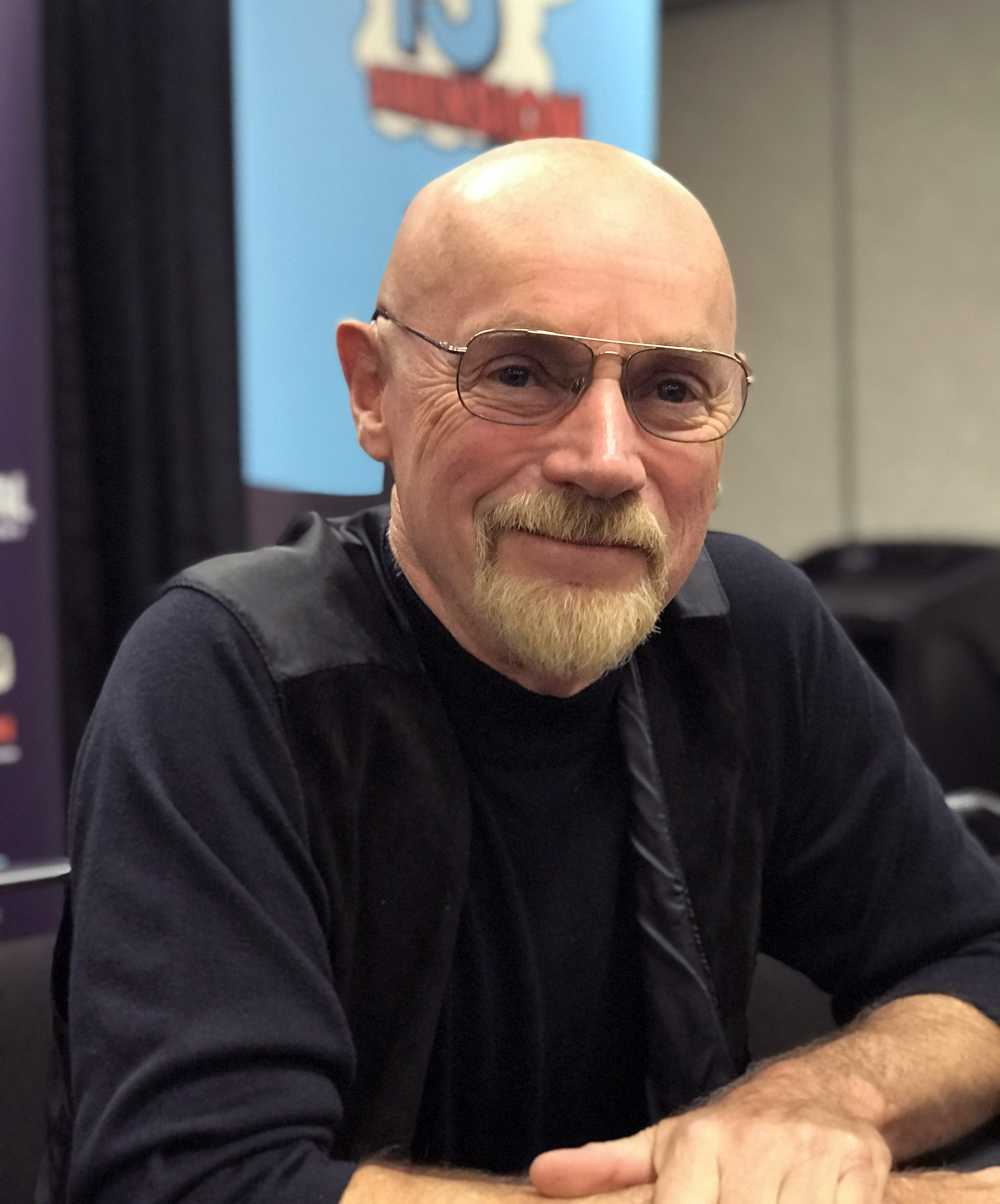
The Death of Captain Marvel was written and drawn by Jim Starlin (pictured in 2018).

Mar-Vell was created by Stan Lee and Gene Colan, and he first appeared in Marvel Super-Heroes #12 (1967) where he was introduced as an alien warrior from the Kree Empire who had come to Earth. The character had mediocre reception and did not achieve the popularity of Marvel's more well known heroes. The Death of Captain Marvel follows the events of Captain Marvel #34 and Marvel Spotlight #1–2.

The Death of Captain Marvel was written and drawn by Jim Starlin, with Steve Oliff as colorist and James Novak as letterer, and it was published by Marvel Comics as the debut issue of the Marvel Graphic Novel line. Starlin wrote the story as a means to cope with the death of his father, who had recently died of cancer, while Marvel had found that writers were unable to produce interesting stories using Mar-Vell and wished to retire the character. Starlin described the writing process as "cheaper than going to a shrink". It was released on January 12, 1982.

Relative to Starlin's other work, The Death of Captain Marvel features muted colors and heavy inking. Over the course of the story, Mar-Vell's health visibly decays as he loses weight and comes closer to death. As part of the Marvel Graphic Novel line, the story was printed on higher quality paper than standard comic books. The cover art is reminiscent of the Pietà by Michelangelo, and it creates a three-dimensional effect by portraying Death and Mar-Vell in the foreground full tone while the other heroes are behind them in half-tone.

== Themes ==
=== Acceptance of death ===
Mar-Vell reveals Death's true form at the end of the graphic novel, indicating his acceptance of death.

The Death of Captain Marvel is about the inevitability of dying and acceptance of death. Such a theme provides a contrast between the traditionally high culture associations of death art with the low culture associations of comic books. The theme is reinforced by the story's title and cover art, which informs the reader of how the story must end.

As the story progresses, Mar-Vell addresses the anger and frustration associated with a terminal illness. During the sequence in which expresses his emotions by striking out at his surroundings, he is drawn in traditional superhero poses, but this falls away as the panels grow darker and he embraces stoicism. The story addresses the common inability of one's mind to accept the fact that they will eventually die—a theme that is further explored through the idea that heroes are expected to fall in battle rather than face terminal illness. Mar-Vell is emasculated by the deprivation of a heroic death, which is countered by his symbolic fight with Thanos to give him what Starlin described as "a moment of triumph" to leave the reader satisfied with the ending. In his final act before accompanying Thanos and Death to the afterlife, Mar-Vell waves his hand over Death's face to reveal her true form. He explains that he no longer needs "the illusion", presenting an awareness and acceptance of death in a way that had not historically been portrayed in mainstream comic books.

The presence of other superheroes in the story is used to demonstrate how one's death affects their loved ones. The other heroes express their feelings of powerlessness against the disease, struggling to accept that they have found a problem that their superpowers cannot solve. At one point, the heroes question why, despite their abilities and scientific prowess, they have not cured cancer. It is particularly applicable to the father-son dynamic, as Mar-Vell can be seen as a father figure to Rick Jones. It also touches upon the death of celebrities, which is invoked when the Skrulls recognize his death in a political context while the Kree fail to recognize it for the same reason. Starlin has described the latter as symbolic of how Vietnam War veterans were treated upon returning from the war.

The followers of Thanos who the heroes fight refuse to accept death, and they seek immortality through their worship of Thanos. Immediately before Mar-Vell's condition is revealed, Mentor chastises them for trying to escape death rather than live their lives.

=== Commentary on genre ===
Many aspects of The Death of Captain Marvel challenge traditional concepts in superhero comic books. Mar-Vell is reluctant to fight alongside his allies, and he only does so in a way that minimizes harm to his adversaries. Mar-Vell's allies subvert the ideas of a superhero: Eros is a romantic and Mentor is an old man. The nega-bands that give Mar-Vell his powers do as much to harm him as assist him with his cancer, ultimately leading to his death. While death is often used for dramatic effect in comic books and is often temporary, The Death of Captain Marvel subverts this by treating Mar-Vell's death as a serious event that warrants the respect of both allies and enemies.

Mar-Vell's recounting of his past adventures, in addition to serving as a standard comic book recap sequence, allows for meaning to be found in the narrative of his life. His status as a superhero is deconstructed as the story progresses, as he loses weight and exchanges his superhero costume for a tunic that integrates his life support. The book shies away from showing the most severe aspects of his decline, preserving his image of a heroic figure when both his collapse and his coma are described by Eros rather than shown directly. The arrival of Drax the Destroyer at Mar-Vell's deathbed shows a contrast between Mar-Vell's state and the more traditional superhero death, as Drax casually talks about when he died and was resurrected.

The final dream sequence featuring a fight with Thanos is used to convey Mar-Vell's acceptance of death. It also conveys the inevitability of a superhero's journey, as Thanos insists that he must destroy because he is Thanos and that Captain Marvel must stop him because he is Captain Marvel, and the story shifts from somber drama to comic book action. In the final sequence, Thanos's dialogue on the inevitability of death is written in boxes rather than speech balloons, a format traditionally reserved for captions and narration.

=== Imagery and influences ===
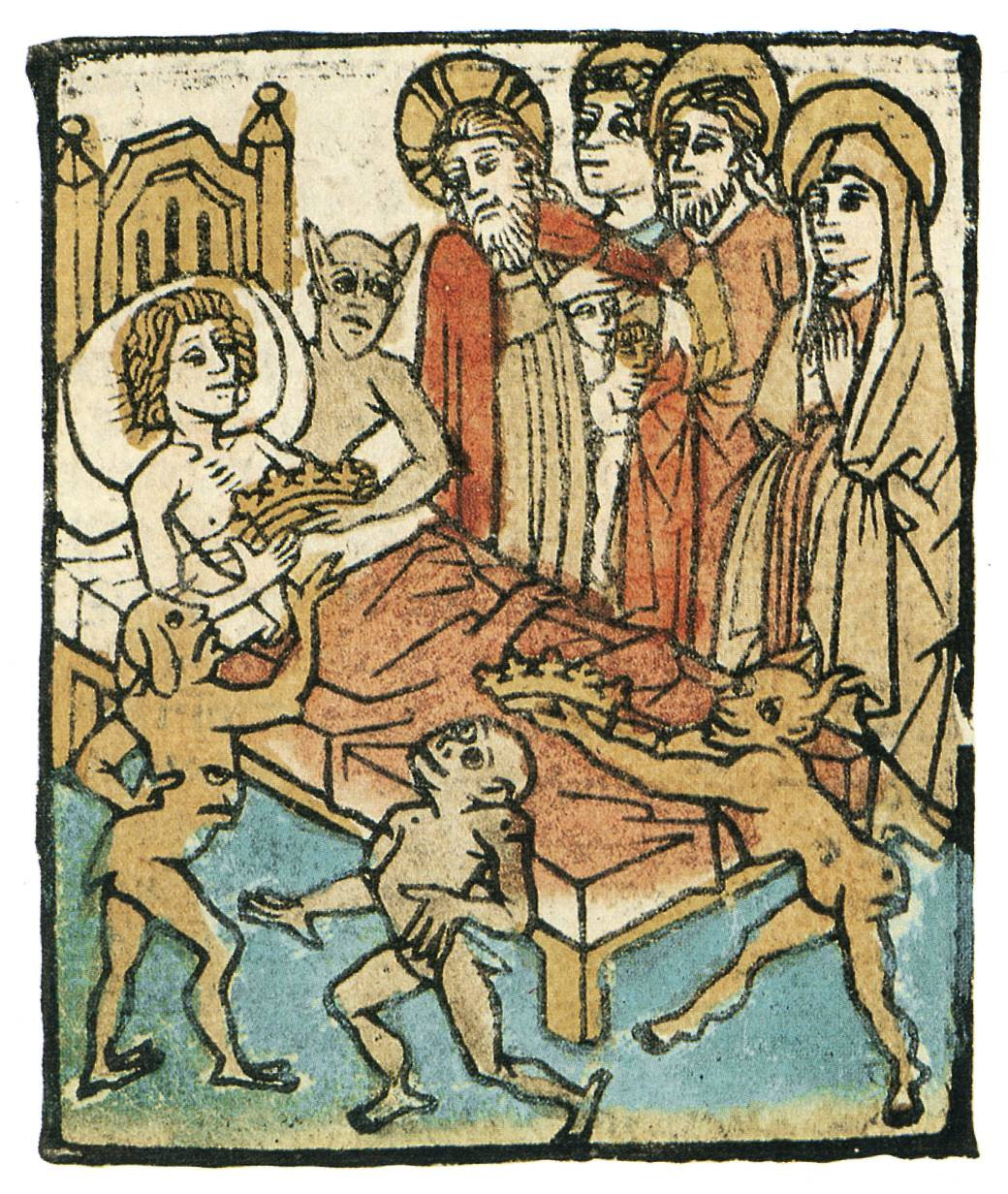
Supernatural figures surrounding a deathbed in the Ars moriendi; this imagery is invoked by The Death of Captain Marvel.

The Death of Captain Marvel invokes ideas that were presented in The Death of Ivan Ilyich by Leo Tolstoy, the first major work of death fiction in modernist literature. Mar-Vell's speech about the pain associated with dying invokes a similar passage written by Tolstoy. Both stories end with an abstraction of death from the dying man's viewpoint as he discovers that death is not to be feared. The story's themes also reflect the increasing prominence of death literature in the 1970s, including The Savage God by Al Alvarez, Mortal Lessons: Notes on the Art of Surgery by Richard Selzer, Life After Life by Raymond Moody, and A Way to Die by Victor and Rosemary Zorza. Classic imagery associated with death is used extensively throughout The Death of Captain Marvel, including skulls, heartbeats, halos of light, reminiscence of a full life, and the deathbed. It also invokes Christian iconography in a secular fashion, such as that expressed by the 15th century Catholic texts on death, the Ars moriendi.

== Reception and legacy ==
The Death of Captain Marvel is critically praised and has been described as Mar-Vell's defining story. Media studies professor José Alaniz described it as "the most radical representation of superhero death in a mainstream, continuity-driven series". The story cemented Starlin's reputation for killing comic book characters—he had previously written the deaths of Thanos and Adam Warlock, and he later wrote the death of Jason Todd for DC Comics in "A Death in the Family". The Death of Captain Marvel has been collected with other Captain Marvel stories in The Life and Death of Captain Marvel (2002), Death of Captain Marvel (2010), and Captain Marvel by Jim Starlin: The Complete Collection.

Several other characters have since taken the title of Captain Marvel for a time, including Monica Rambeau, Genis-Vell, Rick Jones, Phyla-Vell, Khn'nr, and Noh-Varr. Carol Danvers became the new Captain Marvel in 2012. Continued use of the Captain Marvel title allowed Marvel Comics to retain its trademark on the name. The character Quasar has also carried on Mar-Vell's role as "Protector of the Universe". Nitro, the character who caused Mar-Vell to get cancer, later served as the catalyst for another major event in Civil War (2006). As of 2023, Mar-Vell has been alluded to, but the character has never been revived.

== Reprints ==
Marvel Graphic Novel #1: The Death Of Captain Marvel has been reprinted in various forms.

Title	Material collected	Format	Pages	Released	ISBN
The Death Of Captain Marvel	Marvel Graphic Novel #1	TPB	64	1994	978-0785100409
The Life And Death Of Captain Marvel	Captain Marvel #25–34; Iron Man #55; Marvel Feature #12; Marvel Graphic Novel #1	TPB	304	Jun 2002	978-0785108375
The Death Of Captain Marvel	Captain Marvel #34, Marvel Spotlight #1–2; Marvel Graphic Novel #1	TPB	128	Jun 2010	978-0785146278
The Death Of Captain Marvel	Captain Marvel #34, Marvel Spotlight #1–2; Marvel Graphic Novel #1	TPB	128	Jan 2013	978-0785168041
Captain Marvel by Jim Starlin: The Complete Collection	Captain Marvel #25–34; Iron-Man #55; Marvel Feature #12; Marvel Graphic Novel #1; material from Daredevil #105; Life Of Captain Marvel #1–5	TPB	352	Dec 2016	978-1302900175
The Death Of Captain Marvel	Captain Marvel #1, 34; Marvel Super Heroes #12-13; Marvel Spotlight #1–2; Marvel Graphic Novel #1	TPB	184	2 Jan 2019	978-1302915933
The Death Of Captain Marvel	Captain Marvel #34; Marvel Spotlight #1–2, Marvel Graphic Novel No. 1 - The Death Of Captain Marvel	Premiere hardcover	128	May 2010	Bookstore cover: 978-0785146278
The Death Of Captain Marvel	Captain Marvel #34; Marvel Spotlight #1–2, Marvel Graphic Novel No. 1 - The Death Of Captain Marvel	Premiere hardcover	128	May 2010	Direct Market cover: 978-0785146285
Marvel Masterworks: Captain Marvel #6	Captain Marvel #58–62: Marvel Spotlight #1–4, 8: Marvel Super-Heroes #3: Marvel Graphic Novel #1: material from Logan's Run #6	Hardcover	296	May 2016	978-0785199946
The Death Of Captain Marvel	Marvel Super Heroes #12-13, Captain Marvel #1, 34; Marvel Spotlight #1-2, Marvel Graphic Novel No. 1: The Death Of Captain Marvel	Gallery Edition	184	9 Nov 2021	978-1302931322
The Death Of Captain Marvel	Captain Marvel (1968) #34–62; Marvel Spotlight #1-4, 8; Avengers Annual #7; Two-In-One Annual #2; Marvel Graphic Novel #1: The Death Of Captain Marvel; material from Marvel Super Heroes (1990) #3; What If...? (1977) #17; What If...? (1989) #14	Omnibus	920	7 Oct 2025	Jeff Aclin cover: 978-1302962531
The Death Of Captain Marvel	Captain Marvel (1968) #34–62; Marvel Spotlight #1-4, 8; Avengers Annual #7; Two-In-One Annual #2; Marvel Graphic Novel #1: The Death Of Captain Marvel; material from Marvel Super Heroes (1990) #3; What If...? (1977) #17; What If...? (1989) #14	Omnibus	920	7 Oct 2025	Jim Starlin DM cover: 978-1302962548

== See also ==
- The Death of Captain America
- The Night Gwen Stacy Died
