= Ultimate Origins =

Comic book series by Marvel

- Cover to Ultimate Origins #1

Publication information
- Publisher: Marvel Comics
- Schedule: Monthly
- Format: Limited series
- Genre: Superhero
- Publication date: August — December 2008
- No. of issues: 5

Creative team
- Written by: Brian Michael Bendis
- Artist: Butch Guice

Ultimate Origins is a comic book limited series published by Marvel Comics, released in June 2008. It falls under Marvel's Ultimate Marvel imprint. It is written by Brian Bendis and illustrated by Butch Guice. It is intended to be a chapter in the development of Ultimatum, a crossover event that begun in September 2008.

Jeph Loeb stated in an interview with Comic Book Resources: "What Ultimate Origin is going to do is sort of tell us how it all began. ... The Ultimate Universe isn't very old, so this isn't a cosmic story. You're not going to see the birth of a planet. What you'll see is how the superhero community was introduced into the human population. So you'll learn the importance of things like the Super Soldier program, which has been hinted at in Ultimate Spider-Man and Ultimates 1 and 2. Now, Brian is going to connect the dots."

== Plot summary ==
The story opens with a scene from Ultimate Marvel Team-Up 3, where Spider-Man confronts Bruce Banner, who is agitated and tells Spider-Man "it's all connected". Thunderbolt Ross arrives, and despite Spider-Man's attempts to defuse the situation, Banner transforms into the Hulk and escapes.

In flashbacks to World War II, Nick Fury and James Howlett are experimented on and given superpowers. They respectively gain superhuman strength and a healing factor, with Howlett being dubbed "Mutant Zero".

The story then alternates between the discovery of the artifact known as the Watcher by Carol Danvers of Project Pegasus. A lame young man, Steve Rogers, is recruited by Dum Dum Dugan into the Project Rebirth Super-Soldier Program. Through many different treatments, Rogers becomes a super-soldier and leaves his fiance Gail behind to start his life in World War II.

Later, Magneto visits the Weapon X complex and sets Wolverine free. When Magneto's mother, who works at the complex, tries to stop him, he murders her and proclaims that he hopes there "is a hell." Before his mother's death, she justifies her work with Weapon X by declaring that she only wanted to find a cure for Magneto and the others. Even later in Magneto's life, he reads a book published by Charles Xavier and is determined to meet him. Showing up in the class that Xavier teaches, they soon realize that Magneto is immune to Xavier's telepathy. They discuss the theories involved with having "mutanity" accepted and relocate to the Savage Land.

Sometime later, Nick Fury is questioned by Thunderbolt Ross while lying in a hospital bed after apparently being saved from an unspecified wartime threat by Wolverine. Ross questions him about his previous involvement with the mutant known as Weapon X and the nature of Nick Fury's unique physiology. After Fury dismisses an offer to become the "new" Captain America (in replacement of the then-missing in action original), he wonders about his usefulness in other ways.

The story skips forward for a brief synopsis of Project Rebirth 2 and important characters, including Nick Fury, Franklin Storm, Bruce Banner, Hank Pym, and Richard Parker. During this time, Storm is contracted to work with the Baxter Building project as well as Project Rebirth. Their work with the facility uses a vial of Fury's blood. Fury's identity as the donor is concealed from all scientific participants. When Banner seems to have had a breakthrough, he and Pym test it on themselves, starting with Banner. The trial goes awry and Banner as the Hulk destroys the building and severely injures Richard and Mary Parker. The sight of the infant Peter Parker in his mother's arms shocks Banner back to himself and he is subdued by Fury.

Later, Fury infiltrates the Weapon X project, and, after the shock of the environment sinks in, Fury realizes that nobody should ever know of human involvement in the mutant gene. He kills all of the scientists and their experimental subjects. The only mutant to survive is T'Challa, whom Fury feels a connection with due to their tragic pasts.

Charles Xavier is next seen being speared in the back as an act of retaliation by Magneto, who claims Charles tried to attack him in his own mind. Magneto speaks of the mutant race's fate to ascend like gods over humans and his belief that God willed this to be.

In the present day, the Watchers speak through Sue Storm and foretell certain doom that awaits before picking Rick Jones as their herald.

== Collected editions ==
Title	Material collected	Published date	ISBN
Ultimate Origins	Ultimate Origins #1-5	January 2009	978-0785130352
