= Stevie Hunter =

Publication information
- Publisher: Marvel Comics
- First appearance: The Uncanny X-Men #139 (November 1980)
- Created by: Chris Claremont; John Byrne

In-story information
- Alter ego: Stephanie "Stevie" Hunter
- Species: Human
- Team affiliations: X-Men; Xavier Institute
- Abilities: None

Stevie Hunter is a fictional character appearing in American comic books published by Marvel Comics. Her first appearance was in The Uncanny X-Men #139 as a surprise dance teacher for the newest X-Man/Student, Kitty Pryde, a.k.a. Shadowcat. She has continued to make some scattered appearance in X-Men comic books.

== Fictional character biography ==
Stevie Hunter was a professional dancer before a knee injury forced her to retire. As an alternative, she began teaching dance classes at a studio in Salem Center, her most notable student being Kitty Pryde. Stevie quickly befriends Kitty, and on occasions makes Storm, who had unofficially taken up the mantle of Kitty's surrogate mother, jealous.

At one point, Stevie and Storm attend a ballet performance at the Metropolitan Opera House, where Stevie was captured and taken hostage by Arcade's assistant Miss Locke and later rescued by the X-Men. Following this incident, Stevie learns that Kitty and Storm are part of the X-Men and becomes an ally to the group. She later begins physical education classes with the New Mutants, focusing on ballet.

Stevie has tried to stay out of the fights the mutants get in, but has become involved in a few nevertheless. In one case, she and the New Mutants are attacked by S'ym inside the X-Mansion. Stevie attempts to get Magik to safety, with Magik saving her life when S'ym attacks.

In a later incident, Stevie is present when forces from Genosha attack the X-Mansion. She escapes through a trapdoor to safety, but Storm, Warlock, Rictor, Boom-Boom, and Wolfsbane are kidnapped.

After Shadow King possesses Colossus, Stevie helps Professor X stay one step ahead of Colossus until the X-Men can get to the Danger Room. This allows them to subdue Colossus without harming him.

In X-Men Gold, Stevie Hunter reappears as a Congresswoman attempting to assist Kitty's X-Men in presenting the mutant case during a governmental proposition for an unjust mutant deportation act.

== Reception and legacy ==
In 1982's X-Men: God Loves, Man Kills, Kitty Pryde lashes out at Stevie and uses the n-word after a Stevie tries to relax Kitty when a boy calls Kitty a "mutie-lover". In an interview with the graphic novel's writer, Chris Claremont, he stated they intended to use the word to get the severity of anti-mutant bigotry across to the audience. The moment remains controversial.

== Sources ==
- Gill, Katherine (2016). Representation of the American South in Marvel Comics, 1963-2016 (Masters thesis). University of Mississippi.
- Stucky, Alex Jay (2019). White liberalism in black comics: metaphorical marginalization and the displacement of America (Doctorate thesis). University of Kansas.
