= List of First Comics publications =

This is a list of First Comics publications.

== Titles ==
=== A ===
- Alter Ego (4 issues)
- American Flagg! (50 issues, plus special, then 12 issue series)
- Alien Bones (graphic novel, 2019)

=== B ===
- Badger (70 issues, plus a 4 issue limited series and two graphic novels, Hexbreaker and Badger Bedlam)
- Beowulf (graphic novel, 1984)
- Betty Boop's Big Break (graphic novel, 1990)

=== C ===
- Corum (Michael Moorcock adaptation):
  - The Chronicles of Corum (12 issues, 1987-1988)
  - The Bull and the Spear (4 issues, 1989)
- Classics Illustrated (27 issues, 1990–1991)
- Crossroads (5 issues, 1988)

=== D ===
- Dreadstar (from Epic Comics, 38 issues, 1986–1991)
- Dynamo Joe (15 issues, plus 1 special, 1986–1988)

=== E ===
- Elric (Michael Moorcock adaptation):
  - Sailor on the Seas of Fate (7 issues, 1985-1986)
  - Elric of Melnibone (1 issue, 1986)
  - Weird of the White Wolf (5 issues, 1986-1987)
  - The Vanishing Tower (6 issues, 1987-1988)
  - The Bane of the Black Sword (6 issues, 1988)
- E-Man (from Charlton Comics, 25 issues then goes to Comico)
- The Enchanted Apples of Oz (graphic novel, 1987)
- Evangeline (from Comico, 12 issues, 1987–1989)

=== F ===
- First Adventures (5 issues, anthology series featuring Whisper, Blaze Barlow, and Dynamo Joe)
- The Forgotten Forest of Oz (graphic novel, 1988)

=== G ===
- The Gift (one-shot)
- Grimjack (81 issues, plus a limited series and a graphic novel, Demon Knight)
- Ghostbusters (4 issues, based on the Filmation series)

=== H ===
- Hammer of God: Sword of Justice (2 issue mini-series, tie-in with Nexus)
- Hawkmoon (Michael Moorcock adaptation):
  - The Jewel in the Skull (4 issue mini-series, 1986)
  - The Mad God's Amulet (4 issue mini-series, 1987)
  - The Sword of Dawn (4 issue mini-series, 1987)
  - The Runestaff (4 issue mini-series, 1988)

=== I ===
- Inspector Oh (regular series, 2016)
- The Ice King of Oz (graphic novel, 1987)

=== J ===
- Jon Sable, Freelance (56 issues, 1983–1988)
- Mike Grell's Sable (10 issues, 1990, reprinting Jon Sable, Freelance)

=== L ===
- Lone Wolf and Cub (45 issues)
- Love Town (regular series, 2018)

=== M ===
- Mars (12 issues)
- Mazinger (graphic novel)
- Meta-4 (3 issues)
- Munden's Bar (2 specials)

=== N ===
- Nexus (80 issues, plus several limited series)

=== O ===
- Original E-Man & Michael Mauser (7 issues)

=== P ===
- The P.I.s: Michael Mauser & Ms. Tree (3 issues, 1985)
- Psychoblast (9 issues, 1987–1988)

=== S ===
- Sable (27 issues)
- The Secret Island of Oz (graphic novel, 1987)
- Sensei (4 issues)
- Serving Supes (ongoing)
- Shatter (14 issues, plus a special)
- Starslayer (from Pacific Comics, 28 issues)
- Squalor (4 issues)

=== T ===
- Team Yankee (6 issues, followed by graphic novel)
- Teenage Mutant Ninja Turtles (comics) (4 graphic novels)
- Time Beavers (graphic novel)
- Time² (two graphic novels)
- Twilight Man (4 issues)

=== W ===
- Warp (19 issues, plus 3 specials)
- Whisper (37 issues, plus a special)
- Witch Finder General (6 issue mini-series)

=== Z ===
- Zen: Hard Bounty (6 issues)
- Zen: Home (one-shot)
- Zero Tolerance (4 issues)
