= Moth (character) =

The Moth is the name of two American comic-book superhero characters. The first was created by artist Jim Mooney and an unknown writer for Fox Feature Syndicate in 1940, during the period fans and historians call the Golden Age of Comic Books. The second was created by writer-artist Steve Rude in 1998 for Dark Horse Comics.

== Fox Feature Syndicate ==
Moth

Publication information
- Publisher: Fox Feature Syndicate
- First appearance: Mystery Men Comics #9 (April 1940)
- Created by: Jim Mooney (artist) and unknown writer

In-story information
- Alter ego: Jack Mahoney
- Abilities: Flight

One of the first comic-book superheroes, the Moth was created by artist Jim Mooney and an unknown writer using the joint pseudonym "Norton Kingsley", which at least once was rendered as "Norman Kingsley". The character — a superhero whose sole apparent superpower, flight, was never explained as either natural or as an ability built into his costume — debuted in comic-book publisher Fox Feature Syndicate's Mystery Men Comics #9 (cover-dated April 1940), during the period fans and historians call the Golden Age of Comic Books.

According to Jess Nevins' Encyclopedia of Golden Age Superheroes, "he fights a life-draining mad scientist, the Weather Kings (who use weather control machines in an attempt to take over the United States), a Dr. Frankenstein-like grave-robbing mad scientist, and others".

The Moth starred in four stories, drawn either all by Mooney or with the second drawn by Greg Chapian, both using the Kingsley pseudonym. The feature ended with Mystery Men Comics #12 (July 1940).

== Dark Horse Comics ==
Moth
- The Moth #1 (April 2004)

Publication information
- Publisher: Dark Horse Comics
- First appearance: Dark Horse Presents #138 (1998)
- Created by: Steve Rude & Gary Martin

In-story information
- Alter ego: Jack Mahoney
- Team affiliations: Vansant Circus
- Abilities: Highly trained acrobat, excellent wrestler/brawler, gliding via suit, sleep/flammable gas gun concealed in fingertips

=== Publication history ===
The Moth (real name Jack Mahoney) is a fictional superhero published by Dark Horse Comics. Created by Steve Rude, The Moth first appeared in Dark Horse Presents #138, followed by an appearance in Madman Comics #13 by Dark Horse Comics, and then the 56-page The Moth - Special (March 2004).

=== Fictional character biography ===
The Moth is a circus performer named Jack Mahoney. Mahoney developed the Moth costume for his high-wire act, and he also uses it catch wanted criminals in exchange for bounties.

During his four-issue solo series, the Moth encounters a biker gang whose leader has had a bounty offered for his capture. The Moth turns him over to the authorities. He also encounters a supernatural lion-man who is on a killing spree. His victims include the Moth's mentor Victor, the ringmaster of the circus where the Moth performed, and a member of the biker gang. The Moth inherits the circus and enlists the help of the biker gang he clashed with earlier to help him track down the creature and exact revenge.

In the next story, the Moth turns rival mob families against each other in order to collect bounties offered for the leaders of both groups.
