= X-Men: Children of the Atom (comics) =

1999 comic book limited series

- Cover of the 1st issue

Publication information
- Publisher: Marvel Comics
- Genre: Superhero
- Publication date: 1999
- No. of issues: 6
- Main character: X-Men

Creative team
- Written by: Joe Casey
- Artist(s): Steve Rude, Paul Smith, Esad Ribić

X-Men: Children of the Atom is a six-issue comic book limited series released in 1999, retelling the origins of the X-Men.

The first issue is about the teen years of Cyclops, Jean Grey, Iceman, Beast and Angel, while the mutants have just appeared in the news. Professor X is pretending to be a school coordinator, in order to help the young mutants.
