= Spyke (limited series) =

Spyke is a 4-issue comic-book limited series created by Mike Baron (writer) and Bill Reinhold (penciller), and published in 1993 by the Marvel Comics imprint Epic Comics. Marie Javins was the editor for the series.
