= El Cazador (comics) =

2003 comic book series

- Cover to El Cazador #1, art by Steve Epting

Publication information
- Publisher: CrossGen
- Schedule: Monthly
- Format: Ongoing series
- Publication date: October 2003 - June 2004
- No. of issues: 6

Creative team
- Written by: Chuck Dixon
- Artist: Steve Epting
- Inker: Dan Lanphear
- Colorist: Jason Keith

El Cazador is a CrossGen comic book title set in the Sigilverse, CrossGen's shared universe. While most Sigilverse titles are set in the distant future, El Cazador's plot is set on Earth during the Golden Age of Piracy in the 17th century.

El Cazador began in 2003 and ran for six issues before CrossGen's bankruptcy brought the series to a halt. The company also released a prequel one-shot, El Cazador: The Bloody Ballad of Blackjack Tom, which told the story of the series main villain. El Cazador was one of the few pirate-themed comic book series in the modern age of comics, and perhaps the recent ongoing series in the genre to have a female lead character. El Cazador was written by Chuck Dixon and drawn by Steve Epting.

== Plot and characters ==
The issue begins as the ship carrying Spanish noblewoman Donessa Cinzia Elena Marie Esperanza Diego-Luis Hidalgo and other members of her family are attacked by a pirate captain named Blackjack Tom. Donessa is one of the few survivors of the attack. She vows to hunt down Tom and free his captives. To accomplish this, she renames her ship El Cazador ("The Hunter") and becomes a pirate herself, dubbed "Lady Sin" by her crew. The remaining issues of the series describe the beginnings of Lady Sin's quest as she abandons her privileged past for a life on the high seas.
