= Sonic Disruptors =

Publication information
- Publisher: DC Comics
- Schedule: Uncompleted
- Format: Limited series
- Genre: Science fiction
- Publication date: December 1987 – July 1988
- No. of issues: 7 of a planned 12

Creative team
- Written by: Mike Baron
- Artist: Barry Crain

Sonic Disruptors was a comic book limited series written by Mike Baron with art by Barry Crain, and published by DC Comics between 1987 and 1988. Although it was advertised as being a twelve-issue story, sales were poor, and the last issue published was #7. Later that year, Amazing Heroes announced that the story would be completed in a graphic novel with art by Mike Mignola, which went unpublished.

To date, the series remains incomplete; Baron has stated that he had not written a script for issue 8.

Baron has publicly described the series as a "dud", saying that he "didn't know what (he) was doing (when writing the series)", that he "had no end to the series in mind", and that he "didn't construct the characters properly".

== Plot ==
Sonic Disruptors depicted a futuristic America ruled by a theocratic military dictatorship, where the only source of resistance is a pirate radio station broadcasting from orbit.
