= Steve Rude =

American comics artist

- Rude at Dragon Con in 2026
- Born: December 31, 1956 (age 69) Madison, Wisconsin, U.S.
- Areas: Writer, Penciller, Inker
- Notable works: Nexus
- Awards: Russ Manning Award (1984); Kirby Award (1986); Eisner Award (1988); Harvey Award (1991)

Steve Rude (born December 31, 1956) is an American comics artist. He is best known as the co-creator of Nexus.

== Early life ==
Steve Rude was born on December 31, 1956, in Madison, Wisconsin. He attended the Milwaukee School of Art and Design, the University of Wisconsin–Madison, and the Madison Area Technical College.

== Career ==
In 1981, Rude and writer Mike Baron created Nexus, an independent science fiction comic book with a large supporting cast. For the series, Rude designed numerous distinctive alien races, including the Thunes, the Amphibs, the Quattros, the Giz, the Demons, and others. The series ran for eighty issues although Rude did not pencil them all, and seven short, almost-yearly mini-series after the initial series ended.

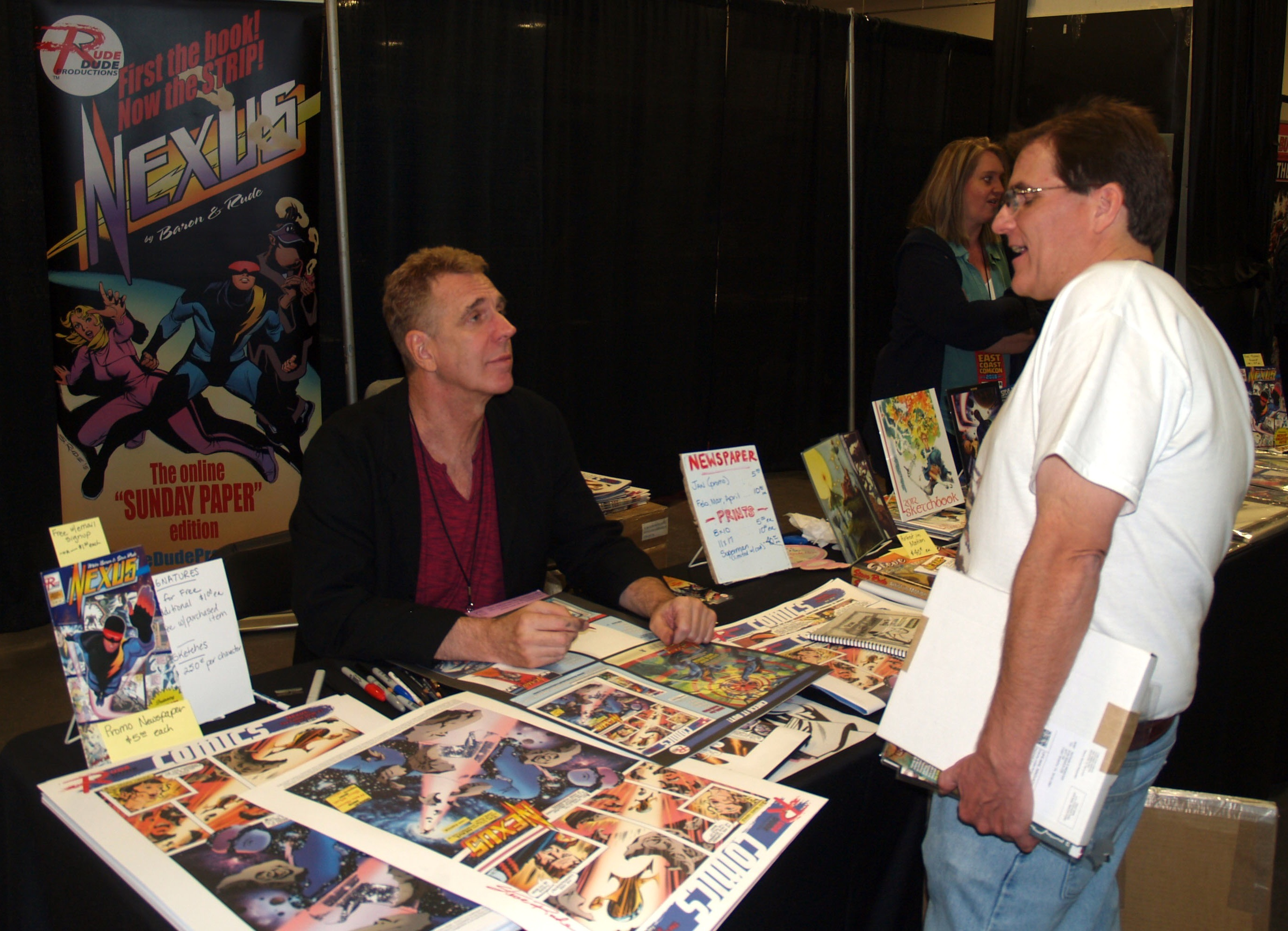
Rude (left) speaking with a fan at an April 2016 comics convention.

His first work for DC Comics appeared in Tales of the Teen Titans #48 (Nov. 1984). Rude collaborated with writer Dave Gibbons on the World's Finest miniseries for DC in 1990. DC Comics writer and executive Paul Levitz has noted that Rude's artwork "plays on Norman Rockwell's Americana, while his sleek sequential storytelling owes a debt to the work of Alex Toth."

Rude drew two intercompany crossovers in the 1990s: the Magnus, Robot Fighter / Nexus two-issue limited series for Valiant Comics and Dark Horse Comics and The Incredible Hulk vs. Superman one-shot for Marvel Comics and DC. Rude's work for Marvel includes X-Men: Children of the Atom, Spider-Man: Lifeline, Thor: Godstorm, and Captain America: What Price Glory.

In 2004 Rude co-created and pencilled The Moth with writer/inker Gary Martin.

Rude's own "Rude Dude Productions" was announced on November 15, 2006. It has published new issues of Nexus and The Moth as well as an anthology series. The new Nexus series was Rude's first work with Baron since the last issue published by Dark Horse Comics. The first Nexus issue from Rude Dude was released as issue #99 (part 1 of the "Space Opera" story), and was set immediately following the last Dark Horse issue. After a few delays, issue #100 was published, followed by the final two issues of "Space Opera" printed together as one double-sized issue.

Rude returned to DC Comics in 2013 and drew the Before Watchmen: Dollar Bill one-shot. The following year, Rude and writer Jerry Ordway produced a Superman story for DC's Adventures of Superman digital series. Rude drew the 1930s variant cover for Action Comics #1000 (June 2018).

Steve Rude was the subject of the documentary film Rude Dude: The Steve Rude Story. Filmed over the course of three years, Rude spoke of his efforts to enter the fine art world and his struggles with bipolar disorder.

== Awards ==
Rude received the Russ Manning Most Promising Newcomer Award in 1984. He has won several "Best Artist" awards including the Kirby Award in 1986, the Best Artist in 1988, and the Harvey Award in 1991. He received an Inkpot Award in 1988. He won the Eisner Award for Best Penciller in 1993 and 1997.

== Bibliography ==
=== Capital Comics ===
- Nexus #1–3 (1981–1982)
- Nexus vol. 2 #1–6 (1983–1984)

=== Comico ===
- Comico Christmas Special #1 (four pages) (1988)
- Jonny Quest #4 (1986)
- Space Ghost #1 (1987)

=== Dark Horse Comics ===
- Dark Horse Presents #138 (The Moth) (1998)
- Dark Horse Presents vol. 2 #12–15, 18, 23–26, 29–34 (2012–2014)
- The Moth #1–4, Special #1 (2004)
- Nexus #89–98 (1996–1997)
- Nexus: Alien Justice #1–3 (1992–1993)
- Nexus Meets Madman #1 (1996)
- Nexus: The Origin #1 (1992)
- Nexus: The Wages of Sin #1–4 (1995)
- San Diego Comic-Con Comics #1 (1992)

=== DC Comics ===
- Adventures of Superman vol. 2 #17 (2014)
- Batman #400 (one page) (1986)
- Batman Black and White Vol. 2 HC (2002)
- Before Watchmen: Dollar Bill #1 (2013)
- Fanboy #6 (1999)
- History of the DC Universe HC (one page) (1988)
- The Incredible Hulk vs. Superman #1 (1999)
- Legends of the DC Universe #14 (Jimmy Olsen) (1999)
- Mister Miracle Special #1 (1987)
- New Gods Secret Files #1 (one page) (1998)
- Tales of the Teen Titans #48 (1984)
- Who's Who in the DC Universe #16 (two pages) (1992)
- Who's Who: The Definitive Directory of the DC Universe #3, 10, 18, 25 (1985–1987)
- Wonder Woman vol. 2 #200 (one page) (2004)
- World's Finest #1–3 (1990)

=== First Comics ===
- E-Man vol. 2 #7 (one page) (1983)
- Grimjack #6 (1985)
- Munden's Bar Annual #1 (1988)
- Nexus vol. 2 #7–22, 24–28, 33–36, 39–42, 45–50, 52–55, 58–60, 78 (1985–1991)
- The Next Nexus #1–4 (1989)

=== Image Comics ===
- Phantom Force #2 (1994)

=== Marvel Comics ===
- Captain America: What Price Glory #1–4 (2003)
- Fantastic Four vol. 3 #50 (2002)
- Fantastic Four: The World's Greatest Comics Magazine #12 (2002)
- Heroes for Hope Starring the X-Men #1 (two pages) (1985)
- Marvel #1 (2020)
- Marvel Fanfare #45 (one page) (1989)
- Official Handbook of the Marvel Universe #14 (1984)
- Official Handbook of the Marvel Universe vol. 2 #17 (1987)
- Spider-Man: Lifeline #1–3 (2001)
- Thor: Godstorm #1–3 (2001–2002)
- X-Men:Children of the Atom #1–6 (1999–2000)

=== Rude Dude Productions ===
- The Moth Special Edition #1 (2008)
- Nexus, FCBD 2007 #1 (2007)
- Nexus: Space Opera #1–4 (2007–2009)

=== Valiant Comics ===
- Magnus, Robot Fighter / Nexus #1–2 (1993–1994)

Preceded by n/a	Nexus penciller 1983–1986	Succeeded by Mike Mignola
Preceded by Jackson Guice	Nexus penciller 1987–1989	Succeeded by Greg Guler
