= Swords of the Swashbucklers =

Publication information
- Publisher: Marvel Comics
- Format: Graphic novel (Marvel Graphic Novel); Limited series (Epic Comics)
- Genre: Science fiction
- No. of issues: 1 (Marvel Graphic Novel); 12 (Epic Comics)

Creative team
- Created by: Bill Mantlo; Jackson Guice
- Written by: Bill Mantlo
- Artist(s): Jackson Guice (GN, #1-4); Geof Isherwood (#5-8, 10, 12); Colleen Doran (#9, 11)

Collected editions
- Sword of the Swashbucklers hardcover: ISBN 1524106216

Swords of the Swashbucklers is an American comic book series created by Bill Mantlo and Jackson Guice, that first appeared in the Marvel Graphic Novel range. Epic Comics, a division of Marvel Comics, began publishing it as a twelve-issue limited series between March 1985 and March 1987. In 2018, Dynamite Entertainment published a sequel limited series Swashbucklers: The Saga Continues.

Within the Marvel Comics multiverse, the Swords of the Swashbucklers reality is designated as Earth-21394.

== Publication history ==
Number	Title	Published	Writers	Artists	Notes
Officially numbered titles
0	Marvel Graphic Novel #14	October 1984	Bill Mantlo	Jackson Guice	
1	Shock Waves	March 1985	Bill Mantlo	Jackson Guice	
2	…And a Child Will Lead Them	July 1985	Bill Mantlo	Jackson Guice	
3	Adrift	September 1985	Bill Mantlo	Jackson Guice	
4	The Weirdling!	November 1985	Bill Mantlo	Jackson Guice	
5	A House Divided	January 1986	Bill Mantlo	Geof Isherwood	
6	Run For Cover!	March 1986	Bill Mantlo	Geof Isherwood	
7	Rats	March 1986	Bill Mantlo	Geof Isherwood	
8	Bog-Thing	May 1986	Bill Mantlo	Geof Isherwood	
9	Starmaps	September 1986	Bill Mantlo	Colleen Doran	
10	The Prince	November 1986	Bill Mantlo	Geof Isherwood	
11	Whatever Happened to Black Bess?	December 1986	Bill Mantlo	Colleen Doran	
12	The Memory	March 1987	Bill Mantlo	Geof Isherwood	

== Plot synopsis ==
Swords of the Swashbucklers is set in an alternate dimension to Earth in which the inhabitants resemble Earth's pirates of old. A powerful, evil race of aliens known as the Colonizers controls the dimension while rebel "Swashbucklers" rob and pillage their oppressors so that they might survive. In one battle, The Admiral of the Colonizers' armada, J'Rel discovers Earth and kidnaps two humans. The couple's daughter, Domino Blackthorne Drake, finds the "Swashbucklers" and agrees to use her unique powers to fight the Colonizers if the Pirate Queen, Captain Raader, and her crew should help her to rescue her parents. The series chronicles the ensuing battles and the adventures of the "Swashbucklers" and their two charismatic female leaders.

== Collected editions ==
In 2018, Dynamite Entertainment published a complete collection of the original graphic novel and twelve-issue series (ISBN 1524106216).

== Sources ==
- "Marvel Graphic Novels 14". Grand Comics Database.
- Swords of the Swashbucklers at the Grand Comics Database
