= Jackson Guice =

American artist (1961–2025)

- Born: June 27, 1961 Chattanooga, Tennessee, U.S.
- Died: May 1, 2025 (aged 63) Cincinnati, Ohio, U.S.
- Areas: Penciller, Inker
- Pseudonym: Butch Guice
- Notable works: Action Comics; The Flash; Micronauts; Ruse; Apocalypse
- Awards: Inkpot Award (2015)

Jackson "Butch" Guice (June 27, 1961 – May 1, 2025) was an American comics artist who worked in the comics industry beginning in the 1980s. He drew Micronauts, Swords of the Swashbucklers, X-Factor, The New Mutants, and Iron Man for Marvel Comics. His work for DC Comics included "The Death of Superman" storyline as well as the co-creation of the Resurrection Man with writers Andy Lanning and Dan Abnett.

== Life and career ==
Guice was born in Chattanooga, Tennessee, on June 27, 1961. Growing up in the 1960s, Guice was fond of "the legendary stop-motion animator and filmmaker" Ray Harryhausen, whose influence can be seen in some of Guice's work, most notably the Humanoids project Olympus.

=== 1980s ===
Guice began his career with fanzine work and "designing patches and emblems for a small company in North Carolina." His first credited comics work was penciling and inking the independently published The Crusaders #1 (November 1982), although he had previously ghosted for Pat Broderick on Rom Annual #1 (1982). On the strength of his fanzine work, (and, Guice believes, at the behest of Rom writer Bill Mantlo) Marvel editor Al Milgrom offered him a tryout on the toy-spin-off title Micronauts. Referring to Rom Annual #1 and Micronauts #48 (Dec. 1982), he remarked that "[b]oth were breaking points for me getting into comics".

Guice continued penciling Micronauts until #58 (May 1984). In July 1983, "The Butch Guice Portfolio" appeared in the pages of Marvel Fanfare #9, and Guice contributed to The Official Handbook of the Marvel Universe, Chris Claremont and Bill Mantlo's X-Men and the Micronauts four-issue miniseries as well as occasional issues of a number of different titles. In 1984, he drew the Marvel Comics adaptation of Indiana Jones and the Temple of Doom and inked Dazzler. In 1986, he penciled X-Factor, while concurrently contributing pencils to The New Mutants. In mid-1987, he was credited with inks to "Brian Guice" 's pencils for five issues of Adventure Publications' Adventurers, which was written and edited by Scott Behnke. That same year, Guice collaborated on several different titles with writer Mike Baron, including issues of First Comics' Badger, Nexus and The Chronicles of Corum. Guice worked with Baron on projects for DC Comics. He penciled Teen Titans Spotlight #7 and #8, before gaining more popularity among DC readers with his work on the relaunched, post-Crisis on Infinite Earths The Flash #1. This third Flash series featured Wally West after the demise of Barry Allen in the Crisis on Infinite Earths series. Guice drew ten of the first eleven issues.

In 1988–89, Guice produced a series of covers for the Quality Comics/Fleetway 2000 AD reprint-title 2000AD Showcase, while penciling the Iron Man title for Marvel. In 1989 he became the artist on Doctor Strange, Sorcerer Supreme.

=== 1990s ===
Guice's cover for Doctor Strange #15 (March 1990) used Christian music singer Amy Grant's likeness without her permission, leading to her management filing a complaint against Marvel Comics, saying the cover gave the appearance she was associating with witchcraft. A US District Court sealed an out-of-court settlement between Grant and Marvel in early 1991, with a consent decree that Marvel did not admit to any liability or wrongdoing.

Guice and writer Walt Simonson co-created the Ahab character in Fantastic Four Annual #23 (1990). In 1991, Guice took over penciling Nick Fury, Agent of S.H.I.E.L.D., before moving back to DC. Guice drew Action Comics #676–711 (April 1992–July 1995) and worked with writers Roger Stern and David Michelinie. During this run, Guice and Stern (along with editor Mike Carlin, Dan Jurgens, Louise Simonson and others) were the architects of "The Death of Superman" storyline, in which Superman died and was resurrected. Stern and Guice incorporated the Eradicator character into the "Reign of the Supermen" story arc beginning in The Adventures of Superman #500 (June 1993). Spinning out of that event, Stern and Guice collaborated on a Supergirl miniseries.

While drawing Action Comics, he also worked with writer James Robinson on Dark Horse Comics' The Terminator: Endgame miniseries (September–October 1992), and with Chris Claremont on the first four issues of the Aliens/Predator: The Deadliest of the Species (July 1993–January 1994).

Towards the end of 1995, Guice moved to Valiant Comics, becoming the regular penciller of Eternal Warrior. Guice penciled part of the Sliders: Narcotica comic book, based on the TV series Sliders and written by the show's star Jerry O'Connell. Having Guice draw the series was:

"a personal treat for Jerry [O'Connell] as "Butch" Guice (as he used to be called during his successful run at Marvel Comics) was a favorite of his during his comic-reading years."

Guice illustrated the four-issue DC/Marvel: All Access mini-series (December 1996–February 1997) follow-up to the cross-company DC Versus Marvel/Marvel Versus DC event. He was one of many artists to contribute to the landmark marriage of Superman and Lois Lane in Superman: The Wedding Album (December 1996). In May 1997, Guice launched Resurrection Man with writers Dan Abnett and Andy Lanning, pencilling all 27 issues and inking most of them including the special #1,000,000 issue for the DC One Million event. The series was cancelled in August 1999.

=== 2000s ===
In March 2000, Guice became the artist on Birds of Prey for issues #15 to #34. In addition, Guice drew a "Robin and Oracle" story in Batman: Gotham City Secret Files and Origins and the Universe X Spidey one-shot, from Marvel. After his run on Birds of Prey, Guice left DC Comics and moved to Tampa, Florida to work for CrossGen. He was brought in to launch Ruse with writer Mark Waid, in November 2001. Effectively a Victorian steampunk detective story, although set on an analogue of Earth in the far-distant future, and part of CrossGen's 'Sigilverse'. Guice continued as the penciller of Ruse until its cancellation with #26 (January 2004). Guice resigned from CrossGen "just prior to the layoffs" and before the remaining staff were released from "exclusivity status".

Writer Geoff Johns, "one of Humanoids' biggest supporters from the very beginning of [their] US publishing program," pitched a story with Kris Grimminger featuring "every great monster from Greek mythology, from Medusa to the Stymphalian Birds." Humanoids editor Paul Benjamin began the search "throughout the world for a great artist who would appeal to both an American and a European audience. Butch was always on our mind for the book, but he was busy drawing Ruse for CrossGen. We began talking to Butch once he became available and Olympus was a perfect fit."

Guice said of Humanoids and Olympus:

"I've been interested in working with Paul Benjamin and Humanoids for several years now... [their] approach to their material, both in quality and design of product as well as the extensive worldwide market they've cultivated with a variety of genres, held enormous interest for me. After my resignation from the CrossGen staff, I contacted Paul and we started talking about possibilities. Once I read the two scripts for Olympus, I knew it was exactly the type of thing I would enjoy drawing. Having it be written by Geoff and Kris was a very pleasurable bonus."

Although intended as two volumes, to date, only the first has seen print. This is likely due to the lapsing of Humanoids US-distribution deal with DC, as Guice said in December 2003, while working on Volume One that that book "wraps in March [2004]", which he then "scheduled to start work on volume two almost immediately".

After leaving CrossGen, Guice worked with writer Warren Ellis on a six-issue story-arc entitled "New Maps of Hell" for DC's JLA: Classified title and then worked on the "One Year Later" revamp of Aquaman, in Kurt Busiek's Aquaman: Sword of Atlantis, debuting with #40 of the previous Aquaman title. Guice stayed for eight issues, and Busiek said of his artist colleague:

"Aside from being a terrific artist and strong storyteller, Butch can really make you believe in the exotic fantasy worlds of the Atlantic oceanscape. And he draws a great King Shark -- and a creepy Dweller, to boot. And cool warriors, gorgeous women, strange creatures and more. He's the perfect guy for this book, and I've wanted to work with him for years."

In 2007, Guice provided rotating art duties for The Invincible Iron Man, with issue #19–20's World War Hulk tie-in issue and became inker on Captain America for #32–34, and then taking over full duties as of #35. Guice penciled a miniseries taking place in the Ultimate Universe, entitled Ultimate Origins written by Brian Michael Bendis. Bendis wrote of Guice "I've been a fan of his for years and years, and when I saw what he was doing in Iron Man [with Gage]... I had to have him." Guice was the penciler on the Wildstorm mini-series Storming Paradise, written by Chuck Dixon.

=== Personal life and death ===
Guice and his wife Julie had a daughter named Elizabeth Diane, born in 1988. He died of pneumonia on May 1, 2025, at the age of 63. He was a resident of Reading, Ohio, at the time of his death.

== Awards ==
Guice received an Inkpot Award in 2015.

== Bibliography ==
Comics work (interior art) includes:

=== DC Comics ===
- Action Comics #676–681, 683–698, 700–711, #0, #1000 (1992–1995, 2018)
- Adventure Comics 80-Page Giant #1 (1998)
- Adventures of Superman #500, 509, 516 (1993–1994)
- Agent Liberty Special #1 (1992)
- Aquaman: Sword of Atlantis #40–47 (2006–2007)
- Birds of Prey #15–26, 28–30, 33–34 (2000–2001)
- The Death of Superman 30th Anniversary Special #1 (2023)
- The Flash vol. 2 #1–9, 11, Annual #1 (1987–1988)
- JLA: Classified #10–15 (2005–2006)
- Metropolis S.C.U. #1–4 (1994–1995)
- Resurrection Man #1–27, #1,000,000 (1997–1999)
- Supergirl vol. 3 #1–4 (1994)
- Supergirl/Lex Luthor Special #1 (1993)
- Superman vol. 2 #64 (1992)
- Superman: The Man of Steel #38 (1994)
- Superman: The Wedding Album #1 (1996)
- Tangent Comics The Superman #1 (1998)
- Superman Y2K #1
- Teen Titans Spotlight #7–8 (1987)
- Who's Who in the DC Universe Update 1993 #1–2 (1992–1993)
- Who's Who Update '87 #2–3 (1987)
- Who's Who Update '88 #1 (1988)

=== DC Comics / Marvel Comics ===
- DC/Marvel All Access #1–4 (1996–1997)

=== Marvel Comics ===
- The Amazing Spider-Man Annual #18, 22 (1984–1988)
- The Avengers Annual #12, 16 (1983–1987)
- Avengers Assemble #14-15 (2013)
- Black Panther and the Crew #1-6 (2017)
- Captain America vol. 5 #32–37, 45, 47–48 (2008–2009)
- Captain America #600, 602-610, 612-615, 617-619 (2009–2011)
- Captain America: Reborn #1–6 (2009–2010)
- Captain America: Reborn: Who Will Wield the Shield? #1 (2010)
- Captain Marvel vol. 3 #3 (2008)
- Dazzler #38–41 (1985–1986)
- Deathlok #1–2 (1990)
- Deathlok vol. 2 #8, Annual #1 (1992)
- Doctor Strange Sorcerer Supreme #5–16, 18, 20–24 (1989–1990)
- Fantastic Four #286, Annual #21, 23 (1986–1990)
- Heroes for Hope #1 (1986)
- The Hunt for Wolverine: Claws of a Killer #1-4 (2018)
- Immortal Hulk #34 (2020)
- Invaders vol. 3 #1-2, 4-12 (2019-2020)
- The Invincible Iron Man #19–20, 23–25 (2007–2008)
- Iron Man #231, 233–240, Annual #10 (1988–1989)
- Marvel Comics Presents #62 (1990)
- Marvel Comics Super Special #30 (1984)
- Marvel Fanfare #9, 45 (1983–1989)
- Marvel Graphic Novel #14 (1984)
- Micronauts #48–58 (1982–1984)
- New Mutants #40–42, 44–48, 50 (1986–1987)
- Nick Fury, Agent of S.H.I.E.L.D. #20–28 (1991)
- Official Handbook of the Marvel Universe #5, 7–8, 10 (1983)
- Official Handbook of the Marvel Universe Deluxe Edition #3, 6, 8–9, 11, 14 (1986–1987)
- Rom #61 (1984)
- Savage Avengers #11 (2010)
- Secret Avengers #6–7, 9, 12–14 (2013–2014)
- Swords of the Swashbucklers #1–4 (1984–1985)
- Thor: God of Thunder #6 (2013)
- Ultimate Origins #1–5 (2008)
- Uncanny X-Men #216–217 (1987)
- Universe X: Spidey #1 (2001)
- What If #40 (1983)
- Wild Cards #1–4 (1990)
- Winter Soldier #1–5, 10–14 (2012–2013)
- X-Factor #1–3, 5–7 (1986)
- X-Factor: Prisoner of Love #1 (1990)
- X-Men and the Micronauts #1–4 (1984)

=== Other publishers ===
- Aliens/Predator: Deadliest of the Species #1-4 (Dark Horse Comics, 1993-1994)
- Archangel #1-4 (IDW Publishing, 2016-2017)
- Bloodshot #40 (Valiant Comics, 1995)
- Bloodshot Reborn #6-9 (Valiant Entertainment, 2015)
- Eternal Warrior #39-40, 43-44, 47-50 (Valiant Comics, 1995-1996)
- Ninjak #1-5 (Valiant Entertainment, 2015)
- Olympus OGN (Humanoids Publishing, 2005)
- Overstreet Comic Book Price Guide Volume 52 (Winter Soldier cover art) (Gemstone Publishing, 2022)
- Ruse #1-5, 7-10, 12-14, 16-19, 21-24, 26 (Crossgen Comics, 2001–2004)
- Sliders Special: Narcotica #1 (Acclaim Comics, 1996)
- Terminator: Endgame #1-3 (Dark Horse Comics, 1992)
- Turok, Dinosaur Hunter #45-46 (Valiant Comics, 1996)
- Winterworld #1-4 (IDW Publishing, 2014)
- X-O Manowar #67-68 (Valiant Comics, 1996)

Preceded by Mike Vosburg	Micronauts artist 1982–1984	Succeeded by Kelley Jones
Preceded by n/a	X-Factor artist 1986	Succeeded by Walt Simonson
Preceded by Keith Pollard	New Mutants artist 1986–1987	Succeeded by Kevin Nowlan
Preceded by n/a	The Flash vol. 2 artist 1987–1988	Succeeded by Mike Collins
Preceded by Barry Windsor-Smith	Iron Man artist 1988–1989	Succeeded by Denys Cowan
Preceded by Bob McLeod	Action Comics artist 1992–1995	Succeeded by Kieron Dwyer
