= Mike Baron =

American comic book writer

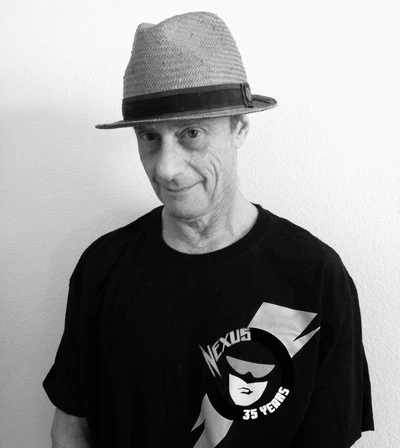
- Baron in 2018
- Born: Michael A. Baron; July 1, 1949 (age 77)
- Area: Writer
- Notable works: Nexus; Badger; The Flash; The Punisher
- Awards: Inkpot Award 1988; Eisner Award for Best Writer/Artist 1993

Mike Baron (born July 1, 1949) is an American comic book writer and novelist. He is the creator of Badger and the co-creator of Nexus with Steve Rude. He is also well known as the first writer on Marvel Comics' The Punisher ongoing series, and the second volume of DC Comics' The Flash.

== Biography ==
Mike Baron entered the comics industry with an illustrated text piece in Weird Trips Magazine #1 (March 1974) published by Kitchen Sink Press. In 1981, he published his first formal comics script with Nexus, the science fiction title he co-created with illustrator Steve Rude; the series garnered numerous honors, including Eisner Awards for both creators. A prolific creator, Baron is responsible for The Badger, Ginger Fox, Spyke, Feud, and many other comic book properties. He and artist Jackson Guice relaunched The Flash in June 1987, when Wally West took on the mantle at DC Comics. Also in 1987, Baron launched and wrote the first ongoing Punisher series at Marvel Comics, remaining on the title for over five years. During that acclaimed run, he and Klaus Janson introduced the character Microchip as an ally of The Punisher in The Punisher #4 (November 1987).

In 1988, Baron wrote the "Deadman" feature in Action Comics Weekly which led to two subsequent Deadman limited series. Baron has also written numerous other mainstream characters including Batman and several Star Wars adaptations for Dark Horse Comics. In 2014, Baron published Biker, his first novel, about reformed motorcycle hoodlum Josh Pratt. 'Biker' was the first in his 'Bad Road Rising' series. Liberty Island Press has since released six Josh Pratt novels, along with Baron's Disco, a story about a boy and his dog. In independent comics, Mike Baron has created Florida Man, Thin Blue Line, Private American, Bronze Star - a weird western with Pat Broderick, and Q-Ball, a martial arts comic with Barry McClain Jr.

=== Influences ===
Baron has listed Carl Barks and Philip José Farmer as influences on his fiction writing.

== Awards ==
Mike Baron has been nominated for Best Writer in the Kirby, Harvey, and Eisner Awards. He was awarded with an Inkpot Award in 1988, and has won multiple Eisners ("Best Single Issue" and "Best Writer/Artist Team" both with Rude) for his work on Nexus.

== Bibliography ==
=== Advent Comics ===
- Buddy McGill #1-2 (2023)

=== Alien Books / Valiant Comics ===
- Nexus: Scourge #1-2 (2024-2025)

=== American Mythology Productions ===
- Florida Man #1-3 (2022)
- Florida Man vs. Hogzilla #1-3 (2024)

=== Antarctic Press ===
- Thin Blue Line (One-Shot) (2024)
- Private American #1-3 (2025)

=== BIG Comics ===
- Florida Man OGN (2021)
- Thin Blue Line OGN (2022)
- Private American OGN (2023)
- Bronze Star OGN (2023)
- Florida Man vs. Hogzilla OGN (2024)
- Nexus: Scourge OGN (2024)

=== Capital Comics ===
- Badger #1–4 (1983–1984)
- Nexus #1–3 (1981–1982)
- Nexus vol. 2 #1–6 (1983–1984)

=== Dark Horse Comics ===
- Badger: Shattered Mirror #1–4 (1994)
- Badger: Zen Pop Funny-Animal Version #1–2 (1994)
- Dark Horse Presents #84 (1994)
- Dark Horse Presents vol. 3 #12–14, 23–26 (2012–2013)
- Godzilla vs. Barkley (1993)
- Nexus #89–98 (1996–1997)
- Nexus: Alien Justice #1–3 (1992–1993)
- Nexus: The Origin #1 (1992)
- Nexus: The Wages of Sin #1–4 (1995)
- Star Wars: Dark Force Rising #1–6 (1997)
- Star Wars: Heir to the Empire #1–6 (1995–1996)
- Star Wars: The Last Command #1–6 (1997–1998)
- X-wing Rogue Squadron: The Rebel Opposition #1–4 (1995)
- Nexus: Nefarious OGN (2023)

=== DC Comics ===
- Action Comics Weekly #601–612, 618–621, 623–626 (1988)
- All-Star Squadron #43 (1985)
- Atari Force #14–20 (1985)
- Batman Annual #12 (1988)
- Batman: Legends of the Dark Knight #154–155 (2002)
- The Brave and the Bold vol. 2 #1–6 (1991–1992)
- The Butcher #1–5 (1990)
- Deadman: Exorcism #1–2 (1992–1993)
- Deadman: Love After Death #1–2 (1989–1990)
- Elvira's House of Mystery #8 (1986)
- The Flash vol. 2 #1–14, Annual #1 (1987–1988)
- Green Lantern vol. 2 #187 (1985)
- Green Lantern Corps Quarterly #6 (1993)
- Hawk and Dove vol. 4 #1–5 (1997–1998)
- Justice League Unlimited #30 (2007)
- Ms. Tree Quarterly #2–3 (1990–1991)
- Question Quarterly #5 (1992)
- Showcase '93 #6–11 (1993)
- Sonic Disruptors #1–7 (1987–1988)
- Teen Titans Spotlight #7–8 (1987)

=== First Comics ===
- Badger #5–70 (1985–1991)
- Badger Bedlam #1 (1991)
- Badger Goes Berserk #1–4 (1989)
- The Chronicles of Corum #1–9 (1987–1988)
- Crossroads #2, 5 (1988)
- Hammer of God #1–4 (1990)
- Hexbreaker: A Badger Graphic Novel (1988)
- Nexus vol. 2 #7–80 (1985–1991)
- The Next Nexus #1–4 (1989)
- Badger: Mad Monkey Shock 'N' Roll #1–5 (2025)

=== Malibu Comics ===
- Bruce Lee #1–6 (1995–1996)

=== Marvel Comics ===
- Amazing High Adventure #3, 5 (1986)
- Conan the Savage #8 (1996)
- Epic Illustrated #33 (1985)
- Feud #1–4 (1993)
- Heavy Hitters Annual #1 (1993)
- Heroes for Hope starring the X-Men #1 (1985)
- Marvel Graphic Novel: The Punisher: Intruder (1989)
- The Punisher #1–44, 46–48, 50–62, 76, Annual #1–4 (1987–1993)
- The Punisher: Empty Quarter #1 (1994)
- The Punisher War Journal #16, 25–37 (1990–1991)
- The Punisher: G-Force #1 (1992)
- The Punisher: Origin of Micro Chip #1–2 (1993)
- Spyke #1–4 (1993)
- Strange Tales: Dark Corners #1 (1998)
- Tales of the Marvels: Blockbuster #1 (1995)
- What If...? #83 (1996)

=== Rippaverse Comics ===
- Goodyng: The Polymath #1 (2024)

=== Rude Dude Productions ===
- Nexus: Space Opera #1–4 (2007–2009)

=== Valiant Comics ===
- Archer & Armstrong #13–15, 17–25 (1993–1994)
- Eternal Warrior #25–26 (1994)
- H.A.R.D. Corps #25–30 (1995)
- Magnus, Robot Fighter Yearbook #1 (1994)
- Magnus Robot Fighter/Nexus #1–2 (1994)
- Ninjak #10, Yearbook #1 (1994)
- Shadowman #35–36 (1995)
- Turok, Dinosaur Hunter #10–12, 16, 28, Yearbook #1 (1994–1995)

Preceded by n/a	The Flash vol. 2 writer 1987–1988	Succeeded by William Messner-Loebs
Preceded by n/a	The Punisher vol. 2 writer 1987–1993	Succeeded by Dan Abnett and Andy Lanning
