= Badger (comics) =

Independently released Superhero comic books

- Norbert Sykes as Badger. Badger #25, published by First Comics.

Publication information
- Publisher: IDW Publishing (current); formerly: Capital Comics, First Comics, Dark Horse Comics, Image Comics
- First appearance: Badger #1 (July 1983)
- Created by: Mike Baron

In-story information
- Alter ego: Norbert Sykes
- Species: Human
- Abilities: Expert martial artist and talking to animals

Badger is a superhero in American comic books published by the short-lived Capital Comics company and then First Comics. He was created by writer Mike Baron in 1983 and published through the early 1990s in a titular series that ended when First Comics also ceased all publications. Since the ongoing series ended in 1991, new Badger titles have been released sporadically through Dark Horse Comics, Image Comics, IDW Publishing, and Devil's Due Publishing.

== Publication history ==
The first four issues of Badger were published by Capital Comics (under the name Badger), beginning in 1983. Capital ceased publishing in 1984, and in 1985 Baron took his creation to First Comics to then be illustrated by artist Bill Reinhold. First reprinted the first four issues, and then published monthly issues of Badger, including the Hexbreaker graphic novel in 1988. A spin-off four-issue miniseries ran concurrently with the regular series in 1989, called Badger Goes Berserk, which explored Norbert's childhood and his abuse at the hands of his stepfather and stepbrother, now white supremacists who he encountered again in the miniseries. Badger sometimes guest-starred in Mike Baron's other series, the space opera Nexus, which took place in the future. Badger would imagine these episodes to be psychotic hallucinations, which he took in stride as being no more bizarre than the rest of his life. In 1991, First Comics published Badger Bedlam, a one-shot "First Publishing Deluxe-Format Special" by Baron, Butler, and Ken Branch, but then went bankrupt and the series ended with #70. Badger also featured in First's five-issue Crossroads series. Artists who worked on Badger in its 1980s run included Jeff Butler, Steven Butler, Bill Reinhold, Chas Truog, Jackson Guice, Mike Mignola, Gary Chaloner, Tim Vigil and Ron Lim.

In 1994, Dark Horse Comics published two miniseries featuring different versions of Badger's origin: the four-issue Badger: Shattered Mirror, a "serious" take on Badger's origin, and the two-issue Badger: Zen Pop Funny-Animal Version. These were deliberately written to be mutually exclusive.

In 1997, Image Comics began publishing a black and white fourth Badger series, whose narrative connection to the previous versions was not entirely clear. This series ran for eleven issues.

The series returned November 2007, published by IDW Publishing. This consists of a reprint series of trade paperbacks of old issues, as well two new Badger stories: a one shot, Badger: Bull, followed by a miniseries, Badger Saves the World which started in December 2007.

In 2013, Bluewater Productions published Crossed Wires, a four-issue miniseries that saw 10th Muse cross over with Badger, Bomb Queen, and Judo Girl. Badger returned in a five-issue miniseries published by Devil's Due Publishing in 2016.

== Fictional character biography ==
Badger was mostly set in Madison, Wisconsin, where Capital Comics was situated. The lead character was Norbert Sykes, a Vietnam War veteran suffering from multiple personality disorder. "Badger", an urban vigilante who could talk to animals, was just one of his personalities. Bizarrely, he would often call people "Larry", and it was later revealed that "Larry" was the name of his father who left his mother when Norbert was five. His mother remarried to Rollin Sykes who physically abused Norbert. After escaping from a mental institution, Norbert met a 5th-century Druid named Ham (Hammaglystwythkbrngxxaxolotl in full), who had just awakened from an 800-year coma (this was later corrected in dialogue where it was noted that Ham's coma lasted 1500 years). Ham took Badger in as a boarder in his castle in return for Badger's bodyguard services. Other characters included Norbert's caseworker Daisy, Vietnamese martial arts expert (and Norbert's wife) Mavis, and Lord Weterlackus, a demon who empowered Ham until they had a falling-out. Prior to his coma, Ham would sacrifice children in his castle in Wales (Ham was placed in a mystical coma for 1500 years by all the other wizards), but after his resurrection he would sacrifice animals (which enraged Badger) or computer files. Ham would use his power over weather to influence markets and generate wealth for himself; occasionally his supernatural dealings would bring him into conflict with demons, whom Badger would then be called upon to fight.

== Personalities of Badger ==
- Norbert Sykes: This is his legal identity.
- Badger: A martial arts expert (4th or 5th dan in Shōrin-ryū karate, plus many other arts) costumed vigilante dispensing bare-fisted justice to bullies and aggressors of the innocent, but according to his own warped perceptions, he often defends animals or environmental causes.
- Emily: 9-year-old girl, she is related to childhood abuse at the hands of Sykes' stepfather Rollin Sykes.
- Pierre: Homicidal personality who speaks with a French accent, he first appeared when Ham tried to awaken Sykes from his first Emily personality transformation.
- Leroy: Sykes had a dog named Leroy that his father Larry beat to death.
- Gastineau Grover Depaul: Urban African American, he is unaware of the other personalities.
- Max Swell is an architect. Early on, Max was written as a modern epicurean and sophisticated playboy, but appeared to morph into a stereotypical gay man later in the series.

== Collected editions ==
The various comics are collected as trade paperbacks published by IDW Publishing:

- The Complete Badger:
  - Volume 1 (176 pages, November 2007, ISBN 1-60010-129-1) (collecting issues #1–6)
  - Volume 2 (152 pages, March 2008, ISBN 1-60010-160-7) (collecting issues #7-12)
  - Volume 3 (132 pages, June 2008, ISBN 1-60010-220-4) (collecting issues #13–18)
  - Volume 4 (144 pages, September 2008, ISBN 1-60010-235-2) (collecting issues #19–23)
- Badger Saves the World (152 pages, July 2008, ISBN 1-60010-186-0)
