= Nexus (comics) =

Comic book series

- Nexus – Nightmare in Blue #4 (October 1997)

Publication information
- Publisher: Capital Comics; First Comics; Dark Horse Comics; Rude Dude Productions
- Format: Mini-series; Ongoing series
- Genre: Science fiction Superhero
- Publication date: January 1981 – October 1982; May 1983 – May 1991; 1992 – 1997
- No. of issues: 100+

Creative team
- Written by: Mike Baron
- Penciller: Steve Rude

Collected editions
- Volume 1: ISBN 1-59307-398-4

Nexus is an American comic book series created by writer Mike Baron and penciler Steve Rude in 1981. The series is a combination of the superhero and science fiction genres, set 500 years in the future.

== Publication history ==
The series debuted as a three-issue black-and-white limited series (the third of which featured a 33 RPM flexi disc with music and dialogue from the issue), followed by an ongoing full-color series which lasted 80 issues. The black-and-white issues and the first six color issues were published by Capital Comics; after Capital’s demise, First Comics took over publication.

On the creation of the series, Baron noted that they had originally pitched a series called Encyclopaedias to Capital Comics, but the company rejected this, saying they were looking for a superhero title. Over a drink at a restaurant, Baron outlined his ideas for Nexus to Rude:

Nexus was entirely Baron’s idea. He even came up with the lightning bolt for the costume. All that we needed then was a name... a few weeks passed. Baron calls, and, without preamble, just says "Nexus". We finally had our name.

In addition to the ongoing series, First reprinted the original miniseries as a graphic novel and later reprinted the first two years of the ongoing title in the Nexus Legends series. The ongoing series was also supplemented by The Next Nexus, a four-issue miniseries that followed Nexus #52. Following the conclusion of the ongoing series with #80 (May 1991), seven miniseries and two one-shot comics were published by Dark Horse Comics. The last of these miniseries was printed in black and white as a cost-cutting measure; low sales led to the series being discontinued. Although each miniseries had its own issue numbering, Baron and Rude added a sequential number to each, as explained in the back of the first issue of Nexus: Executioner’s Song:

The current issue number was figured by continuing First Publishing’s numbering, which ended at volume 2, #80. Adding Nexus: The Origin, Nexus: Alien Justice #1–3, and Nexus: The Wages of Sin #1–4 brings it up to 88 — making "Dark Side of the Moon" #89.

The sequential numbering system excluded Nexus the Liberator (which neither Rude nor Baron worked on), and crossover specials with Magnus: Robot Fighter and Madman.

Baron and Rude discussed plans to either revive the series or release a movie, possibly in animated form (a brief animated test clip was shown at comics conventions). From July 2007 through July 2009 they published the miniseries Space Opera, which culminated in a double-size issue #101/102.

The creators’ canonical publication list includes 105 issues:

- Volume 1 (Black and White): #1–#3
- Volume 2: #1–#80
- The Next Nexus #1-#4 (1989)
- Nexus: The Origin (#81)
- Nexus: Alien Justice (#82–#84)
- Nexus: Wages of Sin (#85–#88)
- Nexus: Executioner’s Song (#89–#92)
- Nexus: God Con (#93–#94)
- Nexus: Nightmare in Blue (#95–#98)
- Nexus: Space Opera (#99–#102)

The series returned to publication in 2012 within the pages of Dark Horse Presents.

- Dark Horse Presents #12–#14 (“Bad Moon Rising” and “Infestation”)
- Dark Horse Presents #23–#26, #29–#34 (“Into the Past”)

In 2019, Dark Horse announced The Coming of Gourmando, a collection of Nexus “newspaper strips”. The volume would finally see publication in 2021.

As of April 2022, Baron and Rude had parted ways and were working on separate Nexus projects. The first for Rude is 100 page Nexus story “Battle for Thuneworld”, originally intended to be completed in the fall of 2022.

Mike Baron has produced Nexus: Nefarious, one issue of proposed miniseries Nexus: Triplets, Nexus: A Novel, and the upcoming Nexus: Scourge

== Horatio Hellpop ==
The lead character, Horatio Valdemar Hellpop, received his Nexus powers from an alien entity called the Merk. As payment, the Merk required Nexus to seek out and kill a certain quantity of human mass murderers per "cycle". When the Merk selected a target, Nexus would receive strong headaches and maddeningly anguishing dreams (whose extremely intense episodes caused physical injuries to Hellpop's body that emulated the dream violence) of his target's victims until he did his duty. Horatio was reluctant to act as the Merk's tool, but continued seeking out mass murderers to maintain his power and his sanity so that he could defend his homeworld, a lunar refuge named Ylum (a shortening of the word "asylum", thus pronounced "eye-lum").

== Stylistic influence ==
Both Baron and Rude paid homage to Space Ghost in their work on Nexus, including use of the battle cry "This calls for hyperspeed!" and including Space Ghost characters Jan, Jayce, and Blip in several uncredited background cameos. Hanna-Barbera cartoon characters from Jonny Quest, The Herculoids and Magnus Robot Fighter along with his girlfriend Leeja Clane are frequently spotted in Nexus comics along with the occasional appearance of Captain Kirk and Mr. Spock from Star Trek. Rude was later hired to create a Space Ghost comic for Comico with writer Mark Evanier.

Steve Rude cited a number of influences on his clean, distinctive style, including Space Ghost character designs and other work by Alex Toth, Doug Wildey, Jack Kirby and commercial illustrators of the 1940s and 1950s, particularly Andrew Loomis. Rude occasionally does covers in the style of American illustrator Norman Rockwell.

Baron's Nexus stories responded to the world he was writing in, with competing merchants overwhelming media channels (and telepathy) with advertising. A great computerized library controlled the universe's memory of history. Some of his early 1980s references have become outdated, such as the menacing Sov Empire.

== Collected editions ==
Dark Horse Comics hardcover archive editions include:

- Nexus Archives, v1 (ISBN 1-59307-398-4, reprinted Nexus #1–3, v2 #1–4)
- Nexus Archives, v2 (ISBN 1-59307-455-7, reprinted Nexus v2 #5–11)
- Nexus Archives, v3 (ISBN 1-59307-495-6, reprinted Nexus v2 #12–18)
- Nexus Archives, v4 (ISBN 1-59307-583-9, reprinted Nexus v2 #19–25)
- Nexus Archives, v5 (ISBN 1-59307-584-7, reprinted Nexus v2 #26–32)
- Nexus Archives, v6 (ISBN 1-59307-791-2, reprinted Nexus v2 #33–39)
- Nexus Archives, v7 (ISBN 1-59307-877-3, reprinted Nexus v2 #40–46)
- Nexus Archives, v8 (ISBN 1-59582-236-4, reprinted Nexus v2 #47–52, Next Nexus #1)
- Nexus Archives, v9 (ISBN 1-59582-313-1, reprinted Nexus v2 #53–57, Next Nexus #2–4)
- Nexus Archives, v10 (ISBN 1-59582-438-3, reprinted Nexus v2 #58–65)
- Nexus Archives, v11 (ISBN 1-59582-496-0, reprinted Nexus v2 #66–73)
- Nexus Archives, v12 (ISBN 1-59582-636-X, reprinted Nexus v2 #74–80)

Rude Dude Productions:

- Nexus: Space Opera (ISBN 0-9792311-3-2, reprinted Nexus #99–102)
- Nexus: As It Happened, v1 (ISBN 0-9792311-5-9, reprinted Nexus #1–3, v2 #1–4)

Dark Horse Comics Softcover omnibus editions:

- Nexus Omnibus, v1 (ISBN 1-61655-034-1, reprinted Nexus v1 #1–3, Nexus v2 #1–11)
- Nexus Omnibus, v2 (ISBN 1-61655-035-X, reprinted Nexus v2 #12–25)
- Nexus Omnibus, v3 (ISBN 1-61655-036-8, reprinted Nexus v2 #26–39)
- Nexus Omnibus, v4 (ISBN 1-61655-037-6, reprinted Nexus v2 #40–52, Next Nexus #1)
- Nexus Omnibus, v5 (ISBN 1-61655-038-4, reprinted Nexus v2 #53–65, Next Nexus #2–4)
- Nexus Omnibus, v6 (ISBN 1-61655-473-8, reprinted Nexus v2 #66–80, The Nexus Files)
- Nexus Omnibus, v7 (ISBN 1-5067-0002-0, reprints Nexus: The Origin, Nexus: The Liberator #1–4, Nexus: Alien Justice #1–3, Hammer of the God: Pentathlon, Mezz: Galactic Tour 2494, Hammer of God: Butch #1–3, and the "Clonezone Special")
- Nexus Omnibus, v8 (ISBN 1-5067-0027-6, reprints Nexus: The Wages of Sin #1–4, Nexus: Executioner's Song #1–4, Nexus: God Con #1–2, Nexus: Nightmare in Blue #1–4, and Nexus meets Mad Man!)

== Reception ==
Martin A. Stever reviewed Nexus in Space Gamer/Fantasy Gamer No. 83. Stever commented that "the success of the book is due, in part, to its greatly detailed setting. Together Baron and Rude have fleshed out an entire future universe that is as rich and original as anything that I've seen in any medium".

=== Awards ===
The series won a total of six Eisner Awards. In 1988, the series won an award for Best Artist/Penciller/Inker or Penciller/Inker Team. 1992's Nexus: Origin won awards for Best Single Issue/Single Story, Best Writer/Artist, and Best Artist/Penciller/Inker or Penciller/Inker Team. In 1997, Nexus: Executioner's Song won Best Artist/Penciller/Inker or Penciller/Inker Team. In 2008, Todd Klein won Best Letterer/Lettering for his work on Nexus.

== Crossovers ==
The Nexus series produced several crossover issues, featuring characters from several other First series, including American Flagg!, Grimjack, Jon Sable: Freelance, Badger, Whisper and Dreadstar. An example of Nexus crossover issues is the series Crossroads, published in 1988. Following the switch in publishers from First to Dark Horse, Nexus crossed over with Madman (Nexus Meets Madman) and Magnus Robot Fighter (Magnus Robot Fighter/Nexus).

== Adaptations ==
In December 1994, it was reported that Hanna-Barbera was developing an animated film adaptation of Nexus titled Nexus: The Movie for a potential 1995 release. Due to certain traits of Nexus being comparable to an Assassin, development was curtailed by management with many who'd set up the Nexus project let go from the company.

On January 1, 2000, it was revealed that producer Jeff Kline was awaiting a pick-up order from the Fox Kids Network for a cel-animated Nexus series. While the production had gotten as far as scripting (with significant input from the comic's creators), the show was ultimately never produced. It has never been publicly confirmed why the network passed on the series, but the underperformance of Kline's previous production, Big Guy and Rusty the Boy Robot, may have been a contributing factor.

A 2-minute promo for a Nexus animated series was produced in 2004.
