= Steve Oliff =

American comic book artist (born 1954)

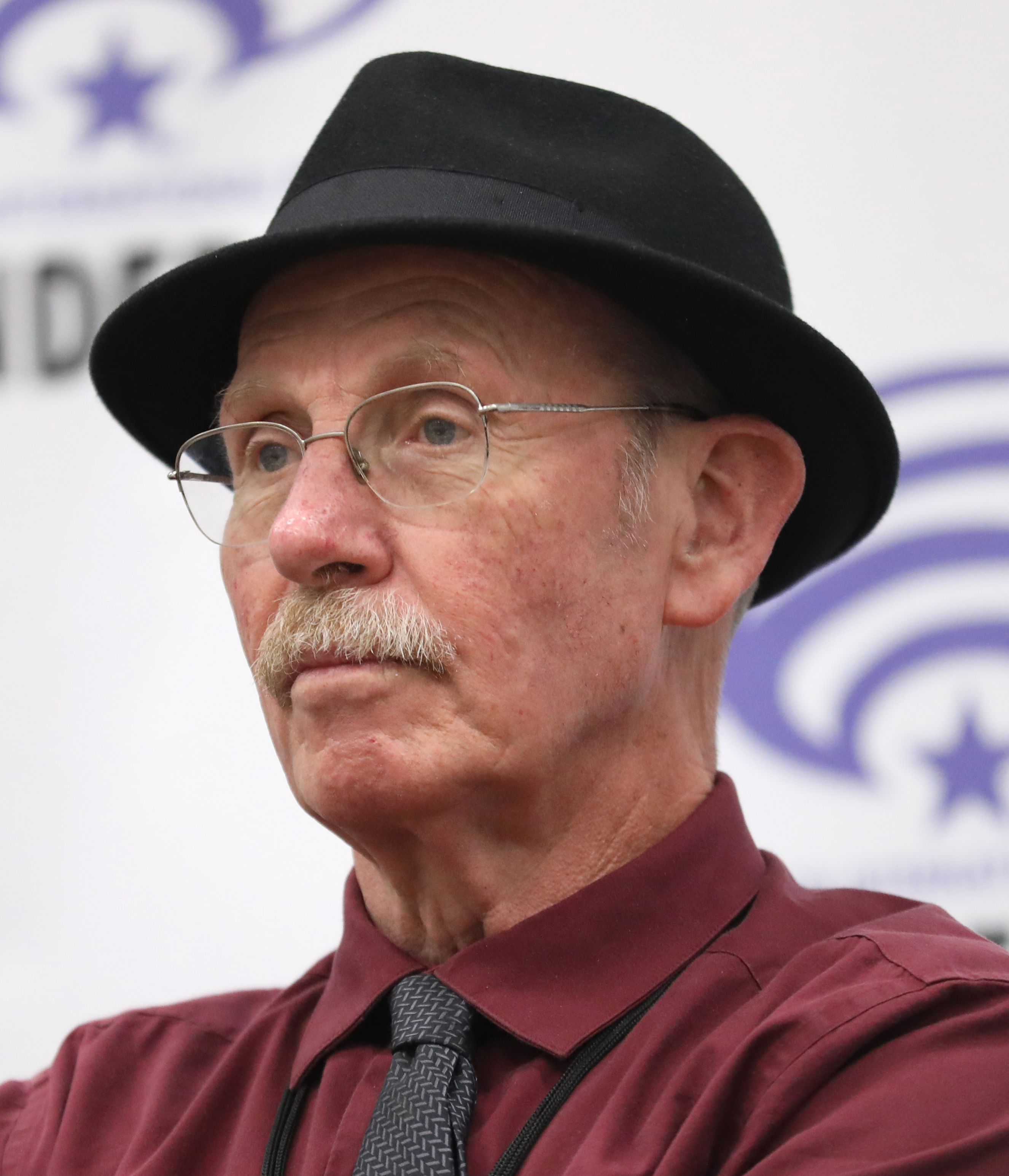
- Oliff at the 2024 WonderCon
- Born: February 20, 1954 (age 72)
- Areas: Writer, Colourist
- Notable works: Akira; Spawn
- Awards: "Best Colorist"; Eisner Award (1992–1994); Harvey Award (1990–1992, 1994–1995)

Steve Oliff (born February 20, 1954) is an American comic book artist who has worked as a colorist in the comics industry since 1978.

== Biography ==
Oliff broke into professional comics by attending comic book conventions and meeting people. At one convention he met publisher Byron Preiss. Preiss gave Oliff his first major coloring job (on a Shadowjack story in The Illustrated Roger Zelazny). More work with Preiss's publications followed, including a job on a Howard Chaykin graphic novel, which in turn led to Oliff getting his first Marvel Comics' job, coloring Bill Sienkiewicz's first Moon Knight story in The Hulk! magazine. From there Oliff went on to color hundreds of titles in a variety of coloring formats.

=== Olyoptics and Akira ===
His company, Olyoptics, was one of the first to use computers to do color separation. Although other companies at the time were experimenting with computers, Oliff and his crew were the first to blend the color guide artist with the separator

In 1987, the Japanese manga Akira was in preparation to be translated and published by Marvel Comics's Epic Comics line. Oliff was chosen as the colorist, and he convinced Marvel that it was time to try computer color. After the publication of Akira in 1988, computer coloring became increasingly prevalent in the comics industry. Oliff's work in Akira earned him an Eisner Award in 1992.

=== Writing ===
In addition to coloring thousands of comic pages for all sorts of companies, Oliff has written and illustrated two comic books, Armature and Armature: Darkpark and Lightworld, and is currently writing the third in his series. The Armature character first appeared in ads in Spawn and Youngblood comics, and in a back-up story in issue 14 of The Maxx. From 2003 to the present, Armature has been a weekly comic strip in Oliff's local newspaper, the Independent Coast Observer.

In 2005, Oliff collaborated with Cheri Carlstedt on a history of his hometown, Point Arena, California. The Early Days of Point Arena: A Pictorial History of the City and Township was published by Olyoptics. He also edits the Mendocino County Historical Society newsletter.

== Awards ==
Oliff won the "Best Colorist" Eisner Award in 1992, 1993 and 1994 and the "Best Colorist" Harvey Award in 1990, 1991, 1992, 1994 and 1995.

He was awarded the Inkpot Award in 1991.
