= List of fictional universes in animation and comics =

This is a partial list of fictional universes created for comic books and animated film and television.

== Animation ==
This is a partial list of fictional universes created for animated films or series.

Universe	Origin / first mentioned	Date	Notes
Adventure Time	Pilot	2007	The setting for multiple series created by Pendleton Ward, including Adventure Time, Adventure Time: Distant Lands, and Adventure Time: Fionna and Cake, as well as The Marvelous Misadventures of Flapjack, as the Fionna and Cake episode "Prismo the Wishmaster" mentions that Prismo created its universe. Primarily takes places in the Land of Ooo in a post-apocalyptic universe where a cataclysmic event called the Mushroom War devastated Earth.
Avatar	"The Boy in the Iceberg"	2005	A universe based around Asian culture, in which several people utilize elemental manipulation called "bending", which is incorporated in martial arts. The Avatar universe revolves around the Four Nations, the Air Nomads, Water Tribes, Earth Kingdom, and Fire Nation, as well as the sovereign state United Republic of Nations in the sequel series The Legend of Korra.
Brave series	Brave Exkaiser	1990	A multiverse developed by the Japanese toy company Takara that revolves around the usage of mechas called "Braves" to fight evil. The first series is Brave Exkaiser, with its final and most well-known series, The King of Braves GaoGaiGar, crossing over with the anime Betterman.
Ben 10	"And Then There Were Ten" (Ben 10)	2005	While Earth's history is not radically changed, numerous sentient alien species exist across various planets in the Milky Way galaxy and beyond. Earth was eventually revealed to have numerous cryptids, including chupacabra and yeti, with The Secret Saturdays existing in the same universe as Ben 10. Additionally, Generator Rex takes place in an alternate universe.
Bismark	"The Space Adventurers" (Bismark)	1984	Original TV series later adapted into Saber Rider and the Star Sheriffs in North America. In the original Bismark series, set in the distant future in the year 2069, scientist Charles Louvre created the international starship Bismarck to fight against the alien Deathcula. The localized version, Saber Rider and the Star Sheriffs, makes changes to better suit an American audience.
Bubblegum Crisis	"Tinsel City" (Bubblegum Crisis)	1987	A cyberpunk setting in the year 2032, where Tokyo has been split by an earthquake and the Advanced Police and the Knight Sabers, a group of mercenaries wearing power armor, fight the Boomers, artificial lifeforms that threaten the safety of those in Tokyo.
Bungholeverse	The Honky Problem	1991	Began with shorts created by Mike Judge, featuring characters such as Inbred Jed and Beavis and Butt-Head, later expanding to include Daria and Jodie. A mostly normal universe focusing on early millennial adolescents like the cynical Daria Morgendoffer and the buffoonish duo of Beavis and Butt-Head. Beavis and Butt-Head's antics would become much more outlandish in their two films, where they embark on shenanigans across America and the multiverse.
CN City		June 14, 2004	Short bumpers in which various Cartoon Network characters, including Ed, Edd n Eddy, The Grim Adventures of Billy & Mandy, Codename: Kids Next Door, Dexter's Laboratory, Courage the Cowardly Dog, I Am Weasel, and The Powerpuff Girls, interact. They predominantly take place in a city composed of various locales from the CN series, with a few original locations. The bumpers, along with a new logo and announcer, were introduced with a montage. The OK K.O.! Let's Be Heroes Season 2 episode "Crossover Nexus" implies that every animated character ever affiliated with Cartoon Network will eventually become a resident after their show is either finished or cancelled.
Code Geass	"The Day a New Demon was Born" (Code Geass)	2006	Set in an alternate timeline diverging from the reign of Queen Elizabeth I, who she bore a son named Henry IX. The world of Code Geass is based around three global superpowers; the Holy Britannian Empire, the Chinese Federation, and Europa United. The Britannian Empire occupies Japan, which is being wrested from its control by its former prince, Lelouch vi Britannia.
Cowboy Bebop	"Asteroid Blues" (Cowboy Bebop)	1998	Takes place in the year 2071, where humanity has colonized much of the solar system after a hyperspace accident left Earth uninhabitable, though some people still live on Earth, most notably Ed. The law is mostly upheld by a bounty hunting system called Cowboys, chief among them being the crew of the Bebop. Series creator Shinichirō Watanabe later confirmed that all of his works, including Cowboy Bebop, Samurai Champloo, Space Dandy, Carol & Tuesday, and Lazarus, take place in the same universe.
The Dark Knight Returns	Batman: Year One	2011	Continuity based on Frank Miller's The Dark Knight Returns and Batman: Year One. The central focus is on Batman in both films with fleeting references to the larger DC mythos, with Superman and Green Arrow having supporting roles in The Dark Knight Returns.
DC Animated Universe	Batman: The Animated Series	1992	A series of popular animated television series and related spin-offs produced by Warner Bros. Animation. It is sometimes referred to as the Diniverse or Timmverse after its two most notable contributors, Paul Dini and Bruce Timm.
DC Animated Movie Universe	Justice League: The Flashpoint Paradox	2013	A series of animated films loosely based on The New 52 continuity. The setting was succeeded by the Tomorrowverse after Justice League Dark: Apokolips War, with the two continuities later being revealed to be connected.
Despicable Me Universe	Despicable Me	2010	Comprises the Despicable Me films and the Minions prequels. Also known as the Minionverse. It is a universe where villains terrorize the public and are kept at bay by the Anti-Villain League (AVL). One such villain is Gru, whose plot to steal the moon is foiled by a rival villain Vector and a mixup regarding the adoption of three girls, Margo, Edith, and Agnes, leads to him taking them and his subsequent redemption.
Digimon	Digital Monster	1997	Multi-media fictional universe spanning an anime series, video game series, anime films, and manga comics. The real world exists parallel to the Digital World, a realm closely related with computers and the internet inhabited by creatures called Digimon.
Drawn Together	"Hot Tub" (Drawn Together)	2004	A universe occupied by archetypes based on characters in preexisting shows like Superman: The Animated Series, SpongeBob SquarePants, shows animated by Hanna-Barbera, and Pokémon, among others.
Duck Universe	Walt Disney's Comics and Stories No. 49	1937 (animation); 1944 (comics)	A universe where Disney characters Donald Duck and Scrooge McDuck live. Originally a spin-off of the older Mickey Mouse universe, primarily created by Carl Barks, it has become more expansive over time. While DuckTales is the most well-known series set in this universe, it also shares a universe with other Disney shows, including Darkwing Duck, Goof Troop, and Chip 'n Dale: Rescue Rangers.
Eldran Universe	Zettai Muteki Raijin-Oh	1991	
Equestria	My Little Pony: Friendship Is Magic	2010	A world inhabited by both sentient and non-sentient animals and creatures, mainly four types of ponies: Earth ponies, Pegasus ponies, Unicorn ponies and Alicorn ponies, who are winged unicorns and are of royal status. All ponies have, or will obtain, a cutie mark, which is a symbol that appears on their flank when they discover what their special talent is. The Equestria Girls film series takes place in an alternate version of Equestria that is populated by human counterparts of the My Little Pony characters and is initially devoid of magic.
Gargoyles	"Awakening, Part 1" (Gargoyles)	1994	Follows a group of gargoyles who served a Scottish castle in the 10th century, only to be petrified by those they protected. Awakening in the year 1994, the Gargoyles' leader, Goliath, leads them in fighting against corrupt entrepreneur David Xanatos and other threats to New York City.
Garfield Cinematic Universe	The Garfield Movie	2024	Animated film based on the comic strip of the same name. It stars the titular character, a lazy house cat that lives indifferently with his owner, Jon Arbuckle, and is at odds with his pet dog Odie.
Gen:Lock universe	"The Pilot"	2019	Set in a future dystopian Earth that has been ravished by an alien organization known as the Union, opposed by the pilots of Holons, mecha that mentally sync with their pilots.
Gravity Falls Multiverse	Gravity Falls	2012	A fictional multiverse in which Gravity Falls, Big City Greens, Amphibia, The Owl House, and Inside Job take place.
Gundam Multiverse	Mobile Suit Gundam	1979	Most timelines in the Gundam multiverse center around intergalactic wars that are waged with mechas called Gundam. It began in the Universal Century timeline, where the RX-78-2 Gundam, piloted by Amuro Ray, was utilized in the Earth Federation's war against the Principality of Zeon.
Gurren Lagann Universe	"Bust Through the Heavens with Your Drill!" (Gurren Lagann)	2007	Set a thousand years after the Anti-Spiral War, a war that involved humans and alien beings that were intent on destroying all life that possessed Spiral Power, an energy source that represents the energy of evolution. The protagonists, known as Team Dai-Gurren, seek to reclaim Earth and destroy the Anti-Spirals.
Hellaverse	That's Entertainment (Hazbin Hotel)	October 28, 2019	The setting for multiple series created by Vivienne Medrano, including Hazbin Hotel, Helluva Boss, and ZooPhobia; with the exception of ZooPhobia, this universe takes place in Hell. Due to overpopulation, angels come down to Hell to initiate an annual purge. Charlie Morningstar, wishing for a more peaceful alternative, opens the titular hotel to help redeem the residents of Hell.
Hotel Transylvania universe	Hotel Transylvania	2012	A comedic universe involving classic horror monsters, including vampires, mummies, zombies, Frankensteins, and slimes, who reside in the titular hotel founded by Dracula. After its safety is compromised by a lone human tourist, Johnny, Dracula's daughter, Mavis, takes a liking to him, resulting in shenanigans across multiple films.
J9 Universe	Galaxy Cyclone Braiger	1981	The setting of Galaxy Cyclone Braiger, Galactic Gale Baxingar, and Galactic Whirlwind Sasuraiger. which are set in the same universe but separated by multiple centuries. Its main characters pilot mechas called J9, which can transform into different vehicles, such as a car, a motorcycle, or a train.
Jimmy Neutron	Jimmy Neutron: Boy Genius	2001	The titular protagonist, an 11-year-old boy genius with an IQ of 210, engages in misadventures with his classmates in the city of Retroville. The spinoff series Planet Sheen follows side character Sheen, who is accidentally transported to the planet Zeenu and seeks a way home.
Jonny Quest	Jonny Quest	1964	A fictional world in which Jonny Quest, The New Adventures of Jonny Quest, The Real Adventures of Jonny Quest and its movies Jonny's Golden Quest, Johnny Quest vs. The Cyber Insects, and the crossover film Tom and Jerry: Spy Quest all take place. It was later expanded to include the adult comedy cartoons Harvey Birdman, Attorney at Law, The Venture Bros. and its movie The Venture Bros.: Radiant Is the Blood of the Baboon Heart and was eventually revealed to be part of a much bigger multiversal Hanna-Barbera world with the Jellystone! series.
Klasky Csupo Universe	Rugrats	1991	A fictional world consisting of Rugrats (1991), Aaahh!!! Real Monsters, The Wild Thornberrys, Rocket Power, As Told by Ginger, All Grown Up!, Rugrats Pre-School Daze, and Rugrats (2021). These series have crossed over with each other at several points through feature films, guest appearances, and tie-in comics.
League of Legends Multiverse		2009	Set in the vast science-fantasy world of Runeterra, where the game and related media take place.
The Lego Movieverse	The Lego Movie	2014	Animated Lego films produced by Warner Bros. that includes films such as The Lego Movie and its sequel, The Lego Batman Movie, The Lego Ninjago Movie and the TV series Unikitty!. The universe is partly the imagination of Finn, a young boy who deals with family issues like a hard-working father and a younger sister, Bianca, who wishes to be acknowledged by him.
Lilo & Stitch universe	Lilo & Stitch	June 16, 2002	A fictional multiverse in which Lilo & Stitch, Stitch!: The Movie, Lilo & Stitch: The Series, Lilo & Stitch 2: Stitch Has a Glitch, The Origin of Stitch, Leroy & Stitch, and related media take place, with spin-offs Stitch!, Stitch & Ai, Lilo & Stitch, and Stitch & the Samurai taking place in alternate dimensions and, or timelines. In addition, Lilo & Stitch: The Series had crossover episodes with American Dragon: Jake Long, The Proud Family, Kim Possible, and Recess, implying that these shows may take place in the same universe.
MacFarlane Universe	Family Guy	1999	The setting for multiple series created by Seth MacFarlane, including Family Guy, American Dad!, and The Cleveland Show. It has also crossed over with Springfield from The Simpsons in "The Simpsons Guy", implying a connection to Futurama, The Critic, and Disenchantment, as well as King of the Hill, with its characters making a cameo appearance in "Bart Star".
Macross	The Super Dimension Fortress Macross	1982	Original TV series later adapted into Robotech in North America. The backstory of the Macross universe involves ancient aliens called the Protoculture creating humans and the Zentradi. In the future, the human race repurposed an alien wreckage into the Super Dimension Fortress Macross, a giant transforming battleship that serves as the frontline in the war against the Zentradi.
Megazone 23 universe	Megazone 23	1985	Original OVA later adapted into Robotech: The Movie in North America. The series is set 500 years into the future on the colony ship Megazone 23, one of several colony ships in space.
Marvel Action Hour	Iron Man	1994	Main setting of the Fantastic Four, Iron Man, and The Incredible Hulk animated series. This universe is also known as Earth-534834 in the Marvel multiverse.
Fox Marvel Animated Universe	X-Men	1992	TV series connected by crossovers that are considered counterparts of DC Animated Universe. Consists of X-Men: The Animated Series, Spider-Man, and X-Men '97. This universe is also known as Earth-92131 in the Marvel multiverse.
Marvel Animated Universe	Ultimate Spider-Man	2012	Marvel animated series and films that are set in the same continuity and produced by Marvel Entertainment or Disney, consisting of Ultimate Spider-Man, Avengers Assemble, and Hulk and the Agents of S.M.A.S.H. This universe is also known as Earth-12041 in the Marvel multiverse.
Marvel Anime	Iron Man	2010	The setting for four anime television series and two direct-to-video films produced in collaboration between Marvel Entertainment and Japanese animation studio Madhouse. This universe is also known as Earth-101001 in the Marvel multiverse.
Marvel Disk Wars	"The Mightiest of Heroes!" (Marvel Disk Wars: The Avengers)	2014	Also known as Earth-14042 in the Marvel multiverse. It shares the normal conventions of the Marvel universe until Loki traps the Avengers in experimental devices called DISKs. Five kids are assigned by the Avengers to carry the DISKs and use them to bring out the Avengers to fight villains.
Mickey Mouse universe	Plane Crazy	1928	A universe coexistent with the Duck universe where characters created by the Walt Disney Company live, most notably Mickey Mouse, with supporting characters including Minnie Mouse, Donald Duck, Daisy Duck, Goofy, Pluto, and Pete.
Mighty Mouse	Mouse of Tomorrow	1942	A universe inhabited by funny animals, where the superhero Mighty Mouse, originally known as Super Mouse, fights supervillains and evil cats.
MOSPEADA universe	Genesis Climber MOSPEADA	1983	Original TV series later adapted into Robotech in North America. The series takes place in the year 2050 and revolves around a conflict between the Second Earth Recapture Force and the Invid alien race, with the former being humans from Mars intent on retaking the Earth from the Invids.
Ninjago	Masters of Spinjitzu Pilot Episodes	2011	Fictional universe spanning the Lego Ninjago franchise, which includes the Ninjago television series, Ninjago: Dragons Rising, Legends of Chima, books and comics. The series follows a group of young warriors who fight evil using the power of Spinjitzu, a martial art taught to them by Sensei Wu.
Phineas and Ferb	"Rollercoaster" (Phineas and Ferb)	2007	A universe where Phineas and Ferb, Milo Murphy's Law, and Hamster & Gretel take place. Nicknamed the "Dwampyverse" by fans after both shows' creators Dan Povenmire and Jeff "Swampy" Marsh, who respectively voice the characters Dr. Heinz Doofenshmirtz and Major Monogram in both shows.
Pokémon Universe	Pokémon	1996	Multi-media fictional universe spanning an anime series, video game series, anime films, manga comics, and a live-action film. Loosely based on the real world, where Pokémon roam the lands freely. People known as Pokémon Trainers use Poké Balls to capture them in the wild and use them as either pets, assistance at home or at work, or to fight in competitive battles.
RWBY universe	RWBY	2013	Set in the fictional world of Remnant, where young people train to become warriors called Huntsmen and Huntresses to protect their world from monsters called Grimm.
Quintel Universe	Regular Show	2010	A universe where Regular Show and Close Enough take place. Both series have a structure where things start out normally with mundane stakes, which are soon raised when out-of-this-world concepts and assets come into play.
Rick and Morty universe	Pilot	2013	An extensive multiverse which alcoholic, nihilistic scientist Rick Sanchez and his aloof, naïve grandson Morty Smith explore. There also exists countless alternate versions of Rick and Morty, who hold dominion over parts of spacetime.
Robotech universe	Robotech	1985	Fictional universe adapted from three unrelated anime shows: The Super Dimension Fortress Macross, Super Dimension Century Orguss, and Fang of the Sun Dougram. Robotech: The Movie was adapted from Megazone 23 and Super Dimension Cavalry Southern Cross. The series revolves around the Robotech Wars, a series of three wars spread across generations which utilize names from the anime each war is based on.
Scooby-Dooniverse	Scooby-Doo, Where Are You!	1969	A fictional multiverse in which the Scooby-Doo franchise takes place. The series follows the adventures of Mystery Inc., a group of four teenagers and their talking dog who travel around America and the world solving mysteries. It has also crossed over with several other major franchises over the years, including Supernatural in the episode "Scoobynatural".
Shrek universe	Shrek	2001	
South Park	"Cartman Gets an Anal Probe" (South Park)	1997	Takes place in the fictional town of South Park, Colorado, where various hijinks take place, mainly revolving around Stan Marsh, Kyle Broflovski, Eric Cartman, and Kenny McCormick.
Springfield	The Simpsons	1989	The fictional universe in which Matt Groening's animated series The Simpsons, Futurama, and Disenchantment take place. Crossed over with the MacFarlane universe in "The Simpsons Guy".
Star Wars Canon Universe	Star Wars	1977	Originating with the live-action films, George Lucas produced the Star Wars: The Clone Wars animated film and animated series and served as supervising director, with Dave Filoni producing Star Wars Rebels. The animation takes place in the same universe as the live-action films. The Clone Wars begins when the Jedi and the Old Republic are forced to deal with a separatist movement led by the Confederacy of Independent Systems, resulting in a galaxy-wide war that spans three years. At the end of the war, the Galactic Empire is formed and engages in hunting down the Jedi, and from the ashes of the Old Republic arises a group of rebels that wish to restore peace to the galaxy.
Hanna-Barbera cinematic universe	Scoob!	2020	Scoob! was intended to launch a cinematic universe based on Hanna-Barbera properties. While the universe was short-lived, it featured Scooby-Doo, Blue Falcon and Dynomutt, Wacky Races, and Captain Caveman, with references to other shows throughout the film.
SpongeVerse	SpongeBob SquarePants	1999	A universe where SpongeBob SquarePants and the spin-off series Kamp Koral and The Patrick Star Show both take place. The universe is set in Bikini Bottom, a city populated by funny animal characters based around sealife, such as the titular SpongeBob SquarePants.
Steven Universe	"The Time Thing" (Steven Universe)	2013	The universe of Steven Universe is largely similar to the real world, but has several differences in Earth's history, which are partially the result of interference from the alien Gems. Steven Universe is established to share a universe with fellow Cartoon Network series Uncle Grandpa in the non-canon crossover "Say Uncle".
Super Friends Universe	"The Power Pirate" (Super Friends)	1973	An adaptation of the Justice League comics, with its main roster consisting of Superman, Batman, Robin, Wonder Woman, and Aquaman. Several additional members are introduced in later seasons, including the Wonder Twins, Black Vulcan, Cyborg, and Firestorm.
The Superman/Aquaman Hour of Adventure and The Batman/Superman Hour	The New Adventures of Superman	1966	A series of shows made by Filmation featuring characters from DC Comics, including Superman, Batman, Aquaman, Green Lantern, Atom, The Flash, Hawkman, the Justice League, and the Teen Titans.
ThunderCats Universe	ThunderCats	1985	The series takes place on the planet Third Earth, where the last remnants of Thundera's population retreat to following its destruction. Known as the ThunderCats, their leader, Prince Lion-O, who wields the Sword of Omens, leads them against enemies like the Mutants of Plun-Darr and the sorcerer Mumm-Ra.
Tiger & Bunny	"All's Well That Ends Well" (Tiger & Bunny)	2011	Set in the fictional Stern Bild City, defended by superheroes sponsored by major corporations like SoftBank, Bandai, Pepsi. Two such superheroes are Kotetsu T. Kaburagi and Barnaby Brooks Jr., who are paired together by their benefactors despite their lack of synergy.
Totally Spies! Universe	"A Thing for Musicians" (Totally Spies!)	November 3, 2001	The setting of Totally Spies!, Martin Mystery, Totally Spies! The Movie, and The Amazing Spiez!. The series takes heavy inspiration from anime in terms of style and characterization.
Trolls universe	Trolls	2016	
Unicron Trilogy	Transformers: Armada	2002	The setting of Transformers: Armada, Transformers: Energon, and Transformers: Cybertron. True to its name, a major component of this universe is Unicron, reincarnated after his death in the original Generation 1 continuity to wreak havoc on this new universe.
Voltron Multiverse	Voltron	1984	Fictional universe adapted from anime series Beast King GoLion and Armored Fleet Dairugger XV. The series involves five teenagers chosen by Princess Allura to fight the forces against King Zarkon using five robot lions that transform into the mecha Voltron.
Yostverse	Hulk Vs.	2009	The setting of Hulk Vs., Wolverine and the X-Men, Thor: Tales of Asgard, and The Avengers: Earth's Mightiest Heroes. This shared universe is also known as Earth-8096 in the Marvel multiverse.
Toaru Universe / A Certain Universe	A Certain Magical Index	2008	The setting of A Certain Magical Index, A Certain Scientific Railgun, and A Certain Scientific Accelerator. In this world, magic and ESP are a reality and utilized by the people of Academy City. Sorcerers such as Toma Kamijo obtain their powers by learning the ways of magic, while espers like Mikoto Misaka obtain their powers through science.
Douluo Divine Universe	Soul Land/Douluo Continent	2008 (Novel), 2018 (Anime), 2021 (Drama)	Created in chaos by God, who divided the universe into ten parts. Tang San, the main protagonist, was born on the planet Douluo, later becoming the successor of the Sea God and Azura God.

== Comics ==
This is a partial list of fictional universes created for comics.

Universe	Origin/ first mentioned	Date	Notes
AC Comics	Paragon Presents #1	1970	Home to the Femforce comics. The universe heavily utilizes public domain superheroes and retools them, such as Miss Victory, who leads the titular all-female superteam Femforce. The universe makes heavy use of good girl art.
Alien Legion	Alien Legion No. 1	1984	Also known as Earth-98140 in the Marvel multiverse. It is set in the distant future, where the intergalactic governing body known as the TOPHAN Galactic Union (TGU) employs soldiers in the mercenary group Alien Legion to fight outside forces across the universe.
Amalgam Universe	Amalgam Comics No. 1	1996	Also known as Earth-9602 in the Marvel multiverse. Characters from both Marvel and DC are combined into amalgamated characters, such as Dark Claw (Batman and Wolverine), Super-Soldier (Superman and Captain America), and Judgment League X (Justice League and X-Men).
America's Best Comics Universe	Tom Strong No.1	1999	A retrofuturist superhero universe created by Alan Moore. Prominent titles include Tom Strong, Promethea, Top 10, Tomorrow Stories, and Terra Obscura. Each title features a unique take on different types of superheroes, ranging from two-fisted pulpy adventure heroes, mystical goddesses, superheroes as police officers, and more.
Archie Multiverse	Pep Comics No. 22	1941	Alternate universes that connect to Archie Andrews and his town, Riverdale.
Asterix	Pilote #0	October 1959	Takes place in the year 50 BC, where two Gauls, Asterix and Obelix, fight against invading Romans using magic potions that give them superhuman strength.
Astro City	Kurt Busiek's Astro City No. 1	1995	A superhero universe set in the western Astro City, which features various fantastical people mixed in with everyday semantics. The city was named after one of its heroes, who defended it from an alien invasion in 1947.
Badger's universe	Badger #1	1983	Set in Madison, Wisconsin. The protagonist is Noerbert Sykes, a Vietnam veteran suffering from DID. One of his personalities is the martial arts master costumed hero The Badger, who deals with strange phenomena like wizards, demons, and vampire-hunting pigs. Shares a universe with Nexus.
BattleTech Universe	Battledroids board game	1984	Futuristic wargame setting with a largely fictionalized 2D starmap extending over 2,500 light-years out from Terra; the timeline diverges from real-world history around 1984 and is detailed through the mid-32nd century. Was originally created for Battledroids in 1984, which was renamed to BattleTech in its 2nd edition. Later additions include the BattleTech: The Spider and the Wolf graphic novel (1986) and BattleTech: The Animated Series (1994).
Big Bang Comics Universe	Berzerker No. 1	February 1993	A universe that takes notes from the Golden and Silver Ages of Comics. A majority of its characters are pastiches of heroes from Marvel and DC, also featuring original characters such as Dr. Weird, Megaton, and Ramm. True to its Golden/Silver Age roots, there are two different Earths, home to different versions and teams of the central cast.
Black Hammer	Black Hammer #1	2016	Set in two main locations: Black Hammer Ranch and Spiral City. Spiral City used to be the hub of superhero activity until 1985, when a world-ending threat invaded and killed the titular superhero, Black Hammer. While the threat was eliminated, the main superheroes are teleported to a strange Americana-style town accompanied by a farm that they live in, known as Black Hammer Ranch.
The Boys Universe	The Boys No. 1	2006	A cruel and sadistic world where almost every superhero is an unhinged psychopath and employed by the global conglomerate Vought-American. The only people keeping them in line via blackmail is a crack special ops team called The Boys, led by former Royal Marine Billy Butcher. In the penultimate arc of the comic, almost every superhero takes part in an unsuccessful coup d'état against the American government.
Catalyst Prime Universe	Catalyst Prime No. 1	March 2013	After a team of astronauts stopped a meteor from crashing on Earth, the ensuing showers caused people all over America to gain superpowers.
Chaos! Universe	Evil Ernie No. 1	December 1991	A universe based around horror and bad girl art. Home to characters such as Evil Ernie, Lady Death, Purgatori, and Chastity.
Charlton Universe	Yellowjacket No. 1	1944	Also known as Earth-4 in the DC multiverse. A standard superhero universe featuring characters such as Peacemaker, Blue Beetle, Captain Atom, Judomaster, Nightshade, Peter Cannon, and The Question upon others. This universe was merged with several other universes to form a new Earth after the events of Crisis on Infinite Earths.
Comic Republic Universe	Might of Guardian Prime #1	2013	A universe based around superheroes in Africa, most notably Guardian Prime and the Vanguards.
Crossover Earth	Superman vs. The Amazing Spider-man	1976	Also known as Earth-7642 in the Marvel multiverse. In this universe, Marvel Comics characters coexist with characters from DC Comics, Image Comics (particularly Extreme Studios, WildStorm, and Top Cow), Archie, Shi, Painkiller Jane, IDW's Transformers, and Attack on Titan.
Cyclone Comics Universe	Cyclone! #1	1985	A superhero universe based in Australia. Home to Southern Squadron, Southern Cross, Jackaroo, Flash Damingo, and Dark Nebula.
Dakotaverse	Hardware No. 1	1993	Taking place in the fictional Dakota City, America's most prominent heroes are people of color, including Hardware, Icon, Rocket, and Static.
Danger Girl Universe	Danger Girl #1	1998	A comic that pays homage to classic action stories such as Charlie's Angels, James Bond, and Indiana Jones. It follows Abbey Chase, Sydney Savage and Sydney's sister Sonya as they embark on globe-trotting adventures while fighting Major Maxim and his Hammer Empire.
Dark Horse Universe	Comics' Greatest World #1	1993	The universe where the titles of Catalyst, X, Ghost, and, Agents of Law take place. The comics set in this universe are set around four regions in America; the dark, crime-infested Arcadia, the shining Metropolis Golden City, the rundown Steel Harbor, and the Vortex, a rift open in Nevada.
DC Multiverse	The Flash #123	1961	Universes in which the many separate continuities of DC Comics, including Superman, Batman, and Wonder Woman, take place.
Defiant Universe	Warriors of Plasm No. 1	August 1993	A universe based around a concept known as Dreamtime and how it was distorted by an event called the Great Schism, which caused the creation of the planet known by its inhabitants as the Org of Plasm and the emergence of nightmarish creatures in Manhattan.
DNAgents universe	DNAgents No. 1	1983	Named after the titular superhero team, who fights on behalf of the Matrix Corporation using the genetic engineering they instilled upon its members.
Dreadstar's Universe	Epic Illustrated No. 1	March 1980	Also known as Earth-8116 in the Marvel multiverse. The Earth was destroyed by the tyrannical Zygoteans, then later the Milky Way Galaxy by the deity-like Aknaton. The last survivor of the Milky Way is Vanth Dreadstar of Byfrexia, who travels the universe with an ensemble cast of adventurers.
Dynamite Entertainment Universe	Army of Darkness: Ashes 2 Ashes No. 1	2004	Also known as Earth-818793 in the Marvel multiverse. A universe in which most of the comics published by Dynamite Entertainment are set in, including Army of Darkness, Red Sonja, Vampirella, Project Superpowers, Green Hornet, and Xena: Warrior Princess.
E-Man's Universe	E-Man No. 1	1973	A standard world with the exception of E-Man, a sentient packet of energy that was thrown off by a nova and traveled to Earth to learn about the facets of life. This packet of energy formed the shape of a superhero named E-Man with the civilian identity of Alec Tronn.
The End League Universe	The End League No. 1	January 2008	The comic takes place after the Green Event, where, after a chain reaction of events caused by the nemesis of Astonishman, the Earth became irradiated and thrown off its axis. Three billion people died, with one in every ten thousand survivors gaining superpowers. A team of heroes are handpicked by Astonishman to keep the peace in order to make up for the mistakes he made by being part of the Green Event.
Energon Universe	Void Rivals No. 1	2023	A shared universe of comic books based on Transformers and G.I. Joe; published by Skybound Entertainment. The universe was jumpstarted by the original series, Void Rivals.
Eternia	Masters of the Universe	1981	Mystical planet at the center of the universe that forms the setting for the Masters of the Universe franchise. The planet Eternia is in a constant state of conflict between the Heroic and Evil Warriors, led respectively by He-Man and Skeletor.
Fawcett Universe	Whiz Comics No. 2	1940	Created by Fawcett Comics during the Golden Age of comic books and starring superheroes such as Captain Marvel, Bulletman and Bulletgirl, and Spy Smasher. This universe is known as Earth-S in pre-Crisis continuity, and has since been merged with the main DC universe.
Fiascoverse	Megaton Man #1	1984	A comedic superhero universe taking place in the fictional city of Megatropolis, Michigan. Megaton Man is a muscle-bound superhero who got his powers from either being bitten by a radioactive frog or taking part in a super-soldier program. Megaton Man regularly fights alongside other equally bizarre superheroes such as Phantom Jungle Girl, X-Ray Boy, and Yarn Man.
Futurians	Marvel Graphic Novels #9	1984	An advanced society from the future wished to change history by sending genetic information back into the 20th century in hopes of creating superhumans to stop an unknown disaster. One of the people of the future downloaded their mind into a hobo, allowing him to become intellectually gifted and founding a megacorporation, collecting the empowered humans to fight for his behalf.
Grimjack's Universe	Starslayer No. 10	November 1983	Originally set in a post-apocalyptic Chicago, the Grimjack universe is based in the pan-dimensional city of Cynosure, home to riffraff from across space and time. John Gaunt, also known as Grimjack, does bounty hunting in Cynosure, operating out of a bar in a slum area of the city called The Pit.
Hasbro Comic Book Universe	The Transformers: Infiltration No. 0	2005	Setting of many of the comic books based on Hasbro and published by IDW publishing. While originally based around Transformers and G.I. Joe, the line would later be expanded in 2016 to feature other Hasbro characters, such as the Micronauts, Rom the Space Knight, M.A.S.K., Action Man, and Visionaries.
Hellboy Universe	Dime Press No. 4	1993	Universe where the Hellboy comics and its spinoffs take place, where cryptids, monsters, demons, and aliens are monitored and kept in check by the Bureau for Paranormal Research and Defense. Their Extranormal division is a team of special agents led by Hellboy, a demon who rejected his destiny of causing armageddon.
Image Universe	WildC.A.T.s No. 1, Savage Dragon No. 1, Spawn No. 1, Cyber Force No. 1, & Youngblood No. 1	1992	Setting of many of the comic books published by Image Comics take place. However this gets less true as the years goes by with Shattered Image removing the shared universe concept and when Image United was canceled. Additionally, Invincible also had crossovers with other Image Comics superheroes until it ended. Since most of them are creator-owned, they simply focus on their own universes since.
Irredeemable Universe	Irredeemable No. 1	2009	The world's greatest superhero known as the Plutonian initially seems like the ideal person, but deep down had a brevity of insecurities and shortcomings. It all came to breaking point when Plutonian destroyed an entire city, soon becoming the world's greatest enemy. His former allies of the superteam Paradigm has to work desperately to stop him.
Judge Dredd's Universe	2000 AD no. 2	March 1977	A dystopian future where the Earth has been badly damaged by a series of international conflicts, much of the planet has turned into a radioactive wasteland, and populations have aggregated in enormous mega-cities. Also shares a timeline with other 2000 AD stories, namely Strontium Dog.
Justice Machine Universe	Justice Machine No. 1	June 1981	The titular superteam came from the planet Georwell, a fascist dystopia that is Earth 900 years in the future. When traveling to the present day to apprehend a wanted criminal, the Justice Machine came to realize who they were working for and rebelled, instead becoming a force for good on Earth.
Kayko and Kokosh	Niezwykłe Przygody Kajtka Majtka	1958	Universe in which Polish comic series Kajtek i Koko, Kayko and Kokosh, the sequel/ spin off series Kajko i Kokosz: Nowe Przygody, Kajko i Kokosz' s seven computer games, and Zamach na Milusia's film adaptation take place.
Kirbyverse	Secret City Saga #0	April 1993	A universe created from unused concepts by Jack Kirby as well as some of his creator-owned works. Home to Silver Star, Captain Victory, Glory Knights, TeenAgents, and Satan's Six.
The League of Extraordinary Gentlemen	The League of Extraordinary Gentlemen #1	March 1999	A universe where virtually all of fiction is canon. The main hook of this universe are teams made up of significant people called the League of Extraordinary Gentlemen. One such team is in Victorian-era Britain, where Mina Murray founded a team consisting of Allan Quatermain, Tom Sawyer, Henry Jekyll and Edward Hyde, The Invisible Man, and Captain Nemo.
Madman's universe	Creatures of the Id #1	October 1990	A world set in the fictional Snap City, where the reanimated corpse of Zane Townsend is instructed by a scientist to fight various oddities under the guise of Madman. He later becomes a member of similarly odd heroes known as the Atomics. Madman is also a part of the Image Universe.
Marshal Law universe	Marshal Law No. 1	1987	A dystopian future taking place in a metropolis built upon the remains of San Francisco. The main character, Marshal Law, is an agent of the government hellbent on killing superheroes, mainly out of his disdain for them and his past guilt of being one.
Marvel Multiverse	Captain Britain No. 1	October 1976	Universes in which the various separate continuities of Marvel Comics, including the Avengers, Fantastic Four, Spider-Man, and X-Men take place. The main Marvel universe is known as Earth-616.
The Mask Universe	Dark Horse Presents #10	1987	A mask of mysterious origin comes into the possession of Stanley Ipkiss, a down-on-his-luck and pathetic man who uses it to become Big Head, a chaotic being whose power would soon be misused from Stanley's deep-seated insecurities.
Massive-Verse	Radiant Black No. 1	2021	A universe spearheaded by Kyle Higgins. Home to Radiant Black, Rogue Sun, the Dead Lucky, No/One, Inferno Girl Red, and more.
Millarworld	Wanted No. 1	December 2003	Also known as Earth-1219 in the Marvel multiverse. A universe where most comics are set in, such as Chrononauts, Kick-Ass, Nemesis, Superior, Kingsman, Hit-Girl, and Empress. Supercrooks and Jupiter's Legacy are in-universe movies taking place in their own reality.
Miracleman's Universe	Marvelman No. 25	1954	This universe is home to Marvelman AKA Miracleman and his Miracleman Family. The name existed as a comic book that was utilized by German scientist Emil Gargunza to experiment on young kids with alien technology in the 1950s. Thirty years later, the leader of the Miracleman Family Micky Moran rediscovered his powers as Miracleman, leading to a series of events that ended with Micky turning the Earth into a utopia.
Mongo	Flash Gordon	1934	Totalitarian planet that is the setting for the Flash Gordon comic strip. The planet Mongo is occupied by multiple kingdoms answering to Ming the Merciless, who is opposed by Flash Gordon, reporter Dale Arden, and scientist Hans Zarkov.
NacelleVerse	NacelleVerse #0	2024	A universe based on various 80s brands, including animated series and toy lines, created by Brian Volk-Weiss and presented by The Nacelle Company.
Next Men Universe	John Byrne's Next Men Nol. 1	1992	Main setting of John Byrne's Next Men, published by Dark Horse Comics and IDW Publishing. The Next Men are a team of five outcasts experimented on from infancy by scientists in Antarctica. With their unique powers, the Next Men are constantly on the run from the government. The series originally shared a universe with other creator-owned series published by Dark Horse, such as Hellboy and Concrete.
New Universe	Star Brand No. 1	1986	Also known as Earth-148611 as part of the Marvel multiverse. A large light encompassed the Earth in what is known as the White Event, causing some people to gain superpowers. Home to characters such as Starbrand, Nightmask, Justice, DP 7, and Psi-Force.
Nexus' Universe	Nexus No. 1	1981	Set in the 25th century, a lone man named Horatio Hellpop operates out of the moon Ylum as the cosmic superhero named Nexus, fighting the forces of evil across the universe.
Ninja High School universe	Ninja High School #1	1986	An animesque universe that used characters published under Antarctic Press. The three staple titles are Ninja High School, Gold Digger, and Warrior Nun Areala, with a handful of smaller ones like Tomorrow Girl, Zetraman, and Kamen America.
Nocturnals' universe	Nocturnals No. 1	1995	Set in the fictional Californian town of Pacific City, the Nocturnals are a found family of supernatural oddities led by Doc Horror who fight crime across Pacific City.
Protectors Universe	Miss Fury Special Limited Edition #1	August 1991	Also known as Earth-1136 as part of the Marvel multiverse. Originally home to revivals of characters from the defunct Centaur Comics such as The Arrow, The Clock, and Miss Fury. It was later merged with the Dinosaurs for Hire and Ex-Mutants comics to form the Genesis Universe.
Raj Comics Universe	GENL #14	January 1986	A superhero universe based in India featuring characters from Raj Comics' extensive lineup of characters, such as Nagraj, Super Commando Dhruva, and Shakti.
Razorline	Razorline: The First Cut No. 1	July 1993	Also known as Earth-45828 as part of the Marvel multiverse. A universe of superheroes of supernatural origin created by horror writer Clive Barker. Home to Ectokid, Hokum & Hex, Hyperkind, and Saint Sinner. Further titles that were cancelled would have included Marvel Universe regulars like the Punisher and S.H.I.E.L.D.
Red Circle Comics Universe	Blue Ribbon Comics No. 1	November 1939	The first shared superhero universe in comics. Includes legacy heroes dating back to the 1940s, with characters like The Shield, The Black Hood, The Comet, and more additions and revisions being added over the years, several going on to become members of the premier superhero team known as the Mighty Crusaders. This universe has gone through many stages starting in the 1960s with the Dark Circle Comics series, with a planned reimagining in 2021 that was canceled.
R.I.P.D. Universe	R.I.P.D. No. 1	October 1999	A oneshot comic later adapted to a film in 2012. The main characters of R.I.P.D. are spirits assigned to work for the Rest in Peace Department, dealing with the crimes of the spiritual world.
Rising Stars	Rising Stars #0	1999	A comet passes over America, giving 113 in utero children superpowers, who are known as Specials, with is a Special's powers is transferred to another one when they die. Some, like Jason Miller, Joshua Kane, and Randy Fisk, would become superheroes, but others would go down the path of destruction. A series of unfortunate events would lead to one last Special, a man named the Poet, who would tell the whole story of Rising Stars.
Scott Pilgrim	Scott Pilgrim's Precious Little Life	2004	Based in Toronto, Canada, this comic focuses on Scott Pilgrim and his friend group as he deals with personal issues, relationships, and trying to win over Ramona Flowers by fighting her seven exes.
Shadowline Saga	Doctor Zero No. 1	February 1988	Also known as Earth-88194 as part of the Marvel multiverse. Created by Archie Goodwin, this universe is based around the concept of Shadow Dwellers, a race of beings who seek to influence the world by introducing superpowered entities such as Doctor Zero, the Order of St. George, and the Powerline.
Sigilverse	CrossGenesis No. 1	2000	With the exception of two series, the Sigilverse takes place in the 900th century. A set number of people bear a mark on their bodies called Sigils, which give them unique powers.
Sin City Universe	Sin City No. 1	1991	A gritty noir story set in the titular Sin City and created by comic book legend Frank Miller. In each title of Sin City, it focuses on various characters, such as John Hartigan, Marv, and Dwight McCarthy.
Stan Lee's Mighty 7 Universe	Stan Lee's Mighty 7 No. 1	2012	Follows the adventures of a group of aliens that fight evil on Earth, with their adventures being chronicled by Stan Lee.
T.H.U.N.D.E.R. Agents Universe	T.H.U.N.D.E.R. Agents No. 1	1965	Superheroes on Earth are agents of the United Nations, with their powers being obtained through technology. The team known as The Higher United Nations Defense Enforcement Reserves fights against villains like the Warlord, the Iron Maiden, and the forces of S.P.I.D.E.R.
TidalWave Universe	10th Muse #1	2000	A universe whose foundation is a woman named Emma Sonnet, a superhero known as the 10th Muse who is the daughter of Zeus and the hidden tenth muse. There are many series that inhabit the same universe as Tenth Muse through crossovers like Legend of Isis, Stormy Daniels: Space Force, and Roger Corman's Black Scorpion.
Tintin	Tintin in the Land of the Soviets	1929	The fictionalised world of Hergé's Adventures of Tintin follows the titular Tintin and his dog Snowy as he embarks on adventures across the world. He is sometimes joined by other characters, such as the bumbling detective duo Thomson and Thompson and the regularly inebriated Captain Haddock.
Teenage Mutant Ninja Turtles Multiverse	Turtles Forever	1984	A fictional multiverse where the various Teenage Mutant Ninja Turtles continuities take place, ranging from the original comic series, the 1987 animated series, Archie's Teenage Mutant Ninja Turtles Adventures, the TMNT films, the 2003 animated series, the 2012 animated series, the IDW comics, and Rise of the Teenage Mutant Ninja Turtles.
Tomasz Samojlik's Universe	The last bison	2004	The universe where Polish scriptwriter and drawer Tomasz Samojlik's comics and children books, including The last bison series, Żubr Pompik, Saga o Ryjówce and Umarły Las, and animated adaptations of Żubr Pompik and Ryjówka przeznaczenia take place.
Ultraverse	Hardcase No. 1	1993	Also known as Earth-93060 in the Marvel multiverse. A universe with the powers of its superheroes, also known as Ultras, originating from a flat planet called the Godwheel, with magic civilizations on one side and advanced ones on the other.
Valérian Universe	Valérian and Laureline No. 1	1967	Valerian, an adventurer from the 28th century, and Laureline, a French peasant from the 11th century, travel across time and space in intergalactic adventures.
Valiant Universe	Magnus, Robot Fighter No. 1	1991	A universe where the many comics books of X-O. Manowar, Archer & Armstrong, Harbinger, Bloodshot, Rai, and Ninjak take place. Several series set in the Valiant Universe are set in either the present day or the 41st century. The universe also makes use of realistic interpretations of comic-book-style sci-fi.
The Walking Dead Universe	The Walking Dead No. 1	2003	In 2003, zombies emerge from an unknown virus and turn America into an apocalyptic wasteland. Survivors such as Rick Grimes, his family, and others accompanying them attempt to fight off the Walker threat while dealing with psychopathic survivors such as the Governor and Negan.
Watchmen Universe	Watchmen No. 1	1986	An alternate history where Alan Moore's Watchmen series takes place. In the 1940s, a group of New Yorkers found the world's first superhero team known as the Minutemen, but it did not last. Interest in costumed heroes re-emerged when Jon Osterman transformed into Doctor Manhattan, which caused a huge surge in technological advancements.
Wildstorm Universe	Wildstorm Titles	1992	Also known as Earth-50 in the DC and Marvel multiverses. A fictional shared universe where the comic books published by Wildstorm take place. It represents an alternate history of the real world where ideas such as interstellar travel and superhuman abilities are commonplace.

== Manga and webcomics ==
This is a partial list of fictional universes created for manga and webcomics (manhwa, manhua, etc.).

Universe	Origin/ first mentioned	Date	Notes
Afro Samurai	Afro Samurai manga	1998	Taking place in an anachronistic Japan, the titular Afro travels the land in search of revenge, gaining from powers from the Number 1 Headband. The only one that can challenge and take the headband away from the wielder is the one wearing the Number 2 Headband.
Akira	Akira manga	1982	After World War III took place in 1982 from a nuclear explosion in Tokyo caused by the titular psychic Akira, Tokyo was rebuilt from the ground up and became a cyberpunk-like cesspool run by oppressive police and hardened criminals. A chance encounter with an Esper changes the lives of two bikers, Kaneda Shotaro and Tetsuo Shima.
Astro Boy	Astro Boy manga	1952	Taking place in a futuristic 21st century where robots coexist with humans. Its greatest defender is the Mighty Atom, also known as Astro Boy, who fights for the equality of both sides by bringing down evil robots and robot-hating humans.
Attack on Titan	Attack on Titan manga	2009	Takes place in an alternate Earth where giant monsters called Titans ravaged Earth, causing the people of Paradis Island to build three major walls around their civilization. Their military makes use of three-dimensional maneuvering gear and ultrahard steel to fight against the Titans.
Berserk	Berserk manga	1989	
Black Clover	Black Clover manga	2015	A high fantasy universe that revolves around magic in many forms. One kid, Asta, was born without magic but works his way up to one day become the mythical Wizard King by using a phenomenon called Anti-Magic.
Bleach	Bleach manga	2001	Set in the same universe as Tite Kubo's other manga, Burn the Witch. The supernatural exists and is made up of several divisions policing threats that lurk beyond the normal lives of humans. In Japan, there exists the Soul Society, made up of Soul Reapers that fight Hollows and Quincy. In the United Kingdom, the Soul Society's Western branch is the Wing Bind, which is made up of Witches that fight dragons.
Doraemon	Doraemon manga	1970	A relaxed world prone to more family-friendly situations. In the 22nd century, Sewashi Nobi sends a robot cat named Doraemon to the present day to help his ancestor Nobita succeed in school and help his family into a better life.
Dragon Ball Multiverse	Dragon Ball	1984	A fictional multiverse in which the Dragon Ball, including Dragon Ball Z. Dragon Ball GT and Dragon Ball Super manga/anime series, films, and video games all take place.
Erfworld Universe	Erfworld	2006	Fantasy realm that follows the rules of a tabletop wargame, featured in a webcomic of the same name
Fairy Tail	Fairy Tail manga	2006	A fantasy universe known as Earth-land, where guilds run by magic users complete quests for money. One such guild is the Fairy Tail Guild, run by Natsu Dragneel. He and his guild embark on many quests throughout Earth-land while searching for his adoptive father, the dragon Igneel.
Fullmetal Alchemist	Fullmetal Alchemist manga	2001	Set in the early 20th century, in a fictional universe in which alchemy is a widely practiced science. The story takes place in the fictional country of Amestris, which is similar to early 20th-century Germany. Amestris has State Alchemists that help assist in scientific research and fighting crime, namely main protagonists Edward and Alphonse Elric.
Ghost in the Shell	Ghost in the Shell manga	1991	Set in mid-21st century Japan with cyberpunk elements, such as cybernetics and the internet. In the city of Niihama, also known as New Port City, crime is regulated by Section 9, an elite team of police officers led by Chief Aramaki. The main protagonist, Motoko Kusanagi, is an agent of Section 9 who uses computer hacking and mechanized vehicles called Tachikoma to fight crime.
Gintama	Gintama manga	2003	After aliens invade the Earth in the 19th century, Japan becomes a hodge-podge of the Edo period, modern times, and a futuristic setting. A famous bokken-wielding freelancing samurai named Gintoki Sakata regularly gets into trouble with his associates Shinpachi and Kagura.
Hellsing	Hellsing manga	1997	A universe where supernatural threats are kept in line by the Royal Order of Protestant Knights, originally led by Abraham Van Helsing. His last remaining family member, Integra, leads the charge in fighting vampires using her greatest pawn, the vampire Alucard.
Hunter × Hunter	Hunter × Hunter manga	1998	An anachronistic world with a universal power system called Nen, a type of energy utilized in many different ways. The world's citizens are assisted by the Hunter Association, a group of people trained in the ways of Nen. Gon Freecss, son of accomplished Hunter Ging Freecss, dreams of becoming a Hunter himself.
Inuyasha Universe	InuYasha manga	1996	A universe in which Inuyasha and its sequel series,Yashahime, take place. A Japanese girl, Kagome Higurashi, is transported to the 16th century and assists her ancestor priestess Kikyo in dealing with yokai, particularly the half-demon Inuyasha, who reluctantly helps her in recovering the Shikon Jewel.
JoJo's Bizarre Adventure	JoJo's Bizarre Adventure manga	1987	The supernatural exists, but is largely ungoverned. A main example of supernatural phenomena is the existence of Stands, the living manifestation of one's spirit, most often after a person is struck by specially-crafted arrows.
Jujutsu Kaisen Universe	Jujutsu Kaisen manga	2018	Takes place in modern-day Japan, where magic is real, but hidden from normal society. A regular high school student, Yuji Itadori, fights alongside Sorcerers like Satoru Gojo against evil spirits known as Curses.
Lackadaisy Universe	Lackadaisy	2006	A funny animal comic set in 1920s St. Louis. After the murder of the owner of the Lackadaisy speakeasy, the owner's fortunes would be contested by a variety of people all seeking it for their own gain.
Homestuck Universe	Homestuck	2009	Set in 2009, a beta copy of a mysterious computer game called Sburb, a sandbox-style game that manipulates the real world. The installation of Sburb somehow caused the destruction of Earth, and they must beat the game to create a new universe. The only way to escape the game is by completing the tasks of “the Medium.” Internet trolls inhabit “the Medium.”
Magi universe	Magi: The Labyrinth of Magic	2009	Inspired by A Thousand and One Nights, the manga follows Alibaba Saluja and Aladdin and their adventures in the Old World, conquering dungeons and their djinn.
My Hero Academia	My Hero Academia manga	2014	In the late 1980s, a baby was born with manifested powers, after which roughly 80% of the world's population are born with these powers, known as Quirks. While most of them are rudimentary, some are born with extraordinary Quirks, which lead to them becoming superheroes. Protagonist Izuku Midoriya dreams of becoming a hero himself, which comes true after he inherits the powers of All Might.
Naruto Universe	Naruto manga	2000	A fictional feudal fantasy world based on Japan. In the world of Naruto exists a special energy force called Chakra, which can be used by ninjas for special techniques. Another aspect of chakra is kekkei genkai, a hereditary gene that gives the bearer techniques that cannot be used by normal people.
One Piece Universe	One Piece manga	1997	A world where pirates with exceptional powers exist and use said powers to either lead by example or terrorize others. Their powers usually come from consuming certain types of Devil Fruits, at the cost of losing their ability to swim.
One-Punch Man Universe	One-Punch Man manga	2009	Superheroes are commonplace and employed by the Hero Association. Becoming superpowered is relatively easy to achieve, as is shown with salaryman Saitama, who underwent a normal training regimen that made him bald but able to defeat almost every threat with one punch, turning him into a "hero for fun."
Parasyte	Parasyte manga	1989	In Hiroshima, worm-like aliens called Parasites touch down on Earth and start using humans as hosts, transforming them into mutated monstrosities by taking over their brains. After a Parasite takes over Shinichi Izumi's hand and he gains the ability to shapeshift his hand into different forms, he fights other Parasites.
Sailor Moon	Sailor Moon manga	1991	The Moon Kingdom existed during the Silver Millennium until it was destroyed by the sorceress Queen Beryl, with its ruling family being reincarnated as humans on Earth. Princess Serenity was reborn as Usagi Tsukino, who later became the superheroine known as Sailor Moon, leader of the Sailor Senshi.
Saint Seiya	Saint Seiya manga	1985	
Saturday AM multiverse	Apple Black	2013	A manga multiverse based on the Saturday AM imprints by MyFutprint.
Shōnen Jump multiverse	Super Kochikame and Cross Epoch	2006	A shared crossover of a multiverse and a megaverse that brings together several Weekly Shōnen Jump manga series, including Dragon Ball, Kochikame, One Piece and Toriko.
Speed Racer	Speed Racer manga	1966	Follows Go Mifune, a racecar driver who participates in deadly races all over the world in his specialized car Mach 5, which features various gadgets and utilities.
Strike Witches	Strike Witches manga	2005	Taking place in an alternate World War II, alien forces known as the Neuroi invade the Earth, and young girls called Witches fight them utilizing heavy machine guns and Striker Units, flying machines strapped to their legs.
Van Von Hunter's universe	Van Von Hunter	2002	Taking place in the fantasy land of Dikay, the series follows the titular Van Von Hunter, an easygoing adventurer that regularly deals with the forces of evil alongside his sidekick, an amnesiac, beautiful young woman who he rescued from an evil count.
Walkyverse	Roomies!	1997	A shared setting of webcomics starting in 1997 with Roomies!, a slice-of-life comedy series based in Indiana University. The setting would later become more complex, encompassing a multiverse of other projects.
Ylab's Blue String universe			A manhwa universe where several people deal with real life issues. Created by South Korean company Ylab.
Ylab's Gold String universe			Created by South Korean company Ylab.
Ylab's Red String universe			A manhwa universe based on romance. Created by South Korean company Ylab.
Ylab's Super String universe			A manhwa universe where characters with different abilities fight to prevent a catastrophe on Earth. Created by South Korean company Ylab.
Yu-Gi-Oh!	Yu-Gi-Oh! manga	1996	A shonen manga based around the concept of gaming. The series follows Yugi Mutou, the grandson of Sugoroku Mutou, who owns a game shop and comes into possession of the Millennium Puzzle. Upon completing the Puzzle, a spirit known as Dark Yugi possesses him, later being revealed to be the pharaoh Atem. He engages in challenging games with challengers, one of which is the popular trading card game Duel Monsters.
