= Multiverse (Marvel Comics) =

Multiverse used by Marvel Comics

Publication information
- Publisher: Marvel Comics
- First appearance: The Avengers #85 (February 1971)

In story information
- Type: Universe continuity
- Element of stories featuring: Marvel Universe (features)

Within Marvel Comics, most stories take place within the Marvel Universe, which in turn is part of a larger multiverse. Starting with the Captain Britain story in The Daredevils #7, the main continuity in which most Marvel storylines take place was designated as Earth-616.

Other writers would use and define the Multiverse in titles such as Exiles, Ultimate Fantastic Four, and Spider-Verse. New universes would also spin out of storylines involving time-traveling characters such as Rachel Summers, Cable, and Bishop, as their actions would render the worlds they visit as alternate timelines. Various organizations attempt to safeguard and protect the universe, among them the Captain Britain Corps, the Council of Watchers, the Exiles, the Council of Reeds, and the Time Variance Authority (TVA).

The multiverse also plays a role in the Marvel Cinematic Universe (MCU), with its main universe designated as Earth-199999 in external media and as Earth-616 in internal media. The concept was first introduced in Doctor Strange (2016) before becoming the focal point of the franchise in "the Multiverse Saga" (2021–present). Additionally, the multiverse has also been explored in the X-Men film series, Sony's Spider-Man Universe (SSU), and the Spider-Verse franchise, with the latter featuring multiple versions of Spider-Man across different universes, and the former two being tangentially connected to the MCU.

== Publication history ==
In 1977, Marvel Comics started depicted parallel universes to the main setting of their stories in the What If series, narrated by the Watcher and depicting alternate histories that diverged from the familiar Marvel Universe in key moments. In 1983, Alan Moore's Daredevils series featuring Captain Britain for Marvel UK explicitly introduced the travel between the alternate worlds, establishing that each was protected by its own version of Captain Britain, collectively known as Captain Britain Corps. The series was also the first to refer to the alternate words by the Earth-### numerical designations, establishing the home reality of the Brian Braddock version of Captain Britain as Earth-616. That number carried over into the American Marvel Comics through the Excalibur series also featuring Captain Britain and has been used to refer to the "main" Marvel Universe ever since.

In 1992, Senior Editor Mark Gruenwald, creator of the Official Handbook of the Marvel Universe, wrote "Marvel's official rules of time travel" in Marvel Age #117. These established that each act of time travel always produces an alternate universe, diverging it from the original timeline in which the time travel never took place. This led to alternate futures from storylines such as Days of Future Past and Age of Apocalypse being classified as alternate realities within the Multiverse, persisting even after they were supposedly "undone" by the actions of time-travelers. In Nightcrawler #1 (1985) the X-Men traveled into the reality of a fairy tale which Kitty Pryde had previously seemingly "invented" in Uncanny X-Men #153 (1981). This established the precedent of in-universe fiction representing the factual truth of alternate realities, later explicitly confirmed by the Official Handbook.

During the 2000s, Marvel began consistently numbering prominent alternate universes in the issues of the Official Handbook, beginning with one-shot handbooks published in 2004-2005 and later publishing a comprehensive numbered list in the Appendix to the Official Handbook of the Marvel Universe A to Z (2008). The list included designations for alternate universes seen in comics books such as Marvel Comics 2, Marvel 2099, and Exiles, but also various film and television series based on Marvel Comics, establishing adaptions in non-comic media as part of the wider Marvel Multiverse. At the end of the printed list, a link was provided for the online Appendix which remained consistently updated and as of 2026 is approaching 4,000 entries. The online list extended the designations to stories published by Marvel but lacking any familiar Marvel superheroes, including creator-owned stories published under the Epic Comics imprint, licensed comics including Heathcliff and ALF, and original series by CrossGen and Malibu Comics, publishers that were later fully acquired by Marvel. The classification system for alternate realities was devised, in part, by Mark Gruenwald.

Numeric designations originating from the Handbooks and the online Appendix have sporadically been used within Marvel Comics, video games, and the 2023 film Spider-Man: Across the Spider-Verse, confirming their canonicity. However, during the publication of the "Spider-Verse" storyline in 2014, writer Dan Slott had stated on Twitter that the numbers that appear in handbooks do not count, and only those that are published within "actual" stories do. This was in response to some reality numbers in the pages of Spider-Verse not matching the previous designations, such as the home reality of Spider-Ham, previously Earth-8311, being re-designated as Earth-25 instead. Subsequent Handbooks have dealt with contradictions both ways: while the attempted change of Spider-Ham's reality had been ignored, the home reality of Spider-Woman (Gwen Stacy) previously numbered by the online appendix had been adjusted to that used in the pages of the comics.

== Definitions ==
A glossary of terms was provided in the Official Handbook of the Marvel Universe A-Z Volume 2 (2008):

- Dimension - an area of interest containing space, time, matter, and energy. A dimension can be virtually infinite or clearly finite, "Earth-like" or guided by magic or alien physics.
- Universe - a single dimension, such as Earth-616, the Prime Marvel Universe.
- Reality - a collection of an Earth-like universe and the various other dimensions associated with it, such as the Microverse, the Dark Dimension, and the Negative Zone. Versions of these dimensions exist in most alternate realities.
- Multiverse - a collection of alternate realities with a similar nature and a universal hierarchy.
- Megaverse - a larger selection of alternate realities that lack a common hierarchy.
- Omniverse - a collection of every single universe and dimension. The Omniverse contains the real world plus every possible fictional reality, including all the works that are outside of Marvel's copyright restrictions, and therefore also outside the Marvel Multiverse. This was based on Mark Gruenwald's original definition of the term.

While the Official Handbook tends to stick to the nomenclature of "alternate realities", various comic writers had used "alternate universes", "alternate timelines", and "alternate dimensions" interchangeably.

== Fictional history ==
Originally, there was only one universe, the First Firmament. Due to the actions of Celestials existing there, it diverged. Then, the Multiverse went through several incarnations and eventually the Big Bang caused the existence of the Seventh Cosmos, where most well-known heroes originated. The Marvel multiverse is protected from imbalance by the Living Tribunal, a cosmic entity, who is one for the entire multiverse. It may act to prevent one universe from amassing more power than any of the others or from upsetting the cosmic balance in some way. It is only overseen by the One-Above-All, an omnipotent entity said to have created the entire Marvel Multiverse.

According to Forge, mutants living on these alternate Earths have lost their powers due to the M-Day happening on Earth-616, as stated in "Endangered Species". However, this mass depowering has not been seen in many of Marvel's current alternate reality publications such as the Exiles, the Ultimate Marvel titles, Amazing Spider-Girl, the Marvel Adventures titles or GeNext. This was apparently retconned during the "X-Men: Messiah Complex" storyline, where Forge stated that all mutants in possible future timelines were depowered, not in parallel universes. This, in addition to A.R.M.O.R.'s observation that Lyra arrived from an alternate reality indicates that the topology of the Marvel Multiverse is based on new realities branching off from key nodes of a timeline instead of strictly parallel dimensions.

In the 2015 Secret Wars series, a confrontation with the Beyonders over the fate of the various alternate versions of Molecule Man results in the destruction of the Multiverse, triggering various 'incursions' as Earths crash together and destroy each other, the Beyonders' assault culminating in Doctor Doom stealing the power of the remaining Beyonders and bringing the remaining universes together into a single 'Battleworld'. Molecule Man, who had been the source of Doom's power, transfers Doom's power to Mister Fantastic when Doom acknowledges that Reed would have done a better job as 'God' than he did. Having restored Earth-616 as it was before the Beyonders' incursions began, Mister Fantastic departs to recreate the multiverse with the company of his restored family. The seventh iteration of the Multiverse was destroyed and was reborn as the eighth.

== List of notable alternate universes ==
Below is a short, non-comprehensive list of some of the most noteworthy and significant universes in the Marvel Multiverse. Most of these were designated in the Official Handbook of the Marvel Universe in either the physical print or the digital Appendix.

| Name | First appearance | Notes |
|---|---|---|
| Earth-42 | Spider-Man: Across the Spider-Verse (June 2, 2023) | An alternate setting within the animated Spider-Verse franchise created by Phil Lord and Christopher Miller and David Callaham.; In this reality, there is no Spider-Man as a result of the spider intended for him being transported to Earth-1610B by Wilson Fisk's multiversal "super-collider" prior to the events of Spider-Man: Into the Spider-Verse, leaving Earth-42 infested with crime. Jefferson Davis was killed in action some time ago, while his son Miles Morales becomes involved with his uncle Aaron Davis' criminal activities, becoming an antiheroic version of the Prowler. |
| Earth-65 | Edge of Spider-Verse #2 (Nov. 2014) | Home universe of Spider-Woman (Gwen Stacy) and Kingpin (Matt Murdock); In this reality, Peter Parker was Gwen's best friend, who injected himself with Curt Connors' formula to become the Lizard. Peter later died from the after-effects of the serum, with Spider-Woman being publicly blamed for his death.; An alternate reality based on Earth-65 appears in the films Spider-Man: Into the Spider-Verse and Spider-Man: Across the Spider-Verse. |
| Earth-295 | X-Men: Alpha (January 1995) | Age of Apocalypse, reality where Apocalypse has successfully conquered North America, causing chaos and destruction across most of the world.; Home reality of the character Nate Grey, a counterpart of Cable. |
| Earth-311 | Marvel 1602 #1 (August 13, 2003) | Primary setting for the 1602 limited series written by Neil Gaiman and its various spin-off titles.; In this reality, Silver Age-era Marvel characters have awakened 400 years earlier in England. |
| Earth-358 | Marvel Tōkon: First Strike #1 (August 6, 2026) | Reality of the Arc System Works fighting game Marvel Tōkon: Fighting Souls and its tie-ins. |
| Earth-616 | Motion Picture Funnies Weekly #1 (1939) | The main setting of the Marvel Universe. Reality of the original Marvel Super Heroes and its mainstream continuity. Differences between universes are usually described in comparison with Earth-616.; An alternate reality based on Earth-616, called Earth-616B, appears in the film Spider-Man: Into the Spider-Verse and Spider-Man: Across the Spider-Verse. |
| Earth-688 | Venom (October 5, 2018) | Reality of Sony's Spider-Man Universe; Main setting of Venom, Venom: Let There Be Carnage, Morbius, Madame Web, Venom: The Last Dance and Kraven the Hunter. |
| Earth-712 | Avengers #85–86 (Feb.–March 1971) | Home universe of the Squadron Supreme, a superhero team that is a pastiche of the Justice League and other DC Comics characters. |
| Earth-811 | Uncanny X-Men #141 (1981) | The setting of Days of Future Past, a dystopic version of the near-distant future where mutants are actively hunted and sent to concentration camps, and whose timeline diverges from Earth-616 after the assassination of Robert Kelly. |
| Earth-928 | Spider-Man 2099 #1 (1992) | The 2099 Universe, an alternate future of Earth-616 set in 2099 with futuristic incarnations of Marvel heroes, villains and teams.; An alternate reality based on Earth-928 appears in Spider-Man: Into the Spider-Verse and Spider-Man: Across the Spider-Verse. |
| Earth-982 | What If? (vol. 2) #105 (1998) | Main setting of MC2. Home reality of Spider-Girl, J2, A-Next, Wild Thing, the Fantastic Five, and other children of the Marvel heroes and villains.; Set in an alternate version of Earth-616 in the late 1990s. |
| Earth-1048 | Spider-Man (2018 video game) (September 7, 2018) | Main setting of the Marvel's Spider-Man video game series developed by Insomniac Games and published by Sony Interactive Entertainment for PlayStation consoles and Microsoft Windows: Marvel's Spider-Man, Marvel's Spider-Man: Miles Morales, Marvel's Spider-Man 2, and Marvel's Wolverine, as well as associated media. |
| Earth-1136 | Miss Fury Special Limited Edition #1 (August 1991) | Main setting of the Genesis Universe by Malibu Comics. |
| Earth-1226 | M.O.D.O.K. (May 2021) | The setting of M.O.D.O.K. and Hit-Monkey television series. |
| Earth-1287 | Strikeforce: Morituri #01 (1986) | Reality where a scientist named Dr. Kimmo Tuolema in 2072 discovers a process which can provide humans with superhuman powers to fight back a ravaging alien invasion that started in 2069. |
| Earth-1298 | Mutant X #1 (August 1998) | The setting of Mutant X created by Howard Mackie and Tom Raney. |
| Earth-1610 | Ultimate Spider-Man #1 (2000) | The original Ultimate Marvel universe is the reinvention of the Marvel Universe for the modern age, Initially beginning with Ultimate Spider-Man and Ultimate X-Men.; Home reality of the Ultimates (this universe's counterparts of the Avengers) and Miles Morales.; This reality was destroyed during the events of Jonathan Hickman's Secret Wars miniseries (2015); later implied to have been restored in the Spider-Men II miniseries. |
| Earth-1610B | Spider-Man: Into the Spider-Verse (December 1, 2018) | Primary setting for the animated Spider-Verse franchise created by Phil Lord and Rodney Rothman.; The version of Peter Parker native to this reality was murdered by Kingpin, and subsequently succeeded by Miles Morales as Spider-Man.; In-universe, this reality is designated Earth-1610, homaging its similarities to the comics continuity of Earth-1610. |
| Earth-2149 | Ultimate Fantastic Four #21 (2005) | Reality of the original Marvel Zombies series, where an outbreak of a zombie virus that came from another alternate Earth turned all of its superheroes and supervillains into cannibalistic, flesh-eating zombies. |
| Earth-2301 | Marvel Mangaverse: New Dawn (March 2002) | Also known as the Marvel Mangaverse, an interpretation of Marvel characters through a manga format and aesthetic created by Ben Dunn.; The Peter Parker / Spider-Man of this reality appears in the film Spider-Man: Across the Spider-Verse. |
| Earth-5724 | Nick Fury: Agent of S.H.I.E.L.D. (film) (May 26, 1998) | Main setting of the 1998 Nick Fury film, with Nick Fury being portrayed by David Hasselhoff. |
| Earth-6109 | Marvel: Ultimate Alliance (October 24, 2006) | Primary setting of the first two games in the Marvel: Ultimate Alliance series. |
| Earth-6160 | Ultimate Invasion #1 (2023) | The setting for the rebooted Ultimate Universe which spun out from the events of the miniseries Ultimate Invasion (2023) by Jonathan Hickman and Bryan Hitch. This continuity serves as the setting for the eponymous Ultimate Universe #1 one-shot, as well as the new iterations of Ultimate Spider-Man, Ultimate X-Men, Ultimate Black Panther, The Ultimates, and future books under the relaunched Ultimate imprint.; The history of Earth-6160 was substantially altered by the original Ultimate Universe's Reed Richards / Maker, sabotaging the origins of many superheroes and creating a shadow government controlled by the Maker and his allies. |
| Earth-6799 | "The Power of Dr. Octopus" (September 9, 1967) | Setting of the 1967 Spider-Man series.; Sometimes also referred to as simply Earth-67, that designation is instead used for the comic book version of this reality. It also appeared in the post-credits scene of Spider-Man: Into the Spider-Verse (2018). |
| Earth-7642 | Superman vs. The Amazing Spider-Man #1 (Jan. 1976) | Created by Gerry Conway and Ross Andru.; A reality where Marvel and DC characters coexist with one another. It also includes characters from other franchises, such as Image Comics (particularly Extreme Studios, WildStorm, and Top Cow), Archie, Shi, Painkiller Jane, IDW's Transformers, and more. |
| Earth-7964 | X-Men Legends (September 24, 2004) | Primary setting for the video games X-Men Legends and its sequel X-Men Legends II: Rise of Apocalypse. |
| Earth-8096 | "Hindsight (Part 1)" (January 23, 2009) | Main setting of Wolverine and the X-Men, The Avengers: Earth's Mightiest Heroes, Hulk Vs. and Thor: Tales of Asgard. |
| Earth-8101 | Marvel Apes #1 (2008) | Reality in which all Marvel characters are sentient primates. |
| Earth-8107 | "Bubble, Bubble, Oil and Trouble" (September 12, 1981) | Main setting of the 1981 Spider-Man animated series, its companion series Spider-Man and His Amazing Friends, and the 1982 animated series The Incredible Hulk. |
| Earth-8311 | Marvel Tails #1 (1983) | The Larval Universe is the home reality of Peter Porker, the Spectacular Spider-Ham and various intelligent animal parodies of the Marvel characters. |
| Earth-9591 | Ruins #1 (1995) | The setting of the Ruins miniseries, a satire of Marvels.; A reality where "whatever can go wrong will", meaning any event that gave would give someone superpowers instead results in death or extreme mutation or deformity. |
| Earth-9602 | Amalgam Comics (April 1996 – June 1997) | An amalgamation of the Marvel and DC universes that occurred during the DC vs. Marvel crossover event.; Characters from both franchises were merged to create new ones (e.g., DC Comics' Batman and Marvel Comics' Wolverine become the Amalgam Comics character Dark Claw). |
| Earth-9997 | Earth X #0 (Jan. 1999) | The setting of Earth X, created by Alex Ross and Jim Krueger. |
| Earth-11052 | X-Men: Evolution (November 2000 – October 2003) | Main setting of the animated series X-Men: Evolution. |
| Earth-11714 | Spider-Man: Turn Off the Dark (June 14, 2011 – January 4, 2014) | Primary setting for the Broadway musical Spider-Man: Turn Off The Dark and its characters with music and lyrics written by Bono and The Edge. The plot of the show is inspired by the events of Earth-616 and the Sam Raimi films. |
| Earth-12041 | "Great Power" (April 1, 2012) | The setting of the animated series featured on Disney XD: Ultimate Spider-Man, Avengers Assemble, Hulk and the Agents of S.M.A.S.H. and Hulk: Where Monsters Dwell. |
| Earth-12131 | Marvel Avengers Alliance (March 1, 2012) | Primary setting of the Marvel Avengers Alliance game series. |
| Earth-13122 | Lego Marvel Super Heroes (October 22, 2013) | Main setting of Lego Marvel video games Lego Marvel Super Heroes and Lego Marvel Super Heroes 2. |
| Earth-13625 | Deadpool (video game) (June 25, 2013) | Main setting for the 2013 Deadpool video game. |
| Earth-14042 | "The Mightiest of Heroes!" (April 2, 2014) | Main setting of Marvel Disk Wars: The Avengers.; This Earth shares the normal conventions of the Marvel universe until Loki traps the Avengers in experimental devices called DISKs. Five children are assigned by the Avengers to take possession of the DISKs and use them to bring out the Avengers to fight villains. |
| Earth-14123 | Big Hero 6 (November 7, 2014) | Main setting of the 2014 Big Hero 6 film, an alternate history world with San Fransokyo instead of San Francisco, as well as the sequel series Big Hero 6: The Series and Baymax!. |
| Earth-15866 | Fantastic Four (August 4, 2015) | Setting for the 2015 film Fantastic Four directed by Josh Trank.; This film was originally meant to take place in the same reality as the X-Men film series also produced by Fox, crossing over with various characters from the films, but due to its critical and financial failure at the box-office, 20th Century Fox cancelled all plans to continue with the franchise. |
| Earth-17040 | "Chapter 1" (February 8, 2017) | Primary setting for the FX television series Legion.; Harry Lloyd portrays an alternate iteration of Charles Xavier in this reality with similar characteristics to the versions of Charles Xavier present on Earth-10005 and in X-Men: Days of Future Past. |
| Earth-17372 | "eXposed" (October 2, 2017) | Setting for the Fox television series The Gifted. |
| Earth-17628 | "Origins" (August 1, 2015) | Reality of Marvel's Guardians of the Galaxy, Marvel's Spider-Man and Avengers: Black Panther's Quest (the fifth season of Avengers Assemble). |
| Earth-17741 | "Destroy the Avengers" (July 22, 2017) | Main setting of the anime series Marvel Future Avengers. |
| Earth-18878 | "Ghost Hunter" (August 13, 2018) | Main setting of the Marvel Rising franchise, including Marvel Rising: Secret Warriors.; In this reality, America Chavez is an alien originating from another planet instead of the Utopian Parallel. |
| Earth-10022 | Planet Hulk (February 2, 2010) | Main setting of the Planet Hulk film. |
| Earth-20051 | Marvel Adventures Spider-Man #1 (March 2005) | Main setting of Marvel Adventures, an all-age series not directly tied to then-current Marvel continuity. |
| Earth-20824 | Spider-Man (2000 video game) (September 1, 2000) | Setting for the 2000 Spider-Man game, its 2001 sequel Spider-Man 2: Enter Electro, as well as X-Men: Mutant Academy, X-Men: Mutant Academy 2 and X-Men: Next Dimension. |
| Earth-21178 | Marvel's Guardians of the Galaxy (October 25, 2021) | Main setting for the 2021 Guardians of the Galaxy video game. |
| Earth-21642 | "WEB-STER" (June 2021) | The setting of Disney Junior's Spidey and His Amazing Friends and its spin-off Iron Man and His Awesome Friends. |
| Earth-21798 | Heroes Reborn #1 (2021) | Main setting of Heroes Reborn (2021).; Reality where the Avengers never formed and the Squadron Supreme protects Earth. |
| Earth-21923 | Old Man Logan #1 (May 2015) | Alternate version of Earth-807128, from which Old Man Logan traveled into the present day of Earth-616. |
| Earth-26496 | "Survival of the Fittest" (March 8, 2008) | The setting of The Spectacular Spider-Man television series created by Greg Weisman and Victor Cook.; The Peter Parker / Spider-Man of this reality makes a cameo appearance in the film Spider-Man: Across the Spider-Verse. |
| Earth-30847 | The Punisher (1993) | Main setting of the Marvel vs. Capcom video game series, which also includes the beat-em-up arcade game The Punisher, the fighting games X-Men: Children of the Atom, Marvel Super Heroes, X-Men vs. Street Fighter and Marvel Super Heroes vs. Street Fighter, as well as the console beat-em-up Marvel Super Heroes in War of the Gems; In this universe, Marvel and Capcom characters exist in two adjacent realities, which briefly converge to stage combat between participants from both worlds.; The Peter Parker / Spider-Man of this reality appears in Spider-Verse #2 (January 2015). |
| Earth-32102 | "Moon Girl Landing" (February 2023) | The setting of the Moon Girl and Devil Dinosaur animated series. |
| Earth-38264 | Marvel's Avengers (September 4, 2020) | Main setting for the 2020 Marvel's Avengers game. |
| Earth-40081 | Powerless #1 (August 2004) | The setting of the Powerless limited series.; A reality where superpowers do not exist. |
| Earth-45828 | Razorline: The First Cut #1 (Sept. 1993) | The setting of Clive Barker's Razorline imprint, Home reality of Ectokid, Saint Sinner, Hyperkind and Hokum & Hex.; First numbered in Alternate Universes 2005. |
| Earth-47281 | Punisher: War Zone (December 5, 2008) | Setting for the film Punisher: War Zone directed by Lexi Alexander. |
| Earth-51778 | Spider-Man (Japanese TV series) (May 1978 – March 1979) | Main setting of the Japanese Spider-Man TV series, also known as Supaidāman.; In this Earth, Spider-Man is a Japanese man called Takuya Yamashiro. |
| Earth-58163 | House of M (June—Nov. 2005) | A world created by the Scarlet Witch where mutants are the dominant species instead of humans. |
| Earth-58470 | Howard the Duck (film) (August 1, 1986) | Main setting of the 1986 film Howard the Duck. |
| Earth-58627 | The Punisher (1989 film) (October 5, 1989) | Setting for the 1989 film The Punisher directed by Mark Goldblatt. |
| Earth-58732 | The Punisher (2004 film) (April 16, 2004) | Main setting for the 2004 The Punisher film directed by Jonathan Hensleigh. |
| Earth-88194 | Dr. Zero #1 (1988) | The setting of Shadowline, created by Archie Goodwin under the Epic Comics imprint as a mature-themed line for Marvel Comics.; Home reality of Doctor Zero, Power Line and St. George, and the origin of Terror Inc.; First numbered in Alternate Universes 2005. |
| Earth-90214 | Spider-Man Noir #1 (Feb. 2009) | The setting of Marvel Noir, a universe in the 1920s–1930s that has few superhumans with developed superpowers and combines elements of film noir and pulp magazines.; This reality was adapted in the Spider-Man: Into the Spider-Verse animated film and the Spider-Noir live-action series. |
| Earth-92131 | "Night of the Sentinels" (Part 1) (October 31, 1992) | Setting of X-Men: The Animated Series, Spider-Man: The Animated Series, and X-Men '97. |
| Earth-93060 | Hardcase #1 (June 1993) | Main setting of the Ultraverse, a universe with the powers of its superheroes (also known as Ultras) originating from a flat planet called the Godwheel, with magic civilizations on one side and advanced ones on the other.; Home reality of Prime, Night Man, Hardcase, Mantra, UltraForce, and The Strangers. |
| Earth-121347 | Ghost Rider (February 16, 2007) | Setting for the films Ghost Rider and Ghost Rider: Spirit of Vengeance. |
| Earth-135263 | "Doomsday" (September 16, 2006) | The setting of the animated series Fantastic Four: World's Greatest Heroes. |
| Earth-148611 | Star Brand #1 (Oct. 1986) | The setting of the New Universe. Created by Jim Shooter, Archie Goodwin, Eliot R. Brown, John Morelli, Mark Gruenwald, Tom DeFalco, and Michael Higgins.; Home reality of DP 7, Psi-Force, Star Brand, Justice, Nightmask, Spitfire and the Troubleshooters, Mark Hazzard and Kickers Inc. |
| Earth-400005 | The Incredible Hulk (1978 TV series) (November 1977 – May 1982) | Main setting of the 1977 The Incredible Hulk TV series. |
| Earth-400083 | Hulk (June 20, 2003) | Setting for the 2003 film Hulk directed by Ang Lee. |
| Earth-534834 | "And the Sea Shall Give Up Its Dead" (September 24, 1994) | Reality designation for the animated series part of the Marvel Action Hour programming block.; Setting for Iron Man: The Animated Series, the 1994 Fantastic Four television series and the 1996 television series, The Incredible Hulk. |
| Earth-634962 | "The Origin of the Silver Surfer" (February 7, 1998) | Main setting of the 1998 Silver Surfer animated series. |
| Earth-700029 | Generation X (February 20, 1996) | Main setting of the Generation-X television film. |
| Earth-730784 | The Avengers: United They Stand (October 1999 – February 2000) | Main setting of the 1999 animated series The Avengers: United They Stand. |
| Earth-760207 | "Heroes and Villains" (August 22, 2003) | The setting of the television series Spider-Man: The New Animated Series, based on the 2002 Spider-Man film but diverging from its sequels in significant details. |
| Earth-807128 | Wolverine (vol. 3) #66 (Aug. 2008) | The setting of Old Man Logan where the supervillains united and killed all of the superheroes, then divided up the world into their respective territories. |
| Earth-904913 | "Iron, Forged in Fire" (April 24, 2009) | Main setting of the Iron Man: Armored Adventures animated series. |

== See also ==
- Marvel Universe
- Multiverse (DC Comics)

== Bibliography ==
- Marvel Encyclopedia Volume 6: Fantastic Four (November 2004)
- Official Handbook of the Marvel Universe: Alternate Universes 2005
- Marvel Legacy: The 1960s Handbook (2006)
- Marvel Legacy: The 1970s Handbook (2006)
- Marvel Legacy: The 1980s Handbook (2006)
- Marvel Legacy: The 1990s Handbook (2007)
