= Paris Cullins =

American comics artist

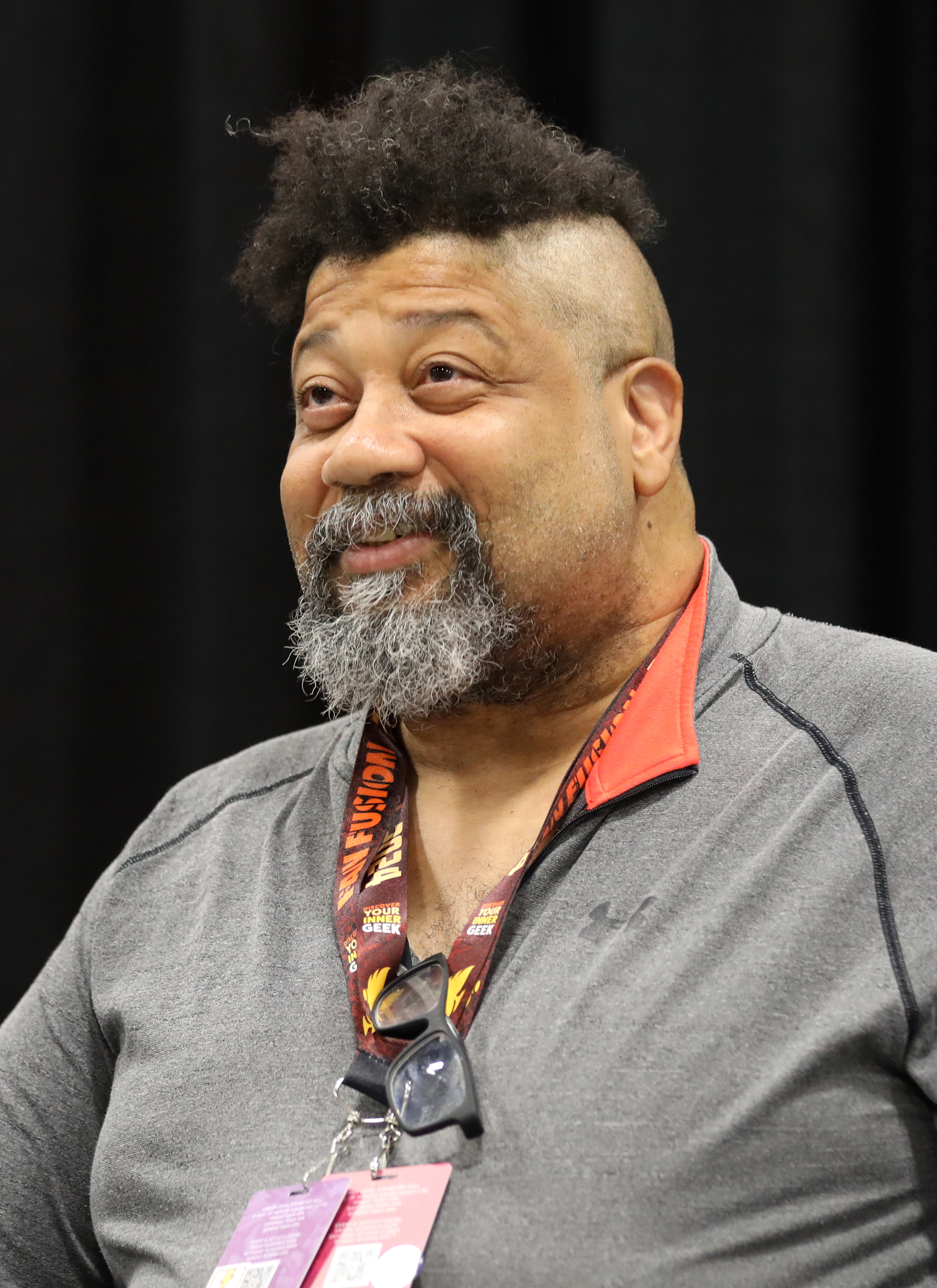
- Cullins in 2024
- Born: 1960 (age 65–66) Philadelphia, Pennsylvania, U.S.
- Areas: Penciller, Colorist, Artist, Cover
- Notable works: Blue Beetle; Blue Devil; Hyperkind

Paris Cullins (born 1960) is an American comics artist best known for his work on DC Comics' Blue Devil and Blue Beetle, and Hyperkind from the Marvel Comics imprint Razorline.

== Early life ==
Paris Cullins was born in Philadelphia, Pennsylvania and raised in its North Philadelphia section. He credits his mother, who "had a great appreciation for art and for comic books," for exposing him to comics as a child. His father was a touring jazz musician and also an artist who specialized in landscapes. At 11 years old, he said, he got his first paying job as an artist drawing for a coloring book company. As he grew older, Cullins did art for a variety of outlets, including Larami Toys, the afterschool-TV show Wee Willie Webber Colorful Cartoon Club on Philadelphia's WPHL-TV, and a holiday card manufacturer.

== Career ==
=== Early career ===
Cullins had sent DC Comics samples of his comic art since 1976, finally meeting with Dick Giordano in the last week of 1979. Cullins recalled in 2007 that,

I brought new pages and he loved it. The pages were Batman vs. Manhunter. I did it on a lark. He then told me, ..."Come in the first day after New Year's and I'll have a script for you, and talk to you about the [DC intern] program." I came in on January 2nd and he gave me a script that day. ... When I started with them they had me doing some horror stories ... I also did one feature in particular, called "I, Vampire."

Cullins' first known credited comics work was as penciler-inker of the six-page story "Mystic Murder", by writer Steve Skeates, in the DC Comics supernatural anthology Secrets of Haunted House #42 (Nov. 1981). He drew four "I ... Vampire" stories in the House of Mystery series and pencilled stories in such similar DC titles as Ghosts, The Unexpected, and Weird War Tales through the early 1980s, and made his superhero debut penciling an eight-page "Tales of the Green Lantern Corps" backup feature in Green Lantern #154 (July 1982). As well, artist Ernie Colón, whom Cullins met at DC and who drew Richie Rich and other children's titles for Harvey Comics, "offered me a job doing some extra work for Harvey Comics. For several months I drew Richie Rich and Hot Stuff.

=== "Blue" period ===
Blue Devil #1 (June 1984). Cover art by Cullins and Dick Giordano.

After co-penciling Justice League of America #212 (March 1983) with Rich Buckler, and making his cover debut with The Daring New Adventures of Supergirl #7, Cullins penciled his first full-length comic, Blue Devil #1 (June 1984), starring a superhero he had co-created with writers Gary Cohn and Dan Mishkin earlier that month for a backup feature in The Fury of Firestorm #24 (June 1984).

The character Blue Devil came about, Cullins said, through "a little story in House of Mystery that was supposed to be, and here's the truth for that, it was originally designed a short story for Steve Ditko and it was supposed to be like a superhero story, but a monster superhero story, but a short one. He said, 'No.' He didn't want to do it and then they asked me."

Blue Devil ran 31 issues, through cover–date December 1986, with Cullins penciling the first six and Blue Devil Annual #1 (1985), and covers through the end of the run. Cullins additionally drew dozens of DC covers and occasional stories through the decade, and numerous character pages for Who's Who: The Definitive Directory of the DC Universe. Cullins and writer Len Wein produced a Ted Kord Blue Beetle series for DC, which had acquired the character from the defunct Charlton Comics. Cullins penciled issues #1–9, 11–14, and 17–18 (collectively, June 1986–Nov. 1987). He was one of the artists on Batman #400 (Oct. 1986).

Cullins began working for Marvel Comics by penciling three six–page High Evolutionary backup stories, one each in the 1988 X-Factor Annual #3, The Punisher Annual #1, and Silver Surfer Annual #1. He was still freelancing primarily for DC, collaborating there with writer J. M. DeMatteis on a six-issue miniseries revival (Feb.–July 1988) of Jack Kirby's The Forever People, penciling the stories and covers. Cullins said, "I had been given a choice between doing a run of Batman, or one of my life long dreams I being a Jack Kirby enthusiast, The Forever People. You can guess which one I took. That book changed my professional career as well." His work there drew attention and led to assignments for Neal Adams' studio Continuity Associates, "for several advertising companies, and I did work for a newspaper for the elderly called the Grey Panthers. ... Meanwhile at DC, I took a job in specialty projects and I did their DC superhero trading cards. I was the major designer artist for the first year, as well as their secondary illustrator for their Batman animation licensing bible. This is the way it went for years."

With writer Mark Evanier, primarily, Cullins co-plotted and penciled issues #1–9, 11–12, and 15–18 (collectively, Feb. 1989–July 1990) of a revival of Kirby's The New Gods.

=== Later career ===
Hyperkind #8 (April 1994). Cover art by Cullins and Bob Petrecca.

In the 1990s, Cullins, while keeping DC as his home base, branched out to draw additional occasional comics for Marvel, and for publishers including Acclaim Comics, Massive Comics Group, Penthouse International (Penthouse Comix), and Crusade Comics. Teamed with writer Fred Burke, Cullins penciled stories for eight of the nine issues of the superhero-team comic Hyperkind, for Marvel's Clive Barker–created Razorline imprint, and the covers for all. He also drew the cover of a 48-page one-shot, Hyperkind: Unleashed (cover-dated Sept. 1994, dated Aug. 1994 in indicia).

He was largely absent from comics from 1996, when he did pencil breakdowns for DC's Life, the Universe and Everything #1, to 2001, when he penciled the cover of DC/OnStar's Onstar Batman Special Edition #1. Cullins contributed a one-page Blazin' Glory pinup to Atomeka Press' A1 Sketchbook (Nov. 2004), his last known comics work as of 2007.

At some point, Cullins did book-cover art and "worked for advertisement agencies, and did storyboards for video games and TV commercials, Activision in particular, and full-color storyboards and designs for a game called Terror in the Bermuda Triangle".

In December 2006, the Philadelphia, Pennsylvania-based Maximum Overtime Media announced the first-quarter 2007 planned premiere of Gritz n' Gravy, "a quarterly illustrated adult urban fantasy and popular-culture national magazine", with Cullins, a company co-founder, announced as publisher.

In May 2011, DC Comics announced he would be the artist, paired with writer William Messner-Loebs, on Wonder Woman - The '90s, a one-shot in DC's nostalgic DC Retroactive series. However, the book would be drawn by Lee Moder and Dan Green rather than Cullins.

== Bibliography ==
=== Atomeka Press ===
- A1 #1 (1989)

=== Crusade Comics ===
- Shi: Senryaku #1 (1995)
- Shi: The Way of the Warrior #10 (1996)

=== DC Comics ===
- Action Comics #576, 580 (1986)
- Animal Man #22 (1990)
- Batman #400 (1986)
- Blue Beetle #1–9, 11–14, 17–18 (1986–1987)
- Blue Devil #1–6, Annual #1 (1984–1985)
- Captain Atom Annual #2 (1988)
- Checkmate #14 (1989)
- Detective Comics #527–529 (Green Arrow backup stories) (1983)
- Doom Force Special #1 (1992)
- Forever People vol. 2 #1–6 (1988)
- The Fury of Firestorm #24 (Blue Devil insert preview) (1984)
- Ghosts #110 (1982)
- Green Arrow vol. 2 #8 (1988)
- Green Lantern vol. 2 #154, 156, Annual #3 (1982–1987)
- Hawk and Dove vol. 3 #10, Annual #2 (1990–1991)
- Heroes Against Hunger #1 (1986)
- House of Mystery #311, 315–317 ("I...Vampire" feature) (1982–1983)
- Justice League America #50 (1991)
- Justice League of America #212 (1983)
- Legion of Super-Heroes vol. 3 #21 (1986)
- Legion of Super-Heroes vol. 4 #9 (1990)
- Life, the Universe and Everything #1 (1996)
- New Gods vol. 3 #1–15, 17–18 (1989–1990)
- The New Teen Titans Annual vol. 2 #4 (1988)
- The New Titans #79–80, Annual #6 (1990–1991)
- Omega Men #27 (1985)
- Scooby-Doo #94, 99 (2005)
- Secret Origins vol. 2 #41, 48 (1989–1990)
- Secrets of Haunted House #42 (1981)
- Superboy vol. 3 #13 (1991)
- Superman vol. 2 #31 (1989)
- The Unexpected #220 (1982)
- Valor #9 (1993)
- Vigilante #15 (1985)
- The Warlord #102 (1986)
- Weird War Tales #113, 121 (1982–1983)
- Who's Who in the DC Universe #1–3, 9–10, 12 (1990–1991)
- Who's Who in the Legion of Super-Heroes #4 (1988)
- Who's Who: The Definitive Directory of the DC Universe #3, 5–6, 8, 11–12, 16, 24 (1985–1987)
- Who's Who: Update '87 #1 (1987)
- Wonder Woman vol. 2 #65–71 (1992–1993)

==== DC Comics/United States Postal Service ====
- Celebrate the Century [Super Heroes Stamp Album] #10 (2000)

=== Marvel Comics ===
- The Amazing Spider-Man Annual #25 (1991)
- Cage #14 (1993)
- Clive Barker's Hellraiser #7, 11 (1991–1992)
- Hyperkind #1–7, 9 (1993–1994)
- The Punisher Annual #1 (1988)
- Saint Sinner #1 (1993)
- Silver Surfer Annual #1 (1988)
- Web of Spider-Man Annual #7 (1991)
- What If...? vol. 2 #51 (1993)
- X-Factor Annual #3 (1988)

=== Massive Comics Group ===
- Tales from the Aniverse #2 (1991)

=== NBM ===
- WWE Superstars (2013 series) #11-12 (2015)
- WWE Superstars (2014 series) #3 (2015)
- WWE: Slam City #2 (2015)

=== Penthouse ===
- Omni Comix #3 (1995)
- Penthouse Comix #2 (1994)

=== Valiant Comics ===
- Magnus, Robot Fighter #0, 6, 49 (1991–1995)

Preceded by n/a	Blue Devil artist 1984	Succeeded by Gil Kane
Preceded by n/a	Blue Beetle artist 1986–1987	Succeeded by Ross Andru
