= Saint Sinner (film) =

2002 American television film

- Genre: Horror
- Based on: Story by Clive Barker
- Screenplay by: Doris Egan; Hans Rodionoff
- Directed by: Joshua Butler
- Starring: Greg Serano; Gina Ravera; Mary Mara; Rebecca Harrell; William B. Davis; Antonio Cupo
- Theme music composer: Christopher Lennertz
- Countries of origin: United States; Canada
- Original language: English

Production
- Producer: Oscar L. Costo
- Cinematography: Barry Donlevy
- Editor: Sean Albertson
- Running time: 90 min.
- Production company: Seraphim Films

Original release
- Network: Sci Fi Channel
- Release: October 26, 2002

Saint Sinner (full title Clive Barker Presents Saint Sinner) is a 2002 horror television film written by Doris Egan and Hans Rodionoff based on a short story by executive producer Clive Barker. It was directed by Joshua Butler. Aside from the title, it is unrelated to the comic-book series published by Marvel Comics' Razorline imprint and created by Barker. In this film, an immortal monk hunts down two succubi. It premiered on the U.S. Sci Fi Channel on October 26, 2002.

== Plot ==
In 1815 California, Father Michael, an emissary of Pope Pius VII, has traveled to meet with novice monk Brother Tomas. The young monk's order serves as the secret repository for evil, supernatural objects collected by the Church, and kept there for safekeeping. Michael delivers an ancient statue that has trapped two beautiful female demons, Munkar and Nakir. Tomas and his friend Brother Gregory inadvertently release the murderous demons, who travel to the 21st century using the monastery's Wheel of Time.

As his brother lies dying, he is given a chance to redeem himself by going through the Wheel of Time with a sacred dagger previously used by Saint Nicodemus to imprison the succubi. Tomas reluctantly intends to track down the evil creatures and destroy them. The young monk takes on the task, traveling through the Wheel only to discover a future world he does not understand in present-day Seattle, Washington, where he allies with police detective Rachel Dressler to recapture the homicidal terrors.

While the creatures seek to satisfy their centuries-long hunger, Tomas discovers their first victim. The police arrive on the murder scene and take Tomas into custody, believing he may be involved. Detective Rachel Dressler (Ravera) isn't about to believe Tomas' weird story, but strange things start to happen and bodies begin to pile up. Both Tomas and Rachel soon discover that the only way to stop these horrifying demons will be to take a leap of faith.

== Cast ==
- Greg Serano as Brother Tomas
- Gina Ravera as Detective Rachel Dressler
- Mary Mara as Munkar
- Rebecca Harrell as Nakir
- William B. Davis as Father Michael
- Antonio Cupo as Brother Gregory
- Jay Brazeau as Abbot
- Simon Wong as Wade
- Boyan Vukelic as Playland Guard
- Brian Drummond as Officer #1
- Peter Bryant as Officer #2
- Lisa Dahling as Officer #3
- Kris Pope as Brother Rafael
- Robin Mossley as Clark
- Donna Yamamoto as Irate Mother
- Justine Wong as Little Girl
- David Thomson as Vince

== In other media ==
The telefilm's title originated with the Barker-created 1993 comic book Saint Sinner from Marvel Comics' Razorline imprint. In Barker's words: "I was always disappointed with the way that Marvel handled that entire line of comics, particularly Saint Sinner. I thought that's a waste of a good title. It was something that called for finding a new life in some way or another".
