= Terror Inc. =

Comic book series

- Cover of the first issue.

Publication information
- Publisher: Marvel Comics
- First appearance: (As Shreck); St. George #2 (Aug. 1988) (As Terror); Daredevil #305 (June 1992)
- Created by: D. G. Chichester; Margaret Clark; Klaus Janson

In-story information
- Team affiliations: Heroes for Hire; Mercs for Money
- Notable aliases: Shreck, Terror
- Abilities: Skilled armed and unarmed combatant Immortality; Ability to incorporate the body parts of others into his own form

Terror Inc. was an American comic-book horror series from Marvel Comics starring the antihero Terror, an eternal entity that absorbs the talents of others through their dismembered limbs. He was created by writers Dan Chichester and Margaret Clark and artist Klaus Janson and first appeared as the villain Shreck in St. George #2 (August 1988), from Marvel's Epic Comics imprint.

== Publication history ==
Terror was created for Marvel's Epic Comics line as part of writer Chichester's Shadowline Saga of three interconnected titles. There were no superheroes in this world, but rather powerful, ageless beings known as "Shadows". In St. George #2 (August 1988), Chichester and co-writer Margaret Clark introduced a green-skinned killer who acted as the enforcer for the Ravenscore crime family, one of the books' recurring villains.

According to Chichester, Marvel contacted him about bringing Shreck from the Shadowline books into the mainstream Marvel Universe to serve as a platform for reinventing and reintroducing the company's 1970s horror characters, such as Werewolf by Night and Morbius, but subsequent publishing plans changed directions.

The series Terror, Inc. was set for 15 issues but only ran for 13 issues, cover-dated July 1992 to July 1993. After guest-starring in Wolverine #58 and the "Dead Man's Hand" Daredevil/Punisher crossover, Terror next appeared in 2006's "League of Losers" storyline in Marvel Team-Up. He later appeared in Deadpool Vol. 6 issues #1 to #17. He also appeared in a mini around the same time called "Deadpool & the Mercs for Money".

Terror, Inc. editor Marc McLaurin maintained that Shreck and Terror are different characters. Writer Dan Chichester said: "Shreck was Terror and Terror was Shreck ... but for the fact that Terror got to develop more of a backstory as time went on".

The comic books themselves gave no confirmation either way. Eventually, the Official Handbook of the Marvel Universe Horror 2005 confirmed that the two were in fact the same being.

== Fictional character biography ==
Terror originates from the universe Earth-88194 in the Marvel multiverse. He was originally a human in ancient times who killed a bear-like demon and was cursed into a monstrous form resembling it, gaining the ability to merge the limbs of others onto his body. By the Dark Ages, he assumes the Germanic term "Schreck" (scare, fright) as his name.

Shreck later becomes the squire to a powerful Shadow named Draghignazzo. After being injured in battle, Draghignazzo has Shreck bury him so that he can heal over the next couple centuries. In the meantime, Shreck becomes a knight and falls in love with a woman named Talita who is later killed in battle.

In the modern day, Shreck reunites with Draghignazzo, who has fully healed and begun posing as the superhero Dr. Zero. Through unknown means, he travels to the main universe of Earth-616 and becomes a mercenary and assassin. In Deadpool (vol. 6), Terror temporarily joins Deadpool's Mercs for Money.

== Powers and abilities ==
Terror has the ability to replace lost body parts with limbs and organs taken from other organisms. He secretes a natural acid that serves as both solvent and glue: the substance loosens the connective tissues in the target body, allowing him to more easily rend the parts he needs. Upon grafting the new pieces to his body, Terror gains the previous owner's last memories and emotions, including sights, sounds, or sensations which they once experienced. The spikes on his face can be removed and used as weapons, and if lost or damaged will regrow.

Since his body is dead, many conventional attacks have no effect on Terror. He can survive being impaled, crushed or drowned. The only limit are injuries that incapacitate or restrict him physically.

The MAX version of Terror possesses a powerful healing factor and vein-like tentacles.

== Other versions ==
=== Marvel Team-Up: League of Losers ===
Terror co-stars in an arc of writer Robert Kirkman's Marvel Team-Up vol. 3, featuring a group of heroes dubbed "The League of Losers". A villain named Chronok comes to the present and kills almost all of Marvel's heroes, and the survivors (including Terror) work to change the timeline and prevent him from doing so.

=== Ultimate Marvel ===
A character based on Terror named Terry Schreck appears in All-New Ultimates. This version is an NYPD detective who is disfigured and develops telepathy after nearly being killed by Styx.

=== Marvel MAX ===
An alternate universe variant of Terror appears in a self-titled Max miniseries. This version is a former warlord who took part in the Sack of Rome and was cursed after killing a mare sent by the Pope to kill him.

=== Deadpool Kills the Marvel Universe Again ===
An alternate universe variant of Terror from Earth-71986 appears in Deadpool Kills the Marvel Universe Again #3, where he is killed by a brainwashed Deadpool.

== Collected editions ==
Title	Material Collected	Published Date	ISBN
Terror, Inc.	Terror, Inc. (vol. 2) #1–5	July 2, 2008	978-0785127567
Terror, Inc.: Apocalypse Soon	Terror, Inc.: Apocalypse Soon #1–5	November 18, 2009	978-0785131854
