= Marvels =

Limited series comic book

- Marvels #1, cover art by Alex Ross.

Publication information
- Publisher: Marvel Comics
- Schedule: Monthly
- Format: Limited series
- Genre: Superhero
- Publication date: January – April 1994
- No. of issues: 4 + #0

Creative team
- Created by: Kurt Busiek; Alex Ross
- Written by: Kurt Busiek
- Artist: Alex Ross
- Letterer(s): John Gaushell; Richard Starkings
- Colorist: Alex Ross
- Editor: Marcus McLaurin

Collected editions
- 10th Anniversary Edition: ISBN 0-7851-1388-6

Marvels is a four-issue miniseries comic book written by Kurt Busiek, painted by Alex Ross and edited by Marcus McLaurin. It was published by Marvel Comics in 1994.

Taking place between 1939 and 1974, the series examines the Marvel Universe, the collective setting of most of Marvel's superhero series, from the perspective of an everyman character, news photographer Phil Sheldon. The street-level series portrays ordinary life in a world full of costumed superhumans, with each issue featuring major events in the Marvel Universe as observed by Sheldon.

Marvels won multiple awards and established the careers of Busiek and Ross, who would both return to the "everyday life in a superhero universe" theme in the Image Comics (later Homage Comics and currently DC Comics) series, Astro City.

== Publication history ==
Marvels was a four-issue miniseries (cover dated January–April 1994) by writer Kurt Busiek, with painted art by Alex Ross and editing by Marcus McLaurin. It was followed by issue #0 (August 1994) containing a 12-page story of the original 1940s Human Torch by Busiek and Ross, two text articles, and 18 pages of Ross superhero pinups. The series was later collected into a trade-paperback edition.

== Plot ==
=== "A Time of Marvels" ===
In 1939, Jim Hammond, the original Human Torch is created by scientist Phineas Horton, and the project is considered a success until the android is discovered to ignite when exposed to air. Horton shows his creation to the public, which is met with demands to destroy it. A dejected Horton begins to bury the android, but the chamber cracks, allowing in air and enabling the Human Torch to escape. The android describes his appearance as the beginning of a "golden age".

Meanwhile, Phil Sheldon, an aspiring photographer, and a young J. Jonah Jameson are shocked by the sudden emergence of multiple super-powered individuals, whom Sheldon dubs "Marvels". Sheldon is more confused than Jameson by the spectacle and, worried, seeks the support of his fiancée, Doris Jacquet. More unusual beings begin to appear, notably Namor the Sub-Mariner, and fights erupt between him and the Human Torch. Sheldon, feeling it would be irresponsible for him to raise children in a world where these Marvels run rampant, breaks off his engagement with Doris. It is only when Captain America is unveiled to the world that Sheldon becomes less apprehensive about the Marvels. When World War II begins, Sheldon, Doris, and many others see the Marvels in newsreels joining forces with the Allies, providing public reassurance. After rekindling his romance with Doris, Sheldon hears that the Human Torch and Namor are fighting again, and the battle this time damages several New York City landmarks. During the fight, the duo come near but do not directly encounter Sheldon; he is knocked out by a small chunk of masonry and blinded in his left eye. Still, he has lost all fears of the Marvels and goes on to marry Doris. Sheldon becomes a war correspondent in Europe, reporting on the Allied Forces and the Marvels as they combat the Nazis and Axis forces.

=== "Monsters" ===
In the early 1960s, Sheldon is now the father of two girls, Beth and Jennie, and he is preparing to write a book called Marvels. New York now has two superhero teams, the Fantastic Four and the Avengers. Sheldon is excited by recent news of the return of Captain America, but the public has begun to fear mutants, especially the mutant team known as the X-Men. As he covers an anti-mutant mob that comes face-to-face with the X-Men, he overhears X-Men leader Cyclops ordering his teammates not to engage with the mob, saying "they're not worth it" and leaving. Sheldon, unsure of their meaning, finds the words staying with him. Despite the public's distrust of the X-Men, some Marvels are treated as celebrities, as seen by Sheldon at the gala opening of Alicia Masters' sculptures, where gossip spreads over the upcoming marriage of the Fantastic Four's Reed Richards and Susan Storm. Sheldon leaves the gala and rushes home after hearing about an anti-mutant mob near there, and he finds his daughters hiding their friend, a mutant girl with a skull-like head named Maggie. Sheldon sees the importance of hiding this girl, but is worried for his family. Following the wedding, mutant-hunting robots called Sentinels are unleashed by Bolivar Trask during a televised debate with Charles Xavier; they malfunction and begin rampaging throughout the city. A mob forms in the chaos, attacking and destroying everything in sight, with only Sheldon helping the injured. The repaired Sentinels stop the mob, but Sheldon returns home to find the mutant girl gone.

=== "Judgement Day" ===
As the 1960s progress, Sheldon is preoccupied with his work, to the detriment of his family. The news is filled with stories of the Avengers being declared a menace, the law going after Tony Stark, sightings of Spider-Man, and a possible Judgement Day. The Silver Surfer appears to the world and defeats the Fantastic Four, heralding the appearance of Galactus. With the city in panic, Sheldon believes the Earth will end, and he returns home to be with his family in the final moments. Suddenly, news comes that the Fantastic Four have managed to defeat Galactus, saving the planet. In the wake of the team's victory, Sheldon promises he will spend more time with his family. However, he is later disgusted by the way the public has again turned on the Marvels, with Jameson, now the publisher of the Daily Bugle and Sheldon's most frequent employer, claiming that the Galactus threat was a hoax. Sheldon rages at a crowd carrying on an anti-mutant conversation.

=== "The Day She Died" ===
In the early 1970s, Sheldon publishes Marvels, which becomes an instant bestseller. He remains dismayed at the public's reaction to the Marvels and is disgusted by Jameson and his screeds against Spider-Man, who has been framed for the death of NYPD captain George Stacy. Sheldon resolves to investigate the murder and clear Spider-Man's name. While talking to a witness with Luke Cage, he learns that not only do the police believe Spider-Man is innocent, but that they suspect Otto Octavius to be the real killer. Sheldon interviews Octavius, but he refuses to confess to the murder. Sheldon then interviews Stacy's daughter Gwen and develops a friendship with her. Gwen's admiration and trust in the Marvels gives Sheldon a sudden insight: the purpose of the Marvels is to protect innocents like Gwen. On his way to meet her at the apartment of her boyfriend, Peter Parker, Sheldon witnesses Gwen's kidnapping by the Green Goblin. He follows the Goblin to the Brooklyn Bridge and a confrontation with Spider-Man. Watching their battle through a telephoto lens, Sheldon is certain that Spider-Man will defeat the villain and rescue Gwen. Instead, Gwen is knocked off the bridge and killed, and Sheldon's faith in the Marvels is shattered. He plans to retire, but before he can hang up his camera, he has his assistant take a final photo of himself, Doris, and a "nice, normal boy" — Danny Ketch, who, unbeknownst to Sheldon, will grow up to become the demonic hero Ghost Rider.

=== Epilogue ===
During Christmas time in the mid-1970s, Sheldon is with his daughters in Rockefeller Center when the Sentinels begin attacking. The X-Men, who were walking among the crowd, spring into action with Sheldon and his daughters left in awe at Banshee and Storm. After the Sentinels are defeated, the cops try to monitor the situation when Nova, who admits that he is new, appears to help with any civilian casualties. Beth and Jennie ask their father if what occurred was anything like his old job, to which he answers positively, adding: "It's scary. It's exciting. It's thrilling. All of it at once". Having relived the thrill and earning the gumption to write another article, he resists and takes his daughters back home for the night.

== Collected editions ==
In 1995, Marvels was compiled into a trade paperback that featured the Human Torch short story (2003 re-release ISBN 0-7851-0049-0). For the tenth anniversary in 2004 Marvel released a 400-page hardcover (ISBN 0-7851-1388-6). In 2008 the original was reprinted as a hardcover (ISBN 0-7851-2784-4) and softcover volume (by Panini Comics, ISBN 1-905239-97-1) and in 2012 as issue 15 of The Official Marvel Graphic Novel Collection as number 13.

== Awards ==
=== Awards won ===
- 1994 Eisner Award for Best Finite/Limited Series
- 1994 Eisner Award for Best Painter - awarded to Alex Ross
- 1994 Eisner Award for Best Publication Design - awarded Comicraft

=== Nominations ===
- 1994 Eisner Award for Best Cover Artist - awarded to Alex Ross
- 1994 Eisner Award for Best Single Issue - for Marvels #2 "Monsters"

== Sequels ==
Marvel later published similar limited series under the "Marvels" header, with other writers and painters, though none of these titles were as successful as the original. They were collected in the paperback Marvels Companion.

In 1995, Marvel released the darker Ruins by writer Warren Ellis and painters Cliff and Terese Nielsen, which was a two-issue parallel world series in which Phil Sheldon explored a Marvel universe that had gone terribly wrong.

The 1997 miniseries Code of Honor, written by Chuck Dixon and painted by Tristan Shane and Brad Parker, had a similar approach to Marvels, following a police officer whose job is affected by the superheroes and villains. Busiek declared he and Ross debated on doing a Marvels sequel, only for Ross to bail out not wanting to draw Wolverine and the Punisher, and once the writer himself left the project, Busiek refitted the intended plot on "The Dark Age" arc of his title Astro City.

In 2008, the long-planned direct sequel, the six-part limited series Marvels: Eye of the Camera, began. It returns to Sheldon's perspective, after his retirement. While Ross did not return for this sequel, Busiek returned as writer, with Roger Stern as co-writer for issues #3–6, with artwork by Jay Anacleto.

A new series titled The Marvels by Busiek debuted in April 2021.

== Related works ==
Phil Sheldon makes cameo appearances in the DC Comics miniseries Kingdom Come.

== In other media ==
=== Television ===
- Phil Sheldon makes a cameo appearance in The Super Hero Squad Show episode "This Al Dente Earth!", voiced by Charlie Adler.
- Maggie makes a cameo appearance in the X-Men '97 episode "A Force to Be Reckoned With".

=== Podcast ===
In late 2019, a radio drama podcast adaptation of Marvels was released, with the first season focusing on the aftermath of the Fantastic Four's battle with Galactus in New York City, New York, starring Clifford "Method Man" Smith as Ben Urich, AnnaSophia Robb as Marcia Hardesty, Ethan Peck as Reed Richards / Mister Fantastic, Seth Barrish as Phil Sheldon, Louisa Krause as Susan Storm / Invisible Woman, Jake Hart as Ben Grimm / The Thing, Ehad Berisha as Johnny Storm / Human Torch, Teo Rapp-Olsson as Peter Parker / Spider-Man, and Gabriela Ortega as Charlie Martinez. The adaptation was written by Lauren Shippen, directed by Paul Bae, with music by Evan Cunningham, and sound design by Mischa Stanton. Stanton was nominated for two 2020 Audio Verse Awards for their work on the podcast.

=== Video games ===
Phil Sheldon appears in Avengers (2020), voiced by Walt Gray. This version is a journalist.
