= Hokum & Hex =

Clive Barker comic book series

- Hokum & Hex #1 (Sept. 1993): cover art by Anthony Williams and Andy Lanning.

Publication information
- Publisher: Razorline (Marvel Comics)
- Schedule: Monthly
- Format: Ongoing series
- Genre: Superhero
- Publication date: January 1993 – May 1994
- No. of issues: 9

Creative team
- Created by: Clive Barker
- Written by: Frank Lovece
- Penciller: Anthony Williams
- Inker: Andy Lanning
- Letterer: John Costanza
- Colorist: Maria Parwulski
- Editor: Marcus McLaurin

Hokum & Hex is a superhero comic book series published by Marvel Comics' Razorline imprint that ran from 1993 to 1994. Created by filmmaker and horror/fantasy novelist Clive Barker as one of the imprint's four interconnected series, it starred Trip Monroe, a failing stand-up comedian who, through apparently random circumstances, is given powers in order to become Earth's protector against the fundamentalist warriors of an extradimensional god attempting to convert the planet.

== Publication history ==
Hokum & Hex was created by filmmaker and horror/fantasy novelist Clive Barker, written by Frank Lovece and penciled by Anthony Williams, with most issues inked by Andy Lanning. It ran nine issues (cover-dated Sept. 1993 – May 1994) before being discontinued with the rest of the Razorline titles. A subsequent one-shot, Hyperkind Unleashed #1 (cover-dated Sept. 1994, dated Aug. 1994 in indicia), featuring the Razorline's superhero team, included a "Hokum & Hex" prose short story by Lovece.

As Barker described, "I wanted to do something that was magical and mystical in the way that Doctor Strange was and still is. Doctor Strange was one of my favourite comics from when I was a kid. So I suppose Hokum & Hex is my take on that".

== Fictional character biography ==
Trip Monroe, a failing stand-up comedian who lives in his late grandfather's rent-controlled apartment in Times Square, New York City, is given powers through apparently random circumstances to become Earth's protector against the fundamentalist warriors of an extradimensional god attempting to convert the planet. Through the machinations of a fledgling god, Godkin Straith, Monroe is imbued with the ability to shape-shift inorganic objects, although the process, which depends on exactness of mind, does not always work as envisioned. Once, trying to change something into a club for defense, he found himself holding a large playing card club symbol (inadvertently, sharp-edged and ax-like).

Supporting characters included Gorkill Corpus, one of the extradimensional warriors, who are of the Corpii race; and Mona Lisa McDonagh, Trip's platonic best friend. Antagonists included the costumed but non-superpowered female bounty hunter Wrath; the monstrous In Extremis, one of the time-manipulating Tempus Magii; Z-Man, an aged, former 1950s superhero who had been a 1940s sidekick; and Bloodshed, the champion of Felon Bale, the god opposing Godkin Straith.

== Critical reception ==
Don Thompson in Comics Buyer's Guide found Hokum & Hex the best of the four Razorline titles. Calling it "a barrel of fun" and giving it the imprint's only "A" rating on scale of A to F, he added: "You've never seen a cliffhanger (like the one at the end of #1) resolved the way this one is in #2".

Cliff Biggers and Brett Brooks in Comic Shop News likewise said: "My favorite of the bunch is Hokum & Hex; this is a title that manages to capture the wit of the early issues of DC's Justice League America title without sacrificing a sharp action edge. ... Anthony Williams' art is lightly cartoonish and heavily adventureish; superhero fans won't be at all disappointed with the blend".
