= Hyperkind =

Comic book series

Publication information
- Publisher: Razorline (Marvel Comics)
- Schedule: Monthly
- Format: Ongoing series
- Genre: Superhero
- Publication date: Sept. 1993 - May 1994
- No. of issues: 9

Creative team
- Created by: Clive Barker
- Written by: Fred Burke
- Penciller: Paris Cullins
- Inker: Bob Petrecca
- Letterer: Steve Dutro
- Colorist: Tom Smith
- Editor: Marcus McLaurin

Hyperkind is a superhero comic book series published by Marvel Comics' Razorline imprint that ran from 1993 to 1994. Created by filmmaker and horror/fantasy novelist Clive Barker as one of the imprint's four interconnected series, it starred a team of four young adults whose superpowers represent aspects of human consciousness. Its characters exist in one of the many alternate universes outside the mainstream continuity known as the Marvel Universe.

== Publication history ==
Created by Clive Barker, the series was written by Fred Burke, penciled by Paris Cullins and inked by Bob Petrecca. Hyperkind ran nine issues (cover-dated Sept. 1993 - May 1994). A 48-page one-shot, Hyperkind: Unleashed (cover-dated Sept. 1994, dated Aug. 1994 in indicia), also contained a prose short story by Frank Lovece, starring characters from his Razorline series Hokum & Hex.

While describing the Razorline imprint Barker said of the series: "I wanted to do a super hero comic, something which would be my take on what super heroes were going to be like in the '90s... Hyperkind fell into that category".

== Fictional character biographies ==
The human quartet making up the Hyperkind comprises the next generation of an earlier, mysteriously forgotten team, the Paxis. The four superheroes, and their enhanced-canine member, are:

- Amokk (George Yoneda): Able to turn into a super-strong, blade-handed bestial creature, in this form he is unable to do anything that requires fingers and tends to be very aggressive.
- Armata (Lisa Moffitt): Able to summon armor that produces various weapons and jets for flight. Powered by her life force, excessive use of her powers can cause a state of torpor or even death. Being returned to her chamber can rejuvenate her.
- Bliss ("Dyan Divine", real name unknown): Able to make illusions real and read the dreams of others. Bliss was abused by her father and suffers some emotional problems.
- Logix (Kenny Zambetti): Able to enter and control computers and predict probabilities with his machine-like mind. The downside of his power is that he begins to suffer emotional detachment from everything.
- Ecka is a dog who finds the last of the power chambers, and gains what the others call "cosmic consciousness".
