= Marcus McLaurin =

American comic-book writer and editor

- Areas: Writer, editor, colorist, designer, illustrator

Marcus McLaurin is an American comic-book writer and editor known for developing and editing the influential Marvel Comics series Marvels.

== Biography ==
Marc McLaurin studied art at Pratt Institute in Brooklyn, New York, where he and his roommate Richard Rice founded the Comics Illustrators Guild, later renamed Static Fish Comic Club. They produced a student-run comic anthology once per semester, with comics from them and other students. Getting his BFA in Communications Design(Illustration). He got an Internship at Marvel in 1986 as an assistant editor. He rose to become a full editor working on the Epic Comics imprint and on other Marvel projects. These included Epic's various Alien Legion limited series, its "Heavy Hitters" line of action comics by Peter David, Howard Chaykin and others, and licensed titles such as the manga Akira and filmmaker and fantasy novelist Clive Barker's Nightbreed and Hellraiser. He also edited the Razorline imprint of superheroes created by Barker for Marvel.

As a writer, McLaurin penned the entire 20-issue run of the Luke Cage revival series Cage (1992–1993). He also wrote issues of The Punisher (1987–1995 series) and occasional features in Marvel Comics Presents.

== Selected bibliography ==
=== Editor ===
- Alpha Flight #80–82 (Marvel Comics, January 1990 – March 1990)
- A Shadowline Saga: Critical Mass #2–4 (Marvel Comics [Epic], February 1990 – April 1990)
- Captain America Goes to War Against Drugs #1 (Marvel Comics, 1990)
- Epic Graphic Novel: Hearts and Minds #1 (Marvel Comics [Epic], 1990) – (one-shot)
- Akira #26–27 (Marvel Comics, 1990–1991)
- Clive Barker's Hellraiser #4–19 (Marvel Comics [Epic], 1990–1992)
- Tomorrow Knights #2 (Marvel Comics [Epic], July 1990)
- Tales from the Heart of Africa: The Temporary Natives #2 (Marvel Comics [Epic], August 1990) – (one-shot)
- Sergio Aragonés Groo the Wanderer #69–96 (Marvel Comics, September 1990 – December 1992)
- Ted McKeever's Metropol #1–12 (Marvel Comics [Epic], March 1991 – March 1992)
- Clive Barker's Book of the Damned: A Hellraiser Companion #1–2 (Marvel Comics [Epic], October 1991 – April 1992)
- Clive Barker's Hellraiser Summer Special #1 (Marvel Comics [Epic], 1992) – (one-shot)
- 67 Seconds (Marvel Comics [Epic], 1992) – (one-shot)
- Bloodlines: A Tale from the Heart of Africa #1 (Marvel Comics [Epic], 1992) – (one-shot)
- Hellraiser III: Hell on Earth Movie Special #1 (Marvel Comics [Epic], 1992) – (one-shot)
- Idol #1–3 (Marvel Comics [Epic], 1992–1992)
- Terror Inc. #1–13 (Marvel Comics, July 1992 – July 1993)
- Hokum & Hex #1–9 (Marvel Comics [Razorline], September 1993 – May 1994)
- Razorline: The First Cut #1 (Marvel Comics [Razorline], September 1993) – (one-shot)
- Clive Barker's The Harrowers #1–2 (Marvel Comics [Razorline], December 1993 – January 1994)
- Hyperkind #1-8 (Marvel Comics [Razorline], December 1993)
- Saint Sinner #1-8 (Marvel Comics [Razorline], September 1993- May 1994)
- Marvels #1–4 (Marvel Comics, January 1994 – April 1994)
- Ectokid #1-8 (Marvel Comics [Razorline], April 1994)
- Hyperkind #1–9 (Marvel Comics [Razorline], April 1994 – May 1994)
- Marvels #0 (Marvel Comics, August 1994)
- Tales of Suspense (vol. 2) #1 (Marvel Comics, January 1995) – (one-shot)
- What If? (vol. 2) #73–84 (Marvel Comics, May 1995 – April 1996)
- Marvels: Portraits #1-4 (Marvel Comics, June 1995)

=== Assistant Editor ===
- Official Handbook of the Marvel Universe (vol. 2) #13–16 (Marvel Comics, December 1986 – June 1987)
- The Punisher (vol. 2) #4–5 (Marvel Comics, November 1987 – January 1988)
- Alpha Flight #58 (Marvel Comics, May 1988)
- Alpha Flight #60–62 (Marvel Comics, July 1988 – September 1988)
- Alpha Flight #64 (Marvel Comics, November 1988)
- The Mutant Misadventures of Cloak and Dagger #2 (Marvel Comics, December 1988)
- Alpha Flight #66–67 (Marvel Comics, January 1989 – February 1989)
- Alpha Flight #69 (Marvel Comics, April 1989)
- Alpha Flight #71–78 (Marvel Comics, June 1989 – December 1989)
- Shadowmasters #1–2 (Marvel Comics, October 1989 – November 1989)

=== Penciller ===
- Official Handbook of the Marvel Universe (vol. 2) #17 (Marvel Comics, August 1987) – (Doctor Sun entry)
- Alpha Flight #69 (Marvel Comics, April 1989)
- "Psycho Killer." Justice #30 (Marvel Comics, April 1989)

=== Writer ===
- "In the Dark." Marvel Comics Presents #9 (Marvel Comics, December 1988) – (Cloak story)
- "The First Cut." Marvel Comics Presents #21 (Marvel Comics, June 1989) – (Thing story)
- "The Vault." Clive Barker's Hellraiser #2 (Marvel Comics [Epic], 1990)
- "Object." Marvel Comics Presents #48 (Marvel Comics, April 1990) – (Wasp story)
- "Awful Flight." What The--?! #7 (Marvel Comics, April 1990)
- "The Real Thing." Marvel Comics Presents #59 (Marvel Comics, September 1990) – (Punisher story)
- "Vampires!" Marvel Comics Presents #64 (Marvel Comics, December 1990) – (Blade story)
- Marvel Comics Presents #82–87 (Marvel Comics, July 1991 – October 1991) – (Firestar story) (co-writer)
- "Hero in Hiding." Marvel Comics Presents #82 (Marvel Comics, July 1991) – (Luke Cage story)
- "Bark Like a Dog." The Punisher (vol. 2) #50 (Marvel Comics, July 1991)
- The Punisher (vol. 2) #60–62 (Marvel Comics, February 1992 – April 1992)
- Cage #1–20 (Marvel Comics, April 1992 – November 1993)
- Spider-Man Unlimited #6 (Marvel Comics, August 1994)
- What If? (vol. 2) #93 (Marvel Comics, January 1997) – (Wolverine story)

=== Colorist ===
- "The First Cut." Marvel Comics Presents #21 (Marvel Comics, June 1989) – (Thing story)
- "Past and Present Sins." Marvel Comics Presents #34 (Marvel Comics, December 1989) – (Captain America story)
- "Object." Marvel Comics Presents #48 (Marvel Comics, April 1990) – (Wasp story)
- Web of Spider-Man #66 (Marvel Comics, July 1990) – (co-colorist)
- "The Real Thing." Marvel Comics Presents #59 (Marvel Comics, September 1990) – (Punisher story)
- "One into Three Won't Go!" Marvel Comics Presents #70 (Marvel Comics, February 1991) – (Black Widow/Darkstar/Starlight story)
- Marvel Comics Presents #82–87 (Marvel Comics, July 1991 – October 1991) – (Firestar story)
- "Hero in Hiding." Marvel Comics Presents #82 (Marvel Comics, July 1991) – (Luke Cage story)
- Epic Lite #1 (Marvel Comics [Epic], September 1991) – (co-colorist)

=== Letterer ===
- Strikeforce: Morituri Electric Undertow #1–5 (Marvel Comics, December 1989 – March 1990) – (co-designer)
