= Razorline =

Comic book publisher

- Industry: Publishing
- Genre: Superhero
- Founded: 1993 (launch)
- Founder: Clive Barker
- Key people: Clive Barker (creator); Marcus McLaurin (editor)
- Products: Comics
- Owner: Marvel Entertainment, LLC (The Walt Disney Company)
- Parent: Marvel Comics

Razorline was an imprint of American comic book company Marvel Comics that ran from 1993 to 1995. It was created by filmmaker and horror/fantasy novelist Clive Barker, with its characters existing in one of the many alternate universes outside the mainstream continuity known as the Marvel Universe.

== Publication history ==
Hokum & Hex #1 (Sept. 1993), cover art by Anthony Williams & Andy Lanning.

The Razorline imprint consisted of four interrelated titles, based on Barker's detailed premises, titles and lead characters. These were:

- Ectokid – written first by James Robinson, then by Lana Wachowski, and pencilled by Steve Skroce
- Hokum & Hex – written by Frank Lovece, penciled by Anthony Williams
- Hyperkind – written by Fred Burke, pencilled by Paris Cullins and inked by Bob Petrecca
- Saint Sinner – written by Elaine Lee, pencilled and inked by Max Douglas

Marcus McLaurin was the editor. The four titles were preceded by a one-shot sampler cover-titled: Razorline: First Cut.

As Barker described:

I wanted to do a superhero comic, something which would be my take on what superheroes were going to be like in the '90s... Hyperkind fell into that category. I wanted to do something that was magical and mystical in the way that Doctor Strange was and still is. Doctor Strange was one of my favourite comics from when I was a kid. So I suppose Hokum & Hex is my take on that. Ectokid, which is perhaps the second weirdest of the bunch, is a kind of dream story for the 15-year-old that's still alive to me — the tale of an adolescent who lives in two worlds and has access to a whole other sphere of reality. And Saint Sinner is just a wild one, the series which hopefully will press the limits of what comics can do.

Razorline was launched in 1993 as several other publishers, including Malibu Comics, Defiant Comics, and Dark Horse Comics, were launching superhero lines. There was a second wave of titles that were written and in at least some instances penciled but were not released. Comics historians Keith Dallas and Jason Sacks analyzed that "by the summer of 1993 the market was so oversaturated with new titles and new universes, there was no room for imprints as unique as the Barkerverse to stand out".

In 2005, the appendix page of the Official Handbook of the Marvel Universe one-shot involving alternate universes revealed that the Earth of the Razorline imprint is designated as Earth-45828. Relatively real-world, without other superheroes, it includes Marvel Comics as a comic-book publisher, with Razorline characters making references to "X-Men comics" and to Marvel editor Stan Lee's Fantastic Four writing.

Hokum & Hex and Hyperkind were superhero series, while the other two were supernatural series. All were released with a Comics Code seal. The Razorline's short run of seven to nine issues each was due in large part to market conditions.

Two one-shots followed: Hyperkind Unleashed (which included a "Hokum & Hex" prose short story) and Ektokid Unleashed (which included a "Saint Sinner" prose short story).

== Other titles ==
In total, 10 comic lines were planned. Before the cancellations, several issues of four subsequent series were in various stages of completion: Wraitheart (written by Frank Lovece, art by Hector Gomez), Schizm (written by Fred Burke), Mode Extreme (written by Sarah Byam), and Fusion Force.

Columnist and former comics publisher Catherine Yronwode wrote:

Several issues of each of the Marvel-Barker titles have been fully scripted and illustrated, and Marvel still retains the rights to publish them if and when the market takes an upturn. And make no mistake, it is the current state of the comic book market, not any problems with Clive or his popularity that caused Marvel to stop work on the three Barker titles. In fact, it seems that the decision to shelve these books was based on the fact that Marvel's recent new launches have not been as successful as hoped. Hulk 2099 was cancelled with issue six, and two other titles went directly from open-ended to four-issue miniseries, when sales reports on the first issues came in.

== In other media ==
A 2002 Barker telefilm titled Saint Sinner bore no relation to the comic. In Barker's words: "I was always disappointed with the way that Marvel handled that entire line of comics, particularly Saint Sinner. I thought that's a waste of a good title. It was something that called for finding a new life in some way or another".

== See also ==
- Shadowline, an earlier attempt at a Marvel horrorverse.
- Marvel Comics multiverse
