= Shadowline (Epic Comics) =

Marvel Comics imprint

Shadowline is an American comic book sub-imprint of the Marvel Comics imprint Epic Comics that was originally published from 1988 to 1990. It was created and edited by Archie Goodwin and encompassed three series. Informally called the Shadowline Saga, it was Marvel's first attempt at a mature audience line of superhero comics, and the first by Epic Comics to utilize a planned shared universe.

== Fictional universe ==
The Shadow Dwellers, a race similar to human, evolved more rapidly and with superior abilities compared to humans, while humans dominated numerically. Upon maturity, Shadow Dwellers' aging stopped until they reproduced. This provided a natural balance, preventing their potential immortality from leading to overpopulation. Because of humans' greater number, this other race lived as a shadow race among humans, sometimes as protectors, sometimes as predators, and over the centuries becoming the basis of many human legends myths, both heroic and supernaturally monstrous. By the late 20th century, it had become near-impossible to continue living in secret, both because of the proliferation of humanity and its technology and temperament. The Shadow Dwellers felt it had become necessary to emerge and to influence humanity. Scattered worldwide, with differing ideas and motivations, the Shadow Dwellers included, among the most public, Doctor Zero, Powerline, and the Order of St. George. The Shadowline Saga stories were set in a shared universe within the Marvel Comics multiverse which was retroactively designated Earth-88194.

=== Original line ===
- Doctor Zero (created by Archie Goodwin, 8 issues): The most ancient and powerful of the Shadow Dwellers manipulates humanity in Machiavellian fashion.
- Power Line (created by Archie Goodwin, 8 issues): A pair of Shadows work together with the goal of balancing Dr. Zero's manipulations with acts of heroism.
- St. George (created by Archie Goodwin, 8 issues): The Knight of The Order of St. George, a human priest with Shadow-designed armor created to prepare its wearer for battles against today's dragons.

== Second era ==
Doctor Zero, Power Line, and St. George #9–13 were supposed to be part of The Shadowline Saga "Critical Mass" crossover. Due to poor sales, Epic cancelled the three Shadowline series and published the story in an anthology format as the Critical Mass limited series.

- Critical Mass (created by D. G. Chichester and Margaret Clark, seven issues):

The abilities of Doctor Zero, Power Line, and St. George have been called upon to put an end to the insane plans of Professor Henry Clerk, a physicist ready to set loose the dark forces of nuclear power on the heartland of America. There are, however, two things remaining before they can match their power against Clerk's: first, Powerline must come to the aid of Michael Devlin, the Knight of the Order, in his race to reforge his shattered armor; and then, Devlin must struggle to redirect Doctor Zero's blood rage to bear on Clerk, as the modern day St. George battles against Zero, an impossibly powerful dragon.

== Other versions ==
Alternate reality versions of Doctor Zero and St. George appear in the first issue of Squadron Sinister as a part of the Marvel Secret Wars event.

== See also ==
- Terror Inc.
- Razorline, a later Marvel attempt at a horrorverse
- Marvel Comics Multiverse
