= Saint Sinner (comics) =

Comic book series published by Marvel Comics

- Saint Sinner #1 (Oct. 1993), cover art by Max Douglas.

Publication information
- Publisher: Marvel Comics
- Schedule: Monthly
- Genre: Superhero, horror
- Publication date: October 1993 - April 1994
- No. of issues: 7
- Main character: Philip Fetter

Creative team
- Created by: Clive Barker
- Written by: Elaine Lee
- Artist: Max Douglas
- Penciller(s): Richard Pace; Larry Brown
- Inker(s): Max Douglas; Rick Bryant; Gabriel Morrissette
- Letterer: Janice Chiang
- Colorist(s): Christie Scheele; Maria Parwulski
- Editor: Marcus McLaurin

Saint Sinner is a superhero horror comic book series published by Marvel Comics' Razorline imprint that ran from 1993 to 1994. Created by filmmaker and horror/fantasy novelist Clive Barker as one of the imprint's four interconnected series, it starred Philip Fetter, a man possessed by both a demon and an angel.

Aside from the title, it is unrelated to the Barker-produced telefilm Saint Sinner.

== Publication history ==
Created by filmmaker and horror/fantasy novelist Clive Barker, Saint Sinner was published for seven issues (cover-dated Oct. 1993 - April 1994). Written by Elaine Lee, it was drawn by Max Douglas for the first four issues. Richard Pace penciled issue #5, with inks by Douglas. Larry Brown drew the final two issues.

Lee also wrote a Saint Sinner prose short story in the final release of the Razorline imprint, Ectokid Unleashed (Oct. 1994), a 48-page one-shot starring the title character of another Razorline comic.

Clive Barker called Saint Sinner "just a wild one, the series which hopefully will press the limits of what comics can do".

== Fictional character biography ==
Saint Sinner centered on Philip Fetter, a man possessed by both a demon and an angel. With the ability to evolve or regress anyone from superhuman to primal beast, Fetter travels the world changing lives.
