= Mark Badger =

American illustrator

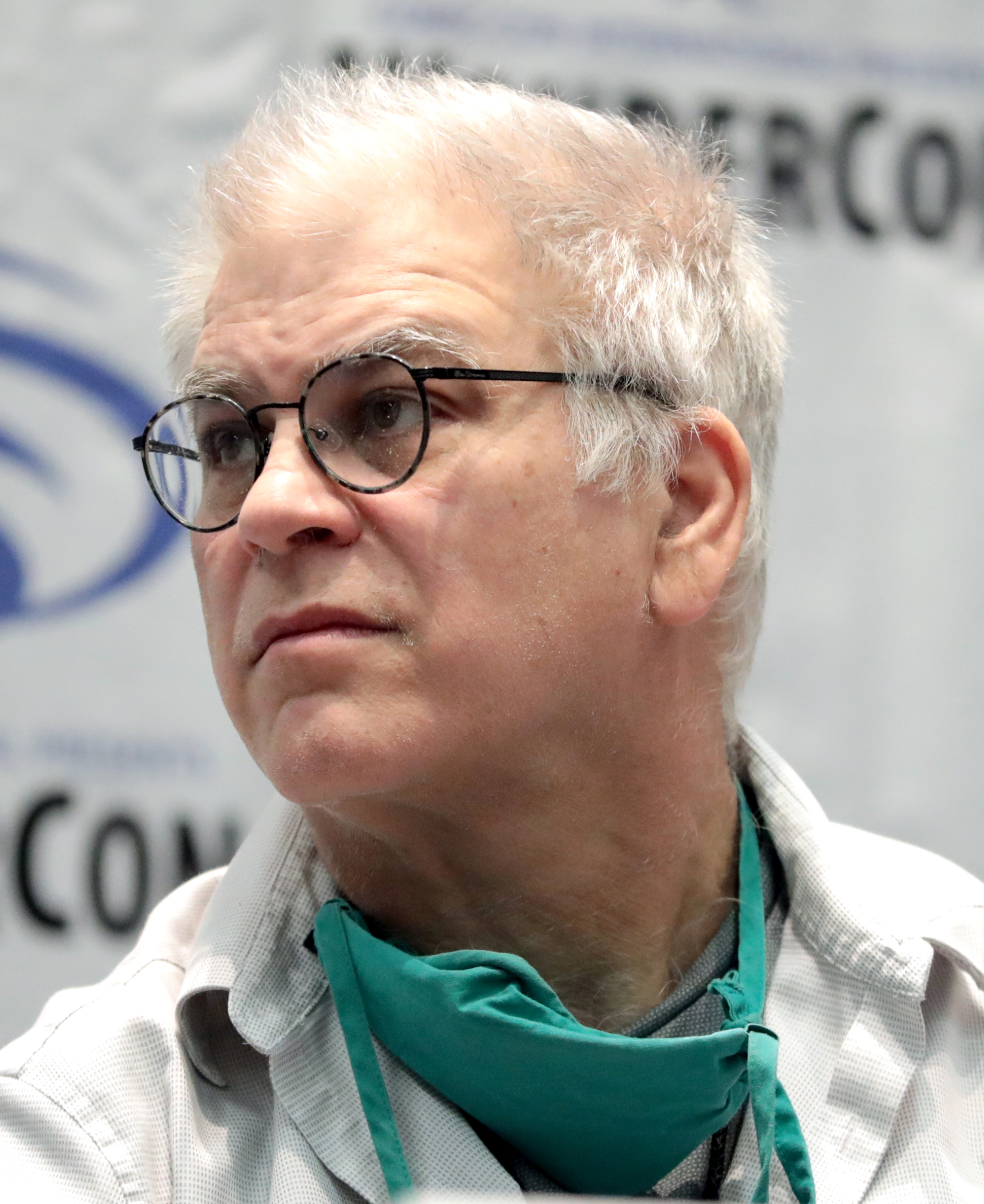
Mark Badger at the 2023 WonderCon.

Mark Billings Badger (October 16, 1958), known as Mark Badger, is an American illustrator who has worked as a penciler, inker, cover artist, painter, and occasional colorist in the American comic book industry. In addition to his career as a comic book artist, Badger is a political activist and organizer, often mixing the comic book medium with activism. As an early adapter of digital tools to create comic art, Badger has taken to create web-based comics for the purposes of education and activism. Under these auspices, he is in collaboration with the Bayard Rustin Center for Social Justice to establish an online platform to produce a series of web comix with other authors and artists to preserve the life and legacy of heretofore unrecognized queer civil rights pioneer Bayard Rustin. Badger also teaches "Programming, comic books, and web development" at San Francisco’s Academy of Art University. Badger, a native of Cleveland, was diagnosed with multiple sclerosis at age thirty. He lives in Oakland, California.

== Work ==
Mark Badger’s first professional work for corporate-level comics was coloring an 8-page story entitled "Last Chance" in The Alien Legion #3 (August, 1984) for Epic Comics, an imprint of Marvel. His cover for The Incredible Hulk #303 (January 1985) the following year marked his debut as a cover artist. Following The Incredible Hulk #303, he penciled the cover for The New Defenders #140 (published February 1985, but drawn in 1984) with inks by Kevin Nowlan (under the pseudonym Larry Mundelo). Building up to full artistic duties on a book, Badger is credited for the layout work in Power Pack #8 (March 1985).

Badger's first major work as both the penciler and inker was in the four-issue limited series, The Gargoyle (June–September 1985). Issue #4 was the only cover he created for the series. Badger also contributed a Gargoyle pinup to The Official Handbook of the Marvel Universe Deluxe Edition #5 (April 1986), which was also his last published work for Marvel for this time. The Gargoyle is significant in that it marks the beginning of frequent collaborations with writer J.M. DeMatteis.

During the release of The Gargoyle mini-series, Mark Badger collaborated on other titles. He penciled the cover of The New Defenders #145 (drawn in January 1984 with a cover date of July 1985, inks by Terry Austin), was the cover artist for Doctor Strange #72 (August 1985), as well as for Doctor Strange #74 (December 1985). In Doctor Strange #75 (February 1986), Badger finished Sal Buscema’s layouts, but did the breakdowns for Doctor Strange #76.

The last major work Mark Badger did for Marvel Comics in this early period was painted artwork for Greenberg the Vampire (Marvel Graphic Novel #20, 1986) based on a script by J.M. DeMatteis. With the exception of Greenberg and the Marvel Universe Handbook, all of Mark Badger’s work was under the editorial direction of Carl Potts.

Other notable works include Doctor Strange, Excalibur, Gargoyle, Power Pack for Marvel Comics, Batman: Legends of the Dark Knight: Jazz, Batman: Run, Riddler, Run, Martian Manhunter, The Spectre, and The Shadow Strikes for DC Comics, The Masque (The earlier version of The Mask) for Dark Horse Presents, American Flagg! for First Comics, and The Score for Piranha Press.

Mark Badger's independent works include Instant Piano, Urban Empathy, Carabella on the Run, Abstract Kirby, and Julius Caesar.
