= Frank Cirocco =

American comics artist and video game designer

- Born: Frank Cirocco; June 13, 1956 (age 70)
- Areas: Writer, Penciller, Inker, Colourist
- Notable works: Alien Legion

Frank Cirocco (born June 13, 1956) is an American comics artist and video game designer best known as the co-creator of Alien Legion with Carl Potts and Alan Zelenetz.

== Early life ==
Frank Cirocco moved from Elmwood Park, New Jersey to San Jose, California with his family in 1961. He attended Branham High School and San Jose State College in the 1970s.

== Career ==
In the mid-1970s, Cirocco was an artist/publisher of the noted fanzine, Venture. Neal Adams was commissioned to do the cover of issue #5 in 1975. Cirocco had first met Adams in 1973, at San Diego Comic-Con where he, Brent Anderson, and Gary Winnick commissioned a number of sketches that were later printed in Venture magazine. By 1976, Frank Cirocco began his career in the comics industry as a member of the Crusty Bunkers at Neal Adams' Continuity Studios. His first professional assignments were a three-page Twilight Zone story for Gold Key Comics and some spot illustrations for Marvel Comics' Doc Savage magazine.

He returned to California and started a commercial art studio called Horizon Zero Graphiques with partner Gary Winnick in 1977. He continued working commercially, mostly for video game companies, for the next several years. In 1983, Cirocco, Carl Potts and Alan Zelenetz co-created the series Alien Legion, conceived as "the French Foreign Legion in space." Two ongoing series and several miniseries and one-shots were produced. In 2007, Potts' Alien Legion screenplay was optioned by producer Jerry Bruckheimer and The Walt Disney Company. Bruckheimer exercised the option and bought the script in 2010, hiring Game of Thrones show runner David Benioff to do a rewrite.

Cirocco drew several covers for other Marvel titles including The Defenders, Doctor Strange, The Incredible Hulk, Amazing High Adventure, Shadowmasters (with Jim Lee), and more. In 1992, he worked on a comic book adaptation of the LucasArts Defenders of Dynatron City video game, followed by a Samurai Cat mini-series for Marvel, adapting the character from a series of books by Mark Rogers. Cirocco reunited with Gary Winnick in 1996 to form Lightsource Studios, a content development studio, which operated until 2012. Cirocco and his wife Lela Dowling created Skyland Gallery in April 2010, which focused on art celebrating nature. He has continued to do mainly commercial work throughout his entire career, but in 2020, Cirocco returned to comics once again and teamed with fellow artist Alex Sheikman to illustrate a six-issue mini series titled Becoming Frankenstein for Ten Ton Press.

== Personal life ==
Cirocco is married to fellow artist Lela Dowling. He first met Dowling in 1977, the year he started Horizon Zero Graphiques. Friends for decades, they married over 30 years later, in 2008. The couple resides in the Santa Cruz Mountains with their Formosan Mountain Dog, Pepper.

== Bibliography ==
Interior art unless noted.

Atari

- Yars' Revenge (1982)

Bittersweet Press

- Psychozort #1 (1998)

DC Comics

- Batman: Legends of the Dark Knight #112 (1998)

Dragon's Teeth

- Dragon's Teeth #1 (1983)
- The Final Cycle: Part 1 #1–3 (1987)

Gold Key Comics

- The Twilight Zone #67 (1975)

Horizon Zero Graphiques

- Venture #5 (1976)

Marvel Comics

- Alien Legion #1–6 (interior art); #7–20 (covers only) (1984–1987)
- Alien Legion vol. 2 #1–18 (covers only) (1987–1990)
- Amazing High Adventure #3 (cover only) (1986)
- The Defenders #130, 136, 146–147, 150, 152 (covers only) (1984–1986)
- Defenders of Dynatron City #1–6 (1992)
- Doctor Strange vol. 2 #61 (cover only) (1983)
- The Incredible Hulk vol. 2 #299 (cover only) (1984)
- Marvel Graphic Novel: The Alien Legion – A Grey Day to Die SC (1987)
- Samurai Cat #1–3 (1991)
- Savage Sword of Conan #11 (1976)
- Strikeforce: Morituri Electric Undertow #1–5 (covers only) (1989–1990)

Phi Publishing

- International Insanity #v2#1, #v2#2 (1977)

SJ Graphics

- The Heroines Showcase Art Portfolio #3 (1985)

Slave Labor

- Neomen #1–2 (1987–1988)
- Suburban High Life #1–3 (1987)

Star*Reach

- Imagine #1 (1978)

Stories, Layouts & Press, Inc.

- Gasm #3 (1978)

TSR

- Buck Rogers Comics Module #1 (1990)

Savage Graphics

- ShadowStar (cover art only) #1 (1985)

Preceded by n/a	Alien Legion artist 1984–1985	Succeeded by Chris Warner
