= Atomic Age (comics) =

- Atomic Age #1 (Nov. 1990): Cover art by Mike Okamoto & Kevin Nowlan.

Publication information
- Publisher: Marvel Comics/Epic Comics
- Format: Science fiction
- Publication date: 1990–1991
- No. of issues: 4

Creative team
- Created by: Frank Lovece and Mike Okamoto
- Written by: Frank Lovece
- Penciller: Mike Okamato
- Inker: Al Williamson
- Colorist(s): Steve Oliff/OliOptics; John Wellington; Christie Scheele
- Editor: Marcus McLaurin

Atomic Age is an American science fiction four-issue comic book miniseries, cover-dated November 1990 to February 1991, published by the Marvel Comics creator-owned imprint Epic Comics. It was created by writer Frank Lovece and penciler Mike Okamoto, and inked by Al Williamson.

The series was among the items featured in the Bowling Green State University exhibition "The Atomic Age Opens: Selections from the Popular Culture Library". Collaborator Al Williamson won the 1991 Eisner Award for Best Inker for his work on it and other series that awards-year, with Okamoto winning the Russ Manning Award for most promising newcomer.

== Synopsis ==
Set in October 1957, immediately upon release of the Soviet artificial satellite Sputnik, Atomic Age is an ensemble seriocomedy of individuals affected by the first confirmed contact of humans and extraterrestrials. The principal cast is: Joe Nuñez, a put-upon, twentysomething Hispanic stringer for the Los Angeles Eagle newspaper in California; his beautiful, blond girlfriend, Nan Stoddard, an ambitious and restless young woman whose feelings for him may be genuine or an attempt at being transgressive through interracial dating in that pre-civil rights movement era; U.S. Army Col. John Patrick Lear, a proud yet pathetic figure who at the end of his career has been relegated to commanding the backwater Pacific Ocean military base Charity Island; and Nimbus, a mysterious alien who has arrived on Earth confused of his origins, but programmed to find and kill members of a genetically engineered slave race from his planet. The slaves, called drones, hope to commit species suicide — what the story calls "geneticide" — by destroying the scattered pieces of the original split of the drone race's "mother cell".

Nuñez, frequently beset by racial prejudice, has developed a rueful humor and a resentful hyper-ambition as a journalist. Using his connection with Nan's father, Dr. Stoddard, the head of a U.S. government observatory in Los Angeles, Nuñez meets clandestinely with a scientist who has classified data on what he believes is alien first contact; near retirement and stung by the Joseph McCarthy Red Scare hearings of a few years earlier, he sympathizes with Nuñez's desire to verify this important event despite government stonewalling. Nuñez makes his way to Charity Island, where Lear, bitter over what he considers unfair treatment by the military after his long but undistinguished career, warily joins forces with Nuñez to spin the presence of Nimbus — who was first seen over Charity Island and has left a dead drone there — in both men's favor.

Nuñez returns with Lear to California, where the observatory has tracked Nimbus. Nuñez's ambitions soon affect his relationship with Nan and her family, and though he questions how far he will compromise himself, he rationalizes that the racial prejudice against him requires moral corner-cutting to overcome. Lear's increasing desperation to prove himself not a failure leads to extremes that eventually threaten Nuñez while also forging a bond between Nuñez and Dr. Stoddard. Nimbus, who has uncovered a second, female drone, gradually learns of his true nature, and fulfills his mission in an unintended manner that betrays the billions of slaves on his world.

Counterpointing these personal stories are the fads, clothing, architecture, pop-culture imagery and prevailing social attitudes of the late 1950s, which inform the characters' actions and expectations.

== Production ==
The creators spoke of the series' authenticity in a 1990 interview, with Lovece saying: "Every car, for example, is a real car. We have a drag race in one of the issues, and the cars are a '56 Dodge and a '57 Chevy". Okamoto said of a scene involving a motorcycle: "We were going to put a Harley in the book, but ... kids back then couldn't afford a motorcycle as expensive as that, so most of them used Indian [brand] bikes".

A rudimentary early version of Atomic Age, set in the present day, appeared as an eight-page initial chapter by Lovece, penciller Robb Phipps and inker Sam de la Rosa in the comics magazine Woweekazowie #4 (Fall/Winter 1978).

A digital 30th-anniversary edition was published by Apex Comics in 2019.

== Reception ==
Nuclear Texts & Contexts #6 (Spring 1991) wrote: "Atomic Age (Frank Lovece, writer, & Mike Okamoto, artist, Epic Comics) is a four-part series dealing with alien invaders set during the Sputnik era. ... Although no nuclear war is featured, there is plenty of wry satire on Cold War paranoia, and on racism". Reviewer Paul Carbonero in Amazing Heroes found it "a pretty worthwhile series encompassing thoughtful writing and attractive art. ... Writer Frank Lovece should be commended for striving to make every one of his characters highly distinct from one another. ... Okamoto creates an effective '50s feel".

== Awards and distinctions ==
Atomic Age was among the items featured in the Bowling Green State University exhibition "The Atomic Age Opens: Selections from the Popular Culture Library".

Al Williamson won the 1991 Eisner Award for Best Inker for his work on this and other series that awards-year. For his painted work on Innovation's five-issue adaptation of the Piers Anthony novel On a Pale Horse in 1991, Okamoto won the Russ Manning Most Promising Newcomer Award.

== See also ==
- Atomic Age
