= Carl Potts =

Writer, artist, editor, teacher

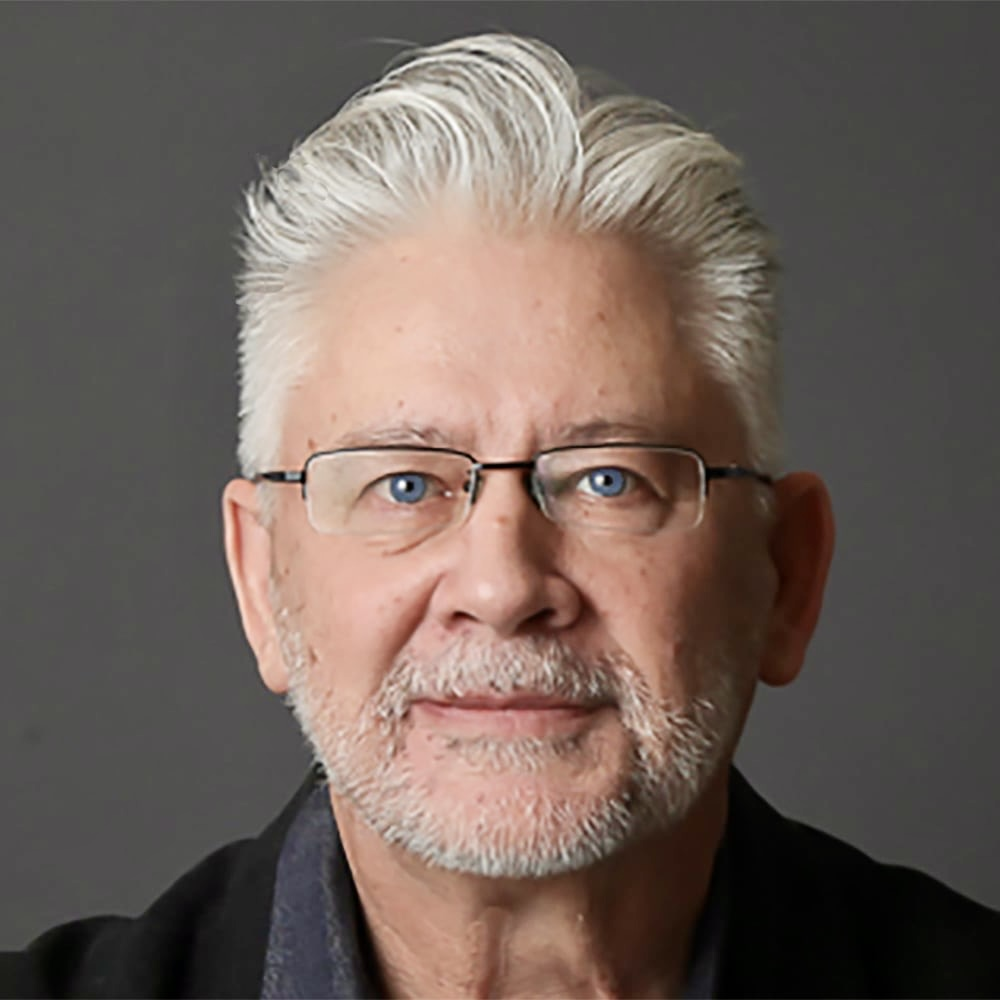
- Potts in 2024
- Born: November 12, 1952 (age 74) Oakland, California, US
- Areas: Writer, Penciller, Inker, Editor
- Notable works: Alien Legion; Epic Comics; The Punisher War Journal

Carl Potts (born November 12, 1952) is an American comics artist, writer, teacher, and editor best known for creating the series Alien Legion for the Marvel Comics imprint Epic Comics.

== Early life ==
Born in Oakland, California, Carl Potts was raised in the San Francisco Bay Area and in Hawaii. As he said in an interview: "I was a Navy brat. I was born in Oak Knoll Naval hospital in the Oakland Hills, and lived in various places around the East Bay Area until I was four, I believe it was. And my dad was stationed on Oahu and Honolulu, and so we live for two and a half years in Navy housing and Honolulu." His heritage is Asian and Caucasian: "My father and my mother met shortly after World War II in the Bay Area. My mother and her whole family had been prisoners of the Japanese in the Philippines during the war for over three years. And even though my maternal grandmother, her mother was Japanese, born and raised, she had married an American, and considered herself an American from that point on. So they were in the Philippines when the Japanese took over and they took all of the allied civilians and put them in prison camps. The biggest one was Santa Tomas University campus, this big square city block with big walls around it that was in the heart of Manila."

Potts received an associate degree in commercial art from Chabot College in Hayward, California. He received his bachelor's degree from SUNY – Empire State College, in creative writing and editing.

== Career ==
After contributing to such comics fanzines as the anthology Venture, Potts drew backgrounds and some secondary figures for a late fill-in issue of DC Comics' Richard Dragon: Kung Fu Fighter, being drawn by Bay Area comics artists Jim Starlin and Alan Weiss. Potts began his comics career in 1975. As he remembered:

"When I told Starlin I was going to move to New York, he asked me if I knew anybody out there. And I said, 'No, I did not.' And he said, 'Hmm, I’m going to make a call.' So he ended up calling Al Milgrom and Walt Simonson who shared an apartment in Forest Hills, Queens, and said, you know, 'If this kid comes out there, would you guys be willing to put him up while he gets his feet under him?' They said, 'Sure.' They’d never met me. They had no idea who I was. They just took Starlin’s word that I was decent folk." Living in the same building were Bernie Wrightson and Howard Chaykin, "and they’re always paling around all day long."

His first professional comics work was art for a subscription ad for Marvel's black-and-white magazine Unknown Worlds of Science Fiction. "So my second day in New York, [Jim Starlin] took me up to the Marvel offices, which were the ones on Madison Avenue at that point, and introduced me around, and I got to show my work. And sold my first piece to Archie Goodwin of all people, who was editing the black-and-white magazines at the time."

Potts freelanced briefly until joining Neal Adams' commercial art company and comic book packager Continuity Studios and was a member of the Crusty Bunkers. As he explained in a 2000 interview: "Continuity was gearing up to produce black-and-white magazines based on several TV series: The Six Million Dollar Man, Space: 1999, and Emergency!. I got involved with storyboard and comp art for major New York ad agencies. I also produced finished-illustration for magazines and books for several years before joining Marvel's editorial staff in 1983".

In-between, he worked doing storyboards on staff for an ad agency "called Marshalk, that I think got absorbed by McCann Erickson". He said, "I was able to make a lot more money drawing storyboards than doing comics. I would be paid the same amount for drawing a single frame of a storyboard as I would for penciling a full page comics. And the storyboard could be very loose, whereas the comic stuff had to be very tight." But, "I always drew comics when I should have been sleeping and on weekends." That included doing art at DC Comics' Adventure Comics: "I did some Aqualad stuff and some Nightwing and Flamebird stuff. And then I created a new character called Cobalt and plotted in two or three episodes for that before the implosion [of 1978] killed that project."

=== Marvel Comics ===
At Marvel as an editor, Potts discovered and/or mentored many top comics creators including Arthur Adams, Jon Bogdanove, June Brigman, Jim Lee, Mike Mignola, Mike Okamoto, Whilce Portacio, Terry Shoemaker, Steve Skroce, Larry Stroman, Sal Velutto, Chris Warner, and Scott Williams. He oversaw the development of the Punisher from guest star to franchise character, and edited such titles as The Incredible Hulk, Doctor Strange, The Defenders, The Thing, Alpha Flight, and Moon Knight, as well as the newly created Amazing High Adventure, Power Pack, Strikeforce: Morituri, and What The--?!. He was the editor who produced the first Rocket Raccoon miniseries. Potts' editorship was humorously characterized in 1988 as "a remarkable feat considering [his] legendary spelling disability."

After hours, Potts continued to write and produce occasional art for Marvel. He created, plotted and penciled the "Last of the Dragons" serial which appeared in Epic Illustrated #15–20 (Dec. 1982–Oct. 1983; collected as Epic Graphic Novel: Last of the Dragons in 1988), scripted by Dennis O'Neil and inked by Terry Austin. In 1983, Potts teamed with Alan Zelenetz and Frank Cirocco to co-create the series Alien Legion, conceived as "the French Foreign Legion in space." Two ongoing series and several miniseries and one-shots were produced. In 2007, Potts' Alien Legion screenplay was optioned by producer Jerry Bruckheimer and The Walt Disney Company. Bruckheimer exercised the option and bought the script in 2010, hiring David Benioff and the team of Derek Haas and Michael Brandt to do rewrites. In 2023 the rights to his Alien Legion were picked up by Warner Bros., with Tim Miller slated to direct an adaptation. There was no further news and in October 2025 it was announced Miller was attached to direct the movie Shiver starring Keanu Reeves.

Potts wrote and, for the early issues, did layouts for the launch of the Punisher War Journal title in 1988 with Jim Lee doing the finished art. In 1989, Potts was named executive editor in charge of the Epic imprint, and about a third of the mainstream Marvel titles. Five years later, he became editor-in-chief of the "General Entertainment" and Epic Comics divisions.

=== Later career ===
After 13 years at Marvel, Potts left to become Creative Director at VR-1, a massively multiplayer online game company. He then worked with Gary Winnick and Cirocco's Lightsource Studios as vice president, Business and Creative Development. Afterward he became senior creative director of Agency.com and, later, creative director of Teaching Matters. He has taught at the School of Visual Arts and the Academy of Art University. Potts also has served as a strategic and creative consultant for companies including HarperCollins, Acsys, Victorinox Swiss Army, DC Comics, The Learning Company, Mainframe Entertainment, Tokyopop and Jerry Bruckheimer Productions.

== Bibliography ==
=== Books ===
- Potts, Carl (2013). The DC Comics Guide to Creating Comics: Inside the Art of Visual Storytelling. Watson-Guptill. ISBN 978-0385344722.

=== Comics ===
==== Charlton Comics ====
- Space: 1999 magazine #7 (1976)

==== DC Comics ====
- Adventure Comics #453–455 (Aqualad backup stories) (1977–1978)
- Batman Family #11 (1977)
- Richard Dragon: Kung Fu Fighter #2 (1975)
- The Superman Family #183 ("Nightwing and Flamebird" backup story) (1977)
- Time Warp #5 (1980)
- Who's Who: The Definitive Directory of the DC Universe #7, 9 (1985)
- Who's Who: Update '87 #4 (1987)

==== HM Communications, Inc. ====
- Heavy Metal #v2#10, #v4#2 (1979–1980)

==== Marvel Comics ====
- Doctor Strange vol. 2 #63 (1984)
- Heroes for Hope Starring the X-Men #1 (1985)
- Marvel Comics Presents #14, 124, 138–139, 160–163 (1989–1994)
- Marvel Fanfare #42 (Spider-Man) (1989)
- Marvel Holiday Special #2 (1993)
- Moon Knight #32–33, 35 (1983–1984)
- Official Handbook of the Marvel Universe #13 (1984)
- Official Handbook of the Marvel Universe Deluxe Edition #9, 14, 16, 20 (1986–1988)
- Power Man and Iron Fist #82–83, 86–89 (1982–1983)
- Prowler #1–4 (1994–1995)
- The Punisher Movie Special #1 (1990)
- The Punisher War Journal #1–15, 17–24 (1988–1990)
- Punisher: Origin Micro Chip #1–2 (1993)
- Shadowmasters #1–4 (1989–1990)
- Spellbound #1–4, 6 (1988)
- Spider-Man Family #8 (2008)
- Spider-Man Unlimited #4 (1994)
- Spider-Woman #47 (1982)
- Venom: Funeral Pyre #1–3 (1993)
- Venom: The Mace #1–3 (1994)
- Web of Spider-Man #107–108 (1993–1994)
- What If: Secret Invasion #1 (2010)
- Wolverine and the Punisher: Damaging Evidence #1–3 (1993)

===== Epic Comics =====
- Alien Legion #2 (1984)
- Epic Illustrated #1, 13, 15–20 (1980–1983)
- Heavy Hitters Annual #1 (1993)

Preceded by Al Milgrom	The Incredible Hulk vol. 2 editor 1983–1985	Succeeded by Dennis O'Neil
Preceded by Dennis O'Neil	Alpha Flight editor 1985–1990	Succeeded by Danny Fingeroth
Preceded by n/a	The Punisher vol. 2 editor 1987–1989	Succeeded by Don Daley
Preceded by Tom DeFalco	Marvel Comics Group Editor-in-Chiefs licensed-property titles 1994–1995; With: Mark Gruenwald, Marvel Universe titles Bob Harras, X-Men titles Bob Budiansky, Spider-Man titles Bobbie Chase, Marvel Edge titles	Succeeded by Bob Harras
