= Frank Lovece =

American journalist and writer

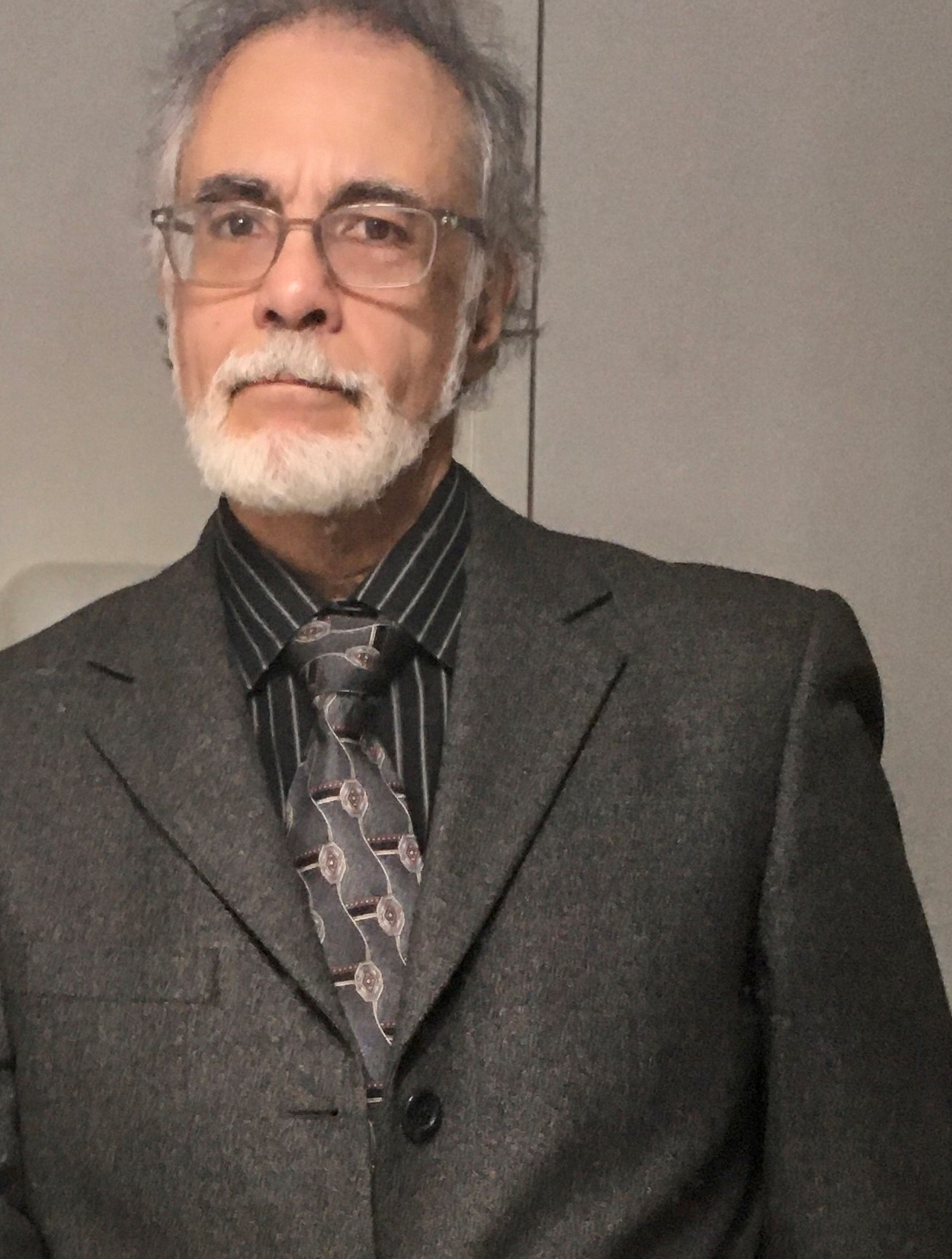
- Born: 1957 (age 68–69) Buenos Aires, Argentina
- Area: Writer
- Notable works: Atomic Age
- Spouse: Maitland McDonagh

Frank Lovece (/lɒˈvɛtʃə/) is an American journalist, author, and a comic book writer primarily for Marvel Comics, where he and artist Mike Okamoto created the miniseries Atomic Age. His longest affiliation has been with the New York metropolitan area newspaper Newsday, where he has worked as a feature writer and film critic.

He was a nationally syndicated columnist for United Media/Newspaper Enterprise Association (NEA) for more than nine years, writing weekly interview features with filmmakers and performers. He is the author of several books and has also written for numerous publications including Billboard, Entertainment Weekly, the Los Angeles Times, the New York Post, Penthouse, Sound & Vision, and The Village Voice. One of his inflight-magazine features, a profile of telecommunications entrepreneur René Anselmo, was entered into the U.S. Congressional Record.

== Early life ==
Lovece was born in Buenos Aires, Argentina. He is the son of Italian immigrants. He moved to the U.S as a toddler and was raised in Keyser and Morgantown, West Virginia. There his family ran Italian restaurants. He attended St. Francis High School and West Virginia University in Morgantown, where he was the arts/entertainment editor of the college newspaper, the Daily Athenaeum. He graduated with a Bachelor of Arts in Communications.

== Career ==
=== Print journalism ===
In the early 1980s, Lovece was on staff at Video Review magazine, and by mid-decade had begun freelancing for that publication and others including video- and media-focused outlets such as American Film and Video, as well as mass-market periodicals including the Los Angeles Times, the New York Post, Penthouse, The Village Voice, and several airline inflight magazines. He was a music critic for Audio and Faces, and a video-technology columnist and home-video feature writer for the trade magazine Billboard. His features have covered subjects ranging from pop culture and technology to film and television. One of his inflight-magazine articles, on telecommunications mogul René Anselmo, was entered into the U.S. Congressional Record in 1995.

He was a nationally syndicated columnist for United Media/Newspaper Enterprise Association (NEA) for more than nine years in the 1980s and 1990s, writing weekly interview features with filmmakers and performers. For that syndicate he additionally wrote shorter-run columns on home video and on cable-TV programming.

For Entertainment Weekly, Lovece wrote, in addition to film and TV features and featurettes, a comic-book column. His stories for the magazine included interviews with filmmakers and others, and analyses of pop culture and comics. In 1991, he produced the first home video (footage of his own child) to obtain an MPAA rating for an Entertainment Weekly article. For Newsday, from the 1990s to 2020s, he has worked as a feature writer and film critic, producing entertainment features and reviews that also were syndicated to other outlets.

He additionally was a film critic for Film Journal International, the New York Post, The Record of northern New Jersey and TV Guide Online, and was a syndicated film critic through the Associated Press and the Catholic News Service.

Together with the editors of Consumer Guide, Lovece wrote TV Trivia: Thirty Years of Television, published in 1984. This was followed by Hailing 'Taxi': The Official Book of the Show (1988) and similar books on topic including the TV series The Brady Bunch and The X-Files. By 1990, Lovece had become a writer and film critic for Newsday. He also wrote an unofficial book guide for Godzilla, but after Godzilla franchise owner Toho filed a lawsuit, a district court judge in 1998 issued a preliminary injunction blocking the book from release in the United States due to alleged trademark violation. The book was published in Europe.

=== Comic books ===
Lovece and artist Mike Okamoto created the four-issue miniseries Atomic Age (Nov. 1990 – Feb. 1991) for Marvel Comics’ creator-owned Epic Comics imprint. Lovece also wrote stories for Marvel’s Nightstalkers, Hokum & Hex, Ghost Rider Annual, and The Incredible Hulk Annual. His story “For My Son,” co-created with artist Bill Koeb, appeared in Clive Barker’s Hellraiser Summer Special and was later collected in Clive Barker’s Hellraiser: Collected Best. He also has written for Dark Horse Comics and Harris Comics.

He edited Stan Lee’s God Woke, written by Stan Lee and Fabian Nicieza, which won the 2017 Independent Publisher Book Award for Outstanding Books of the Year – Independent Voice Award. During this period, he served as editor-in-chief of the independent comics publishers Shatner Singularity and Apex Comics Group.

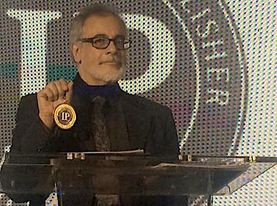
Lovece receiving an award for editing Stan Lee's God Woke at the Independent Publisher Book Awards

=== Later career ===
He has written articles for Habitat, Entertainment Weekly, Newsday, Yahoo!/MSN.

Beyond print journalism, Lovece has written for online and broadcast media. He served as a web editor for Gist TV/Yahoo!, Sound & Vision and the Sci Fi Channel.

In 2005, Lovece and photographer Matthew Jordan Smith collaborated on the book Lost and Found, a photojournalistic record of families of abducted children and the work of The National Center for Missing & Exploited Children. He has also appeared on media and pop-culture panels at conventions and at the Museum of the Moving Image in New York City.

== Bibliography ==
=== Books ===
- Lovece, Frank. TV Trivia: Thirty Years of Television (1984) New York: Beekman House / Publications International. ISBN 0-517-46367-9
- Lovece, Frank, with Jules Franco. Hailing Taxi: The Official Book of the Show (1988) New York: Prentice Hall Press ISBN 0-13-372103-5, ISBN 978-0-13-372103-4
  - Reissued and updated: Taxi: The Official Fan's Guide (1996) New York: Citadel Press ISBN 0-8065-1801-4, ISBN 978-0-8065-1801-5
- Edelstein, Andrew J., and Frank Lovece. The Brady Bunch Book (1990) New York: Warner Books. ISBN 0-446-39137-9
- Lovece, Frank (1992). The Television Yearbook. New York: Perigee Books / Putnam Publishing. ISBN 0-399-51702-2, ISBN 978-0-399-51702-0
- Lovece, Frank. The X-Files Declassified (1996) New York: Citadel Press. ISBN 0-8065-1745-X, ISBN 978-0-8065-1745-2
  - U.K. edition: The X-Files Declassified : The Truth!: The Unauthorized Guide to the Complete Series (1996) London: Hodder & Stoughton. ISBN 0-340-68232-9, ISBN 978-0-340-68232-6
- Lovece, Frank. Godzilla: The Complete Guide to Moviedom's Mightiest Monster. Originally scheduled 1998 by William Morrow / Quill. ISBN 0-688-15603-7; ISBN 978-0-688-15603-9. Subjected to prior restraint in U.S.; released overseas.
- Smith, Michael Jordan (photographer), and Frank Lovece. Lost and Found (2006) New York: Filipacchi Publishing. ISBN 1-59975-611-0, ISBN 978-1-59975-611-0

=== Comics ===
==== Dark Horse Comics ====
- Dark Horse Presents #110-112 (story "Egg")

==== Harris Comics ====
- Creepy (magazine) 1993 Fearbook (story "One Good Deed")

==== Marvel Comics ====
- Marvel 2099 Special: The World of Doom #1
- Ghost Rider Annual #2 (backup story)
- The Incredible Hulk Annual (backup story)
- Masked Rider #1
- Saban's Mighty Morphin Power Rangers #2
- Saban's Mighty Morphin Power Rangers: Ninja Rangers/VR Troopers #1-3

==== Marvel Comics/Epic Comics ====
- Atomic Age #1-4
- Clive Barker's Hellraiser Dark Holiday Special #1 (story "Nursery Crime")
- Clive Barker's Hellraiser Summer Special #1 (story "For My Son" - reprinted in Checker Publishing book Clive Barker's Hellraiser: Collected Best

==== Marvel Comics/Razorline ====
- Hokum & Hex #1-9
- Hyperkind Unleashed! #1 (prose short story)
- Razorline: The First Cut #1 (omnibus story reprinted in Ectokid #1

==== RZG Commics ====
- Phazer #3, 5
- Phazer Crossover #2
