= The Bozz Chronicles =

Science fiction comic book series

Publication information
- Publisher: Epic Comics (Marvel)
- Genre: Science fiction
- Publication date: 1985–1986

Creative team
- Created by: David Michelinie
- Written by: David Michelinie
- Artist: Bret Blevins

The Bozz Chronicles is an American six-issue science fiction comic book series written by David Michelinie, with artwork by Bret Blevins and John Ridgway. The original series was published by Epic Comics from December 1985 - December 1986. The series was set primarily in Victorian era England and centered on the crime-solving adventures of "Bozz", an alien with a long tail and an unpronounceable name who crash-landed on Earth. Bozz partners with prostitute Amanda Flynn and American Salem Hawkshaw to solve crimes as a means of stimulating his mind and avoiding suicidal thoughts brought on by ennui. Most mysteries presented in the series were paranormal or speculative in nature, for example, resurrection, death rays, and portals to hell. The six-issue series was collected into one publication by Dover Publications in 2015.
