= Darkstars =

Fictional police group in DC Comics

- Ferrin Colos and his Darkstar deputies, in Darkstars #3 (December 1992). Art by Larry Stroman (pencils), Scott Hanna (inks), and Juliana Ferriter (colors).

Group publication information
- Publisher: DC Comics
- First appearance: Darkstars #1 (October 1992)
- Created by: Michael Jan Friedman (writer); Larry Stroman (artist)

In-story information
- Member(s): 2nd Generation; Tomar-Tu; Guy Gardner; Countless unnamed members 1st Generation; Aliens; Administrator Sleer Prigatz; Captain Zifor; Ferrin Colos; Chaser Bron; Munchuk; Merayn Dethalis; Nuvah Jeddigar; Xax; Varix; Lotta; Hollika Rahn; Galius Zed; G'nort; Medphyll; Humans; John Stewart; Donna Troy; Carla White; Mo Douglas; John Flint; Charlie Vicker

Darkstars
- : The heroic Darkstars made their debut on the issue of Darkstars #1 (October 1992). Art by Travis Charest & Larry Stroman.

Series publication information
- Schedule: Monthly
- Format: Ongoing series
- Genre: Superhero
- Publication date: (vol. 1); October 1992 – January 1996
- Number of issues: (vol. 1): 38

Creative team
- Writer(s): Michael Jan Friedman
- Penciller(s): Larry Stroman; Travis Charest; Patrick Zircher; Mitch Byrd; Mike Collins
- Creator(s): Michael Jan Friedman (writer); Larry Stroman (artist)

The Darkstars were a group of intergalactic policemen that appeared in comic books published by DC Comics. They were introduced in Darkstars #1 (October 1992), and were created by Michael Jan Friedman and Larry Stroman. The series lasted a total of 39 issues, ending with issue #38 (Jan. 1996), with an issue #0 (Oct. 1994) published between issues #24 and 25 during the Zero Hour: Crisis in Time! crossover event storyline.

== Development ==
In an interview, Michael Jan Friedman spoke on the genesis of the group, stating:

I went to the Justice League editor and said, “You know, I would like to do a Martian Manhunter story,” and he goes, “You know we have so much inventory on Martian Manhunter solo stories.” And I said, “Well, I would like to do Green Lantern”… “Well we got so much inventory on Green Lantern,” and I was like alright, okay, I get it, those were two of my favorite superheroes at DC growing up, and I said, “Boy, someday I'll do a Green Lantern story or a Martian Manhunter story.”

So anyway, I go to lunch with Bob [Greenberger] and Brian [Augustyn] and they can see I'm a little disappointed. So they said, “Well, what is it about those characters you really like?”, and I was talking about Green Lantern and how he's part of this Corps, and I thought that was cool and that made him a little different from other characters. And then the Martian Manhunter was the last of his kind, he was lonely, he had super powers that were very much like Superman's but he was bald and green and just not as popular, and that appealed to me. So they said, “Well, what if you were to put Green Lantern and Martian Manhunter together, what would you get?” And next thing you know I get home and I'm writing notes and by the next day I had a little proposal for Brian, a thing called Darkstars and it was really a mashup of Green Lantern and Martian Manhunter.

== Publication history ==
=== Creation ===
The Darkstars were founded by the Controllers, an offshoot of the Guardians of the Universe. Though their goal was to establish order in the universe, the Controllers were isolationists by nature.

The Controllers created NEMO, the Network for the Establishment and Maintenance of Order, to isolate the troubles of the galaxy away from the Controllers' domain. Over the millennia, the Controllers realized they would have to take a more active stance by attacking chaos at its roots. Despite all the good they did, there were too many NEMO operatives in too many different places. NEMO and the Controllers devised a new plan to ensure order, which resulted in the creation of the Darkstars.

=== Downfall ===
As time went on, the Controllers express concerns about the effectiveness of the Darkstars. More specifically, they are troubled that Darkstar agents are mostly looking after their own agendas rather than those of the Controllers. The Controllers eventually withdraw their support for the Darkstars; this causes the members who use early Darkstar uniforms to lose their powers, as they rely on energy from the Controllers. The later, self-contained suits are unaffected. Many Darkstars are killed or lose their battlesuits in battle with Grayven. The last of the Darkstars (Ferrin Colos, Chaser Bron, and Munchuk) are killed while battling Starbreaker.

== Powers and abilities ==
The Darkstars utilize armor called an "exo-mantle" which grants superhuman strength, speed, high-speed flight, and the ability to project a force field that can absorb kinetic impacts. The exo-mantle is equipped with twin maser units capable of firing energy bolts with pinpoint accuracy, as well as a shoulder-mounted cannon.

== Other versions ==
=== Earth-15 ===
A group partially inspired by the Darkstars called the Blackstars appears in The Green Lantern: Blackstars.

=== Absolute Universe ===
The Blackstars appear in Absolute Green Lantern. This version is also known as Weaponers of Qard.
