= Larry Stroman =

American comic book artist and writer

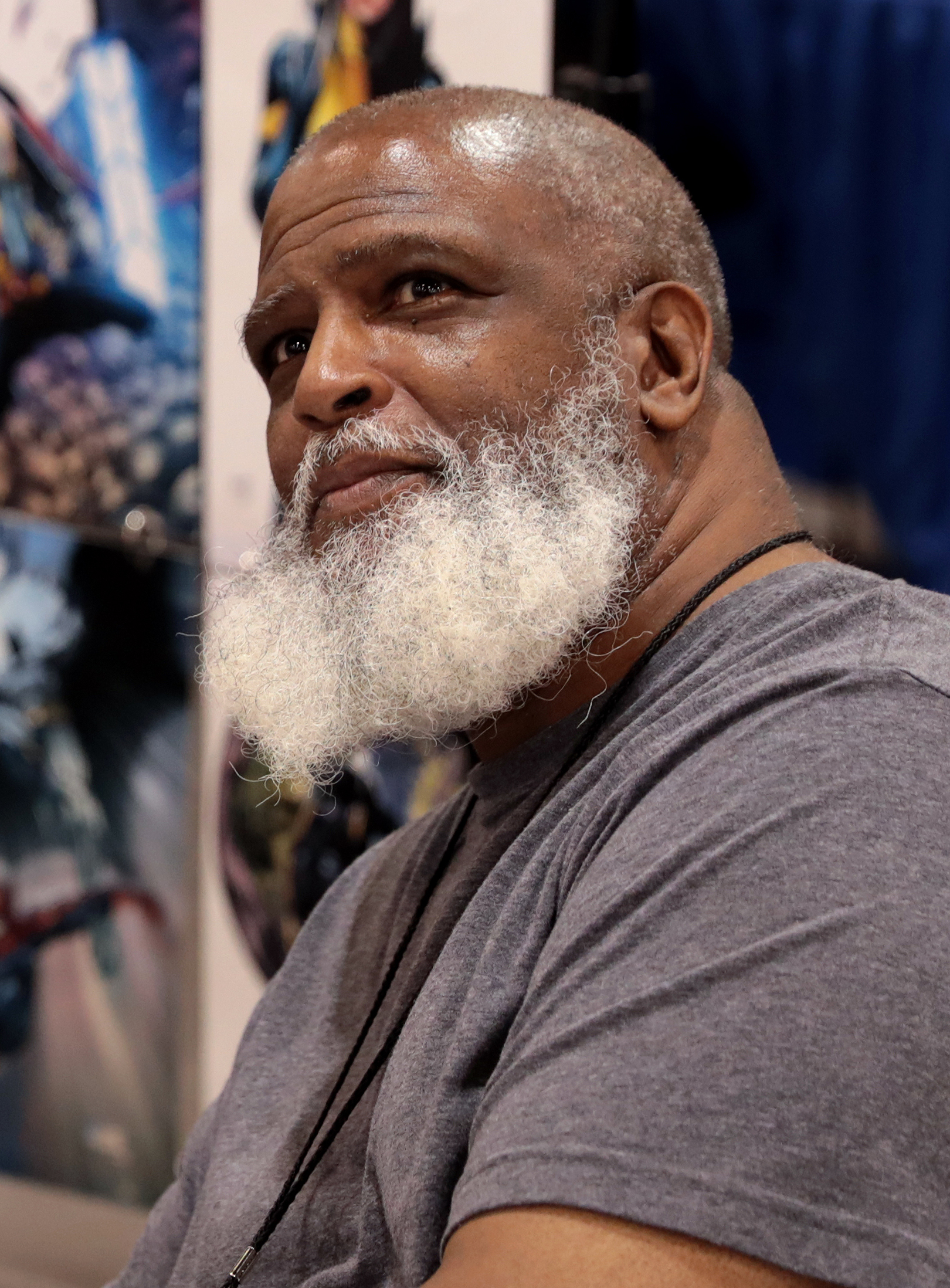
- Stroman in 2019
- Area: Penciller
- Notable works: Alien Legion (vol. 2); The Uncanny X-Men; X-Factor

Larry Stroman is an American comic book artist and writer. After first gaining attention illustrating the Epic Comics series Alien Legion (vol. 2), he went on to illustrate various Marvel Comics books such as The Uncanny X-Men, X-Factor, Ghost Rider (vol. 2) and Punisher, as well as work for other companies, such as DC Comics' Darkstars and Dark Horse Comics' The Mark. He briefly published a creator-owned series called The Tribe with Image Comics in the early 1990s.

== Career ==
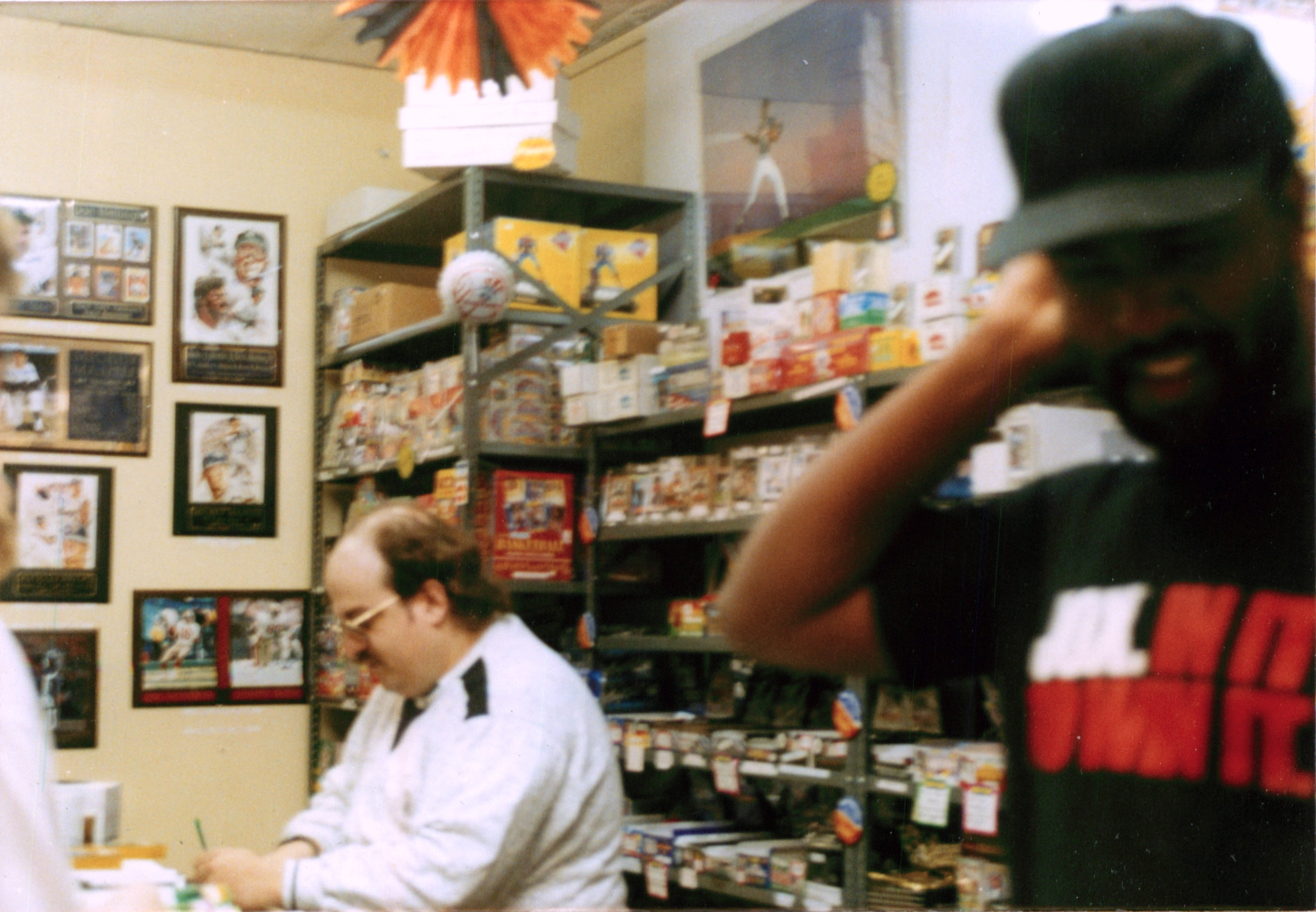
Peter David and Larry Stroman at a comic book signing for X-Factor in the early 1990s.

Stroman was interested in comic books from a very young age; until he could afford to buy them himself he would read comics handed down to him from his brother or loaned from friends. He began his career with the goal of being a comic book artist, but "became sidetracked by a lot of other stuff" and worked first as a draftsman, before moving to New York City and working as a portrait artist for a few years.

While working on comics, Stroman prefers the Marvel method of creation. To avoid pacing problems at the end of a comic (due to running low on space), he would draw the last few pages of each story immediately after drawing the first page, drawing the middle pages last.

Stroman's earliest work in the American comic book industry was in 1985, when he illustrated back-up stories in First Comics' American Flagg! #21–23 and World's Finest Comics #316–317 for DC Comics. He then illustrated Alien Legion (vol. 2) #10–20 for Marvel Comics. His association with Alien Legion would continue with his handling of the art duties on the first 18 issues of that series' next volume, which premiered in 1987, the 1990 three-issue miniseries Alien Legion: On the Edge, and the 1991 miniseries Alien Legion: Tenants of Hell. During this time he also drew other Marvel books, such as an Alpha Flight Annual, Cloak and Dagger, What The--?! and Ghost Rider, as well as books for other publishers, such as The Mark #3 for Dark Horse Comics, and The Law of Dredd #24 for Fleetway-Quality. These jobs sometimes consisted of sharing art contributions with other artists on certain issues, such as drawing a small number of pages of Uncanny X-Men #273 and providing spot illustration for the reference series Who's Who in the DC Universe #9, both of which were published in 1991.

That same year, following the "Muir Island Saga" storyline that altered the status quo of the X-Men family of books, the series X-Factor embarked on a new direction, with a new cast and storyline, on which Stroman joined writer Peter David. Initially he was brought on as a fill-in artist, but was soon offered X-Factor as a regular assignment and given approval to redesign the characters' costumes and overall appearance as he saw fit. Stroman was the regular artist on the series from issue 71 to issue 81. Following the end of his run on that title, he drew a number of other books, such as Wolverine, Punisher and Darkstars.

In 1993, Stroman and writer Todd Johnson co-created the Image Comics series Tribe, which is the largest-selling African-American-created comic of all time, when sales to comic shops for issue #1 exceeded the one million mark. After the title was canceled in the "Image shakeup" of 1994, Stroman and Johnson founded Axis Comics to continue publication of Tribe, but the company closed after publishing only nine issues. In a press release, Stroman cited a change in his working relationship with Johnson, and "increased production costs, creator apathy, and unforeseen market factors."

Stroman's subsequent work in the 1990s included illustrating WildC.A.T.s: Covert Action Teams Annual #1 for Jim Lee's Wildstorm Productions/Image, and a number of Marvel titles including X-Men: The Early Years, Excalibur and Heroes Reborn: Iron Man.

Stroman's 2000s work includes various installments of the recurring The Official Handbook of the Marvel Universe reference series, including The Official Handbook of the Marvel Universe: Teams 2005 and two issues of the 2007 book The Official Handbook of the Marvel Universe: A to Z: Update, as well as What-If X-Men: Rise and Fall of the Shi'Ar Empire, and Black Panther Annual #1 with Reginald Hudlin and Ken Lashley. In 2008 Stroman was reunited with his X-Factor collaborator Peter David, illustrating issues #33–36 and 38 of volume 3 of that series. Stroman subsequently illustrated the three-issue miniseries X-Men: The Times and Life of Lucas Bishop miniseries, and Thunderbolts #144, both in 2009.
