= Bret Blevins =

American comic book artist

- Born: August 13, 1960 (age 66)
- Areas: Penciller, Inker
- Notable works: The Bozz Chronicles; New Mutants; Sleepwalker
- Awards: Emmy Awards, 1999

Bret Blevins (sometimes spelled Brett Blevins; born August 13, 1960) is an American comics artist, animation storyboard artist, and painter. He is perhaps best known for his stint as the regular penciler of New Mutants for Marvel Comics.

== Career ==
After cartooning for a local newspaper, Blevins became a professional comic book artist in the early 1980s. During that time, Blevins drew Marvel Comics' adaptations of films such as The Dark Crystal, Krull, and The Last Starfighter. Blevins was a guest artist on a number of titles before co-creating The Bozz Chronicles with writer David Michelinie, which was published under Marvel's creator-owned Epic Comics imprint. Blevins' first regular work on a superhero comic was on the 1987 revival of Strange Tales which was an anthology that featured two ongoing features produced by two different creative teams — Cloak and Dagger drawn by Blevins, and Doctor Strange. That same year, Blevins became the regular artist on New Mutants and drew the majority of issues from #55 (Sept. 1987) to #85 (Jan. 1990). He drew the Sleepwalker series in 1991–1992. Blevins was to have drawn an adaptation of The Wolf Man for Dark Horse Comics in the early 1990s but the project was cancelled before completion.

Blevins then began to work mainly for DC Comics, mainly on the Batman: Shadow of the Bat series and various Batman one-shots and limited series. He was one of the main artists for the character during the "KnightsEnd" storyline.

In 1996, Blevins moved into the field of television animation. He primarily drew storyboards for Warner Bros. produced cartoons such as Superman: The Animated Series, The New Batman/Superman Adventures, Batman Beyond, and the Justice League. In 1996, Blevins won two Emmy Awards for his storyboard contributions to some of those shows. Blevins stopped regularly drawing storyboards in 2005. In 2018, Blevins collaborated with writer Joe Keatinge on the Stellar limited series published by Image Comics.

With the July 13, 2022 publication date of The Phantom daily comic strip, Blevins began filling in as ghost artist while regular artist Mike Manley dealt with health issues.

== Bibliography ==
=== DC Comics ===
- Batman Annual #19 (1995)
- Batman: Brotherhood of the Bat #1 (1995)
- Batman Day Special Edition #1 (three pages) (2017)
- Batman: Gotham Nights II #4 (1995)
- Batman: Legends of the Dark Knight #50 (1993)
- Batman: Shadow of the Bat #16–18, 21–23, 25–33, 0, 50 (1993–1996)
- Convergence Justice League International #2 (2015)
- Harley Quinn vol. 3 #2–3, 8, 10, 13, 17–25, 32–33 (2016–2018)
- Harley Quinn: Harley Loves Joker #1–2 (2018)
- Harley Quinn: Road Trip Special #1 (2015)
- Shade #3 (1997)
- Starman Annual #1 (1996)
- Supergirl Plus #1 (1997)
- Superman #660 (2007)
- Superman Adventures #5, 21, 39, 41 (1997–2000)
- Vigilante: City Lights, Prairie Justice #3–4 (1996)
- Who's Who: The Definitive Directory of the DC Universe #8–9 (1985)

=== Disney Comics ===
- Disney Adventures Comic Zone #Winter 2004, #Winter 2005 (2004–2005)

=== Hamilton Comics ===
- Saban's Mighty Morphin Power Rangers #1 Cover Art (1994)

=== Image Comics ===
- Stellar #1–6 (2018)

=== Marvel Comics ===
- Cloak and Dagger vol. 2 #10 (1987)
- Conan #7 (1996)
- The Destroyer #8 (1990)
- Doctor Strange vol. 2 #70 (1985)
- Excalibur #28 (1990)
- Ghost Rider vol. 3 #32–37 (1992–1993)
- Heroes for Hope Starring the X-Men #1 (1985)
- The Incredible Hulk vol. 2 #310 (1985)
- Indiana Jones and the Last Crusade #1–4 (1989)
- Marvel Comics Presents #106 (1992)
- Marvel Fanfare #56–58 (Shanna the She-Devil) (1991)
- Marvel Graphic Novel: The Inhumans (1988)
- Marvel Super Special #24 (The Dark Crystal); #28 (Krull); #31 (The Last Starfighter) (1983–1984)
- Marvel Team-Up #149 (1985)
- Marvel Universe #5 (1998)
- New Mutants #49, 55, 57–61, 64–69, 71–74, 79–80, 82–83; 85 (inker), Summer Special #1 (1987–1990)
- Nightmask #1 (1986)
- Official Handbook of the Marvel Universe #2, 4, 6–7, 11–12 (1983)
- Official Handbook of the Marvel Universe Deluxe Edition #8–10 (1986)
- Official Handbook of the Marvel Universe Update '89 #7 (1989)
- The Saga of Crystar, Crystal Warrior #1–2 (1983)
- Sleepwalker #1–3, 5–11, 13–17, 25 (1991–1993)
- Solomon Kane #1–3 (1985–1986)
- Star Wars #89 (1984)
- Strange Tales vol. 2 #1–10 (1987–1988)
- Thor #371–372 (1986)
- Uncanny X-Men #211, 219, Annual #7 (1984–1987)

==== Epic Comics ====
- Akira #38 (1996)
- The Bozz Chronicles #1–6 (1985–1986)
- Clive Barker's Nightbreed #6–7 (1990–1991)
- Heavy Hitters Annual #1 (1993)
- The Shadowline Saga Critical Mass #5 (1990)
- The Trouble with Girls: Night of the Lizard #1–4 (1993)

=== Pacific Comics ===
- Twisted Tales #3 (1983)

=== Philomel Books ===
- Redwall: The Graphic Novel (2007)

=== Valiant Comics ===
- Ninjak #20 (1995)

Preceded by n/a	Strange Tales vol. 2 artist 1987–1988	Succeeded by Dan Lawlis
Preceded by Jackson Guice	New Mutants artist 1987–1989	Succeeded by Terry Shoemaker
Preceded by n/a	Sleepwalker artist 1991–1992	Succeeded by Kelly Krantz
Preceded by Joe Staton	Batman: Shadow of the Bat artist 1993–1994	Succeeded by Barry Kitson
