= Stan Lee's God Woke =

Graphic novel by Stan Lee (2016)

- Cover art by Mariano Nicieza
- Date: 2016
- Page count: 128 pages
- Publisher: Shatner Singularity

Creative team
- Creator: Stan Lee; Fabian Nicieza; Mariano Nicieza

Stan Lee's God Woke is a 2016 graphic novel by former Marvel Comics editor and publisher Stan Lee, using the text of his 1970s epic poem. Comic-book writer Fabian Nicieza created visualizations to match the text, with artwork by his brother Mariano Nicieza and others. It was published by Shatner Singularity, founded by actor and author William Shatner. In addition to the main story, the book also contains the poem by itself, the visualization script, a 16-page background article and a newly written afterword by Lee.

The book won the 2017 Independent Publisher Book Awards' Outstanding Books of the Year Independent Voice Award, while an animated short adapted from it won film festival awards.

== Publication history ==
Stan Lee introduced his epic poem "God Woke" during the 1972 event A Night with Stan Lee at Carnegie Hall, where it was recited by Lee's wife and daughter. In the mid 2010s, Mariano Nicieza, president of the publishing company Shatner Singularity, founded by actor and author William Shatner, negotiated with Lee and with Gil Champion of Lee's POW! Entertainment to adapt the poem as a graphic novel.

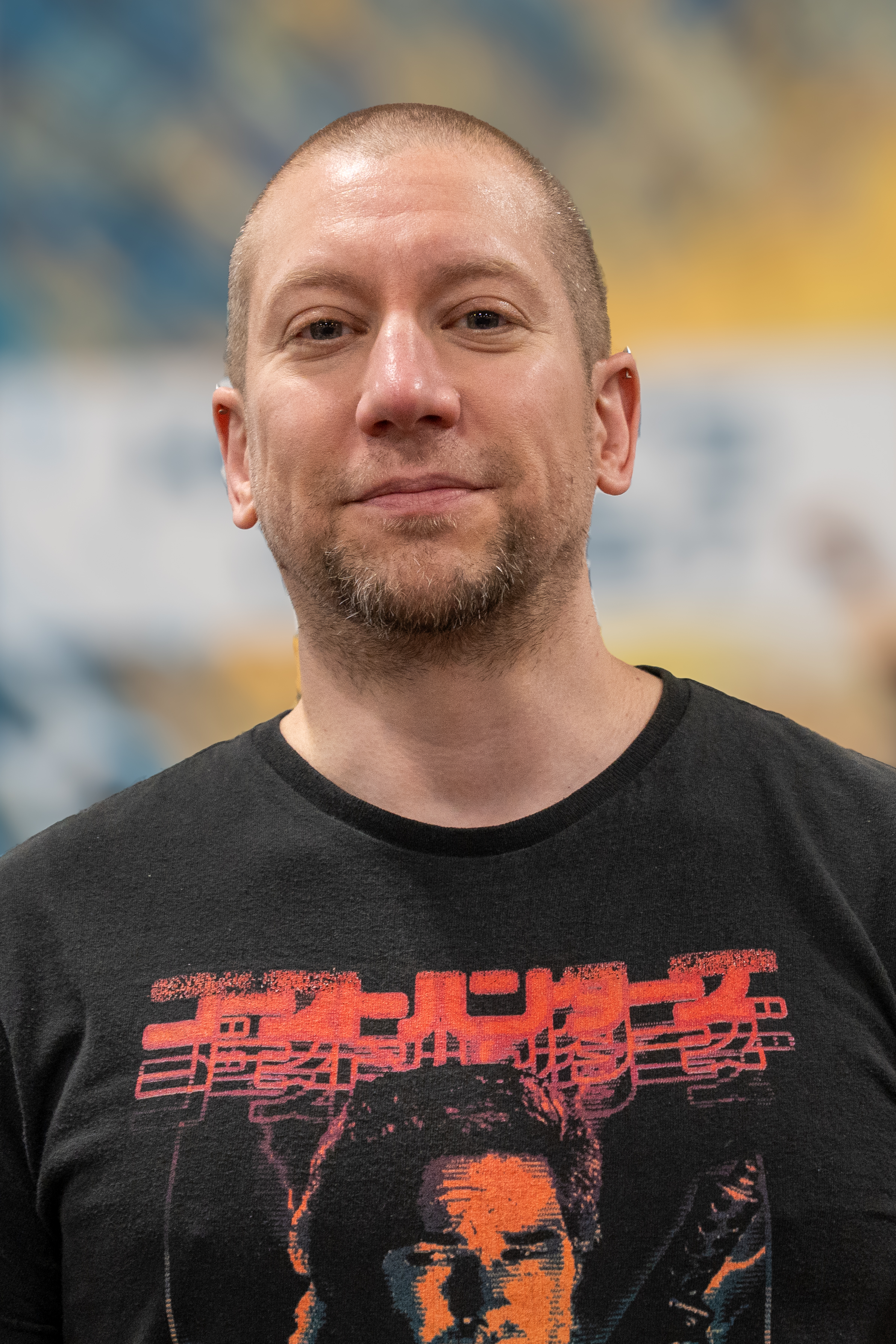
Nadir Balan at Comic Con Oakland 2026

Nicieza's brother, comic-book writer Fabian Nicieza, created visualizations to match the text. Mariano Nicieza became the primary artist on the book, abetted by artists Nadir Balan, Shane Connoly, Rick Emond, Walter Flanagan, John Hebert, Wilson Ramos Jr., Michael Yakutis and Kelly Zimmerman. The book was edited by Shatner Singularity editor-in-chief Frank Lovece, with Matt Murray credited as POW! Entertainment editor. Ramos served as the publisher's art director and lettered the book, and he and Mariano Nicieza were the colorists. The project was overseen by editor Frank Lovece.

Lee introduced Stan Lee's 'God Woke' at a panel at the 2016 Comic-Con International.

Lee in 2017 said of poem, "Sometimes you get a thought in your mind and it won’t let go. I’ve had some notions about man’s relationship with God that kept spinning around my brain 'til I had to put them down on paper. That’s the reason for 'God Woke'. Or, you might think of it as therapy for Stan."

== Synopsis ==
God, depicted as a monumental, featureless being, has grown bored and visits Earth to see what humanity has done with his creation. Through a series of vignettes, He sees love and family as well as war and atrocities, and ponders all that has been wrought in His name. Ultimately, he finds the balance tipped toward tragedy and inhumanity, and in the end, "God cried."

The accompanying 16-page background article "Stan Lee's 75th Anniversary in Comics: A Tribute from Peers and Pros" by Frank Lovece includes sidebar encomiums from Tom DeFalco, Danny Fingeroth, Gerard Jones, Tony Isabella, Larry Lieber, Roy Thomas, Jim Salicrup, Dan Slott, and Gregory Wright.

== In other media ==
An animated short adaptation in 2016 was directed by Gary Laird. It runs 12 minutes, and uses audio of Stan Lee's narration of the poem from the 2002 DVD release Stan Lee's Mutants, Monsters & Marvels.

An audio recording of that narration had been released in 2013 as the spoken word single "God Woke", with a portion of the proceeds in 2017 earmarked for the charitable organization the Hero Initiative.

== Awards ==
The print-book version won the 2017 Independent Publisher Book Awards' Outstanding Books of the Year Independent Voice Award.

The animated short won Best Animated Film at the 25th Independent Filmmakers Showcase Film Festival in 2017.
