= Official Handbook of the Conan Universe =

Publication information
- Publisher: Marvel Comics
- Format: One-Shot
- Publication date: January 1986
- Main character(s): Conan, Red Sonja, Kull

Creative team
- Created by: Robert E. Howard, Roy Thomas
- Written by: Alan Zelenetz
- Penciller(s): John Buscema, Bob Camp, Ernie Chan, Vince Colletta, Mike Docherty, Armando Gil, Geof Isherwood, Mike Kaluta (cover), Andy Kubert, Gary Kwapisz, Dave Simons, Vincent Waller and Mary Wilshire
- Colorist(s): Steve Mellor

The Official Handbook of the Conan Universe is an encyclopedic guide which details the fictional universe featured in Conan publications of Marvel Comics. The one-shot issue was published in comic book format in 1986, followed by reprints in 1993. The main author and researcher was comic book writer Alan Zelenetz.

== Origin ==
Jim Shooter, Marvel's then editor-in-chief, conceived of the idea, envisioning a guide detailing statistics much in the manner of those found on the backs of baseball cards. Shooter appointed Mark Gruenwald editor of the project, and Gruenwald developed the project to include all aspects of the Marvel Universe, although he noted it was not comprehensive. The project was named The Official Handbook of the Marvel Universe (OHOTMU) and was published in its first volume from 1983 to 1984 in comic book format in 15 issues. Not included in these handbooks were licensed characters like Conan and creator-owned characters like Red Sonja. To cover these kind of characters connected to the Hyborian Age and world, a one-shot guide with the name The Official Handbook of the Conan Universe was made in the style of the first volume of the OHOTMU and published with the start of the second volume of the OHOTMU.

The Official Handbook of the Conan Universe detailed the more significant characters, locations and races of the Hyborian age, itemizing them into individual entries. Individual entries usually consisted of:

- A frontal full-body view of the character
- Prose text describing the character's or race's origin, powers, and other abilities and unique traits. The original edition opted only to describe the "Origins" (how they acquired their powers), instead focusing heavily on detailed explanations for how those powers functioned.
- Example images of the character or race in action, taken directly from the comics themselves

The Official Handbook of the Conan Universe entries were listed at one major character to a page, minor characters or races were often listed at two to a page.

== Publication history ==
The handbook came out as a one-shot issue in 1986. In 1993 it was reprinted in black and white (with a different cover and a cover-inside-poster) and then released in June in a polybagged issue with Conan Saga #75 and again in August as a freebie included in Wizard magazine. In July 2014, the handbook was included in The Chronicles of Conan Vol. 27.

== Bibliography ==
=== The Official Handbook of the Conan Universe ===
Original Series #1 (Marvel Comics, January 1986)
#	Version	Entries	Month of publ.	Pages	Orig. price
1	Original	Aesgaard, Afghulistan, Aquilonia, Argos, Arms and armor, Atlantis, Bamula, Barachan Isles, Belit, Black Kingdoms, Border Kingdom, Bossonia, Brythunia, Cimmeria, Conan, Corinthia, Gods and Worship, map of Hyboria, Hyperborea, Hyrkania, Iranistan, Khitai, Koth, Kozaki, Kull, Kush, Nemedia, Ophir, Pictland, Red Sonja, Shem, Sorcery and demoncraft, Stygia, Tiazitlans, Tranicos, Turan, Valeria, Vanaheim, Venarium, Vendhya, Zamora, Zingara	January 1986	34	$1.25
-	Reprint (b/w) with Conan Saga #75	as above, but instead of a big map of Hyboria, it contains five tiny maps of Aquilonia, Cimmeria, Stygia, Vendhya and Hyboria	June 1993	34	-
-	Reprint (b/w) with Wizard	same as above	August 1993	34	-
-	Collected in The Chronicles of Conan Vol. 27	same as above (ISBN 1-6165-5373-1)	July 2014	255	$19.99

== See also ==
- Official Handbook of the Marvel Universe
- Conan and the Barbarians comic index
