= Doctor Strange (comic book) =

Comic book

- Doctor Strange #177 (February 1969), the debut of Strange's short-lived new look. Cover art by Gene Colan and Tom Palmer

Publication information
- Publisher: Marvel Comics
- Genre: Superhero
- Publication date: (vol. 1); June 1968 – November 1969 (vol. 2); June 1974 – February 1987 (Sorcerer Supreme); November 1988 – June 1996 (vol. 3); February 1999 – May 1999 (vol. 4); December 2015 – April 2017 (vol. 1 cont.); January 2018 – July 2018 (vol. 5); August 2018 – December 2019 (Dr. Strange); February 2020 – October 2020 (vol. 6); May 2023 – October 2024
- No. of issues: (vol. 1); 15 (#169–183) (vol. 2); 81 (#1–81) (Sorcerer Supreme); 90 (#1–90) (vol. 3); 4 (#1–4) (vol. 4); 36 (#1–26, #381–390) (vol. 5); 20 (#1–20) (Dr. Strange); 6 (#1–6) (vol. 6); 18 (#1–18)
- Main character: Doctor Strange

Creative team
- Written by: List: (vol. 1) Roy Thomas (169–178, 180–183), Stan Lee (179), Donny Cates (381–390) (vol. 2) Steve Englehart (1–18), Marv Wolfman (19–20, 22–23, Annual #1), Jim Starlin (24–26), Roger Stern (27–30, 32–33, 35–37, 46–62, 65–73, 75), Don McGregor (31), Ralph Macchio (33–37), Chris Claremont (38–45), Carl Potts (63), Ann Nocenti (64), Peter Gillis (74, 76–81) (Sorcerer Supreme) Peter Gillis (1–4), Roy Thomas (5–24, 26–47, 52–56, Annual #2), Fabian Nicieza (25), Len Kaminski (48–50, 52), Geof Isherwood (51–59, Annual #3), David Quinn (60–67, 69–79), Dan Abnett (68), Warren Ellis (80–82), Todd DeZago (81, 83), J. M. DeMatteis (84–90) (vol. 3) Dan Jolley, Tony Harris & Ray Snyder (1–4) (vol. 4) Jason Aaron (1–20), Dennis Hallum (21–24), John Barber (25–26) (vol. 5) Mark Waid (1–20) (Dr. Strange) Mark Waid (1–6) (vol. 6) Jed MacKay (1–18)

Doctor Strange is a series of several comic book volumes featuring the character Doctor Strange and published by Marvel Comics, beginning with the original Doctor Strange comic book series that debuted in 1968.

== Publication history ==
=== Doctor Strange vol. 1 ===
The original Strange Tales series ended with issue #168 (May 1968). The following month, Doctor Strange's adventures continued in the full-length Doctor Strange #169, with Nick Fury moving to the newly launched Nick Fury, Agent of S.H.I.E.L.D.

Expanded to 20 pages per issue, the Doctor Strange solo series ran 15 issues, #169-183 (June 1968 – November 1969), continuing the numbering of Strange Tales. Roy Thomas wrote the run of new stories, joined after the first three issues by the art team of penciler Gene Colan and inker Tom Palmer through the end. Colan drastically altered the look of the series, as Thomas recounted: "... he had his own view of what these other worlds should look like. Everyone else sort of copied Ditko's versions of those extra dimensions, which were great and wonderful. When Gene came on, he didn't feel a real rapport with that, I guess, so his extra dimensions tended to be just blackness and smoke and things of that sort... Sometimes it was a little strange for a dimension Doc Strange had been to before to look different when drawn by Gene, but nobody complained." Thomas recalled in 2000 that he returned to work a day late from a weekend comic book convention to find that Marvel production manager Sol Brodsky had assigned Doctor Strange to writer Archie Goodwin, newly ensconced at Marvel and writing Iron Man. Thomas convinced Brodsky to allow him to continue writing the title. "I got very possessive about Doctor Strange," Thomas recalled. "It wasn't a huge seller, but [by the time it was canceled] we were selling the low 40 percent range of more than 400,000 print run, so it was actually selling a couple hundred thousand copies [but] at the time you needed to sell even more."

=== Doctor Strange: Master of the Mystic Arts (Doctor Strange vol. 2) ===
Doctor Strange's feature in the Marvel Premiere series segued to the character's second ongoing title, Doctor Strange: Master of the Mystic Arts, also known as Doctor Strange vol. 2, which ran 81 issues (June 1974 – February 1987). Doctor Strange #14 featured a crossover story with The Tomb of Dracula #44, another series that was being drawn by Gene Colan at the time. In Englehart's final story, he sent Dr. Strange back in time to meet Benjamin Franklin. In 2010, Comics Bulletin ranked Englehart's work on Doctor Strange with artists Frank Brunner and Colan ninth on its list of the "Top 10 1970s Marvels."

The series ended with a cliffhanger as his home, the Sanctum Sanctorum, was heavily damaged during a battle. The title was discontinued so that the character's adventures could be transferred to another split-book-format series, Strange Tales vol. 2 #1–19 (April 1987 – October 1988), which was shared with Cloak and Dagger.

=== Doctor Strange: Sorcerer Supreme ===
Strange was returned to his own series, this time titled Doctor Strange: Sorcerer Supreme, which ran 90 issues (November 1988 – June 1996). The initial creative team was writer Peter B. Gillis and artists Richard Case and Randy Emberlin, with storylines often spanning multiple issues. During this time the series became part of the "Midnight Sons" group of Marvel's supernatural comics.

Jackson Guice's cover for Doctor Strange #15 (1990) used Christian music singer Amy Grant's likeness without her permission, leading to a complaint saying that the cover gave the appearance that she was associating with witchcraft. A US District Court sealed an out-of-court settlement between Grant and Marvel in early 1991 with a consent decree in which Marvel did not admit to liability or wrongdoing.

=== Doctor Strange vol. 3 ===
As part of the Marvel Knights imprint, the third volume of Doctor Strange was released in 1999. Given the subtitle Flight of Bones, the volume was written by Dan Jolley and Tony Harris, and briefly ran for four issues.

=== Doctor Strange vol. 4 ===
In 2015, Jason Aaron and Chris Bachalo teamed up for the fourth volume of Doctor Strange. Writers Dennis Hopeless and Penciler Niko Henrichon took charge during the Secret Empire event in issues 21-24, with Bachalo still providing covers. Writer John Barber and Penciler Niko Henrichon took charge for issues 25-26. After the Marvel Legacy renumbering, writer Donny Cates and pencilers Frazer Irving and Chip Zdarsky took over at issues #381-390. Considering the legacy renumbering, the fourth volume actually has a total of 36 issues.

=== Doctor Strange vol. 5 ===
A fifth Doctor Strange series was launched by writer Mark Waid and artist Jesus Saiz in August 2018. The series was concluded at a total of 20 issues.

=== Dr. Strange, Surgeon Supreme ===
A short-lived sixth series, Doctor Strange: Surgeon Supreme, launched in December 2019 by writer Mark Waid and artist Kev Walker follows immediately after the storyline completed in the fifth series. The series was cancelled after six issues.

=== Death of Doctor Strange ===
Being a mini-series, Death of Doctor Strange was written by Jed MacKay, and penciled/inked by Lee Garbett. With focus on the temporary death of the heroic sorcerer and the reactions of fellow heroes, the 5-issue series lasted from November 2021 to March 2022.

=== Doctor Strange vol. 6 ===
This series (debuting with Doctor Strange #1, May 2023), headed by writer Jed MacKay and artist Pasqual Ferry, features the continued trials and tribulations of the recently revivified Stephen Strange as well as Clea's position in the series. The series connects to the Blood Hunt event and concludes after 18 issues.

=== Doctor Strange of Asgard ===
Being written by Derek Landy, the series takes places shortly after the Blood Hunt event. The story arc focuses on the aftermath of Strange losing the title of Earth's Sorcerer Supreme to Doctor Doom but finding a new purpose in the mythical realm of Asgard. The series consists of 5 issues and leads into Volume 7 of the title.

== Primary Series ==
Doctor Strange is featured or co-featured in the ongoing series:

- Strange Tales #110–111, #114–168 (July – Aug. 1963, Nov. 1963 – May 1968)
- Doctor Strange #169–183 (June 1968 – Nov. 1969)
- Marvel Premiere #3–14 (July 1972 – March 1974)
- Doctor Strange vol. 2 #1–81 [#184–264] (June 1974 – Feb. 1987)
- Strange Tales vol. 2 #1–19 (April 1987 – Oct. 1988)
- Doctor Strange: Sorcerer Supreme #1–90 [#265–354] (Nov. 1988 – June 1996)
- Doctor Strange vol. 3 #1–4 (Feb. – May 1999)
- Strange #1–6 (Nov. 2004 – July 2005): a six-part American comic book limited series published by Marvel Comics under their Marvel Knights imprint. Written by J. Michael Straczynski and Samm Barnes, with artwork by Brandon Peterson, Strange is a re-imagining of Doctor Strange's origin.
- Doctor Strange: The Oath #1–5 (Dec. 2006 – April 2007)
- Strange vol. 2 #1–4 (Jan. – April 2010)
- Doctor Strange vol. 4 #1–26 [#355–380] (Dec. 2015 – Dec. 2017)
- Doctor Strange and the Sorcerers Supreme #1–12 (Dec. 2016 – Nov. 2017)
- Doctor Strange #381–390 (Jan. – July 2018)
- Doctor Strange: Damnation #1–4 (April – June 2018)
- Doctor Strange vol. 5 #1–20 [#391–410] (Aug. 2018 – Dec. 2019)
- Dr. Strange #1–6 [#411–416] (Feb. – Oct. 2020)
- Death of Doctor Strange #1–5 (Nov. 2021 – March 2022)
- Strange vol. 3 #1–10 [#417–426] (May 2022 – March 2023)
- Doctor Strange: Fall Sunrise #1–4 (Jan. – April 2023)
- Doctor Strange vol. 6 #1–18 [#427–444] (May 2023 – Oct. 2024)
- Doctor Strange of Asgard #1–5 [#445–449] (May 2025 – Sept. 2025)

== Contributors ==
=== Vol. 1 (1968–1969; 2017–2018) ===
==== Writers ====
Years	Writer	Issues
1968-1969	Roy Thomas	#169-178, #180-183
1969	Reprint of Amazing Spider-Man Annual #2	#179
2017-2018	Donny Cates	#381-390

==== Pencilers ====
Years	Penciler	Issues
1968	Dan Adkins	#169-170
1968	Tom Palmer	#171
1968-1969	Gene Colan	#172-178, #180-183
1969	Reprint of Amazing Spider-Man Annual #2	#179
2017-2018	Gabriel Hernandez Walta	#381-385
2018	Niko Henrichon	#386-389
2018	Frazer Irving	#390
2018	Chip Zdarsky	#390

=== Vol. 2 (1974–1987) ===
==== Writers ====
Years	Writer	Issues
1974-1976	Steve Englehart	#1-18
1976-1977	Marv Wolfman	#19-20, #22-23, Annual #1
1976	P. Craig Russell	Annual #1
1977	Reprint of Doctor Strange (vol. 1) #169	#21
1977	Jim Starlin	#24-26
1978-1979, 1981-1986	Roger Stern	#27-30, #32-33, #35-37, #47-62, #65-73, #75
1978	Don McGregor	#31
1979	Ralph Macchio	#33-37
1979-1981	Chris Claremont	#38-45
1981	Bill Kunkel	#46
1981	David Michelinie	#46
1982	J.M. DeMatteis	#54
1984	Carl Potts	#63
1984	Ann Nocenti	#64
1985-1987	Peter B. Gillis	#74, #76-81

==== Pencilers ====
Years	Penciler	Issues
1974	Frank Brunner	#1-5
1975-1976, 1979-1981	Gene Colan	#6-18, #36-45, #47
1976	Alfredo Alcala	#19
1976-1977	Rudy Nebres	#20, #22
1976	P. Craig Russell	Annual #1
1977	Reprint of Doctor Strange (vol. 1) #169	#21
1977	Jim Starlin	#23, #26
1977	Al Milgrom	#24-25
1978-1979	Tom Sutton	#27-30, #33-35
1978	Ricardo Villamonte	#31
1978	Alan Kupperberg	#32
1981	Kerry Gammill	#46
1981-1982	Marshall Rogers	#48-53
1982, 1984-1985	Paul Smith	#54, #56, #65-66, #68-69, #71–73
1982	Brent Anderson	#54
1982	Michael Golden	#55
1983	Kevin Nowlan	#57
1983	Dan Green	#58-61
1983-1984	Steve Leialoha	#62, #67
1984	Carl Potts	#63
1984	Tony Salmons	#64
1985	Bret Blevins	#70
1985-1986	Mark Badger	#74, #76
1986	Sal Buscema	#75
1986-1987	Chris Warner	#76-81

=== Sorcerer Supreme (1988–1996) ===
==== Writers ====
Years	Writer	Issues
1988-1989	Peter B. Gillis	#1–4
1989-1993	Roy Thomas	#5-24, #26-47, #52-56, Annual #2
1989-1992	Dann Thomas	#5-24, #26-40
1991	Fabian Nicieza	#25
1992-1993	Len Kaminski	#48-50, #52
1993	Geof Isherwood	#51-53, #57-59, Annual #3
1993-1995	David Quinn	#60-67, #69-79, Annual #4
1994	Dan Abnett	#68
1995	Evan Skolnick	#77-79, #82
1995	Warren Ellis	#80-82
1995	Todd Dezago	#81, #83
1995-1996	J. M. DeMatteis	#84-90

==== Pencilers ====
Years	Penciler	Issues
1988-1989	Richard Case	#1–4
1989-1990	Jackson Guice	#5-16, #18, #20-24
1990	Jim Valentino	#17
1990	Gene Colan	#19
1991	Ron Lim	#25
1991	Chris Marrinan	#26-30, #32-33
1991	Tony DeZuniga	#31
1991	Dan Lawlis	#34-36
1992	M.C. Wyman	Annual #2
1992-1993	Geof Isherwood	#37-53, #55-57, Annual #3
1993	Frank Lopez	#54
1993-1994	Melvin Rubi	#60-62, #64-65, #68
1994	Max Douglas	#63
1994	John Hixson	#66
1994	Mark Tenney	#67
1994	David Brewer	#69
1994	Kyle Hotz	Annual #4
1994-1995	Peter Gross	#70-73, #76
1995	Steve Yeowell	#74
1995-1996	Mark Buckingham	#75, #80-82, #84, #86-90
1995	Richard Pace	#77
1995	Marie Severin	#78-79
1995	Gary Frank	#82
1995	Patrick Zircher	#83
1996	Pasqual Ferry	#85

=== Vol. 3 (1998–1999) ===
==== Writers ====
Years	Writer	Issues
1998-1999	Dan Jolley	#1-4
1998-1999	Tony Harris	#1-4
1998-1999	Ray Snyder	#1-4

==== Pencilers ====
Years	Penciler	Issues
1998-1999	Tony Harris	#1-2
1999	Paul Chadwick	#3-4

=== Vol. 4 (2015–2017) ===
==== Writers ====
Years	Writer	Issues
2015-2017	Jason Aaron	#1-20
2016	Kathryn Immonen	Annual #1
2016	Robbie Thompson	Annual #1
2017	Dennis Hopeless	#21-24
2017	John Barber	#25-26

==== Pencilers ====
Years	Penciler	Issues
2015-2017	Chris Bachalo	#1-10, 12-16, 18-20
2015-2017	Kevin Nowlan	#1, 6, 11, 20, 25
2016	Leonardo Romero	Annual #1, #11
2016	Jonathan Marks	Annual #1
2016	Mike Deodato	#6
2016-2017	Jorge Fornes	#6, 15
2016	Kev Walker	#6
2017	Cory Walker	#16
2017	Frazer Irving	#17
2017	Niko Henrichon	#21-24
2017	Juan Frigeri	#25

=== Vol. 5 (2018–2019) ===
==== Writers ====
Years	Writer	Issues
2018-2019	Mark Waid	#1-20
2019	Barry Kitson	#17
2019	Tini Howard	Annual #1

==== Pencilers ====
Years	Penciler	Issues
2018-2019	Jesús Saíz	#1-5, 9-11, 18-19
2018-2019	Javier Pina	#6-8, 11, 20
2019	Barry Kitson	#12-17
2019	Andy MacDonald	Annual #1

=== Vol. 6 (2023–2024) ===
==== Writer ====
Years	Writers	Issues
2023-2024	Jed MacKay	#1-18
2023	Amy Chu	#3

==== Pencilers ====
Years	Penciler	Issues
2023-2024	Pasqual Ferry	#1-3, 5, 7-10, 13-18
2023	Andy MacDonald	#1, 4
2023	Tokitokoro	#3
2023	Juan Gedeon	#6
2024	Danilo Beyruth	#11-12

== Collected editions ==
Title	Material collected	Pages	Publication Date	ISBN
Essential Marvel
Essential Doctor Strange Volume 1	Strange Tales #110, 111, 114–168	608	May 2006	978-0785123163
Essential Doctor Strange Volume 2	Doctor Strange #169–178, #180–183; The Avengers #61; Sub-Mariner #22; The Incredible Hulk vol. 2, #126; Marvel Feature #1; Marvel Premiere #3–10, #12–14	608	March 2005	0785116680
Essential Doctor Strange Volume 3	Doctor Strange Vol. 2, #1–29, Doctor Strange Annual #1; and The Tomb of Dracula #44–45	616	December 2007	9780785127338
Essential Doctor Strange Volume 4	Doctor Strange Vol. 2, #30–56; Chamber of Chills #4; Man-Thing #4	564	June 2009	9780785130628
Marvel Masterworks
Marvel Masterworks: Doctor Strange Volume 1	Strange Tales #110–111, 114–141	270	June 2003	9780785145646
Marvel Masterworks: Doctor Strange Volume 2	Strange Tales #142–168	304	January 2005	9780785117377
Marvel Masterworks: Doctor Strange Volume 3	Doctor Strange #169–179 and The Avengers #61	256	March 2007	9780785124108
Marvel Masterworks: Doctor Strange Volume 4	Doctor Strange #180–183; Sub-Mariner #22; The Incredible Hulk vol. 2, #126; Marvel Feature #1; Marvel Premiere #3–8	272	January 2010	9780785134954
Marvel Masterworks: Doctor Strange Volume 5	Marvel Premiere #9–14; Doctor Strange Vol. 2 #1–9	272	April 2011	9780785150220
Marvel Masterworks: Doctor Strange Volume 6	Doctor Strange Vol. 2 #10–22; Annual #1; The Tomb of Dracula #44	288	July 2013	9780785167860
Marvel Masterworks: Doctor Strange Volume 7	Doctor Strange Vol. 2 #23–37 and material from Chamber of Chills #3–4	304	November 2016	9781302900229
Marvel Masterworks: Doctor Strange Volume 8	Doctor Strange Vol. 2 #38–46, Man-Thing #4, Marvel Fanfare #5, What If? #18, and material from the Marvel Comics Calendar 1980	296	May 2017	9781302907129
Marvel Masterworks: Doctor Strange Volume 9	Doctor Strange vol. 2 #47–57, Marvel Fanfare #6; and material from Crazy #88, and the Official Handbook of the Marvel Universe vol. 1 #3	336	October 2019	9781302917043
Marvel Masterworks: Doctor Strange Volume 10	Doctor Strange vol. 2 #58–73	400	February 2022	9781302933203
Marvel Masterworks: Doctor Strange Volume 11	Doctor Strange vol. 2 #74–81, Marvel Graphic Novel #23; material from Strange Tales #1-3, Marvel Fanfare #8, #31	344	January 2025	9781302955625
Epic Collections
Doctor Strange, Vol 1: Master of the Mystic Arts	Strange Tales #110–111, 114–146; Amazing Spider-Man Annual #2	400	October 2018	978-1302911386
Doctor Strange, Vol. 2: I, Dormammu	Strange Tales #147-168; Doctor Strange #169-179; Avengers #61; Not Brand Echh #13	504	January 2024	9781302953157
Doctor Strange, Vol. 3: A Separate Reality	Doctor Strange #180–183; Sub-Mariner #22; Incredible Hulk #126; Marvel Premiere #3–10, #12–14; Doctor Strange (vol. 2) #1–2, #4–5; material from Marvel Feature #1; Marvel Premiere #11; Doctor Strange (vol. 2) #3	472	November 2016	9780785194446
Doctor Strange, Vol. 4: Alone Against Eternity	Doctor Strange (vol. 2) #6–28, Doctor Strange Annual #1, Tomb of Dracula #44	488	October 2020	9781302921996
Doctor Strange, Vol. 5: The Reality War	Doctor Strange (vol. 2) #29-51, Man-Thing #4; material from Chamber of Chills #3-4, Defenders #53	504	February 2022	9781302933579
Doctor Strange, Vol. 8: Triumph and Torment	Doctor Strange, Sorcerer Supreme #1–13, Marvel Graphic Novel: Doctor Strange and Doctor Doom - Triumph and Torment	488	November 2019	9781302920562
Doctor Strange, Vol. 9: Vampiric Verses	Doctor Strange, Sorcerer Supreme #14–33, Ghost Rider #12	504	September 2021	9781302930745
Doctor Strange, Vol. 10: Infinity War	Doctor Strange, Sorcerer Supreme #34–47, Annual #2; Silver Surfer #67; Spider-Man/Doctor Strange: The Way to Dusty Death GN	480	August 2022	9781302945374
Doctor Strange, Vol. 11: Nightmare on Bleecker Street	Doctor Strange, Sorcerer Supreme #48-61, Annual #3; Morbius, the Living Vampire #9, Marvel Comics Presents #146, Marvel Super-Heroes #12, #14	488	January 2023	9781302951054
Doctor Strange, Vol. 13: Afterlife	Strange Tales vol 3. #1, Doctor Strange, Sorcerer Supreme #76–90 & Ashcan Edition, Doctor Strange: What Is It That Disturbs You, Stephen? GN	496	October 2017	9781302907891
Volume 1
Doctor Strange Omnibus vol. 1	Strange Tales #110–111, 114–146; Amazing Spider-Man Annual #2	456	September 2016	9780785199243
Doctor Strange Omnibus vol. 2	Strange Tales #147–168, Doctor Strange #169–183, Avengers #61, Sub-Mariner #22, Incredible Hulk #126; Marvel Feature #1, Not Brand Echh #13	704	January 2022	9781302926632
Volume 2
Doctor Strange: A Separate Reality	Marvel Premiere #9–10, 12–14; Doctor Strange vol. 2, #1–2, 4–5	176	2002	9780785108368
Dr. Strange Vs. Dracula: The Montesi Formula	Doctor Strange vol. 2 #14, 58–62; The Tomb of Dracula #44	160	October 2006	9780785122449
Dr. Strange: Into the Dark Dimension	Doctor Strange vol. 2 #68–74	168	July 2011	9780785155058
Dr. Strange: Don't Pay the Ferryman	Doctor Strange vol. 2 #75–81	167	October 2015	9780785193258
Strange Tales
Doctor Strange: Strange Tales	Dr. Strange stories from Strange Tales #1–19 and Cloak & Dagger story from Strange Tales #7	240	October 2011	9780785155492
Sorceror Supreme
Doctor Strange, Sorcerer Supreme Omnibus vol. 1	Doctor Strange, Sorcerer Supreme #1–40 and Ghost Rider vol. 3 #12	1,064	July 2016	9781302907075
Doctor Strange, Sorcerer Supreme Omnibus vol. 2	Doctor Strange: Sorcerer Supreme #41–59, Annual #2–3, Spider-Man/Dr. Strange: The Way to Dusty Death, Silver Surfer vol. 3 #67, Morbius: The Living Vampire #9, Secret Defenders #1–11, and material from Incredible Hulk Annual #18, Namor the Sub-Mariner Annual #2, and Silver Surfer Annual #5	1,056	April 2018	9781302911782
Doctor Strange, Sorcerer Supreme Omnibus vol. 3	Doctor Strange: Sorcerer Supreme #60-90, Annual #4 and Ashcan Edition; Strange Tales (1994) #1; Midnight Suns Unlimited #6; Dr. Strange: What is it That Disturbs You, Stephen? GN; Untold Tales of Spider-Man: Strange Encounter GN	1,080	April 26, 2022	9781302930448
Volume 3
Doctor Strange: The Flight of Bones	Doctor Strange volume 3 #1–4, Mystic Hands of Doctor Strange #1, material from Marvel Shadows and Light #1, Shadows & Light #2, Marvel Double-Shot #4	192	November 2016	9781302901677
Strange
Doctor Strange: Beginnings and Endings	Strange vol. 1 #1–6	144	September 2005	9780785115779
Strange: The Doctor Is Out!	Strange vol. 2 #1–4	104	October 2011	9780785144250
Volume 4
Doctor Strange: The Way of the Weird	Doctor Strange vol. 4 #1–5	136	2016	978-0785199328
Doctor Strange: The Last Days of Magic	Doctor Strange vol. 4 #6–10 and Doctor Strange: Last Days of Magic #1	168	2017	978-0785199335
Doctor Strange: Blood in the Aether	Doctor Strange vol. 4 #11–16	136	2017	978-1302903008
Doctor Strange: Mr. Misery	Doctor Strange vol. 4 #17–20, Annual #1	136	2018	978-1302905873
Doctor Strange: Secret Empire	Doctor Strange vol. 4 #21–26	136	2018	978-1302905897
Doctor Strange vol. 1	Doctor Strange vol. 4 #1–10, Doctor Strange: Last Days of Magic #1	280	2017	978-1302904326
Doctor Strange vol. 2	Doctor Strange vol. 4 #11–20, Annual #1	272	2018	978-1302908973
Doctor Strange by Aaron & Bachalo Omnibus	Doctor Strange vol. 4 #1–20, Annual #1, Doctor Strange: Last Days of Magic #1	576	2022	978-1302933487
Volume 4 Legacy
Doctor Strange by Donny Cates Vol. 1: God of Magic	Doctor Strange #381–385	136	2018	978-1302910648
Doctor Strange by Donny Cates Vol. 2: City of Sin	Doctor Strange #386–390	112	2018	978-1302910655
Doctor Strange: Damnation - The Complete Collection	Damnation #1–4, Johnny Blaze: Ghost Rider #1, Doctor Strange #386–389, Iron Fist #78–80, Ben Reilly: Scarlet Spider #15–17	336	2018	978-1302912604
Doctor Strange by Donny Cates	Doctor Strange vol. 4 #381–390, Doctor Strange: Damnation #1–4	360	2019	978-1302915292
Doctor Strange by Donny Cates	Doctor Strange vol. 4 #381–390, Doctor Strange: Damnation #1–4	360	July 2023	978-1302950064
Doctor Strange and the Sorcerers Supreme
Doctor Strange and the Sorcerers Supreme Vol. 1: Out of Time	Doctor Strange and the Sorcerers Supreme #1–6	136	May 2017	978-1302905903
Doctor Strange and the Sorcerers Supreme Vol. 2: Time After Time	Doctor Strange and the Sorcerers Supreme #7–12	136	December 2017	978-1302905910
Volume 5
Doctor Strange by Mark Waid vol. 1: Across the Universe	Doctor Strange vol. 5 #1–5	112	December 2018	978-1302912338
Doctor Strange by Mark Waid vol. 2: Remittance	Doctor Strange vol. 5 #6–11	152	May 2019	978-1302912345
Doctor Strange by Mark Waid vol. 3: Herald	Doctor Strange vol. 5 #12–17	136	September 2019	978-1302914578
Doctor Strange by Mark Waid vol. 4: The Choice	Doctor Strange vol. 5 #18–20 and Doctor Strange Annual (2019) #1	112	January 2020	978-1302914585
Doctor Strange by Mark Waid vol 1	Doctor Strange vol. 5 #1–11	264	December 2023	978-1302952877
Doctor Strange by Mark Waid vol 2	Doctor Strange vol. 5 #12–20, Doctor Strange Annual (2019) #1, Dr. Strange (2019) 1-6	384	July 2024	978-1302952877
Dr. Strange, Surgeon Supreme
Dr. Strange, Surgeon Supreme	Dr. Strange #1–6	112	December 2020	978-1302921057
Strange
Strange Vol. 1: I Belong to Death	Strange #1–5	128	September 2022	978-1302946029
Strange Vol. 2: The Doctor Strange of Death	Strange #6–10	112	April 2023	978-1302946746
Volume 6
Doctor Strange by Jed MacKay Vol. 1: The Life of Doctor Strange	Doctor Strange vol. 6 #1–5	136	October 2023	978-1302951160
Doctor Strange by Jed MacKay Vol. 2: The War-Hound of the Vishanti	Doctor Strange vol. 6 #6–10	112	March 2024	978-1302951177
Doctor Strange by Jed MacKay Vol. 3: Blood Hunt	Doctor Strange vol. 6 #11–18	176	November 2024	978-1302954802
Collected Miniseries
Doctor Strange: The Oath	Doctor Strange: The Oath #1–5	128	June, 2013	9780785122111
Dr. Strange & Dr. Doom: Triumph and Torment	Doctor Strange and Doctor Doom: Triumph and Torment, Doctor Strange vol. 2 #57, and material from Astonishing Tales #8 and Marvel Fanfare #16 and #43	168	September 2013	9780785156154
Doctor Strange: Strange Origin	Doctor Strange: Season One and Doctor Strange vol. 4 #1	144	September 2016	9780785163916
Doctor Strange: What Is It That Disturbs You, Stephen?	Doctor Strange: What Is It That Disturbs You, Stephen?, Doctor Strange Annual #1, Marvel Premiere #7, and Doctor Strange (1974) #34; and material from Doctor Strange vol. 2 #46, Marvel Fanfare #5–6 and #8, Chamber of Chills #1–2, and Journey Into Mystery vol. 2 #4.	224	October 2016	9781302901684
Doctor Strange: Damnation	Doctor Strange: Damnation #1–4	136	July 2018	978-1302913922
Doctor Strange: Fall Sunrise	Doctor Strange: Fall Sunrise #1–4	136	August 2023	978-1302950767
Death of Doctor Strange
Death of Doctor Strange	Death of Doctor Strange #1-4	144	March 2022	978-1302930226
Death of Doctor Strange Companion	Death of Doctor Strange: Avengers (2021) #1, Strange Academy Presents: The Death of Doctor Strange (2021) #1, Death of Doctor Strange: Spider-Man (2021) #1, Death of Doctor Strange: White Fox (2021) #1, Death of Doctor Strange: Blade (2021) #1, Death of Doctor Strange: X-Men/Black Knight (2021) #1, Death of Doctor Strange: Bloodstone (2022) #1	200	March 2022	978-1302933104

== See also ==
- Strange (comic book)
- Strange Academy
