= Tribe (comics) =

1993 comic book

Cover of the first issue

Tribe is an American comic book published first in 1993. Created by Todd Johnson and Larry Stroman, Tribe launched as part of Image Comics' second round of titles. Tribe issue one with over one million copies sold stands as the best selling African American comic from African American creators of all time. Limited edition ivory copies of book one at the height of the series popularity sold for as much as $200.00.

Axis Comics later printed two more issues (2, 3) of the series before itself going under due to financial difficulties. The final issue (0) was published by Good Comics.

== Publication history ==
Tribe was a comic book about the adventures of a predominantly African-American and minority superhero group based in Brooklyn, New York. During its limited run, the plot of Tribe centered on their conflicts with a conglomerate of European and Japanese techno-pirates known as Europan, which had a mysterious connection to a power-crazed, armor-clad villain known as "Lord Deus". The final issue also featured an appearance by Erik Larsen's Savage Dragon, even positing an alternate origin for the character.

Due to constant changes behind the scenes, with Stroman and Johnson switching companies, Tribe's release schedule was inconsistent. In issue #1, Blindspot and Hannibal rescue young illusionist Alexander Collins from thugs hired by Europan, introducing him to their collective. In #2, Europan attacks both Collins (later to be known as "Front") and the lab of a Tribe-associated scientist who later becomes known as "Steel Pulse" after his liquid metal armor is released by gunfire from the Europan cyborgs and becomes bonded to his body. Tribe also faces the faux-"gangsta" superpowered assassin "Out Cold" at Front's club. Suddenly, the bizarre "Lord Deus" arrives on the scene, along with the Savage Dragon, who is on duty as a police officer.

In the final published issue of Tribe from the short-lived Good Comics (confusingly numbered "#0", but actually concluding the existing storyline from Image), Tribe and the Dragon fight Lord Deus, who drops portentous hints as to his true supernatural nature and sends the Dragon back in time (thus revealing his "origin"). Suddenly, team strongwoman "Rosalyn" transforms into a godlike armored being who proclaims she "remembers" her true past, implying that she is an immortal and an old enemy of Deus. Deus is defeated by Rosalyn and escapes, while the rest of Tribe is confused by her new appearance and powers.

Even after leaving Image Comics, Tribe continued to drop hints and in-jokes regarding its universe's characters, as well as including the cameo from the Savage Dragon. In issue #2, Tribe tries to avoid scrutiny from the police by claiming to be the "Urban Division" of Youngblood.

== Characters ==
Originally, Tribe's creators explained that Tribe was intended to grow to over 200 members; Tribe was supposed to be a massive underground movement with dozens of heroes.

Tribe is led by Blindspot, who wears a stealth suit allowing him to become silent and invisible. Blindspot was apparently a scientific genius whose work was exploited and "stolen from [him]" by Europan. Other members included Front, a nightclub DJ who can change individuals' perceptions and create totally interactive and immersive illusions; Shift, a former champion prize fighter who has super-speed and hyper-reflexes; Short Order, who can divide himself into multiple smaller versions of himself; Hannibal, a massive robot that gets destroyed and rebuilt over and over again; Steel Pulse, a liquid metal being that employs an exoskeleton to keep its shape; and Rosalyn, a voluptuous powerhouse whose abilities were not specifically defined.

Stroman and Johnson stated that Tribe would have a rotating focus on its multitude of members not seen in the early (and only) issues. Trading card sets put out for the series showed a number of these potential future characters, including "Fly Girl", a New York runway model and fashion designer with flying abilities. "Fly Girl" supposedly produced a line of clothing for Tribe's headquarters, the "Beat Down Gym", and in a touch of real-life commercial synergy, Stroman and Johnson advertised similar Tribe fashions for sale in advertisements within the comic book. Many of the items (The Beat Down Gym - Hype Club and others) were sold by the creators at comic conventions and online.

Tribe has been optioned as a live action film and animated series with Mario van Peebles as director. Tribe remains one of the most talked about comics of the 1990s and there is always internet chatter and creator hints of its possible return.
