= Mike Okamoto =

American comic book artist and commercial illustrator

Atomic Age #1 (Nov. 1990): Cover art by Okamoto and Kevin Nowlan.

Mike Okamoto (born Detroit, Michigan, United States) is an American comic book artist and commercial illustrator best known for co-creating Marvel Comics' Atomic Age; as a "good girl art" cartoonist; and as the five-time International Network of Golf Illustrator of the Year.

== Biography ==
=== Early life and career ===
Born around 1953 and raised in Detroit, Michigan, where he graduated from Cass Technical High School, Mike Okamoto attended the Parsons School of Design, in New York City, on a full scholarship from 1971–1975. He was influenced by the work of such fine artists and comics artists as N.C. Wyeth, Carl Barks, Mort Drucker, Frank Frazetta, and Al Williamson. In the 1980s he did illustrations for magazines including PC Mag, and Video Review. In 1990, Okamoto met writer-editor Diana Light. He moved to West Virginia, where they wed the following year.

=== Comic books ===
By then he had broken into comic books, illustrating writer Mike Barr's The Maze Agency #15 (Aug. 1990) and Hero Alliance #11–12 (Nov.-Dec. 1990) for Innovation Comics, where he later did painted covers for the licensed series Lost in Space and the painted series Piers Anthony's Incarnations of Immortality: On a Pale Horse. For Marvel's Epic Comics imprint in 1990, he and writer Frank Lovece created the four-issue miniseries Atomic Age, a 1950s-style science fiction story reimagined from a contemporary perspective. The journal Nuclear Texts & Contexts said of the "series dealing with alien invaders set during the Sputnik era" that "[a]lthough no nuclear war is featured, there is plenty of wry satire on Cold War paranoia, and on racism". Inker Al Williamson, one of Okamoto's role models, won the 1991 Eisner Award for Best Inker for his work here and elsewhere the preceding year.

His other comics art includes the story "Nursery Crime" in Epic's Clive Barker's Hellraiser: Dark Holiday Special; and the painted covers and stories for the Chaos Comics miniseries Suspira: The Great Working #1 and #4 (April & Aug. 1997). Of that last, a critic at the New Age magazine The Monthly Aspectarian, wrote, "[T]his mini-series is worth a look-see for two reasons: the engaging story, and lavish airbrushed painted art which is gorgeous. Artist Mike Okamoto visualizes demons that are truly creepy". Okamoto is among the artists whose work appears in poet Hart D. Fisher's 1998 book Still Dead.

=== Later career ===
The actress June Lockhart commissioned Okamoto for the painted portrait of her as Lost in Space character Maureen Robinson, which she sells as autographed posters.

With his wife, Diana Light, Okamoto co-created the science fiction/fantasy project Zone21, which they show as a work-in-progress at comic book conventions.

== Awards ==
For his painted work on Issue #1 of Innovation's adaptation of the Piers Anthony novel On a Pale Horse in 1991, Okamoto won the Russ Manning Most Promising Newcomer Award, given annually at San Diego Comic-Con.

From 1999 to 2004, and then again in 2006, Okamoto won the International Network of Golf Illustrator of the Year Award, for his work in Golf Illustrated magazine. He additionally won for Outstanding Achievement in Illustration in 2004.
