= Alan Zelenetz =

American film producer

- Born: June 24, 1948 (age 78)
- Area: Writer
- Notable works: Alien Legion, Conan the King, Thor

Alan Zelenetz (born June 24, 1948) is an American film producer and comic-book writer best known for co-creating the series Alien Legion for the Marvel Comics imprint Epic Comics and a founder of Ovie Entertainment. Zelenetz also wrote several issues of Marvel's Moon Knight, Thor, and Conan the King.

== Biography ==
Before becoming a film producer, Zelenetz was a junior high school principal at the Yeshiva of Flatbush, an Orthodox Jewish school in Brooklyn, and Solomon Schechter High School of New York. One of the science teachers under his supervision was the father of Darren Aronofsky, director of Pi (1998) and Requiem for a Dream (2000).

Zelenetz quit his job as a high school principal and worked his way into a paid position at Marvel Comics. He did some volunteer proofreading work for a while, and then started to write for Thor, Conan the Barbarian, and Moon Knight. For Moon Knight, he introduced the Jewish identity of the character to the storyline. In Thor Annual #10 (1982), Zelenetz introduced the first Nigerian hero, Shango (recruited by Thor to confront Demogorge), in the history of Marvel.

Zelenetz was the main author and researcher for Marvel's Official Handbook of the Conan Universe, a guide to the Hyborian Age, the fictional setting of the Conan the Barbarian stories. He and artist John Buscema collaborated on the Kull the Conqueror series in 1982–1983. Zelenetz wrote the first Alien Legion series for Epic Comics. The characters had conceived by creator Carl Potts as "the French Foreign Legion in space." Zelenetz and Charles Vess crafted "The Warriors Three Saga" in Marvel Fanfare #34–37 (Sept. 1987–April 1988).

He is also director of ICI, the Institute for Curricular Initiatives in New York City.

== Selected filmography ==
- Pi (1998) (Judaica advisor)
- Darkon (2006) (producer, executive producer;)
- The Funeral Party (2007) (co-producer)
- Andorra scheduled in (2007) (producer)

== Comics bibliography ==
=== Marvel Comics ===
- Alien Legion #1–20 (1984–1987)
- Alien Legion vol. 2 #1 (1987)
- Amazing High Adventure #4 (1986)
- The Avengers #224 (1982)
- Bizarre Adventures #32 (Thor) (1982)
- Conan the Barbarian #145 (1983)
- Conan the King #20–27 (1984–1985)
- Epic Illustrated #30 (1985)
- Jhereg: The Graphic Novel #1 (1990)
- King Conan #16–19 (1983)
- Kree–Skrull War Starring the Avengers #1 (prologue) (1983)
- Kull the Conqueror #1 (1982)
- Kull the Conqueror #2–10 (1983–1985)
- Marvel Age Annual #1 (1985)
- Marvel Fanfare #13, #34–37 (1984–1988)
- Marvel Graphic Novel #15 ("The Raven Banner (A Tale of Asgard)"), #25 ("Alien Legion: A Grey Day to Die"), #47 ("Kull: The Vale of Shadow") (1985–1989)
- Master of Kung Fu #123–125 (1983)
- Moon Knight #18 (text article), #21–22, #27, #32 (backup stories); #36–38 (main stories) (1982–1984)
- Moon Knight vol. 2 #1–4 (1985)
- Official Handbook of the Conan Universe #1 (1986)
- Savage Sword of Conan #83, #86, #88, #95 (1982–1983)
- Thor #329–336 (1983)
- Thor Annual #10–13 (1982–1985)
- What If? #35 (Yellowjacket), #39 (Thor and Conan), #41 (Namor) (1982–1983)

Preceded by Doug Moench	Thor writer 1983 (with Bob Hall in early 1983)	Succeeded by Walt Simonson
Preceded by Doug Moench	Master of Kung Fu writer 1983	Succeeded by n/a
Preceded by n/a	Alien Legion writer 1984–1987	Succeeded by Chuck Dixon
Preceded by Chris Claremont	Marvel Fanfare writer 1987–1988	Succeeded by Jo Duffy
