= Alien Legion =

Science fiction comic book series

Publication information
- Publisher: Epic Comics
- Format: Limited series
- Genre: Military science fiction
- Publication date: April 1984 – August 1990
- No. of issues: 38

Creative team
- Created by: Carl Potts; Alan Zelenetz; Frank Cirocco

Collected editions
- Alien Legion: Slaughterworld: ISBN 0-87135-763-1
- Omnibus Volume 1: ISBN 1595823948

Alien Legion is a thirty-eight-issue American science fiction comic book series, with several associated titles, created by Carl Potts, Alan Zelenetz, and Frank Cirocco for Marvel Comics' Epic Comics imprint in 1983. It features a military unit, Force Nomad, similar to the French Foreign Legion.

Within the Marvel Comics Multiverse, the Alien Legion Universe is designated as Earth-98140.

== Development ==
Alien Legion — cover-titled The Alien Legion for its first series and initial graphic novel — features Force Nomad, a military unit similar to the French Foreign Legion. Its characters include leader Sarigar, whose lower half is serpentine, the fully humanoid Torie Montroc, and Jugger Grimrod, an alien of the Thraxian race.

Carl Potts began developing the character designs and structure of Alien Legion as a sample of his artwork when he was attempting to break into the comics field. He chose to develop an original story and characters to stand out from the competition when submitting to editors.

The original concept was the 'Foreign Legion in space' and all the legionnaires were human. ... Then I created the humanoid/serpentine design that later became Sarigar and decided that the Legion should include a wide variety of species. This was in the early '70s. By the time I got around to developing the idea further in the early '80s, Star Wars obviously became an influence. The Alien Legion universe is a giant extrapolation of the American democratic melting-pot society where different races and cultures work together for the common good while dealing with the pluses and problems that the nation's diversity creates.

Potts returned to the concept in 1983 after joining Marvel Comics, and the series was pitched as a part of the Marvel Universe. Jim Shooter, then Editor-in-Chief of Marvel, approved the idea and Potts began development on the series under Marvel's contract which guaranteed profit participation for new characters. After Shooter withdrew his permission for the series, Archie Goodwin extended an offer to launch Alien Legion under the Epic Comics imprint.

== Publication history ==
Potts and co-creators Alan Zelenetz (writer) and Frank Cirocco (penciler) completed development of series, and the franchise debuted with Marvel/Epic Comics' The Alien Legion #1-20 (cover-dated April 1984 - June 1987). The 18-issue Alien Legion (Oct. 1987 - Aug. 1990), minus "The", followed, generally scripted by Chuck Dixon and penciled by Larry Stroman. Afterward came the three-issue Dixon-Stroman miniseries Alien Legion: On The Edge (Nov. 1990 - Jan. 1991); the two-issue Dixon-Stroman Alien Legion: Tenants of Hell (1991); the one-shot cover-titled Alien Legion: Grimrod and copyrighted Alien Legion: Jugger Grimrod (Aug. 1992), by Dixon and artist Mike McMahon; the single-issue Alien Legion: Binary Deep (Sept. 1993), by Dixon and Argentine artist Enrique Alcatena; and the three-issue miniseries Alien Legion: One Planet at a Time (April–July 1993), by Dixon and penciler Hoang Nguyen.

Additionally, Marvel/Epic published two spin-offs: Marvel Graphic Novel #25 (cover-titled Marvel Graphic Novel: The Alien Legion), released in 1986 and containing the story "A Grey Day To Die" by writers Potts and Zelenetz, penciler Cirocco, and the first series' regular inker, Terry Austin; and the one-shot crossover with another series Law Dog and Grimrod: Terror at the Crossroads (1993).

As well, two short stories appeared: the 10-page "Tough Enough", by writer Dixon and penciler Doug Braithwaite, in the Marvel/Epic magazine Epic (cover-titled Epic: An Anthology) #3 (1992); and the 12-page "Altered State", by writer Potts and artist Alcatena, in Heavy Hitters Annual #1 (1993).

Dark Horse Comics originally announced a publication of a new Alien Legion series in 2010 but the series was delayed. Instead of being produced by Dark Horse, the new four-issue series, Uncivil War, was published in 2014 by Titan Comics. The new series was co-plotted by Potts and Dixon, scripted by Dixon, with art by Stroman and Potts.

The Alien Legion series of comics was the longest-running property to emerge from the Epic Comics line.

=== Collected editions ===
Some of the stories have been published in trade paperback and hardback form.

Alien Legion: Slaughterworld (1991; ISBN 0871357631), collects The Alien Legion #1 & 7-11.

Checker Book Publishing released the books Force Nomad and Piecemaker, collecting the second series, and Footsloggers, collecting the first six issues of the first volume. Titan Books published trade paperbacks of the On the Edge and Tenants of Hell miniseries.

Dark Horse Comics published the Alien Legion Omnibus Volume 1 in December 2009 (ISBN 1-59582-394-8), collecting the first seven story arcs of the original Epic Comics series; and Alien Legion Omnibus Volume 2 in May 2010 (ISBN 978-1-59582-494-3), rounding out the first series including the graphic novel.

Titan Comics began publishing omnibus collections of the original Epic Comics material in 2014. A collected hardcover edition of Uncivil War was published by Titan in February 2015.

PUBLICATION	ISSUE	WRITER	ARTIST	COLLECTED EDITION *=not collected
Alien Legion (1984 1st Series)	1–20	Carl Potts, Alan Zelenetz	Frank Cirocco, Terry Austin	Alien Legion: Footsloggers (Checker, collects #1–6) Alien Legion: Slaughterworld (Epic Comics, collects #1, 7–11) Alien Legion Omnibus Vol. 1 (Dark Horse, collects #1–11) Alien Legion Omnibus Vol. 2 (Dark Horse, collects #12–20)
Alien Legion: A Grey Day to Die (1986)	1	Carl Potts, Alan Zelenetz	Frank Cirocco, Terry Austin	Marvel Graphic Novel #25 (Marvel) Alien Legion Omnibus Vol. 2 (Dark Horse)
Alien Legion (1987 2nd Series)	1–18	Chuck Dixon, Alan Zelenetz	Larry Stroman, Randy Emberlin	Alien Legion: Force Nomad (Checker, collects #1–11) Alien Legion: Piecemaker (Checker, collects #12–18)
Alien Legion: On the Edge (1990)	1–3	Chuck Dixon	Larry Stroman, Mark Farmer	Alien Legion: On the Edge (Titan, collects #1–3 and Tough Enough one-shot)
Alien Legion: Tenants of Hell (1991)	1–2	Chuck Dixon	Larry Stroman, Dan Panosian	Alien Legion: Tenants of Hell (Titan)
Alien Legion: Jugger Grimrod (1992)	1	Chuck Dixon	Mike McMahon	Alien Legion: Tenants of Hell (Titan)
Alien Legion: Binary Deep (1993)	1	Chuck Dixon	Quique Alcatena	*
Alien Legion: One Planet at a Time (1993)	1–3	Chuck Dixon	Hoang Nguyen, Scott Hanna	*
Alien Legion: Dead and Buried (2014)	1	Chuck Dixon	Larry Stroman, Randy Emberlin	Alien Legion: Dead and Buried (Titan)
Alien Legion: Uncivil War (2014)	1–4	Chuck Dixon	Carl Potts, Larry Stroman	Alien Legion: Uncivil War (Titan)

== TV and film attempts ==
In 1995, Potts wrote a screenplay for an Alien Legion television adaptation, which was optioned in 1996 by MGM. Bob Gale (screenwriter of Back to the Future) wrote the pilot script. After MGM stopped development of the series, the property was then optioned by Dimension Films, but the series was cancelled due to management changes. Alien Legion was later developed by Mainframe Studios, who was seeking another science fiction property after ReBoot, and Potts was hired as executive editor to develop the animated version.

Through his friendship with producer Boaz Yakin, which began with their collaboration on early drafts of the first Punisher film, Potts' Alien Legion screenplay was optioned in 2009 by producer Jerry Bruckheimer and The Walt Disney Company. In 2010, Bruckheimer exercised the option, buying the screenplay and assigning Game of Thrones showrunner David Benioff to do a rewrite. Benioff, who was a fan of the comic series as a child, completed three drafts of the script before he was removed from the project. Potts introduced Tim Miller to the producers, who then declined the project due to creative differences with Disney. Potts stated that he was continuing to develop Alien Legion with other partners.

In 2023, the rights were picked up by Warner Bros., with Miller slated to direct an adaptation.
