= Epic Comics =

Imprint of Marvel Comics

- Type: Privately held company (subsidiary)
- Industry: Publishing
- Founded: 1982
- Founder: Jim Shooter
- Successor: Icon Comics
- Key people: Jim Shooter; Al Milgrom; Archie Goodwin
- Products: Comics
- Owner: Marvel Entertainment, LLC
- Parent: Marvel Comics

Epic Comics (also known as the Epic Comics Group) was an imprint of American publishing company Marvel Comics, active from 1982 to 1996. A spin-off of the publisher's Epic Illustrated magazine, it published creator-owned work unconnected to Marvel's superhero universe, and without the restrictions of the Comics Code. The name was revived by Marvel in the mid-2000s for a short-lived program inviting new writers to pitch series proposals to the publisher.

== History ==
=== Origins ===
Launched by editor-in-chief Jim Shooter as a spin-off of the successful Epic Illustrated magazine, the Epic imprint allowed creators to retain control and ownership of their properties. Co-edited by Al Milgrom and Archie Goodwin, the imprint also allowed Marvel to publish more objectionable content (sometimes explicit) without needing to comply with the stringent Comics Code Authority. Epic titles were printed on higher quality paper than typical Marvel comics, and were only available via the direct market. The first title to be published in this line was Dreadstar by Jim Starlin, which continued the Metamorphosis Odyssey storyline from Epic Illustrated.

== Titles ==
Dreadstar #1 (Nov. 1982), debut publication of Marvel Comics' Epic imprint. Cover art by Jim Starlin.

- Alien Legion by writers Carl Potts and Alan Zelenetz and artist Frank Cirocco
- Atomic Age by writer Frank Lovece, penciler Mike Okamoto and inker Al Williamson
- The Black Dragon by writer Chris Claremont and artist John Bolton
- The Bozz Chronicles by writer David Michelinie and artists Bret Blevins and John Ridgway, moved to Dover Publications in 2015
- Cadillacs and Dinosaurs (colorized version) by writer-artist Mark Schultz
- Captain Confederacy (second series) by writer Will Shetterly and artist Vince Stone
- Coyote by writer Steve Englehart and artist Marshall Rogers, moved to Image Comics in 2005
- Crash Ryan by writer-artist Ron Harris
- Dreadstar by writer-artist Jim Starlin
- Dreadlands by Andy Lanning, Steve White, and Phil Gascoine
- Clive Barker's Hellraiser by various writers and artists, moved to Boom! Studios in 2011
- Clive Barker's Nightbreed by writers Alan Grant and John Wagner and artist Jim Baikie
- Clive Barker's The Harrowers by writers McNally Sagal, Malcolm Smith, Anna Miller and Fred Vicarel and artist Gene Colan
- Elektra Lives Again by writer-artist Frank Miller and colorist Lynn Varley
- Elfquest by writer-artists Wendy and Richard Pini
- Feud by writer Mike Baron and artist Mark A. Nelson
- Fritz Leiber's Fafhrd and the Gray Mouser by writer Howard Chaykin and artist Mike Mignola, moved to Dark Horse Comics in 2007
- The Groo Chronicles by writer-artist Sergio Aragonés and writer Mark Evanier
- Havok & Wolverine: Meltdown by writers Walt and Louise Simonson and artists Kent Williams and Jon J. Muth
- Interface by writer James D. Hudnall and various artists
- Iron Man: Crash by writer-artist Mike Saenz
- Lawdog by writer Chuck Dixon and artists Flint Henry,
- The Light and Darkness War by writer Tom Veitch and artist Cam Kennedy, moved to Titan Books in 2015
- Marshal Law by writer Pat Mills and artist Kevin O'Neill, moved to DC Comics in 2013
- Metropol by writer-artist Ted McKeever
- Midnight Men by writer-artist Howard Chaykin
- Moonshadow by writer J. M. DeMatteis and artists Jon J. Muth, Kent Williams and George Pratt, moved to Dark Horse Comics in 2019
- The One by writer-artist Rick Veitch, moved to King Hell Press in 2003
- Pinhead by writers D. G. Chichester and Erik Saltzgaber and artists Dario Corrasco and Phil Gascoine
- Psychonauts by writers Alan Grant and Tony Luke and artist Motofumi Kobayashi
- Sachs and Violens by writer Peter David and writer-artist George Pérez, moved to DC Comics in 2006
- Shadowline by creator Archie Goodwin
- Sisterhood of Steel by writer Christie Marx and artist Mike Vosburg
- Six From Sirius by writer by Doug Moench and artist Paul Gulacy
- The Sleeze Brothers by writer John Carnell and artist Andy Lanning
- Spyke by writer Mike Baron and artist Bill Reinhold
- Stray Toasters by writer-artist Bill Sienkiewicz
- Steelgrip Starkey by writer-artist Alan Weiss
- Swords of the Swashbucklers by writer Bill Mantlo and artists Jackson Guice, Geof Isherwood and Colleen Doran
- Timespirits by writer Stephen Perry and artist Thomas Yeates
- Void Indigo by writer Steve Gerber and artist Val Mayerik
- Wild Cards by various writers and artists

== See also ==
- Icon Comics - imprint of Marvel Comics
- Max (comics) - imprint of Marvel Comics

== General and cited references ==
- Epic Comics at the Grand Comics Database
- Epic Comics at the Comic Book DB (archived from the original)
- "Epic Comics" at the International Catalogue of Superheroes
