= Russ Manning Most Promising Newcomer Award =

American award

The Russ Manning Most Promising Newcomer Award is an American award presented to a comic book artist whose first professional work appeared within the previous two years. It was named after comic book artist Russ Manning. The winner is chosen from a list of nominees picked by judges from the West Coast Comics Club and San Diego Comic-Con, and is given at the annual Eisner Award ceremony.

== Winners ==
- 1982 Dave Stevens
- 1983 Jan Duursema
- 1984 Steve Rude
- 1985 Scott McCloud
- 1986 Art Adams
- 1987 Eric Shanower
- 1988 Kevin Maguire
- 1989 Richard Piers Rayner
- 1990 Dan Brereton
- 1991 Dærick Gröss Sr.
- 1992 Mike Okamoto
- 1993 Jeff Smith
- 1994 Gene Ha
- 1995 Edvin Biuković
- 1996 Alexander Maleev
- 1997 Walt Holcomb
- 1998 Matt VanderPol
- 1999 Jay Anacleto
- 2000 Alan Bunce
- 2001 Goran Sudžuka
- 2002 Tan Eng Huat
- 2003 Jerome Opeña
- 2004 Eric Wight
- 2005 Chris Bailey
- 2006 R. Kikuo Johnson
- 2007 David Petersen
- 2008 Cathy Malkasian
- 2009 Eleanor Davis
- 2010 Marian Churchland
- 2011 Nate Simpson
- 2012 Tyler Crook
- 2013 Russel Roehling
- 2014 Aaron Conley
- 2015 (Tie)
  - Jorge Corona
  - Greg Smallwood
- 2016 Dan Mora
- 2017 Anne Szabla
- 2018 (Tie)
  - Hamish Steele
  - Pablo Tunica
- 2019 Lorena Alvarez
- 2022 Luana Vecchio
- 2023 Zoe Thorogood
- 2024 Oliver Bly
- 2025 Richard Blake

== See also ==
- Alley Award
- Bill Finger Award
- Eagle Award
- Eisner Award
- Harvey Award
- Inkpot Award
- Kirby Award
- National Comics Award
- Shazam Award
